= List of Xbox 360 games (M–Z) =

This is a list of Xbox 360 games (M-Z) that were released via retail disc, digital download or as part of the Xbox Live Arcade program. (Note: For a chronological list, click the sort button in any of the available region's columns. Games dated November 22, 2005 (North America), December 2, 2005 (Europe), December 10, 2005 (Japan), and March 23, 2006 (Australia) are launch titles for the specified regions.)

There are 2157 games on both parts of this list. (Note: This number is always up to date by this script.)

3D 3D support	K Kinect optional K required	DL Downloadable titles	XBLIG Xbox Live Indie Games	XBLA Xbox Live Arcade titles	XBO Xbox One forward compatible	XE Xbox One X enhanced

Title	Genre(s)	Developer(s)	Publisher(s)	Release date				Addons	Xbox One	Ref.
Title	Genre(s)	Developer(s)	Publisher(s)	NA	EU	JP	AU	Addons	Xbox One	Ref.
Machi-ing Maker 4	Puzzle game	D3Publisher	D3Publisher	Unreleased	Unreleased	Nov 23, 2011	Unreleased			
Mad Riders	Racing & flying	Techland	Ubisoft	May 30, 2012	Unreleased	Unreleased	Unreleased	XBLA		
Mad Tracks	Racing & flying	Load	Microsoft Game Studios	May 30, 2007	Unreleased	Unreleased	Unreleased	XBLA	XBO	
Madagascar 3: The Video Game	Action-adventure, platformer	Monkey Bar Games	D3 Publisher^{NA}, Namco Bandai Games^{EU/AU}	Jun 5, 2012	Oct 12, 2012	Unreleased	Dec 12, 2012			
Madagascar Kartz	Racing	Sidhe Interactive	Activision	Oct 23, 2009	Nov 6, 2009	Unreleased	Unreleased			
Madagascar: Escape 2 Africa	Action	Papaya Studio	Activision	Nov 4, 2008	Nov 28, 2008	Unreleased	Nov 26, 2008			
Madballs in Babo: Invasion	Shooter	Playbrains	Microsoft Game Studios	Jul 15, 2009	Unreleased	Unreleased	Unreleased	XBLA	XBO	
Madden NFL 06	Sports	EA Tiburon	EA Sports	Nov 22, 2005	Dec 2, 2005	Unreleased	Mar 23, 2006			
Madden NFL 07	Sports	EA Tiburon	EA Sports	Aug 22, 2006	Sep 8, 2006	Dec 21, 2006	Sep 6, 2006			
Madden NFL 08	Sports	EA Tiburon	EA Sports	Aug 14, 2007	Aug 31, 2007	Sep 20, 2007	Aug 23, 2007			
Madden NFL 09	Sports	EA Tiburon	EA Sports	Aug 12, 2008	Aug 15, 2008	Sep 25, 2008	Aug 14, 2008			
Madden NFL 10	Sports	EA Tiburon	EA Sports	Aug 14, 2009	Aug 14, 2009	Unreleased	Aug 13, 2009			
Madden NFL 11	Sports	EA Tiburon	EA Sports	Aug 10, 2010	Aug 13, 2010	Unreleased	Aug 12, 2010			
Madden NFL 12	Sports	EA Tiburon	EA Sports	Aug 30, 2011	Sep 2, 2011	Unreleased	Sep 1, 2011			
Madden NFL 13	Sports	EA Tiburon	EA Sports	Aug 28, 2012	Aug 31, 2012	Unreleased	Aug 30, 2012	K		
Madden NFL 15	Sports	EA Tiburon	EA Sports	Aug 26, 2014	Aug 31, 2014	Unreleased	Aug 30, 2014	K		
Madden NFL 16	Sports	EA Tiburon	EA Sports	Aug 25, 2015	Aug 25, 2015	Unreleased	Aug 25, 2015	K		
Madden NFL 17	Sports	EA Tiburon	EA Sports	Aug 23, 2016	Aug 23, 2016	Unreleased	Aug 23, 2016	K		
Madden NFL 25	Sports	EA Tiburon	EA Sports	Aug 27, 2013	Aug 30, 2013	Unreleased	Aug 29, 2013	K		
Madden NFL Arcade	Sports & recreation	EA Tiburon	Electronic Arts	Nov 25, 2009	Apr 10, 2010	Unreleased	Apr 10, 2010	XBLA		
Mafia II	Third-person shooter, action-adventure	2K Czech	2K Games	Aug 24, 2010	Aug 27, 2010	Unreleased	Aug 27, 2010		XBO	
Magic: The Gathering – Duels of the Planeswalkers	Card & board	Stainless Games	Wizards of the Coast	Jun 17, 2009	Unreleased	Unreleased	Unreleased	XBLA	XBO	
Magic: The Gathering 2012	Card & board	Stainless Games	Wizards of the Coast	Jun 15, 2011	Unreleased	Unreleased	Unreleased	XBLA	XBO	
Magic: The Gathering 2013	Card & board	Stainless Games	Wizards of the Coast	Jun 20, 2012	Unreleased	Unreleased	Unreleased	XBLA	XBO	
Magic: The Gathering 2014	Card & board	Stainless Games	Wizards of the Coast	Jun 26, 2013	Unreleased	Unreleased	Unreleased	XBLA	XBO	
Magic: The Gathering 2015	Card & board	Stainless Games	Wizards of the Coast	Jul 16, 2014	Unreleased	Unreleased	Unreleased	XBLA		
MagnaCarta 2	RPG	Softmax	Banpresto	Oct 13, 2009	Oct 16, 2009	Aug 6, 2009	Oct 28, 2009			
Magrunner: Dark Pulse	Action & adventure	Frogwares	Focus Home Interactive	Oct 25, 2013	Unreleased	Unreleased	Unreleased	XBLA		
Mahjong * Dream C Club	Puzzle game	D3Publisher	D3Publisher	Unreleased	Unreleased	Mar 29, 2012	Unreleased			
Maji-Ten: Maji de Tenshi o Tsukutte Mita	Visual novel	Idea Factory	Idea Factory	Unreleased	Unreleased	Sep 20, 2012	Unreleased			
Majin and the Forsaken Kingdom	Action-adventure, puzzle, platformer	Game Republic	Namco Bandai Games	Nov 23, 2010	Nov 26, 2010	Jan 20, 2011	Nov 25, 2010			
Major League Baseball 2K6	Sports	Visual Concepts	2K Sports	Apr 3, 2006	Apr 3, 2006	Apr 3, 2006	Nov 22, 2013			
Major League Baseball 2K7	Sports	Kush Games	2K Sports	Feb 27, 2007	Feb 27, 2007	Nov 8, 2007	Nov 22, 2013			
Major League Baseball 2K8	Sports	Kush Games	2K Sports	Mar 3, 2008	Mar 3, 2008	Nov 27, 2008	Nov 22, 2013			
Major League Baseball 2K9	Sports	Visual Concepts	2K Sports	Mar 3, 2009	Mar 3, 2009	Jul 9, 2009	Nov 22, 2013			
Major League Baseball 2K10	Sports	Visual Concepts	2K Sports	Mar 2, 2010	Mar 2, 2010	Unreleased	Unreleased			
Major League Baseball 2K11	Sports	Visual Concepts	2K Sports	Mar 8, 2011	Mar 8, 2011	Unreleased	Mar 18, 2011			
Major League Baseball 2K12	Sports	Visual Concepts	2K Sports	Mar 6, 2012	Mar 6, 2012	Unreleased	Nov 22, 2013			
Major League Baseball 2K13	Sports	Visual Concepts	2K Sports	Mar 5, 2013	Mar 5, 2013	Unreleased	Nov 22, 2013			
Mamoru-kun wa Norowarete Shimatta!	Scrolling shooter	G.rev	G.rev	Unreleased	Unreleased	Jun 25, 2009	Unreleased			
Man Vs. Wild With Bear Grylls	Adventure	Crave Games	Discovery Channel	Apr 12, 2011	Apr 12, 2011	Unreleased	Nov 22, 2013			
Marathon: Durandal	Action & adventure	Freeverse	Microsoft Game Studios	Aug 1, 2007	Unreleased	Unreleased	Unreleased	XBLA	XBO	
Marble Blast Ultra	Action & adventure	GarageGames	Microsoft Game Studios	Jan 25, 2006	Unreleased	Unreleased	Unreleased	XBLA		
Mark of the Ninja	Action & adventure	Klei Entertainment	Microsoft Studios	Sep 7, 2012	Unreleased	Unreleased	Unreleased	XBLA		
Marlow Briggs and the Mask of Death	Action & adventure	ZootFly	505 Games	Sep 20, 2013	Unreleased	Unreleased	Unreleased	XBLA	XBO	
Mars: War Logs	Role playing	Spiders	Focus Home Interactive	Jul 26, 2013	Unreleased	Unreleased	Unreleased	XBLA	XBO	
Marvel Avengers: Battle for Earth		Ubisoft Quebec	Ubisoft	Oct 30, 2012	Nov 9, 2012	Unreleased	Nov 8, 2012	K		
Marvel Puzzle Quest: Dark Reign	Puzzle & trivia	WayForward Technologies	D3 Go!	Oct 16, 2015	Unreleased	Unreleased	Unreleased	XBLA		
Marvel Super Hero Squad: Comic Combat	Fighting	Griptonite Games	THQ	Nov 15, 2011	Nov 18, 2011	Unreleased	Nov 22, 2013			
Marvel Super Hero Squad: The Infinity Gauntlet	Beat 'em up	Griptonite Games	THQ	Nov 16, 2010	Nov 16, 2010	Unreleased	Nov 22, 2013			
Marvel vs. Capcom 2: New Age of Heroes	Classics	Capcom/ Backbone Entertainment	Capcom	Jul 29, 2009	Unreleased	Unreleased	Unreleased	XBLA		
Marvel vs. Capcom 3: Fate of Two Worlds	Fighting	Capcom	Capcom	Feb 15, 2011	Feb 18, 2011	Feb 17, 2011	Nov 22, 2013			
Marvel vs. Capcom Origins	Fighting	Capcom/ Iron Galaxy	Capcom	Sep 26, 2012	Unreleased	Unreleased	Unreleased	XBLA		
Marvel: Ultimate Alliance	Action RPG	Raven Software	Activision	Oct 24, 2006	Nov 3, 2006	Unreleased	Nov 1, 2006			
Marvel: Ultimate Alliance 2	Action RPG	Raven Software	Activision	Sep 15, 2009	Sep 25, 2009	Unreleased	Nov 22, 2013			
Masquerade: The Baubles of Doom	Action & adventure	Big Ant Studios	Home Entertainment Suppliers	Apr 20, 2016	Unreleased	Unreleased	Unreleased	XBLA	XBO	
Mass Effect	Action RPG	BioWare	Microsoft Game Studios	Nov 20, 2007	Nov 23, 2007	May 21, 2009	Nov 22, 2013		XBO	
Mass Effect 2	Action RPG	BioWare	Electronic Arts	Jan 26, 2010	Jan 29, 2010	Unreleased	Nov 22, 2013		XBO	
Mass Effect 3	Action RPG	BioWare	Electronic Arts	Mar 6, 2012	Mar 9, 2012	Mar 15, 2012	Nov 22, 2013	K	XBO	
Matt Hazard: Blood Bath and Beyond	Action & adventure	Vicious Cycle Software	D3 Publisher	Jan 6, 2010	Unreleased	Unreleased	Unreleased	XBLA	XBO	
The Maw	Action & adventure	Twisted Pixel Games	Microsoft Game Studios	Jan 21, 2009	Unreleased	Unreleased	Unreleased	XBLA	XBO	
Max Payne 3	Third-person shooter	Rockstar Studios	Rockstar Games	May 15, 2012	May 18, 2012	May 18, 2012	Nov 22, 2013		XBO	
Max: The Curse of Brotherhood	Action & adventure	Press Play	Microsoft Studios	May 21, 2014	Unreleased	Unreleased	Unreleased	XBLA		
Mayhem 3D	Racing	Left Field Productions	Rombax Games	Mar 25, 2011	Mar 25, 2011	Unreleased	Nov 22, 2013	3D		
Medal of Honor	First-person shooter	Danger Close Games	Electronic Arts	Oct 12, 2010	Oct 15, 2010	Oct 21, 2010	Nov 22, 2013			
Medal of Honor: Airborne	First-person shooter	EA Los Angeles	Electronic Arts	Sep 4, 2007	Sep 7, 2007	Nov 8, 2007	Nov 22, 2013		XBO	
Medal of Honor: Warfighter	First-person shooter	Danger Close Games	Electronic Arts	Oct 23, 2012	Oct 26, 2012	Oct 25, 2012	Nov 22, 2013			
Meet the Robinsons	Action-adventure, platformer	Avalanche Software	Disney Interactive Studios	Mar 27, 2007	Mar 30, 2007	Unreleased	Nov 22, 2013		XBO	
Mega Man 9	Action & adventure	Inti Creates/Capcom	Capcom	Oct 1, 2008	Unreleased	Unreleased	Unreleased	XBLA	XBO	
Mega Man 10	Action & adventure	Inti Creates/Capcom	Capcom	Mar 31, 2010	Unreleased	Unreleased	Unreleased	XBLA	XBO	
Megamind: Ultimate Showdown	Action	THQ	THQ	Nov 2, 2010	Nov 2, 2010	Unreleased	Nov 22, 2013			
Meikyuu Cross Blood: Reloaded	Action & adventure	Kadokawa	Kadokawa	Unreleased	Unreleased	Nov 10, 2011	Unreleased			
Memories Off 6: Next Relation	Visual novel	5pb.	5pb.	Unreleased	Unreleased	Aug 27, 2009	Nov 22, 2013			
Memories Off 6: T-wave	Visual novel	5pb.	5pb.	Unreleased	Unreleased	Aug 27, 2009	Nov 22, 2013			
Memories Off: Yubikiri no Kioku	Visual novel	5pb.	5pb.	Unreleased	Unreleased	Jul 29, 2010	Nov 22, 2013			
Men in Black: Alien Crisis	Action-adventure	Fun Labs	Activision	May 22, 2012	May 25, 2012	Unreleased	Nov 22, 2013			
Mercenaries 2: World in Flames	Third-person shooter, Open World	Pandemic Studios	Electronic Arts	Aug 31, 2008	Sep 5, 2008	Nov 20, 2008	Nov 22, 2013			
Mercury Hg	Puzzle & trivia	Eiconic Games	UTV Ignition Entertainment	Sep 28, 2011	Unreleased	Unreleased	Unreleased	XBLA		
Merv Griffin's Crosswords	Family & educational	Pipeworks Software	THQ	Dec 31, 2008	Unreleased	Unreleased	Unreleased	XBLA		
Metal Gear Rising: Revengeance	Hack and slash, action	Kojima Productions	Konami	Feb 19, 2013	Feb 21, 2013	Feb 21, 2013	Nov 22, 2013		XBO	
Metal Gear Solid HD Collection	Third-person shooter, stealth, action	Kojima Productions	Konami	Nov 8, 2011	Feb 2, 2012	Nov 10, 2011	Nov 22, 2013		XBO	
Metal Gear Solid V: Ground Zeroes	Stealth, action	Kojima Productions	Konami	Mar 18, 2014	Mar 20, 2014	Mar 20, 2014	Nov 22, 2013			
Metal Gear Solid V: The Phantom Pain	Stealth, action	Kojima Productions	Konami	Sep 1, 2015	Sep 1, 2015	Sep 1, 2015	Nov 22, 2013			
Metal Gear Solid: Peace Walker HD Edition	Action-adventure, stealth	Kojima Productions	Konami	Nov 8, 2011	Feb 3, 2012	Nov 10, 2011	Feb 16, 2012		XBO	
Metal Slug 3	Classics	SNK	SNK	Jan 2, 2008	Unreleased	Unreleased	Unreleased	XBLA	XBO	
Metal Slug XX	Classics	SNK	SNK	May 19, 2010	Unreleased	Unreleased	Unreleased	XBLA	XBO	
Meteos Wars	Puzzle & trivia	Q Entertainment	Q Entertainment	Dec 10, 2008	Unreleased	Unreleased	Unreleased	XBLA		
Metro 2033	Survival horror, First-person shooter	4A Games	THQ	Mar 16, 2010	Mar 19, 2010	Unreleased	Nov 22, 2013			
Metro: Last Light	Survival horror, First-person shooter	4A Games	Deep Silver	May 14, 2013	May 17, 2013	Unreleased	Nov 22, 2013			
Michael Jackson: The Experience	Music	Ubisoft Montreal	Ubisoft	Apr 12, 2011	Apr 15, 2011	Dec 8, 2011	Apr 14, 2011	K		
Michael Phelps: Push The Limit		Blitz Games Studios	505 Games	Oct 11, 2011	Oct 14, 2011	Unreleased	Unreleased	K		
MicroBot	Shooter	Naked Sky Entertainment	Electronic Arts	Dec 29, 2010	Unreleased	Unreleased	Unreleased	XBLA		
Middle-earth: Shadow of Mordor	Action role-playing game	Monolith Productions	Warner Bros. Interactive Entertainment	Oct 7, 2014	Oct 7, 2014	Oct 7, 2014	Nov 22, 2013			
Midnight Club: Los Angeles	Racing	Rockstar San Diego	Rockstar Games	Oct 20, 2008	Oct 10, 2008	Feb 5, 2009	Nov 22, 2013		XBO	
Midway Arcade Origins	Compilation	Backbone Entertainment	Warner Bros.	Nov 6, 2012	Nov 6, 2012	Unreleased	Nov 22, 2013		XBO	
Might & Magic: Clash of Heroes HD	Role playing	Capybara Games	Ubisoft	Apr 13, 2011	Unreleased	Unreleased	Unreleased	XBLA	XBO	
Might & Magic: Duel of Champions - Forgotten Wars	Strategy & simulation	Ubisoft	Ubisoft	Jul 23, 2014	Unreleased	Unreleased	Unreleased	XBLA		
Mighty No. 9	Action & adventure	Comcept/Inti Creates	Deep Silver	Jun 21, 2016	Unreleased	Unreleased	Unreleased	XBLA		
Military Madness: Nectaris	Turn-based strategy	Backbone Entertainment	Hudson Soft	Sep 30, 2009	Unreleased	Unreleased	Unreleased	XBLA	XBO	
MindJack	Third-person shooter	feelplus	Square Enix	Jan 18, 2011	Jan 21, 2011	Jan 27, 2011	Nov 22, 2013			
Minecraft: Story Mode	Graphic adventure & interactive movie	Telltale Games	Telltale Games	Oct 27, 2015	Oct 27, 2015	Unreleased	Nov 22, 2013			
Minecraft: Story Mode Season Two	Graphic adventure & interactive movie	Telltale Games	Telltale Games	Sep 19, 2017	Sep 19, 2017	Unreleased	Unreleased			
Minecraft: Xbox 360 Edition	Sandbox	4J Studios	Microsoft Studios	May 9, 2012	May 9, 2012	May 9, 2012	Nov 22, 2013			
Minesweeper Flags	Puzzle & trivia	TikGames	Microsoft Game Studios	Feb 11, 2009	Unreleased	Unreleased	Unreleased	XBLA		
Mini Ninjas	Action-adventure	IO Interactive	Eidos Interactive	Sep 8, 2009	Sep 11, 2009	Unreleased	Nov 22, 2013			
Mini Ninjas Adventures	Kinect	Side Kick LTD	Square Enix	Jun 29, 2012	Unreleased	Unreleased	Unreleased	K XBLA		
Minute To Win It			Zoo Games	Oct 18, 2011	Unreleased	Unreleased	Unreleased	K		
Mirror's Edge	Action-adventure, Platform,	Digital Illusions CE	Electronic Arts	Nov 12, 2008	Nov 14, 2008	Dec 11, 2008	Nov 22, 2013		XBO XE	
The Misadventures of P.B. Winterbottom	Puzzle & trivia	The Odd Gentlemen	2K Play	Feb 17, 2010	Unreleased	Unreleased	Unreleased	XBLA	XBO	
Missile Command	Classics	Stainless Games/Atari	Atari	Jul 4, 2007	Unreleased	Unreleased	Unreleased	XBLA	XBO	
MLB Bobblehead Battle	Sports & recreation	Konami	Konami	Sep 28, 2011	Unreleased	Unreleased	Unreleased	XBLA		
MLB Bobblehead Pros	Sports & recreation	Konami	Konami	Jul 6, 2011	Unreleased	Unreleased	Unreleased	XBLA		
MLB Front Office Manager	Sports Management	Blue Castle Games	2k Sports	Jan 26, 2009	Jan 26, 2009	Unreleased	Nov 22, 2013			
MLB Stickball	Sports & recreation	Gaia Industries	2K Sports	Oct 8, 2008	Unreleased	Unreleased	Unreleased	XBLA		
Moe Moe 2-Ji Daisenryaku Ultra Deluxe	Shooter	SystemSoft	SystemSoft	Unreleased	Unreleased	Mar 18, 2010	Unreleased			
Mobile Ops: The One Year War	First-person shooter; third-person shooter	Dimps	Namco Bandai Games	Unreleased	Unreleased	Jun 26, 2008	Unreleased			
Momotarou Dentetsu 16 Gold	Board Game	Hudson Soft	Hudson Soft	Unreleased	Unreleased	Dec 6, 2007	Unreleased			
Monaco: What's Yours Is Mine	Action & adventure	Pocketwatch Games	Majesco	May 10, 2013	Unreleased	Unreleased	Unreleased	XBLA	XBO	
Monday Night Combat	Shooter	Uber Entertainment	Microsoft Game Studios	Aug 11, 2010	Unreleased	Unreleased	Unreleased	XBLA	XBO	
Monkey Island 2 Special Edition: LeChuck's Revenge	Classics	LucasArts	Disney Interactive Studios	Jul 7, 2010	Unreleased	Unreleased	Unreleased	XBLA	XBO	
Monopoly	Board game	EA Bright Light	Electronic Arts	Oct 22, 2008	Oct 24, 2008	Unreleased	Nov 22, 2013			
Monopoly Deal	Card & board	Asobo Studio	Ubisoft	Jan 14, 2015	Unreleased	Unreleased	Unreleased	XBLA	XBO	
Monopoly Plus	Card & board	Asobo Studio	Ubisoft	Jan 14, 2015	Unreleased	Unreleased	Unreleased	XBLA	XBO	
Monopoly Streets	Board game	Electronic Arts	Electronic Arts	Oct 26, 2010	Nov 12, 2010	Unreleased	Nov 22, 2013			
Monster High: New Ghoul in School	Adventure	Little Orbit	Little Orbit	Oct 27, 2015	Oct 27, 2015	Unreleased	Nov 22, 2013			
Monster Hunter Frontier	Action role-playing	Capcom	Microsoft Game Studios	Unreleased	Unreleased	Jun 24, 2010	Nov 22, 2013			
Monster Hunter Frontier G1	Action role-playing, update	Capcom	Capcom	Unreleased	Unreleased	Apr 17, 2013	Unreleased			
Monster Hunter Frontier G2	Action role-playing, update	Capcom	Capcom	Unreleased	Unreleased	Jul 10, 2013	Unreleased			
Monster Hunter Frontier G3	Action role-playing, update	Capcom	Capcom	Unreleased	Unreleased	Oct 16, 2013	Unreleased			
Monster Hunter Frontier G5	Action role-playing, update	Capcom	Capcom	Unreleased	Unreleased	Jul 23, 2014	Unreleased			
Monster Hunter Frontier G6	Action role-playing, update	Capcom	Capcom	Unreleased	Unreleased	Nov 19, 2014	Unreleased			
Monster Hunter Frontier G7	Action role-playing, update	Capcom	Capcom	Unreleased	Unreleased	Apr 15, 2015	Unreleased			
Monster Hunter Frontier G8	Action role-playing, update	Capcom	Capcom	Unreleased	Unreleased	Jul 22, 2015	Unreleased			
Monster Hunter Frontier G9	Action role-playing, update	Capcom	Capcom	Unreleased	Unreleased	Nov 18, 2015	Unreleased			
Monster Hunter Frontier G10	Action role-playing, update	Capcom	Capcom	Unreleased	Unreleased	Apr 21, 2016	Unreleased			
Monster Hunter Frontier GG	Action role-playing, update	Capcom	Capcom	Unreleased	Unreleased	Apr 23, 2014	Unreleased			
Monster Hunter Frontier Z	Action role-playing, update	Capcom	Capcom	Unreleased	Unreleased	Nov 9, 2016	Unreleased			
Monster Jam	Racing	Torus Games	Activision	Nov 13, 2007	May 30, 2008	Unreleased	Nov 22, 2013			
Monster Jam Battlegrounds	Racing & flying	Team 6	GameMill Entertainment	Jun 10, 2015	Unreleased	Unreleased	Unreleased	XBLA		
Monster Jam: Path of Destruction	Racing	Virtuos	Activision	Nov 9, 2010	Nov 9, 2010	Unreleased	Nov 22, 2013			
Monster Madness: Battle for Suburbia	Shoot 'em up, action-adventure	Artificial Studios	SouthPeak Games	Jun 12, 2007	Jun 22, 2007	Unreleased	Nov 22, 2013			
Monsters vs. Aliens	Action-adventure, platformer	Activision	Activision	Mar 27, 2009	Apr 2, 2009	Apr 3, 2009	Nov 22, 2013			
Moon Diver	Action & adventure	Feelplus	Square Enix	May 4, 2011	Unreleased	Unreleased	Unreleased	XBLA	XBO	
MorphX	Action-adventure, Third-person shooter	Buka Entertainment, Targem Games	505 Games	Sep 28, 2010	Sep 24, 2010	Unreleased	Nov 22, 2013			
Mortal Kombat	Fighting	NetherRealm Studios	Warner Bros. Interactive Entertainment	Apr 19, 2011	Apr 21, 2011	Unreleased	Nov 22, 2013			
Mortal Kombat Arcade Kollection	Classics	Other Ocean Interactive; NetherRealm Studios	Warner Bros. Interactive Entertainment	Aug 31, 2011	Unreleased	Unreleased	Unreleased	XBLA		
Mortal Kombat vs. DC Universe	Fighting	Midway Games	Midway Games	Nov 16, 2008	Nov 21, 2008	Unreleased	Nov 22, 2013			
Motion Explosion	Party	Artech Studios	Majesco	Nov 1, 2011	Nov 1, 2011	Unreleased	Unreleased	K		
MotionSports		Ubisoft Milan	Ubisoft	Nov 4, 2010	Nov 10, 2010	Nov 18, 2010	Unreleased	K		
MotionSports Adrenaline		Longtail Studios	Ubisoft	Nov 1, 2011	Oct 28, 2011	Unreleased	Unreleased	K		
Motocross Madness	Racing & flying	Bongfish	Microsoft Studios	Apr 10, 2013	Unreleased	Unreleased	Unreleased	XBLA	XBO	
MotoGP '06	Racing	Black Rock Studio	THQ	Jun 12, 2006	Jun 9, 2006	Oct 12, 2006	Mar 23, 2006			
MotoGP '07	Racing	Black Rock Studio	THQ	Aug 27, 2007	Aug 24, 2007	Unreleased	Nov 22, 2013			
MotoGP '08	Racing	Milestone	Capcom	Oct 28, 2008	Oct 24, 2008	Unreleased	Nov 22, 2013			
MotoGP 09/10	Racing	Monumental Games	Capcom	Mar 16, 2010	Mar 23, 2010	Mar 19, 2010	Mar 18, 2010			
MotoGP 10/11	Racing	Monumental Games	Capcom	Mar 15, 2011	Unreleased	Mar 15, 2011	Mar 15, 2011			
MotoGP 13	Racing	Milestone	Milestone	Unreleased	Unreleased	Unreleased	Nov 22, 2013			
MotoGP 14	Racing	Milestone	Namco Bandai Games	Nov 4, 2014	Nov 4, 2014	Unreleased	Nov 4, 2014			
MotoGP 15	Racing	Milestone	Namco Bandai Games	Nov 4, 2015	Unreleased	Unreleased	Nov 4, 2015			
Motorcycle Club	Racing	Kylotonn Games	Bigben Interactive	Unreleased	Mar 6, 2015	Unreleased	Unreleased			
Mr. Driller Online	Puzzle & trivia	Bandai Namco Entertainment	Bandai Namco Entertainment	Apr 2, 2008	Unreleased	Unreleased	Unreleased	XBLA	XBO	
Ms. Pac-Man	Classics	Bandai Namco Entertainment	Bandai Namco Entertainment	Jan 10, 2007	Unreleased	Unreleased	Unreleased	XBLA	XBO	
Ms. Splosion Man	Platformer	Twisted Pixel Games	Microsoft Studios	Jul 13, 2011	Jul 13, 2011	Jul 13, 2011	Jul 13, 2011	XBLA	XBO	
Muchi Muchi Pork! & Pink Sweets: Ibara Sore Kara	Shooter	Cave	Cave	Unreleased	Unreleased	Feb 24, 2011	Unreleased			
Mud - FIM Motocross World Championship	Racing	Namco Bandai Games	Milestone	Feb 26, 2013	Feb 26, 2013	Unreleased	Unreleased			
Murdered: Soul Suspect	Action-adventure, puzzle	Airtight Games,	Square Enix	Jun 3, 2014	Jun 6, 2014	Sep 4, 2014	Nov 22, 2013			
Mushihimesama	Vertically scrolling shooter, bullet hell	Cave	Cave	Unreleased	Unreleased	Feb 7, 2012	Unreleased			
Mushihime-sama Futari	Scrolling shooter, bullet hell	Cave	Cave	Unreleased	Unreleased	Nov 26, 2009	Nov 22, 2013			
Mutant Storm Empire	Shooter	PomPom Games	Microsoft Game Studios	Oct 31, 2007	Unreleased	Unreleased	Unreleased	XBLA	XBO	
Mutant Storm Reloaded	Shooter	PomPom Games	Microsoft Game Studios	Nov 22, 2005	Unreleased	Unreleased	Unreleased	XBLA	XBO	
MuvLuv	Visual novel	5pb.	5pb.	Unreleased	Unreleased	Oct 27, 2011	Nov 22, 2013			
MuvLuv Alternative	Visual novel	5pb.	5pb.	Unreleased	Unreleased	Oct 27, 2011	Nov 22, 2013			
Muv-Luv Alternative: Total Eclipse	Visual novel	5pb.	5pb.	Unreleased	Unreleased	May 16, 2013	Unreleased			
MX vs. ATV Alive	Racing	Rainbow Studios	THQ	Nov 29, 2012	Nov 29, 2011	Unreleased	Nov 22, 2013			
MX vs. ATV Reflex	Racing	Rainbow Studios	THQ	Dec 1, 2009	Feb 5, 2010	Unreleased	Nov 22, 2013		XBO	
MX vs. ATV: Supercross	Racing	Rainbow Studios	Nordic Games	Oct 28, 2014	Oct 28, 2014	Oct 28, 2014	Nov 22, 2013			
MX vs. ATV: Untamed	Racing	Rainbow Studios	THQ	Dec 17, 2007	Mar 7, 2008	Unreleased	Nov 22, 2013			
MXGP The Official Motocross Videogame	Racing	Bandai Namco	Milestone	Nov 18, 2014	Nov 18, 2014	Unreleased	Nov 22, 2013			
My Body Coach 3	Exergame	Kylotonn	Bigben Interactive	Mar 20, 2012	Oct 19, 2012	Unreleased	Unreleased			
My Horse & Me 2	Racing	Tate Interactive	Atari	Unreleased	Oct 31, 2008	Unreleased	Unreleased			
MySims SkyHeroes	Combat Flight Simulator, Sim	Maxis	Electronic Arts	Sep 28, 2010	Oct 1, 2010	Unreleased	Nov 22, 2013			
N+	Action & adventure	Slick Entertainment	Microsoft Game Studios	Feb 20, 2008	Unreleased	Unreleased	Unreleased	XBLA	XBO	
nail'd	Racing	Techland	Deep Silver	Nov 30, 2010	Feb 4, 2011	Unreleased	Nov 22, 2013			
Namco Museum Virtual Arcade	Compilation	Namco Bandai Games	Namco Bandai Games	Nov 4, 2008	May 15, 2009	Unreleased	Nov 22, 2013			
Narco Terror	Shooter	Deep Silver	Deep Silver	Jul 31, 2013	Unreleased	Unreleased	Unreleased	XBLA		
Naruto: The Broken Bond	Fighting, action-adventure	Ubisoft Montreal	Ubisoft	Nov 18, 2008	Nov 21, 2008	Unreleased	Nov 20, 2008			
Naruto: Rise of a Ninja	Fighting, RPG	Ubisoft Montreal	Ubisoft	Oct 30, 2007	Nov 2, 2007	Unreleased	Nov 1, 2007			
Naruto Shippuden: Ultimate Ninja Storm 2	Fighting	CyberConnect2	Namco Bandai Games	Oct 19, 2010	Oct 15, 2010	Oct 21, 2010	Nov 22, 2013			
Naruto Shippuden: Ultimate Ninja Storm 3	Fighting	CyberConnect2	Namco Bandai Games	Mar 8, 2013	Mar 5, 2013	Feb 18, 2013	Nov 22, 2013			
Naruto Shippuden: Ultimate Ninja Storm 3 Full Burst	Fighting, update	CyberConnect2	Namco Bandai Games	Oct 22, 2013	Oct 22, 2013	Unreleased	Jan 31, 2014			
Naruto Shippuden: Ultimate Ninja Storm Generations	Fighting	CyberConnect2	Namco Bandai Games	Mar 13, 2012	Mar 30, 2012	Feb 23, 2012	Nov 22, 2013			
Naruto Shippuden: Ultimate Ninja Storm Revolution	Fighting	CyberConnect2	Namco Bandai Games	Sep 16, 2014	Sep 12, 2014	Sep 11, 2014	Nov 22, 2013			
NASCAR 08	Racing	EA Tiburon	EA Sports	Jul 23, 2007	Nov 9, 2007	Unreleased	Nov 22, 2013			
NASCAR 09	Racing	EA Tiburon	EA Sports	Jun 10, 2008	Jun 13, 2008	Unreleased	Nov 22, 2013			
NASCAR '14	Racing	Eutechnyx	Activision	Feb 18, 2014	Feb 18, 2014	Unreleased	Nov 22, 2013			
NASCAR '15	Racing	Dusenberry Martin Racing	Activision	May 22, 2015	May 22, 2015	Unreleased	Nov 22, 2013			
NASCAR '15 Victory Edition	Racing	Dusenberry Martin Racing	Activision	Oct 18, 2015	Oct 18, 2015	Unreleased	Nov 22, 2013			
NASCAR The Game: 2011	Racing	Eutechnyx	Activision	Mar 20, 2011	Mar 20, 2011	Unreleased	Nov 22, 2013			
NASCAR The Game: Inside Line	Racing	Eutechnyx	Activision	Nov 6, 2012	Nov 6, 2012	Unreleased	Nov 22, 2013			
NASCAR Unleashed	Racing	Firebrand Games	Activision	Nov 1, 2011	Nov 1, 2011	Unreleased	Nov 22, 2013			
National Geo Challenge!	Trivia	Gusto Games	Black Bean Games	Nov 23, 2011	Mar 17, 2011	Unreleased	Unreleased			
National Geo Challenge: Wild Life	Trivia	Gusto Games	Black Bean Games	Unreleased	May 28, 2010	Unreleased	Unreleased			
Naughty Bear	Action	Artificial Mind and Movement	505 Games	Jun 29, 2010	Jun 25, 2010	Unreleased	Nov 22, 2013			
Naughty Bear: Panic in Paradise	Action & adventure	Behaviour Interactive	505 Games	Oct 10, 2012	Unreleased	Unreleased	Unreleased	XBLA		
Naval Assault: The Killing Tide	Simulation	Artech Studios	505 Games	Jun 15, 2010	Jun 11, 2010	Unreleased	Nov 22, 2013			
NBA 2K6	Sports	Visual Concepts	2K Sports	Nov 22, 2005	Apr 28, 2006	Unreleased	Mar 23, 2006			
NBA 2K7	Sports	Visual Concepts	2K Sports	Sep 25, 2006	Nov 3, 2006	Unreleased	Oct 20, 2006			
NBA 2K8	Sports	Visual Concepts	2K Sports	Oct 2, 2007	Nov 2, 2007	Unreleased	Nov 22, 2013			
NBA 2K9	Sports	Visual Concepts	2K Sports	Oct 7, 2008	Oct 3, 2008	Unreleased	Nov 22, 2013			
NBA 2K10	Sports	Visual Concepts	2K Sports	Oct 6, 2009	Oct 6, 2009	Oct 15, 2009	Nov 22, 2013			
NBA 2K10 Draft Combine	Sports & recreation	Visual Concepts	2K Sports	Aug 26, 2009	Unreleased	Unreleased	Unreleased	XBLA		
NBA 2K11	Sports	Visual Concepts	2K Sports	Oct 5, 2010	Oct 8, 2010	Oct 14, 2010	Nov 22, 2013			
NBA 2K12	Sports	Visual Concepts	2K Sports	Oct 4, 2011	Oct 7, 2011	Unreleased	Nov 22, 2013			
NBA 2K13	Sports	Visual Concepts	2K Sports	Oct 2, 2012	Oct 5, 2012	Unreleased	Nov 22, 2013	K		
NBA 2K14	Sports	Visual Concepts	2K Sports	Oct 1, 2013	Oct 3, 2013	Nov 7, 2013	Nov 22, 2013	K		
NBA 2K15	Sports	Visual Concepts	2K Sports	Oct 7, 2014	Oct 10, 2014	Nov 27, 2014	Nov 22, 2014	K		
NBA 2K16	Sports	Visual Concepts	2K Sports	Sep 29, 2015	Sep 29, 2015	Sep 29, 2015	Nov 22, 2015	K		
NBA 2K17	Sports	Visual Concepts	2K Sports	Sep 20, 2016	Sep 20, 2016	Sep 20, 2016	Nov 22, 2016	K		
NBA 2K18	Sports	Visual Concepts	2K Sports	Sep 15, 2017	Sep 15, 2017	Sep 15, 2017	Sep 15, 2017	K		
NBA Baller Beats	Rhythm	HB Studios	Majesco	Sep 11, 2012	Unreleased	Unreleased	Unreleased	K		
NBA Ballers: Chosen One	Sports	Midway Games	Midway Games	Apr 21, 2008	Apr 25, 2008	Unreleased	Unreleased			
NBA Jam	Sports	EA Canada	EA Sports	Nov 17, 2010	Nov 26, 2010	Unreleased	Nov 22, 2013			
NBA Jam: On Fire Edition	Sports & recreation	EA Sports	Electronic Arts	Oct 4, 2011	Oct 4, 2011	Unreleased	Unreleased	XBLA	XBO	
NBA Live 06	Sports	EA Canada	EA Sports	Nov 22, 2005	Dec 2, 2005	Jan 19, 2006	Unreleased			
NBA Live 07	Sports	EA Canada	EA Sports	Sep 25, 2006	Oct 20, 2006	Nov 22, 2006	Oct 19, 2006			
NBA Live 08	Sports	EA Canada	EA Sports	Oct 2, 2007	Oct 5, 2007	Nov 8, 2007	Nov 22, 2013			
NBA Live 09	Sports	EA Canada	EA Sports	Oct 7, 2008	Oct 10, 2008	Oct 23, 2008	Nov 22, 2013			
NBA Live 10	Sports	EA Canada	EA Sports	Oct 6, 2009	Oct 16, 2009	Nov 5, 2009	Nov 22, 2013			
NBA Street Homecourt	Sports	EA Canada	EA Sports	Feb 20, 2007	Mar 23, 2007	May 24, 2007	Nov 22, 2013			
NBA Unrivaled	Sports & recreation	A.C.R.O.N.Y.M. Games	Tecmo	Nov 11, 2009	Unreleased	Unreleased	Unreleased	XBLA		
NCAA Basketball 09 (Note: NCAA Basketball 09: March Madness Edition, a downloadable expansion for NCAA Basketball 09, was released on March 11, 2009.)	Sports	EA Canada	EA Sports	Nov 17, 2008	Unreleased	Unreleased	Unreleased			
NCAA Basketball 09: March Madness Edition	Sports & recreation	EA Canada	Electronic Arts	Mar 11, 2009	Unreleased	Unreleased	Unreleased	XBLA		
NCAA Basketball 10	Sports	EA Canada	EA Sports	Nov 18, 2009	Unreleased	Unreleased	Unreleased			
NCAA Football 07	Sports	EA Tiburon	EA Sports	Jul 18, 2006	Unreleased	Unreleased	Unreleased			
NCAA Football 08	Sports	EA Tiburon	EA Sports	Jul 17, 2007	Unreleased	Unreleased	Unreleased			
NCAA Football 09	Sports	EA Tiburon	EA Sports	Jul 15, 2008	Unreleased	Unreleased	Unreleased			
NCAA Football 10	Sports	EA Tiburon	EA Sports	Jul 14, 2009	Unreleased	Unreleased	Unreleased			
NCAA Football 11	Sports	EA Tiburon	EA Sports	Jul 13, 2010	Unreleased	Unreleased	Unreleased			
NCAA Football 12	Sports	EA Tiburon	EA Sports	Jul 12, 2011	Unreleased	Unreleased	Unreleased			
NCAA Football 13	Sports	EA Tiburon	EA Sports	Jul 10, 2012	Unreleased	Unreleased	Unreleased			
NCAA Football 14	Sports	EA Tiburon	EA Sports	Jul 9, 2013	Unreleased	Unreleased	Unreleased			
NCAA March Madness 07	Sports	EA Canada	EA Sports	Jan 17, 2007	Unreleased	Unreleased	Unreleased			
NCAA March Madness 08	Sports	EA Canada	EA Sports	Dec 11, 2007	Unreleased	Unreleased	Unreleased			
NCIS: The Game	Adventure	Ubisoft	Ubisoft	Nov 1, 2011	Oct 28, 2011	Unreleased	Nov 22, 2013			
Need for Speed: Carbon	Racing	EA Black Box	Electronic Arts	Oct 31, 2006	Nov 3, 2006	Dec 21, 2006	Nov 22, 2013			
Need for Speed: Hot Pursuit	Racing	Criterion Games	Electronic Arts	Nov 16, 2010	Nov 19, 2010	Dec 9, 2010	Nov 22, 2013			
Need for Speed: Most Wanted (2005)	Racing	EA Black Box	Electronic Arts	Nov 22, 2005	Dec 2, 2005	Dec 10, 2005	Mar 23, 2006			
Need for Speed: Most Wanted (2012)	Racing	Criterion Games	Electronic Arts	Oct 30, 2012	Nov 2, 2012	Nov 15, 2012	Nov 22, 2013	K		
Need for Speed: ProStreet	Racing	EA Black Box	Electronic Arts	Nov 14, 2007	Nov 23, 2007	Mar 19, 2008	Nov 22, 2013			
Need for Speed: Rivals	Racing	Ghost Games	Electronic Arts	Nov 13, 2013	Nov 13, 2013	Nov 13, 2013	Nov 22, 2013	K		
Need for Speed: Shift	Racing	Slightly Mad Studios	Electronic Arts	Sep 15, 2009	Sep 17, 2009	Sep 17, 2009	Nov 22, 2013			
Need for Speed: The Run	Racing	EA Black Box	Electronic Arts	Nov 15, 2011	Nov 18, 2011	Dec 8, 2011	Nov 22, 2013			
Need for Speed: Undercover	Racing	EA Black Box	Electronic Arts	Nov 18, 2008	Nov 21, 2008	Dec 18, 2008	Nov 22, 2013			
NeoGeo Battle Coliseum	Classics	SNK	SNK	Jun 9, 2010	Unreleased	Unreleased	Unreleased	XBLA	XBO	
NeverDead	Action	Rebellion Developments	Konami	Jan 31, 2012	Feb 3, 2012	Feb 2, 2012	Nov 22, 2013			
New Rally-X	Classics	Bandai Namco Entertainment	Bandai Namco Entertainment	Dec 27, 2006	Unreleased	Unreleased	Unreleased	XBLA	XBO	
Nexuiz	Shooter	IllFonic	THQ	Feb 29, 2012	Unreleased	Unreleased	Unreleased	XBLA		
NFL Blitz	Sports & recreation	EA Tiburon	Electronic Arts	Jan 4, 2012	Unreleased	Unreleased	Unreleased	XBLA		
NFL Head Coach 09	Sports Management	EA Tiburon	EA Sports	Sep 3, 2008	Sep 3, 2008	Unreleased	Nov 22, 2013			
NFL Tour	Sports	EA Tiburon	EA Sports	Jan 8, 2008	Feb 1, 2008	Unreleased	Nov 22, 2013			
NHL 07	Sports	EA Canada	EA Sports	Sep 12, 2006	Sep 22, 2006	Unreleased	Nov 22, 2013			
NHL 08	Sports	EA Canada	EA Sports	Sep 11, 2007	Sep 21, 2007	Unreleased	Nov 22, 2013			
NHL 09	Sports	EA Canada	EA Sports	Sep 9, 2008	Sep 12, 2008	Unreleased	Nov 22, 2013			
NHL 10	Sports	EA Canada	EA Sports	Sep 15, 2009	Sep 18, 2009	Unreleased	Nov 22, 2013			
NHL 11	Sports	EA Canada	EA Sports	Sep 7, 2010	Sep 17, 2010	Unreleased	Nov 22, 2013			
NHL 12	Sports	EA Canada	EA Sports	Sep 13, 2011	Sep 9, 2011	Unreleased	Nov 22, 2013			
NHL 13	Sports	EA Canada	EA Sports	Sep 11, 2012	Sep 11, 2012	Unreleased	Nov 22, 2013			
NHL 14	Sports	EA Canada	EA Sports	Sep 10, 2013	Sep 13, 2013	Unreleased	Nov 22, 2013			
NHL 15	Sports	EA Canada	EA Sports	Sep 9, 2014	Sep 12, 2014	Unreleased	Nov 22, 2013			
NHL: Legacy Edition	Sports	EA Canada	EA Sports	Sep 15, 2015	Sep 17, 2015	Unreleased	Sep 18, 2015			
NHL 2K6	Sports	Kush Games	2K Sports	Nov 22, 2005	Apr 28, 2006	Unreleased	Mar 23, 2006			
NHL 2K7	Sports	Kush Games	2K Sports	Sep 12, 2006	Nov 3, 2006	Unreleased	Nov 22, 2013			
NHL 2K8	Sports	Kush Games	2K Sports	Sep 11, 2007	Nov 2, 2007	Unreleased	Nov 22, 2013			
NHL 2K9	Sports	Visual Concepts	2K Sports	Sep 8, 2008	Sep 12, 2008	Apr 29, 2009	Nov 22, 2013			
NHL 2K10	Sports	Visual Concepts	2K Sports	Sep 15, 2009	Sep 18, 2009	Oct 15, 2009	Unreleased			
Nickelodeon Dance		High Voltage Software	2K Play	Nov 8, 2011	Nov 25, 2011	Nov 25, 2011		K		
Nickelodeon Dance 2		High Voltage Software	2K Play	Nov 6, 2012	Nov 6, 2012	Nov 6, 2012	Unreleased	K		
Nicktoons MLB	Sports	High Voltage Software	2K Play	Sep 13, 2011	Unreleased	Unreleased	Unreleased	K		
Nier	Action RPG	Cavia	Square Enix	Apr 27, 2010	Apr 23, 2010	Apr 22, 2010	Nov 22, 2013			
Night at the Museum: Battle of the Smithsonian	Action	Amaze Entertainment	Majesco	May 5, 2009	May 5, 2009	Unreleased	Nov 22, 2013			
NiGHTS into Dreams...	Classics	Sonic Team	Sega	Oct 5, 2012	Unreleased	Unreleased	Unreleased	XBLA	XBO	
Nike+ Kinect Training		Sumo Digital	Microsoft Studios	Oct 30, 2012	Nov 2, 2012	Unreleased	Unreleased	K		
NIN2-JUMP	Action & adventure	CAVE	CAVE	Apr 27, 2011	Unreleased	Unreleased	Unreleased	XBLA	XBO	
Ninety-Nine Nights	Hack and slash, action	Q Entertainment, Phantagram	Microsoft Game Studios	Aug 15, 2006	Sep 1, 2006	Apr 20, 2006	Aug 28, 2006			
Ninety-Nine Nights II	Hack and slash, role-playing	Q Entertainment, Feelplus	Konami	Jun 29, 2010	Sep 10, 2010	Jul 22, 2010	Nov 22, 2013			
Ninja Blade	Action-adventure	From Software	Microsoft Game Studios	Apr 7, 2009	Apr 3, 2009	Jan 29, 2009	Nov 22, 2013			
Ninja Gaiden 3	Hack and slash, action-adventure	Team Ninja	Tecmo Koei	Mar 20, 2012	Mar 23, 2012	Mar 22, 2010	Nov 22, 2013			
Ninja Gaiden 3: Razor's Edge	Hack and slash, action-adventure	Team Ninja	Tecmo	Apr 2, 2013	Apr 5, 2013	Apr 4, 2013	Nov 22, 2013		XBO	
Ninja Gaiden II	Hack and slash, action-adventure	Team Ninja	Microsoft Game Studios	Jun 3, 2008	Jun 6, 2008	Jun 5, 2008	Nov 22, 2013		XBO XE	
No Fate! Only the Power of Will	Visual novel	Alchemist	Alchemist	Unreleased	Unreleased	Feb 25, 2010	Nov 22, 2013			
No More Heroes: Heroes' Paradise	Hack and slash, action-adventure	feelplus	Marvelous Entertainment	Unreleased	Unreleased	Apr 15, 2010	Nov 22, 2013			
Nobunaga no Yabou: Tendou	Grand strategy wargame, action RPG, Turn-based strategy	Koei	Koei	Unreleased	Unreleased	Mar 4, 2010	Nov 22, 2013			
Novadrome	Racing & flying	Stainless Games	Microsoft Game Studios	Dec 20, 2006	Unreleased	Unreleased	Unreleased	XBLA		
NPPL Championship Paintball 2009	First-person shooter	Sand Grain Studios	Activision	Nov 11, 2008	Nov 11, 2008	Unreleased	Nov 22, 2013			
Nurarihyon no Mago: Hyakki Ryouran Taisen	Fighting	Arc System Works	Konami	Unreleased	Unreleased	Nov 17, 2011	Unreleased			
Obut Pétanque 2	Sports	Kylotonn	Bigben Interactive	Unreleased	Dec 14, 2014	Unreleased	Unreleased			
Of Orcs and Men	Action RPG	Cyanide Studio	Focus Home Interactive	Unreleased	Oct 11, 2013	Oct 11, 2013	Oct 11, 2013			
Omega Five	Action & adventure	Natsume Co., Ltd.	Hudson Soft	Jan 9, 2008	Unreleased	Unreleased	Unreleased	XBLA	XBO	
Omerta – City of Gangsters	Simulation game	Haemimont Games	Kalypso Media	Feb 12, 2013	Feb 1, 2013	Unreleased	Nov 22, 2013			
Onechanbara: Bikini Samurai Squad	Hack and slash	Tamsoft	D3 Publisher	Feb 10, 2009	Feb 27, 2009	Dec 14, 2006	Nov 22, 2013			
Onechanbara Z: Kagura	Hack and slash	Tamsoft	D3 Publisher	Unreleased	Feb 27, 2009	Unreleased	Unreleased			
Open Season	Action-adventure	Ubisoft	Ubisoft	Sep 19, 2006	Oct 6, 2006	Unreleased	Nov 11, 2006			
Operation Darkness	Tactical RPG	Success Corporation	Success Corporation, Atlus ^{NA}	Jun 24, 2008	Jun 24, 2008	Oct 11, 2007	Nov 22, 2013			
Operation Flashpoint: Dragon Rising	Tactical shooter, Open World	Codemasters	Codemasters	Oct 6, 2009	Oct 9, 2009	Jan 14, 2010	Nov 22, 2013		XBO	
Operation Flashpoint: Red River	Tactical shooter	Codemasters	Codemasters	Jun 7, 2011	Apr 21, 2011	Jul 28, 2011	Nov 22, 2013		XBO	
The Orange Box (Note: Half-Life 2, Half-Life 2: Episode One, Half-Life 2: Episode Two, Portal, and Team Fortress 2 combined together into one game.)	First-person shooter, puzzle	Valve	Electronic Arts	Oct 9, 2007	Oct 19, 2007	May 22, 2008	Nov 22, 2013		XBO XE	
Orc Attack: Flatulent Rebellion	Action & adventure	Casual Brothers Games	GameMill Entertainment	Oct 9, 2013	Unreleased	Unreleased	Unreleased	XBLA		
Orcs Must Die!	Strategy & simulation	Robot Entertainment	Microsoft Studios	Oct 5, 2011	Unreleased	Unreleased	Unreleased	XBLA	XBO	
Ore no Yome: Anata Dake no Hanayome	Puzzle game, Visual novel	Idea Factory	Idea Factory	Unreleased	Unreleased	Oct 28, 2010	Unreleased			
Otomedius Excellent	Scrolling shooter	Konami	Konami	Nov 1, 2011	Nov 1, 2011	Apr 21, 2011	Nov 22, 2013			
Otomedius Gorgeous	Scrolling shooter	Konami	Konami	Unreleased	Unreleased	Nov 20, 2008	Nov 22, 2013			
The Outfit	Tactical RPG	Relic Entertainment	THQ	Mar 13, 2006	Mar 17, 2006	Nov 2, 2006	Mar 23, 2006			
Outland	Platformer	Housemarque	Ubisoft	Apr 27, 2011	Unreleased	Unreleased	Unreleased	XBLA	XBO	
Outpost Kaloki X	Strategy & simulation	NinjaBee	Microsoft Game Studios	Nov 22, 2005	Unreleased	Unreleased	Unreleased	XBLA		
OutRun Online Arcade	Racing & flying	Sumo Digital	Sega	Apr 15, 2009	Unreleased	Unreleased	Unreleased	XBLA		
Over G Fighters	Combat Flight Simulator	Taito	Ubisoft	Jun 27, 2006	Jun 30, 2006	Feb 23, 2006	Nov 22, 2013			
Overlord (Note: Overlord: Raising Hell, a DLC expansion requiring the original game, was released over Xbox Live on February 15, 2008)	Action-adventure, RPG	Triumph Studios	Codemasters	Jun 26, 2007	Jun 29, 2007	May 29, 2008	Nov 22, 2013		XBO	
Overlord II	Action-adventure, RPG	Triumph Studios	Codemasters	Jun 23, 2009	Jun 26, 2009	Unreleased	Nov 22, 2013		XBO	
Pacific Rim: The Video Game	Fighting	Yuke's	Yuke's	Jul 12, 2013	Unreleased	Unreleased	Unreleased	XBLA		
Pac-Man	Classics	Bandai Namco Entertainment	Bandai Namco Entertainment	Aug 9, 2006	Unreleased	Unreleased	Unreleased	XBLA	XBO	
Pac-Man and the Ghostly Adventures	Platformer	Namco Bandai Games	Namco Bandai Games	Oct 29, 2013	Mar 7, 2014	Unreleased	Nov 22, 2013			
Pac-Man and the Ghostly Adventures 2	Platform	Namco Bandai Games	Namco Bandai Games	Oct 14, 2014	Oct 14, 2014	Unreleased	Nov 22, 2013			
Pac-Man Championship Edition	Action & adventure	Bandai Namco Entertainment	Bandai Namco Entertainment	Jun 6, 2007	Unreleased	Unreleased	Unreleased	XBLA	XBO	
Pac-Man Championship Edition DX (Note: Has an updated version as Pac-Man Championship Edition DX+)	Action & adventure	Bandai Namco Entertainment	Bandai Namco Entertainment	Nov 17, 2010	Unreleased	Unreleased	Unreleased	XBLA	XBO	
Pac-Man Museum (includes nine Pac-Man games)	Action & adventure	Bandai Namco Entertainment	Bandai Namco Entertainment	Feb 26, 2014	Unreleased	Unreleased	Unreleased	XBLA	XBO	
Painkiller: Hell & Damnation	First-person shooter	The Farm 51	Nordic Games	Unreleased	Jun 28, 2013	Unreleased	Nov 22, 2013			
Panzer General: Allied Assault	Card & board	Petroglyph Games	Ubisoft	Oct 21, 2009	Unreleased	Unreleased	Unreleased	XBLA		
Paperboy	Classics	Midway Games/ Digital Eclipse	Midway Games	Feb 14, 2007	Unreleased	Unreleased	Unreleased	XBLA		
The Path of Go	Card & board	Microsoft Research Cambridge	Microsoft Game Studios	Dec 15, 2010	Unreleased	Unreleased	Unreleased	XBLA		
Payday 2	First-person shooter, Tactical shooter	Overkill Software, Starbreeze Studios	505 Games	Aug 13, 2013	Aug 14, 2013	Unreleased	Nov 22, 2013			
PDC World Championship Darts 2008	Sports	Mere Mortals	Oxygen Interactive	Unreleased	Sep 26, 2008	Unreleased	Unreleased			
PDC World Championship Darts Pro Tour	Sports	Redoubt	Oxygen Interactive	Unreleased	Nov 26, 2010	Unreleased	Unreleased			
The Peanuts Movie: Snoopy's Grand Adventure	Platform	Beenox	Activision	Nov 3, 2015	Nov 6, 2015	Nov 3, 2015	Nov 22, 2013			
Peggle	Puzzle & trivia	PopCap Games	PopCap Games	Mar 11, 2009	Unreleased	Unreleased	Unreleased	XBLA	XBO	
Peggle 2	Puzzle & trivia	PopCap Games	Electronic Arts	May 7, 2014	Unreleased	Unreleased	Unreleased	XBLA	XBO	
Penguins of Madagascar: Dr. Blowhole Returns - Again		THQ	THQ	Sep 6, 2011	Sep 16, 2011	Unreleased	Unreleased	K		
Penny Arcade Adventures: On the Rain-Slick Precipice of Darkness Episode One	Role playing	Hothead Games	Microsoft Game Studios	May 21, 2008	Unreleased	Unreleased	Unreleased	XBLA		
Penny Arcade Adventures: On the Rain-Slick Precipice of Darkness Episode Two	Role playing	Hothead Games	Microsoft Game Studios	Oct 29, 2008	Unreleased	Unreleased	Unreleased	XBLA		
Perfect Dark	Classics	Rare/4J Studios	Microsoft Game Studios	Mar 17, 2010	Mar 17, 2010	Unreleased	Mar 17, 2010	XBLA	XBO XE	
Perfect Dark Zero	First-person shooter, stealth	Rare	Microsoft Game Studios	Nov 22, 2005	Dec 2, 2005	Dec 10, 2005	Mar 23, 2006		XBO XE	
Persona 4 Arena (Note: Known in Japan as Persona 4: The Ultimate in Mayonaka Arena)	Fighting	Arc System Works	Atlus	Aug 7, 2012	May 10, 2013	Jul 26, 2012	Nov 22, 2013		XBO	
Persona 4 Arena Ultimax	Fighting	Arc System Works	Atlus	Sep 30, 2014	Nov 21, 2014	Unreleased	Unreleased		XBO	
Peter Jackson's King Kong	Action-adventure	Ubisoft Montpellier	Ubisoft	Nov 22, 2005	Dec 2, 2005	Dec 22, 2005	Mar 30, 2006		XBO	
Phantasy Star II	Classics	Sega/ Backbone Entertainment	Sega	Jun 10, 2009	Unreleased	Unreleased	Unreleased	XBLA	XBO	
Phantasy Star Universe (Note: Phantasy Star Universe: Ambition of the Illuminus, a DLC expansion requiring the original game, was released over Xbox Live on November 20, 2007.)	Action RPG	Sonic Team	Sega	Oct 25, 2006	Nov 24, 2006	Dec 14, 2006	Nov 30, 2006			
Phantom Breaker	Fighting	5pb.	5pb.	Unreleased	Unreleased	Jun 2, 2011	Nov 22, 2013			
Phantom Breaker: Battle Grounds	Action & adventure	5pb. Division 2	5pb.	Feb 27, 2013	Unreleased	Unreleased	Unreleased	XBLA	XBO	
Phantom Breaker: Extra	Fighting	5pb.	5pb.	Unreleased	Unreleased	Sep 24, 2013	Unreleased			
Phantom: Phantom of Inferno	Visual novel	Nitro+	Nitro+	Unreleased	Unreleased	Oct 25, 2012	Nov 22, 2013			
Phineas and Ferb: Quest for Cool Stuff	Platformer	Behaviour Interactive	Majesco, 505 Games	Aug 13, 2013	Jan 18, 2014	Unreleased	Nov 22, 2013			
Pid	Action & adventure	Might and Delight	D3 Publisher	Oct 31, 2012	Unreleased	Unreleased	Unreleased	XBLA		
Pimp My Ride	Racing	Eutechnyx	Activision	Dec 6, 2006	Mar 16, 2007	Unreleased	Nov 22, 2013			
Pia Carrot e Youkoso!! 4: Natsu no Koikatsu	Dating Sim	GN Software	GN Software	Unreleased	Unreleased	Feb 24, 2011	Unreleased			
The Pinball Arcade	Classics	FarSight Studios	Alliance Digital Media	Apr 4, 2012	Unreleased	Unreleased	Unreleased	XBLA		
Pinball FX	Sports & recreation	Zen Studios	Microsoft Game Studios	Apr 25, 2007	Unreleased	Unreleased	Unreleased	XBLA	XBO	
Pinball FX 2	Sports & recreation	Zen Studios	Microsoft Game Studios	Oct 27, 2010	Unreleased	Unreleased	Unreleased	XBLA		
Pinball Hall of Fame: The Williams Collection	Sim	FarSight Studios	Crave Entertainment	Sep 16, 2009	Sep 16, 2009	Unreleased	Nov 22, 2013			
Pirates of the Caribbean: At World's End	Action-adventure	Eurocom	Buena Vista Games	May 22, 2007	May 25, 2007	Unreleased	Nov 22, 2013			
Pirates vs. Ninjas Dodgeball	Action & adventure	Blazing Lizard	Gamecock Media Group	Sep 3, 2008	Unreleased	Unreleased	Unreleased	XBLA		
Planet 51	Action-adventure	Pyro Studios	Sega	Nov 17, 2009	Nov 17, 2009	Unreleased	Nov 22, 2013			
Planets Under Attack	Strategy & simulation	Targem Games	TopWare Interactive	Nov 14, 2012	Unreleased	Unreleased	Unreleased	XBLA	XBO	
Plants vs. Zombies	Action & adventure	PopCap Games	PopCap Games	Sep 8, 2010	Unreleased	Unreleased	Unreleased	XBLA	XBO	
Plants vs. Zombies: Garden Warfare	Tower defense, Third-person shooter	PopCap Games	Electronic Arts	Feb 25, 2014	Feb 20, 2014	Sep 4, 2014	Nov 22, 2013			
PocketBike Racer	Racing	Blitz Games	King Games	Nov 19, 2006	Unreleased	Unreleased	Unreleased			
Poker Night 2	Card & board	Telltale Games	Telltale Games	Apr 24, 2013	Unreleased	Unreleased	Unreleased	XBLA		
Poker Smash	Puzzle & trivia	Void Star Creations	Microsoft Game Studios	Feb 6, 2008	Unreleased	Unreleased	Unreleased	XBLA		
Polar Panic	Action & adventure	Eiconic Games	Valcon Games	Dec 23, 2009	Unreleased	Unreleased	Unreleased	XBLA		
Pool Nation	Sports & recreation	Cherry Pop Games	Mastertronic Group	Oct 31, 2012	Unreleased	Unreleased	Unreleased	XBLA		
Port Royale 3: Pirates & Merchants	Business simulation	Gaming Minds Studio	Kalypso Media	Oct 2, 2012	Sep 7, 2012	Unreleased	Nov 22, 2013		XBO	
Portal 2	Puzzle Platform	Valve	Valve	Apr 20, 2011	Apr 22, 2011	Apr 22, 2011	Apr 22, 2011		XBO XE	
Portal: Still Alive	Puzzle & trivia	Valve	Microsoft Game Studios	Oct 22, 2008	Unreleased	Unreleased	Unreleased	XBLA	XBO XE	
Power Gig: Rise of the SixString	Music	Seven45 Studios	Seven45 Studios	Oct 19, 2010	Oct 19, 2010	Unreleased	Nov 22, 2013			
Power Rangers Super Samurai		Namco Bandai	Namco Bandai	Dec 4, 2012	Dec 7, 2012	Unreleased	Unreleased	K		
PowerUp Forever	Shooter	Blitz Arcade	Namco Bandai Games	Dec 10, 2008	Unreleased	Unreleased	Unreleased	XBLA		
PowerUp Heroes		Longtail Studios	Ubisoft	Oct 18, 2011	Oct 7, 2011	Oct 6, 2011	Jan 19, 2012	K		
Prey	First-person shooter	Human Head Studios	2K Games	Jul 11, 2006	Jul 14, 2006	Dec 28, 2006	Jul 14, 2006		XBO	
The Price is Right: The Decades	Game show, Skill	Ludia	Ubisoft	Nov 15, 2011	Nov 18, 2011	Unreleased	Nov 22, 2013	K		
Prince of Persia	Action-adventure, Platform	Ubisoft Montreal	Ubisoft	Dec 2, 2008	Dec 4, 2008	Dec 18, 2008	Nov 22, 2013		XBO	
Prince of Persia: The Forgotten Sands	Action-adventure, Platform, Hack and slash	Ubisoft	Ubisoft	May 11, 2010	May 11, 2010	May 11, 2010	Nov 22, 2013		XBO	
Prince of Persia Classic	Classics	Gameloft	Ubisoft	Jun 13, 2007	Unreleased	Unreleased	Unreleased	XBLA	XBO	
Prison Architect: Xbox 360 Edition	Strategy & simulation	Introversion Software/Double Eleven	Double Eleven	Aug 2, 2016	Unreleased	Unreleased	Unreleased	XBLA		
Prison Break: The Conspiracy	Action-adventure	ZootFly	Deep Silver	Mar 30, 2010	Mar 26, 2010	Unreleased	Nov 22, 2013			
Prize Driver	Sports	Rare	Microsoft Studios	Dec 25, 2012	Unreleased	Unreleased	Unreleased	K XBLA		
Pro Evolution Soccer 2008 (Note: Known as World Soccer Winning Eleven 2008 in Japan.)	Sports	Konami	Konami	Mar 11, 2008	Oct 26, 2007	Nov 22, 2007	Nov 22, 2013			
Pro Evolution Soccer 2009 (Note: Known as World Soccer Winning Eleven 2009 in Japan.)	Sports	Konami	Konami	Nov 12, 2008	Oct 17, 2008	Nov 27, 2008	Nov 22, 2013			
Pro Evolution Soccer 2010 (Note: Known as World Soccer Winning Eleven 2010 in Japan)	Sports	Konami	Konami	Nov 3, 2009	Oct 23, 2009	Nov 5, 2009	Nov 22, 2013			
Pro Evolution Soccer 2011 (Note: Known as World Soccer Winning Eleven 2011 in Japan)	Sports	Konami	Konami	Oct 19, 2010	Oct 8, 2010	Oct 28, 2010	Nov 22, 2013			
Pro Evolution Soccer 2012 (Note: Known as World Soccer Winning Eleven 2012 in Japan)	Sports	Konami	Konami	Sep 27, 2011	Oct 14, 2011	Unreleased	Nov 22, 2013			
Pro Evolution Soccer 2013 (Note: Known as World Soccer Winning Eleven 2013 in Japan)	Sports	Konami	Konami	Sep 25, 2012	Sep 20, 2012	Oct 4, 2012	Nov 22, 2013			
Pro Evolution Soccer 2014 (Note: Known as Winning Eleven 2014 in Japan)	Sports	Konami	Konami	Sep 20, 2013	Sep 24, 2013	Oct 3, 2013	Nov 22, 2013			
Pro Evolution Soccer 2015 (Note: Known as Winning Eleven 2015 in Japan)	Sports	Konami	Konami	Nov 11, 2014	Nov 13, 2014	Nov 13, 2014	Nov 22, 2013			
Pro Evolution Soccer 2016 (Note: Known as Winning Eleven 2016 in Japan)	Sports	Konami	Konami	Sep 15, 2015	Sep 17, 2015	Sep 18, 2015	Nov 22, 2015			
Pro Evolution Soccer 2017 (Note: Known as Winning Eleven 2017 in Japan)	Sports	Konami	Konami	Sep 13, 2016	Sep 15, 2016	Sep 15, 2016	Nov 22, 2016			
Pro Evolution Soccer 2018 (Note: Known as Winning Eleven 2018 in Japan)	Sports	Konami	Konami	Sep 12, 2017	Sep 12, 2017	Sep 12, 2017	Sep 12, 2017			
Pro Evolution Soccer 6 (Note: Known as Winning Eleven: Pro Evolution Soccer 2007 in North America and World Soccer Winning Eleven X in Japan.)	Sports	Konami	Konami	Feb 6, 2007	Oct 27, 2006	Dec 14, 2006	Nov 22, 2013			
Pro Yakyū Spirits 3	Sports	Konami	Konami	Unreleased	Unreleased	Apr 6, 2006	Unreleased			
Project Gotham Racing 3	Racing	Bizarre Creations	Microsoft Game Studios	Nov 22, 2005	Dec 2, 2005	Jan 12, 2006	Mar 23, 2006			
Project Gotham Racing 4	Racing	Bizarre Creations	Microsoft Game Studios	Oct 2, 2007	Oct 12, 2007	Oct 11, 2007	Nov 22, 2013			
Project Sylpheed	Space Combat Sim	Game Arts	Square Enix	Jul 10, 2007	Jun 29, 2007	Sep 28, 2006	Nov 22, 2013			
Prototype	Action, Open World	Radical Entertainment	Sierra Entertainment	Jun 9, 2009	Jun 12, 2009	Unreleased	Nov 22, 2013			
Prototype 2	Action, Open World	Radical Entertainment	Activision	Apr 24, 2012	Apr 27, 2012	Unreleased	Nov 22, 2013			
Puddle	Puzzle & trivia	Neko Entertainment	Konami	Jan 25, 2012	Unreleased	Unreleased	Unreleased	XBLA		
Pure	Racing	Black Rock Studio	Disney Interactive Studios	Sep 16, 2008	Sep 26, 2008	Jun 25, 2009	Nov 22, 2013		XBO	
Pure Football (Note: Known as Pure Futbol in North America.)	Sports	Ubisoft Vancouver	Ubisoft	Jun 1, 2010	May 28, 2010	Unreleased	Nov 22, 2013			
Puss in Boots		Blitz Games	THQ	Oct 25, 2011	Dec 2, 2011	Unreleased	Unreleased	K		
Putty Squad	Platformer	System 3	System 3	Jun 25, 2014	Unreleased	Unreleased	Unreleased	XBLA	XBO	
Puzzle Arcade	Puzzle & trivia	CTXM	Square Enix	Dec 24, 2008	Dec 24, 2008	Unreleased	Unreleased	XBLA		
Puzzle Bobble a.k.a. Bust-A-Move Live!	Puzzle & trivia	Taito	Taito	Sep 30, 2009	Unreleased	Unreleased	Unreleased	XBLA		
Puzzle Chronicles	Puzzle & trivia	Infinite Interactive	Konami	Apr 21, 2010	Unreleased	Unreleased	Unreleased	XBLA		
Puzzle Quest 2	Puzzle & trivia	Infinite Interactive	D3 Publisher	Jun 30, 2010	Unreleased	Unreleased	Unreleased	XBLA	XBO	
Puzzle Quest: Challenge of the Warlords	Puzzle & trivia	Infinite Interactive	D3 Publisher	Oct 10, 2007	Unreleased	Unreleased	Unreleased	XBLA	XBO	
Puzzle Quest: Galactrix	Puzzle & trivia	Infinite Interactive	D3 Publisher	Apr 8, 2009	Unreleased	Unreleased	Unreleased	XBLA	XBO	
Puzzlegeddon	Puzzle & trivia	Pieces Interactive	Tecmo	Dec 16, 2009	Unreleased	Unreleased	Unreleased	XBLA	XBO	
Qix++	Action & adventure	Taito	Taito	Dec 9, 2009	Unreleased	Unreleased	Unreleased	XBLA	XBO	
Quake 4 (Note: Quake II was included with the bonus disc that came with Quake 4.)	First-person shooter	Raven Software	Activision	Nov 22, 2005	Dec 2, 2005	Unreleased	Mar 23, 2006			
Quake Arena Arcade	Action & adventure	id Software/Pi Studios	Bethesda Softworks	Dec 15, 2010	Unreleased	Unreleased	Unreleased	XBLA		
Quantum Conundrum	Puzzle & trivia	Airtight Games	Square Enix	Jul 11, 2012	Unreleased	Unreleased	Unreleased	XBLA	XBO	
Quantum Theory	Third-person shooter	Team Tachyon	Tecmo	Sep 28, 2010	Sep 24, 2010	Sep 30, 2010	Nov 22, 2013			
Quarrel	Family & educational	Denki	UTV Ignition Entertainment	Jan 25, 2012	Unreleased	Unreleased	Unreleased	XBLA		
Qubed (Note: Qubed is a compilation of three Xbox Live Arcade games: Every Extend Extra Extreme, Lumines Live!, and Rez HD.)	Rail shooter, puzzle	Q Entertainment	Atari	Sep 15, 2009	Sep 18, 2009	Unreleased	Nov 22, 2013			
R.B.I. Baseball 14	Sports & recreation	Behaviour Interactive	MLB Advanced Media	Apr 9, 2014	Unreleased	Unreleased	Unreleased	XBLA		
R.I.P.D. Rest in Peace Department the Game	Shooter	Saber Interactive	Atlus	Jul 17, 2013	Unreleased	Unreleased	Unreleased	XBLA		
R.U.S.E.	Real-time strategy	Eugen Systems	Ubisoft	Sep 7, 2010	Sep 10, 2010	Unreleased	Sep 9, 2010		XBO	
Rabbids Invasion: The Interactive TV Show	Party	Ubisoft	Ubisoft	Nov 4, 2014	Nov 4, 2014	Unreleased	Nov 22, 2013	K		
Race Driver: Grid (Note: Known as simply Grid in North America.)	Racing	Codemasters	Codemasters	Jun 3, 2008	May 30, 2008	Jan 15, 2009	Nov 22, 2013			
Race Pro	Racing	SimBin	Atari	Feb 17, 2009	Feb 20, 2009	Unreleased	Nov 22, 2013			
Radiant Silvergun	Shooter	Treasure	Microsoft Studios	Sep 14, 2011	Unreleased	Unreleased	Unreleased	XBLA	XBO	
Radirgy Noa Massive	Scrolling shooter	MileStone Inc.	MileStone Inc.	Unreleased	Unreleased	Oct 28, 2010	Nov 22, 2013			
Rage	First-person shooter, Racing, Open World	Id Software	Bethesda Softworks	Oct 4, 2011	Oct 7, 2011	Oct 6, 2011	Nov 22, 2013		XBO	
Raiden Fighters Aces	Compilation	GULTI Co Ltd	Success Corporation	May 7, 2009	Unreleased	Mar 27, 2008	Unreleased			
Raiden IV	Scrolling shooter	MOSS	Taito	Sep 8, 2009	Unreleased	Sep 11, 2008	Unreleased		XBO	
Rainbow Islands: Towering Adventure!	Platformer	Taito	Taito	Oct 28, 2009	Unreleased	Unreleased	Unreleased	XBLA		
Rambo: The Video Game	First-person shooter, action-adventure, stealth	Teyon	Reef Entertainment	Unreleased	Unreleased	Feb 21, 2014	Nov 22, 2013			
Rango	Action-adventure	Behaviour Interactive	Electronic Arts, Paramount Digital Entertainment	Mar 1, 2011	Mar 1, 2011	Unreleased	Nov 22, 2013			
Rapala Fishing Frenzy 2009	Hunting/Fishing	Fun Labs	Activision	Sep 2, 2008	Oct 17, 2008	Unreleased	Nov 22, 2013			
Rapala for Kinect		Activision	Activision	Nov 15, 2011	Nov 18, 2011	Unreleased	Unreleased	K		
Rapala Pro Bass Fishing	Hunting/Fishing	Fun Labs	Activision	Sep 24, 2010	Sep 28, 2010	Unreleased	Nov 22, 2013			
Rapala Tournament Fishing	Hunting/Fishing	Activision	Activision	Nov 21, 2006	Mar 16, 2007	Unreleased	Nov 22, 2013			
Raskulls	Family & educational	Halfbrick Studios	Microsoft Game Studios	Dec 29, 2010	Unreleased	Unreleased	Unreleased	XBLA	XBO	
Ratatouille	Action	Heavy Iron Studios	THQ	Jun 26, 2007	Sep 28, 2007	Unreleased	Nov 22, 2013			
The Raven: Legacy of a Master Thief	Action & adventure	King Art Games	THQ Nordic	Dec 4, 2013	Unreleased	Unreleased	Unreleased	XBLA		
Raven Squad: Operation Hidden Dagger	RTS, First-person shooter	Atomic Motion	Evolved, SouthPeak Games ^{EU}	Aug 25, 2009	Sep 18, 2009	Unreleased	Nov 22, 2013			
Raving Rabbids: Alive & Kicking		Ubisoft Milan, Ubisoft Paris	Ubisoft	Nov 8, 2011	Nov 4, 2011	Unreleased	Nov 3, 2011	K		
Rayman 3 HD	Action & adventure	Ubisoft Shanghai	Ubisoft	Mar 21, 2012	Unreleased	Unreleased	Unreleased	XBLA	XBO	
Rayman Legends	Platform	Ubisoft Montpellier	Ubisoft	Sep 3, 2013	Aug 30, 2013	Unreleased	Nov 22, 2013		XBO	
Rayman Origins	Platform	Ubisoft Montpellier	Ubisoft	Oct 15, 2011	Oct 24, 2011	Unreleased	Nov 22, 2013		XBO	
Rayman Raving Rabbids	Party	Ubisoft Montpellier	Ubisoft	Apr 24, 2007	Apr 5, 2007	Unreleased	Nov 22, 2013		XBO	
RayStorm HD	Shooter	Taito	Taito	May 5, 2010	Unreleased	Unreleased	Unreleased	XBLA		
Reaction Rally	Sports	Rare	Microsoft Studios	Dec 25, 2012	Unreleased	Unreleased	Unreleased	K XBLA		
Real Steel	Fighting	Yuke's	Yuke's	Oct 12, 2011	Unreleased	Unreleased	Unreleased	XBLA		
Realms of Ancient War - a.k.a. R.A.W.	Action & adventure	Wizarbox	Focus Home Interactive	Sep 19, 2012	Unreleased	Unreleased	Unreleased	XBLA		
Record of Agarest War Zero	Tactical RPG	Compile Heart	Idea Factory	Jun 14, 2011	Jun 14, 2011	Jul 29, 2010	Nov 22, 2013			
Record of Agarest War: Re-appearance	Tactical RPG	Compile Heart	Compile Heart	Unreleased	Unreleased	Nov 27, 2008	Nov 22, 2013			
Red Bull Crashed Ice Kinect	Kinect	Bongfish	Microsoft Studios	Nov 30, 2012	Unreleased	Unreleased	Unreleased	K XBLA		
Red Bull X-Fighters	Racing & flying	Xendex	Konami	Sep 14, 2011	Unreleased	Unreleased	Unreleased	XBLA		
Red Dead Redemption: Undead Nightmare (Note: The retail disc is a stand-alone expansion; the downloadable version requires Red Dead Redemption.)	Third-person, Open World, Western, stand-alone expansion	Rockstar San Diego	Rockstar Games	Nov 23, 2010	Nov 26, 2010	Unreleased	Nov 22, 2013			
Red Dead Redemption (Note: A DLC expansion pack titled Red Dead Redemption: Undead Nightmare was later released on October 26, 2010, on the Xbox Live Marketplace and the PlayStation Network.)	Third-person, Open World, Western	Rockstar San Diego	Rockstar Games	May 18, 2010	May 21, 2010	May 21, 2010	Nov 22, 2013		XBO XE	
Red Faction: Armageddon	Third-person shooter	Volition	THQ	Jun 7, 2011	Jun 10, 2011	Jun 9, 2011	Nov 22, 2013		XBO	
Red Faction: Battlegrounds	Shooter	THQ Digital Warrington	THQ	Apr 6, 2011	Unreleased	Unreleased	Unreleased	XBLA	XBO	
Red Faction: Guerrilla	Third-person shooter, Open World	Volition	THQ	Jun 2, 2009	Jun 5, 2009	Aug 6, 2009	Nov 22, 2013			
Red Johnson's Chronicles - One Against All	Action & adventure	Lexis Numérique	Lexis Numérique	Sep 12, 2012	Unreleased	Unreleased	Unreleased	XBLA		
Rekoil: Liberator	Shooter	Plastic Piranha	505 Games	Jan 29, 2014	Unreleased	Unreleased	Unreleased	XBLA		
Remember Me	Action-adventure, Third-person shooter, stealth, Interactive cinema	Dontnod Entertainment	Capcom	Jun 4, 2013	Jun 7, 2013	Jun 6, 2013	Nov 22, 2013			
Renegade Ops	Action & adventure	Avalanche Studios	Sega	Sep 14, 2011	Unreleased	Unreleased	Unreleased	XBLA		
Resident Evil HD Remaster	Survival horror	Capcom	Capcom	Jan 20, 2015	Jan 20, 2015	Nov 27, 2014	Jan 20, 2015			
Resident Evil 4 (Note: Known as BioHazard 4 in Japan.)	Third-person shooter, survival horror	Capcom	Capcom	Unreleased	Oct 2, 2012	Oct 4, 2012	Nov 22, 2013			
Resident Evil 5 (Note: Known as BioHazard 5 in Japan.)	Third-person shooter, survival horror	Capcom	Capcom	Mar 13, 2009	Mar 13, 2009	Mar 12, 2009	Nov 22, 2013			
Resident Evil 6 (Note: Known as BioHazard 6 in Japan.)	Third-person shooter, survival horror	Capcom	Capcom	Oct 2, 2012	Oct 2, 2012	Oct 4, 2012	Nov 22, 2013			
Resident Evil – Code: Veronica X	Survival horror	Capcom	Capcom	Sep 27, 2011	Sep 27, 2011	Mar 13, 2012	Nov 15, 2011		XBO	
Resident Evil Zero HD Remaster	Survival horror	Capcom	Capcom	Jan 19, 2016	Jan 19, 2016	Jan 21, 2016	Jan 19, 2016			
Resident Evil: Operation Raccoon City	Third-person shooter, survival horror	Slant Six Games	Capcom	Mar 20, 2012	Mar 23, 2012	Apr 26, 2012	Nov 22, 2013			
Resident Evil: Revelations (Note: Known as Biohazard Revelations in Japan.)	Third-person shooter, survival horror	Capcom, Tose	Capcom	May 21, 2013	May 24, 2013	May 23, 2013	May 23, 2013			
Resident Evil: Revelations 2 (Note: Known as Biohazard Revelations 2 in Japan.)	Third-person shooter, survival horror	Capcom, Tose	Capcom	Mar 26, 2015	Mar 26, 2015	Mar 26, 2015	Nov 22, 2013			
Resonance of Fate (Note: Known as End of Eternity in Japan.)	RPG	tri-Ace	Sega	Mar 9, 2010	Mar 26, 2010	Jan 28, 2010	Nov 22, 2013			
Retro City Rampage/ Retro City Rampage: DX	Action & adventure	Vblank Entertainment	D3 Publisher	Jan 2, 2013; Nov 12, 2014	Unreleased	Unreleased	Unreleased	XBLA		
Rez HD	Shooter	Q Entertainment	Microsoft Game Studios	Jan 30, 2008	Unreleased	Unreleased	Unreleased	XBLA		
Rhythm Party/Boom Boom Dance	Kinect	Konami	Konami	Feb 1, 2012	Unreleased	Unreleased	Unreleased	K XBLA		
Ride	Racing	Bandai Namco Games, PQube ^{EU}	Milestone srl	Unreleased	Unreleased	Unreleased	Nov 22, 2013			
Ride to Hell: Retribution	Action-adventure	Eutechnyx	Deep Silver	Jun 24, 2013	Jun 25, 2013	Unreleased	Nov 22, 2013			
Ridge Racer 6	Racing	Namco Bandai Games	Namco Bandai Games	Nov 22, 2005	Jan 20, 2006	Dec 10, 2005	Unreleased			
Ridge Racer Unbounded	Racing	Bugbear Entertainment	Namco Bandai Games	Mar 6, 2012	Mar 30, 2012	Apr 5, 2012	Nov 22, 2013			
Rio	Party Game	THQ, Eurocom Entertainment Software	THQ	Apr 12, 2011	Apr 8, 2011	Unreleased	Nov 22, 2013			
Rise of Nightmares		Sega Wow	Sega	Sep 6, 2011	Sep 9, 2011	Sep 8, 2011	Sep 14, 2011	K		
Rise of the Argonauts	Action RPG	Liquid Entertainment	Codemasters	Nov 18, 2008	Dec 21, 2008	Unreleased	Nov 22, 2013			
Rise of the Guardians	Action-adventure	Torus Games	D3 Publisher^{NA}, Namco Bandai Games^{EU/AU}	Nov 20, 2012	Nov 23, 2012	Nov 29, 2012	Nov 22, 2013			
Rise of the Tomb Raider	Action-adventure, Platform	Crystal Dynamics	Square Enix	Nov 10, 2015	Nov 10, 2015	Nov 10, 2015	Nov 22, 2013			
Risen	Action RPG, Open World	Piranha Bytes	Deep Silver	Feb 23, 2010	Oct 2, 2009	Unreleased	Nov 22, 2013			
Risen 2: Dark Waters	Action RPG, Open World	Piranha Bytes	Deep Silver	Jul 31, 2012	Aug 3, 2012	Unreleased	Nov 22, 2013			
Risen 3: Titan Lords	Action RPG, Open World	Piranha Bytes	Deep Silver	Aug 15, 2014	Aug 15, 2014	Unreleased	Nov 22, 2013			
Risk	Card & board	Zoë Mode	Ubisoft	Apr 29, 2015	Unreleased	Unreleased	Unreleased	XBLA		
Risk: Factions	Card & board	Stainless Games	Electronic Arts	Jun 23, 2010	Unreleased	Unreleased	Unreleased	XBLA		
Risk: Urban Assault	Card & board	Ubisoft	Ubisoft	Aug 2, 2016	Unreleased	Unreleased	Unreleased	XBLA	XBO	
Robert Ludlum's The Bourne Conspiracy	Third-person shooter	High Moon Studios	Sierra Entertainment	Jun 3, 2008	Jun 27, 2008	Unreleased	Nov 22, 2013			
RoboBlitz	Action & adventure	Naked Sky Entertainment	Microsoft Game Studios	Dec 6, 2006	Unreleased	Unreleased	Unreleased	XBLA	XBO	
Robotics;Notes	Visual novel	5pb.	5pb.	Unreleased	Unreleased	Jun 28, 2012	Unreleased			
Robotron: 2084	Classics	Midway Games/ Digital Eclipse	Midway Games	Jan 6, 2006	Unreleased	Unreleased	Unreleased	XBLA		
Rock Band	Music	Harmonix	MTV Games	Nov 20, 2007	May 23, 2008	Unreleased	Nov 22, 2013			
Rock Band 2	Music	Harmonix	MTV Games	Sep 14, 2008	Nov 21, 2008	Unreleased	Nov 22, 2013			
Rock Band 3	Music	Harmonix	MTV Games	Oct 26, 2010	Oct 29, 2010	Unreleased	Nov 22, 2013			
Rock Band Blitz	Music	Harmonix	Harmonix	Aug 29, 2012	Unreleased	Unreleased	Unreleased	XBLA		
Rock Band Classic Rock Track Pack	Music, stand-alone expansion	Harmonix	MTV Games	May 19, 2009	May 19, 2009	Unreleased	Nov 22, 2013			
Rock Band Country Track Pack	Music, stand-alone expansion	Harmonix	MTV Games	Jul 21, 2009	Jul 21, 2009	Unreleased	Nov 22, 2013			
Rock Band Country Track Pack 2	Music, stand-alone expansion	Harmonix	MTV Games	Feb 1, 2011	Feb 1, 2011	Unreleased	Nov 22, 2013			
Rock Band Metal Track Pack	Music, stand-alone expansion	Harmonix	MTV Games	Oct 13, 2009	Oct 13, 2009	Unreleased	Nov 22, 2013			
Rock Band Track Pack Volume 2	Music, stand-alone expansion	Harmonix	MTV Games	Nov 18, 2008	Nov 18, 2008	Unreleased	Nov 22, 2013			
Rock of Ages	Strategy & simulation	ACE Team	Atlus	Aug 31, 2011	Unreleased	Unreleased	Unreleased	XBLA		
Rock of the Dead	Music	Epicenter Studios	Conspiracy Entertainment, UFO Interactive	Oct 19, 2010	Oct 19, 2010	Unreleased	Nov 22, 2013			
Rock Revolution	Music	Zoë Mode	Konami	Oct 14, 2008	May 15, 2009	Unreleased	Nov 22, 2013			
Rocket Knight	Action & adventure	Climax Studios	Konami	May 12, 2010	Unreleased	Unreleased	Unreleased	XBLA	XBO	
Rocket Riot	Action & adventure	Codeglue	THQ	Jun 17, 2009	Unreleased	Unreleased	Unreleased	XBLA		
RocketBowl	Sports & recreation	Large Animal Games/ 21-6 Productions	D3 Publisher	Sep 10, 2008	Unreleased	Unreleased	Unreleased	XBLA		
Rocketmen: Axis of Evil	Action & adventure	A.C.R.O.N.Y.M. Games	Capcom	Mar 5, 2008	Unreleased	Unreleased	Unreleased	XBLA		
Rocksmith	Music video game	Ubisoft San Francisco	Ubisoft	Oct 18, 2011	Sep 28, 2012	Oct 11, 2012	Nov 22, 2013			
Rocksmith 2014 Edition	Music video game	Ubisoft	Ubisoft	Oct 22, 2013	Oct 25, 2013	Unreleased	Nov 22, 2013			
Rockstar Games Presents Table Tennis	Sports	Rockstar San Diego	Rockstar Games	May 22, 2006	May 26, 2006	Oct 12, 2006	May 26, 2006		XBO	
Rocky and Bullwinkle	Family & educational	Zen Studios	Microsoft Game Studios	Apr 16, 2008	Unreleased	Unreleased	Unreleased	XBLA		
Rogue Warrior	First-person shooter	Rebellion Developments	Bethesda Softworks	Dec 1, 2009	Dec 1, 2009	Unreleased	Nov 22, 2013			
Roogoo	Puzzle & trivia	Spidermonk Entertainment	SouthPeak Games	Jun 4, 2008	Unreleased	Unreleased	Unreleased	XBLA		
Root Beer Tapper	Classics	Midway Games/ Digital Eclipse	Midway Games	Feb 7, 2007	Unreleased	Unreleased	Unreleased	XBLA		
Root Double: Before Crime * After Days	Visual novel	Yeti	Yeti	Unreleased	Unreleased	Jun 14, 2012	Unreleased			
Rotastic	Action & adventure	Dancing Dots Studio	Focus Home Interactive	Sep 21, 2011	Unreleased	Unreleased	Unreleased	XBLA		
R-Type Dimensions (R-Type & R-Type II)	Shooter	Southend Interactive/ Tozai Games	Microsoft Game Studios	Feb 4, 2009	Unreleased	Unreleased	Unreleased	XBLA	XBO	
Rugby 15	Sports	HB Studios	Maximum Family Games, Big Ben Interactive	Feb 10, 2015	Nov 21, 2014	Nov 21, 2014	Unreleased			
Rugby Challenge 2	Sports	Tru Blu Entertainment	Sidhe	Unreleased	Unreleased	Jun 13, 2013	Nov 22, 2013			
Rugby Challenge 3	Sports	Wicked Witch Software	Alternative Software	Apr 22, 2016	Apr 22, 2016	Unreleased	Apr 22, 2016			
Rugby League Live	Sports game	Big Ant Studios	Tru Blu Entertainment	Unreleased	Unreleased	Unreleased	Nov 5, 2010			
Rugby League Live 2	Sports game	Big Ant Studios	Tru Blu Entertainment	Unreleased	Unreleased	Unreleased	Oct 9, 2012			
Rugby League Live 3	Sports game	Tru Blu Entertainment	Sidhe	Unreleased	Unreleased	Jun 13, 2013	Nov 22, 2013			
Rugby World Cup 2011	Sports	HB Studios	505 Games	Sep 6, 2011	Aug 26, 2011	Aug 26, 2011	Nov 22, 2013			
Rugby World Cup 2015	Sports	HB Studios	505 Games	Sep 4, 2015	Sep 4, 2015	Sep 4, 2015	Sep 4, 2015			
Rumble Roses XX	Fighting	Konami, Yuke's	Konami	Mar 28, 2006	May 12, 2006	Mar 30, 2006	Nov 22, 2013		XBO	
Runner2	Platformer	Gaijin Games	Aksys Games	Feb 27, 2013	Feb 27, 2013	Feb 27, 2013	Feb 27, 2013	XBLA	XBO	
Rush'n Attack	Classics	Konami/Digital Eclipse	Microsoft Game Studios	May 23, 2007	Unreleased	Unreleased	Unreleased	XBLA		
Rush'n Attack: Ex-Patriot	Platformer	Vatra Games	Konami	Mar 30, 2011	Unreleased	Unreleased	Unreleased	XBLA		
The Saboteur	Action-adventure	Pandemic Studios	Electronic Arts	Dec 8, 2009	Dec 8, 2009	Unreleased	Nov 22, 2013			
Sacred 2: Fallen Angel	Action RPG	Ascaron	Ascaron	May 12, 2009	Jun 5, 2009	Unreleased	Nov 22, 2013			
Sacred 3	Action RPG	Keen Games	Deep Silver	Aug 5, 2014	Aug 1, 2014	Unreleased	Nov 22, 2013		XBO	
Sacred Citadel	Action & adventure	Southend Interactive	Deep Silver	Apr 17, 2013	Unreleased	Unreleased	Unreleased	XBLA	XBO	
Saints Row	Action-adventure, Open World	Volition	THQ	Aug 29, 2006	Sep 1, 2006	Jun 21, 2007	Aug 31, 2006		XBO	
Saints Row 2	Action-adventure, Open World	Volition	THQ	Oct 14, 2008	Oct 17, 2008	Dec 4, 2008	Nov 22, 2013		XBO	
Saints Row: Gat out of Hell	Action-adventure, Open World, stand-alone expansion	Volition	Deep Silver	Jan 20, 2015	Jan 23, 2015	Jan 23, 2015	Nov 22, 2013		XBO	
Saints Row: The Third	Action-adventure, Open World	Volition	THQ	Nov 15, 2011	Nov 18, 2011	Nov 17, 2011	Nov 22, 2013		XBO	
Saints Row IV	Action-adventure, Open World	Volition	Deep Silver	Aug 20, 2013	Aug 23, 2013	Aug 23, 2013	Nov 22, 2013		XBO	
Sakura Flamingo Archives	Shooter	MileStone Inc.	Klon Co., Ltd.	Unreleased	Unreleased	Nov 27, 2014	Unreleased			
Sam & Max Beyond Time and Space	Action & adventure	Telltale Games	Microsoft Game Studios	Oct 14, 2009	Unreleased	Unreleased	Unreleased	XBLA	XBO	
Sam & Max Save the World	Action & adventure	Telltale Games	Microsoft Game Studios	Jun 17, 2009	Unreleased	Unreleased	Unreleased	XBLA	XBO	
Samurai Shodown II	Classics	SNK	SNK	Sep 10, 2008	Unreleased	Unreleased	Unreleased	XBLA	XBO	
Samurai Shodown Sen	Fighting	SNK Playmore	SNK Playmore	Mar 30, 2010	Apr 16, 2010	Dec 10, 2009	Nov 22, 2013			
Samurai Warriors 2	Hack and slash	Omega Force	Koei	Sep 19, 2006	Sep 22, 2006	Aug 17, 2006	Nov 22, 2013			
Samurai Warriors 2: Empires	Hack and slash, stand-alone expansion	Omega Force	Koei	Feb 27, 2007	Mar 16, 2007	Unreleased	Nov 22, 2013			
Sanctum 2	Strategy & simulation	Coffee Stain Studios	D3 Publisher	May 15, 2013	Unreleased	Unreleased	Unreleased	XBLA		
Saw	Third-person shooter, survival horror	Zombie Studios	Konami	Oct 6, 2009	Nov 20, 2009	Unreleased	Nov 22, 2013			
Saw II: Flesh & Blood	Action, survival horror	Zombie Studios	Konami	Oct 19, 2010	Oct 19, 2010	Unreleased	Nov 22, 2013			
SBK-08: Superbike World Championship (Note: Known as SBK: Superbike World Championship in North America.)	Racing	Milestone	Koch Media	Nov 8, 2008	Aug 1, 2008	Unreleased	Jun 26, 2008			
SBK-09: Superbike World Championship	Racing	Milestone	Koch Media	Unreleased	Unreleased	Unreleased	Nov 22, 2013			
SBK 2011: Superbike World Championship	Racing	Milestone	Black Bean Games	Unreleased	May 13, 2011	Unreleased	Unreleased			
SBK Generations	Racing	Milestone	Black Bean Games	Jun 7, 2012	Jun 1, 2012	Unreleased	Unreleased			
SBK X: Superbike World Championship	Racing	Milestone	Black Bean Games	Oct 19, 2010	Jun 4, 2010	Unreleased	Nov 22, 2013			
Scarygirl	Platformer	TikGames	Square Enix	Jan 18, 2012	Unreleased	Unreleased	Unreleased	XBLA	XBO	
Scene It? Box Office Smash	Party	Krome Studios, Screenlife Games	Microsoft Game Studios	Oct 28, 2008	Nov 14, 2008	Unreleased	Nov 22, 2013			
Scene It? Bright Lights! Big Screen!	Party	Screenlife Games	Warner Bros. Interactive Entertainment	Dec 9, 2009	Dec 9, 2009	Unreleased	Nov 22, 2013			
Scene It? Lights, Camera, Action	Party	Screenlife Games	Microsoft Game Studios	Nov 6, 2007	Nov 16, 2007	Unreleased	Nov 22, 2013			
Scene It? Movie Night	Family & educational	Sarbakan	Screenlife Games	Nov 30, 2011	Unreleased	Unreleased	Unreleased	XBLA		
Schizoid	Action & adventure	Torpex Games	Microsoft Game Studios	Jul 9, 2008	Unreleased	Unreleased	Unreleased	XBLA		
SCORE International Baja 1000	Racing	Left Field Productions	Activision	Oct 28, 2008	Nov 21, 2008	Unreleased	Nov 22, 2013			
Scott Pilgrim vs. the World: The Game	Fighting	Ubisoft Montreal/ Ubisoft Chengdu	Ubisoft	Aug 25, 2010	Unreleased	Unreleased	Unreleased	XBLA		
Scourge: Outbreak	Action & adventure	Tragnarion Studios	UFO Interactive Games	Jul 3, 2013	Unreleased	Unreleased	Unreleased	XBLA		
Scramble	Classics	Konami/Digital Eclipse	Konami	Sep 13, 2006	Unreleased	Unreleased	Unreleased	XBLA		
Scrap Metal	Racing & flying	Slick Entertainment	Microsoft Game Studios	Mar 10, 2010	Unreleased	Unreleased	Unreleased	XBLA	XBO	
Screamride	Puzzle	Frontier Developments	Microsoft Studios	Mar 3, 2015	Mar 6, 2015	Unreleased	Nov 22, 2013		XBO	
Screwjumper!	Action & adventure	Frozen Codebase	THQ	Nov 11, 2007	Unreleased	Unreleased	Unreleased	XBLA		
Sea Life Safari	Family & educational	Wanako Games	Activision	Jun 18, 2008	Unreleased	Unreleased	Unreleased	XBLA		
The Secret of Monkey Island: Special Edition	Classics	LucasArts	Disney Interactive Studios	Jul 15, 2009	Unreleased	Unreleased	Unreleased	XBLA	XBO	
Secret Service	First-person shooter	Cauldron	Activision	Nov 4, 2008	Mar 13, 2009	Unreleased	Nov 22, 2013			
Section 8	First-person shooter	TimeGate Studios	SouthPeak Games	Sep 4, 2009	Sep 11, 2009	Unreleased	Nov 22, 2013			
Section 8: Prejudice	Shooter	TimeGate Studios	TimeGate Studios	Apr 20, 2011	Unreleased	Unreleased	Unreleased	XBLA		
Sega Bass Fishing	Classics	Sims	Sega	Oct 5, 2011	Unreleased	Unreleased	Unreleased	XBLA	XBO	
Sega Rally Online Arcade	Racing & flying	Sega	Sega	May 18, 2011	Unreleased	Unreleased	Unreleased	XBLA		
Sega Rally Revo	Racing	Sega Racing Studio	Sega	Oct 9, 2007	Sep 28, 2007	Jan 31, 2008	Nov 22, 2013			
Sega Superstars Tennis	Sports	Sumo Digital	Sega	Mar 18, 2008	Mar 28, 2008	Unreleased	Nov 22, 2013			
Sega Vintage Collection: Alex Kidd & Co. (Alex Kidd in Miracle World, Super Hang-On, The Revenge of Shinobi)	Classics	Sega/M2	Sega	May 23, 2012	Unreleased	Unreleased	Unreleased	XBLA	XBO	
Sega Vintage Collection: Golden Axe (Golden Axe, II, III)	Classics	Sega/M2	Sega	May 30, 2012	Unreleased	Unreleased	Unreleased	XBLA	XBO	
Sega Vintage Collection: Monster World (Wonder Boy in Monster Land, Wonder Boy in Monster World, Monster World IV)	Classics	Sega/M2	Sega	May 23, 2012	Unreleased	Unreleased	Unreleased	XBLA	XBO	
Sega Vintage Collection: Streets of Rage (Streets of Rage, 2, 3)	Classics	Sega/M2	Sega	May 30, 2012	Unreleased	Unreleased	Unreleased	XBLA	XBO	
Sega Vintage Collection: ToeJam & Earl (ToeJam & Earl, Panic on Funkotron)	Classics	Sega/M2	Sega	Nov 7, 2012	Unreleased	Unreleased	Unreleased	XBLA	XBO	
Self-Defense Training Camp		Ubisoft	Ubisoft	Nov 8, 2011	Nov 11, 2011	Unreleased	Nov 10, 2011	K		
Sensible World of Soccer (SWOS)	Sports & recreation	Kuju Entertainment	Codemasters	Dec 21, 2007	Unreleased	Unreleased	Unreleased	XBLA	XBO	
Serious Sam 3: BFE	Shooter	Croteam	Mastertronic Group	Oct 17, 2012	Unreleased	Unreleased	Unreleased	XBLA		
Serious Sam Double D XXL	Shooter	Mommy's Best Games	Mastertronic Group	Feb 20, 2013	Unreleased	Unreleased	Unreleased	XBLA		
Serious Sam HD: The First Encounter	Classics	Croteam	Majesco	Jan 13, 2010	Unreleased	Unreleased	Unreleased	XBLA		
Serious Sam HD: The Second Encounter	Classics	Croteam	Majesco	Sep 22, 2010	Unreleased	Unreleased	Unreleased	XBLA		
Sengoku Hime 2: Senran no Yo, Gunyuu Arashi no Gotoku	Strategy	SystemSoft	SystemSoft	Unreleased	Unreleased	Jun 24, 2010	Unreleased			
Sesame Street: Once Upon a Monster		Double Fine Productions	Warner Bros. Interactive Entertainment	Oct 11, 2011	Oct 14, 2011	Unreleased	Oct 12, 2011	K		
Shadow Assault: Tenchu	Action & adventure	From Software	From Software	Oct 8, 2008	Unreleased	Unreleased	Unreleased	XBLA	XBO	
Shadow Complex	Action & adventure	Chair Entertainment/ Epic Games	Microsoft Game Studios	Aug 19, 2009	Unreleased	Unreleased	Unreleased	XBLA	XBO	
Shadowrun	First-person shooter	FASA Interactive	Microsoft Game Studios	May 29, 2007	Jun 1, 2007	Jun 21, 2007	Nov 22, 2013		XBO	
Shadows of the Damned	Third-person shooter, action	Grasshopper Manufacture	Electronic Arts	Jun 21, 2011	Jun 24, 2011	Sep 22, 2011	Nov 22, 2013		XBO	
Shank	Action & adventure	Klei Entertainment	Electronic Arts	Aug 25, 2010	Unreleased	Unreleased	Unreleased	XBLA		
Shank 2	Action & adventure	Klei Entertainment	Electronic Arts	Feb 8, 2012	Unreleased	Unreleased	Unreleased	XBLA	XBO	
Sharin no Kuni: The Girl Among the Sunflowers	Visual novel	Akabeisoft2	5pb.	Unreleased	Unreleased	Oct 28, 2010	Unreleased			
Shaun White Skateboarding	Sports	Ubisoft Montreal	Ubisoft	Oct 1, 2010	Oct 1, 2010	Unreleased	Nov 22, 2013			
Shaun White Snowboarding	Sports	Ubisoft Montreal	Ubisoft	Nov 16, 2008	Nov 14, 2008	Unreleased	Nov 22, 2013			
Shellshock 2: Blood Trails	First-person shooter	Rebellion Developments	Eidos Interactive	Feb 24, 2009	Feb 13, 2009	Unreleased	Nov 22, 2013			
Sherlock Holmes vs. Jack the Ripper	Adventure	Frogwares	Focus Home Interactive	May 26, 2009	May 29, 2009	Jun 9, 2009	Nov 22, 2013			
Sherlock Holmes: Crimes & Punishments	Adventure	Frogwares	Focus Home Interactive	Sep 30, 2014	Oct 3, 2014	Sep 30, 2014	Nov 22, 2013			
Shiei no Sona-Nyl Refrain: What a Beautiful Memories	Visual novel	Liar Soft	Liar Soft	Unreleased	Unreleased	Feb 27, 2014	Unreleased			
Need for Speed: Shift 2 Unleashed	Racing	Slightly Mad Studios	Electronic Arts	Mar 8, 2011	Mar 10, 2011	Unreleased	Nov 22, 2013			
Shikigami no Shiro III	Shooter	Barnhouse Effect	Arc System Works	Unreleased	Unreleased	Dec 13, 2007	Unreleased			
Shin Sangokumusou 4 Special	Hack and slash, Tactical RPG	Omega Force	Koei	Unreleased	Unreleased	Dec 22, 2006	Nov 22, 2013			
Shinobi	Classics	Sega/ Backbone Entertainment	Sega	Jun 10, 2009	Unreleased	Unreleased	Unreleased	XBLA	XBO	
Shoot Many Robots	Action & adventure	Demiurge Studios	Ubisoft	Mar 14, 2012	Unreleased	Unreleased	Unreleased	XBLA		
Shooting Love, 10 Shuunen XIIzeal & Deltazeal	Shoot 'em up	Triangle Service	Triangle Service	Unreleased	Unreleased	Feb 19, 2009	Unreleased			
Shooting Love, 200X (Note: Trizeal Remix, a new version of Trizeal, and Exzeal combined into one game.)	Shoot 'em up	Triangle Service	Triangle Service	Unreleased	Unreleased	Feb 19, 2009	Nov 22, 2013			
Shotest Shogi	Puzzle & trivia	Rubicon Development	Microsoft Game Studios	Sep 10, 2008	Unreleased	Unreleased	Unreleased	XBLA	XBO	
Shred Nebula	Shooter	CrunchTime Games	Microsoft Game Studios	Sep 3, 2008	Unreleased	Unreleased	Unreleased	XBLA	XBO	
Shrek Forever After	Action-adventure	XPEC	Activision	May 18, 2010	Jun 18, 2010	Unreleased	Nov 22, 2013			
Shrek n' Roll	Family & educational	Backbone Entertainment	Activision	Nov 14, 2007	Unreleased	Unreleased	Unreleased	XBLA		
Shrek the Third	Action-adventure	7 Studios	Activision	May 15, 2007	Jun 22, 2007	Unreleased	Nov 22, 2013			
Silent Hill: Downpour	Survival horror	Vatra Games	Konami	May 13, 2012	May 30, 2012	Unreleased	Nov 22, 2013	3D	XBO	
Silent Hill: Homecoming	Survival horror	Konami	Konami	Sep 30, 2008	Feb 27, 2009	Unreleased	Nov 22, 2013		XBO	
Silent Hill HD Collection	Survival horror	Konami	Konami	Mar 20, 2012	Mar 29, 2012	Mar 29, 2012	Nov 22, 2013		XBO	
The Simpsons Arcade Game	Classics	Konami/ Backbone Entertainment	Konami	Feb 3, 2012	Unreleased	Unreleased	Unreleased	XBLA		
The Simpsons Game	Action, Platform	Electronic Arts	Electronic Arts	Oct 30, 2007	Nov 2, 2007	Unreleased	Nov 22, 2013			
The Sims 3	Sim	Maxis	Electronic Arts	Oct 26, 2010	Oct 28, 2010	Nov 18, 2010	Nov 22, 2013			
The Sims 3: Pets	Sim	Maxis, Edge of Reality	Electronic Arts	Oct 18, 2011	Oct 21, 2011	Oct 20, 2011	Nov 22, 2013	K		
Sine Mora	Shooter	Grasshopper Manufacture/ Digital Reality	Microsoft Studios	Mar 21, 2012	Unreleased	Unreleased	Unreleased	XBLA	XBO	
Singularity	First-person shooter	Raven Software	Activision	Jun 29, 2010	Jun 25, 2010	Unreleased	Nov 22, 2013			
Skate	Sports	EA Canada	Electronic Arts	Sep 14, 2007	Sep 28, 2007	Mar 13, 2008	Nov 22, 2013		XBO	
Skate 2	Sports	EA Canada	Electronic Arts	Jan 21, 2009	Jan 23, 2009	Jan 23, 2009	Nov 22, 2013			
Skate 3	Sports	EA Canada	Electronic Arts	May 11, 2010	May 14, 2010	Unreleased	Nov 22, 2013		XBO XE	
Ski Race	Sports	Rare	Microsoft Studios	Nov 20, 2012	Unreleased	Unreleased	Unreleased	K XBLA		
Ski-Doo: Snowmobile Challenge	Sports, Racing	Coldwood Interactive	Crave Entertainment	Mar 24, 2009	Mar 24, 2009	Unreleased	Nov 22, 2013			
Skullgirls/Skullgirls Encore	Fighting	Lab Zero Games	Autumn Games/Marvelous AQL	Apr 11, 2012	Unreleased	Unreleased	Unreleased	XBLA	XBO	
Skulls of the Shogun	Strategy & simulation	17-BIT	Microsoft Studios	Jan 30, 2013	Unreleased	Unreleased	Unreleased	XBLA		
Skydive: Proximity Flight	Sports & recreation	Gaijin Entertainment	TopWare Interactive	Mar 14, 2014	Unreleased	Unreleased	Unreleased	K XBLA	XBO	
SkyDrift	Action & adventure	Digital Reality	Bandai Namco Entertainment	Sep 7, 2011	Unreleased	Unreleased	Unreleased	XBLA		
Skylanders: Giants	Platformer	Toys for Bob	Activision	Oct 21, 2012	Oct 19, 2012	Unreleased	Nov 17, 2012			
Skylanders: Imaginators	Platformer	Toys for Bob	Activision	Oct 16, 2016	Oct 14, 2016	Unreleased	Oct 13, 2016			
Skylanders: Spyro's Adventure	Platformer	Toys for Bob	Activision	Oct 16, 2011	Oct 14, 2011	Unreleased	Oct 13, 2011			
Skylanders: SuperChargers	Platformer	Beenox	Activision	Sep 20, 2015	Sep 25, 2015	Unreleased	Sep 24, 2015			
Skylanders: Swap Force	Platformer	Vicarious Visions	Activision	Oct 13, 2013	Oct 18, 2013	Unreleased	Oct 16, 2013			
Skylanders: Trap Team	Platformer	Vicarious Visions	Activision	Oct 5, 2014	Oct 10, 2014	Unreleased	Oct 2, 2014			
Sleeping Dogs	Action, Open World	United Front Games	Square Enix	Aug 14, 2012	Aug 17, 2012	Unreleased	Nov 22, 2013			
Slender: The Arrival	Action & adventure	Blue Isle Studios	Midnight City	Sep 24, 2014	Unreleased	Unreleased	Unreleased	XBLA	XBO	
Small Arms	Action & adventure	Gastronaut Studios	Microsoft Game Studios	Nov 22, 2006	Unreleased	Unreleased	Unreleased	XBLA	XBO	
Smash Court Tennis 3	Sports	Namco Bandai Games	Namco Bandai Games	Aug 19, 2008	Aug 29, 2008	Dec 13, 2007	Nov 22, 2013			
Smash TV	Classics	Midway Games/ Digital Eclipse	Midway Games	Nov 22, 2005	Unreleased	Unreleased	Unreleased	XBLA		
The Smurfs 2	Platformer	WayForward Technologies	Ubisoft	Jul 23, 2013	Jul 19, 2013	Unreleased	Nov 22, 2013			
Sneak King	Stealth, action	Blitz Games	King Games	Nov 19, 2006	Unreleased	Unreleased	Unreleased			
Sniper Elite III	Tactical shooter, stealth	Rebellion Developments	505 Games	Jul 1, 2014	Jun 27, 2014	Unreleased	Nov 22, 2013			
Sniper Elite V2	Tactical shooter, stealth	Rebellion Developments	505 Games	May 2, 2012	May 4, 2013	Unreleased	Nov 22, 2013		XBO	
Sniper: Ghost Warrior	First-person shooter	City Interactive	City Interactive	Jun 29, 2010	Jun 24, 2010	Unreleased	Nov 22, 2013			
Sniper: Ghost Warrior 2	First-person shooter	City Interactive	City Interactive	Mar 12, 2013	Mar 15, 2013	Unreleased	Nov 22, 2013			
Snipers	First-person shooter	Hydravision	Bigben Interactive	Feb 24, 2012	Feb 24, 2012	Unreleased	Unreleased			
Snoopy Flying Ace	Shooter	Smart Bomb Interactive	Microsoft Game Studios	Jun 2, 2010	Unreleased	Unreleased	Unreleased	XBLA		
Soldier of Fortune: Payback	First-person shooter	Activision	Activision	Nov 13, 2007	Dec 7, 2007	Unreleased	Nov 22, 2013			
Soltrio Solitaire	Card & board	Silver Creek Entertainment	Microsoft Game Studios	May 16, 2007	Unreleased	Unreleased	Unreleased	XBLA	XBO	
Sonic & All-Stars Racing Transformed	Racing	Sumo Digital	Sega	Nov 20, 2012	Nov 16, 2012	Nov 22, 2012	Nov 22, 2013		XBO	
Sonic & Knuckles	Classics, stand-alone expansion	Sonic Team/ Backbone Entertainment	Sega	Sep 9, 2009	Unreleased	Unreleased	Unreleased	XBLA	XBO	
Sonic & Sega All-Stars Racing	Racing	Sumo Digital	Sega	Feb 23, 2010	Feb 26, 2010	Feb 25, 2010	Nov 22, 2013			
Sonic Adventure	Classics	Sonic Team	Sega	Sep 15, 2010	Unreleased	Unreleased	Unreleased	XBLA	XBO	
Sonic Adventure 2	Classics	Sonic Team	Sega	Oct 5, 2012	Unreleased	Unreleased	Unreleased	XBLA	XBO	
Sonic Free Riders		Sonic Team	Sega	Nov 4, 2010	Nov 10, 2010	Nov 18, 2010	Nov 20, 2010	K		
Sonic Generations	Platform, action-adventure	Sonic Team	Sega	Nov 1, 2011	Nov 3, 2011	Dec 1, 2011	Nov 22, 2013	3D	XBO XE	
Sonic the Fighters	Fighting	Sega AM2	Sega	Nov 28, 2012	Unreleased	Unreleased	Unreleased	XBLA	XBO	
Sonic the Hedgehog	Classics	Sonic Team	Sega	Jul 11, 2007	Unreleased	Unreleased	Unreleased	XBLA	XBO	
Sonic the Hedgehog	Platform	Sonic Team	Sega	Nov 14, 2006	Nov 24, 2006	Dec 21, 2006	Nov 24, 2006			
Sonic the Hedgehog 2	Classics	Sonic Team	Sega	Sep 12, 2007	Unreleased	Unreleased	Unreleased	XBLA	XBO	
Sonic CD	Classics	Sonic Team/ Christian Whitehead	Sega	Dec 14, 2011	Unreleased	Unreleased	Unreleased	XBLA	XBO	
Sonic the Hedgehog 3	Classics	Sonic Team/ Backbone Entertainment	Sega	Jun 10, 2009	Unreleased	Unreleased	Unreleased	XBLA	XBO	
Sonic the Hedgehog 4: Episode I	Platformer	Sonic Team/Dimps	Sega	Oct 13, 2010	Unreleased	Unreleased	Unreleased	XBLA	XBO	
Sonic the Hedgehog 4: Episode II	Platformer	Sonic Team/Dimps	Sega	May 16, 2012	Unreleased	Unreleased	Unreleased	XBLA	XBO	
Sonic Unleashed (Note: Known as Sonic World Adventure in Japan.)	Platform, action	Sonic Team	Sega	Nov 18, 2008	Nov 28, 2008	Feb 19, 2009	Nov 22, 2013		XBO	
Sonic's Ultimate Genesis Collection (Note: SEGA Mega Drive Ultimate Collection everywhere but North America.)	Compilation	Backbone Entertainment	Sega	Feb 10, 2009	Feb 26, 2009	Unreleased	Nov 22, 2013			
Soulcalibur	Action & adventure	Bandai Namco Entertainment	Bandai Namco Entertainment	Jul 2, 2008	Unreleased	Unreleased	Unreleased	XBLA	XBO	
Soulcalibur II HD Online	Fighting	Namco	Bandai Namco Entertainment	Nov 20, 2013	Unreleased	Unreleased	Unreleased	XBLA	XBO	
Soulcalibur IV	Fighting	Namco Bandai Games	Namco Bandai Games	Jul 29, 2008	Jul 31, 2008	Jul 31, 2008	Nov 22, 2013			
Soulcalibur V	Fighting	Namco Bandai Games	Namco Bandai Games	Jan 31, 2012	Feb 3, 2012	Jan 31, 2012	Nov 22, 2013			
South Park Let's Go Tower Defense Play!	Strategy & simulation	Doublesix	Microsoft Game Studios	Oct 7, 2009	Unreleased	Unreleased	Unreleased	XBLA		
South Park: Tenorman's Revenge	Action & adventure	Other Ocean Interactive	Microsoft Studios	Mar 30, 2012	Unreleased	Unreleased	Unreleased	XBLA		
South Park: The Stick of Truth	RPG	Obsidian Entertainment	Ubisoft	Mar 4, 2014	Mar 7, 2014	Mar 6, 2014	Nov 22, 2013		XBO	
Space Ark	Family & educational	Strawdog Studios	Microsoft Game Studios	Jun 16, 2010	Unreleased	Unreleased	Unreleased	XBLA	XBO	
Space Channel 5: Part 2	Classics	United Game Artists	Sega	Oct 5, 2011	Unreleased	Unreleased	Unreleased	XBLA		
Space Chimps	Platform, Adventure	Redtribe	Brash Entertainment	Jul 15, 2008	Aug 1, 2008	Unreleased	Nov 22, 2013			
Space Giraffe	Action & adventure	Llamasoft	Microsoft Game Studios	Aug 22, 2007	Unreleased	Unreleased	Unreleased	XBLA	XBO	
Space Invaders Extreme	Shooter	Backbone Entertainment	Taito	May 6, 2009	Unreleased	Unreleased	Unreleased	XBLA		
Space Invaders Infinity Gene	Shooter	Taito	Square Enix	Sep 15, 2010	Unreleased	Unreleased	Unreleased	XBLA	XBO	
Spare Parts	Action & adventure	EA Bright Light	Electronic Arts	Jan 19, 2011	Unreleased	Unreleased	Unreleased	XBLA		
Spartacus Legends	Fighting	Kung Fu Factory	Ubisoft	Jun 26, 2013	Unreleased	Unreleased	Unreleased	XBLA		
Spec Ops: The Line	Third-person shooter, Tactical shooter	Yager	2K Games	Jun 26, 2012	Jun 29, 2012	Unreleased	Nov 22, 2013		XBO	
Special Forces: Team X (STX)	Shooter	Zombie Studios	Atari	Feb 6, 2013	Unreleased	Unreleased	Unreleased	XBLA		
Spectral Force 3: Innocent Rage	Tactical RPG	Idea Factory	Idea Factory	Jul 29, 2008	Jul 29, 2008	Aug 11, 2006	Nov 22, 2013			
Speedball 2: Brutal Deluxe	Classics	The Bitmap Brothers/ Empire Interactive	Empire Interactive	Oct 17, 2007	Unreleased	Unreleased	Unreleased	XBLA		
Spelunky	Action & adventure	Mossmouth	Microsoft Studios	Jul 4, 2012	Unreleased	Unreleased	Unreleased	XBLA	XBO	
Spider-Man 3	Action, Open World	Treyarch	Activision	May 4, 2007	May 4, 2007	Unreleased	Nov 22, 2013			
Spider-Man: Edge of Time	Action-adventure	Beenox	Activision	Oct 4, 2011	Oct 14, 2011	Unreleased	Nov 22, 2013			
Spider-Man: Friend or Foe	Action-adventure, beat 'em up	Next Level Games	Activision	Oct 2, 2007	Oct 12, 2007	Unreleased	Nov 22, 2013			
Spider-Man: Shattered Dimensions	Action-adventure, Platform, stealth	Beenox	Activision	Sep 7, 2010	Sep 10, 2010	Unreleased	Nov 22, 2013			
Spider-Man: Web of Shadows	Action-adventure, beat 'em up, Platform	Shaba Games	Activision	Oct 21, 2008	Oct 24, 2008	Unreleased	Nov 22, 2013			
The Spiderwick Chronicles	Action-adventure	Sierra Entertainment	Sierra Entertainment	Feb 5, 2008	Mar 28, 2008	Unreleased	Nov 22, 2013			
Splatterhouse	Beat 'em up, survival horror	Bottlerocket Entertainment	Namco Bandai Games	Nov 23, 2010	Nov 26, 2010	Unreleased	Nov 22, 2013			
The Splatters	Puzzle & trivia	SpikySnail Games	Microsoft Studios	Apr 11, 2012	Unreleased	Unreleased	Unreleased	XBLA	XBO	
Split/Second	Racing	Black Rock Studio	Disney Interactive Studios	May 18, 2010	May 21, 2010	Unreleased	Nov 22, 2013		XBO	
'Splosion Man	Platformer	Twisted Pixel Games	Microsoft Game Studios	Jul 22, 2009	Unreleased	Unreleased	Unreleased	XBLA	XBO	
SpongeBob's Surf & Skate Roadtrip		THQ	THQ	Nov 8, 2011	Nov 11, 2011	Unreleased	Nov 10, 2011	K		
SpongeBob's Truth or Square	Action	Heavy Iron Studios	THQ	Oct 26, 2009	Sep 17, 2010	Unreleased	Unreleased			
SpongeBob HeroPants	Action-adventure, Platformer	Behaviour Interactive	Activision	Feb 3, 2015	Mar 26, 2015	Unreleased	Unreleased			
SpongeBob SquarePants: Plankton's Robotic Revenge	Action-adventure, Platformer, Third-person shooter	Behaviour Interactive	Activision	Oct 22, 2013	Oct 11, 2013	Unreleased	Oct 23, 2013			
SpongeBob SquarePants: Underpants Slam	Family & educational	Blitz Arcade	THQ	Dec 26, 2007	Unreleased	Unreleased	Unreleased	XBLA		
Spyglass Board Games	Card & board	Strange Flavour/Freeverse	Microsoft Game Studios	Aug 1, 2007	Unreleased	Unreleased	Unreleased	XBLA		
SSX (Note: working title SSX:Deadly Descents)	Sports	EA Canada	Electronic Arts	Feb 28, 2012	Mar 2, 2012	Mar 15, 2012	Nov 22, 2013		XBO	
Stacking	Role playing	Double Fine Productions	THQ	Feb 9, 2011	Unreleased	Unreleased	Unreleased	XBLA	XBO	
Star Ocean: The Last Hope	Action RPG	tri-Ace	Square Enix	Feb 23, 2009	Jun 5, 2009	Feb 19, 2009	Nov 22, 2013		XBO	
Star Raiders	Action & adventure	Incinerator Studios	Atari	May 11, 2011	Unreleased	Unreleased	Unreleased	XBLA		
Star Trek	Action	Digital Extremes	Namco Bandai Games, Paramount Digital Entertainment	Apr 23, 2013	Apr 26, 2013	Unreleased	Nov 22, 2013			
Star Trek DAC	Shooter	Naked Sky Entertainment	Paramount Digital Entertainment	May 13, 2009	Unreleased	Unreleased	Unreleased	XBLA		
Star Trek: Legacy	RTS, action-adventure	Mad Doc Software	Bethesda Softworks	Dec 14, 2006	Dec 22, 2006	Unreleased	Dec 15, 2006			
Star Wars Pinball: Heroes Within	Pinball, DLC	Zen Studios	Zen Studios	Apr 29, 2014	Unreleased	Unreleased	Unreleased	XBLA		
Star Wars Pinball: The Force Awakens	Pinball, DLC	Zen Studios	Zen Studios	Jan 12, 2016	Unreleased	Unreleased	Unreleased	XBLA		
Star Wars: The Clone Wars – Republic Heroes	Action-adventure	Krome Studios	LucasArts	Oct 6, 2009	Oct 6, 2009	Unreleased	Nov 22, 2013			
Star Wars: The Force Unleashed	Hack and slash	LucasArts	LucasArts	Sep 16, 2008	Sep 19, 2008	Unreleased	Nov 22, 2013		XBO XE	
Star Wars: The Force Unleashed II	Action	LucasArts	LucasArts	Oct 26, 2010	Dec 31, 2010	Unreleased	Nov 22, 2013		XBO	
State of Decay	Action & adventure	Undead Labs	Microsoft Studios	Jun 5, 2013	Unreleased	Unreleased	Unreleased	XBLA		
Steel Battalion: Heavy Armor		From Software	Capcom	Jun 19, 2012	Jun 22, 2012	Jun 28, 2012	Jun 21, 2012	K		
Steins;Gate	Visual novel	5pb., Nitroplus	5pb.	Unreleased	Unreleased	Oct 15, 2009	Nov 22, 2013			
Steins;Gate: Hiyoku Renri no Darling	Visual novel	5pb., Nitroplus	5pb.	Unreleased	Unreleased	Jun 16, 2011	Nov 22, 2013			
Steins;Gate: Linear Bounded Phenogram	Visual novel	5pb.	5pb.	Unreleased	Unreleased	Apr 25, 2013	Unreleased			
Stoked	Sports	Bongfish	Destineer	Jan 20, 2009	Oct 2, 2009	Unreleased	Nov 22, 2013			
Stoked: Big Air Edition	Sports	Bongfish	Destineer	Nov 23, 2009	Mar 11, 2011	Jan 13, 2011	Jun 2, 2011			
Storm	Puzzle & trivia	IndiePub	Bandai Namco Entertainment	Jun 14, 2013	Unreleased	Unreleased	Unreleased	XBLA		
Stormrise	RTT	The Creative Assembly	Sega	Mar 24, 2009	Mar 27, 2009	Unreleased	Nov 22, 2013			
Stranglehold	Third-person shooter, action	Midway Games	Midway Games, Success ^{JP}	Sep 5, 2007	Sep 14, 2007	May 22, 2008	Nov 22, 2013			
Strania	Shooter	G.rev	G.rev	Mar 30, 2011	Unreleased	Unreleased	Unreleased	XBLA	XBO	
Street Fighter II: Hyper Fighting	Classics	Capcom/ Sensory Sweep Studios	Capcom	Aug 2, 2006	Unreleased	Unreleased	Unreleased	XBLA		
Street Fighter III: 3rd Strike Online Edition	Classics	Capcom/ Iron Galaxy	Capcom	Aug 24, 2011	Unreleased	Unreleased	Unreleased	XBLA		
Street Fighter IV	Fighting	Dimps	Capcom	Feb 17, 2009	Feb 20, 2009	Feb 12, 2009	Nov 22, 2013		XBO	
Street Fighter X Tekken	Fighting	Capcom	Capcom	Mar 6, 2012	Mar 9, 2012	Mar 8, 2012	Nov 22, 2013			
Street Trace NYC	Racing & flying	Gaia Industries	Microsoft Game Studios	Aug 22, 2007	Unreleased	Unreleased	Unreleased	XBLA		
Streets of Rage 2	Classics	Sega/Digital Eclipse	Sega	Aug 29, 2007	Unreleased	Unreleased	Unreleased	XBLA		
Strider	Action & adventure	Double Helix Games	Capcom	Feb 19, 2014	Unreleased	Unreleased	Unreleased	XBLA		
Strike Witches: Shirogane no Tsubasa	Shooter, Visual novel	CyberFront	CyberFront	Unreleased	Unreleased	Jul 29, 2010	Nov 22, 2013			
Stuntman: Ignition	Racing, action	Paradigm Entertainment	THQ	Aug 28, 2007	Aug 31, 2007	Dec 13, 2007	Nov 22, 2013		XBO	
Summer Athletics 2009	Sports	49 Games	dtp entertainment	Unreleased	Unreleased	Unreleased	Nov 22, 2013			
Summer Athletics: The Ultimate Challenge	Sports	49 Games	dtp entertainment	Jul 29, 2008	Aug 15, 2008	Unreleased	Nov 22, 2013			
Summer Challenge: Athletics Tournament	Sports	Sproing Interactive Media	RTL Entertainment	Mar 18, 2012	Feb 14, 2012	Unreleased	Unreleased			
Summer Stars 2012	Sports	49 Games	Deep Silver	Unreleased	Jun 1, 2012	Unreleased	Unreleased	K		
Super Contra	Classics	Konami/Digital Eclipse	Konami	Jul 25, 2007	Unreleased	Unreleased	Unreleased	XBLA	XBO	
Super Meat Boy	Platformer	Team Meat	Microsoft Game Studios	Oct 20, 2010	Unreleased	Unreleased	Unreleased	XBLA	XBO	
Super Puzzle Fighter II Turbo HD Remix	Puzzle & trivia	Backbone Entertainment	Capcom	Aug 29, 2007	Unreleased	Unreleased	Unreleased	XBLA	XBO	
Super Robot Wars XO	Tactical RPG	Namco Bandai Games	Namco Bandai Games	Unreleased	Unreleased	Nov 30, 2006	Nov 22, 2013			
Superstar Karaoke	Rhythm	Studio9	Studio9	Unreleased	Unreleased	Mar 7, 2008	Unreleased			
Super Street Fighter II Turbo HD Remix	Classics	Backbone Entertainment	Capcom	Nov 26, 2008	Unreleased	Unreleased	Unreleased	XBLA		
Super Street Fighter IV	Fighting, update	Dimps	Capcom	Apr 27, 2010	Apr 30, 2010	Apr 28, 2010	Nov 22, 2013			
Super Street Fighter IV: Arcade Edition	Fighting, update	Dimps, Capcom	Capcom	Jun 7, 2011	Jun 7, 2011	Jun 7, 2011	Jun 7, 2011		XBO	
Superman Returns	Action	EA Tiburon	Electronic Arts	Nov 20, 2006	Nov 24, 2006	Unreleased	Nov 30, 2006			
Super Time Force	Shooter	Capybara Games	Microsoft Studios	May 14, 2014	Unreleased	Unreleased	Unreleased	XBLA		
Superstars V8 Racing	Racing	Milestone	Black Bean Games	Unreleased	Unreleased	Unreleased	Nov 22, 2013			
Superstars V8 Next Challenge	Racing	Milestone	Black Bean Games	Unreleased	Unreleased	Unreleased	Nov 22, 2013			
Supremacy MMA	Sports	Kung Fu Factory	505 Games	Sep 20, 2011	Sep 23, 2011	Unreleased	Nov 22, 2013			
Supreme Commander	RTS	Hellbent Games	Aspyr	Jun 23, 2008	Sep 12, 2008	Unreleased	Nov 22, 2013			
Supreme Commander 2	RTS	Gas Powered Games	Square Enix	Mar 16, 2010	Mar 19, 2010	Unreleased	Nov 22, 2013		XBO	
Surf's Up	Sports	Ubisoft	Ubisoft	May 29, 2007	Aug 3, 2007	Unreleased	Nov 22, 2013			
Swarm	Platformer	Hothead Games	Ignition Entertainment	Mar 23, 2011	Unreleased	Unreleased	Unreleased	XBLA		
Switchball	Action & adventure	Atomic Elbow	Activision	Nov 7, 2007	Unreleased	Unreleased	Unreleased	XBLA		
Syberia	Action & adventure	Microïds	Bandai Namco Entertainment	Dec 3, 2014	Unreleased	Unreleased	Unreleased	XBLA	XBO	
Syberia II	Action & adventure	Microïds	Bandai Namco Entertainment	May 13, 2015	Unreleased	Unreleased	Unreleased	XBLA		
Syndicate	First-person shooter	Starbreeze Studios	Electronic Arts	Feb 21, 2012	Feb 24, 2012	Unreleased	Nov 22, 2013		XBO	
Takedown: Red Sabre	Shooter	Serellan	505 Games	Feb 21, 2014	Unreleased	Unreleased	Unreleased	XBLA		
Tales from Space: Mutant Blobs Attack	Platformer	DrinkBox Studios	Midnight City	Jun 18, 2014	Unreleased	Unreleased	Unreleased	XBLA	XBO	
Tales from the Borderlands	Action & adventure	Telltale Games	Telltale Games	Nov 26, 2014	Unreleased	Unreleased	Unreleased	XBLA		
Tales of Vesperia	RPG	Namco Tales Studio	Namco Bandai Games	Aug 26, 2008	Jun 26, 2009	Aug 7, 2008	Nov 22, 2013			
Tayutama: Kiss on my Deity	Visual novel	5pb.	5pb.	Unreleased	Unreleased	Nov 5, 2011	Unreleased			
Tecmo Bowl Throwback	Sports & recreation	Southend Interactive	Koei Tecmo	Apr 29, 2010	Unreleased	Unreleased	Unreleased	XBLA	XBO	
Teenage Mutant Ninja Turtles	Beat 'em up	Magic Pockets	Activision	Oct 22, 2013	Oct 25, 2013	Unreleased	Nov 22, 2013			
Teenage Mutant Ninja Turtles	Classics	Ubisoft/Digital Eclipse	Ubisoft	Mar 14, 2007	Unreleased	Unreleased	Unreleased	XBLA		
Teenage Mutant Ninja Turtles: Danger of the Ooze	Beat 'em up	WayForward Technologies	Activision	Oct 28, 2014	Nov 1, 2014	Unreleased	Nov 22, 2013			
Teenage Mutant Ninja Turtles: Mutants in Manhattan	Action & adventure	PlatinumGames	Activision	May 24, 2016	May 27, 2016	Unreleased	May 24, 2016			
Teenage Mutant Ninja Turtles: Out of the Shadows	Action & adventure	Red Fly Studio	Activision	Aug 28, 2013	Unreleased	Unreleased	Unreleased	XBLA		
Teenage Mutant Ninja Turtles: Training Lair	Kinect	Float Hybrid Entertainment	Microsoft Studios	Jul 23, 2014	Unreleased	Unreleased	Unreleased	K XBLA		
Teenage Mutant Ninja Turtles: Turtles in Time Re-Shelled	Classics	Ubisoft Singapore	Ubisoft	Aug 5, 2009	Unreleased	Unreleased	Unreleased	XBLA		
Tekken 6	Fighting, beat 'em up	Namco Bandai Games	Namco Bandai Games	Oct 27, 2009	Oct 30, 2009	Oct 29, 2009	Nov 22, 2013		XBO	
Tekken Tag Tournament 2	Fighting, beat 'em up	Namco Bandai Games	Namco Bandai Games	Sep 11, 2012	Oct 30, 2012	Oct 29, 2012	Nov 22, 2013	3D	XBO	
Tempest	Classics	Stainless Games/Atari	Atari	Dec 19, 2007	Unreleased	Unreleased	Unreleased	XBLA		
Tenchu Z (Note: Known as Tenchu Senran in Japan.)	Stealth	K2 Interactive	Microsoft Game Studios	Jun 12, 2007	Jun 29, 2007	Oct 5, 2006	Nov 22, 2013			
Tengai Makyou Ziria: Haruka naru Jipang	RPG	Hudson Soft	Hudson Soft	Unreleased	Unreleased	Mar 23, 2006	Nov 22, 2013			
Terminator Salvation	Third-person shooter	GRIN Studios	Equity, Evolved Games	May 19, 2009	May 29, 2009	Unreleased	Nov 22, 2013			
Terraria - Xbox 360 Edition (Note: Has a physical release as Terraria: Collector's Edition)	Action & adventure	Re-Logic	505 Games	Mar 27, 2013	Unreleased	Unreleased	Unreleased	XBLA		
The Testament of Sherlock Holmes	Action-RPG	Frogwares	Focus Home Interactive	Sep 25, 2012	Sep 20, 2012	Unreleased	Nov 22, 2012			
Test Drive Unlimited	Racing	Eden Games	Atari	Sep 5, 2006	Sep 8, 2006	Apr 26, 2007	Sep 21, 2006			
Test Drive Unlimited 2	Racing, Open World	Eden Games	Atari	Feb 8, 2011	Feb 11, 2011	Jun 30, 2011	Nov 22, 2013			
Test Drive: Ferrari Racing Legends	Racing	Evolved Games, Slightly Mad Studios	Atari	Jul 3, 2012	Aug 15, 2012	Unreleased	Nov 22, 2013			
Tetris: The Grand Master Ace	Puzzle	Arika	AQ Interactive	Unreleased	Unreleased	Dec 10, 2005	Unreleased			
Tetris Evolution	Puzzle	Mass Media	THQ	Mar 19, 2007	Apr 27, 2007	Unreleased	Nov 22, 2013			
Tetris Splash	Puzzle & trivia	Tetris Online	Microsoft Game Studios	Oct 3, 2007	Unreleased	Unreleased	Unreleased	XBLA		
Texas Cheat 'em	Card & board	Wideload Games	D3 Publisher	May 13, 2009	Unreleased	Unreleased	Unreleased	XBLA		
Texas Hold 'em	Card & board	TikGames	Microsoft Game Studios	Aug 23, 2006	Unreleased	Unreleased	Unreleased	XBLA	XBO	
Thief	action-adventure, stealth	Eidos Montréal	Square Enix	Feb 25, 2014	Feb 28, 2014	Feb 27, 2014	Nov 22, 2013			
Things on Wheels	Racing & flying	Load	Focus Home Interactive	May 12, 2010	Unreleased	Unreleased	Unreleased	XBLA		
Thor: God of Thunder	Action	Liquid Entertainment	Sega	May 3, 2011	Apr 30, 2011	Unreleased	Nov 22, 2013			
Thrillville: Off the Rails	RTS, Sim, Party	Frontier Developments	LucasArts	Oct 16, 2007	Oct 19, 2007	Unreleased	Nov 22, 2013			
Thunder Wolves	Shooter	Most Wanted Entertainment	bitComposer Interactive	Jun 12, 2013	Unreleased	Unreleased	Unreleased	XBLA		
Ticket to Ride	Card & board	Next Level Games	Microsoft Game Studios	Jun 25, 2008	Unreleased	Unreleased	Unreleased	XBLA	XBO	
Tiger Woods PGA Tour 06	Sports	EA Tiburon	EA Sports	Nov 22, 2005	Dec 2, 2005	Feb 23, 2006	Mar 23, 2006			
Tiger Woods PGA Tour 07	Sports	EA Tiburon	EA Sports	Oct 17, 2006	Oct 27, 2006	Unreleased	Nov 22, 2013			
Tiger Woods PGA Tour 08	Sports	EA Tiburon	EA Sports	Aug 28, 2007	Aug 31, 2007	Unreleased	Nov 22, 2013			
Tiger Woods PGA Tour 09	Sports	EA Tiburon	EA Sports	Aug 26, 2008	Aug 29, 2008	Sep 25, 2008	Nov 22, 2013			
Tiger Woods PGA Tour 10	Sports	EA Tiburon	EA Sports	Jun 8, 2009	Jul 3, 2009	Unreleased	Nov 22, 2013			
Tiger Woods PGA Tour 11	Sports	EA Tiburon	EA Sports	Jun 8, 2010	Jul 2, 2010	Unreleased	Nov 22, 2013			
Tiger Woods PGA Tour 12: The Masters	Sports	EA Tiburon	EA Sports	Mar 29, 2011	Apr 1, 2011	Unreleased	Nov 22, 2013			
Tiger Woods PGA Tour 13	Sports	EA Tiburon	EA Sports	Mar 27, 2012	Mar 30, 2012	Unreleased	Nov 22, 2013	K		
Tiger Woods PGA Tour 14	Sports	EA Tiburon	EA Sports	Mar 26, 2013	Mar 28, 2013	Unreleased	Nov 22, 2013	K		
Time Leap	Visual novel, Adult	Front Wing	Prototype	Unreleased	Jun 25, 2009	Jun 25, 2009	Nov 22, 2013			
Time Pilot	Classics	Konami/Digital Eclipse	Konami	Aug 30, 2006	Unreleased	Unreleased	Unreleased	XBLA		
TimeShift	First-person shooter	Saber Interactive	Vivendi Games	Oct 30, 2007	Nov 2, 2007	Unreleased	Nov 1, 2007		XBO	
TiQal	Puzzle & trivia	Slapdash Games	Microsoft Game Studios	Mar 26, 2008	Unreleased	Unreleased	Unreleased	XBLA		
Titanfall	First-person shooter, Mecha	Respawn Entertainment	Electronic Arts	Mar 25, 2014	Apr 8, 2014	Mar 28, 2014	Nov 22, 2013			
TMNT	Action-adventure	Ubisoft Quebec	Ubisoft	Mar 20, 2007	Mar 23, 2007	Unreleased	Nov 22, 2013			
TNA iMPACT!	Fighting, Sports	Midway Studios – Los Angeles	Midway Games	Sep 9, 2008	Sep 12, 2008	Unreleased	Nov 22, 2013			
TNT Racers	Racing & flying	Keen Games	dtp entertainment	Feb 9, 2011	Unreleased	Unreleased	Unreleased	XBLA		
Tom Clancy's EndWar	RTT	Ubisoft Shanghai	Ubisoft	Nov 4, 2008	Nov 7, 2008	Jan 29, 2009	Nov 22, 2013		XBO	
Tom Clancy's Ghost Recon Advanced Warfighter	Tactical shooter	Red Storm Entertainment	Ubisoft	Mar 9, 2006	Mar 10, 2006	Jun 29, 2006	Nov 22, 2013		XBO	
Tom Clancy's Ghost Recon Advanced Warfighter 2	Tactical shooter	Red Storm Entertainment	Ubisoft	Mar 6, 2007	Mar 9, 2007	Jul 12, 2007	Nov 22, 2013		XBO	
Tom Clancy's Ghost Recon: Future Soldier	Tactical shooter	Red Storm Entertainment	Ubisoft	May 22, 2012	May 24, 2012	Jul 4, 2012	Nov 22, 2013	3D K	XBO	
Tom Clancy's H.A.W.X	Combat Flight Simulator	Ubisoft Bucharest	Ubisoft	Mar 5, 2009	Mar 6, 2009	Apr 23, 2009	Nov 22, 2013		XBO	
Tom Clancy's H.A.W.X 2	Combat Flight Simulator	Ubisoft Bucharest	Ubisoft	Sep 7, 2010	Sep 3, 2010	Oct 7, 2010	Nov 22, 2013			
Tom Clancy's Rainbow Six: Vegas	First-person shooter, Tactical shooter	Ubisoft Montreal	Ubisoft	Nov 20, 2006	Dec 1, 2006	Apr 26, 2007	Nov 22, 2013		XBO	
Tom Clancy's Rainbow Six: Vegas 2	First-person shooter, Tactical shooter	Ubisoft Montreal	Ubisoft	Mar 18, 2008	Mar 20, 2008	Apr 24, 2008	Nov 22, 2013		XBO	
Tom Clancy's Splinter Cell: Blacklist	Action-adventure, stealth	Ubisoft Toronto	Ubisoft	Aug 20, 2013	Aug 20, 2013	Aug 23, 2013	Nov 22, 2013	K	XBO XE	
Tom Clancy's Splinter Cell: Conviction	Action-adventure, stealth	Ubisoft Montreal	Ubisoft	Apr 13, 2010	Apr 16, 2010	Apr 28, 2010	Nov 22, 2013		XBO XE	
Tom Clancy's Splinter Cell: Double Agent	Action-adventure, stealth	Ubisoft Shanghai	Ubisoft	Oct 17, 2006	Oct 20, 2006	Feb 22, 2007	Nov 22, 2013		XBO XE	
Tomb Raider	Action-adventure, Platform	Crystal Dynamics	Square Enix	Mar 5, 2013	Mar 5, 2013	Mar 5, 2013	Nov 22, 2013			
Tomb Raider: Anniversary (Note: The retail disc runs independently. The episodic version requires Tomb Raider: Legend.)	Action-adventure, Platform	Crystal Dynamics	Eidos Interactive	Oct 23, 2007	Oct 26, 2007	Mar 27, 2008	Nov 22, 2013		XBO	
Tomb Raider: Legend	Action-adventure, Platform	Crystal Dynamics	Eidos Interactive	Apr 11, 2006	Apr 7, 2006	Oct 5, 2006	Nov 22, 2013		XBO	
Tomb Raider: Underworld	Action-adventure, Platform	Crystal Dynamics	Eidos Interactive	Nov 18, 2008	Nov 21, 2008	Jan 29, 2009	Nov 22, 2013		XBO	
Tomoyo After: It's a Wonderful Life CS Edition	Visual novel, Adult	Key	Prototype	Unreleased	Unreleased	Oct 22, 2010	Nov 22, 2013			
Tony Hawk: Ride	Sports	Robomodo	Activision	Nov 17, 2009	Nov 20, 2009	Unreleased	Nov 22, 2013			
Tony Hawk: Shred	Sports	Robomodo	Activision	Oct 26, 2010	Oct 29, 2010	Unreleased	Nov 22, 2013			
Tony Hawk's American Wasteland	Sports	Neversoft	Activision	Nov 22, 2005	Dec 2, 2005	Unreleased	Mar 23, 2006			
Tony Hawk's Pro Skater 5	Sports	Robomodo	Activision	Dec 15, 2015	Dec 15, 2015	Unreleased	Nov 22, 2013			
Tony Hawk's Pro Skater HD	Sports & recreation	Robomodo	Activision	Jul 18, 2012	Unreleased	Unreleased	Unreleased	XBLA		
Tony Hawk's Project 8	Sports	Neversoft	Activision, Spike ^{JP}	Nov 7, 2006	Nov 17, 2006	Nov 29, 2006	Nov 22, 2013			
Tony Hawk's Proving Ground	Sports	Neversoft	Activision	Oct 15, 2007	Nov 2, 2007	Unreleased	Nov 22, 2013			
Too Human	Action RPG	Silicon Knights	Microsoft Game Studios	Aug 19, 2008	Aug 29, 2008	Aug 28, 2008	Nov 22, 2013		XBO	
Top Gun: Hard Lock	Sports, Combat flight simulator	Headstrong Games	505 Games	Mar 6, 2012	Mar 6, 2012	Unreleased	Nov 22, 2013			
Top Hand Rodeo Tour		D3 Publisher	D3 Publisher	Aug 20, 2012	Aug 23, 2012	Aug 22, 2012	Unreleased	K		
Top Spin 2	Sports	Indie Built	2K Sports	Mar 29, 2006	Apr 7, 2006	Aug 13, 2006	Nov 22, 2013			
Top Spin 3	Sports	PAM Development	2K Sports	Jun 23, 2008	Jun 20, 2008	Jul 30, 2009	Nov 22, 2013			
Top Spin 4	Sports	2K Czech	2K Sports	Mar 15, 2011	Mar 18, 2011	Mar 30, 2011	Nov 22, 2013			
Torchlight	Role playing	Runic Games	Microsoft Studios	Mar 9, 2011	Unreleased	Unreleased	Unreleased	XBLA	XBO	
Tornado Outbreak (Note: Formerly known as Zephyr: Rise of the Elementals.)	Action	Loose Cannon Studios	Konami	Sep 15, 2009	Sep 15, 2009	Unreleased	Nov 22, 2013			
TotemBall	Action & adventure	Strange Flavour/Freeverse	Microsoft Game Studios	Oct 4, 2006	Unreleased	Unreleased	Unreleased	XBLA		
Tour de France 2011	Sports, Racing	Cyanide	Focus Home Interactive	Unreleased	Unreleased	Unreleased	Nov 22, 2013			
Le Tour De France 2009: The Official Game	Sports & recreation	Cyanide	Focus Home Interactive	Jul 15, 2009	Unreleased	Unreleased	Unreleased	XBLA	XBO	
Tour de France 2012	Sports, Racing	Cyanide	Focus Home Interactive	Unreleased	Unreleased	Unreleased	Nov 22, 2013			
Tour de France 2013: 100 Edition	Sports	Cyanide	Focus Home Interactive	Unreleased	Unreleased	Unreleased	Nov 22, 2013			
Tour de France 2014	Sports, Racing	Cyanide	Focus Home Interactive	Unreleased	Jun 20, 2014	Unreleased	Unreleased			
Tower Bloxx Deluxe	Puzzle & trivia	Digital Chocolate	Microsoft Game Studios	Oct 21, 2009	Unreleased	Unreleased	Unreleased	XBLA	XBO	
Toy Soldiers	Action & adventure	Signal Studios	Microsoft Game Studios	Mar 3, 2010	Unreleased	Unreleased	Unreleased	XBLA	XBO	
Toy Soldiers: Cold War	Action & adventure	Signal Studios	Microsoft Studios	Aug 17, 2011	Unreleased	Unreleased	Unreleased	XBLA	XBO	
Toy Story 3: The Video Game	Platform	Avalanche Software	Disney Interactive Studios	Jun 15, 2010	Jul 16, 2010	Jul 8, 2010	Nov 22, 2013		XBO	
Toy Story Mania!	Party game	Papaya Studio, High Voltage Software	Disney Interactive Studios	Oct 30, 2012	Oct 30, 2012	Unreleased	Nov 22, 2013	K		
Toybox Turbos	Racing & flying	Codemasters	Codemasters	Nov 14, 2014	Unreleased	Unreleased	Unreleased	XBLA	XBO	
Track & Field	Classics	Konami/Digital Eclipse	Konami	Aug 8, 2007	Unreleased	Unreleased	Unreleased	XBLA		
Transformers: Dark of the Moon	Action-adventure	High Moon Studios	Activision	Jun 14, 2011	Jun 24, 2011	Unreleased	Jun 29, 2011			
Transformers: Devastation	Action, beat 'em up	PlatinumGames	Activision	Oct 6, 2015	Oct 9, 2015	Oct 6, 2015	Nov 22, 2013			
Transformers: Fall of Cybertron	Third-person shooter	High Moon Studios	Activision	Aug 21, 2012	Aug 24, 2012	Aug 21, 2012	Nov 22, 2013			
Transformers: Revenge of the Fallen	Third-person shooter	Luxoflux	Activision	Jun 23, 2009	Jun 26, 2009	Unreleased	Nov 22, 2013			
Transformers: Rise of the Dark Spark	Third-person shooter	Edge of Reality	Activision	Jun 20, 2014	Jun 20, 2014	Jun 20, 2014	Nov 22, 2013			
Transformers: The Game	Third-person shooter	Traveller's Tales	Activision	Jun 26, 2007	Jul 20, 2007	Unreleased	Nov 22, 2013			
Transformers: War for Cybertron	Third-person shooter	High Moon Studios	Activision	Jun 22, 2010	Jun 25, 2010	Unreleased	Nov 22, 2013			
Trials Evolution	Racing & flying	RedLynx	Microsoft Studios	Apr 18, 2012	Unreleased	Unreleased	Unreleased	XBLA	XBO	
Trials Fusion	Racing & flying	RedLynx	Ubisoft	Apr 16, 2014	Unreleased	Unreleased	Unreleased	XBLA		
Trials HD	Racing & flying	RedLynx	Microsoft Game Studios	Aug 12, 2009	Unreleased	Unreleased	Unreleased	XBLA	XBO	
Triggerheart Exelica	Shooter	Warashi	Microsoft Game Studios	Feb 27, 2008	Unreleased	Unreleased	Unreleased	XBLA	XBO	
Trine 2	Platformer	Frozenbyte	Atlus USA	Dec 21, 2011	Unreleased	Unreleased	Unreleased	XBLA	XBO	
Trivial Pursuit	Board Game	Electronic Arts	Electronic Arts	Mar 10, 2009	Mar 13, 2009	Unreleased	Nov 22, 2013			
Trivial Pursuit Live!	Card & board	Ubisoft Halifax	Ubisoft	Feb 17, 2015	Unreleased	Unreleased	Unreleased	XBLA		
Tron	Classics	Bally Midway/Digital Eclipse	Disney Interactive Studios	Jan 9, 2008	Unreleased	Unreleased	Unreleased	XBLA		
Tron: Evolution	Action-adventure	Propaganda Games	Disney Interactive Studios	Nov 1, 2010	Nov 1, 2010	Unreleased	Nov 22, 2013		XBO	
Tropico 3	Construct / Manage Sim	Haemimont Games	Kalypso Media	Feb 16, 2010	Nov 13, 2009	Unreleased	Nov 22, 2013			
Tropico 4	Construct / Manage Sim	Haemimont Games	Kalypso Media, FX Interactive ^{(IT and ES)}	Aug 30, 2011	Aug 26, 2011	Unreleased	Nov 22, 2013		XBO	
Tropico 5	Construct / Manage Sim	Haemimont Games	Kalypso Media, FX Interactive ^{(IT and ES)}	Nov 11, 2014	Nov 11, 2014	Nov 11, 2014	Nov 22, 2013			
Tropico 5: Hostile Takeover	Construct / Manage Sim, DLC	Haemimont Games	Kalypso Media, FX Interactive ^{(IT and ES)}	Mar 26, 2015	Unreleased	Unreleased	Unreleased	XBLA		
Trouble Witches Neo!	Shooter	SNK/ Adventure Planning Service	SNK	Apr 27, 2011	Unreleased	Unreleased	Unreleased	XBLA		
Truck Racer	Racing	Kylotonn Games	Bigben Games	Unreleased	Unreleased	Unreleased	Unreleased			
Truth or Lies	Party	Big Ant Studios	THQ	Sep 14, 2010	Nov 12, 2010	Unreleased	Nov 22, 2013			
Tsurugi no Machi no Ihoujin: Shiro no Oukyuu	RPG	Experience Inc.	Experience Inc.	Unreleased	Unreleased	Jun 5, 2014	Unreleased			
Tsuushin Taisen Mahjong: Touryuumon	Puzzle game	AQ Interactive	AQ Interactive	Unreleased	Unreleased	Jan 26, 2006	Unreleased			
Turbo: Super Stunt Squad	Action, Racing	Monkey Bar Games	D3 Publisher^{NA}, Namco Bandai Games^{EU/AU}	Jul 16, 2013	Jul 16, 2013	Unreleased	Nov 22, 2013			
Turning Point: Fall of Liberty	First-person shooter	Spark Unlimited	Codemasters	Feb 26, 2008	Mar 14, 2008	Unreleased	Nov 22, 2013			
Turok	First-person shooter, action	Propaganda Games	Buena Vista Games	Feb 5, 2008	Feb 8, 2008	Apr 10, 2008	Nov 22, 2013			
Twister Mania		Naked Sky Entertainment	Majesco, 505 Games	Nov 1, 2011	Nov 25, 2011	Unreleased	Unreleased	K		
Two Worlds	RPG	Reality Pump Studios	SouthPeak Games	Aug 23, 2007	Sep 7, 2007	Unreleased	Nov 22, 2013			
Two Worlds II	RPG	Reality Pump Studios	SouthPeak Games	Jan 25, 2011	Nov 9, 2010	Unreleased	Nov 22, 2013			
uDraw Pictionary	Party game	Page 44 Studios	THQ	Nov 14, 2010	Feb 24, 2011	Unreleased	Nov 22, 2013			
uDraw Studio Instant Artist	Application	Pipeworks Software	THQ	Nov 15, 2011	Nov 18, 2011	Nov 17, 2011	Nov 22, 2013			
UEFA Champions League 2006–2007	Sports	EA Canada	EA Sports	Mar 20, 2007	Mar 23, 2007	Unreleased	Nov 22, 2013			
UEFA Euro 2008	Sports	EA Canada	EA Sports	May 19, 2008	Apr 15, 2008	Unreleased	Nov 22, 2013			
UFC 2009 Undisputed	Fighting, Sports	Yuke's	THQ	May 19, 2009	May 22, 2009	Unreleased	Nov 22, 2013			
UFC Personal Trainer		Heavy Iron Studios	THQ	Jun 28, 2011	Jul 1, 2011	Unreleased	Jul 7, 2011	K		
UFC Undisputed 3	Fighting, Sports	Yuke's	THQ	Feb 14, 2012	Feb 17, 2012	Unreleased	Nov 22, 2013			
UFC Undisputed 2010	Fighting, Sports	Yuke's	THQ	May 25, 2010	May 28, 2010	May 27, 2010	Nov 22, 2013			
Ugly Americans: Apocalypsegeddon	Action & adventure	Backbone Entertainment	345 Games/ Comedy Central	Aug 31, 2011	Unreleased	Unreleased	Unreleased	XBLA	XBO	
Ultimate Marvel vs. Capcom 3	Fighting	Capcom	Capcom	Nov 15, 2011	Nov 25, 2011	Nov 17, 2011	Nov 22, 2013			
Ultimate Mortal Kombat 3	Classics	Midway Games/ Digital Eclipse	Midway Games	Oct 21, 2006	Unreleased	Unreleased	Unreleased	XBLA		
Ultra Street Fighter IV	Fighting, update	Capcom	Capcom	Aug 5, 2014	Aug 5, 2014	Aug 5, 2014	Nov 22, 2013			
Unbound Saga	Action & adventure	Vogster Entertainment	Microsoft Game Studios	Dec 1, 2010	Unreleased	Unreleased	Unreleased	XBLA	XBO	
Under Defeat HD (Deluxe Edition)	Scrolling shooter	G.rev	Rising Star Games, G.rev	Unreleased	Nov 9, 2012	Feb 23, 2012	Unreleased			
The UnderGarden	Action & adventure	Artech Studios/Vitamin G Studios	Atari	Nov 10, 2010	Unreleased	Unreleased	Unreleased	XBLA		
Undertow	Action & adventure	Chair Entertainment	Microsoft Game Studios	Nov 21, 2007	Unreleased	Unreleased	Unreleased	XBLA	XBO	
Universe at War: Earth Assault	RTS	Petroglyph Games	Sega	Mar 25, 2008	Mar 7, 2008	Unreleased	Nov 22, 2013			
Uno	Card & board	Carbonated Games	Microsoft Game Studios	May 9, 2006	Unreleased	Unreleased	Unreleased	XBLA		
Uno Rush	Card & board	Microsoft Game Studios	Microsoft Game Studios	Mar 25, 2009	Unreleased	Unreleased	Unreleased	XBLA		
Unreal Tournament 3	First-person shooter	Epic Games	Midway Games	Jul 7, 2008	Jul 4, 2008	Unreleased	Nov 22, 2013		XBO	
Up	Action-adventure	Heavy Iron Studios	THQ	May 26, 2009	Oct 2, 2009	Unreleased	Nov 22, 2013			
Valiant Hearts: The Great War	Puzzle & trivia	Ubisoft Montpellier	Ubisoft	Jun 25, 2014	Unreleased	Unreleased	Unreleased	XBLA		
Vampire Rain	Stealth, survival horror	Artoon	AQ Interactive	Jul 3, 2007	Jun 29, 2007	Jan 25, 2007	Nov 22, 2013			
Vancouver 2010	Sports (Olympic)	Eurocom	Sega	Jan 12, 2010	Jan 15, 2010	Unreleased	Nov 22, 2013			
Vandal Hearts: Flames of Judgment	Role playing	Hijinx Studios	Konami	Jan 20, 2010	Unreleased	Unreleased	Unreleased	XBLA		
Vanquish	Third-person shooter	PlatinumGames	Sega	Oct 19, 2010	Oct 22, 2010	Oct 21, 2010	Nov 22, 2013		XBO	
Velvet Assassin	Stealth	Replay Studios	SouthPeak Games	Apr 28, 2009	May 8, 2009	Unreleased	Nov 22, 2013			
Venetica	RPG	Deck13	Rombax Games	Jan 11, 2011	Dec 18, 2009	Unreleased	Nov 22, 2013			
Victorious: Time to Shine		High Voltage Software	D3 Publisher^{NA}, Namco Bandai Games^{EU/AU}	Nov 15, 2011	Feb 10, 2012	Unreleased	Feb 9, 2012	K		
Vigilante 8 Arcade	Action & adventure	Isopod Labs	Activision	Nov 5, 2008	Unreleased	Unreleased	Unreleased	XBLA		
Viking: Battle for Asgard	Hack and slash, action-adventure	Creative Assembly	Sega	Mar 25, 2008	Mar 28, 2008	Unreleased	Nov 22, 2013			
Virtua Fighter 2	Fighting	Sega AM2	Sega	Nov 28, 2012	Unreleased	Unreleased	Unreleased	XBLA	XBO	
Virtua Fighter 5 Final Showdown	Fighting	Sega AM2	Sega	Jun 6, 2012	Unreleased	Unreleased	Unreleased	XBLA	XBO	
Virtua Fighter 5 Online (Note: Virtua Fighter 5 Live Arena in Japan and titled Virtua Fighter 5 with no subtitle in Europe and Australia.)	Fighting	Sega-AM2	Sega	Oct 30, 2007	Oct 26, 2007	Dec 6, 2007	Nov 22, 2013			
Virtua Striker	Sports & recreation	Sega AM2	Sega	Unreleased	Unreleased	Feb 13, 2013	Unreleased	XBLA		
Virtua Tennis 2009	Sports	Sumo Digital	Sega	Jun 2, 2009	May 22, 2009	Unreleased	Nov 22, 2013			
Virtua Tennis 3	Sports	Sumo Digital	Sega	Mar 20, 2007	Mar 23, 2007	Unreleased	Nov 22, 2013			
Virtua Tennis 4	Sports	SEGA-AM3	Sega	May 10, 2011	Apr 29, 2011	Jun 30, 2011	Nov 22, 2013	K		
Viva Piñata	Sim	Rare	Microsoft Game Studios	Nov 9, 2006	Dec 1, 2006	Jan 11, 2007	Nov 30, 2006		XBO XE	
Viva Piñata: Party Animals	Sim	Krome Studios	Microsoft Game Studios	Oct 30, 2007	Nov 16, 2007	Dec 6, 2007	Nov 15, 2007			
Viva Piñata: Trouble in Paradise	Sim	Rare	Microsoft Game Studios	Sep 2, 2008	Sep 5, 2008	Sep 11, 2008	Sep 11, 2008		XBO XE	
The Voice I Want You	Party Game	Activision	Activision	Oct 11, 2014	Oct 11, 2014	Unreleased	Nov 22, 2013			
Voltron: Defender of the Universe	Shooter	Behaviour Interactive	THQ	Nov 30, 2011	Unreleased	Unreleased	Unreleased	XBLA		
Voodoo Dice	Puzzle & trivia	Exkee	Ubisoft	May 26, 2010	Unreleased	Unreleased	Unreleased	XBLA		
W.L.O. Sekai Renai Kikō	Visual novel	5pb./Akabeisoft2	5pb.	Unreleased	Unreleased	Jun 3, 2010	Nov 22, 2013			
The Walking Dead	Graphic adventure	Telltale Games	Telltale Games	Dec 11, 2012	May 10, 2013	May 9, 2013	Nov 22, 2013		XBO	
The Walking Dead: Michonne – A Telltale Miniseries	Action & adventure	Telltale Games	Telltale Games	Feb 23, 2016	Unreleased	Unreleased	Unreleased	XBLA	XBO	
The Walking Dead: Season Two	Graphic adventure	Telltale Games	Telltale Games	Oct 14, 2014	Oct 24, 2014	Oct 31, 2014	Nov 22, 2013		XBO	
The Walking Dead: Survival Instinct	First-person shooter	Terminal Reality	Activision	Mar 19, 2013	Mar 22, 2013	Unreleased	Nov 22, 2013			
WALL-E	Platformer	Heavy Iron Studios	THQ	Jun 24, 2008	Jul 4, 2008	Unreleased	Nov 22, 2013			
Wallace & Gromit's Grand Adventures Episode 1: Fright of the Bumblebees	Family & educational	Telltale Games	Microsoft Game Studios	May 27, 2009	Unreleased	Unreleased	Unreleased	XBLA		
Wallace & Gromit's Grand Adventures Episode 2: The Last Resort	Family & educational	Telltale Games	Microsoft Game Studios	Nov 4, 2009	Unreleased	Unreleased	Unreleased	XBLA		
Wallace & Gromit's Grand Adventures Episode 3: Muzzled!	Family & educational	Telltale Games	Microsoft Game Studios	Nov 4, 2009	Unreleased	Unreleased	Unreleased	XBLA		
Wallace & Gromit's Grand Adventures Episode 4: The Bogey Man	Family & educational	Telltale Games	Microsoft Game Studios	Nov 4, 2009	Unreleased	Unreleased	Unreleased	XBLA		
Wanted: Weapons of Fate	Third-person shooter	GRIN	Warner Bros. Interactive Entertainment	Mar 24, 2009	Apr 3, 2009	Jun 25, 2009	Nov 22, 2013			
Warface	Shooter	Blackwood Games	Crytek	Mar 26, 2014	Unreleased	Unreleased	Unreleased	XBLA		
Warhammer 40,000: Kill Team	Shooter	Relic Entertainment/THQ Digital Studios UK	Sega	Jul 13, 2011	Unreleased	Unreleased	Unreleased	XBLA		
Warhammer 40,000: Space Marine	Action, Third-person	Relic Entertainment	THQ	Sep 6, 2011	Sep 9, 2011	Unreleased	Nov 22, 2013			
Warhammer: Battle March (Note: Warhammer: Mark of Chaos and its upcoming expansion pack combined together into one game.)	RTT	Namco Bandai Games	Namco Bandai Games	Sep 2, 2008	Sep 12, 2008	Unreleased	Nov 22, 2013			
Warlords (2012)	Action & adventure	Griptonite Games/Atari	Atari	Nov 14, 2012	Unreleased	Unreleased	Unreleased	XBLA		
Warlords	Classics	Stainless Games/Atari	Atari	May 28, 2008	Unreleased	Unreleased	Unreleased	XBLA		
The War of the Worlds	Platformer	Other Ocean Interactive	Paramount Digital Entertainment	Oct 26, 2011	Unreleased	Unreleased	Unreleased	XBLA		
War World	Action & adventure	Third Wave Games	Ubisoft	Oct 1, 2008	Unreleased	Unreleased	Unreleased	XBLA		
Warp	Action & adventure	trapdoor	Electronic Arts	Feb 15, 2012	Unreleased	Unreleased	Unreleased	XBLA		
Warriors Orochi (Note: Originally released Musō Orochi in Japan.)	Hack and slash	Omega Force	Koei	Sep 18, 2007	Sep 21, 2007	Mar 21, 2007	Nov 22, 2013			
Warriors Orochi 2 (Note: Originally released as Musō Orochi Maō Sairin in Japan.)	Hack and slash	Omega Force	Koei	Sep 23, 2008	Sep 19, 2008	Sep 4, 2008	Nov 22, 2013			
Warriors Orochi 3 (Note: Originally released as Musou Orochi 2 in Japan.)	Hack and slash	Omega Force	Tecmo Koei	Mar 20, 2012	Apr 6, 2012	Dec 22, 2011	Nov 22, 2013			
Warriors: Legends of Troy	Hack and slash	Koei Canada	Tecmo Koei	Unreleased	Unreleased	May 26, 2011	Nov 22, 2013			
The Warriors: Street Brawl	Action & adventure	CXTM	Paramount Digital Entertainment	Sep 23, 2009	Unreleased	Unreleased	Unreleased	XBLA		
WarTech: Senko no Ronde	Fighting, Shoot 'em up	G.rev	Ubisoft	May 29, 2007	Jun 8, 2007	Jul 27, 2006	Nov 22, 2013			
Watch Dogs	Action-adventure, Open World, stealth	Ubisoft Montreal	Ubisoft	May 27, 2014	May 27, 2014	May 27, 2014	Nov 22, 2013			
Watchmen: The End Is Nigh - Part I	Action & adventure	Deadline Games	Warner Bros. Interactive Entertainment	Mar 4, 2009	Unreleased	Unreleased	Unreleased	XBLA		
Watchmen: The End Is Nigh - Part II	Action & adventure	Deadline Games	Warner Bros. Interactive Entertainment	Aug 26, 2009	Unreleased	Unreleased	Unreleased	XBLA		
Watchmen: The End Is Nigh Parts 1 and 2	Beat 'em up, action	Deadline Games	Warner Bros. Interactive Entertainment	Jul 21, 2009	Jul 24, 2009	Unreleased	Nov 22, 2013			
Way of the Dogg	Fighting	Echo Peak	505 Games	May 3, 2013	Unreleased	Unreleased	Unreleased	XBLA		
Way of the Samurai 3	Action-adventure	Acquire	Spike	Oct 20, 2009	Mar 12, 2010	Feb 26, 2009	Nov 22, 2013			
Wet	Third-person shooter, action	Artificial Mind and Movement	Bethesda Softworks	Sep 15, 2009	Sep 18, 2009	Unreleased	Nov 22, 2013			
Wheel of Fortune	Trivia	Pipeworks Software	THQ	Oct 16, 2012	Oct 16, 2012	Unreleased	Nov 22, 2013			
Wheelman	Racing, action, Open World	Tigon Studios	Midway Games	Mar 24, 2009	Mar 27, 2009	Unreleased	Nov 22, 2013			
Where the Wild Things Are	Platform	Amaze Entertainment	Warner Bros. Interactive Entertainment	Oct 13, 2009	Nov 27, 2009	Unreleased	Nov 22, 2013			
Who Wants to Be a Millionaire? 2012 Edition		Ludia	Ubisoft	Nov 1, 2011	Unreleased	Unreleased	Unreleased	K		
Who Wants to Be a Millionaire? Special Editions	Family & educational	Doublesix	Deep Silver	Nov 23, 2011	Oct 16, 2013	Unreleased	Unreleased	XBLA		
Wik and the Fable of Souls	Platformer	Reflexive Entertainment	Microsoft Game Studios	Dec 15, 2005	Unreleased	Unreleased	Unreleased	XBLA		
Wing Commander Arena	Action & adventure	Gaia Industries	Electronic Arts	Jul 25, 2007	Unreleased	Unreleased	Unreleased	XBLA		
Winning Post World 2010	Horse Racing	Koei	Koei	Unreleased	Unreleased	Apr 2, 2010	Unreleased			
Winter Sports 2: The Next Challenge (Note: Released as Winter Sports 2009 in Europe.)	Sports	49 Games	Conspiracy Entertainment	Nov 18, 2008	Nov 27, 2008	Unreleased	Nov 22, 2013			
Winter Sports 2010	Sports	49 Games	RTL Entertainment	Unreleased	Nov 12, 2009	Unreleased	Unreleased			
Winter Sports 2011	Sports	Zoo Games	RTL Entertainment	Unreleased	Nov 29, 2010	Unreleased	Unreleased			
Winter Stars		49 Games	Deep Silver	Nov 15, 2011	Nov 25, 2011	Unreleased	Unreleased	K		
Wipeout 2		Activision	Activision	Oct 11, 2011	Unreleased	Unreleased	Unreleased	K		
Wipeout 3		Activision	Activision	Sep 24, 2012	Unreleased	Unreleased	Unreleased	K		
Wipeout: Create & Crash	Sports	Activision	Activision	Oct 15, 2013	Oct 15, 2013	Unreleased	Unreleased	K		
Wipeout in the Zone		Activision	Activision	Jun 14, 2011	Unreleased	Unreleased	Unreleased	K		
The Witcher 2: Assassins of Kings	Action RPG, Hack and slash	CD Projekt Red	CD Projekt	Apr 17, 2012	Apr 17, 2012	Apr 17, 2012	Nov 22, 2013		XBO XE	
Wits and Wagers	Card & board	Hidden Path Entertainment	Microsoft Game Studios	May 7, 2008	Unreleased	Unreleased	Unreleased	XBLA		
The Wolf Among Us	Graphic adventure	Telltale Games	Telltale Games	Nov 4, 2014	Oct 17, 2014	Unreleased	Nov 22, 2013			
Wolf of the Battlefield: Commando 3	Action & adventure	Backbone Entertainment	Capcom	Jun 11, 2008	Unreleased	Unreleased	Unreleased	XBLA	XBO	
Wolfenstein	First-person shooter	Raven Software	Activision	Aug 18, 2009	Aug 21, 2009	Unreleased	Nov 22, 2013			
Wolfenstein 3D	Shooter	id Software	Bethesda Softworks	Jun 3, 2009	Unreleased	Unreleased	Unreleased	XBLA	XBO	
Wolfenstein: The New Order	First-person shooter	MachineGames	Bethesda Softworks	May 20, 2014	May 23, 2014	May 22, 2014	Nov 22, 2013			
Word Puzzle	Puzzle & trivia	InterServ	Microsoft Game Studios	Nov 7, 2007	Unreleased	Unreleased	Unreleased	XBLA	XBO	
World Championship Poker: Featuring Howard Lederer "All In"	Poker	Crave Entertainment	Crave Entertainment	Aug 29, 2006	Nov 30, 2007	Unreleased	Nov 22, 2013			
World Gone Sour	Action & adventure	Playbrains	Capcom	Apr 11, 2012	Unreleased	Unreleased	Unreleased	XBLA		
A World of Keflings	Strategy & simulation	NinjaBee	Microsoft Game Studios	Dec 22, 2010	Unreleased	Unreleased	Unreleased	XBLA	XBO	
World of Outlaws: Sprint Cars	Racing	Big Ant Studios	THQ	Feb 9, 2010	Jun 17, 2010	Unreleased	Nov 22, 2013			
World of Tanks	Action & adventure	Wargaming West	Microsoft Studios	Feb 12, 2014	Unreleased	Unreleased	Unreleased	XBLA		
World Series of Poker 2008: Battle for the Bracelets	Poker	Left Field Productions	Activision	Sep 25, 2007	Nov 30, 2007	Unreleased	Nov 22, 2013			
World Series of Poker: Full House Pro	Card & board	Pipeworks Software	Microsoft Studios	Sep 4, 2013	Unreleased	Unreleased	Unreleased	XBLA		
World Series of Poker: Tournament of Champions	Poker	Left Field Productions	Activision	Sep 19, 2006	Nov 10, 2006	Unreleased	Nov 22, 2013			
World Snooker Championship 2007	Sports	Blade Interactive	Sega Europe	Unreleased	Unreleased	Unreleased	Nov 22, 2013			
Worms	Strategy & simulation	Team17	Microsoft Game Studios	Mar 7, 2007	Unreleased	Unreleased	Unreleased	XBLA		
Worms 2: Armageddon	Strategy & simulation	Team17	Microsoft Game Studios	Jul 1, 2009	Unreleased	Unreleased	Unreleased	XBLA		
Worms Revolution	Strategy & simulation	Team17	Warner Bros. Interactive Entertainment	Oct 10, 2012	Unreleased	Unreleased	Unreleased	XBLA		
Worms Ultimate Mayhem	Strategy & simulation	Team17	Microsoft Studios	Sep 28, 2011	Unreleased	Unreleased	Unreleased	XBLA		
WRC 2: FIA World Rally Championship	Racing	Milestone srl	Black Bean Games	Unreleased	Unreleased	Oct 14, 2011	Oct 14, 2011			
WRC 3: FIA World Rally Championship	Racing	Milestone srl	Black Bean Games	Unreleased	Unreleased	Oct 13, 2012	Dec 13, 2012			
WRC 4: FIA World Rally Championship	Racing	Milestone srl	Bigben Interactive	Unreleased	Unreleased	Oct 25, 2013	Nov 22, 2013			
WRC 5	Racing	Kylotonn	Bigben Interactive	Oct 13, 2015	Oct 13, 2015	Oct 13, 2015	Oct 13, 2015			
WRC FIA World Rally Championship	Racing	Milestone srl	Black Bean Games	Unreleased	Unreleased	Oct 8, 2010	Oct 7, 2010			
WRC Powerslide	Racing & flying	Milestone srl	Milestone srl	Mar 8, 2013	Unreleased	Unreleased	Unreleased	XBLA		
Wreckateer	Kinect	Iron Galaxy	Microsoft Studios	Jul 25, 2012	Unreleased	Unreleased	Unreleased	K XBLA		
Wrecked: Revenge Revisited	Racing & flying	Supersonic Software	505 Games	Mar 28, 2012	Unreleased	Unreleased	Unreleased	XBLA		
Wrestle Kingdom (Note: Originally released as Ressuru Kingudamu in Japan.)	Fighting, Sports	Yuke's	Yuke's	Unreleased	Unreleased	Dec 22, 2005	Nov 22, 2013			
WSC REAL 09: World Snooker Championship (Note: Known as WSC Real 08: World Snooker Championship in Australia.)	Sports	Blade Interactive	Koch Media	Unreleased	Apr 3, 2009	Unreleased	Jul 10, 2008			
WSC Real 11: World Snooker Championship	Sports	Blade Interactive	Koch Media	Unreleased	Apr 15, 2011	Unreleased	Unreleased			
WWE '12	Fighting, Sports	Yuke's	THQ	Nov 22, 2011	Nov 25, 2011	Jan 26, 2012	Nov 22, 2013			
WWE '13	Fighting, Sports	Yuke's	THQ	Oct 30, 2012	Nov 1, 2012	Nov 1, 2012	Nov 22, 2013			
WWE 2K14	Fighting, Sports	Yuke's	2K Sports	Oct 29, 2013	Oct 29, 2013	Oct 29, 2013	Nov 22, 2013			
WWE 2K15	Fighting, Sports	Yuke's	2K Sports	Oct 28, 2014	Oct 31, 2014	Oct 31, 2014	Nov 22, 2013			
WWE 2K16	Fighting, Sports	Yuke's	2K Sports	Oct 27, 2015	Oct 30, 2015	Oct 30, 2015	Nov 22, 2013			
WWE 2K17	Fighting, Sports	Yuke's	2K Sports	Oct 31, 2016	Oct 30, 2016	Oct 30, 2016	Nov 22, 2013			
WWE All Stars	Fighting, Sports	THQ San Diego	THQ	Mar 29, 2011	Apr 1, 2011	Unreleased	Nov 22, 2013			
WWE Legends of WrestleMania	Fighting, Sports	Yuke's	THQ	Mar 24, 2009	Mar 20, 2009	Jul 9, 2009	Nov 22, 2013			
WWE SmackDown vs. Raw 2007	Fighting, Sports	Yuke's	THQ	Nov 14, 2006	Nov 10, 2006	Jan 25, 2007	Nov 22, 2013			
WWE SmackDown vs. Raw 2008	Fighting, Sports	Yuke's	THQ	Nov 13, 2007	Nov 9, 2007	Feb 14, 2008	Nov 22, 2013			
WWE SmackDown vs. Raw 2009	Fighting, Sports	Yuke's	THQ	Nov 11, 2008	Nov 7, 2008	Jan 22, 2009	Nov 22, 2013			
WWE SmackDown vs. Raw 2010	Fighting, Sports	Yuke's	THQ	Oct 20, 2009	Oct 23, 2009	Jan 28, 2010	Nov 22, 2013			
WWE SmackDown vs. Raw 2011	Fighting, Sports	Yuke's	THQ	Oct 26, 2010	Oct 26, 2010	Unreleased	Nov 22, 2013			
X-Blades	Action-adventure, hack and slash	Gaijin Entertainment	TopWare Interactive	Feb 10, 2009	Jan 28, 2009	Apr 30, 2009	Nov 22, 2013			
XCOM: Enemy Unknown	Turn-based strategy, RTS	Firaxis Games	2K Games	Oct 9, 2012	Oct 12, 2012	Unreleased	Nov 22, 2013		XBO	
XCOM: Enemy Within	Turn-based strategy, RTS, stand-alone expansion	Firaxis Games	2K Games	Nov 12, 2013	Nov 15, 2013	Unreleased	Nov 22, 2013		XBO	
Xevious	Classics	Bandai Namco Entertainment	Bandai Namco Entertainment	May 23, 2007	Unreleased	Unreleased	Unreleased	XBLA		
The X-Factor	Rhythm	Hydravision	Deep Silver	Oct 29, 2010	Oct 29, 2010	Unreleased	Unreleased			
X-Men	Classics	Konami/ Backbone Entertainment	Konami	Dec 15, 2010	Unreleased	Unreleased	Unreleased	XBLA		
X-Men: Destiny	Beat'em up, Action RPG	Silicon Knights	Activision	Sep 27, 2011	Sep 30, 2011	Oct 5, 2011	Nov 22, 2013			
X-Men: The Official Game	Beat'em up, action	Z-Axis	Activision	May 16, 2006	May 19, 2006	Nov 22, 2006	Nov 22, 2013			
X-Men Origins: Wolverine	Action-adventure	Raven Software	Activision	May 1, 2009	May 1, 2009	Unreleased	Nov 22, 2013			
Xotic	Shooter	WXP Games	Valcon Games	Nov 16, 2011	Unreleased	Unreleased	Unreleased	XBLA		
Yaiba: Ninja Gaiden Z	Action, hack and slash	Team Ninja, Spark Unlimited, Comcept	Tecmo Koei	Mar 18, 2014	Mar 21, 2014	Mar 6, 2014	Nov 22, 2013			
Yaris	Racing & flying	Castaway Entertainment/ Backbone Emeryville	Castaway Entertainment	Oct 10, 2007	Unreleased	Unreleased	Unreleased	XBLA		
Yar's Revenge	Action & adventure	Killspace Entertainment	Atari	Apr 13, 2011	Unreleased	Unreleased	Unreleased	XBLA		
Yie Ar Kung-Fu	Classics	Konami/Digital Eclipse	Konami	Jul 18, 2007	Unreleased	Unreleased	Unreleased	XBLA		
Yo-Ho Kablammo	Action & adventure	Canalside Studios	Microsoft Game Studios	Sep 2, 2009	Unreleased	Unreleased	Unreleased	XBLA		
Yoostar 2		Blitz Games Studios	Yoostar Entertainment Group	Mar 8, 2011	Mar 11, 2011	Unreleased	Mar 10, 2011	K		
Yoostar on MTV		Blitz Games Studios	Yoostar Entertainment Group	Nov 15, 2011	Unreleased	Unreleased	Nov 15, 2011	K		
Yosumin! Live	Puzzle & trivia	Square Enix	Square Enix	May 27, 2009	Unreleased	Unreleased	Unreleased	XBLA	XBO	
You Don't Know Jack	Party, Trivia	Jellyvision Games, Iron Galaxy	THQ	Feb 8, 2011	Feb 8, 2011	Unreleased	Nov 22, 2013			
Young Justice: Legacy	Action-adventure Action role-play	Freedom Factory Studios	Warner Bros. Interactive Entertainment	Nov 19, 2013	Nov 22, 2013	Unreleased	Nov 22, 2013			
Your Shape: Fitness Evolved		Ubisoft Montreal	Ubisoft	Nov 4, 2010	Nov 10, 2010	Nov 18, 2010	Dec 9, 2010	K		
Your Shape Fitness Evolved 2012		Ubisoft Montreal	Ubisoft	Nov 8, 2011	Nov 11, 2011	Nov 17, 2011	Dec 15, 2011	K		
You're in the Movies	Party	Zoë Mode	Codemasters	Nov 17, 2008	Nov 28, 2008	Apr 16, 2009	Nov 22, 2013			
Yu-Gi-Oh! 5D's Decade Duels	Card Battle	Other Ocean	Konami	Nov 3, 2011	Nov 3, 2011	Nov 3, 2011	Nov 3, 2011	XBLA		
Yu-Gi-Oh! 5D's Decade Duels Plus	Card Battle	Other Ocean	Konami	Feb 13, 2013	Feb 13, 2013	Unreleased	Feb 13, 2013	XBLA		
Yu-Gi-Oh! Millennium Duels	Card Battle	Other Ocean	Konami	Mar 26, 2014	Apr 23, 2014	Unreleased	Apr 23, 2014	XBLA		
Zegapain NOT	Tank & Mecha Sim	Namco Bandai Games	Namco Bandai Games	Unreleased	Unreleased	Dec 7, 2006	Nov 22, 2013			
Zegapain XOR	Tank & Mecha Sim	Cavia	Namco Bandai Games	Unreleased	Unreleased	Jul 27, 2006	Nov 22, 2013			
Zeit²	Shooter	Brightside Games	Ubisoft	Jan 12, 2011	Unreleased	Unreleased	Unreleased	XBLA		
ZEN Pinball 2: Super League Football	Pinball, DLC	Zen Studios	Zen Studios	Feb 19, 2014	Unreleased	Unreleased	Unreleased	XBLA		
Zeno Clash: Ultimate Edition	Action & adventure	ACE Team	Atlus	May 5, 2010	Unreleased	Unreleased	Unreleased	XBLA		
Zeno Clash II	Action & adventure	ACE Team	Atlus	Jul 26, 2013	Unreleased	Unreleased	Unreleased	XBLA		
Zoids Assault	Turn-based strategy	Tomy	Tomy	Sep 9, 2008	Sep 9, 2008	Oct 18, 2007	Nov 22, 2013			
Zoids Infinity EX Neo	Turn-based strategy	Tomy	Tomy	Unreleased	Unreleased	Mar 30, 2006	Nov 22, 2013			
Zombie Apocalypse	Shooter	Nihilistic Software	Konami	Sep 23, 2009	Unreleased	Unreleased	Unreleased	XBLA		
Zombie Apocalypse: Never Die Alone	Shooter	Backbone Entertainment	Konami	Oct 26, 2011	Unreleased	Unreleased	Unreleased	XBLA		
Zombie Driver HD	Action & adventure	Exor Studios	Cyberfront Corporation	Oct 17, 2012	Unreleased	Unreleased	Unreleased	XBLA		
Zombie Wranglers	Action & adventure	Frozen Codebase	Activision	May 6, 2009	Unreleased	Unreleased	Unreleased	XBLA		
Zone of the Enders HD Collection (Note: This is a high-definition remastering of the first three games in the series.)	Action	Kojima Productions, High Voltage Software, Hexa Drive	Konami	Oct 30, 2012	Oct 30, 2012	Oct 25, 2012	Nov 22, 2013		XBO	
Zoo Tycoon	Business simulation	Frontier Developments	Microsoft Studios	Nov 22, 2013	Nov 22, 2013	Nov 22, 2013	Nov 22, 2013			
Zuma	Puzzle & trivia	PopCap Games	Microsoft Game Studios	Nov 22, 2005	Unreleased	Unreleased	Unreleased	XBLA	XBO	
Zuma's Revenge!	Puzzle	PopCap Games	PopCap Games	Sep 18, 2012	Sep 18, 2012	Unreleased	Nov 22, 2013		XBO	
Zumba Fitness		Pipeworks Software	Majesco, 505 Games	Nov 18, 2010	Nov 26, 2010	Dec 2, 2010	Unreleased	K		
Zumba Fitness Core		Zoë Mode	Majesco	Oct 16, 2012	Unreleased	Unreleased	Unreleased	K		
Zumba Fitness Rush		Pipeworks Software	Majesco, 505 Games	Feb 13, 2012	Feb 24, 2012	Feb 24, 2012	Unreleased	K		
Zumba Fitness: World Party		Zoë Mode	Majesco	Nov 5, 2013	Nov 22, 2013	Nov 22, 2013	Unreleased	K		
Zumba Kids		Zoë Mode	Majesco	Nov 19, 2013	Dec 6, 2013	Dec 6, 2013	Unreleased	K		

== Cancelled games ==
K Kinect optional K required	DL Downloadable Titles	XBLA Xbox Live Arcade Titles

Title	Genre(s)	Developer(s)	Publisher(s)	Addons	Ref.
Wendy Wu: Homecoming Warrior Kick-in Challenge	Role playing	Papaya Studio	Disney Interactive Studios		
Mortal Kombat X	Fighting	NetherRealm Studios	Warner Bros. Interactive Entertainment		
Obut Pétanque	Sports	Kylotonn	Bigben Interactive		
The Smurfs Dance Party		Land Ho!	Ubisoft	K	
