= Superbike World Championship =

International motorcycle racing

FIM Superbike World Championship
- Logo since 2022
- Category: Motorcycle racing
- Region: International
- Inaugural season: 1988
- Constructors: Bimota, BMW, Ducati, Honda, Kawasaki, Yamaha
- Tyre suppliers: Michelin, Dunlop, Pirelli, Bridgestone, Goodyear
- Riders' champion: (Italy) Nicolò Bulega
- Makes' champion: (Italy) Ducati
- Teams' champion: (Italy) Aruba.it Racing – Ducati
- Official website: worldsbk.com

Superbike World Championship (also known as WorldSBK, SBK, World Superbike, WSB, or WSBK) is a silhouette road racing series based on heavily modified production sports motorcycles.

The championship was founded in 1988. The Superbike World Championship consists of a series of rounds held on permanent racing facilities. Each round has two full length races and, from 2019, an additional ten-lap sprint race known as the Superpole race. The results of all three races are combined to determine three annual World Championships, one for riders, one for manufacturers and, as of 2024, a Teams World Championship.

The motorcycles that race in the championship are tuned versions of motorcycles available for sale to the public, by contrast with MotoGP where purpose built machines are used. MotoGP is the motorcycle world's equivalent of Formula One, whereas Superbike racing is similar to sports car racing.

Europe is Superbike World Championship's traditional centre and leading market. However, rounds have been held in the United States, Canada, Malaysia, Indonesia, Thailand, Japan, Argentina, Australia, New Zealand, Qatar, and South Africa and the series plans on keeping extra-European circuits in rotation.

The championship is regulated by the Fédération Internationale de Motocyclisme (FIM) and organised by MotoGP Sports Entertainment Group.

== History ==
=== Early years ===
The Superbike World Championship began in 1988, being open to modified versions of road bike models available to the public. For many years, the formula allowed for machines with 1,000 cc V-twin engines (principally Ducati, but later Aprilia and Honda) to go up against the 750 cc four-cylinder engines (Honda, Yamaha, Kawasaki and Suzuki). For the first few seasons Honda won with the RC30, but gradually the twins got the upper hand. Using 1,000 cc V-twin engines benefited Ducati and it was able to dominate the championship for many years, but the 750 cc was second or third each year between 1994 and 1999.

Held under the FIM, the Formula TT from 1977 to 1989 once constituted the official motorcycle World Cup. Having proven itself both popular and commercially viable, it was decided by the end of the 1990 season to end the Formula TT and the Superbike World Championship would succeed it.

=== 1990s and early 2000s ===
From 1993 to 1999 Carl Fogarty and Ducati dominated, Fogarty won the title a record four times and finished as runner-up twice on factory Ducatis. Troy Corser also won the 1996 title and finished as runner-up in 1995, both times on a Ducati.

Realizing that 1,000 cc V-twin engines suited the superbike racing formula more, Honda introduced its own V-Twin powered motorcycle the VTR1000 SPW in 2000. The result was clear right away as Colin Edwards won the championship in the bike's first year of competition. Ducati regained the title in 2001 with Troy Bayliss. Colin Edwards again reclaimed the title in 2002 on the same VTR1000 SPW bike.

=== 2002 ===
Colin Edwards won his second championship in what was arguably the most impressive comeback in the history of motorcycle racing. The season started with Troy Bayliss winning the first 6 races and by the end of race 1 at WeatherTech Raceway Laguna Seca he had 14 wins and was leading the championship by 58 points. Race 2 at WeatherTech Raceway Laguna Seca was the start of Colin Edwards' comeback, he went on to win all 9 remaining races and (aided by a race 2 crash for Bayliss at Assen) Edwards won the championship at the final race of the season at Imola. The final race of the season saw both riders fighting wheel to wheel for the entire race. The race is known by fans as the "Showdown at Imola".

The manufacturer's championship was won by Ducati. During these years the Superbike World Championship reached the zenith of its popularity, with global fan and full factory support.

=== 2003 ===
In 2003 the FIM changed the rules to allow 1,000 cc machines (twins, triples or four-cylinder) to race. Rule changes in MotoGP to allow four-stroke engines meant that the Japanese manufacturers focused their resources there, leaving the Superbike World Championship with limited factory involvement (only Ducati and Suzuki).

2003 also saw the entry of Carl Fogarty’s Foggy Petronas FP1. The bike was developed under the previous regulations and was powered by a three cylinder 900 cc engine. With most of the field running Ducati motorcycles, the championship received the derogatory title "the Ducati Cup". The factory Ducati Team entered the only two Ducati 999s in the field, taking 20 wins from 24 races in a season where all races were won by Ducati. Neil Hodgson won the title on a factory Ducati.

=== 2004 ===
In an effort to create a more competitive field in 2004 organizers announced a series of changes to the championship. The most significant was that from 2004 the teams have had to run on Pirelli control or 'spec' tyres. The decision to award the control tyre to Pirelli was controversial. The Pirelli tyres were considered to be below the standard of Dunlop and Michelin that most of the teams had been using. Dunlop looked to take legal action against the decision while Pirelli claimed that Michelin and Dunlop were also asked if they would be interested in the one-make tyre rule contract. Partly as a result of the control tyres, Motorcycle Sports Manufacturer Association (Aprilia, Ducati, Honda, Kawasaki, Suzuki and Yamaha) announced that no MSMA teams would participate in the Superbike World Championship, later modifying their statement allowing Ducati to participate.

A few privateers chose to run Japanese bikes in 2004. Ten Kate Honda with Chris Vermeulen as its rider, won races and actually contended for the title that eventually was won by James Toseland and Ducati.

=== 2005 ===
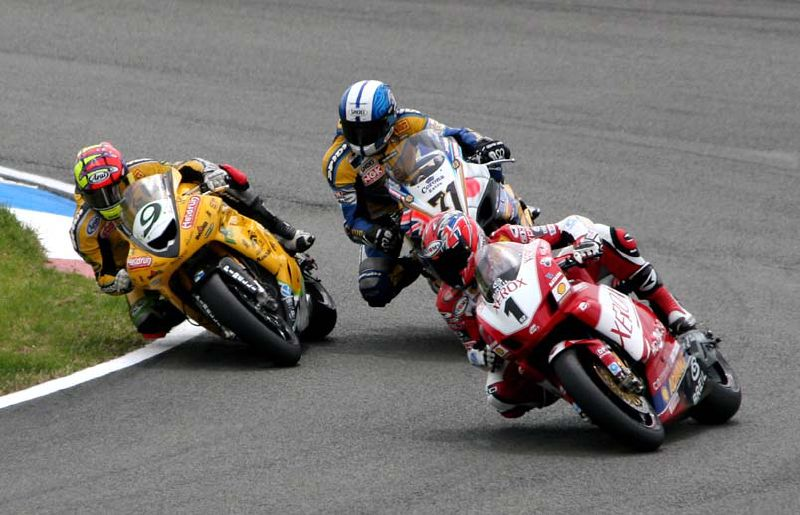
James Toseland (1) on a Ducati leads Chris Walker (9) on a Kawasaki and Yukio Kagayama (71) on a Suzuki during a 2005 Superbike World Championship race

Following Ten Kate Honda's success Japanese motorcycles made a return in 2005 with major teams from all four Japanese manufacturers run through teams ran by European importers. Troy Corser won the 2005 championship, giving Suzuki its first Superbike World Championship title.

Troy Bayliss won the Superbike World Championship three times with Ducati

=== 2006 ===
2006 saw the return of Australian Troy Bayliss to the Superbike World Championship after three years in MotoGP. The combination of Bayliss and Ducati proved unstoppable and they dominated the season, winning 12 races. Honda-mounted James Toseland and Yamaha's Noriyuki Haga battled for second with the British rider coming out on top. Defending champion Troy Corser on a Suzuki was fourth. 2006 gave the feeling that the Superbike World Championship was 'back' following the years of decline in 2003 and 2004.

=== 2007 ===
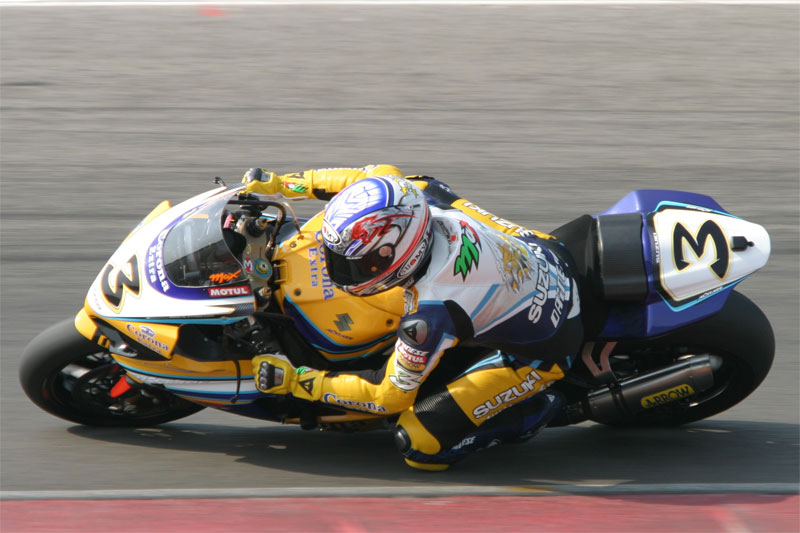
Max Biaggi riding his Alstare Suzuki GSX-R1000 K7 at Assen

With MotoGP machines reduced in capacity from 990 cc to an 800 cc maximum displacement, 1,000 cc Superbikes, both at World Championship and top national championships (AMA Superbike and British Superbike) become the largest capacity bikes (but not the most powerful) being road raced in 2007. While superbikes remained two or more seconds per lap slower than MotoGP bikes at most tracks where both raced, they had equal or more power. Troy Bayliss attempted to defend his title, riding once again a Ducati 999. Though 999 production ended in 2006 and the bike was replaced by the Ducati 1098, Ducati produced 150 limited-edition 999s at an elevated race specification to satisfy homologation requirements. Bayliss' main rivals in his title defense included former MotoGP rider Max Biaggi riding a Suzuki, 2004 champion James Toseland riding a Honda and Noriyuki Haga riding a Yamaha.

The combination of some uneventful races in MotoGP and some exciting races in SBK saw the championship's popularity increase even more.

The championship was won by James Toseland in the season's last race. His 415 points put him two points ahead of Noriyuki Haga, with former MotoGP winner Max Biaggi following with 397 points on a Suzuki.

=== 2008 ===
After introducing the Ducati 1098 in 2007 powered by a 1,099 cc v-twin engine Ducati requested that Superbike rules be changed to allow v-twins of up to 1,200 cc compete against 1,000 cc four-cylinder bikes. Ducati argued that they no longer produced a road-going 1,000 cc V-twin superbike and that the level of tuning now needed to make their 999 competitive on the race track was too expensive. Ducati said they would quit if the rules were not changed, while Alstare Suzuki team boss Francis Batta also said that his team would quit if the new rules gave Ducati an unfair advantage.

The FIM eventually included the 1,200 cc displacement limit for twins in the 2008 superbike rules. According to the new rules, twin-cylinder motorcycles would be 6 kg heavier than four-cylinder machines (168 kg to 162 kg) and would also have a 50 mm air restrictor fitted. The weight limit and the intake-restrictor size of twin machines would be updated, if needed, during the Championship, by a system analysing the race points obtained.

The new rules also changed the minimum number of bikes required to acquire homologation. For 2008 and 2009, all manufacturers, regardless of total production numbers, had to produce a minimum of 1,000 bikes to acquire homologation. From 2010 onwards, the minimum production number was increased to 3,000 bikes. In the past, smaller manufacturers were allowed to build as few as 150 bikes to meet the homologation requirements. Manufacturers took advantage of this by producing 'homologation specials'--highly tuned versions of their road bikes with performance parts designed especially for racing.

The 2008 SBK championship was dominated by Troy Bayliss of Australia, on his Ducati 1098, who concluded his season and his career with a double win at the brand new, 195-million-Euro Portimao circuit in Portugal, after which he retired.

=== 2009 ===
During the offseason, Yamaha lost Noriyuki Haga to Ducati, who signed him to replace the retired Troy Bayliss. His place was taken by 3-times AMA champion Ben Spies, who was expected to give Haga serious competition.

Ben Spies took a record 11 poles in the 14 round series and 14 wins (17 podiums) in 28 races; his main rival Haga was more consistent, finishing on the podium 19 times but winning only 8 races. 2009 also saw the debut of BMW and the return of Aprilia. Aprilia took a fourth final place in the championship with Max Biaggi, while BMW finished thirteenth with Troy Corser.

=== 2010 ===
2009 Champion Ben Spies moved to MotoGP. James Toseland returned to the championship after 2 seasons in MotoGP and took Spies place at the Sterilgarda Yamaha World Superbike team, partnered by fellow Brit Cal Crutchlow. The factory Ducati team retained their two riders.

The 2010 season started on February 28 at Phillip Island and ended on October 3 at Magny-Cours.

=== 2011 ===
The knockout system introduced for Superpole in 2009 was revised as the number of riders admitted to the first two sessions was reduced from twenty to sixteen and from sixteen to twelve respectively.

Ducati no longer competed with a factory team in 2011, after 23 seasons which had brought the marque a total of 29 riders' and manufacturers' championship titles, instead limiting its participation to privateer teams running their works bikes. Aprilia's gear-driven camshafts on its RSV4 motorcycle – which won the title in 2010 with Max Biaggi – was banned for the 2011 season.

After a dominating since season opening, Carlos Checa won his first championship and Ducati's 17th manufacturer title.

=== 2012 ===
The season saw the number of complete motorcycles in use limited to one per rider; this meant that the rules allowing bike changes during a race (flag-to-flag) were cancelled.

Aprilia rider Max Biaggi clinched his second SBK championship, pipping Kawasaki rider Tom Sykes by just half a point. Marco Melandri won more races than both Biaggi and Sykes this season but failing to score points in 5 of the last 6 races cost him the title.

=== 2013 ===
The season saw the number of riders per row on the starting grid reduced from four to three; the knockout system in use for Superpole was revised as the number of riders admitted to the first and to the third session changed from sixteen to fifteen and from eight to nine respectively. In addition, pit stops with tyre changes were introduced in order to avoid races to be interrupted due to variable weather conditions.

Kawasaki rider Tom Sykes was crowned champion after obtaining the third-place finish he needed to secure the title victory at Jerez.

=== 2014 ===
The season saw the revision of the Superpole format: riders placed from eleventh to twentieth position in the combined classification of the first three practice sessions were admitted to Superpole 1, then the two fastest SP1 riders progressed to Superpole 2, which finally awarded the pole position, joining the ten fastest riders of practice.

Aprilia's Sylvain Guintoli became the Superbike World Champion at the last race, prevailing over Tom Sykes by six points in the standings. But both Marco Melandri and Tom Sykes won more races than Sylvain Guintoli this season. With Sykes winning 8 and Melandri 6 compared to Guintoli's 5.

=== 2015 ===
Jonathan Rea became 2015 World Superbike Champion riding a Kawasaki.

=== 2016 ===
Jonathan Rea won his second consecutive Superbike World Championship title at the first race of the last round at Losail, while Kawasaki had secured the manufacturers' title at the previous event at Jerez. Chaz Davies won the most races this season with Davies winning 11 races to Rea's 9.

After changes in the standard weekend timetable, the first race, which was previously run on Sunday along with the second one, was scheduled to be held on Saturday.

=== 2017 ===
The season saw the revision of the starting grid format for the second race, which was previously based on qualifying results for both races: riders placed from fourth to ninth in Race 1 were promoted to the first two rows for Race 2; then the third, the second and the winner followed on the third row; the remaining riders were sorted from the tenth grid slot onwards according to Superpole results.

Jonathan Rea won his third Superbike world title for Kawasaki, by winning the Magny-Cours Race 1. His victory gave him an unassailable lead with five races remaining.

The season was marred by the death of Honda rider and former MotoGP World Champion Nicky Hayden, who succumbed to injuries sustained in a pedal-cycling accident near Rimini, Italy, on 22 May.

=== 2018 ===
Jonathan Rea won his fourth Superbike world title for Kawasaki.

2018 was the final season run with the two-race format, as a three-race format was introduced for 2019.

=== 2019 ===
A new race format was introduced for the 2019 season. As in 2018, two normal length races (Race 1 and Race 2) were held – one each on Saturday and Sunday (Friday and Saturday in Qatar). A third race, a ten lap sprint named the Superpole Race, was held on the final morning of the weekend prior to Race 2. The starting grids for Race 1 and the Superpole Race were determined by a single 25-minute Superpole Qualifying session. The grid for Race 2 featured the top nine riders in the Superpole Race in the order in which they finished followed by the remaining riders sorted by their Superpole Qualifying times.

Jonathan Rea won his fifth Superbike world title for Kawasaki.

=== 2020 ===
In a season shortened by the Covid pandemic, Jonathan Rea won his sixth Superbike world title for Kawasaki.

=== 2021 ===
The championship was won by Toprak Razgatlıoğlu.

=== 2022 ===
Álvaro Bautista won his first championship and Ducati's 18th manufacturer title.

=== 2023 ===
On 23 April 2023, Ducati reached 400 victories in Superbike and Álvaro Bautista won 40 victories.
Álvaro Bautista won his second Superbike world title for Ducati and Ducati won its 19th manufacturer title.

=== 2024 ===
Jonathan Rea moved from Kawasaki to Yamaha. Nicolò Bulega, 2023 Supersport champion, makes his debut at the Superbike World Championship. Toprak Razgatlıoğlu moves from Yamaha to BMW. On March 24, 2024, Álvaro Bautista reached 60 victories with Ducati. On 1 April 2024, Formula One Owners Liberty Media Bought 86% of Dorna Sport which owns MotoGP and World Superbikes. Toprak Razgatlıoğlu, who had previously won the championship in 2021, won his second Superbike world title.
Ducati won its 20th manufacturer title.

Several regulatory changes were introduced for the 2024 season. WorldSBK adopted fuel containing at least 40% sustainable components, the WorldSBK class started testing fuel-flow measurement systems, with two motorcycles from each manufacturer required to record data during practice sessions and races ahead of a planned implementation in 2025. Changes to the race weekend schedule included shorter Free Practice 3 and Sunday warm-up sessions. The regulations also introduced revised penalties for engine allocation infringements and optional team championship licences, with unlicensed teams ineligible to score team championship points

=== 2025 ===
Jonathan Rea declared his retirement at the end of this season. Toprak Razgatlıoğlu won his third Superbike world title. Ducati won its 21st Superbike world title. On 19 October 2025, Nicolò Bulega achieved 20 Superbike victories. While Toprak Razgatlıoğlu left Superbike at the end of this season as world champion, moving on to MotoGP with Yamaha for 2026. Toprak Razgatlıoğlu has achieved 78 Superbike victories, second only to Jonathan Rea in the all-time Superbike wins list.

A big change for the 2025 season was the mandatory introduction of fuel flowmeters, all six manufacturers began the campaign with a fuel-flow limit of 47 kg/h, with a tolerance of 2 grams per lap and potential penalties for exceeding the permitted limit. Under the concession system, a manufacturer leading its closest rival by at least 12 concession points could have its fuel-flow limit reduced by 0.5 kg/h at a concession checkpoint, held every two rounds. Conversely, manufacturers eligible for concessions could opt to increase their fuel-flow limit by 0.5 kg/h. No engine rev limits were imposed by the FIM as part of these regulations.

=== 2026 ===
Jonathan Rea, the multiple champion and record-holder for victories, briefly returns to the championship as a test and replacement rider for Honda, racing at the Portimao Circuit in Portugal, at TT Circuit Assen in the Netherlands and at Donington Park in England. On 14 June 2026, Nicolò Bulega achieved 40 Superbike victories. On July 4, 2026, Ducati celebrates its centenary.

== Riders ==
Riders from all over the world compete in the Superbike World Championship. The championship is perhaps most closely followed in Italy because of Ducati and the United Kingdom where superbike racing has been the most popular form of motorcycle racing. National-championship superbike racing is conducted in several countries, including the United States, the UK and Japan. Riders from Australia and the United States have traditionally been successful in the world championship. No American rider had won a race since Colin Edwards won the 2002 championship until Ben Spies joined the series in 2009, but no Americans competed in the series between 2003 and 2007.

British rider Carl Fogarty had long been the most successful rider in the championship's history, winning the championship four times, and amassing a total of 59 race wins. Jonathan Rea cemented his overtaking of Fogarty in the history books by winning his fifth consecutive world championship title in 2019, amassing a new record number of race wins, too. Rea went on to win his sixth title in 2020.

Many riders successful in the Superbike World Championship have gone on to MotoGP, such as 2002 champion Colin Edwards, 2007 champion James Toseland, and 2005 runner-up Chris Vermeulen. The championship has seen several former MotoGP riders move to it, usually after failing to earn competitive rides. The 2008 field includes five former MotoGP winners: Max Biaggi, Carlos Checa and Makoto Tamada all raced exclusively in MotoGP before joining SBK, while Troy Bayliss, Noriyuki Haga, and Régis Laconi had alternating spells in both.

Except for Frenchman Raymond Roche, who won the championship in 1990, all Superbike World Champions had been native English speakers, until Max Biaggi won the championship in 2010 and 2012 and also 2011 champion Carlos Checa and 2014 champion Sylvain Guintoli becoming the second Frenchman to take the title. Italian riders Davide Tardozzi and Marco Lucchinelli won the first two races of the series, and Frenchman Adrien Morillas was also victorious in 1988; Germany had to wait for Max Neukirchner to achieve this in 2008, although Austrian Andreas Meklau was the first German-speaker to win a race, in 1993. Spain's first race winner was Ruben Xaus in 2001.

== Superbike motorcycles ==
Superbike racing motorcycles are derived from standard production models. In the past, however, manufacturers took advantage of loopholes in the rules to create "homologation specials" — motorcycles with low production numbers made especially for racing.

Current SBK motorcycle manufacturers:

- Bimota: YB4EI, SB8R, BB3, KB998
- BMW: S1000RR, M1000RR
- Ducati: 851, 888, 916, 996, 998, 999, 1098, 1198, 1199 Panigale R, V4R Panigale
- Honda: RC30, RC45, RC51, CBR1000RR
- Kawasaki: GPX750R, ZXR750, ZX-7RR, ZX-10R
- Yamaha: YZF750, YZF-R7, YZF-R1

Former SBK motorcycle manufacturers:

- Aprilia: RSV Mille R, RSV4
- Benelli: Tornado Tre 900
- Erik Buell Racing: 1190RX
- MV Agusta: MV Agusta F4
- Petronas: FP1
- Suzuki: GSX-R750, GSX-R1000
2007 World Superbike motorcycles by all 5 participating manufacturers
Lorenzo Lanzi riding the Ducati 999F07

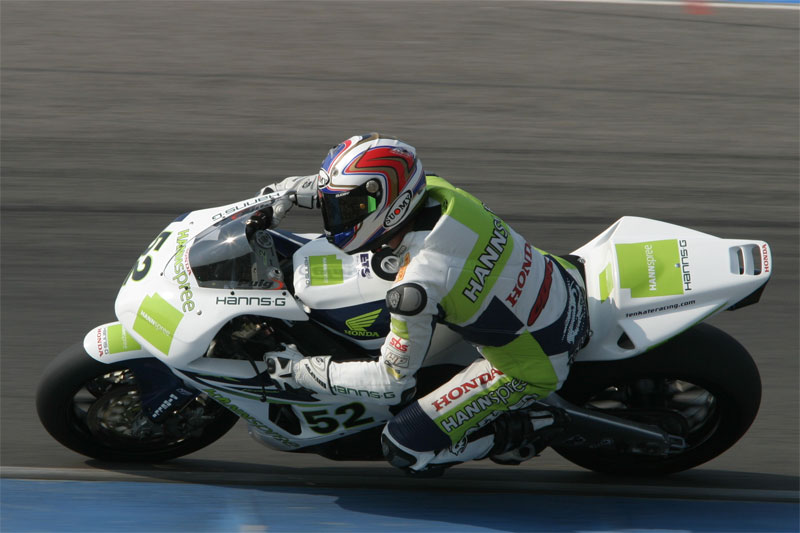
James Toseland riding the Honda CBR1000RR

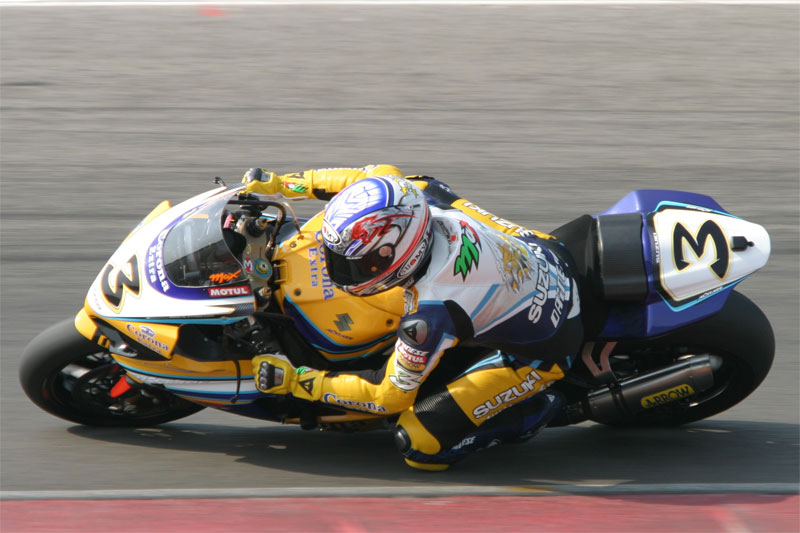
Max Biaggi riding the Suzuki GSX-R1000 K7

Noriyuki Haga riding the Yamaha YZF-R1

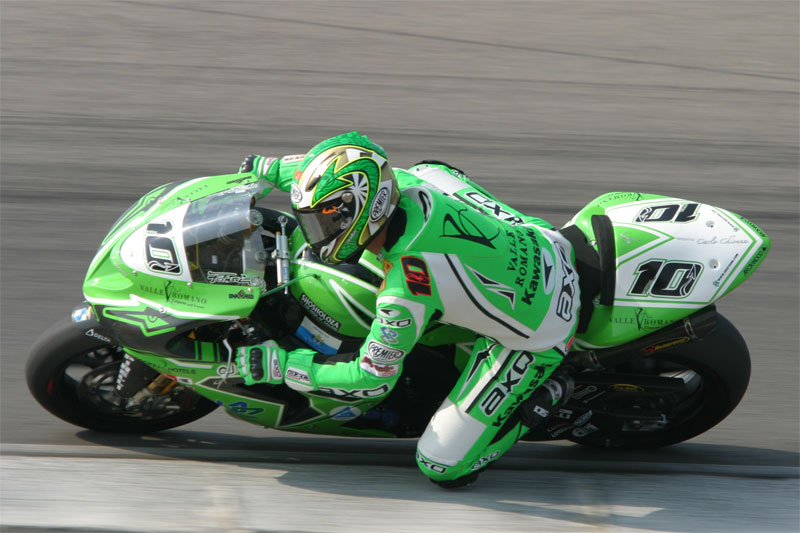
Fonsi Nieto riding the Kawasaki ZX-10R

== Race weekend ==
Up to 2013 season

- Friday
  - 1st free practice (60 minutes) and 1st qualifying (60 minutes)
- Saturday
  - 2nd qualifying (60 minutes) and 2nd free practice (60 minutes)

The times of first and second qualifying are combined and the 15 fastest riders qualify for Superpole. The rest receive a grid position based on lap time, starting with 16th. To qualify for the race, riders must record a lap time no longer than 107% of the time recorded by the pole-position rider.
- Superpole

  - The first 15 riders of the qualifying practice on the track participate in a Knockout session.
  - All sessions are 12 minutes each, with a seven-minute interval between sessions.
    - The first round consists of 15 riders. The slowest three riders are eliminated and start 13th to 15th.
    - The second round consists of 12 riders. The slowest three riders start 10th to 12th.
    - The final round consists of nine riders. The top nine are set in this session.
  - All times for riders advancing are wiped, requiring advancing riders to set a best time in every Superpole session in which they participate.

Starting grid.

- Sunday
  - Warm-up (20 minutes) Race 1 and Race 2

Race distance must be from a minimum of 90 km to a maximum of 110 km.

From 2019 onwards:

- Friday
  - 1st free practice (50 minutes) and 2nd free practice (50 minutes)
- Saturday
  - 3rd free practice (30 minutes)
  - Superpole (25 minutes)
    - Sets the starting positions for Race 1 and the Superpole Race
    - To qualify for the race, riders must record a lap time no longer than 107% of the time recorded by the pole-position rider.
  - Race 1
- Sunday
  - Warm-up (15 minutes)
  - Superpole Race
    - Ten lap race.
    - Top 9 finishers set their grid position for Race 2; positions from 10th onwards set from Saturday's Superpole.
  - Race 2

== Scoring system ==
Current points system
| Position | 1 | 2 | 3 | 4 | 5 | 6 | 7 | 8 | 9 | 10 | 11 | 12 | 13 | 14 | 15 |
|---|---|---|---|---|---|---|---|---|---|---|---|---|---|---|---|
| Points | 25 | 20 | 16 | 13 | 11 | 10 | 9 | 8 | 7 | 6 | 5 | 4 | 3 | 2 | 1 |

- For the Manufacturers' Championship, only the highest finishing motorcycle by a particular manufacturer is awarded the points for that position, as in MotoGP and most other forms of motorcycle racing.

Superpole points system
| Position | 1 | 2 | 3 | 4 | 5 | 6 | 7 | 8 | 9 |
|---|---|---|---|---|---|---|---|---|---|
| Points | 12 | 9 | 7 | 6 | 5 | 4 | 3 | 2 | 1 |

== Support classes ==
=== Supersport World Championship ===
Supersport World Championship has been a support class to the Superbike World Championship since 1990.

To be eligible for World Supersport, a motorcycle must have a four stroke engine of between 400 and 600 cc for four cylinder, 500 and 675 cubic centimetres for triples and between 600 and 750 cc for twins and must satisfy the FIM homologation requirements. World Supersport regulations are much tighter than in World Superbike. The chassis of a supersport machine must remain largely as production, while engine tuning is possible, but tightly regulated. As in world superbike a control tyre is used, although supersport regulations dictate that the tyres must be road legal and therefore race slicks are not allowed.

A World Supersport race takes place at every World Superbike round.

=== FIM Superstock 1,000 Cup ===
The FIM Superstock 1,000 Cup was a support class to the Superbike World Championship at the European rounds. Motorcycles with the same displacement as superbikes can run in superstock 1000 (though 1,200 cc twins were allowed for 2007). Superstock rules are much more restrictive and most components on the bike remain stock. The bikes run on Grooved Pirelli tyres. The Superstock 1000 championship is open to riders up to 24 years of age.

=== European Superstock 600 Championship ===
The Superstock 600 European Championship was a support class to the Superbike World Championship. The championship uses 600 cc production motorcycles and is reserved for riders between 15 and 24 years of age. Same rules as Superstock 1000 apply, but the series is organized by FIM Europe.

== Video games ==
As the World Superbike Championship has grown in popularity over the years, video games have been developed to incorporate its growing fan base. Originally EA Sports held the licence to produce SBK videos games until 2001 when they discontinued the series. The Italian developer Milestone developed the three video games: Superbike World Championship, Superbike 2000 and Superbike 2001 published by EA Sports, which were very successful. Milestone, from 2007 to 2012, developed other games in the series published by Black Bean Games, deal signed in 2006 via RTR Sports. From 2007 to 2012 are published: SBK-07: Superbike World Championship, SBK-08: Superbike World Championship, SBK-09: Superbike World Championship, SBK X: Superbike World Championship, SBK 2011: FIM Superbike World Championship and SBK Generations.

== See also ==
- Superbike World Championship records
