= List of PlayStation Vita games (M–O) =

== Games list (M–O) ==
There are currently 1731 games across the lists of PlayStation Vita games.

For a chronological list, click the sort button in any of the available region's columns. Games dated December 17, 2011 (JP), February 15, 2012 (NA), and February 22, 2012 (EU) are launch titles of each region respectively.

Title	Genre(s)	Developer(s)	Publisher(s)	Release date			PS TV compat.	Ref.
Title	Genre(s)	Developer(s)	Publisher(s)	North America	Europe	Japan	PS TV compat.	Ref.
M3: Sono Kuroki Hagane: Mission Memento Mori	Action	Bandai Namco Games, Netchubiyori	Bandai Namco Games	Unreleased	Unreleased	Nov 20, 2014	Yes	
Machinarium	Adventure	Amanita Design	JP: Playism; WW: Amanita Design	Mar 26, 2013	May 1, 2013	Dec 24, 2014	Yes	
Macross Delta Scramble	Action	Artdink	Bandai Namco Entertainment	Unreleased	Unreleased	Oct 20, 2016	Yes	
Madden NFL 13	Sports	HB Studios	EA Sports	Aug 28, 2012	Aug 31, 2012	Unreleased	Yes	
Magical Beat	Rhythm, puzzle	Arc System Works	Arc System Works	Jun 17, 2014	Jan 28, 2015	Dec 12, 2013	Yes	
Magic-kyun! Renaissance	Otome game	HuneX	Broccoli	Unreleased	Unreleased	Sep 21, 2016	Yes	
Mahjong Carnival	Mahjong	Creobit	4HIT LTD	Sep 22, 2015	Jul 22, 2015	Unreleased	No	
Mahjong Fight Club: Shinsei Zenkoku Taisen-ban	Mahjong	Konami	Konami	Unreleased	Unreleased	Dec 17, 2011	Yes	
Mahjong Gold	Mahjong	Creobit	4HIT LTD	Sep 2, 2014	Jul 16, 2014	Unreleased	Yes	
Mahjong Royal Towers	Mahjong	Creobit	8 Floor Games	Dec 10, 2013	Jul 24, 2013	Unreleased	Yes	
Mahjong World Contest	Mahjong	Creobit	8 Floor Games	Apr 1, 2014	Jan 8, 2014	Unreleased	Yes	
Mahō Shōjo Taisen Zanbatsu	Action	Galat Games	Galat Games	Unreleased	Unreleased	Mar 27, 2014	Yes	
Mahōka Kōkō no Rettōsei: Out of Order	Action role-playing	Witchcraft	Bandai Namco Games	Unreleased	Unreleased	Dec 25, 2014	Yes	
Maid-san wo Migi ni: Shooting Star	Platform	Platine Dispositif	Mediascape	Unreleased	Unreleased	Jun 24, 2021	No	
Maison de Maou	Tower defense	Petit Depotto	Playism	Unreleased	Unreleased	Jul 11, 2016	No	
Majo Koi Nikki: Dragon×Caravan	Visual novel	Qoobrand	Kaga Create	Unreleased	Unreleased	Dec 24, 2015	Yes	
Making * Lovers	Visual novel	HookSoft	NekoNyan Ltd.	Unreleased	Unreleased	Jul 25, 2017	No	
Maldita Castilla EX	Platform	Locomalito	Abylight Studios	Nov 9, 2017	Nov 9, 2017	Unreleased	Yes	
Malicious Rebirth	Action	Alvion	Alvion	Oct 8, 2013	Oct 9, 2013	Nov 22, 2012	Yes	
Maliya	Card game	Arrayansoft	Arrayansoft	Mar 29, 2016	Unreleased	Unreleased	No	
Manga Kakeru	Application	Granzella	Granzella	Unreleased	Unreleased	Jan 26, 2018	Yes	
Marginal 4: Idol of Supernova	Otome game	Rejet, Otomate	Idea Factory	Unreleased	Unreleased	Nov 13, 2014	Yes	
Marginal 4: Road to Galaxy	Otome game; Rhythm	Rejet, Otomate	Idea Factory	Unreleased	Unreleased	May 25, 2017	Yes	
Maru Gōkaku! Tatsuken Shiken Heisei 27-nendo-ban	Application	Media5	Media5	Unreleased	Unreleased	Aug 20, 2015	Yes	
Mary Skelter: Nightmares	Dungeon crawler	Compile Heart	Compile Heart (JP); Idea Factory (NA/EU)	Sep 19, 2017	Sep 22, 2017	Oct 16, 2016	Yes	
Mecho Tales	Platform	Arcade Distillery	Arcade Distillery	Sep 19, 2017	Unreleased	Unreleased	No	
Mecho Wars: Desert Ashes	Strategy	Arcade Distillery	Arcade Distillery	Nov 20, 2018	Unreleased	Unreleased	No	
Medieval Defenders	Tower defense	Creobit	4HIT LTD	Apr 14, 2015	Mar 4, 2015	Unreleased	No	
MegaTagmension Blanc + Neptune VS Zombies	Action	Tamsoft	Compile Heart (JP); Idea Factory International (NA/EU)	Apr 26, 2016	Apr 29, 2016	Oct 15, 2015	Yes	
Meiji Tokyo Renka Full Moon	Otome game	HuneX	Broccoli	Unreleased	Unreleased	Aug 25, 2016	Yes	
Meikyuu Cross Blood: Infinity	Dungeon crawler	Experience Inc.	CyberFront	Unreleased	Unreleased	Apr 25, 2013	Yes	
Meikyuu Cross Blood: Infinity Ultimate (Note: Update for Meikyuu Cross Blood: Infinity.)	Dungeon crawler	Experience Inc.	5pb.	Unreleased	Unreleased	Aug 28, 2014	Yes	
MeiQ	Puzzle	Planet G	Planet G	Unreleased	Unreleased	Oct 31, 2013	No	
MeiQ: Labyrinth of Death	Dungeon crawler	Compile Heart	Compile Heart (JP); Idea Factory (NA/EU)	Sep 13, 2016	Sep 16, 2016	Dec 17, 2015	Yes	
Mekabolt	Puzzle-platform	Ratalaika Games	Ratalaika Games	Aug 21, 2019	Aug 21, 2019	Aug 22, 2019	Yes	
Mekorama	Puzzle	Ratalaika Games	Rainy Frog	Mar 26, 2020	Mar 26, 2020	Mar 23, 2020	No	
Mell Kiss	Visual novel	Giga	Giga	Unreleased	Unreleased	Sep 26, 2019	No	
Melty Moment	Visual novel	Hooksoft	Piacci	Unreleased	Unreleased	Dec 17, 2015	Yes	
Memories Off 6 Complete	Visual novel	5pb.	5pb.	Unreleased	Unreleased	Jun 27, 2013	Yes	
Memories Off: Innocent Fille	Visual novel	5pb.	5pb.	Unreleased	Unreleased	Mar 29, 2018	Yes	
Memories Off: Innocent Fille for Dearest	Visual novel	5pb.	5pb.	Unreleased	Unreleased	Mar 28, 2019	Yes	
Memories Off: Yubikiri no Kioku	Visual novel	5pb.	5pb.	Unreleased	Unreleased	Jun 27, 2013	Yes	
Men's Room Mayhem	Arcade	Sawfly Studios	Ripstone	May 21, 2013	May 22, 2013	Unreleased	No	
Mercenary Kings: Reloaded Edition	Shoot 'em up	Tribute Games	Tribute Games	Feb 6, 2018	Feb 6, 2018	Unreleased	Yes	
Metagal	Platform-Shooter	Ratalaika Games	Ratalaika Games	Mar 27, 2019	Mar 27, 2019	Mar 27, 2019	Yes	
Metal Gear Solid 2: Sons of Liberty HD Edition	Action-adventure, stealth	Kojima Productions; Armature Studio; Aspect Co.	Konami	Aug 21, 2012	Aug 21, 2012	Jul 17, 2012	No	
Metal Gear Solid 3: Snake Eater HD Edition	Action-adventure, stealth	Kojima Productions; Armature Studio; Aspect Co.	Konami	Aug 21, 2012	Aug 21, 2012	Jul 17, 2012	No	
Metal Max Xeno	Role-playing	Kadokawa Games, Cattle Call, 24Frame	Kadokawa Games	Unreleased	Unreleased	Apr 19, 2018	Yes	
Metal Slug 3	Run and gun	SNK, Code Mystics	SNK	Mar 24, 2015	Apr 29, 2015	May 14, 2015	Yes (1-2 players)	
Metrico	Puzzle-platform	Digital Dreams	Digital Dreams	Aug 5, 2014	Aug 6, 2014	Unreleased	No	
Metropolis: Lux Obscura	Puzzle	Ktulhu Solutions	Sometimes You	Apr 4, 2018	Apr 4, 2018	Unreleased	No	
Michael Jackson: The Experience	Rhythm	Ubisoft Shanghai	Ubisoft	Feb 15, 2012	Feb 22, 2012	Dec 17, 2011	Europe only	
Midnight Deluxe	Puzzle	Petite Games; Ratalaika Games	Ratalaika Games	Mar 6, 2018	Mar 7, 2018	Unreleased	No	
Mikagami Sumika no Seifuku Katsudō	Visual novel	Prekano	Entergram	Unreleased	Unreleased	May 24, 2018	Yes	
Miku Miku Hockey 2.0 (Note: A trial version titled Miku Miku Hockey was distributed to Japanese PlayStation Plus subscribers from September 10 to November 19, 2013. The full commercial release, Miku Miku Hockey 2.0, followed on February 13, 2014.)	Sports	Sony Computer Entertainment	Sony Computer Entertainment	Unreleased	Unreleased	Feb 13, 2014	No	
Miles & Kilo	Platform	Four Horses	Four Horses	Oct 29, 2019	Oct 29, 2019	Oct 29, 2019	Yes	
Milo's Quest	Puzzle	Ratalaika Games	Ratalaika Games	Jan 29, 2020	Jan 29, 2020	Jan 29, 2020	Yes	
Mind Maze	Puzzle	Sometimes You	Sometimes You	Jul 20, 2021	Jul 20, 2021	Unreleased	No	
Minecraft	Sandbox	4J Studios	Sony Computer Entertainment	Oct 14, 2014	Oct 15, 2014	Oct 29, 2014	Yes	
Minna de Spelunker Z	Action-adventure	Tozai Games	Square Enix	Unreleased	Unreleased	May 21, 2015	Yes	
Minutes	Puzzle	Red Phantom Games	Red Phantom Games	Feb 10, 2015	Nov 5, 2014	Unreleased	Yes	
Mind Zero	Dungeon crawler	Acquire; ZeroDiv	JP: GungHo Online Entertainment; WW: Aksys Games	May 27, 2014	May 28, 2014	Aug 1, 2013	Yes	
Miracle Girls Festival	Rhythm	Sega	Sega	Unreleased	Unreleased	Dec 17, 2015	Yes	
Mixups by POWGI	Puzzle	Lightwood Games	Lightwood Games	Feb 20, 2019	Unreleased	Unreleased	No	
MLB 12: The Show	Sports	San Diego Studio	Sony Computer Entertainment	Mar 6, 2012	Mar 7, 2012	Unreleased	No	
MLB 13: The Show	Sports	San Diego Studio	Sony Computer Entertainment	Mar 5, 2013	Mar 6, 2013	Unreleased	Yes	
MLB 14: The Show	Sports	San Diego Studio	Sony Computer Entertainment	Apr 1, 2014	Apr 2, 2014	Unreleased	Yes	
MLB 15: The Show	Sports	San Diego Studio	Sony Computer Entertainment	Mar 31, 2015	Apr 1, 2015	Apr 9, 2015	Yes	
Mobile Suit Gundam: Extreme VS-Force	Action	Bandai Namco Entertainment	Bandai Namco Entertainment	Jul 12, 2016	Jul 12, 2016	Dec 23, 2015	Yes	
Mochi Mochi Boy	Puzzle	Pixelteriyaki	Ratalaika Games	Jul 16, 2019	Jul 16, 2019	Unreleased	No	
ModNation Racers: Road Trip	Racing	San Diego Studio	Sony Computer Entertainment	Feb 15, 2012	Feb 22, 2012	Unreleased	No	
Moe Moe Daisensou Gendaibaan Plus Plus	Turn-based strategy	SystemSoft Alpha	SystemSoft Alpha	Unreleased	Unreleased	Jul 26, 2012	Yes	
Moe Moe Niji Taisen (Ryoku) 3	Turn-based strategy	SystemSoft Alpha	SystemSoft Alpha	Unreleased	Unreleased	Feb 16, 2017	Yes	
Mou, Sou Suru Shikanai!	Puzzle	Nihon Kogakuin College of Hachioji Development Team	Grasshopper Manufacture	Unreleased	Unreleased	June 21, 2012	No	
Mōjūtachi to Ohime-sama	Otome game	Otomate, Design Factory	Idea Factory	Unreleased	Unreleased	Aug 25, 2016	Yes	
Mōjūtachi to Ohime-sama: In Blossom	Otome game	Otomate, Design Factory	Idea Factory	Unreleased	Unreleased	Sep 7, 2017	Yes	
Mōjūzukai to Ōji-sama	Otome game	Otomate, Design Factory	Idea Factory	Unreleased	Unreleased	Jan 19, 2014	Yes	
Mōjūzukai to Ōji-sama: Flower & Snow	Otome game	Otomate, Design Factory	Idea Factory	Unreleased	Unreleased	Jun 11, 2015	Yes	
Monobeno: Pure Smile	Visual novel	Lose	Dramatic Create	Unreleased	Unreleased	Sep 25, 2014	Yes	
MonsterBag	Puzzle-platform	Iguanabee	Sony Computer Entertainment	Apr 7, 2015	Apr 8, 2015	Apr 1, 2015	No	
Monster Hunter Frontier G •Monster Hunter Frontier G6 •Monster Hunter Frontier G7 •Monster Hunter Frontier G8 •Monster Hunter Frontier G9 •Monster Hunter Frontier Z	Action role-playing	Capcom	Capcom	Unreleased	Unreleased	Aug 13, 2014	Yes	
Monster Monpiece	Card battle	Compile Heart	Compile Heart	May 27, 2014	Jun 4, 2014	Jan 24, 2013	North America only	
Monster Radar	Adventure	Sony Computer Entertainment	Sony Computer Entertainment	Unreleased	Unreleased	Dec 17, 2011	No	
Monster Radar Plus (Note: Update for Monster Radar.)	Adventure	Sony Computer Entertainment	Sony Computer Entertainment	Unreleased	Unreleased	Nov 21, 2012		
The Mooseman	Adventure	Morteshka	EastAsiaSoft	Jan 5, 2022	Jan 5, 2022	Jan 5, 2022	No	
MOP: Operation Cleanup	Runner	EnsenaSoft	EnsenaSoft	May 10, 2016	Unreleased	Unreleased	Yes	
Mortal Kombat	Fighting	NetherRealm Studios	Warner Bros. Interactive Entertainment	May 1, 2012	May 4, 2012	Unreleased	No	
Moshi, Kono Sekai ni Kamisama ga Iru to suru Naraba	Otome game	Rejet	Rejet	Unreleased	Unreleased	Feb 25, 2016	Yes	
MotoGP 13	Racing	Milestone srl	Black Bean Games	Aug 5, 2014	Jun 19, 2013	Unreleased	No	
MotoGP 14	Racing	Milestone srl	Black Bean Games (EU); Bandai Namco Games (NA)	Nov 4, 2014	Jul 4, 2014	Unreleased	No	
MotorStorm: RC	Racing	Evolution Studios	Sony Computer Entertainment	Mar 6, 2012	Feb 22, 2012	Mar 29, 2013	Yes	
Motto nee, Chanto Shiyou yo! Plus	Visual novel	Candy Soft	NetRevo	Unreleased	Unreleased	May 29, 2014	Yes	
Mousecraft	Puzzle	Crunching Koalas, Curve Studios	Curve Digital	Jul 8, 2014	Jul 9, 2014	Feb 3, 2016	Yes	
Mr. Pumpkin Adventure	Puzzle	CottonGame Network Tech-nology	Flyhigh Works (JP); Qubic Games (NA)	Jul 11, 2017	Unreleased	Jun 7, 2016	No	
Ms. Germinator	Puzzle	Creat Studios	Creat Studios	Aug 20, 2013	Aug 14, 2013	Unreleased	Yes	
MUD: FIM Motocross World Championship	Racing	Milestone srl	Black Bean Games	Feb 26, 2013	Oct 12, 2012	Unreleased	Yes	
The Muppets Movie Adventures	Action-adventure	Virtual Toys	Sony Computer Entertainment	Sep 1, 2015	Nov 7, 2014	Unreleased	No	
Muramasa Rebirth	Action role-playing	Vanillaware	Marvelous AQL (JP); Aksys Games (NA/EU)	Jun 25, 2013	Oct 16, 2013	Mar 28, 2013	Yes	
Murasaki Baby	Puzzle	Ovosonico	Sony Computer Entertainment	Sep 16, 2014	Sep 17, 2014	Sep 25, 2014	No	
Murasaki Mist: Akara's Journey	Action role-playing	Hollow Games	Hollow Games	Mar 15, 2016	Unreleased	Unreleased	Yes	
Mushroom Heroes	Platform	Hidden Trap	Hidden Trap, EastAsiaSoft	Jul 22, 2020	Jul 22, 2020	Jul 30, 2020	No	
Musou Stars	Hack and slash	Omega Force	Koei Tecmo	Unreleased	Unreleased	Mar 30, 2017	Yes	
Musynx	Rhythm	I-Inferno	PM Studios	Jun 19, 2018	Unreleased	Unreleased	No	
Mutant Mudds Deluxe	Platform	Renegade Kid	Renegade Kid	Dec 17, 2013	Unreleased	Unreleased	Yes	
Mutant Mudds: Super Challenge	Platform	Renegade Kid	Nighthawk Interactive	Jul 26, 2016	Aug 3, 2016	Unreleased	No	
Muv-Luv	Visual novel	âge	JP: 5pb.; WW: PQube	Jun 12, 2018	Jun 8, 2018	Jan 21, 2016	Yes	
Muv-Luv Alternative	Visual novel	âge	JP: 5pb.; WW: PQube	Jun 12, 2018	Jun 8, 2018	Jan 21, 2016	Yes	
Muv-Luv Alternative: Total Eclipse - Teito Moyu	Visual novel	âge	5pb.	Unreleased	Unreleased	Jan 21, 2016	Yes	
MXGP The Official Motocross Videogame	Racing	Milestone srl	Milestone srl (EU); Bandai Namco Games (NA)	Nov 18, 2014	Mar 28, 2014	Unreleased	Yes	
My Aunt is a Witch	Adventure	Sometimes You	Sometimes You	Nov 25, 2020	Nov 4, 2020	Unreleased	No	
My Big Sister	Role-playing	Stranga	Ratalaika Games	May 7, 2019	Unreleased	Unreleased	No	
My Name is Mayo	Adventure	Green Lava Studios	Green Lava Studios	Nov 8, 2016	Nov 8, 2017	Unreleased	No	
My Singing Monsters	Simulation	Big Blue Bubble	Big Blue Bubble	Aug 12, 2014	Aug 13, 2014	Unreleased	No	
Mystery Chronicle: One Way Heroics	Roguelike	Spike Chunsoft	Spike Chunsoft	Sep 13, 2016	Sep 13, 2016	Jul 30, 2015	Yes	
NadeRevo!	Visual novel	Jitaku Studio	Entergram	Unreleased	Unreleased	Apr 26, 2018	Yes	
Naitei! Shūkatsu Kanzen Taisaku ES, SPI, Mensetsu	Application	Media5	Media5	Unreleased	Unreleased	Oct 31, 2013	Yes	
Nanairo Reincarnation	Visual novel	Silky's Plus Alpha	Red Flagship	Unreleased	Unreleased	Sep 17, 2015	Yes	
naspocket	Application	Sony Computer Entertainment	Sony Computer Entertainment	Unreleased	Unreleased	Oct 10, 2013	No	
Natsuiro Kokoro Log	Visual novel	Hearts	Dramatic Create	Unreleased	Unreleased	Apr 26, 2018	Yes	
Natsumegu	Visual novel	Cotton Software, Daidai Inc.	TGL	Unreleased	Unreleased	Jul 30, 2015	Yes	
Natural Doctrine	Tactical role-playing	Kadokawa Games	Kadokawa Games	Sep 30, 2014	Oct 3, 2014	Apr 3, 2014	Yes	
NAX Music Player	Application	Arc System Works	Arc System Works	Unreleased	Unreleased	Dec 5, 2012	No	
Necrosphere Deluxe	Platform	Cat Nigiri	Unties	Jan 31, 2019	May 26, 2019	Jan 31, 2019	No	
Need a packet?	Simulation	Sometimes You	Sometimes You	Jul 24, 2020	Jul 24, 2020	Unreleased	No	
Need for Speed: Most Wanted	Racing	Criterion Games	Electronic Arts	Oct 30, 2012	Nov 2, 2012	Nov 15, 2012	Yes	
Nekketsu Inō Bukatsu-tan: Trigger Kiss	Otome game	Otomate, Design Factory	Idea Factory	Unreleased	Unreleased	Oct 2, 2014	Yes	
Nekoburo CatsBlock	Puzzle	F K Digital	Arc System Works (JP); Neko Entertainment (NA/EU)	Jul 7, 2015	Jul 7, 2015	Dec 24, 2014	Yes	
Nelke to Densetsu no Renkinjutsushi Tachi ~ Aratana Daichi no Atelier ~	Role-playing	Gust	Koei Tecmo Games	Unreleased	Unreleased	Jan 31, 2019	No	
Neon Junctions	Puzzle	9 Eyes Game Studio	Ratalaika Games	Jun 4, 2019	Unreleased	Unreleased	No	
NextRev Care Manager Shiken	Educational	Media5	Media5	Unreleased	Unreleased	Jun 27, 2013	Yes	
NextRev Chūshōkigō Shindan-shi Shiken 1	Educational	Media5	Media5	Unreleased	Unreleased	Feb 7, 2013	Yes	
NextRev Chūshōkigō Shindan-shi Shiken 2	Educational	Media5	Media5	Unreleased	Unreleased	Feb 7, 2013	Yes	
NextRev Eibunhō Tettei Tokkun	Educational	Media5	Media5	Unreleased	Unreleased	Apr 26, 2012	Yes	
NextRev Eiken	Educational	Media5	Media5	Unreleased	Unreleased	Aug 29, 2013	Yes	
NextRev FP Ginō Kentei Shiken Ni-kyū	Educational	Media5	Media5	Unreleased	Unreleased	Jul 26, 2012	Yes	
NextRev FP Ginō Kentei Shiken San-kyū	Educational	Media5	Media5	Unreleased	Unreleased	Jul 26, 2012	Yes	
NextRev Gyōsei Shoshi Shiken	Educational	Media5	Media5	Unreleased	Unreleased	May 24, 2012	Yes	
NextRev Hisho Kentei Shiken	Educational	Media5	Media5	Unreleased	Unreleased	May 30, 2013	Yes	
NextRev IT Passport Shiken	Educational	Media5	Media5	Unreleased	Unreleased	Jun 28, 2012	Yes	
NextRev Jōhō Security Specialist Shiken・Network Specialist Shiken	Educational	Media5	Media5	Unreleased	Unreleased	Aug 23, 2012	Yes	
NextRev Kaigo Fukushi-shi Shiken	Educational	Media5	Media5	Unreleased	Unreleased	Oct 25, 2012	Yes	
NextRev Kihonjōhō Gijutsusha Shiken	Educational	Media5	Media5	Unreleased	Unreleased	Jun 28, 2012	Yes	
NextRev Ōyōjōhō Gijutsusha Shiken	Educational	Media5	Media5	Unreleased	Unreleased	Jun 28, 2012	Yes	
NextRev Shakai Fukushi-shi Shiken	Educational	Media5	Media5	Unreleased	Unreleased	Sep 27, 2012	Yes	
NextRev Sharō-shi Shiken	Educational	Media5	Media5	Unreleased	Unreleased	Feb 21, 2013	Yes	
NextRev Takken-shi Shiken	Educational	Media5	Media5	Unreleased	Unreleased	Aug 23, 2012	Yes	
NextRev Takken-shi Shiken 2015	Educational	Media5	Media5	Unreleased	Unreleased	May 22, 2014	Yes	
Neo Angelique: Tenshi no Namida	Otome game	Ruby Party	Idea Factory	Unreleased	Unreleased	Dec 7, 2017	Yes	
Neo Atlas 1469	Simulation	Artdink	Artdink	Unreleased	Unreleased	Oct 27, 2016	No	
Neon Chrome	Shooter	10tons	10tons	Nov 29, 2016	Nov 29, 2016	Unreleased	Yes	
Nep-Nep Connect: Chaos Chanpuru	Card battle	Compile Heart	Compile Heart	Unreleased	Unreleased	Jun 7, 2017	Yes	
Net High	Visual novel	Marvelous	Marvelous	Unreleased	Unreleased	Nov 26, 2015	Yes	
NeuroVoider	Shooter	Flying Oak Games	Flying Oak Games	Mar 15, 2018	Mar 15, 2018	Unreleased	No	
NeverEnd	Roguelike	Duck, Sometimes You	Sometimes You	Aug 25, 2017	Sep 13, 2017	Unreleased	Yes	
Neverending Nightmares	Survival horror	Infinitap Games	Infinitap Games (NA/EU); Playism (JP)	May 3, 2016	May 3, 2016	May 19, 2016	Yes	
New Game! The Challenge Stage	Visual novel	5pb.	5pb.	Unreleased	Unreleased	Jan 26, 2017	Yes	
New Little King's Story	Action role-playing	Marvelous AQL	Konami	Oct 2, 2012	Sep 27, 2012	Mar 29, 2012	Japan/Europe only	
Nicole	Dating sim	Ratalaika Games	EastAsiaSoft	Unreleased	Unreleased	Nov 24, 2020	No	
Nidhogg	Fighting	Messhof, Code Mystics	Messhof (NA/EU); Nippon Ichi Software (JP)	Oct 14, 2014	Nov 12, 2014	Feb 9, 2017	Yes	
Night Trap: 25th Anniversary Edition	Adventure	Screaming Villains	Limited Run Games	Nov 2, 2018	Unreleased	Unreleased	No	
NightCry	Survival horror	Nude Maker	Playism Games	Unreleased	Unreleased	Jan 31, 2019	Yes	
Nights of Azure	Action role-playing	Gust Co. Ltd.	Koei Tecmo	Unreleased	Unreleased	Oct 1, 2015	Yes	
Nights of Azure 2	Action role-playing	Gust Co. Ltd.	Koei Tecmo	Unreleased	Unreleased	Aug 31, 2017	Yes	
Nihilumbra	Puzzle-platform	BeautiFun Games	BeautiFun Games (NA/EU); Unity Games Japan (JP)	Jan 27, 2015	Jan 28, 2015	Apr 24, 2015	No	
Nihon Pro Mahjong Renmei Kōnin Motto Nijū-bai! Mahjong ga Tsuyoku Naru Hōhō: Hatsu Chūkyū-sha-hen	Mahjong	Kaga Create	Kaga Create	Unreleased	Unreleased	Nov 28, 2013	Yes	
Nihon Pro Mahjong Renmei Suisen Tokoton Mahjong! Joryū Pro ni Chōsen! Tetsuman Megami Special	Mahjong	Kaga Create	Kaga Create	Unreleased	Unreleased	Nov 28, 2013	Yes	
Nikoli no Puzzle V: Bijutsukan	Puzzle	Hamster Corporation	Hamster Corporation	Unreleased	Unreleased	Jun 21, 2012	Yes	
Nikoli no Puzzle V: Hashiwokakero	Puzzle	Hamster Corporation	Hamster Corporation	Unreleased	Unreleased	Aug 9, 2012	Yes	
Nikoli no Puzzle V: Heyawake	Puzzle	Hamster Corporation	Hamster Corporation	Unreleased	Unreleased	Jul 7, 2012	Yes	
Nikoli no Puzzle V: Hitori ni Shite Kure	Puzzle	Hamster Corporation	Hamster Corporation	Unreleased	Unreleased	Jul 19, 2012	Yes	
Nikoli no Puzzle V: Kakuro	Puzzle	Hamster Corporation	Hamster Corporation	Unreleased	Unreleased	Apr 19, 2012	Yes	
Nikoli no Puzzle V: Masyu	Puzzle	Hamster Corporation	Hamster Corporation	Unreleased	Unreleased	Jul 5, 2012	Yes	
Nikoli no Puzzle V: Numberlink	Puzzle	Hamster Corporation	Hamster Corporation	Unreleased	Unreleased	Sep 13, 2012	Yes	
Nikoli no Puzzle V: Nurikabe	Puzzle	Hamster Corporation	Hamster Corporation	Unreleased	Unreleased	May 24, 2012	Yes	
Nikoli no Puzzle V: Shikaku	Puzzle	Hamster Corporation	Hamster Corporation	Unreleased	Unreleased	Aug 30, 2012	Yes	
Nikoli no Puzzle V: Shugyoku No Jū-ni Puzzle	Puzzle	Hamster Corporation	Hamster Corporation	Unreleased	Unreleased	Apr 12, 2012	Yes	
Nikoli no Puzzle V: Yajilin	Puzzle	Hamster Corporation	Hamster Corporation	Unreleased	Unreleased	Sep 27, 2012	Yes	
Nil Admirari no Tenbin: Teito Genwaku Kitan	Otome game	Otomate	Idea Factory	Unreleased	Unreleased	Apr 21, 2016	Yes	
Nil Admirari no Tenbin: Kuroyuri En'yōtan	Otome game	Otomate	Idea Factory	Unreleased	Unreleased	Sep 21, 2017	Yes	
Ninja Gaiden Sigma Plus	Action-adventure	Team Ninja	Tecmo Koei	Feb 22, 2012	Feb 22, 2012	Feb 23, 2012	Yes	
Ninja Gaiden Sigma 2 Plus	Action-adventure	Team Ninja	Tecmo Koei	Feb 26, 2013	Mar 1, 2013	Feb 28, 2013	Yes	
Ninja Senki DX	Platform	Tribute Games	Tribute Games	Feb 23, 2016	Feb 23, 2016	Unreleased	Yes	
Ninja Usagimaru: Two Tails of Adventure	Platform	F K Digital	JP: Arc System Works; WW: Aksys Games	Jul 7, 2017	Jul 7, 2017	Jul 7, 2017	Yes	
Ninki Seiyū no Tsukurikata	Visual novel	MintCube	Entergram	Unreleased	Unreleased	Jan 25, 2018	Yes	
Nisekoi: Yomeiri!?	Otome game; Action	Konami	Konami	Unreleased	Unreleased	Nov 27, 2014	Yes	
No Heroes Allowed: No Puzzles Either!	Puzzle	Acquire	Sony Computer Entertainment	Apr 15, 2014	Apr 16, 2014	Dec 26, 2013	No	
Nobunaga no Yabō 201X	Puzzle	Koei Tecmo	Koei Tecmo	Unreleased	Unreleased	Jan 7, 2016	No	
Nobunaga no Yabō: Sozō	Turn-based strategy	Tecmo Koei	Tecmo Koei	Unreleased	Unreleased	May 29, 2014	Yes	
Nobunaga no Yabō: Sozō with Power-Up Kit (Note: Update for Nobunaga no Yabō: Sozō. Includes the original game and the Power-Up Kit expansion.)	Turn-based strategy	Tecmo Koei	Tecmo Koei	Unreleased	Unreleased	May 28, 2015	Yes	
Nobunaga no Yabō: Sozō - Sengoku Risshiden (Note: Stand-alone expansion for Nobunaga no Yabō: Sozō.)	Turn-based strategy	Koei Tecmo	Koei Tecmo	Unreleased	Unreleased	Mar 24, 2016	Yes	
Nobunaga no Yabō: Tendō with Power-Up Kit	Turn-based strategy	Tecmo Koei	Tecmo Koei	Unreleased	Unreleased	Sep 27, 2012	Yes	
Nobunaga no Yabō: Tenshouki with Power-Up Kit HD Version	Turn-based strategy	Koei Tecmo	Koei Tecmo	Unreleased	Unreleased	Nov 12, 2015	Yes	
Nora to Ōjo to Noraneko Heart	Visual novel	Harukaze	Harukaze	Unreleased	Unreleased	Sep 28, 2017	Yes	
Nora to Oujo to Noraneko Heart 2	Visual novel	Harukaze	Harukaze	Unreleased	Unreleased	Feb 28, 2019	No	
Norman's Great Illusion	Simulation	Sometimes You	Sometimes You	Nov 19, 2020	Nov 19, 2020	Unreleased	No	
Norn9: Last Era	Otome game	Otomate	Idea Factory	Unreleased	Unreleased	Apr 2, 2015	Yes	
Norn9: Var Commons	Otome game	Otomate	JP: Idea Factory; WW: Aksys Games	Nov 3, 2015	Nov 3, 2015	Dec 11, 2014	Yes	
Norn9: Act Tune	Otome game	Otomate	Idea Factory	Unreleased	Unreleased	Oct 6, 2016	Yes	
North	Adventure	SometimesYou	SometimesYou	Mar 6, 2018	Mar 6, 2018	Unreleased	Yes	
Nova-111	Puzzle	Funktronic Labs, Curve Studios	Curve Digital	Aug 25, 2015	Aug 26, 2015	Unreleased	Yes	
Nuclear Throne	Roguelike	Vlambeer	Vlambeer	Dec 5, 2015	Dec 5, 2015	Unreleased	Yes	
Nun Attack	Action	Frima Studio	Frima Studio	Mar 19, 2013	May 8, 2013	Unreleased	No	
Nurse Love Addiction	Visual novel	Kogado Studio Shimarisu-san Team	Kogado Studio (JP); Degica (NA/EU)	Jun 22, 2017	Jun 22, 2017	Apr 30, 2015	Yes	
Nurse Love Syndrome	Visual novel	Kogado Studio Shimarisu-san Team	Kogado Studio (JP); Degica (NA/EU)	Apr 18, 2019	Apr 18, 2019	Apr 19, 2019	Yes	
Occultic;Nine	Visual novel	5pb.	5pb.	Unreleased	Unreleased	Nov 9, 2017	Yes	
Oceanhorn: Monster of Uncharted Seas	Action-adventure	Cornfox & Bros., Engine Software	FDG Entertainment	May 17, 2017	May 17, 2017	Unreleased	Yes	
Octodad: Dadliest Catch	Adventure	Young Horses, Sickhead Games	Young Horses	May 26, 2015	May 28, 2015	Sep 11, 2015	North America/Europe only (1-2 players)	
Octalide	Action	Nihon Kogakuin College of Hachioji Development Team	Grasshopper Manufacture	Unreleased	Unreleased	June 21, 2012	No	
Oddworld: Munch's Oddysee HD	Platform	Just Add Water	Oddworld Inhabitants	Dec 16, 2014	Dec 17, 2014	Unreleased	Yes	
Oddworld: New 'n' Tasty!	Platform	Just Add Water	Oddworld Inhabitants	Jan 19, 2016	Jan 19, 2016	Unreleased	No	
Oddworld: Stranger's Wrath HD	Action-adventure	Just Add Water	Oddworld Inhabitants	Dec 18, 2012	Dec 19, 2012	Unreleased	No	
Odin Sphere: Leifthrasir	Action role-playing	Vanillaware	Atlus	Jun 7, 2016	Jun 24, 2016	Jan 14, 2016	Yes	
Ōedo Blacksmith	Business simulation	Nippon Ichi Software	Nippon Ichi Software	Unreleased	Unreleased	Nov 27, 2014	Yes	
Ōka Ranman	Action	Planet G	Planet G	Unreleased	Unreleased	Oct 31, 2013	No	
OlliOlli	Sports	Roll7	Roll7	Jan 21, 2014	Jan 22, 2014	Sep 24, 2014	Yes	
OlliOlli2: Welcome to Olliwood	Sports	Roll7	Roll7	Mar 3, 2015	Mar 4, 2015	Apr 1, 2015	Yes	
Omega Labyrinth	Roguelike	Matrix Software	D3 Publisher	Unreleased	Unreleased	Nov 19, 2015	Yes	
Omega Labyrinth Z	Roguelike	Matrix Software	D3 Publisher	Unreleased	Unreleased	Jul 6, 2017	Yes	
Omerta Code: Tycoon Kai	Otome game	Karin Chatnoir Omega	Karin Entertainment	Unreleased	Unreleased	Mar 17, 2016	Yes	
OMG HD Zombies!	Action	Laughing Jackal	Laughing Jackal	Jun 19, 2013	Jun 19, 2013	Unreleased	Yes	
Onigiri	MMORPG	CyberStep	CyberStep	Unreleased	Unreleased	Jul 21, 2017	No	
One Eyed Kutkh	Adventure	Sometimes You	Sometimes You	Mar 9, 2018	Mar 9, 2018	Unreleased	No	
One More Dungeon	Roguelike	Stately Snail; Ratalaika Games	Ratalaika Games	Dec 12, 2017	Dec 13, 2017	Unreleased	No	
One Piece: Burning Blood	Action	Spike Chunsoft	Bandai Namco Entertainment	May 31, 2016	Jun 3, 2016	Apr 21, 2016	Yes	
One Piece: Pirate Warriors 2	Action	Omega Force	Bandai Namco Games	Unreleased	Unreleased	Mar 20, 2013	Yes	
One Piece: Pirate Warriors 3	Action	Omega Force	Bandai Namco Entertainment	Aug 25, 2015	Aug 28, 2015	Mar 26, 2015	Yes	
One Piece: Unlimited World Red	Action	Ganbarion	Bandai Namco Games	Jul 15, 2014	Jun 27, 2014	Jun 12, 2014	Yes	
One Tap Hero	Platform	Coconut Island	Shanghai Kena Information Technology	This game was released exclusively in China (Mar 20, 2015)			No	
One Word By POWGI	Simulation	Lightwood Games	Lightwood Games	Dec 18, 2018	Dec 18, 2018	Unreleased	No	
Open Me!	Puzzle	PlayStation C.A.M.P.	Sony Computer Entertainment	Aug 13, 2013	Aug 14, 2013	Dec 20, 2012	No	
Operation Abyss: New Tokyo Legacy	Dungeon crawler	Experience	JP: 5pb.; WW: NIS America	Jun 9, 2015	Jun 5, 2015	Jul 25, 2014	Yes	
Operation Babel: New Tokyo Legacy	Dungeon crawler	Experience	JP: 5pb.; WW: NIS America	May 16, 2017	May 19, 2017	Apr 30, 2015	Yes	
Ore ni Hatarakette Iwaretemo Otsu HD	Life simulation	e-Smile	e-Smile	Unreleased	Unreleased	Mar 26, 2014	Yes	
Ore ni Hatarakette Iwaretemo Tori	Life simulation	e-Smile	e-Smile	Unreleased	Unreleased	Mar 17, 2016	Yes	
Oreshika: Tainted Bloodlines	Role-playing	Alfa System	Sony Computer Entertainment	Mar 3, 2015	Mar 4, 2015	Jul 17, 2014	Yes	
Oretachi ni Tsubasa wa Nai	Visual novel	Navel	5pb.	Unreleased	Unreleased	Mar 13, 2014	Yes	
Oretachi no Sekai wa Owatteiru	Visual novel	Wizard Soft	Red Entertainment	Unreleased	Unreleased	Nov 9, 2017	Yes	
Orfleurs: Koufuku no Hanataba	Otome game	A'sRing	Dramatic Create	Unreleased	Unreleased	Jan 26, 2017	Yes	
Organ Trail Complete Edition	Survival	The Men Who Wear Many Hats	The Men Who Wear Many Hats	Oct 20, 2015	Unreleased	Unreleased	Yes	
Orgarhythm	Action/rhythm	Acquire, Neilo	Acquire (JP); Xseed Games (NA/EU)	Oct 23, 2012	Jan 16, 2013	Aug 9, 2012	Yes	
Osomatsu-san The Game: Hachamecha Shuushoku Advice – Dead or Work	Otome game	Otomate	Idea Factory	Unreleased	Unreleased	Jun 29, 2017	Yes	
Othello	Puzzle	Arc System Works	Arc System Works	Unreleased	Unreleased	Aug 7, 2014	Yes	
Otoko Yūkaku	Otome game	Vridge, Hitsujigumo	D3 Publisher	Unreleased	Unreleased	Feb 19, 2015	Yes	
Otome Riron to Sono Shūhen	Visual novel	Navel	Dramatic Create	Unreleased	Unreleased	Nov 24, 2016	Yes	
Ouka Sabaki Zan	Visual novel; Adventure	Irodori	Dramatic Create	Unreleased	Unreleased	Feb 22, 2018	Yes	
Oumagatoki: Kakuriyo no Enishi	Otome game	Extend	Extend	Unreleased	Unreleased	Aug 25, 2016	Yes	
Owari no Seraph: Unmei no Hajimari	Turn-based strategy	Bandai Namco Games	Bandai Namco Games	Unreleased	Unreleased	Dec 17, 2015	Yes	
Owaru Sekai to Birthday	Visual novel	Cotton Soft	Entergram	Unreleased	Unreleased	May 11, 2017	Yes	
Ozmafia!! Vivace	Otome game	Poni-Pachet	Dramatic Create	Unreleased	Unreleased	Feb 26, 2015	Yes	

== See also ==
- List of PlayStation Vita games (A–D)
- List of PlayStation Vita games (E–H)
- List of PlayStation Vita games (I–L)
- List of PlayStation Vita games (P–R)
- List of PlayStation Vita games (S)
- List of PlayStation Vita games (T–V)
- List of PlayStation Vita games (W–Z)
