= Ride 5 =

- Developer: Milestone s.r.l
- Publisher: Milestone s.r.l
- Engine: Unreal Engine 4
- Platforms: PlayStation 5; Windows; Xbox Series X/S
- Release: WW: August 24, 2023
- Genre: Racing
- Modes: Single-player, multiplayer

Ride 5 is a 2023 motorcycle racing video game developed and published by Milestone s.r.l. It is available for Windows, PlayStation 5, and Xbox Series X/S.

== Gameplay ==
Players race motorcycles across four continents on various race tracks, including some real life ones. It is a racing game that focuses heavily on simulating real-life motorcycle handling. It supports both single-player and multi-player, including split screen.

== Development ==
Milestone s.r.l released it for Windows, PlayStation 5, and Xbox Series X/S on August 24, 2023.

== Reception ==
Ride 5 received positive reviews on Metacritic. In Japan, four critics from Famitsu gave the game a total score of 32 out of 40. TechRadar called Ride 5 "one of the best-looking PS5 games" but said it is "just not that enjoyable to play". Comparing it to the previous entry, they said the games "look and feel functionally identical" except for the addition of split screen support. They recommended it to simulation purists but said casual racing fans might dislike what they felt was a steep learning curve. Gamepressure praised its improved physics and improved AI for rival motorcyclists, but they found the other new features to be less impressive. They concluded that it is not as good as Ride 3, but the fun factor and refinements make it worth recommending. GamingBolt said racing fans will enjoy Ride 5, but they said it did not improve enough over Ride 4 to recommend it to people who already own the previous game.
