= Ride (video game) =

2015 racing video game

- Developer: Milestone srl
- Publisher: Milestone srl
- Designers: Irvin Zonca; Matteo Pezzotti
- Programmer: Salvatore Fiduccia
- Artists: Mauro Ferrari; Luca Naitza
- Engine: Graphic Engine Milestone (Ride and Ride 2); Unreal Engine 4 (Ride 3 and 4)
- Platforms: Microsoft Windows; PlayStation 3 PlayStation 4 Xbox 360; Xbox One
- Release: EU: March 27, 2015; NA: October 6, 2015
- Genre: Racing
- Modes: Single-player, multiplayer

Ride is a racing video game developed and published by Milestone. The game was released on March 27, 2015, in Europe, and on October 6, 2015, in North America for Microsoft Windows, PlayStation 3, PlayStation 4, Xbox One, and Xbox 360.

== Development ==
On September 15, 2014, Milestone announced the development of Ride, a motorcycle racing video game. The studio had previously developed racing games within the licensed series World Rally Championship, MotoGP, SBK, and MXGP.

== Reception ==
Reception

Aggregate score
Aggregator	Score
Metacritic	66/100

Review scores
Publication	Score
GamesMaster	64%
GamesTM	5/10
IGN	7/10
PlayStation Official Magazine – UK	6/10
Official Xbox Magazine (UK)	6/10

Reviewers described the game as "Forza Motorsport with bikes." It was also noted as being more accessible to newcomers than other bike games.

The game reached number 10 in the UK PS3 sales charts, and number 13 in the PS4 charts.

== Sequels ==
Ride 2 was released for PC on October 7, 2016, and for Xbox One and PlayStation 4 on February 14, 2017. It features around 200 bikes from 15 different categories (as opposed to the four categories in the original game) with additional bike customization options. Tracks include Macau and Ulster.

Ride 3 was released on November 30, 2018, for Xbox One, PS4 and Microsoft Windows. The game features 230 bikes, from 1966 to current-day. The track list was expanded to 30, including Garda Lake, Imatra, and Tenerife.

Ride 4 was announced on December 4, 2019, on the official Ride page on Facebook and was released on October 8, 2020, for Microsoft Windows, PlayStation 4, and Xbox One, for PlayStation 5 and Xbox Series X/S on January 21, 2021, and for Amazon Luna on April 8, 2021, with features dynamic weather, time of day, endurance racing and pitstops. In September 2021, a gameplay video went viral, with the wet-weather graphics looking so good that people confused it with real life. The video amassed more than 3 million views in just over a week.

== Accolades ==
It won Best Technical Achievement at the 2016 Italian Video Game Awards.

== See also ==
- List of driving and racing video games
