= Ducati: 90th Anniversary =

2016 video game

Ducati – 90th Anniversary
- Developer: Milestone
- Publisher: Milestone
- Platforms: Microsoft Windows; PlayStation 4 Xbox One
- Release: 9 June 2016
- Genre: Racing
- Modes: Single-player, multiplayer

Ducati: 90th Anniversary is a 2016 racing video game developed and published by Italian developer Milestone. It was released for Microsoft Windows, PlayStation 4, and Xbox One on 9 June 2016. The game had a retail release in Italy exclusive to GameStop shops.

== Features ==
Ducati: 90th Anniversary is a standalone spin-off title of Ride. The game pays tribute to the Italian motorcycle company Ducati, which had been founded in 1926 and rose to prominence with their racing bikes in the 1950s.

The game includes 39 motorcycles produced by Ducati, as well as several models used by Ducati's professional riders throughout the decades. The following models are featured in the game:

Model	Rider	Season
Ducati 851	(France) Raymond Roche	Winner of 1990 Superbike World Championship
Ducati 996	(United Kingdom) Carl Fogarty	Winner of 1999 Superbike World Championship
Ducati 999 F04	(United Kingdom) Neil Hodgson	Winner of 2003 Superbike World Championship
Ducati Desmodedici GP7	(Australia) Casey Stoner	Winner of 2007 MotoGP World Championship
Ducati 1098 F08	(Australia) Troy Bayliss	Winner of 2008 Superbike World Championship
Ducati Desmodedici GP15	(Italy) Andrea Dovizioso	7th in the 2015 MotoGP World Championship

The game also includes eight licensed circuits from around the world:

- (Italy) Imola
- (Argentina) Potrero de los Funes
- (Spain) Alméria
- (United States) Road America
- (France) Magny-Cours
- (United Kingdom) Donington Park
- (Japan) Sugo
- (Italy) Misano
