= Monster Energy Supercross: The Official Videogame =

Motocross video game series

- Developer: Milestone srl
- Publisher: Milestone srl
- Engine: Unreal Engine 4
- Platforms: PlayStation 4, Xbox One, Windows, Nintendo Switch, PlayStation 5, Xbox Series X/S, Google Stadia
- Release: February 13, 2018
- Genre: Racing
- Mode: Single-player

Monster Energy Supercross: The Official Videogame is a motocross video game series developed and published by Milestone srl for various platforms. The series has been released annually since early 2018 (except in 2024 when there was no game published), with the third installment launching in North America on February 4, 2020. Moving away from the international locations of Milestones' sibling motocross title MXGP, Monster Energy Supercross uses officially licensed locales and tracks of the North American-based titular series. The first game featured 17 tracks, which has increased by one in its latest incarnation.

== Series revisions ==
Monster Energy Supercross: The Official Videogame was first released on February 13, 2018, and featured the 2017 Monster Energy Supercross schedule, locale and riders. The introductory title featured a Career and a Track Editor mode. The Track Editor mode requires online access and allows the player to upload tracks for others to try. There is also a rewind-feature available during racing. Career mode allowed for racing on 250cc and 450cc Motocross Bikes. The annual revisions have added improved physics, graphics, an update of tracks and rider rosters. The third revision allowed for use of female avatars in the Rider Creation process.

== Reception ==
Monster Energy Motocross Series

Aggregate review scores As of December 1, 2023.
Game	Year	Metacritic
Monster Energy Supercross: The Official Videogame	2018	67/100
Monster Energy Supercross: The Official Videogame 2	2019	72/100
Monster Energy Supercross: The Official Videogame 3	2020	70/100
Monster Energy Supercross: The Official Videogame 4	2021	66/100
Monster Energy Supercross: The Official Videogame 5	2022	74/100
Monster Energy Supercross: The Official Videogame 6	2023	68/100
Monster Energy Supercross 25: The Official Videogame	2025	71/100

The game series has received mixed-to-positive reviews, with a consensus that developer Milestone srl has displayed their experience with racing games well with this series, and reviewers praising the fact such a niche game exists. Physics have been noted to be inconsistent, and while gameplay graphics are commended, cutscenes and menus are generally criticized as lackluster.

Reviewers of sequels have remarked on a noticeable improvement in both areas, but all releases have what Push Square reviewer Graham Banas commented as "load times [that are] absolutely brutal". In other areas, Max Hind of DirtBike Rider lauded the improved soundtrack of the second iteration, as well as the available customization, but found online features to be lacking. Steven Weber observed a relatively steep learning curve in his Gamespace review, but, like other reviewers, found this to create a more rewarding experience once mastered. As Luke Reilly of IGN elaborated on in his review of the third iteration, "[that] while it's straightforward to pick up, the learning curve is steep and, like the past two games, regardless of the handling mode it's hard to ever quite know what will cause a bail".

Other reviewers appreciated the introduction of female riders in the customization options of the third release, as well as the ability to skip tutorials if familiar with prior games.
