= Superstars V8 Racing =

2009 video game

- European box art
- Developer: Milestone
- Publisher: Black Bean Games
- Platforms: Arcade; Xbox 360; PlayStation 3 Windows
- Release: PAL: June 26, 2009; NA: October 26, 2010
- Genre: Racing
- Modes: Single-player, multiplayer

Superstars V8 Racing is a car racing video game based on the 2008 season of the Italy-based Superstars Series and available for the arcade on 17 April 2009 and ported to Xbox 360, PlayStation 3 and Windows on 26 June 2009. It is the first car racing game from developer Milestone since 2006's Evolution GT. A sequel, Superstars V8 Next Challenge, was released in 2010.
