= Alfa Romeo Racing Italiano =

2005 video game

- PlayStation 2 cover art for Alfa Romeo Racing Italiano (North American version)
- Developer: Milestone srl
- Publishers: EU: Black Bean Games; NA: Valcon Games
- Engine: RenderWare
- Platforms: PlayStation 2, Windows, Xbox
- Release: PlayStation 2, Windows: EU: May 27, 2005; NA: March 15, 2006; Xbox: EU: June 24, 2005
- Genre: Racing
- Modes: Single-player, multiplayer

Alfa Romeo Racing Italiano, known in Europe as SCAR - Squadra Corse Alfa Romeo (SCAR - Alfa Romeo Racing Team), is a racing video game for the PlayStation 2, Windows and Xbox. It was developed by Milestone srl and released in 2005.

All the cars in the game are manufactured by the Alfa Romeo motor company. While most of the tracks are in Italy, a few are in other countries like Germany and the United States. A distinguishing feature of the game is that it models driver development using a system almost identical to a role-playing video game. In addition, cars get damaged, both visibly and in performance, by collisions or by driving off course.

== Gameplay ==
=== General gameplay ===
Like many racing games, the game has a "quick race mode" and a career mode (called "dynasty mode"). The initial choices of cars and tracks in "quick race mode" are very limited; additional choices are unlocked by progress in dynasty mode". Initially, dynasty mode has a limited number of events available to enter. Placing third or better in races unlocks new races, series of races, and championships. At the same time, the game models the development of the driver using a system that is almost identical to a role-playing video game.

This elaborate system of developing the driver's experience is used to toughen up both the player and the car that they use. Experience points (referred to in the game simply as XP) are acquired for various achievements during a race, such as passing opponents, or driving a clean lap. Similar to the way that XP is lost after dying in some role-playing games, failing to finish the race cancels all XP earned in the event. When certain thresholds of XP are reached, a new driver level is achieved, and a Skill Point is awarded. These Skill Points can be used to develop driver and car. Additional Skill Points are awarded for other achievements. Some races award a skill point for beating a particular opponent for the first time. There is also a list of dynasty achievements, the completion of which awards a number of Skill Points. One such achievement, for example, is going faster than a certain speed in dynasty mode.

=== Equipment and customization ===
All cars in the game are manufactured in real life by Alfa Romeo and in any race the player always races against seven other instances of the model that they're driving. The player cannot choose their vehicle for a race, except in the "quick race" mode, and even then the opponent vehicles are all the same model. Cars assigned to beginners can go up to 110 miles per hour (177 km/h). Advanced cars, however, can go 200 miles per hour (322 km/h).

Cars cannot be customized; instead it is the driver who gets customized, although some driver customizations do affect car acceleration, handling, and damage resistance. Various achievements in the game, primarily achieving XP point levels, are rewarded with Skill Points which can be distributed across nine different categories to affect car and driver characteristics. In addition, the player wins racing gear—helmets, suits, gloves and boots—by winning "gear races" or by achieving a certain number of victories (as well as knockouts). Gear can also be earned by passing challenges. The gear a driver is wearing can be changed to further affect driver (and car) characteristics. All the gear that is unlocked in the game has a minimum level requirement. Players who do not meet the minimum requirements cannot wear the new gear until they reach that experience level. Different computer-controlled opponents in a race will have different skill points and gear, resulting in differing driving skills and endurance of both car and driver. All opponent drivers have names shown in lineups and results.

=== Driver statistics ===
During a race, the game's unique "Tiger Effect" allows players to go back in time a few seconds and try again. Typically, this is used to avoid accidents. The Tiger Effect does not automatically cause the player to avoid accidents; usually the player can at least mitigate the effects of the accident. In rare cases, the players' second attempt might actually make things worse. Tiger Effect points are decreased by units of 1.0 every time they are used. For instance, using a Tiger Effect when a player has 1.7 Tiger Effect points will reduce their Tiger Effects points to 0.7, making it useless until the counter increases itself by 0.3 points. The explanations in the game suggest that the Tiger Effect is meant to represent an expert driver's keen ability to anticipate and avoid danger.

Statistics to improve during the course of the game are named "heart", "vision", "intimidation", "handling", "acceleration", "recovery", "focus", "anticipation", and "endurance". Some of these affect the driver, and others the car, and some affect both. Building up points in "anticipation" can help increase the frequency that the player can turn back the clock and try to prevent accidents in a single race. Likewise, building up points in "heart" can help the player heal faster so that they are less likely to lose focus on the race track.

All drivers start each race with all their available driver condition points. Driving close behind another driver reduces their current driver condition points. If a driver loses all such driver condition points, the game calls this a "Knockout". Computer-controlled drivers can do the same thing to the player and each other. If the player receives a Knockout, they suffer a temporary loss of control. This is signified by blurry graphics, heart-pounding audio, and a difference in car response.

Eventually this temporary condition ends and driver condition points begin to regenerate according to the rate that is established in the player's statistics. When computer-controlled drivers suffer a Knockout, their driving becomes visibly slower and slightly erratic. Expert players will be able to recognize the pattern that the knocked out vehicle will take and can avoid them completely. The erratic movements tend to include slowing down, wobbling around the course, followed by taking a slight dip to the left or the right (depending on the race track).

=== Damage model ===
All cars start each race with all available condition points. Collisions and/or off-course excursions will visibly damage cars, and reduce car condition points for the duration of the race. Off-road excursions presumably create excessive tire wear and suspension damage to racing cars. In any case, the phenomenon serves to inflict a penalty for cheating short-cuts; excessive off-course excursions can destroy a vehicle the same way that banging it excessively can do. This phenomenon can also reward players who remain on the road by letting them get bumped more frequently before being marked down as a "DNF".

The player's car, and the opponents' cars, can be damaged to zero car condition points. When that happens, retirement is forced. Car damage is shown visibly in the rendered models, as well as on a condition gauge which indicates how much more damage the car can take.

== Reception ==
Ian Dransfield of VideoGamer.com rated the game 3 out of 10 and stated that it "has lots of ideas, but no great ones". Chris Roper of IGN rated the game 4 out of 10 and criticized the controls and the artificial intelligence, and said that many of the vehicles "drive very, very similarly". In his review, "Alfa Romeo Racing Italiano is certainly interesting, but it's too bad it's not any good. There are plenty of good and unique ideas here, but none of them work out as well as they could or should have". Greg Mueller of GameSpot rated the game 4.5 out of 10 and noted that despite the game's selection of vehicles, many of them "are just different versions of the same model". Mueller also criticized the controls and graphics, and stated that the role-playing aspect "makes the lifeless racing a bit more interesting", but "it's not enough to save the dull racing and dated presentation of this game".
