= Superbike 2001 =

2000 video game

- North American cover art
- Developer: Milestone
- Publisher: Electronic Arts
- Platform: Microsoft Windows
- Release: EU: October 6, 2000; NA: October 9, 2000
- Genre: Motorcycle racing
- Modes: Single-player, multiplayer

Superbike 2001 is a motorcycle racing video game developed by Milestone srl, published by Electronic Arts (EA), and released in 2000 for Microsoft Windows. It is part of EA's Superbike video game series.

The game features all tracks and motorcycles that existed on the 2000 Superbike World Championship season, and allows players to race in either single races or longer blocks of weekend races or championship races to access more of the game's content.

== Gameplay ==
Superbike 2001 is a simulation game which aims to deliver a realistic motorcycle racing experience. The user controls a motorcycle through races on various paved courses; it features tracks and motorcycles from the 2000 Superbike World Championship season. The game allows the player to choose between three game modes: Quick Start, Single Race, and Championship mode. Quick Start allows the user to quickly pick up a game and begin to play. Single Race lets the player play over one weekend, including practice laps and other race modes. Championship mode takes place over 32 weekends, or a full season of play, and includes detailed statistics. Superbike 2001 features four different difficulty modes, which make the game switch from a more casual experience to a realistic one.

Statistics and bike attributes are completely customizable, and can be adjusted by the user to find a good balance. The physics engine allows for realistic crashes to occur, such as losing a bike from underneath the rider.

== Reception ==
Reception

Aggregate score
Aggregator	Score
Metacritic	88/100

Review scores
Publication	Score
CNET Gamecenter	8/10
Computer Games Strategy Plus	5/5
Computer Gaming World	5/5
EP Daily	9/10
GameSpot	9.1/10
IGN	9/10
PC Gamer (US)	83%
PC Zone	69%

The game received "favorable" reviews according to video game review aggregator Metacritic. IGN's Dan Adams hailed the game as an outstanding fusion of arcade and realistic simulation games. GameSpot's Scott Osborne felt that it showed the best of what the motorcycle racing genre had to offer in a video game. David Long of Computer Games Strategy Plus awarded the game a perfect score and praised the game's graphics, describing them as "almost photo-realistic."

The game was nominated for the "Best Graphics, Technical" and "Best Driving Game" awards at GameSpot's Best and Worst of 2000 Awards, which went to Giants: Citizen Kabuto and Need for Speed: Porsche Unleashed, respectively. The staff of Computer Games Magazine nominated the game for their 2000 "Racing Game of the Year" award, whose winner remains unknown. It was also a runner-up for "Racing Game of 2000" in Readers' Choice, and for "Best Graphics" in Editors' Choice at IGN's Best of 2000 Awards. The game was nominated for the Racing award at Computer Gaming World's 2001 Premier Awards, which went to Motocross Madness 2. It was also a runner-up for GameSpy's "2000 Sports Game of the Year", which went to PGA Championship Golf 2000. The staff wrote: "Add incredible AI to the mix and we're looking at one of the best games that you've never heard of."
