= Racing Evoluzione =

2003 video game

- North American cover art
- Developer: Milestone srl
- Publisher: Infogrames Europe (Note: Released under the Atari brand name)
- Platform: Xbox
- Release: FRA: February 7, 2003; NA: February 18, 2003; PAL: February 28, 2003
- Genre: Racing
- Modes: Single-player, multiplayer

Racing Evoluzione (known in North America as Apex) is an arcade-style racing video game developed by Milestone srl and published by Infogrames Europe exclusively for the Xbox in 2003. The game contains a main game mode, called Dream Mode, which allows the player to manage a car dealership, create their own cars, and participate in races with their creations.

== Gameplay ==
In dream mode, the player finds blueprints of concept cars and has to choose a logo and name for their company. While it loosely relies on a linear story, it is viewed from a first-person perspective during cut-scenes. When the player processes through a specific number of single races and championships, the company building will improve. For an example, after completing the first championship, and a few single races, the building will transform from an old-fashioned 1950s style garage to a small organization headquarters. Whenever the company building grows, an additional character appears; from the start the player's buddy Rick assists them with most things, after the next building improvement Carla appears as a receptionist, an additional feature when unlocking Carla is more mechanics all of whom in turn assists their buddy Rick, after the second building improvement Rebecca appears. Her task is to manage the production. After the third, and last improvement Benjamin appears. He highly resembles a "cliché'" scientist and physicist. His role is to lead the designing area.

Unlike many plot driven racing games, Racing Evoluzione uses "R&D (research & development) funds" as currency; when the funds reach a specific amount, a new car will be ready to be developed. There are four different car types. The first line of cars are roadsters. Each roadster has three different versions: the first version is a regular street version; the second version is an evolution version with a few improvements; the third and final version is a racing version of which it has only one colour scheme, unlike the other versions that have several different colours. The second car type is sports cars. Their improving manner is identical to the roadsters. With three versions, and improvement after improvement, and not to mention that the racing version only has got one paint job. The third line of cars are super cars; unlike the first two types, super cars only come with an evolution version and a racing version. The last line of cars are dream cars, they only come in racing versions. The game has a mix of original fictional cars as well as real-world licensed cars. There are many different race tracks, sorted in four different types; city tracks, mountain tracks, racetracks, and speedways. Each track type has three locations; North America, Europe, and Asia. After every race, one of the characters will comment the player based on their performance, except for Benjamin, who only has dialogue whenever a new car is ready for production.

== Reception ==
Reception

Aggregate score
Aggregator	Score
Metacritic	74/100

Review scores
Publication	Score
Edge	5/10
Electronic Gaming Monthly	8/10
Eurogamer	9/10
Game Informer	7.75/10
GamePro	4/5 stars
GameRevolution	C+
GameSpot	7.2/10
GameSpy	4/5 stars
GameZone	7/10
IGN	7.8/10
Official Xbox Magazine (US)	8.9/10

The game received "mixed or average" reviews, according to the review aggregation website Metacritic, receiving a score of 74/100, based on 26 critic reviews.
