= SBK 2011 =

2011 video game

SBK 2011: Superbike World Championship
- Developer: Milestone
- Publisher: Black Bean Games
- Platforms: Microsoft Windows, PlayStation 3, Xbox 360
- Release: EU: 13 May 2011
- Genre: Racing
- Modes: Single-player & multiplayer

SBK 2011: Superbike World Championship is a motorcycle racing game, and the fifth installment of the SBK series developed by Milestone srl and published by Black Bean Games. The game features all the riders of the 2011 Superbike World Championship and the teams and riders of the 2010 Supersport World Championship season and Superstock 1000 championship of 2010, just like SBK X: Superbike World Championship.

The game received a commendable 8/10 rating on GameSpot. Released in 2010, it features both arcade and simulation modes, each offering distinct experiences. The simulation mode incorporates realistic motorbike settings, while the arcade mode eliminates realism and even slows the bike down when off-track.

== Reception ==
Joseph Barron of GameSpot said "[there] is a little way to go before SBK has the production values of its four-wheeled racer rivals". In his IGN review, Joao Diniz Sanches called the game "a fine ride, sure, but it could have been a thrilling one".

Reception

Review scores
Publication	Score
GameSpot	8/10
IGN	7/10

== External ==
- Official website
