= Gravel (video game) =

2018 racing video game

- Developer: Milestone srl
- Publishers: Milestone srl Square Enix
- Designer: Irvin Zonca
- Artist: Manuel Capitani
- Engine: Unreal Engine 4
- Platforms: Microsoft Windows, PlayStation 4, Xbox One, MacOS, Linux
- Release: February 27, 2018; January 17, 2019 (MacOS, Linux)
- Genre: Racing

Gravel is a 2018 racing video game developed by Milestone srl and published by Milestone and Square Enix for Microsoft Windows, PlayStation 4 and Xbox One. MacOS and Linux ports by Virtual Programming were released in January 2019.

== Gameplay ==
The game revolves around competing in a racing television program called Off-Road Masters. Each player must earn stars to move on to the next challenge.

== Reception ==
Reception

Aggregate score
Aggregator	Score
Metacritic	PC: 62/100; PS4: 67/100; XONE: 67/100

Review scores
Publication	Score
Computer Games Magazine	5/10
Hardcore Gamer	3/5
IGN	5.9/10
Push Square	7/10

Gravel has received mixed reviews since its release. Eurogamer Italy opined that Gravel is challenging and entertaining, but "not enough to compete with the best titles in the genre". Review aggregation site Metacritic gave the PlayStation 4 version an average rating of 67 out of 100 based on reviews from 30 critics.
