= MotoGP 15 =

2015 video game

- Developer: Milestone srl
- Publishers: Milestone srl Bandai Namco Entertainment
- Series: MotoGP
- Platforms: Microsoft Windows; PlayStation 3 PlayStation 4 Xbox 360; Xbox One
- Release: 24 June 2015
- Genre: Racing
- Modes: Single-player, multiplayer

MotoGP 15 is a video game developed by Milestone srl. The game was released for Microsoft Windows, PlayStation 3, PlayStation 4, Xbox 360 and Xbox One on 24 June 2015. It is the first to be released on Xbox One and final installment for PlayStation 3 and Xbox 360.

== Features ==
MotoGP 15 features 18 tracks, and the official riders from the 2014 and 2015 seasons of Moto3, Moto2 and MotoGP, as well as customizable bikes. The season starts with the night race in Losail, and also includes Jerez, Assen and Sepang, with a wind and wet weather system. Other features include tire wear, damage and mechanical failures. The PS4 and Xbox One versions feature open visors of helmets.

Per official entries, Paul Bird Motorsport retired from the championship, but Suzuki and Aprilia made an official return. One new feature is the ability for the player to create their own racing team, with choice of logo and livery. Starting off with a Mahindra MGP3O bike, the player must advance through the classes, and recruit sponsors. The game also has a mode which focuses on recreating events from the 2014 season, and in particular the rivalry between Jorge Lorenzo, Valentino Rossi and Marc Márquez, and the comebacks from riders such as Andrea Iannone. The PlayStation 4 version features an online league mode, where players battle for the best lap times.

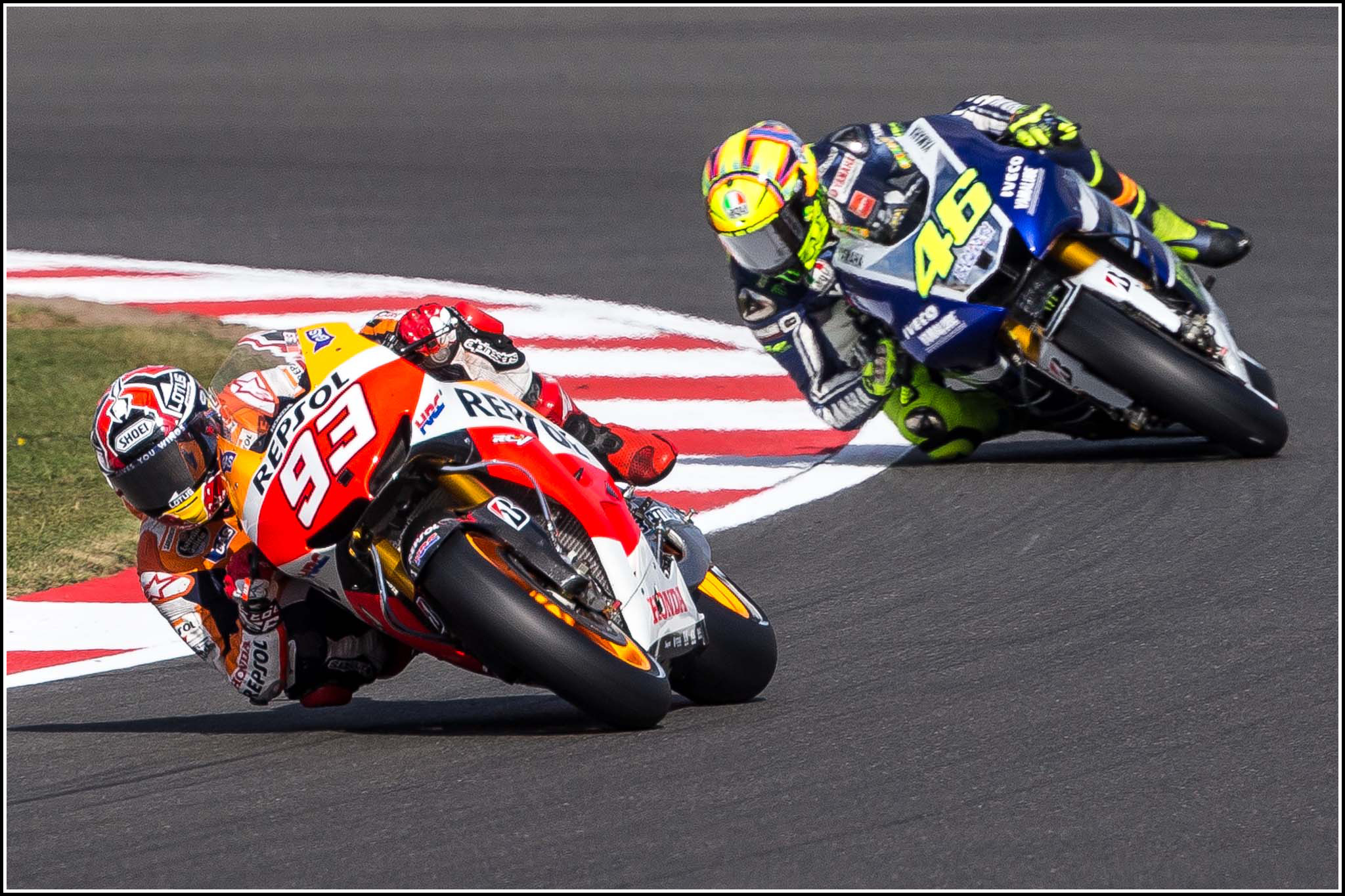
Current riders Marquez (foreground) and Rossi (background) are both included in the game

The game includes a total of over 100 riders, each in their respective teams, making up the three current classes (e.g. the Ducati Desmosedici and Honda NSF250R), and one historic class (covering 1992–2001, e.g. the Cagiva GP500), with a total of around 25 bikes. Some riders need to be unlocked via the game's experience/level system. A further historic class is available to download (covering 2004–2006, e.g. the Kawasaki ZX-RR); following the release of the 4-Stroke Champions DLC, it became the first Milestone game to feature the Kawasaki ZX-RR.

Pre-race introduction voice-overs are provided by Gavin Emmett.

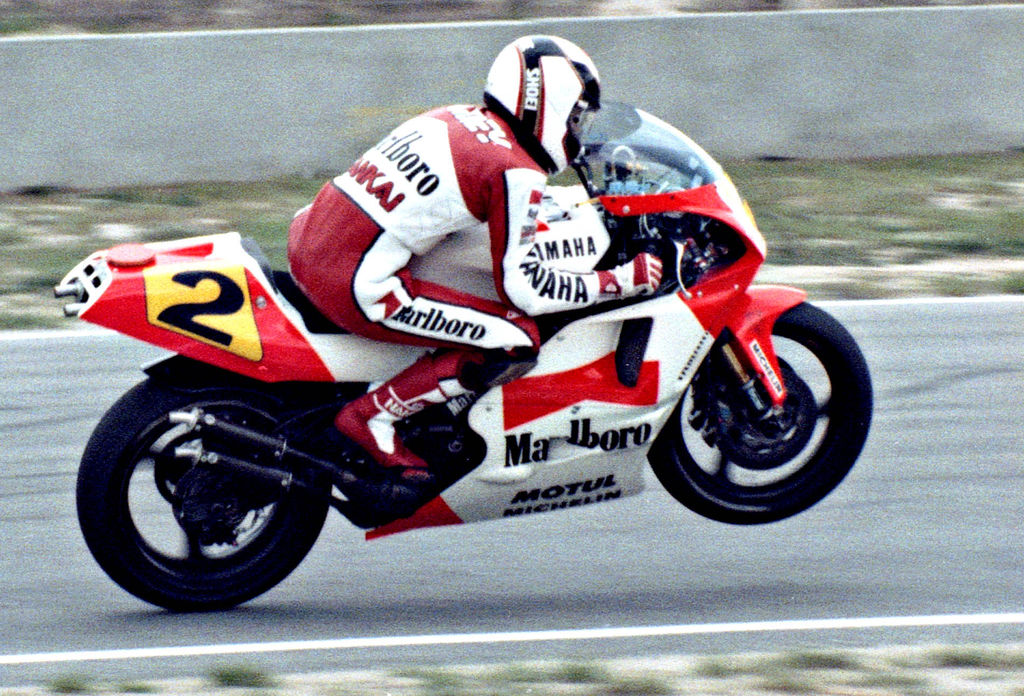
Yamaha's Wayne Rainey is one of the classic riders included in the game

=== Downloadable content ===
In June 2015, 20 riders from the 2004 season were made available. In September 2015, 24 riders from the 2015 Red Bull MotoGP Rookies Cup season were made available. In December 2015, the Autódromo do Estoril (last used in 2012) was released, and can be used in single and multi-player modes.

== Reception ==
Reception

Aggregate scores
Aggregator	Score
GameRankings	64.29%
Metacritic	66/100

Review scores
Publication	Score
GamesTM	5/10
IGN	70
PlayStation Official Magazine – Australia	70%
PlayStation Official Magazine – UK	7/10
Official Xbox Magazine (UK)	7/10
Analog Addiction	7.6

The game had mixed reviews. The developer issued a warning that the Xbox One version contained a number of bugs. On the PlayStation 4, the consensus was that it looked ok, but did not improve significantly on the previous game. The Official PlayStation Magazine praised the bike handling, adding that "AI riders put up a great fight, outbraking you into hairpins and slipstreaming past you down the straights. ... overall, the racing is solid and challenging, and securing a podium finish without resorting to the rewind function is a significant achievement." Analog Addiction praised the customisable race options and the stable and enjoyable multiplayer component.

MotoGP 15 reached number 11 in the UK PS3 sales charts, as of April 19, 2016 still not available in North America and number 16 in the PS4 charts.
