= Superstars V8 Next Challenge =

2010 video game

- Developer: Milestone
- Publishers: NA: Deep Silver; EU: Black Bean Games
- Platforms: Xbox 360; PlayStation 3 Microsoft Windows
- Release: EU: February 26, 2010; NA: January 25, 2011
- Genre: Racing
- Modes: Single-player, 16-player online multiplayer

Superstars V8 Next Challenge is a car racing video game based on the Italy-based Superstars Series and was released on February 26, 2010, and is available for Xbox 360, PlayStation 3 and Windows. It is the sequel to Superstars V8 Racing.

== Reception ==
Superstars V8 Next Challenge received "mixed or average" reviews from critics, according to review aggregator website Metacritic. PC Gamer gave a rating of 48 out of 100 and wrote: "Limited, uninspiring touring car racing."
