= SBK Generations =

2012 video game

- Developer: Milestone
- Publisher: Black Bean Games
- Series: Superbike World Championship
- Platforms: Microsoft Windows, PlayStation 3, Xbox 360
- Release: EU: May 1, 2012
- Genre: Racing
- Modes: Single-player, Multiplayer

SBK Generations is a motorcycle racing video game. It is the final game published by Black Bean Games and is the sixth installment of the SBK series developed by Milestone. SBK Generations features riders and tracks from the Superbike World Championship, across the 2009 to 2012 seasons.

== Reception ==
SBK Generations received "mixed or average reviews", according to the review aggregator Metacritic. Motorcycle News gave the game a 2/5 score, while Gamereactor gave a score of 6 out of 10, noting that "for newcomers and casuals, it's a tough nut to crack, lacking the entry-level finesse to make it appealing".

Reception

Aggregate score
Aggregator	Score
Metacritic	(Xbox 360) 61/100 (PS3) 63/100
