= MotoGP 17 =

2017 video game

- Developer: Milestone srl
- Publisher: Milestone srl
- Series: MotoGP
- Platforms: Microsoft Windows; PlayStation 4 Xbox One
- Release: PAL: June 15, 2017; NA: July 11, 2017
- Genre: Racing
- Modes: Single-player, multiplayer

MotoGP 17 is a motorcycle racing video game developed by Milestone srl.

== Reception ==
The game received average reviews by the media, as the game removed many of its predecessor's unique features and wasn't much of an upgrade overall.

Reception

Aggregate scores
Aggregator	Score
GameRankings	65.62%
Metacritic	68/100
