= MotoGP 14 =

2014 video game

- MotoGP 14 for PC cover art
- Developer: Milestone
- Publisher: Milestone
- Series: MotoGP
- Platforms: Microsoft Windows; PlayStation 3 Xbox 360; PlayStation Vita; PlayStation 4
- Release: EU: 20 June 2014; NA: 20 June 2014 (PC); AU: 27 June 2014 (PC, Vita); AU: 17 July 2014; NA: 4 November 2014
- Genre: Racing
- Modes: Single-player, multiplayer

MotoGP 14 is a video game developed by Milestone.

The game was released in 2014 for Microsoft Windows, PlayStation 3, PlayStation Vita and Xbox 360. On 10 June 2014, Milestone announced that the game would be released in North America on 4 November and that Bandai Namco Entertainment would be the distributor for this region. MotoGP 14 was also released on PlayStation 4, and was the first next-generation title developed by Milestone.

The game includes all the teams, riders and circuits from the 2014 MotoGP World Championship and include all 3 classes: Moto3, Moto2 and MotoGP. Building on the foundations of MotoGP 13, the game brings new features including a brand new audio and graphics engine, and revamped physics, aimed at improving upon the shortcomings of MotoGP 13 highlighted by critics and players alike. The development of the game involved over 200 people, and took around a year and a half.

== Features ==
MotoGP 14 boasts an all new sound engine and graphics engine which allows for improved engine audio as well as revamped graphics, including improvements in lighting and shading.

Single player modes include Time Attack, Grand Prix, Championship, Career and a new Scenario Mode, where players are put into a variety of situations based on past MotoGP events. The player creates their own rider and starts as a wildcard with the ultimate aim of becoming MotoGP World Champion. Along the way the player manages sponsors and bike upgrades as well as virtual fans and press through social media and interactions.

The game includes both 12 player online and two player local multiplayer. Online game modes include Grand Prix, Championship and Sprint Season. Also included is a mode called Split Battle, where players aim to complete the most number of laps and fastest sector splits in limited time. There is also a mode which offers control of the BMW M4 safety car.

Per the calendar, the Laguna Seca race was removed but added as downloadable content, and a new race was added at Autódromo Termas de Río Hondo.

In October 2014, Donington Park was added as downloadable content.

== Reception ==
Reception

Aggregate score
Aggregator	Score				
Aggregator	PC	PS Vita	PS3	PS4	Xbox 360
Metacritic	76/100	78/100	70/100	73/100	72/100

Review scores
Publication	Score				
Publication	PC	PS Vita	PS3	PS4	Xbox 360
Eurogamer	N/A	N/A	N/A	8/10	N/A
GamesMaster	77%	N/A	N/A	N/A	N/A
GamesRadar+	N/A	N/A	N/A	3.5/5	N/A
GamesTM	N/A	N/A	N/A	7/10	N/A
PlayStation Official Magazine – Australia	N/A	N/A	N/A	75%	N/A
PlayStation Official Magazine – UK	N/A	N/A	N/A	7/10	N/A
Official Xbox Magazine (UK)	N/A	N/A	N/A	N/A	7/10

The PC and PlayStation Vita versions received "generally favorable reviews", while the PlayStation 3, PlayStation 4 and Xbox 360 versions received "average" reviews, according to the review aggregation website Metacritic.

Hardcore Gamer said of the PS4 version, "With this as the first cross-generational game in the series, it would make sense to start things off right with a killer game. Sadly, that hasn't quite happened, and the end product doesn't just amplify existing issues, but brings some new ones to the table as well."

Everyeye.it summarised the game as a "Brand new engine and a good balance between simulation and arcade", with SpazioGames concluding that it was "a major step forward for Milestone. This is undoubtedly one of their most successful works, a mass of content held together by a deep, detailed and difficult-to-master gameplay". ZTGD said that "fans of the sport and franchise have a lot great modes to look forward to, with not only single player races but multiplayer also", while PSX-Sense said that "the graphics aren't as appealing as they should be."

The game reached number 11 in the UK PS3 sales charts and number 6 in the PS4 charts.
