= MotoGP 20 =

2020 video game

- European PlayStation 4 cover art
- Developer: Milestone srl
- Publisher: Milestone srl
- Series: MotoGP
- Engine: Unreal Engine 4
- Platforms: Microsoft Windows; PlayStation 4 Xbox One; Nintendo Switch; Stadia
- Release: WW: April 23, 2020
- Genre: Racing
- Modes: Single-player, multiplayer

MotoGP 20 is a video game developed by Milestone srl.

== Features ==
MotoGP 20 has these game modes: Historical, Multiplayer, Career, Fast Modes, Personalization and historical Content.

The new AI, dubbed "Neural AI 2.0" is more efficient in riding, and is able to manage tyre wear and fuel consumption unlike MotoGP 19's AI. The Managerial Career returns to the series with improvements. The player has a team of professionals including the Personal Manager, the Chief Engineer and the Data Analyst, their role will be vital for finding engagements, obtaining data on the track and developing the motorbike.

MotoGP 20 features the season as it was originally intended to be run before the season was disrupted by the COVID-19 pandemic, which saw several races postponed or cancelled, with a race at the Algarve International Circuit held. However, it has the Thai Grand Prix after the Aragon round, when the Thai race was originally intended to be run on March 22.

It also includes the cancelled Finnish Grand Prix for the first time.

== Reception ==
Reception

Aggregate scores
Aggregator	Score
Metacritic	(PC) 81/100 (XONE) 82/100 (PS4) 76/100
OpenCritic	63% recommend

Review scores
Publication	Score
Game Informer	8/10
Nintendo Life	8/10
Push Square	8/10
Shacknews	8/10

The PC, Xbox One, and PlayStation 4 versions of MotoGP 20 all received generally favorable reviews from critics, according to the review aggregation website Metacritic. Fellow review aggregator OpenCritic assessed that the game received strong approval, being recommended by 63% of critics.
