= SBK-09: Superbike World Championship =

2009 video game

- Developer(s): Milestone S.r.l.
- Publisher(s): Black Bean Games
- Platform(s): PlayStation 2, PlayStation 3, PlayStation Portable, Windows, Xbox 360
- Release: EU: 29 May 2009
- Genre(s): Racing
- Mode(s): Single-player, multiplayer

SBK-09: Superbike World Championship is a motorcycle racing game developed by Milestone S.r.l. and published in 2009 by Black Bean Games for the PlayStation 2, PlayStation 3, PlayStation Portable, Windows and Xbox 360, the same platforms as its predecessor, SBK-08: Superbike World Championship.

== Reception ==
SBK-09 received mixed reviews, with a Metacritic average of 71% on the PS3 and 70% on the Xbox 360.

IT Reviews praised the game's accessibility and its appeal to both novice and hardened racers. The review said, "The medium skill settings represent a suitably measured challenge to the average gamer, with reasonably realistic but not punishing bike physics. Crank it up to the top level, however, and the bike becomes very demanding, requiring a feel for proper braking and accelerating techniques."

Xbox World 360 magazine in the UK commented that SBK-09 was "Impressive - as long as you don't expect a massive evolution of last year's game".

IGN disagreed and said, "SBK-09 is a flavourless affair with a personality like an R&B’ing Joaquin Phoenix. It feels very much like a game for sim-nuts."
