= MotoGP 18 =

2018 racing video game

- Developer: Milestone srl
- Publisher: Milestone srl
- Series: MotoGP
- Engine: Unreal Engine 4
- Platforms: PlayStation 4 Windows; Xbox One; Nintendo Switch
- Release: PlayStation 4, Windows, Xbox One; June 7, 2018; Nintendo Switch; June 28, 2018
- Genre: Sim racing
- Modes: Single-player, multiplayer

MotoGP 18 is a 2018 racing video game developed and published by Milestone srl for Windows, PlayStation 4, Xbox One, and Nintendo Switch.

== Reception ==
MotoGP 18 received "mixed or average" reviews, according tor review aggregator Metacritic.

Reception

Aggregate score
Aggregator	Score
Metacritic	PS4: 66/100; XONE: 73/100; NS: 59/100

Review scores
Publication	Score
Nintendo Life	6/10
Shacknews	6/10
