= Super-Bikes Riding Challenge =

2006 video game

- Developer: Milestone
- Publisher: Black Bean Games
- Platforms: Windows, PlayStation 2
- Release: EU: October 6, 2006
- Genre: Racing
- Modes: Single-player, multiplayer

Super-Bikes Riding Challenge is a 2006 racing video game developed by Milestone for Windows and PlayStation 2.

A sequel, Suzuki Super-Bikes II: Riding Challenge, was released in 2006 for the PlayStation 2 by Valcon Games. A Nintendo DS version was released in 2008.

== Gameplay ==
Super-Bikes Riding Challenge is a game about motorcycle racing. The game includes a total of 40 bikes from manufacturers like Honda, Suzuki, Ducati, Triumph, Moto Guzzi, and Voxan. The tracks are a mix of fictitious and real-world locations like Valencia, Hockenheim, Laguna Seca and Donington Park. The game has four game modes: free ride, trophies (tournament), career, and multiplayer. The game doesn't feature damage modeling. The multiplayer mode allows racing by two people in a split-screen format. There is no internet or network playmode.

== Reception ==
Reception

Review scores
Publication	Score
4Players	65/100
Eurogamer	7/10 (UK); 6/10 (DE)
Jeuxvideo.com	12/20
Joystick	6/10
PSM3	64/100
576 Konzol	6/10
Computer idea	6.5/10
Gameplay	3.5/5
PC Action	68%
Pelit	78/100
Playmanía	80/100

GamesRadar wrote in a preview: "Currently at around 90% finished, the game is playing very well, although the difficulty level does need some tweaking. The graphics are solid and very smooth and there were only a few instances where the bikes' behaviour didn't look entirely realistic."

Eurogamer said the graphics aren't as good as in Tourist Trophy but the racing action is better. 4Players compared the game negatively to Tourist Trophy and THQ's MotoGP.
