= Valentino Rossi: The Game =

2016 video game

- Developer: Milestone S.r.l.
- Publisher: Milestone S.r.l.
- Series: MotoGP
- Platforms: Microsoft Windows; PlayStation 4 Xbox One
- Release: 16 June 2016
- Genre: Racing
- Modes: Single-player, multiplayer

Valentino Rossi: The Game is a motorcycle racing video game developed and published by Milestone S.r.l. The game was released on 16 June 2016 for Microsoft Windows, MacOS, PlayStation 4, and, Xbox One. It serves as the official video game of the 2016 MotoGP World Championship season. The game features the endorsement of Valentino Rossi, a former Italian professional motorcycle racer.

== Features ==
The 2016 official MotoGP video game includes elements related to the racer Valentino Rossi, the 2016 MotoGP World Championship season, and features from the previous game. Players have the opportunity to engage in the official MotoGP World Championship, following Rossi's career from its inception to the present. The game allows players to assume control of a rally car and compete on different tracks, including the Monza Rally. Additionally, players can take part in flat-track races and explore Valentino Rossi's ranch.

== Reception ==
Reception

Aggregate score
Aggregator	Score
Metacritic	75/100

The game received a score of 75/100 on the review aggregator Metacritic.
