= Ride 4 =

- Developer: Milestone
- Publisher: Milestone
- Engine: Unreal Engine 4
- Platforms: PlayStation 4; Windows; Xbox One; PlayStation 5; Xbox Series X/S
- Release: Win, PS4, XONE; WW: October 8, 2020; PS5, Xbox Series X/S; WW: January 21, 2021
- Genre: Racing
- Modes: Single-player, multiplayer

Ride 4 is a racing video game developed and published by Milestone. Players engage in motorcycle racing, either single-player or multiplayer.

== Gameplay ==
Players engage in motorcycle racing using one of 170 motorcycles in 30 circuits, some of which are licensed. It has online multiplayer.

== Development ==
Milestone released Ride 4 on Windows, PlayStation 4, and Xbox One on October 8, 2020. They ported it to the PlayStation 5 and Xbox Series X/S on January 21, 2021.

== Reception ==
On the review aggregation website Metacritic, Ride 4 received positive reviews on Windows and the Xbox One. The PlayStation 4 and 5 versions received mixed reviews. Fellow review aggregator OpenCritic assessed that the game received fair approval, being recommended by 58% of critics. Shacknews said that, for fans of motorcycle racing, it "needs to be on your shortlist". GamingBolt praised the visuals but said the content and controls feel like they are 10 years older. Although they felt veterans would like it, they said beginners may find it brutally difficult. Hardcore Gamer called it "the best entry in the series" and "challenging, but in a good way". A gameplay video for the PlayStation 5 went viral for its photorealistic graphics. Eurogamer looked at Race 4 after the video went viral. They said Race 4 is "certainly very impressive", though the photorealistic graphics during gameplay are somewhat more limited than during the video. For example, while playing, the camera is positioned less realistically for player comfort and playability, and the more realistic camera angle is used for replays. Also reviewing the PlayStation 5 version, Push Square wrote, "Outside of its great use of the DualSense, Ride 4 is a frustrating and disappointing experience." They felt the game did not innovate enough over the PlayStation 4 version and criticized real money transactions, what they felt was a boring campaign, and the lack of a tutorial and local multiplayer.
