= Superbike 2000 =

2000 video game

- Developer: Milestone s.r.l.
- Publisher: EA Sports
- Platforms: Microsoft Windows, PlayStation
- Release: NA: March 1, 2000; EU: March 2000
- Genre: Racing
- Modes: Single-player, multiplayer

Superbike 2000 is a motorcycle racing video game, developed by Milestone s.r.l. and published by EA Sports for Microsoft Windows and PlayStation in 2000. It is part of EA's Superbike video game series.

== Reception ==
Reception

Aggregate score
Aggregator	Score	
Aggregator	PC	PS
GameRankings	86%	58%

Review scores
Publication	Score	
Publication	PC	PS
CNET Gamecenter	8/10	N/A
Computer Games Strategy Plus	4.5/5	N/A
Computer Gaming World	5/5	N/A
Electronic Gaming Monthly	N/A	4/10
Game Informer	N/A	4/10
GameFan	N/A	68%
GamePro	4/5	N/A
GameSpot	8.7/10	3.4/10
GameZone	9/10	N/A
IGN	8/10	4/10
Official U.S. PlayStation Magazine	N/A	1.5/5
PC Accelerator	7/10	N/A
PC Gamer (US)	89%	N/A
The Cincinnati Enquirer	N/A	3/4

The PC version received favorable reviews, while the PlayStation version received mixed reviews, according to the review aggregation website GameRankings.
