= Corvette Evolution GT =

2006 video game

- Evolution GT (European version)
- Developers: Milestone; Island Racing Studios (DS version)
- Publishers: NA: Valcon Games; EU: Black Bean Games
- Engine: RenderWare
- Platforms: PlayStation 2 Windows; Nintendo DS
- Release: PlayStation 2: EU: May 26, 2006; AU: September 28, 2006; NA: October 2, 2006; Windows: EU: May 26, 2006; Nintendo DS: NA: January 15, 2008; EU: June 27, 2008
- Genre: Racing
- Modes: Single-player, multiplayer

Corvette Evolution GT (known as Evolution GT in Europe) is a racing video game released for PlayStation 2 and Windows in 2006. A version for Nintendo DS was released in 2008.

The Nintendo DS version is similar to its console counterpart, but it does not feature the attributes from them. It was developed by Island Racing Studios. It features only a part of the cars and tracks from the PlayStation 2 and Windows version (12 cars and 8 tracks, opposed to 33 cars and almost 30 tracks) and similar events appear in the game.

== Reception ==
Reception

Aggregate score
Aggregator	Score
GameRankings	61%

Review scores
Publication	Score
Eurogamer	5/10 (PC)
GameSpot	6.9/10 (PS2)
IGN	4.1/10 (PS2); 4.8/10 (DS)

The PC version has a 61 percent score on GameRankings.

GameSpot gave the game a 6.9 average rating, praising it for its deep RPG style driver development, good career mode and excellent AI, while criticism was aimed at poor presentation, lack of online multiplayer and lack of extras. Videogamer.com praised the game for its handling models and great variety of tracks, while criticizing the tutorial. Eurogamer criticized the game for being too boring, and offering an exaggerated simulation.
