= MotoGP 13 =

2013 video game

- PAL cover art featuring Valentino Rossi, Randy de Puniet, and Dani Pedrosa
- Developer: Milestone
- Publishers: Milestone; Plug in Digital (NA; PC)
- Series: MotoGP
- Platforms: PlayStation 3, Microsoft Windows, PlayStation Vita, Xbox 360
- Release: NA: 20 June 2013 (PC; Steam); NA: 21 June 2013 (PC); EU: 21 June 2013; AU: 21 June 2013 (Vita); AU: 4 July 2013 (PS3, X360); NA: 17 June 2014 (PS3); NA: 5 August 2014 (Vita); Compact: NA: 18 December 2013 (Vita); EU: 18 December 2013 (PS3); EU: 8 January 2014 (PS3)
- Genre: Racing
- Modes: Single-player, multiplayer

MotoGP 13 is a motorcycle racing game developed and published by Milestone and released in 2013. The game was announced by Milestone taking back production, after its departure on the franchise with MotoGP '08. Along with the racing game's inclusion on the PlayStation Vita handheld, Milestone announced that it would return support to the PC, as well as versions for Xbox 360 and PlayStation 3.

== Features ==
MotoGP 13 features all the tracks, riders and teams from the 2013 season of the MotoGP, Moto2 and Moto3 world championships.

MotoGP 13 features 4 single player game modes: Grand Prix, World Championship, Career and Time attack. Grand Prix is a standard mode where the player picks a class, team and rider along with the track and weather conditions. This game mode takes the player across a single Grand Prix weekend including practice, qualifying and the race. World Championship mode allows the player to ride a full or custom season in either MotoGP, Moto2 or Moto3.

Career mode is the main single player mode and incorporates first and third person elements. Upon a few wildcard events, the player will earn a ride in Moto3 and begin their career. From here the player rides through multiple seasons, earning new rides with the aim of ultimately becoming MotoGP world champion. Career mode boasts many new features to MotoGP video games. These include Parc Ferme, motorhomes and a walkable garage. The career mode is also expanded with objectives given from your own Personnel Manager.

Time Attack allows the player to race themselves endlessly against the clock. Multiplayer features online game modes as well as split screen multiplayer.

Multiple physics settings and aids allow for beginners as well as the experienced to have an immersive experience.

A brand new weather system also features in MotoGP 13. The player can select from 5 weather options one of which is dynamic where the race could start in dry conditions and then begin to rain during the race.

The game features in game commentary from former MotoGP international commentator Gavin Emmett, a real life based HUD and a brand new helmet cam similar to the one seen in Shift 2: Unleashed.

A demo of the game was released in early June and players would be able to choose either Valentino Rossi or Marc Márquez and race 3 laps at Circuit de Catalunya. The game features 100 GP Levels which are unlocked by gaining XP Points from racing.

== DLC and Update ==
- Moto2 and Moto3 – Free DLC that adds the 3 bikes, 3 teams and 4 riders to Moto2 and the 4 bikes, 9 teams, and 14 riders to Moto3 that are greyed out and not on the game disc, it also updates some bike liveries/rider outfits
- 2012 Top Riders – Adds 4 bikes, 4 teams, and 8 riders from the 2012 Season
- Champions – Adds 6 bikes, 9 teams, and 14 riders from the 1992, 1993, and 2001 seasons
- Red Bull Rookies Cup – Adds the RBRC Championship, 1 bike with 15 country liveries and 24 riders
- The game can update to Ver 1.02 (32MB) via the PS3's game update feature if wanted.

== Reception ==
Reception

Aggregate score
Aggregator	Score			
Aggregator	PC	PS Vita	PS3	Xbox 360
Metacritic	70/100	78/100	73/100	72/100

Review scores
Publication	Score			
Publication	PC	PS Vita	PS3	Xbox 360
Eurogamer	N/A	N/A	N/A	8/10
GamesMaster	N/A	N/A	N/A	75%
PlayStation Official Magazine – Australia	N/A	N/A	70%	N/A
PlayStation Official Magazine – UK	N/A	N/A	7/10	N/A
Official Xbox Magazine (UK)	N/A	N/A	N/A	6/10
Play	N/A	N/A	74%	N/A
The Digital Fix	N/A	N/A	N/A	6/10

The PlayStation Vita version received "generally favorable reviews", while the rest of the console versions received "average" reviews, according to the review aggregation website Metacritic. The game reached number 8 in the UK sales charts.
