= Superbike World Championship (video game) =

1999 video game

- Developer: Milestone s.r.l.
- Publisher: EA Sports
- Platform: Microsoft Windows
- Release: NA: March 3, 1999; EU: March 12, 1999
- Genre: Racing
- Modes: Single-player, multiplayer

Superbike World Championship is a motorcycle racing video game, developed by Milestone s.r.l. and published by EA Sports for Microsoft Windows in 1999. It is part of EA's Superbike video game series, and featured the riders of the 1997 season.

== Development ==
Milestone designed Superbike World Championship to be a simulation racer, incorporating technical data from each bike's manufacturer into the game and having professional motorcyclists try out the game-in-progress to access the handling.

== Reception ==
Reception

Aggregate score
| Aggregator | Score |
|---|---|
| GameRankings | 83% |

Review scores
| Publication | Score |
|---|---|
| AllGame | 3.5/5 |
| CNET Gamecenter | 8/10 |
| Computer Games Strategy Plus | 4/5 |
| Computer Gaming World | 5/5 |
| Edge | 7/10 |
| Game Informer | 7.75/10 |
| GamePro | 3.5/5 |
| GameSpot | 8.2/10 |
| IGN | 8.3/10 |
| PC Accelerator | 8/10 |
| PC Gamer (US) | 73% |

The game received favorable reviews according to the review aggregation website GameRankings.

Sales were mediocre in the first month, with sales of 7,701 units in the U.S. by April 1999, according to PC Data. David Lee, marketing representative for the game, said: "When we saw this title, we felt we had a winner on our hands. While the buzz about SBK hasn't reached the mass market yet, once word gets out, this franchise will definitely make an impact on the racing market."
