= SBK-08: Superbike World Championship =

2008 video game

SBK 08 Superbike World Championship
- PAL PC cover art
- Developer(s): Black Bean Games
- Publisher(s): Milestone srl
- Platform(s): PlayStation 2, PlayStation 3, PlayStation Portable, Xbox 360, PC
- Release: EU: August 1, 2008; NA: November 8, 2008
- Genre(s): Racing
- Mode(s): Single-player, multiplayer

SBK-08: Superbike World Championship (known as SBK Superbike World Championship in North America) is the official video game for the 2008 Superbike World Championship season, released for contemporary non-Nintendo platforms, with planned versions for Nintendo's Wii and Nintendo DS systems cancelled for unknown reasons. It features 22 official riders and 12 official race tracks. The European version of the PlayStation 3 release lacked PlayStation trophies support.

== See also ==
- MotoGP '08, the contemporary installment of the MotoGP series developed by Milestone for the same platforms, with a Wii version replacing the PSP.

== Reception ==
SBK08 received mixed reviews, with an average of 65% on GameRankings. Its lowest score was 55% from Play, and highest 7/10 from Total PC Gaming.
