= SBK X: Superbike World Championship =

2010 video game

- European edition cover art
- Developer(s): Milestone
- Publisher(s): Black Bean Games
- Platform(s): Microsoft Windows, PlayStation 3, Xbox 360
- Release: EU: 4 June 2010; NA: 19 October 2010
- Genre(s): Motorcycle racing
- Mode(s): Single-player, multiplayer

SBK X: Superbike World Championship is a motorcycle racing game, developed by Milestone srl and published by Black Bean Games in 2010. The game features three modes of gameplay: the arcade mode, the simulation mode and the multiplayer mode. Also for the first time in the series the game features the Superstock and Supersport championships. There is also the new career mode, composed of eight years, starting at the STK.

== Gameplay ==
=== Arcade mode ===
SBK-X features an intuitive mode named Arcade mode in which the player does not require the same precision and timing as in the simulation modes. The player also has at their disposal the boost button which enhances the speed of the motorcycle during straights. In this mode the player may enter in the Story mode, in which they have to accomplish some objectives including overtaking a number of adversaries or finishing at a certain position to complete.

=== Simulation mode ===
The simulation mode is focused on the more hardcore gamers who want to feel how is to really handle a motorcycle. However, the player may opt to play at a lower level of realism by changing the level of simulation to low or medium. This mode features the quick race, championship as well as the new career mode, in which the player has to rise through the ranks of the series to become a champion.

This mode also features an evolving track, which means that during the early moments of the weekend, the track still lacks the darker strips. As the bikes pass through the track, its grip raises thanks tires' wearing out, creating a darker strip in the race line. Also, when it is raining the parts of the track where bikes pass most starts to dry up.

=== Career ===
In the Career mode, the players may create his own avatar and start at the lowest category, the Superstock. By finishing at the teams' desired position, showing skill on the track, the player gains reputation points which are needed to attract attention of high-profile teams and going to the other categories. This mode can be played for eight years and the final objective is to become a champion.

== Release ==
The game was released on May 21, 2010, in Italy and June 4, 2010, in other European territories. It was not released in the US. The Legends Pack Special Edition was released for Xbox 360 and PlayStation 3 on May 26 for Italy and in the same date as the normal edition in the other territories.

=== Demo ===
The demo was released for Xbox 360 gold members on May 19. On May 26 the game was released for silver members as well as PC and PS3. It features the Portimão track with all available weather conditions, to be playable with Max Biaggi form SBK's Aprilia RSV4 as well as Cal Crutchlow, the 2009 champion of the Supersport.

== Reception ==
Reception

Aggregate scores
Aggregator	Score
GameRankings	72.40%
Metacritic	73/100

SBK X received positive reviews. Metacritic's score for the PS3 version is 73/100

== External ==
- Official website
- SBK X: Superbike World Championship at MobyGames
