= MotoGP '08 =

2008 video game

MotoGP 08
- Developer: Milestone
- Publisher: Capcom
- Series: MotoGP
- Platforms: PlayStation 3 Microsoft Windows; PlayStation 2 Wii; Xbox 360
- Release: EU: October 24, 2008; AU: October 24, 2008 (PS2, PS3, X360); NA: October 28, 2008; Wii: AU: October 30, 2008; NA: March 24, 2009; EU: April 24, 2009
- Genres: Racing, sports
- Modes: Single-player, Multiplayer, Multiplayer online

MotoGP 08 is a motorcycle racing video game. It is available for Microsoft Windows, Xbox 360, PlayStation 2, PlayStation 3, and Wii. (Note: Simply called MotoGP in the U.S. and in some European versions) For 2008, the rights to develop video games representing the MotoGP brand have been granted to a single publisher: Capcom. For the first time since MotoGP 4, the game includes the addition of playable 125cc and 250cc support classes. The Wii version of the game gives the player the option of using the Wii Remote as a handlebar, adding some lifelike control realism to the title.

== Reception ==
Reception

Aggregate score
Aggregator	Score				
Aggregator	PC	PS2	PS3	Wii	Xbox 360
Metacritic	65/100	67/100	65/100	44/100	68/100

Review scores
Publication	Score				
Publication	PC	PS2	PS3	Wii	Xbox 360
1Up.com	B−	B−	B−	N/A	B−
GamePro	N/A	N/A	4/5	N/A	N/A
GameRevolution	N/A	N/A	C+	N/A	C+
GameSpot	7/10	N/A	7/10	4.5/10	7/10
GamesRadar+	4/5	4/5	4/5	4/5	4/5
GameZone	N/A	N/A	N/A	N/A	8/10
IGN	5/10	5/10	5/10	5/10	5/10
Nintendo Power	N/A	N/A	N/A	4/10	N/A
Official Xbox Magazine (US)	N/A	N/A	N/A	N/A	7.5/10
PC Gamer (UK)	79%	N/A	N/A	N/A	N/A
PlayStation: The Official Magazine	N/A	N/A	3.5/5	N/A	N/A

The game received "mixed or average reviews" on all platforms except the Wii version, which received "generally unfavorable reviews", according to the review aggregation website Metacritic. PcMag gave a 2.5/5 score, while Common Sense Media gave 3 stars out of 5. Independent said about MotoGP 08 that "there's no doubt that if you're a keen follower of MotoGP you won't find a more complete experience, but that probably makes this one for the true fans". Gameplanet gave the game a 6.5/10 score, while PC World (AU) rated it with 4 stars out of 5.
