= Milestone (Italian company) =

Italian video game developer

Milestone S.r.l.
- Formerly: Graffiti (1994–1996)
- Company type: Subsidiary
- Industry: Video games
- Founded: 1994; 32 years ago
- Founder: Antonio Farina
- Headquarters: Milan, Italy
- Key people: Luisa Bixio (CEO)
- Number of employees: 280 (2022)
- Parent: Leader Group (2002–2011); Plaion (2019–present)
- Website: milestone.it

Milestone S.r.l. is an Italian video game developer based in Milan. Founded in 1994 by Antonio Farina, the studio specialises in racing games, especially motorcycle racing games. The company began under the name Graffiti, developing the car racing game Screamer. After the studio rebranded as Milestone in 1996, it used Screamer's success for multi-game publishing deals with Virgin Interactive and Electronic Arts. The poor performance of Racing Evoluzione, published by Atari with little marketing, lead to key figures leaving Milestone. As part of Leader Group from 2002 on, the studio hired many younger developers and developed multiple games for multiple platforms, including several based on the Superbike World Championship. This shaped Milestone's identity as a developer of motorcycle racing games. After detaching from Leader Group in 2011, the studio obtained the license for MotoGP games in 2013. In 2019, Milestone was acquired by Koch Media.

== History ==
Antonio Farina founded Milestone as Graffiti in 1994. The nascent studio's first notable game was Screamer, a racing game for personal computers. In 1996, the studio rebranded as Milestone and used Screamer's success to reach publishing agreements with Virgin Interactive and Electronic Arts (EA). Virgin Interactive published Screamer 2 and Screamer Rally, while EA obtained a licence for games based on the Superbike World Championship (SBK). Milestone and EA worked on three such games released through 2000. These games grew Milestone's visibility and led to a deal with Atari. The publisher was in a troubled financial situation at the time and approached Milestone with a game idea for what became Racing Evoluzione. The deal appeared like a good idea to Milestone but Atari provided little marketing and released it in 2003 in direct competition with Project Gotham Racing. In late 2002, Milestone joined Leader Group. Racing Evoluzione attracted mixed reviews and underperformed commercially, leading to the departures of key figures at the company. Consequently, the studio hired many younger developers, who sought to take the studio in a new direction. As part of Leader Group, Milestone initially worked exclusively with the internal publisher Lago but later found that working with external publishers would be in its best interest. Still, Milestone's position as a subsidiary allowed it to grow and develop multiple games for multiple platforms simultaneously.

With its younger staff, Milestone developed games that aimed to compete with the Gran Turismo series, albeit with limited scopes. This resulted in the production of Alfa Romeo Racing Italiano and Corvette Evolution GT. The studio then returned to games based on motorcycle racing, a popular sport in Italy, with Super-Bikes Riding Challenge. The game, released in 2006, greatly shaped the studio's identity, and it continued developing motorcycle racing games, including further games with an SBK license. It also supported Capcom's MotoGP games. Milestone grew to 55 employees by October 2007 and to 80 by January 2010, making it the largest video game developer in Italy. In 2011, Milestone restructured as an independent company, aiming for further growth while remaining self-reliant. It saw low earnings of €2.6 million in 2012 and consequently ceased developing games on a work-for-hire basis while it began self-publishing its games. Milestone obtained the licence for MotoGP-based games in 2013 and released the first such game, MotoGP 13, later that year. The success of the studio's MotoGP games led to licensing deals with FIM Motocross, WRC, and Monster Energy Supercross. The company's profits rose to €28 million by 2017. On 14 August 2019, Koch Media acquired Milestone, at the time with 200 employees, and all of its intellectual property for €44.9 million paid in cash. Chief executive officer Luisa Bixio remained with the studio after acquisition.

== Games developed ==
=== As Graffiti ===
Year	Title	Platform(s)
1994	Super Loopz	Super Nintendo Entertainment System
1995	Iron Assault	MS-DOS
1995	Screamer	MS-DOS

=== As Milestone ===
Year	Title	Platform(s)
1996	Screamer 2	MS-DOS
1997	Screamer Rally	MS-DOS, Windows
1999	Superbike World Championship	Windows
2000	Superbike 2000	Windows, PlayStation
2000	Superbike 2001	Windows
2003	Racing Evoluzione	Xbox
2003	L'eredità	Windows, PlayStation 2
2005	Alfa Romeo Racing Italiano	Windows, PlayStation 2, Xbox
2005	The X Factor Sing	Windows, PlayStation 2
2006	Australian Idol Sing	PlayStation 2
2006	Corvette Evolution GT	Windows, PlayStation 2
2006	Super-Bikes Riding Challenge	Windows, PlayStation 2
2006	Suzuki Super-Bikes II: Riding Challenge	Nintendo DS, PlayStation 2
2007	MotoGP 07	PlayStation 2
2007	SBK-07: Superbike World Championship	PlayStation 2, PlayStation 3, PlayStation Portable
2007	Super PickUps	PlayStation 2, Wii
2008	MotoGP 08	Windows, PlayStation 2, PlayStation 3, PlayStation Portable, Wii, Xbox 360
2008	SBK-08: Superbike World Championship	Windows, PlayStation 2, PlayStation 3, PlayStation Portable, Xbox 360
2009	SBK-09: Superbike World Championship	Windows, PlayStation 2, PlayStation 3, PlayStation Portable, Xbox 360
2009	Superstars V8 Racing	Windows, PlayStation 3, Xbox 360
2010	SBK X: Superbike World Championship	Windows, PlayStation 3, Xbox 360
2010	Superstars V8: Next Challenge	Windows, PlayStation 3, Xbox 360
2010	WRC FIA World Rally Championship	Windows, PlayStation 3, Xbox 360
2011	SBK 2011: FIM Superbike World Championship	Windows, PlayStation 3, Xbox 360
2011	WRC 2: FIA World Rally Championship	Windows, PlayStation 3, Xbox 360
2012	MUD: FIM Motocross World Championship	Windows, PlayStation 3, PlayStation Vita, Xbox 360
2012	SBK Generations	Windows, PlayStation 3, Xbox 360
2012	WRC 3: FIA World Rally Championship	Windows, PlayStation 3, PlayStation Vita, Xbox 360
2013	MotoGP 13	Windows, PlayStation 3, PlayStation Vita, Xbox 360
2013	WRC 4: FIA World Rally Championship	Windows, PlayStation 3, PlayStation Vita, Xbox 360
2013	WRC Powerslide	Windows, PlayStation 3, Xbox 360
2013	WRC Shakedown Edition	iOS
2014	MotoGP 14	Windows, PlayStation 3, PlayStation 4, PlayStation Vita, Xbox 360
2014	MXGP: The Official Motocross Videogame	Windows, PlayStation 3, PlayStation 4, PlayStation Vita, Xbox 360
2015	Karate Master 2: Knock Down Blow	Windows
2015	MotoGP 15	Windows, PlayStation 3, PlayStation 4, Xbox 360, Xbox One
2015	Ride	Windows, PlayStation 3, PlayStation 4, Xbox 360, Xbox One
2016	Ducati: 90th Anniversary	Windows, PlayStation 4, Xbox One
2016	MXGP2: The Official Motocross Videogame	Windows, PlayStation 4, Xbox One
2016	Sébastien Loeb Rally EVO	Windows, PlayStation 4, Xbox One
2016	Valentino Rossi: The Game	Windows, PlayStation 4, Xbox One
2017	MotoGP 17	Windows, PlayStation 4, Xbox One
2017	MXGP3: The Official Motocross Videogame	Windows, Nintendo Switch, PlayStation 4, Xbox One
2017	Ride 2	Windows, PlayStation 4, Xbox One
2018	Gravel	Windows, PlayStation 4, Xbox One
2018	Monster Energy Supercross: The Official Videogame	Windows, Nintendo Switch, PlayStation 4, Xbox One
2018	MotoGP 18	Windows, Nintendo Switch, PlayStation 4, Xbox One
2018	MXGP: Pro	Windows, PlayStation 4, Xbox One
2018	Ghostly Matter	Windows
2018	Ride 3	Windows, PlayStation 4, Xbox One
2019	Monster Energy Supercross 2: The Official Videogame	Windows, Nintendo Switch, PlayStation 4, Xbox One
2019	MotoGP 19	Windows, Nintendo Switch, PlayStation 4, Xbox One
2019	MXGP 2019	Windows, PlayStation 4, Xbox One
2020	Monster Energy Supercross 3: The Official Videogame	Windows, Nintendo Switch, PlayStation 4, Stadia, Xbox One
2020	MotoGP 20	Windows, Nintendo Switch, PlayStation 4, Stadia, Xbox One
2020	Ride 4	Windows, PlayStation 4, PlayStation 5, Xbox One, Xbox Series X/S, Amazon Luna
2020	MXGP 2020	Windows, PlayStation 4, PlayStation 5, Xbox One
2021	Monster Energy Supercross: The Official Videogame 4	Windows, PlayStation 4, PlayStation 5, Xbox One, Xbox Series X/S, Stadia
2021	MotoGP 21	Windows, Nintendo Switch, PlayStation 4, PlayStation 5, Xbox One, Xbox Series X/S, Stadia
2021	Hot Wheels Unleashed	Windows, Nintendo Switch, PlayStation 4, PlayStation 5, Xbox One, Xbox Series X/S, Amazon Luna
2021	MXGP 2021	Windows, PlayStation 4, PlayStation 5, Xbox One, Xbox Series X/S
2022	Monster Energy Supercross: The Official Videogame 5	Windows, PlayStation 4, PlayStation 5, Xbox One, Xbox Series X/S
2022	MotoGP 22	Windows, Nintendo Switch, PlayStation 4, PlayStation 5, Xbox One, Xbox Series X/S
2022	SBK 22	Windows, PlayStation 4, PlayStation 5, Xbox One, Xbox Series X/S
2023	Monster Energy Supercross: The Official Videogame 6	Windows, PlayStation 4, PlayStation 5, Xbox One, Xbox Series X/S
2023	MotoGP 23	Windows, Nintendo Switch, PlayStation 4, PlayStation 5, Xbox One, Xbox Series X/S
2023	Ride 5	Windows, PlayStation 5, Xbox Series X/S
2023	Hot Wheels Unleashed 2: Turbocharged	Windows, Nintendo Switch, PlayStation 4, PlayStation 5, Xbox One, Xbox Series X/S
2024	MotoGP 24	Windows, Nintendo Switch, PlayStation 4, PlayStation 5, Xbox One, Xbox Series X/S
2024	Monster Jam Showdown	Windows, Nintendo Switch, PlayStation 4, PlayStation 5, Xbox One, Xbox Series X/S
2025	MotoGP 25	Windows, Nintendo Switch, PlayStation 4, PlayStation 5, Xbox One, Xbox Series X/S
2025	Monster Energy Supercross 25	Windows, PlayStation 5, Xbox Series X/S
2026	Ride 6	Windows, PlayStation 5, Xbox Series X/S
2026	Screamer	Windows, PlayStation 5, Xbox Series X/S
2026	MotoGP 26	Windows, PlayStation 5, Xbox Series X/S
2026	Hot Wheels Infinite Rush	Windows, Nintendo Switch 2, PlayStation 5, Xbox Series X/S

=== Cancelled titles ===
Title	Platform(s)
FX Racing	GameCube, Windows, PlayStation 2
Lamborghini FX	Windows, PlayStation 2, Xbox
SBK-07: Superbike World Championship	Windows, Xbox 360
SBK-08: Superbike World Championship	Nintendo DS, Wii
