= MXGP: The Official Motocross Videogame =

2014 racing video game

MXGP series
- Developer: Milestone
- Publisher: Milestone
- Platforms: Microsoft Windows; PlayStation 3 PlayStation 4 PlayStation Vita; Xbox 360; Xbox One; Nintendo Switch; MacOS; Linux; PlayStation 5 Xbox Series X/S
- Release: 28 March 2014; 7 April 2016; 30 May 2017; 29 June 2018; 16 December 2020; 30 November 2021; 28 November 2024
- Genre: Racing
- Modes: Single-player, multiplayer

MXGP: The Official Motocross Videogame is the first in a series of racing video games developed and published by Milestone. It was released worldwide on 18 November 2014 for Microsoft Windows, PlayStation 3, PlayStation 4, PlayStation Vita and Xbox 360. The game is based on the 2013 FIM Motocross World Championship and includes 14 tracks (including Arco, Trentino, Sevlievo and Loket) and features deformable terrain.

The third installment in the series, now MXGP3 and dropping "The Official Videogame" from its title, was released on 12 May 2017 for Microsoft Windows, PlayStation 4, and Xbox One. It was released in November 2017 for Nintendo Switch. MacOS and Linux ports by Virtual Programming were released in November 2018.

The series was retitled MXGP Pro for its 29 June 2018. This title is available for Microsoft Windows, PlayStation 4, and Xbox One. The series was once again retitled for its 27 August 2019 iteration, released as MXGP 2019. This release was available for Microsoft Windows, PlayStation 4, and Xbox One.

== Games ==
Aggregate review scores
| Game | Metacritic |
|---|---|
| MXGP: The Official Motocross Videogame | (PS3) 67/100 (PS4) 66/100 (X360) 68/100 |
| MXGP2: The Official Motocross Videogame | (PS4) 65/100 (XBO) 59/100 |
| MXGP3: The Official Motocross Videogame | (PS4) 67/100 (XBO) 78/100 |
| MXGP Pro | (PS4) 64/100 (XBO) 72/100 |
| MXGP 2019 | (PC) 72/100 (PS4) 68/100 (XBO) 70/100 |
| MXGP 2020 - The Official Motocross Videogame | (PC) 70/100 (PS5) 70/100 |
| MXGP 2021 - The Official Motocross Videogame | (PS5) 73/100 (XSX) 75/100 |

| Year | Title | Platform(s) |
|---|---|---|
| 2014 | MXGP: The Official Motocross Videogame | Microsoft Windows, PlayStation 3, PlayStation 4, PlayStation Vita, Xbox 360 |
| 2016 | MXGP2: The Official Motocross Videogame | Microsoft Windows, PlayStation 4, Xbox One |
| 2017 | MXGP3: The Official Motocross Videogame | Linux, macOS, Microsoft Windows, Nintendo Switch, PlayStation 4, Xbox One |
| 2018 | MXGP Pro | Microsoft Windows, PlayStation 4, Xbox One |
| 2019 | MXGP 2019 | Microsoft Windows, PlayStation 4, Xbox One |
| 2020 | MXGP 2020 - The Official Motocross Videogame | Microsoft Windows, PlayStation 4, PlayStation 5, Xbox One |
| 2021 | MXGP 2021 - The Official Motocross Videogame | Microsoft Windows, PlayStation 4, PlayStation 5, Xbox One, Xbox Series X/S |
| 2024 | MXGP 2024 - The Official Game | Microsoft Windows, PlayStation 5, Xbox Series X/S |
