= List of Bandai Namco video games =

This is a list of games developed and/or published by Bandai Namco Entertainment and generally covers titles released after March 31, 2006. Games published by Bandai or Namco prior to the merger are not listed here.

== Video games ==
| Year | Title | Developer(s) | Platforms | Ref. |
|---|---|---|---|---|
| 2006 | Kidou Senshi Gundam Seed Destiny: Rengou vs. Z.A.F.T. II | Capcom | Arcade, PlayStation 2 | |
| 2006 | MotoGP (Note: Published by Sony Computer Entertainment in Europe and Australia.) | Namco | PlayStation Portable | |
| 2006 | Ace Combat Zero: The Belkan War | Namco | PlayStation 2 | |
| 2006 | Naruto: Ultimate Ninja | CyberConnect2 | PlayStation 2 | |
| 2006 | Battle Stadium D.O.N | Eighting; Q Entertainment | GameCube, PlayStation 2 | |
| 2006 | Pac-Man World Rally (Note: Published by Electronic Arts in Europe and Australia.) | Smart Bomb Interactive | PlayStation 2, GameCube, PlayStation Portable, Windows | |
| 2006 | Snoopy Vs. the Red Baron | Smart Bomb Interactive | PlayStation 2, PlayStation Portable, Windows | |
| 2006 | Tales of the Abyss | Namco | PlayStation 2, Nintendo 3DS | |
| 2006 | Gunpey | Koto Laboratory | Nintendo DS, PlayStation Portable | |
| 2006 | .hack//G.U. Vol. 1//Rebirth | CyberConnect2 | PlayStation 2 | |
| 2006 | Ace Combat X: Skies of Deception | Access Games | PlayStation Portable | |
| 2006 | Digimon World DS | BEC | Nintendo DS | |
| 2006 | Dragon Ball Z: Budokai Tenkaichi 2 (Note: Published by Atari in North America and Australia.) | Spike | PlayStation 2, Wii | |
| 2006 | Mobile Suit Gundam: Crossfire | BEC | PlayStation 3 | |
| 2006 | Naruto: Uzumaki Chronicles | Cavia | PlayStation 2 | |
| 2006 | Ridge Racer 7 | Namco Bandai Games | PlayStation 3 | |
| 2006 | Super Dragon Ball Z | Arika | PlayStation 2 | |
| 2006 | Tamagotchi Connection: Corner Shop | NanaOn-Sha | Nintendo DS | |
| 2006 | Tamagotchi Connection: Corner Shop 2 | NanaOn-Sha | Nintendo DS | |
| 2006 | Xenosaga Episode III: Also sprach Zarathustra | Monolith Soft | PlayStation 2 | |
| 2006 | Mage Knight: Destiny's Soldier | Big Blue Bubble | Nintendo DS | |
| 2006 | Kidō Senshi Gundam: Senjō no Kizuna | Banpresto | Arcade, PlayStation Portable | |
| 2006 | One Piece: Grand Adventure | Ganbarion | GameCube, PlayStation 2 | |
| 2006 | IGPX: Immortal Grand Prix | Sting Entertainment | PlayStation 2 | |
| 2006 | The Fast and the Furious (Note: Published by Electronic Arts (PS2) and Deep Silver (PSP) in Europe and Australia.) | Eutechnyx | PlayStation 2, PlayStation Portable | |
| 2006 | Mage Knight: Apocalypse (Note: Published by Deep Silver in Europe and Australia.) | InterServ International | Windows | |
| 2006 | Warhammer: Mark of Chaos | Black Hole Entertainment | Windows, Xbox 360 | |
| 2007 | Animal Kaiser | Bandai Namco Games | Arcade | |
| 2007 | Inuyasha: Secret of the Divine Jewel | Art; Frontier Groove | Nintendo DS | |
| 2007 | The Legend of Heroes III: Song of the Ocean | Nihon Falcom | PlayStation Portable | |
| 2007 | Dynasty Warriors: Gundam | Omega Force | PlayStation 2, PlayStation 3, Xbox 360 | |
| 2007 | Mario Kart Arcade GP 2 | Bandai Namco Games | Arcade | |
| 2007 | Nodame Cantabile | Dimps | Nintendo DS | |
| 2007 | The Idolmaster | Metro | Xbox 360 | |
| 2007 | .hack//G.U. Vol. 2//Reminisce | CyberConnect2 | PlayStation 2 | |
| 2007 | Naruto: Ultimate Ninja 2 | CyberConnect2 | PlayStation 2 | |
| 2007 | Naruto: Ultimate Ninja Heroes | CyberConnect2 | PlayStation Portable | |
| 2007 | Tales of the Tempest | Dimps; Namco Tales Studio | Nintendo DS | |
| 2007 | Tales of the World: Radiant Mythology | Alfa System | PlayStation Portable | |
| 2007 | Mizuiro Blood | Namco Bandai Games | Nintendo DS | |
| 2007 | Naruto: Uzumaki Chronicles 2 | Cavia | PlayStation 2 | |
| 2007 | Soulcalibur Legends | Project Soul | Wii | |
| 2007 | .hack//G.U. Vol. 3//Redemption | CyberConnect2 | PlayStation 2 | |
| 2007 | Eternal Sonata | tri-Crescendo | PlayStation 3, Xbox 360 | |
| 2007 | Digimon World Dawn and Dusk | BEC | Nintendo DS | |
| 2007 | Namco Museum DS | M2 | Nintendo DS | |
| 2007 | Trioncube | Bandai Namco Games | Nintendo DS | |
| 2007 | Dragon Ball Z: Budokai Tenkaichi 3 | Spike | PlayStation 2, Wii | |
| 2007 | Dragon Ball Z: Harukanaru Densetsu | BEC | Nintendo DS | |
| 2007 | Beautiful Katamari | Namco Bandai Games | Xbox 360 | |
| 2007 | Ace Combat 6: Fires of Liberation | Project Aces | Xbox 360 | |
| 2007 | Namco Museum Remix | Namco Bandai Games | Wii | |
| 2007 | Nodame Cantabile: Dream Orchestra | Namco Bandai Games | Wii | |
| 2007 | One Piece: Unlimited Adventure | Ganbarion | Wii | |
| 2007 | Hellgate: London (Note: Co-published by Electronic Arts outside Asia.) | Flagship Studios | Windows | |
| 2007 | Tamagotchi: Party On! | h.a.n.d | Wii | |
| 2007 | Tekken 6 | Namco Bandai Games | Arcade, PlayStation 3, Xbox 360, PlayStation Portable | |
| 2007 | Wangan Midnight Maximum Tune 3 | Namco Bandai Games | Arcade | |
| 2007 | Wangan Midnight Maximum Tune 3 DX | Namco Bandai Games | Arcade | |
| 2008 | Tales of Innocence | Namco Bandai Games | Nintendo DS | |
| 2008 | We Ski | Namco Bandai Games | Wii | |
| 2008 | Naruto: Ultimate Ninja 3 | CyberConnect2 | PlayStation 2 | |
| 2008 | Naruto: Ultimate Ninja Heroes 2: The Phantom Fortress | CyberConnect2 | PlayStation Portable | |
| 2008 | Naruto: Ultimate Ninja Storm | CyberConnect2 | PlayStation 3 | |
| 2008 | Super Robot Wars Z | Namco Bandai | PlayStation 2 | |
| 2008 | Soulcalibur IV | Project Soul | PlayStation 3, Xbox 360 | |
| 2008 | Super Robot Wars OG Saga: Endless Frontier | Monolith Soft | Nintendo DS | |
| 2008 | Digimon World Championship | Epics | Nintendo DS | |
| 2008 | Mobile Ops: The One Year War | Dimps | Xbox 360 | |
| 2008 | Tales of Symphonia: Dawn of the New World | Namco Tales Studio | Wii | |
| 2008 | Tales of Vesperia | Namco Tales Studio | Xbox 360, PlayStation 3, Windows, Nintendo Switch, PlayStation 4, Xbox One | |
| 2008 | Tales of Hearts | Namco Tales Studio | Nintendo DS | |
| 2008 | The Idolmaster Live For You! | Namco Bandai Games | Xbox 360 | |
| 2008 | Dragon Ball: Origins | Game Republic | Nintendo DS | |
| 2008 | Dragon Ball Z: Burst Limit | Dimps | PlayStation 3, Xbox 360 | |
| 2008 | Dragon Ball Z: Infinite World | Dimps | PlayStation 2 | |
| 2008 | Mario Super Sluggers | Namco Bandai Games; Now Production | Wii | |
| 2008 | Dynasty Warriors: Gundam 2 | Omega Force | PlayStation 2, PlayStation 3, Xbox 360 | |
| 2008 | Klonoa | Paon | Wii | |
| 2009 | Afro Samurai | Namco Bandai Games | PlayStation 3, Xbox 360 | |
| 2009 | Naruto Shippuden: Ultimate Ninja 4 | CyberConnect2 | PlayStation 2 | |
| 2009 | Naruto Shippuden: Ultimate Ninja 5 | CyberConnect2 | PlayStation 2 | |
| 2009 | Namco Museum Essentials | Namco Bandai Games | PlayStation 3 | |
| 2009 | Dragonball Evolution | Dimps | PlayStation Portable | |
| 2009 | Dragon Ball: Raging Blast | Spike | PlayStation 3, Xbox 360 | |
| 2009 | Dragon Ball: Revenge of King Piccolo | Media.Vision | Wii | |
| 2009 | Dragon Ball Z: Attack of the Saiyans | Monolith Soft | Nintendo DS | |
| 2009 | MagnaCarta 2 | Softmax | Xbox 360 | |
| 2009 | Kamen Rider: Climax Heroes | Eighting | PlayStation 2 | |
| 2009 | Kamen Rider: Climax Heroes W | Eighting | Wii | |
| 2009 | Go! Go! Cosmo Cops! | Noise | Nintendo DS | |
| 2009 | One Piece: Unlimited Cruise | Ganbarion | Wii | |
| 2009 | Soulcalibur: Broken Destiny (Note: Published by Ubisoft in Europe and Australia.) | Project Soul | PlayStation Portable | |
| 2009 | Tales of VS | Namco Tales Studio; Matrix Software | PlayStation Portable | |
| 2009 | Super Robot Wars Z: Special Disk | Banpresoft | PlayStation 2 | |
| 2009 | Super Robot Wars K | Banpresoft | Nintendo DS | |
| 2009 | Tekken 6: Bloodline Rebellion | Namco Bandai Games | Arcade, PlayStation Portable, PlayStation 3, Xbox 360 | |
| 2009 | The Idolmaster SP | Namco Bandai Games | PlayStation Portable | |
| 2009 | SuperRobo Gakuen | Banpresoft | Nintendo DS | |
| 2009 | The Idolmaster Dearly Stars | Microvision | Nintendo DS | |
| 2009 | Super Robot Wars NEO | Sazanami | Wii | |
| 2009 | The Munchables | Namco Bandai Games | Wii | |
| 2009 | Katamari Forever | Genki | PlayStation 3 | |
| 2009 | Food Network: Cook or Be Cooked | Red Fly Studio | Wii | |
| 2009 | Tank! Tank! Tank! | Namco Bandai Games | Arcade, Wii U | |
| 2009 | Fragile: Farewell Ruins of the Moon | Namco; Tri-Crescendo | Wii | |
| 2009 | Tales of the World: Radiant Mythology 2 | Alfa System | PlayStation Portable | |
| 2009 | Tales of Graces | Namco Tales Studio | Wii | |
| 2009 | Element Hunters | Climax Entertainment | Nintendo DS | |
| 2009 | Taiko no Tatsujin 13 | Namco | Arcade | |
| 2010 | God Eater Burst | Shift | PlayStation Portable | |
| 2010 | Muscle March | Namco Bandai Games | Wii | |
| 2010 | Noby Noby Boy | Keita Takahashi | PlayStation 3, iOS | |
| 2010 | Dragon Ball: Origins 2 | Game Republic | Nintendo DS | |
| 2010 | Dragon Ball: Raging Blast 2 | Spike | PlayStation 3, Xbox 360 | |
| 2010 | Dragon Ball Z: Tenkaichi Tag Team | Spike | PlayStation Portable | |
| 2010 | Enslaved: Odyssey to the West | Ninja Theory | PlayStation 3, Xbox 360 | |
| 2010 | Clash of the Titans | Game Republic | PlayStation 3, Xbox 360 | |
| 2010 | God Eater Burst | Shift | PlayStation Portable | |
| 2010 | .hack//Link | CyberConnect2 | PlayStation Portable | |
| 2010 | Gundam Battle Universe | Artdink | PlayStation Portable | |
| 2010 | Kamen Rider: Climax Heroes OOO | Eighting | PlayStation Portable, Wii | |
| 2010 | Super Robot Wars L | Banpresoft | Nintendo DS | |
| 2010 | Dead to Rights: Retribution | Volatile Games | PlayStation 3, Xbox 360 | |
| 2010 | Splatterhouse | Namco Bandai Games | PlayStation 3, Xbox 360 | |
| 2010 | Battle Spirits: Heroes Soul | Climax Entertainment | PlayStation Portable | |
| 2010 | Wangan Midnight Maximum Tune 3 DX PLUS | Xeen | Arcade | |
| 2010 | Tales of Graces f | Namco Tales Studio | PlayStation 3 | |
| 2010 | Tales of Phantasia: Narikiri Dungeon X | Namco Tales Studio | PlayStation Portable | |
| 2010 | Super Robot Wars OG Saga: Endless Frontier Exceed | Monolith Soft | Nintendo DS | |
| 2010 | Naruto Shippuden: Ultimate Ninja Heroes 3 | CyberConnect2 | PlayStation Portable | |
| 2010 | Naruto Shippuden: Ultimate Ninja Storm 2 | CyberConnect2 | PlayStation 3, Xbox 360 | |
| 2010 | Pac-Man Party | Namco Bandai Games | Wii, Nintendo 3DS | |
| 2010 | Majin and the Forsaken Kingdom | Game Republic | PlayStation 3, Xbox 360 | |
| 2010 | Dynasty Warriors: Gundam 3 | Omega Force | PlayStation 3, Xbox 360 | |
| 2010 | Solatorobo: Red the Hunter | CyberConnect2 | Nintendo DS | |
| 2010 | Puzzle Quest 2 (Note: D3 Publisher title, published by Namco Bandai Games in Europe and Australia.) | Infinite Interactive | Nintendo DS | |
| 2010 | Despicable Me: The Game | Monkey Bar Games | PlayStation 2, Wii, PlayStation Portable | |
| 2010 | Despicable Me: The Game - Minion Mayhem | 1st Playable Productions | Nintendo DS | |
| 2010 | Family Party: Fitness Fun (Note: Published by D3 Publisher in North America, remains under D3 label in Europe and Australia, but is published by Namco Bandai.) | Tamsoft | Wii | |
| 2010 | Ben 10 Ultimate Alien: Cosmic Destruction | Papaya Studio | PlayStation 2, PlayStation 3, Wii, Xbox 360, PlayStation Portable | |
| 2010 | Ben 10 Ultimate Alien: Cosmic Destruction | Griptonite Games | Nintendo DS | |
| 2011 | Ni no Kuni: Wrath of the White Witch | Level-5 | Windows, PlayStation 3, PlayStation 4, Nintendo Switch, Xbox One, Xbox Series X/S | |
| 2011 | Dragon Ball Heroes | Bandai | Arcade | |
| 2011 | Dragon Ball Kai: Ultimate Butoden | Game Republic | Nintendo DS | |
| 2011 | Dragon Ball Z: Ultimate Tenkaichi | Spike | PlayStation 3, Xbox 360 | |
| 2011 | Tales of the World: Radiant Mythology 3 | Alfa System | PlayStation Portable | |
| 2011 | The Idolmaster 2 | Bandai Namco Games | PlayStation 3, Xbox 360 | |
| 2011 | Ridge Racer 3D | Bandai Namco Games | Nintendo 3DS | |
| 2011 | Knights Contract | Game Republic | PlayStation 3, Xbox 360 | |
| 2011 | Mobile Suit Gundam: Extreme Vs. | Namco Bandai Games | PlayStation 3 | |
| 2011 | 2nd Super Robot Wars Z | B.B. Studio | PlayStation Portable | |
| 2011 | Dark Souls | FromSoftware | Windows, PlayStation 3, Xbox 360 | |
| 2011 | Go Vacation | Namco Bandai Games | Wii | |
| 2011 | Kamen Rider: Climax Heroes Fourze | Eighting | Wii, Nintendo 3DS | |
| 2011 | Ace Combat: Assault Horizon | Project Aces | Windows, PlayStation 3, Xbox 360 | |
| 2011 | Tales of Xillia | Namco Tales Studio | PlayStation 3 | |
| 2011 | Wangan Midnight Maximum Tune 4 | Genki | Arcade | |
| 2011 | Another Century's Episode Portable | FromSoftware | PlayStation Portable | |
| 2011 | Ridge Racer Vita | Cellius | PlayStation Vita | |
| 2011 | DualPenSports | indies zero | Nintendo 3DS | |
| 2011 | Naruto Shippuden: Ultimate Ninja Impact | CyberConnect2 | PlayStation Portable | |
| 2011 | Power Rangers Samurai | Inti Creates | Nintendo DS, Wii | |
| 2011 | Tekken Tag Tournament 2 | Bandai Namco Games | PlayStation 3, Xbox 360, Arcade, Wii U | |
| 2011 | Yogi Bear: The Game | Monkey Bar Games | Wii | |
| 2011 | Yogi Bear: The Game | 1st Playable Productions | Nintendo DS | |
| 2011 | Gods Eater Burst (Note: Published by D3 Publisher in North America.) | Shift | PlayStation Portable | |
| 2011 | Dream Trigger 3D | Art Co., Ltd. | Nintendo 3DS | |
| 2011 | Earth Defense Force: Insect Armageddon | Vicious Cycle Software | PlayStation 3, Xbox 360, Microsoft Windows | |
| 2011 | Angler's Club: Ultimate Bass Fishing 3D | Tamsoft | Nintendo 3DS | |
| 2011 | Ben 10: Galactic Racing | Monkey Bar Games | PlayStation 3, Xbox 360, Wii, Nintendo 3DS, PlayStation Vita | |
| 2011 | Ben 10: Galactic Racing | Tantalus Media | Nintendo DS | |
| 2011 | Victorious: Hollywood Arts Debut | Behaviour Interactive | Nintendo DS | |
| 2011 | Victorious: Time to Shine | High Voltage Software | Xbox 360 | |
| 2012 | Soulcalibur V | Project Soul | PlayStation 3, Xbox 360 | |
| 2012 | Super Robot Wars OG Saga: Masō Kishin II – Revelation of Evil God | B.B. Studio | PlayStation Portable | |
| 2012 | Dragon Ball Z: For Kinect | Spike Chunsoft | Xbox 360 | |
| 2012 | Dragon Ball Z: Budokai HD Collection | Spike Chunsoft | PlayStation 3, Xbox 360 | |
| 2012 | Tekken 3D: Prime Edition | Bandai Namco Games | Nintendo 3DS | |
| 2012 | Mobile Suit Gundam: Battle Operation | B.B. Studio | PlayStation 3 | |
| 2012 | Power Rangers: Super Samurai | Digifloyd | Xbox 360 | |
| 2012 | Mobile Suit Gundam AGE | Level-5 | PlayStation Portable | |
| 2012 | Ridge Racer Unbounded | Bugbear Entertainment | Windows, PlayStation 3, Xbox 360 | |
| 2012 | Inversion | Saber Interactive | Windows, PlayStation 3, Xbox 360 | |
| 2012 | Kamen Rider: Super Climax Heroes | Eighting | PlayStation Portable, Wii | |
| 2012 | Mobile Suit Gundam Unicorn | FromSoftware | PlayStation 3 | |
| 2012 | Tales of the Heroes: Twin Brave | Bandai Namco Games | PlayStation Portable | |
| 2012 | Project X Zone | Monolith Soft | Nintendo 3DS | |
| 2012 | Mobile Suit Gundam SEED: Battle Destiny | B.B. Studio | PlayStation Vita | |
| 2012 | ThunderCats | Aspect | Nintendo DS | |
| 2012 | One Piece: Pirate Warriors | Omega Force | PlayStation 3 | |
| 2012 | Armored Core V | FromSoftware | PlayStation 3, Xbox 360 | |
| 2012 | Time and Eternity | Imageepoch | PlayStation 3 | |
| 2012 | The Idolmaster Shiny Festa | Bandai Namco Studios | PlayStation Portable | |
| 2012 | Accel World: Ginyoku no Kakusei | B.B. Studio | PlayStation Portable, PlayStation 3 | |
| 2012 | 2nd Super Robot Wars Original Generation | Tose; B.B. Studio | PlayStation 3 | |
| 2012 | Tales of Innocence R | Alfa System | PlayStation Vita | |
| 2012 | Tales of Xillia 2 | Bandai Namco Studios | PlayStation 3 | |
| 2012 | Mobile Suit Gundam: Extreme Vs. Full Boost | Bandai Namco Studios | PlayStation 3, Arcade | |
| 2012 | Taiko no Tatsujin | Bandai Namco Studios | Arcade | |
| 2012 | Naruto Shippuden: Ultimate Ninja Storm Generations | CyberConnect2 | PlayStation 3, Xbox 360 | |
| 2012 | Madagascar 3: The Video Game | Monkey Bar Games | PlayStation 3, Xbox 360, Wii, Nintendo DS, Nintendo 3DS | |
| 2012 | iCarly: Groovy Foodie! | WayForward Technologies | Nintendo DS | |
| 2012 | Winx Club: Magical Fairy Party | 1st Playable Productions | Nintendo DS | |
| 2012 | Victorious: Taking the Lead | High Voltage Software | Wii | |
| 2012 | Victorious: Taking the Lead | 1st Playable Productions | Nintendo DS | |
| 2012 | Ben 10: Omniverse | Monkey Bar Games, 1st Playable Productions | PlayStation 3, Xbox 360, Wii, Wii U | |
| 2012 | Ben 10: Omniverse | 1st Playable Productions | Nintendo DS, Nintendo 3DS | |
| 2012 | Rise of the Guardians: The Video Game | Torus Games | PlayStation 3, Xbox 360, Wii, Wii U, Nintendo DS, Nintendo 3DS | |
| 2012 | Family Party: 30 Great Games Obstacle Arcade | Art Co., Ltd. | Wii U | |
| 2013 | Digimon Adventure | Prope | PlayStation Portable | |
| 2013 | Accel World: Kasoku no Chōten | B.B. Studio | PlayStation Portable, PlayStation 3 | |
| 2013 | Gintama no Sugoroku | Tabot | PlayStation Portable | |
| 2013 | Super Robot Wars UX | B.B. Studio | Nintendo 3DS | |
| 2013 | Sword Art Online: Infinity Moment | Aquria | PlayStation Portable, PlayStation Vita | |
| 2013 | Super Robot Wars Operation Extend | B.B. Studio | PlayStation Portable | |
| 2013 | Super Robot Wars OG Saga: Masō Kishin III – Pride of Justice | B.B. Studio | PlayStation 3, PlayStation Vita | |
| 2013 | One Piece: Pirate Warriors 2 | Omega Force | PlayStation 3, PlayStation Vita | |
| 2013 | Star Trek | Digital Extremes | Windows, PlayStation 3, Xbox 360 | |
| 2013 | Saint Seiya: Brave Soldiers | Dimps | PlayStation 3 | |
| 2013 | Naruto Shippuden: Ultimate Ninja Storm 3 | CyberConnect2 | Windows, PlayStation 3, Xbox 360 | |
| 2013 | Tekken Revolution | Namco Bandai Games | PlayStation 3 | |
| 2013 | Super Robot Wars OG Infinite Battle | B.B. Studio | PlayStation 3 | |
| 2013 | Mario Kart Arcade GP DX | Namco Bandai Games | Arcade | |
| 2013 | Power Rangers Megaforce | Aspect | Nintendo 3DS | |
| 2013 | Disney Magical World (Note: Published by Nintendo outside Japan.) | h.a.n.d. Bandai Namco Games | Nintendo 3DS | |
| 2013 | Gundam Breaker | Banpresto; B.B. Studio | PlayStation 3, PlayStation Vita | |
| 2013 | Dynasty Warriors: Gundam Reborn | Omega Force | PlayStation 3, PlayStation Vita | |
| 2013 | Pac-Man and the Ghostly Adventures | Monkey Bar Games | Xbox 360, Windows, PlayStation 3, Wii U, Nintendo 3DS | |
| 2013 | Macross 30: Voices across the Galaxy | Artdink | PlayStation 3 | |
| 2013 | JoJo's Bizarre Adventure: All Star Battle | CyberConnect2 | PlayStation 3 | |
| 2013 | Armored Core: Verdict Day | FromSoftware | PlayStation 3, Xbox 360 | |
| 2013 | God Eater 2 | Shift | PlayStation Portable, PlayStation Vita | |
| 2013 | Taiko no Tatsujin: Wii U Version | Bandai Namco Studios | Wii U | |
| 2013 | One Piece: Unlimited World Red | Ganbarion | Nintendo 3DS, PlayStation 3, PlayStation 4, PlayStation Vita, Wii U, Nintendo Switch, Windows | |
| 2013 | The Croods: Prehistoric Party! | Torus Games | Wii, Wii U, Nintendo DS, Nintendo 3DS | |
| 2013 | Turbo: Super Stunt Squad | Monkey Bar Games, Torus Games | PlayStation 3, Xbox 360, Wii, Wii U, Nintendo DS, Nintendo 3DS | |
| 2013 | Turbo: Super Stunt Squad | Torus Games | Nintendo DS, Nintendo 3DS | |
| 2013 | Regular Show: Mordecai and Rigby In 8-Bit Land | WayForward Technologies | Nintendo 3DS | |
| 2013 | Ben 10: Omniverse 2 | High Voltage Software | PlayStation 3, Xbox 360, Wii, Wii U | |
| 2013 | Ben 10: Omniverse 2 | 1st Playable Productions | Nintendo 3DS | |
| 2013 | Adventure Time: Explore the Dungeon Because I Don't Know! | WayForward Technologies | PlayStation 3, Xbox 360, Wii U, Microsoft Windows, Nintendo 3DS | |
| 2014 | Dragon Ball Z: Battle of Z | Artdink | PlayStation 3, PlayStation Vita, Xbox 360 | |
| 2014 | Super Heroine Chronicle | Banpresto | PlayStation 3, PlayStation Vita | |
| 2014 | Tales of Hearts R | Namco Tales Studio | PlayStation Vita | |
| 2014 | Wangan Midnight Maximum Tune 5 | Genki | Arcade | |
| 2014 | Mobile Suit Gundam Side Stories | B.B. Studio | PlayStation 3 | |
| 2014 | Mobile Suit Gundam Side Story: Missing Link | B.B. Studio | PlayStation 3 | |
| 2014 | CV: Casting Voice | Crafts & Meister | PlayStation 3 | |
| 2014 | Mobile Suit Gundam: Extreme Vs. Maxi Boost | Bandai Namco Studios | Arcade | |
| 2014 | Dark Souls II | FromSoftware | Windows, PlayStation 3, Xbox 360 | |
| 2014 | Taiko no Tatsujin: Don to Katsu no Jikū Daibōken | Bandai Namco Games | Nintendo 3DS | |
| 2014 | Tenkai Knights: Brave Battle | Delta Arts | Nintendo 3DS | |
| 2014 | 3rd Super Robot Wars Z | B.B. Studio | PlayStation Vita | |
| 2014 | Ace Combat Infinity | Project Aces | PlayStation 3 | |
| 2014 | Sword Art Online: Hollow Fragment | Aquria | PlayStation Vita | |
| 2014 | Super Robot Wars OG Saga: Masō Kishin F – Coffin of the End | B.B. Studio | PlayStation 3 | |
| 2014 | Gundam Breaker 2 | Crafts & Meister | PlayStation 3, PlayStation Vita | |
| 2014 | Soulcalibur: Lost Swords | Project Soul | PlayStation 3 | |
| 2014 | Pac-Man and the Ghostly Adventures 2 | Monkey Bar Games | Nintendo 3DS, PlayStation 3, Wii U, Xbox 360 | |
| 2014 | Naruto Shippuden: Ultimate Ninja Storm Revolution | CyberConnect2 | Windows, PlayStation 3, Xbox 360 | |
| 2014 | Tales of the World: Tactics Union | Jupiter | Wii | |
| 2014 | Power Rangers Super Megaforce | 7th Chord | Nintendo 3DS | |
| 2014 | Digimon All-Star Rumble | Prope | PlayStation 3, Xbox 360 | |
| 2014 | J-Stars Victory VS | Spike Chunsoft | PlayStation 3, PlayStation 4, PlayStation Vita | |
| 2014 | Star Wars Battle Pod | Bandai Namco Games | Arcade | |
| 2014 | One Piece: Super Grand Battle! X | Ganbarion | Nintendo 3DS | |
| 2014 | Taiko no Tatsujin: Tokumori! | Bandai Namco Studios | Wii U | |
| 2014 | Godzilla | Natsume Atari | PlayStation 3, PlayStation 4 | |
| 2015 | Ace Combat: Assault Horizon Legacy Plus | Access Games | Nintendo 3DS | |
| 2015 | Tales of Zestiria | Bandai Namco Studios | PlayStation 3, PlayStation 4, Windows | |
| 2015 | Dragon Ball Xenoverse | Dimps | Windows, PlayStation 3, PlayStation 4, Xbox 360, Xbox One | |
| 2015 | Dragon Ball Z: Extreme Butoden | Arc System Works | Nintendo 3DS | |
| 2015 | Super Robot Wars BX | B.B. Studio | Nintendo 3DS | |
| 2015 | Taiko no Tatsujin: V Version | Bandai Namco Studios | PlayStation Vita | |
| 2015 | Taiko no Tatsujin: Atsumete Tomodachi Daisakusen! | Bandai Namco Studios | Wii U | |
| 2015 | God Eater 2: Rage Burst | Shift | Wii U, PlayStation Vita | |
| 2015 | Digimon Story: Cyber Sleuth | Media.Vision | Wii U, PlayStation Vita | |
| 2015 | Disney Magical World 2 (Note: 3DS version published by Nintendo outside Japan.) | h.a.n.d. Bandai Namco Studios | Nintendo 3DS, Nintendo Switch | |
| 2015 | One Piece: Pirate Warriors 3 | Omega Force | PlayStation 3, PlayStation 4, PlayStation Vita, Windows, Nintendo Switch | |
| 2015 | Dark Souls II: Scholar of the First Sin | FromSoftware | PlayStation 3, PlayStation 4, Windows, Xbox 360, Xbox One | |
| 2015 | Cross Ange: Rondo of Angels and Dragons tr. | Shade | PlayStation Vita | |
| 2015 | Gundam Battle Operation Next | B.B. Studio | PlayStation 3, PlayStation 4 | |
| 2015 | Ray Gigant | Experience | PlayStation Vita | |
| 2015 | Lost Reavers | Bandai Namco Studios | Wii U | |
| 2015 | Rise of Incarnates | Bandai Namco Studios | Windows | |
| 2015 | JoJo's Bizarre Adventure: Eyes of Heaven | CyberConnect2 | PlayStation 3, PlayStation 4 | |
| 2015 | Project X Zone 2 | Monolith Soft | Nintendo 3DS | |
| 2015 | Project CARS | Slightly Mad Studios | Windows, PlayStation 4, Xbox One | |
| 2015 | Sword Art Online: Lost Song | Artdink | PlayStation 3, PlayStation 4, PlayStation Vita | |
| 2016 | Wangan Midnight Maximum Tune 5DX | Genki | Arcade | |
| 2016 | Naruto Shippuden: Ultimate Ninja Storm 4 | CyberConnect2 | Windows, PlayStation 4, Xbox One, Nintendo Switch | |
| 2016 | Dark Souls III | FromSoftware | Windows, PlayStation 4, Xbox One | |
| 2016 | One Piece: Burning Blood | Spike Chunsoft | Windows, PlayStation 4, PlayStation Vita, Xbox One | |
| 2016 | Necropolis | Harebrained Schemes | Windows, PlayStation 4, Xbox One | |
| 2016 | Naruto Online | Oasis Games | Windows | |
| 2016 | Super Robot Wars OG: The Moon Dwellers | Banpresto | PlayStation 3, PlayStation 4 | |
| 2016 | Duelyst | Counterplay Games | Windows | |
| 2016 | Taiko no Tatsujin: Dokodon! Mystery Adventure | Bandai Namco Studios | Nintendo 3DS | |
| 2016 | Tales of Berseria | Bandai Namco Studios | Windows, PlayStation 3, PlayStation 4 | |
| 2016 | Sword Art Online: Hollow Realization | Aquria | Windows, PlayStation 4, PlayStation Vita | |
| 2016 | Digimon World: Next Order | B.B. Studio | PlayStation 4, PlayStation Vita, Nintendo Switch, Windows | |
| 2016 | Warhammer 40,000: Eternal Crusade | Behaviour Interactive | PlayStation 4, Xbox One | |
| 2016 | Gundam Breaker 3 | Banpresto | PlayStation 4, PlayStation Vita | |
| 2016 | Dragon Ball Fusions | Ganbarion | Nintendo 3DS | |
| 2016 | Dragon Ball Xenoverse 2 | Dimps | Windows, PlayStation 4, Xbox One, Nintendo Switch, Stadia, PlayStation 5, Xbox Series X/S | |
| 2016 | Mobile Suit Gundam: Extreme Vs-Force | Bandai Namco Studios | PlayStation Vita | |
| 2016 | My Hero Academia: Battle for All | Dimps | Nintendo 3DS | |
| 2016 | Mighty Action X | 7th Chord | Nintendo 3DS | |
| 2017 | Wangan Midnight Maximum Tune 5DX+ | Genki | Arcade | |
| 2017 | Mighty Morphin Power Rangers: Mega Battle | Bamtang Games | PlayStation 4, Xbox One | |
| 2017 | Impact Winter | Mojo Bones | Windows, PlayStation 4, Xbox One | |
| 2017 | Little Nightmares | Tarsier Studios | Windows, PlayStation 4, Xbox One, Nintendo Switch, Stadia | |
| 2017 | Super Robot Wars V | B.B. Studio | PlayStation 4, PlayStation Vita | |
| 2017 | Chroma Squad | Behold Studios | PlayStation 4, Xbox One | |
| 2017 | Tekken 7 | Bandai Namco Studios | Arcade, Windows, PlayStation 4, Xbox One | |
| 2017 | Get Even | The Farm 51 | Windows, PlayStation 4, Xbox One | |
| 2017 | Accel World vs. Sword Art Online: Millennium Twilight | Artdink | PlayStation 4, PlayStation Vita, Windows | |
| 2017 | City Shrouded in Shadow | Granzella | PlayStation 4 | |
| 2017 | Naruto Shippuden: Ultimate Ninja Storm Trilogy | CyberConnect2 | Windows, PlayStation 4, Xbox One, Nintendo Switch | |
| 2017 | Naruto Shippuden: Ultimate Ninja Storm Legacy | CyberConnect2 | Windows, PlayStation 4, Xbox One | |
| 2017 | Little Witch Academia: Chamber of Time | Aplus Games | Windows, PlayStation 4 | |
| 2017 | .hack//G.U. Last Recode | CyberConnect2 | Windows, PlayStation 4 | |
| 2017 | Project CARS 2 | Slightly Mad Studios | Windows, PlayStation 4, Xbox One | |
| 2017 | Summer Lesson | Bandai Namco Studios | PlayStation 4 | |
| 2017 | Taiko no Tatsujin: Drum Session! | Bandai Namco Studios | PlayStation 4 | |
| 2017 | Kamen Rider Climax Fighters | Eighting | PlayStation 4 | |
| 2017 | One Piece: Grand Cruise | Spike Chunsoft | PlayStation 4 | |
| 2017 | Girls und Panzer: Dream Tank Match | Natsume Atari | PlayStation 4 | |
| 2017 | Digimon Story: Cyber Sleuth – Hacker's Memory | Media.Vision | PlayStation 4, PlayStation Vita | |
| 2017 | The Idolmaster: Stella Stage | Bandai Namco Studios | PlayStation 4 | |
| 2018 | Ni no Kuni II: Revenant Kingdom | Level-5 | PlayStation 4, Nintendo Switch, Windows, Xbox One, Xbox Series X/S | |
| 2018 | Shoot Away PRO | Bandai Namco Amusement | Arcade | |
| 2018 | Sword Art Online: Replication Project | NTT Docomo | PlayStation 4 | |
| 2018 | Dark Souls: Remastered | FromSoftware | PlayStation 4, Xbox One, Nintendo Switch | |
| 2018 | Wangan Midnight Maximum Tune 6 | Genki | Arcade | |
| 2018 | Super Robot Wars X | B.B. Studio | Windows, PlayStation 4, PlayStation Vita, Nintendo Switch | |
| 2018 | Mobile Suit Gundam: Battle Operation 2 | B.B. Studio | PlayStation 4 | |
| 2018 | Naruto to Boruto: Shinobi Striker | Soleil Ltd. | Windows, PlayStation 4, PlayStation Vita, Xbox One | |
| 2018 | Dragon Ball FighterZ | Arc System Works | Windows, PlayStation 4, Xbox One, Nintendo Switch | |
| 2018 | New Gundam Breaker | Crafts & Meister | PlayStation 4 | |
| 2018 | Katamari Damacy Reroll | Monkey Craft | Windows, Nintendo Switch, PlayStation 4, Xbox One, Stadia | |
| 2018 | Gintama Rumble | Tamsoft | PlayStation 4, PlayStation Vita | |
| 2018 | Full Metal Panic! Fight Who Dares Wins | B.B. Studio | PlayStation 4 | |
| 2018 | Record of Grancrest War | Aquria | PlayStation 4 | |
| 2018 | The Seven Deadly Sins: Knights of Britannia | Natsume Atari | PlayStation 4 | |
| 2018 | Dragon Ball Z: X KeeperZ | Bandai Namco Online | Windows | |
| 2018 | Sword Art Online: Fatal Bullet | Dimps | Windows, Nintendo Switch, PlayStation 4, Xbox One | |
| 2018 | God Eater 3 | Bandai Namco Studios; Marvelous First Studio | Windows, Nintendo Switch, PlayStation 4 | |
| 2018 | Black Clover: Project Knights | Ilinx | Windows, PlayStation 4 | |
| 2018 | Divinity: Original Sin II | Larian Studios | PlayStation 4, Xbox One, Nintendo Switch | |
| 2018 | Taiko no Tatsujin: Drum 'n' Fun! | Bandai Namco Studios Dokidoki Groove Works | Nintendo Switch | |
| 2018 | My Hero Academia: One's Justice | Byking | Windows, PlayStation 4, Xbox One, Nintendo Switch | |
| 2018 | Nari Kids Park: HUGtto! PreCure | Natsume Atari | Nintendo Switch | |
| 2018 | Nari Kids Park: Kaitou Sentai Lupinranger VS Keisatsu Sentai Patoranger | Natsume Atari | Nintendo Switch | |
| 2018 | Nari Kids Park: Ultraman R/B | Natsume Atari | Nintendo Switch | |
| 2018 | Black Clover: Quartet Knights | ILINX | PlayStation 4, Xbox One | |
| 2018 | Soulcalibur VI | Bandai Namco Studios; Dimps | Windows, PlayStation 4, Xbox One | |
| 2018 | 11-11: Memories Retold | DigixArt | Windows, PlayStation 4, Xbox One | |
| 2019 | Ace Combat 7: Skies Unknown | Bandai Namco Studios | Windows, PlayStation 4, Xbox One | |
| 2019 | Jump Force | Spike Chunsoft | Windows, PlayStation 4, Xbox One, Nintendo Switch | |
| 2019 | One Piece: World Seeker | Ganbarion | Windows, PlayStation 4, Xbox One | |
| 2019 | Super Robot Wars T | B.B. Studio | Nintendo Switch, PlayStation 4 | |
| 2019 | The Dark Pictures: Man of Medan | Supermassive Games | Windows, PlayStation 4, Xbox One | |
| 2019 | Code Vein | Bandai Namco Studios | Windows, PlayStation 4, Xbox One | |
| 2019 | Ninja Box | Bandai Namco Studios | Nintendo Switch | |
| 2019 | Disney Tsum Tsum Festival | B.B. Studio; Hyde | Nintendo Switch | |
| 2019 | Pac-Man Party Royale | Pastagames | iOS, macOS, tvOS | |
| 2019 | Tokyo Ghoul: re Call to Exist | Three Rings | Windows, PlayStation 4 | |
| 2019 | Doraemon Story of Seasons | Brownies; Marvelous | Windows, Nintendo Switch | |
| 2019 | Rad | Double Fine Productions | Windows, PlayStation 4, Xbox One, Nintendo Switch | |
| 2019 | Bless Unleashed | Neowiz Bless Studio | Xbox One | |
| 2020 | Wangan Midnight Maximum Tune 6R | Bandai Namco Amusement | Arcade | |
| 2020 | Dragon Ball Z: Kakarot | CyberConnect2 | Windows, PlayStation 4, Xbox One, Nintendo Switch, PlayStation 5, Xbox Series X/S | |
| 2020 | One-Punch Man: A Hero Nobody Knows | Spike Chunsoft | Windows, PlayStation 4, Xbox One | |
| 2020 | One Piece: Pirate Warriors 4 | Omega Force | Windows, PlayStation 4, Xbox One, Nintendo Switch | |
| 2020 | My Hero Academia: One's Justice 2 | Byking | Windows, PlayStation 4, Xbox One, Nintendo Switch | |
| 2020 | Sword Art Online: Alicization Lycoris | Aquria | PlayStation 4, Xbox One, Windows | |
| 2020 | Fast & Furious Crossroads | Slightly Mad Studios | PlayStation 4, Xbox One, Windows | |
| 2020 | Captain Tsubasa: Rise of New Champions | Tamsoft | Windows, PlayStation 4, Nintendo Switch | |
| 2020 | Project CARS 3 | Slightly Mad Studios | PlayStation 4, Xbox One, Windows | |
| 2020 | Pac-Man Mega Tunnel Battle | Heavy Iron Studios | Stadia | |
| 2020 | Taiko no Tatsujin: Rhythmic Adventure Pack | Dokidoki Grooveworks | Nintendo Switch | |
| 2020 | The Dark Pictures Anthology: Little Hope | Supermassive Games | Windows, PlayStation 4, Xbox One | |
| 2020 | Twin Mirror | Dontnod Entertainment | Windows, PlayStation 4, Xbox One | |
| 2021 | Little Nightmares II | Tarsier Studios | Windows, PlayStation 4, Xbox One, Nintendo Switch, Stadia, PlayStation 5, Xbox Series X/S | |
| 2021 | Taiko no Tatsujin Pop Tap Beat | Bandai Namco Amusement Labs | iOS, macOS, tvOS | |
| 2021 | Pac-Man 99 | Arika | Nintendo Switch | |
| 2021 | Scarlet Nexus | Bandai Namco Studios | Windows, PlayStation 4, PlayStation 5, Xbox Series X/S, Xbox One | |
| 2021 | Tales of Arise | Bandai Namco Studios | Windows, PlayStation 4, PlayStation 5, Xbox Series X/S, Xbox One, Nintendo Switch 2 | |
| 2021 | Mobile Suit Gundam Battle Operation Code Fairy | B.B. Studio | PlayStation 4, PlayStation 5 | |
| 2021 | The Dark Pictures Anthology: House of Ashes | Supermassive Games | Windows, PlayStation 4, Xbox One, PlayStation 5, Xbox Series X/S, Xbox One | |
| 2021 | The Idolmaster Starlit Season | Bandai Namco Studios | Windows, PlayStation 4 | |
| 2021 | Wangan Midnight Maximum Tune 6RR | Bandai Namco Amusement | Arcade | |
| 2021 | Zoids Wild: Infinity Blast | Takara Tomy | Nintendo Switch | |
| 2022 | Taiko no Tatsujin: The Drum Master! | Bandai Namco Amusement Lab | Windows, Xbox One, Xbox Series X/S | |
| 2022 | Elden Ring | FromSoftware | Windows, PlayStation 5, PlayStation 4, Xbox Series X/S, Xbox One | |
| 2022 | .hack//G.U. Last Recode | CyberConnect2 | Nintendo Switch | |
| 2022 | Pac-Man Museum + | Now Production | Windows, PlayStation 4, Xbox One, Nintendo Switch | |
| 2022 | Klonoa Phantasy Reverie Series | Monkey Craft | Windows, PlayStation 5, Xbox Series X/S, PlayStation 4, Xbox One, Nintendo Switch | |
| 2022 | Digimon Survive | Hyde | Windows, PlayStation 4, Xbox Series X/S, Xbox One, Nintendo Switch | |
| 2022 | SD Gundam Battle Alliance | Artdink | Windows, PlayStation 5, Xbox Series X/S, PlayStation 4, Xbox One, Nintendo Switch | |
| 2022 | Pac-Man World Re-Pac | Now Production | Windows, PlayStation 5, Xbox Series X/S, PlayStation 4, Xbox One, Nintendo Switch | |
| 2022 | JoJo's Bizarre Adventure: All Star Battle R | CyberConnect2 | Windows, PlayStation 5, Xbox Series X/S, PlayStation 4, Xbox One, Nintendo Switch | |
| 2022 | Taiko no Tatsujin: Rhythm Festival | Bandai Namco Amusement Lab | Nintendo Switch, Windows, PlayStation 5, Xbox Series X/S | |
| 2022 | Dragon Ball: The Breakers | Dimps | Windows, PlayStation 4, Xbox One, Nintendo Switch | |
| 2022 | The Dark Pictures Anthology: The Devil in Me | Supermassive Games | Windows, PlayStation 5, Xbox Series X/S, PlayStation 4, Xbox One | |
| 2022 | Doraemon Story of Seasons: Friends of the Great Kingdom | Marvelous | Windows, PlayStation 5, Nintendo Switch | |
| 2022 | Gundam Evolution | Bandai Namco Online | Windows, PlayStation 5, Xbox Series X/S, PlayStation 4, Xbox One | |
| 2022 | Ultimate Kaiju Monster Rancher | Koei Tecmo | Nintendo Switch | |
| 2023 | One Piece Odyssey | ILCA | Windows, PlayStation 4, PlayStation 5, Xbox Series X/S, Nintendo Switch | |
| 2023 | Baten Kaitos 1&2 Remaster | Logicalbeat | Nintendo Switch | |
| 2023 | Tales of Symphonia Remastered | Bandai Namco Entertainment Romania | Nintendo Switch, PlayStation 4, Xbox One | |
| 2023 | SD Shin Kamen Rider Rumble | Natsume-Atari | Windows, Nintendo Switch | |
| 2023 | Blue Protocol | Bandai Namco Studios; Bandai Namco Online | Windows, PlayStation 5, Xbox Series X/S | |
| 2023 | Park Beyond | Limbic Entertainment | Windows, PlayStation 5, Xbox Series X/S | |
| 2023 | Sword Art Online: Last Recollection | Aquria | Windows, PlayStation 4, PlayStation 5, Xbox One, Xbox Series X/S | |
| 2023 | Armored Core VI: Fires of Rubicon | FromSoftware | Windows, PlayStation 5, Xbox Series X/S | |
| 2023 | My Hero Ultra Rumble | Byking | Windows, PlayStation 4, Xbox One, Nintendo Switch | |
| 2023 | Naruto x Boruto: Ultimate Ninja Storm Connections | CyberConnect2 | Windows, Nintendo Switch, PlayStation 4, PlayStation 5, Xbox One, Xbox Series X/S | |
| 2024 | Tamagotchi Adventure Kingdom | Alike Studio | iOS, macOS, tvOS | |
| 2024 | Tekken 8 | Bandai Namco Studios; Arika | Windows, PlayStation 5, Xbox Series X/S | |
| 2024 | Jujutsu Kaisen: Cursed Clash | Byking | Windows, Nintendo Switch, PlayStation 4, PlayStation 5, Xbox One, Xbox Series X/S | |
| 2024 | Sword Art Online: Fractured Daydream | Dimps | Windows, Nintendo Switch, PlayStation 5, Xbox Series X/S | |
| 2024 | Spy × Anya: Operation Memories | Groove Box Japan | Windows, Nintendo Switch, PlayStation 4, PlayStation 5 | |
| 2024 | Pac-Man Mega Tunnel Battle: Chomp Champs | Amber Studio | Windows, Nintendo Switch, PlayStation 4, PlayStation 5, Xbox One, Xbox Series X/S | |
| 2024 | That Time I Got Reincarnated as a Slime ISEKAI Chronicles | ZOC; Monkeycraft | Windows, Nintendo Switch, PlayStation 4, PlayStation 5, Xbox One, Xbox Series X/S | |
| 2024 | Sand Land | ILCA | Windows, PlayStation 4, PlayStation 5, Xbox One, Xbox Series X/S | |
| 2024 | Gundam Breaker 4 | Crafts & Meister | Windows, Nintendo Switch, PlayStation 4, PlayStation 5 | |
| 2024 | Dragon Ball: Sparking! Zero | Spike Chunsoft | Windows, Nintendo Switch 2, PlayStation 5, Xbox Series X/S | |
| 2024 | Unknown 9: Awakening | Reflector Entertainment | Windows, PlayStation 5, Xbox Series X/S | |
| 2024 | Death Note: Killer Within | Grounding | Windows, PlayStation 4, PlayStation 5 | |
| 2025 | Freedom Wars Remastered | Dimps | Windows, Nintendo Switch, PlayStation 4, PlayStation 5 | |
| 2025 | Tales of Graces f Remastered | Tose | Windows, Nintendo Switch, PlayStation 4, PlayStation 5, Xbox One, Xbox Series X/S | |
| 2025 | Synduality: Echo of Ada | Game Studio | Windows, PlayStation 5, Xbox Series X/S | |
| 2025 | Katamari Damacy Rolling Live | Bandai Namco Entertainment | iOS, macOS, tvOS | |
| 2025 | Bleach: Rebirth of Souls | Tamsoft | Windows, PlayStation 4, PlayStation 5, Xbox Series X/S | |
| 2025 | Mobile Suit Gundam SEED Battle Destiny Remastered | Bandai Namco Forge Digitals | Windows, Nintendo Switch | |
| 2025 | Elden Ring Nightreign | FromSoftware | Windows, PlayStation 4, PlayStation 5, Xbox One, Xbox Series X/S | |
| 2025 | Battle Train | Terrible Posture Games, Nerd Ninjas | Windows, Nintendo Switch | |
| 2025 | Tamagotchi Plaza | Hyde | Nintendo Switch, Nintendo Switch 2 | |
| 2025 | Patapon 1+2 Replay | SAS | Windows, Nintendo Switch, PlayStation 5 | |
| 2025 | Shadow Labyrinth | Bandai Namco Studios | Windows, Nintendo Switch, Nintendo Switch 2, PlayStation 5, Xbox Series X/S | |
| 2025 | Super Robot Wars Y | Bandai Namco Forge Digitals | Windows, Nintendo Switch, PlayStation 5 | |
| 2025 | Everybody's Golf Hot Shots | Hyde | Windows, Nintendo Switch, PlayStation 5 | |
| 2025 | Dragon Ball Gekishin Squadra | Ganbarion | Windows, Nintendo Switch, PlayStation 4, PlayStation 5 | |
| 2025 | Towa and the Guardians of the Sacred Tree | Brownies | Windows, Nintendo Switch, PlayStation 5, Xbox Series X/S | |
| 2025 | Pac-Man World 2 Re-Pac | Now Production | Windows, Nintendo Switch, Nintendo Switch 2, PlayStation 4, PlayStation 5, Xbox One, Xbox Series X/S | |
| 2025 | Digimon Story: Time Stranger | Media.Vision | Windows, PlayStation 5, Xbox Series X/S | |
| 2025 | Little Nightmares III | Supermassive Games | Windows, Nintendo Switch, Nintendo Switch 2, PlayStation 4, PlayStation 5, Xbox One, Xbox Series X/S | |
| 2025 | Once Upon a Katamari | Rengame | Windows, Nintendo Switch, PlayStation 5, Xbox Series X/S | |
| 2025 | Tales of Xillia Remastered | DokiDoki Groove Works | Windows, Nintendo Switch, PlayStation 5, Xbox Series X/S | |
| 2026 | Code Vein II | Bandai Namco Studios | Windows, PlayStation 5, Xbox Series X/S | |
| 2026 | My Hero Academia: All's Justice | Byking | Windows, PlayStation 5, Xbox Series X/S | |
| 2026 | Tales of Berseria Remastered | D.A.G | Windows, Nintendo Switch, PlayStation 5, Xbox Series X/S | |
| 2026 | Little Nightmares VR: Altered Echoes | Iconik | Windows, PlayStation 5 | |
| 2026 | Sword Art Online: Echoes of Aincrad | Game Studio | Windows, PlayStation 5, Xbox Series X/S | |
| 2026 | Captain Tsubasa II: World Fighters | Tamsoft | Windows, Nintendo Switch, PlayStation 5, Xbox Series X/S | |
| 2026 | The Blood of Dawnwalker | Rebel Wolves | Windows, PlayStation 5, Xbox Series X/S | |
| 2026 | Ace Combat 8: Wings of Theve | Bandai Namco Aces | Windows, PlayStation 5, Xbox Series X/S | |
| 2026 | Tales of Eternia Remastered | Tose | Windows, Nintendo Switch, Nintendo Switch 2, PlayStation 4, PlayStation 5, Xbox Series X/S | |
| 2026 | One Piece: Grand Gourmet | Kairosoft | Windows, Nintendo Switch, Nintendo Switch 2 | |
| 2026 | Hello Kitty Party Land | Sanrio | Nintendo Switch, Nintendo Switch 2 | |
| 2027 | Biohazard RE:2 Arcade | Bandai Namco Studios | Arcade | |
| 2027 | Dragon Ball Xenoverse 3 | Dimps | Windows, PlayStation 5, Xbox Series X/S | |
| 2027 | Gundam Rogue Orbit | Bandai Namco Studios | Windows, PlayStation 5, Xbox Series X/S | |
| 2027 | Ondeh Ondeh Kaya’s Tasty Tale | Metronomik | Windows, Nintendo Switch 2, PlayStation 5, Xbox Series X/S | |
| TBA | Mobile Suit Gundam Battle Operation 3 | Bandai Namco Forge Digitals | Windows, PlayStation 5 | |
| TBA | Super Robot Wars Z II: Ruination Remastered | Bandai Namco Forge Digitals | TBA | |

=== Mobile games ===
| Title | Year | Platforms | Ref. |
|---|---|---|---|
| Mobile Suit Gundam Area Wars | 2011 | iOS, Android | |
| Digimon Collectors | 2011 | iOS, Android | |
| Bird Zapper! | 2011 | iOS, Android | |
| Super Robot Wars Card Chronicle | 2012 | iOS, Android | |
| One Piece Grand Collection | 2012 | iOS, Android | |
| Digimon Heroes | 2012 | iOS, Android | |
| Tales of Asteria | 2013 | iOS, Android | |
| Tales of Link | 2013 | iOS, Android | |
| Pac-Man Dash! | 2013 | iOS, Android | |
| Ridge Racer Slipstream | 2013 | iOS, Android | |
| Drift Spirits | 2013 | iOS, Android | |
| Little Tail Story | 2014 | iOS, Android | Japan-exclusive; published under the name "Bandai Namco Games" |
| Taiko no Tatsujin + | 2014 | iOS | |
| One Piece Straw Wars Pirates Defence | | iOS, Android | |
| One Piece Grand Quiz Battle | | iOS, Android | |
| One Piece Moja! | | iOS, Android | |
| One Piece Run, Chopper, Run! | 2014 | iOS, Android | |
| One Piece Dance Battle | 2014 | iOS, Android | |
| One Piece Treasure Cruise | 2014 | iOS, Android | |
| Sailor Moon Drops | 2015 | iOS, Android | |
| IDOLiSH7 | 2015 | iOS, Android | |
| One Piece Setting Sail! | 2015 | iOS, Android | |
| Dragon Ball Z: Dokkan Battle | 2015 | iOS, Android | |
| Super Robot Wars X-Ω | 2015 | iOS, Android | |
| One Piece: Thousand Storm | 2016 | iOS, Android | |
| Ridge Racer Draw & Drift | 2016 | iOS, Android | |
| Digimon Links | 2016 | iOS, Android | |
| Tales of the Rays | 2017 | iOS, Android | |
| Sword Art Online: Memory Defrag | 2017 | iOS, Android | |
| LayereD Stories 0 | 2017 | iOS, Android | |
| Saint Seiya: Cosmo Fantasy | 2017 | iOS, Android | |
| Sword Art Online: Integral Factor | 2017 | iOS, Android | |
| Amazing Katamari Damacy | 2017 | iOS, Android | |
| My Tamagotchi Forever | 2018 | iOS, Android | |
| One Piece Bounty Rush | 2018 | iOS, Android | |
| Doctor Who: Battle of Time | 2018 | iOS, Android | |
| Dragon Ball Legends | 2018 | iOS, Android | |
| One Piece: Burning Will | 2018 | iOS, Android | |
| Naruto x Boruto Ninja Voltage | 2018 | iOS, Android | |
| Digimon ReArise | 2018 | iOS, Android | |
| Tales of Crestoria | 2019 | iOS, Android | |
| Sword Art Online: Alicization Rising Steel | 2019 | iOS, Android | |
| World Dai Star: Yume no Stellarium | 2023 | iOS, Android | |
| The Idolm@ster Shiny Colors: Song for Prism | 2023 | iOS, Android | |
| Jump+ Jumble Rush | 2025 | iOS, Android | |
| Bleach Mirrors High | 2026 | iOS, Android | |
| Digimon Up | 2026 | iOS, Android | |
| One Piece: Grand Gourmet | 2026 | iOS, Android | |

=== Namco Bandai Partners titles ===
Titles published and/or distributed outside North America by defunct overseas subsidiary Namco Bandai Partners. While they also handled distribution of Namco Bandai titles outside North America alongside those of D3 Publisher, those will not be included in this list.

| Year | Title | Developer(s) | Publisher(s) | Platforms | Ref. | Additional Note(s) |
|---|---|---|---|---|---|---|
| 2009 | Champions Online | Cryptic Studios | Atari | Microsoft Windows | | Physical distribution in all territories except North America and Japan |
| 2009 | Cities XL | Monte Cristo | Monte Cristo | Microsoft Windows | | Physical distribution in select territories (UK, Nordic regions, Iberica, Italy, Australia and New Zealand), Monte Cristo handled the rest of Europe and all digital rights |
| 2009 | Ju-On: The Grudge | Feelplus | Rising Star Games | Wii | | Distribution in France |
| 2009 | Muramasa: The Demon Blade | Vanillaware | Rising Star Games | Wii | | Distribution in France |
| 2009 | Ghostbusters: The Video Game | Terminal Reality, Red Fly Studio | Atari | Xbox 360, Wii, Microsoft Windows, Nintendo DS | | Distribution in all territories except North America and Japan; Sony Computer Entertainment published and distributed the game for the PlayStation 2, PlayStation 3 and PlayStation Portable |
| 2009 | Easy Piano | Gamelife | Gamelife | Nintendo DS | | European/Australian Distribution |
| 2010 | Star Trek Online | Cryptic Studios | Atari | Microsoft Windows | | Physical distribution in all territories, except North America and Japan |
| 2010 | Winx Club: Believix in You! | ForwardGames | Rainbow Media Pte. Ltd. | Nintendo DS | | European distribution |
| 2010 | Project Runway | Tornado Studios | Atari | Wii | | distribution in all territories, except North America and Japan |
| 2010 | Demon's Souls | FromSoftware | Sony Computer Entertainment | PlayStation 3 | | Published and distributed in all territories outside North America and Asia under license from Sony Computer Entertainment |
| 2010 | Hello Kitty: Birthday Adventures | OneNine Studios | Sanrio Digital | Nintendo DS | | Published and distributed in Europe, Australia and New Zealand |
| 2010 | Winx Club: Rockstars | RIZ Inc. | Rainbow Media Pte. Ltd. | Nintendo DS | | European distribution |
| 2010 | Harvest Moon: Animal Parade | Marvelous Entertainment | Rising Star Games | Wii | | European distribution |
| 2010 | Harvest Moon DS: Sunshine Islands | Marvelous Entertainment | Rising Star Games | Nintendo DS | | European distribution |
| 2011 | Test Drive Unlimited 2 | Eden Games | Atari | PlayStation 3, Xbox 360, Microsoft Windows | | Physical distribution in all territories, except North America and Japan |
| 2011 | Hello Kitty Seasons | Sanrio Digital | Sanrio Digital | Wii | | Published and distributed in Europe, Australia, and New Zealand |
| 2011 | Haunted House | Eden Games | Atari | Wii | | Physical distribution in all territories, except North America and Japan |
| 2011 | Atari Greatest Hits: Volume 1 | Code Mystics | Atari | Nintendo DS | | Physical distribution in all territories, except North America and Japan |
| 2011 | Yoostar 2 | Blitz Games | Yoostar Entertainment Group | | Physical distribution in Western Europe | |
| 2011 | The Witcher 2: Assassins of Kings | CD Projekt Red | CD Projekt | Microsoft Windows | | Physical distribution in Western Europe, Middle East, Australia and New Zealand |
| 2012 | The Witcher 2: Assassins of Kings | CD Projekt Red | CD Projekt | Xbox 360 | | Physical distribution in Western Europe, Middle East, Australia and New Zealand |
| 2012 | RollerCoaster Tycoon 3D | N-Space | Atari | Nintendo 3DS | | Physical distribution in all territories, except North America and Japan |

== Other distributed titles ==
- MotoGP 14, Ride, MotoGP 15, Sébastien Loeb Rally Evo and Valentino Rossi: The Game were developed and published by Milestone srl.
- Lords of the Fallen was developed and published by CI Games.
- F1 2015 was developed and published by Codemasters.
- Project CARS was developed and published by Slightly Mad Studios.
- The Witcher 3: Wild Hunt and Cyberpunk 2077 were developed and published by CD Projekt (PAL regions only).
- Disney Infinity was developed by Avalanche Software and published by Disney Interactive Studios (Japan only)

== See also ==
- List of Namco games
- List of Bandai games
- List of Tales media
- Tales of Mobile
