= Yoshiki Okamoto =

Japanese video game designer (born 1961)

- 岡本 吉起
- Born: June 10, 1961 (age 65); Ainan, Ehime, Japan
- Other name: Kihaji Okamoto
- Education: Sozosha College of Design
- Occupations: Game producer, game designer
- Years active: 1981–present
- Employers: Konami (1981–1983); Capcom (1983–2003); Flagship (1997–2003); Game Republic (2003–2011)
- Known for: Final Fight; Street Fighter series; Darkstalkers series; Monster Strike

Yoshiki Okamoto (岡本 吉起, Okamoto Yoshiki; born June 10, 1961), sometimes credited as Kihaji Okamoto, is a Japanese video game designer. He is credited with producing popular titles for Konami, including Gyruss and Time Pilot, and for Capcom, including 1942, Gun.Smoke, Final Fight and Street Fighter II. He later founded the companies Flagship and Game Republic, and then created the hit mobile games Dragon Hunter and Monster Strike for Mixi. He also played a role in the creation of Rockstar's Red Dead franchise. Several franchises he helped create are among the highest-grossing video game franchises of all time, including Street Fighter, Monster Strike and Red Dead.

== History ==
=== Early career at Konami ===
His early games Time Pilot (1982) and Gyruss (1983) innovated in the shoot 'em up genre during the golden age of arcade games. The Killer List of Videogames included both Gyruss and Time Pilot in its list of top 100 arcade games of all time. Although these games turned out to be successful titles for Konami, Okamoto's employer was not happy as apparently Okamoto had been told to create a driving game instead. Internal disagreements, financial and credible, caused his termination from Konami.

=== Career at Capcom ===
Joining Capcom in 1983 as one of their first game designers, Okamoto directed several arcade games such as 1942 (1984), SonSon (1984), and Side Arms (1986). His 1985 shoot 'em up Gun.Smoke later inspired a spiritual successor, Red Dead Revolver, the first installment of the Red Dead series. He was also responsible for recruiting notable staff like Noritaka Funamizu, Akira Yasuda, and Akira Nishitani for Capcom.

When Capcom split its teams into arcade and console divisions, Okamoto was appointed as the head of the arcade games divison. He was the producer of some of Capcom's biggest arcade hits, most notably the beat 'em up game Final Fight (1989) and fighting game Street Fighter II (1991). Street Fighter II is estimated to have grossed $10.61 billion as of 2017, making it the third highest-grossing video game of all time, after Space Invaders and Pac-Man.

In 1996, Okamoto became Capcom's head of development and oversaw all their games, starting with Resident Evil. In 1997, he established Flagship, a subsidiary company of Capcom that specialized in creating stories for their games.

Okamoto approached Angel Studios with the idea for an original intellectual property entitled S.W.A.T. It later adopted a Western theme at Okamoto's recommendation, redefining the acronym as "Spaghetti Western Action Team". It was intended to be a spiritual successor to Gun.Smoke. Angel Studios began work on the game with Capcom's oversight and funding in 2000, and Capcom announced the game as Red Dead Revolver in March 2002. Okamoto then left Capcom, which canceled the game in August 2003. Rockstar Games acquired the rights to Red Dead Revolver in December 2003 and resumed development, releasing it for the PlayStation 2 and Xbox in May 2004.

In 2003, he left Capcom to form another video game company.

=== Game Republic ===
In 2005, Okamoto's new independent game company, Game Republic, released its first game Genji: Dawn of the Samurai. Genji is a game set in Feudal Japan with a similar playing style to the Onimusha series. A sequel, Genji: Days of the Blade, was released on the PlayStation 3 in late 2006. A new Game Republic game called Folklore (Folkssoul in Japan) was released in 2007.

Okamoto also developed a typical party game called Every Party, which was a launch title for the Xbox 360 in Japan.

In 2007, Game Republic signed with Brash Entertainment and started working on licensed games like Clash of the Titans. But then in November 2008, Brash Entertainment went out of business, and Game Republic had to turn to Namco Bandai for the release of Clash of the Titans.

In 2011, Game Republic also shut down due to debt, and a year later, Okamoto announced that he had retired from making console games and started working on mobile games.

=== Mixi ===
In recent years, he created the mobile games Dragon Hunter and Monster Strike (2013) for Mixi. Dragon Hunter was a moderate success, before Monster Strike became a major hit, competing with Puzzle & Dragons for the top spot on mobile charts. By 2018, Monster Strike had grossed over $7.2 billion, surpassing Puzzle & Dragons to become the highest-grossing mobile app of all time.

=== Later years ===
Okamoto became the chairman of the Japan Game Culture Foundation in November 2017, an organization which seeks to support young game creators. In 2018 he made the Malaysian game development company Okakichi. In November 2022 he was appointed as "game advisor" for the Whole Earth Foundation, a Japanese organization seeking to raise infrastructure maintenance awareness through a cryptocurrency smartphone game.

Since 2020 he has also made three YouTube channels which he uses to discuss various topics. His "YoshikiOkamotoGameCh" channel in particular looks back at his life as a video game designer for over 40 years, discussing experiences with past games he was involved in, his opinion on other games, and interviews with individuals related to game development. He also used this channel to announce his planned retirement in June 2027.

== Influences and style ==
Okamoto has said that he gets ideas from scenery from movies, citing particularly the works of Akira Kurosawa and Chinese ghost stories. He commented that "We don't make games for ourselves - I don't actually play games very much."

== Works ==
Year	Game	Role
1982	Time Pilot	Game designer, graphic artist
1983	Gyruss	Game designer, graphic artist
1984	SonSon	Director, graphic artist
1984	1942	Director, graphic artist
1985	Savage Bees	Director, graphic artist
1985	Gun.Smoke	Director, graphic artist
1986	Hyper Dyne Side Arms	Director, graphic artist
1987	1943: The Battle of Midway	Producer
1987	Black Tiger	Producer
1988	Mahjong Gakuen	Director
1988	Forgotten Worlds	Game designer
1989	Dynasty Wars	Producer
1989	Destiny of an Emperor	Game designer
1989	Willow	Director
1989	U.N. Squadron	Director
1989	Final Fight	Producer
1989	Buster Bros.	Director
1990	1941: Counter Attack	Director
1990	Mega Twins	Director
1990	Magic Sword	Game designer
1990	Nemo	Director
1991	Street Fighter II	Producer
1991	Three Wonders	Producer
1991	The King of Dragons	Producer
1991	Captain Commando	Producer
1991	Knights of the Round	Producer
1992	Varth: Operation Thunderstorm	Director, producer
1992	Warriors of Fate	Producer
1992	Street Fighter II Turbo	Producer
1993	Cadillacs and Dinosaurs	Producer
1993	The Punisher	Producer
1993	Super Street Fighter II	Producer
1994	Super Street Fighter II Turbo	Producer
1994	Eco Fighters	Producer
1994	Darkstalkers: The Night Warriors	Producer
1994	Armored Warriors	Director
1994	X-Men: Children of the Atom	Producer
1995	Street Fighter: The Movie	Executive producer
1995	Night Warriors: Darkstalkers' Revenge	Producer
1995	Marvel Super Heroes	Producer
1996	Star Gladiator	General producer
1996	Mega Man 8	Executive producer
1997	Street Fighter III: New Generation	General producer
1997	Battle Circuit	General producer
1997	Mega Man: Battle & Chase	Executive producer
1997	Vampire Savior	General producer
1997	Mega Man X4	Executive producer
1997	Super Gem Fighter Mini Mix	Executive producer
1997	Breath of Fire III	Executive producer
1997	Street Fighter III: 2nd Impact	General producer
1998	Resident Evil 2	Supervisor
1998	Marvel vs. Capcom: Clash of Super Heroes	Executive producer
1998	Plasma Sword: Nightmare of Bilstein	Executive producer
1998	Mega Man & Bass	Executive producer
1999	Trick'N Snowboarder	Executive producer
1999	Power Stone	Executive producer
1999	Dino Crisis	Supervisor
1999	The Misadventures of Tron Bonne	Executive producer
1999	Resident Evil 3: Nemesis	Supervisor
1999	Strider 2	General producer
2000	Resident Evil - Code: Veronica	Supervisor
2000	Marvel vs. Capcom 2: New Age of Heroes	Executive producer
2000	Breath of Fire IV	Executive producer
2000	Capcom vs. SNK: Millennium Fight 2000	Executive producer
2000	Mega Man X5	Executive producer
2001	The Legend of Zelda: Oracle of Seasons	General producer
2001	The Legend of Zelda: Oracle of Ages	General producer
2001	One Piece Mansion	Executive producer
2001	Capcom vs. SNK 2	Executive producer
2001	Mega Man X6	Executive producer
2001	Maximo: Ghosts to Glory	Advisor
2002	Auto Modellista	Executive producer
2002	Breath of Fire: Dragon Quarter	Supervisor
2003	Devil May Cry 2	Executive producer
2003	Chaos Legion	Executive producer
2003	Group S Challenge	Executive producer
2005	Genji: Dawn of the Samurai	Executive director
2006	Monster Kingdom: Jewel Summoner	Producer
2006	Brave Story: New Traveler	Executive director
2006	Genji: Days of the Blade	Executive director
2007	Folklore	Executive director
2008	Dragon Ball: Origins	Executive producer
2010	Dragon Ball: Origins 2	Executive producer
2010	Clash of the Titans	Executive director
2010	Majin and the Forsaken Kingdom	Executive director
2011	Knights Contract	Executive director
2013	Monster Strike	Game designer
