= Dark Mist =

2007 video game

- Developer: Game Republic (Note: Additional work by Japan Studio.)
- Publisher: Sony Computer Entertainment
- Platform: PlayStation 3
- Release: JP: November 8, 2007; PAL: May 15, 2008
- Genre: Shoot 'em up
- Mode: Single player

Dark Mist is a shoot 'em up video game developed by Game Republic and published by Sony Computer Entertainment for the PlayStation 3. It was released as a downloadable game on the PlayStation Store.

== Gameplay ==
Typical gameplay screenshot.

Dark Mist is an action-adventure game. You play as the warrior of light, Artemis, shooting down the forces of darkness. The game is divided into different dungeons, which the hero must hack and slash his way through. The game has an overhead vantage point, making it stylistically similar to the dungeon levels in the first Legend of Zelda game. The hero begins with three "stars" of energy, which are replenished by collecting hearts. In addition to hearts, diamonds, keys and crescent moons are also collected. Sixaxis controls can be utilized to perform a spinning attack that blows back enemies and clears the blinding 'dark mist' from your path.

== Downloadable content ==
An expansion pack for the game titled Depths of Darkness was released for the Hong Kong and Japan PlayStation Store on February 28, 2008. The expansion includes twelve new single player levels, three new playable characters and a new offline and online multiplayer mode and was available for download from the Hong Kong and Japanese PSN store.

== Reception ==
Reception

Aggregate score
| Aggregator | Score |
|---|---|
| Metacritic | 68/100 |

Review scores
| Publication | Score |
|---|---|
| 4Players | 60% |
| Edge | 8/10 |
| Eurogamer | 6/10 |
| GamesMaster | 85% |
| GamesTM | 6/10 |
| Jeuxvideo.com | 12/20 |
| PlayStation Official Magazine – UK | 6/10 |
| Play | 53% |
| PSM3 | 70% |

The game received "average" reviews according to the review aggregation website Metacritic.
