= Shadow Hunters =

2005 board game

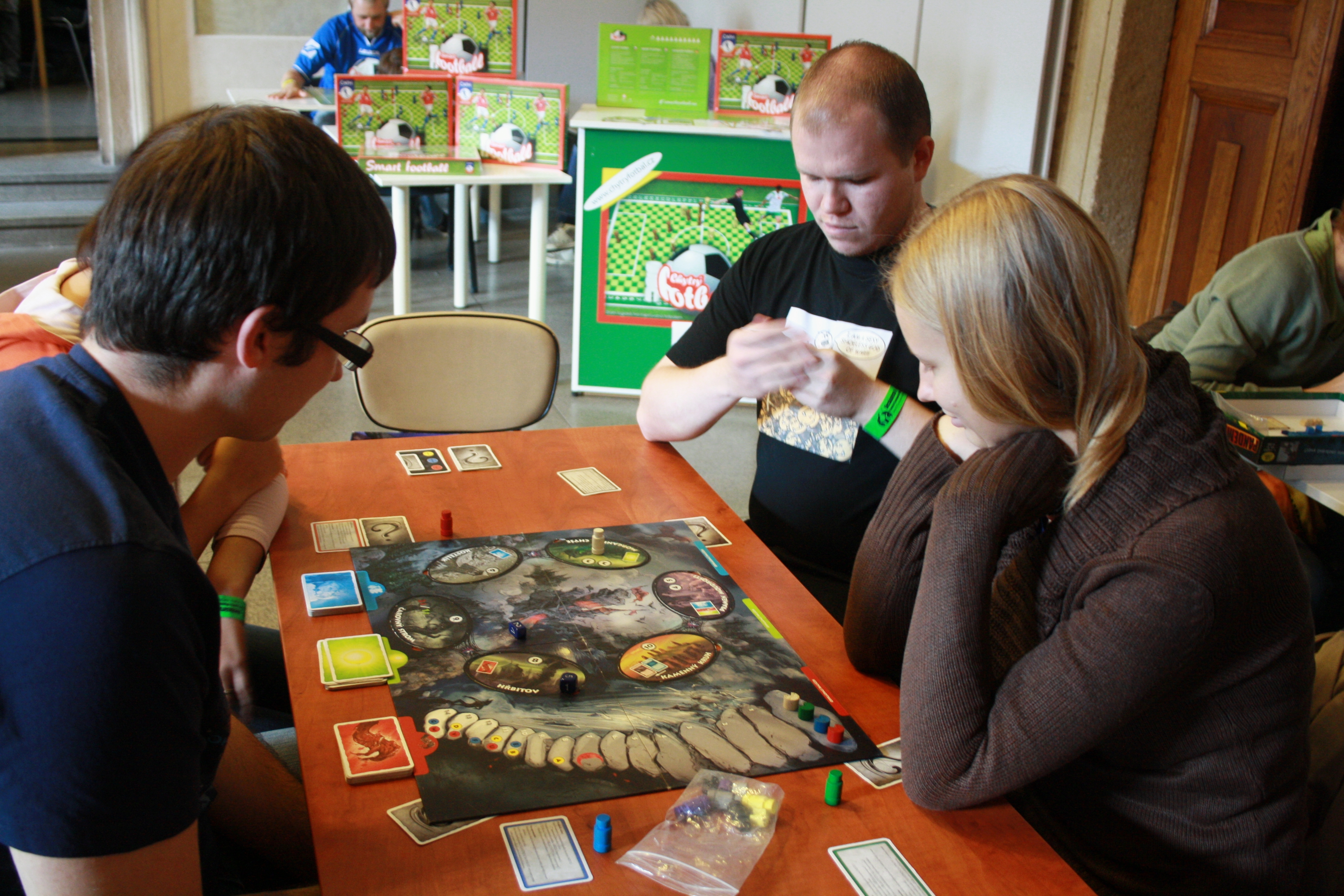
- Designers: Yasutaka Ikeda
- Publishers: Game Republic (Japan); Z-Man Games (U.S.)
- Publication: 2005
- Players: 4-8
- Setup time: 5 minutes
- Playing time: 45-60 minutes
- Chance: High
- Age range: 10+
- Skills: Strategic thought Team play Social skills

Shadow Hunters (シャドウハンターズ, shadō hantāzu) is a social deduction board game designed by Yasutaka Ikeda that was first published in 2005 by Game Republic in Japan. The game was published in the United States by Z-Man Games in 2008. The art style of the game closely resembles the style found in Japanese anime and manga.

Players are secretly assigned the role of a character belonging to one of three factions: Shadows, which are supernatural creatures of the night, Hunters, which are humans attempting to exterminate the Shadows, and Neutrals, which are unaffiliated characters who are caught in the crossfire with individual victory conditions.

Each player does not know the identity or allegiance of any other player, and must use cards, negotiation, and guesswork to figure out who everyone else is. The game ends when one or more players have fulfilled their victory conditions. At this point all players who have fulfilled their objectives are declared winners, whether they are part of the same faction or even alive.

== Setup ==
First, shuffle the six area cards and place them randomly on the designated spots on the game board. Next, shuffle the White, Black, and Hermit decks separately and place them face down on the marked area on the side of the board. Now each player must choose a color and place one piece in the No Damage circle on the board (the HP piece) and one piece in front of them for now (the Player piece). Shuffle the Shadow, Hunter, and Neutral character decks face down separately, and looking at the table below, pick out the appropriate number of cards from each deck, shuffle all of the selected character cards together, then hand out one card to each player, face down. Make sure that other players cannot see your character card when you receive it. Once you have your character card, read over it to see your affiliation, your special ability, and your victory condition. Finally, randomly determine the starting player and begin the game.

Number of Characters
Number of Players	4	5	6	7	8
Shadows	2	2	2	2	3
Hunters	2	2	2	2	3
Neutrals	0	1	2	3	2

== Gameplay ==
Turn order proceeds in a clockwise fashion. Players move their character by rolling the dice and moving their player piece to the area card corresponding to the number they rolled. If a seven is rolled, the player may choose where they want to move, given that it is not the same area that they are currently on. Next, the player may choose whether or not to use the ability stated on the area card. Finally, a player may decide if they want to attack another player within range.

=== Areas ===
Areas are the locations where player characters will land on and interact with. Listed below are the six area cards and what action players may choose to perform when they land on them.

Location	Effect
Hermit's Cabin	The player draws a card from the top of the Hermit Cards stack and confirms what's written on it, then gives it to another player of their choice.
Church	The player draws a card from the top of the White Cards stack and follows the instructions.
Cemetery	The player draws a card from the top of the Black Cards stack and follows the instructions.
Underworld Gate	The player chooses one of three card stacks (White, Black, or Hermit) and draws a card from the top of that stack, then follows the instructions.
Weird Woods	The player chooses a player and does one of the following two actions: A. Deals 2 points of damage to the player B. Removes 1 point of damage from the player. (The player may choose themselves)
Erstwhile Altar	The player obtains an Equipment Card from another player of their choice. Nothing happens if no player has Equipment Cards.

=== Card Types ===
Single-Use Cards: Cards that are placed in their deck's discard pile immediately after play. When a deck runs out of cards, its respective discard pile is shuffled and made into the new deck.

Equipment Cards: Cards that the player keeps in front of them when played. They are always in effect when in front of a player. There is no limit to how many equipment cards a player may have.

==== Hermit Cards ====
The Hermit deck contains only Single-Use cards. Hermit Cards are used to help determine what character and allegiance another player is. When a player draws a Hermit card, they should read what is printed on the card carefully, then hand it face down to the player that they would like to learn more about. The other player will then silently read the card, and if their character matches what is stated on the card, they must suffer the card's effects. If not, the other player must simply say "nothing happens." The player receiving the card may not lie about their character unless they are the Unknown character.

==== White and Black Cards ====
Both the White and Black decks contain Single-Use cards and Equipment cards. White Cards are usually beneficial for either the player drawing them or for others. The White deck contain equipment cards that benefit the user through defensive and supportive means. Black Cards are usually used to inflict damage on other players, but will sometimes inflict damage randomly or even harm the user. The Black deck contains equipment cards that benefit the user through offensive means.

=== Combat ===
At the end of a player's turn, they have the option of attacking another player within range. The default range is the area card that the player is currently on and the adjacent area card that is paired with it. Some Black equipment cards have the ability to modify a player's attack range. When a player makes an attack, they roll both dice and inflict the amount of damage equal to the difference between the numbers (higher number - lower number) rolled to the enemy player. Attacks made against multiple opponents, which is permitted by a specific Black card, are made by rolling the dice and inflicting that amount of damage to all targets.

==== Death ====
As a player takes damage during the game, they move the HP piece onto the number on the board corresponding to how much damage they currently have. HP pieces are used to show the damage levels of all players. A player's character dies when they have accumulated damage equal or more to the HP listed on their character card. When a character dies, the player must flip their character card face up if they have not already and remove their HP piece and Player piece from the board. If a player has killed another player, they are allowed to take one Equipment card from the dead player and discard the rest.

=== Characters ===
Each character possess a special ability that they may use when they reveal their character by flipping their character card face up. The exceptions to this rule are Daniel and Unknown, whose powers are always active. Listed below are all the characters, their affiliations, and their special abilities.

Character	Affiliation	Ability
Allie	Neutral	Mother's Love: You can fully heal your damage once during the game.
Bob	Neutral	Robbery: If you inflict 2 or more points of damage to another character, you can take an Equipment Card of your choice from that character instead of giving him/her the damage.
Charles	Neutral	Bloody Feast: After you attack a character, you can attack the same character again by giving yourself 2 points of damage.
Daniel	Neutral	Scream: You must reveal your identity when another character dies. You cannot reveal your identity at any other time.
Emi	Hunter	Teleport: When you move, you can choose either to roll the dice normally OR move to an adjacent Area Card without rolling the dice.
Franklin	Hunter	Lightning: Once during the game, at the start of your turn, you can choose a character and give him/her damage by rolling a 6-sided die.
George	Hunter	Demolish: Once during the game, at the start of your turn, you can choose a character and give him/her damage by rolling a 4-sided die.
Unknown	Shadow	Deceit: When given a Hermit Card, you may lie about your identity to trigger the card or to say "nothing happens." You do not have to reveal your identity to use this Special Ability.
Vampire	Shadow	Suck Blood: When you attack and give damage to a player, you immediately heal 2 points of your own damage.
Werewolf	Shadow	Counterattack: When you are attacked by a player, you can choose to counterattack him/her immediately after the initial attack is resolved. It is acceptable to reveal your identity right after you are attacked to do the counterattack.

=== Victory ===
A player wins if they fulfill the victory condition stated on their character card at any time during the game. Once a player's victory condition is reached, they may immediately flip their character card face up if they have not already and declare victory, ending the game. All players who have fulfilled their characters' victory conditions by the end of the game are considered to be winners, making it possible for multiple players, even if they are on opposing teams, to win. If a player's character is dead but their victory condition is fulfilled by the end of the game, they are still considered to be a winner.
