= Genji: Dawn of the Samurai =

2005 video game

- The North American cover
- Developer: Game Republic (Note: Additional work by Sony Computer Entertainment Japan)
- Publisher: Sony Computer Entertainment
- Director: Takashi Shono
- Producer: Yoshiki Okamoto
- Artist: Keita Amemiya
- Writer: Toshiya Shibano
- Composer: Yasuharu Takanashi
- Platform: PlayStation 2
- Release: JP: June 30, 2005; NA: September 20, 2005; EU: October 21, 2005; AU: November 3, 2005
- Genres: Action-adventure, hack and slash
- Mode: Single-player

Genji, (Note: Japanese: ゲンジ, Hepburn: Genji) released as Genji: Dawn of the Samurai in North America, is a 2005 hack and slash video game developed by Game Republic and published by Sony Computer Entertainment for the PlayStation 2. It is loosely based on The Tale of the Heike. A sequel, Genji: Days of the Blade, was released for the PlayStation 3.

== Gameplay ==
Gameplay is third-person combat, similar to what is found in the Dynasty Warriors series (produced by Koei) and Shinobi (produced by Sega). The player controls Yoshitsune or Benkei, and both characters are equipped with two basic attacks: Normal and Special. Yoshitsune is an archetypical fast and agile warrior, making up in speed what he lacks in strength. He is able to jump on small platforms (which, if jumped on by Benkei, would collapse). He wields two swords, and can double jump, and can use his sword to hang on ledges. Benkei is the more powerful but slower character, with greater range than Yoshitsune. He uses a large war club, which can also be used to destroy certain structures and heavy doors in the game. Players can improve their characters by collecting experience and leveling up or by using Essences of Amahagane. Yoshitsune and Benkei both have a number of kamui bars under their health bar, proportional to their amount of Amahagane collected. While in battle, the character's kamui bar stores power for the player to release devastating attacks.

== Plot ==
The story follows the adventures of Minamoto Yoshitsune as he descends from his mountain retreat and eventually embraces a quest to defeat the Taira clan, thereby avenging his father. Early in his journey, he meets the Tamayoribito clan, led by Kiichi Hogen and his daughter Minazuru, who are the guardians of the Amahagane (天鋼) – stones of power that allow select individuals to release magical powers known as kamui (神威).

== Reception ==
Reception

Aggregate score
Aggregator	Score
Metacritic	74/100

Review scores
Publication	Score
Edge	8/10
Electronic Gaming Monthly	6.33/10 (Note: Two critics of Electronic Gaming Monthly gave the game each a score of 7/10, and the other gave it 5/10.)
Eurogamer	5/10
Famitsu	32/40
Game Informer	8.5/10
GameRevolution	B−
GameSpot	7.1/10
GameSpy	3/5
GameZone	7.5/10
IGN	7/10
Official U.S. PlayStation Magazine	4/5
X-Play	4/5
Maxim	8/10
The Sydney Morning Herald	3.5/5

The game received "mixed or average reviews" according to video game review aggregator Metacritic. In Japan, Famitsu gave it all four eights, for a total of 32 out of 40. GamePro gave a favorable review to the game, commending its gameplay and graphics, and called it a great adventure game that captivates the players from start to finish. (Note: GamePro gave the game two 4.5/5 scores for graphics and fun factor, 5/5 for sound, and 4/5 for control.)
