= Toy Home =

2007 video game

- PlayStation Store icon
- Developer: Game Republic (Note: Additional work by Japan Studio.)
- Publisher: Sony Computer Entertainment
- Platform: PlayStation 3
- Release: JP: November 1, 2007; WW: December 20, 2007
- Genre: Racing
- Modes: Single-player, multiplayer

Toy Home is a 2007 racing video game developed by Game Republic and published by Sony Computer Entertainment for the PlayStation 3. It was released as a downloadable game on the PlayStation Store.

== Gameplay ==
The goal of the game is to simply collect coins, discover hidden medals, and pass every checkpoint, earning 10 seconds each checkpoint, before times runs out. The player also win points by jumping, smashing and flipping in the room. There are 8 racetracks in the game, all of them are taking place in one of the rooms of the house and are filled with obstacles. There is also a multiplayer mode where up to 8 players can battle online, and leaderboards, where players can see their high scores. The game makes use of Sixaxis for steering and for drifting, though DualShock 3 rumble controllers are also supported

== Reception ==
Reception

Aggregate score
Aggregator	Score
Metacritic	57/100

Review scores
Publication	Score
Eurogamer	7/10
GamesTM	4/10
IGN	6.7/10
Jeuxvideo.com	11/20
PlayStation Official Magazine – UK	7/10
Play	31%

The game received "mixed" reviews according to the review aggregation website Metacritic.
