= Knights Contract =

2011 video game

- North American box art
- Developer: Game Republic
- Publisher: Namco Bandai Games (Note: Released under the Bandai brand.)
- Directors: Yuichi Ueda; Yoshinori Takenaka
- Producer: Ryo Mito
- Writer: Tadashi Satomi
- Composer: Kosuke Yamashita
- Platforms: PlayStation 3 Xbox 360
- Release: NA: February 22, 2011; AU: February 24, 2011; EU: February 25, 2011; JP: July 7, 2011
- Genre: Action
- Mode: Single-player

Knights Contract (Note: Naitsu Kontorakuto (Japanese: ナイツコントラクト)) is a 2011 action video game developed by Game Republic and published by Namco Bandai Games for PlayStation 3 and Xbox 360. The story, set in a fantasy version of Medieval Germany, follows the witch Gretchen and former executioner Heinrich as they seek to stop the schemes of the alchemist Dr Faust, who has revived Gretchen's sisters as vengeful monsters in pursuit of their power. Gameplay has Heinrich exploring linear levels and fighting monsters, with Gretchen as a computer-controlled companion and spellcaster.

Production began in 2008, with Game Republic pitching it to Namco Bandai during a period of financial trouble in the hope of creating a franchise. The team drew inspiration from the legend of Faust and European witch folklore. The staff included writer Tadashi Satomi and composer Kosuke Yamashita. Upon release, the game saw mixed to negative reviews; while praise was given to its premise and art design, its gameplay and Gretchen's artificial intelligence were generally faulted. It was Game Republic's last project before closing in June 2011.

== Gameplay ==
Knights Contract protagonists Heinrich and Gretchen face a monster.

Knights Contract is an action video game in which players take on the role of Heinrich, an executioner cursed with immortality and escorting the witch Gretchen. The campaign is split into missions where Heinrich and Gretchen explore different environments, fighting enemies in arena-style zones between story cutscenes, with each story chapter ending in a boss fight. Heinrich cannot be killed, with the player mashing a button to revive him should he take enough damage. Should Gretchen die, the game ends and must be restarted from a checkpoint. Heinrich can call Gretchen into his arms to restore their health, but this leaves them unable to fight. During one section, the two are split up, with the player not having access to the other's abilities. Within levels, players can find collectables including accessories which enhance character abilities and pieces of artwork.

During the hack and slash-styled combat, players use both Heinrich's melee attacks which can be chained together into combos, and Gretchen's magical abilities which are mapped to controller buttons and act on a cooldown system. Only Heinrich is controlled by the player, with Gretchen guided by the game's artificial intelligence (AI). Souls gathered from defeated enemies can be used to upgrade Gretchen's magic. Fights and chapters have ranking system based on enemies defeated, damage taken, and high combo strings. A special meter is filled during battle, allowing either a short period of high attack output with Heinrich, or a cinematic magical attack from Gretchen. Boss battles are finished with a quick time event (QTE) which must be completed, with the boss regaining a portion of health if failed.

== Plot ==
In a fantasy version of Medieval Germany, seven witches safeguard the world with the Anima Del Monde, a mystical power split into seven crystals. The alchemist Dr Faust, seeking the Anima Del Monde's power, creates a disease dubbed the "Black Death" and has the witches blamed for it. The ensuing witch hunts end in their execution, with the last of their number Gretchen cursing her executioner Heinrich with immortality; Heinrich had earlier expressed doubt as to the morality of his actions, but did not defy Faust's orders, with the immortality curse giving him a chance to atone for his actions. Faust failed to claim Gretchen's piece of the Anima Del Monde.

A century later, the six executed witches−necromancer Straegelle, ice witch Trude, fire witch Holda, storm witch Trendule, the seeress Rapunzel, and their leader Vederinde−are resurrected by Faust as monsters driven by vengeance. Heinrich enters a town being attacked by Straeggelle, whom a reborn Gretchen and her human apprentice Minukelsus are hunting. Gretchen persuades Heinrich to help kill Straegelle, afterwards forming a contract with him to be her sworn Knight. Gretchen seeks to both stop the other witches, and seal the Anima Del Monde on the Brocken on Walpurgis Night before Faust can steal her piece and achieve true immortality. In return for his help, Heinrich is promised the return of his mortality.

On their journey to the Brocken, they defeat Trude, Holda, Trendule and Rapunzel. Rapunzel, later revealed to have retained her own will upon resurrection, took her own life to prevent Gretchen's soul from falling under Faust's spell. They also meet and fight Faust, who has used the Anima del Monde to extend his life and retain his youth. Reaching the Brocken, they are cornered by Vederinde, with Minukelsus sacrificing himself to save Heinrich and Gretchen. Faust faces them on the Brocken, using the Anima Del Monde to attack them. Defeated, he is betrayed and killed by Vederinde, who was feigning obedience to exact revenge on humanity and begin a new cycle of creation. Heinrich and Gretchen defeat Vederinde, and seal away the Anima Del Monde. During their journey Heinrich and Gretchen have grown close, and a final scene set in modern times shows the two still alive and protecting humanity from magical threats.

== Development and release ==
Production of Knights Contract began in 2008. Following the collapse of Brash Entertainment and consequent issues surrounding the video game Clash of the Titans, developer Game Republic was in financial difficulties. Knights Contract was one of a number of projects pitched to Namco Bandai Games as potential franchises. The game was developed for the Xbox 360 (360) and PlayStation 3 (PS3) consoles. According to company founder Yoshiki Okamoto, Namco Bandai underwent restructuring and cut studio budgets following this, which negatively affected Game Republic's in-development titles. Development was completed in January 2011, with Namco Bandai confirming that the game was declared gold (indicating that it was being prepared for duplication and release).

Co-director Yuichi Ueda described the project as having an early period of trial and error about how much the player would control each character. While Gretchen was considered as the playable character, the team opted to focus on the action-oriented Heinrich. The premise drew inspiration from European folklore surrounding witches, and the legend of Faust. The aim was for an original spin on the concept of witches, with a setting blending realistic elements from the time with fantasy additions. The team researched local witch legends and the history of witch hunts in the region. Several of the characters were references to that research, such as the witch Trendule and Minukelsus's late master Paracelsus. The scenario was written by Tadashi Satomi, who had worked on the Persona 2 duology and Shin Megami Tensei: Digital Devil Saga. Kosuke Yamashita, known for his work on the Nobunaga's Ambition series alongside other media projects, composed the soundtrack. The music was recorded using a live orchestra, with the aim being for a grand musical identity.

The game was announced in May 2010 in an issue of Japanese gaming magazine Famitsu. It was later announced for a Western release by Namco Bandai a few days later. A trailer was released the following month to promote it during E3 2010. The reveal trailer was intended to show the game's worldview and premise. The CGI trailers were created by Blur Studio. The game was released through 2011. It was released on February 22 in North America, February 24 in Australia, and February 25 in Europe. In Japan, the game was released on July 7. Knights Contract was Game Republic's last released product before closing down in June 2011.

== Reception ==
Reception

Aggregate score
Aggregator	Score	
Aggregator	PS3	Xbox 360
Metacritic	51/100	49/100

Review scores
Publication	Score	
Publication	PS3	Xbox 360
Edge	N/A	3/10
Famitsu	28/40	28/40
Game Informer	7/10	7/10
GameSpot	6.5/10	6.5/10
GameTrailers	N/A	4.9/10
IGN	3.5/10	3.5/10
Joystiq	1.5/5	N/A
Official Xbox Magazine (US)	N/A	6/10
PALGN	4.5/10	N/A

The PlayStation 3 version received "mixed" reviews, while the Xbox 360 version received "generally unfavorable" reviews according to video game review aggregator Metacritic.

IGN's Levi Buchanan was positive when mentioning the story, feeling invested in the two leads and their narrative. Cody Guinta of PALGN highlighted the premise and story as standing out from other games in its genre, and praised the grim setting. Famitsu similarly praised the unusual setting and characters. Chris Watters of GameSpot felt a lack of chemistry between Heinrich and Gretchen, but was drawn in by the narrative. Game Informer's Andrew Reiner said the story delivered a satisfying payoff, while GameTrailers faulted the cutscenes as consisting of boring dialogue between the two leads. Joystiq's Mike Schiller said the story was "not bad" but let down by its repetitive dialogue. Kevin W. Smith of Official Xbox Magazine felt the narrative fell flat after a strong opening premise, while Edge briefly described the story as "terrible".

Giunta found the music and voice work to be the game's best aspect, while criticizing the lack of polish in its graphics and cutscenes. Reiner, while faulting the overall presentation, praised the character designs, and enjoyed both the music and Laura Bailey's performance as Gretchen. By contrast GameTrailers disliked the voice cast's performances, while praising the environment and enemy design despite technical issues. Buchanan praised the art design and music, but disliked the uneven voice acting and faulted the frequent loading screens and uneven frame rate. Commenting on its presentation, Edge noted unimpressive graphics and art outside the witches' boss designs.

Famitsu praised the combination of melee and magic-based attacks, but two of its four reviewers faulted its poor camera and uneven difficulty. Guinta enjoyed the combat mechanics despite other elements bringing the experience down, while Reiner saw potential in the concept when the game's systems worked correctly. Watters found the combat enjoyable when the various mechanics worked, but disliked the boss fights and the design of later levels. Smith felt there was fun to be had, but a lack of polish and other issues such as the camera created unnecessary difficulties. Edge noted some enjoyable elements in its combat and magic system, but noted these systems were undercut by the game's other flaws. GameTrailers found the gameplay overly repetitive and faulted the punishing nature of QTEs, complaints echoed along with other issues such as the camera by Schiller. Buchanan echoed criticisms of the QTEs and found the gameplay generally frustrating and its level design poor. Gretchen's unreliable and unresponsive AI was repeatedly criticised, due to how easily she could be killed while Heinrich was immobilised.
