= Dragon Ball Kai: Ultimate Butōden =

2011 video game

- Developer: Game Republic
- Publisher: Namco Bandai Games (Note: Released under the Bandai brand name.)
- Series: Dragon Ball
- Platform: Nintendo DS
- Release: JP: February 3, 2011
- Genre: Fighting
- Modes: Single-player, multiplayer

Dragon Ball Kai: Ultimate Butōden (Note: Japanese: ドラゴンボール改 アルティメット武闘伝, Hepburn: Doragon Bōru Kai Arutimetto Butōden, "Dragon Ball Kai: Ultimate Fighting Legend") is a fighting video game for the Nintendo DS based on the Dragon Ball franchise. It was released only in Japan on February 3, 2011.

It is the fifth installment in the Butōden sub-series; the first to be released since 1995's Dragon Ball Z: Shin Butōden; and the first to be based on the Dragon Ball Kai anime series, itself a revised cut of the 1989 Dragon Ball Z anime that the previous installments were based on.

The game would be followed by Dragon Ball Z: Extreme Butōden in 2015.

== Gameplay ==
Ultimate Butōden differentiates itself from other games in the Butōden sub-series in featuring special moves that can be performed via either button input combinations or touching the Nintendo DS's touch screen. Its story mode covers events from the beginning of the Saiyan arc to the end of the Majin Buu arc alongside "What-if" scenarios, despite the latter arc not being yet adapted to the Kai series at the time of its release until was eventually adapted in April 2014 and finished its run in June 2015 with Dragon Ball Z Kai: The Final Chapters.

== Development ==
News of the game first broke when it was announced that distributor Namco Bandai had applied for patents in Japan for two titles, Ultimate Butouden and Zenkai Battle Royale. The full announcement was featured in the following issue of Weekly Shōnen Jump, stating that the game would be released for the Nintendo DS in Japan on February 3 of the following year. Official screenshots suggested that the game would have 3D graphics, and a story mode that would cover events up until the Cell Saga. In the December issue of V Jump featured more screenshots of the gameplay and touch screen menu, showing that players can execute signature attacks by tapping the stylus.

== Reception ==
The game sold 31,108 copies within its first week of release in Japan. In the second week it managed to sell 10,341 copies.
