= Kidō Senshi Gundam SEED Battle Destiny =

- Developer: Artdink
- Publisher: Namco Bandai Games
- Series: Mobile Suit Gundam
- Platform: PlayStation Vita
- Release: JP: June 7, 2012
- Genres: Combat; Mecha; Science Fiction
- Modes: Single-player, multiplayer

Kidō Senshi Gundam SEED Battle Destiny (Japanese: 機動戦士ガンダムSEED BATTLE DESTINY; Kidō Senshi Gandamu SEED Batoru Desutinī) is a game of the Kidou Senshi Gundam series for the PlayStation Vita. The game is a mech sim. The game was developed by Artdink and published by Namco Bandai Games.

A remastered edition, with full English localization, was released in 2025 for the Nintendo Switch and Steam.

== Reception ==
Remastered Edition
Aggregate scores
Source	Rating
Metacritic	67/100 (NS); 68/100 (PC)
Review scores
Source	Rating
Forbes	8/10

The game sold 40,297 copies during the first sales recording period, placing the game at #3 in the Media Create sales chart for all Japanese video games. This was considered a surprising success for a Vita game.

The remastered edition received "mixed or average" reviews on both platforms, according to the review aggregator website Metacritic.

Reviewing the Nintendo Switch version, Ollie Barder of Forbes complimented the updated graphics, control scheme, and points system, giving it an 8/10.
