= Game Republic =

Japanese video game developer

Game Republic Inc.
- Native name: 株式会社ゲームリパブリック
- Romanized name: Kabushiki gaisha Gēmu Ripaburikku
- Type: Kabushiki gaisha
- Industry: Video games
- Founded: 2003; 23 years ago
- Defunct: 2011; 15 years ago
- Headquarters: Meguro, Tokyo, Japan
- Key people: Yoshiki Okamoto, President and CEO; Shinichiro Kajitani, Executive Vice President

Game Republic Inc. (株式会社ゲームリパブリック, Kabushiki-gaisha Gēmu-Ripaburikku) was a Japanese video game developer based in Tokyo. While Game Republic was a completely independent developer able to produce titles for any publisher and/or platform they desire, during the company's early years it had enjoyed a close relationship with Sony Computer Entertainment, with many of their early titles funded by and produced in conjunction with the publisher. Later projects were mostly funded and published by Namco Bandai Games.

== History ==
Game Republic was The company was founded on July 1, 2003 by Yoshiki Okamoto after his departure from Capcom. He began working at rival game developer and publisher Konami in the 1980s, and was responsible for such arcade games as Gyruss and Time Pilot. He then moved to Capcom, where he worked on many renowned video games; he worked on the Resident Evil series and helped produce Street Fighter II.

In June 2011 reports surfaced of Game Republic shutting down its website and vacating its offices. Many of the former Game Republic developers have been hired by Tango Gameworks. The company employed just under 300 individuals before its closure.

== Games ==
Year	Title	Publisher	Platform(s)
2005	Shadow Hunters	Game Republic	Board game
2005	Genji: Dawn of the Samurai	Sony Computer Entertainment	PlayStation 2
2005	Every Party	Microsoft Game Studios	Xbox 360
2006	Brave Story: New Traveler	Sony Computer Entertainment	PlayStation Portable
2006	Genji: Days of the Blade	Sony Computer Entertainment	PlayStation 3
2007	Folklore	Sony Computer Entertainment	PlayStation 3
2007	Dark Mist	Sony Computer Entertainment	PlayStation 3
2007	Toy Home	Sony Computer Entertainment	PlayStation 3
2008	SBI Group Kanshuu: Hajime You! Shisan Unyou DS	Broadmedia	Nintendo DS
2008	Dragon Ball: Origins	Namco Bandai Games	Nintendo DS
2008	Catan	Game Republic	PlayStation 3
2010	Dragon Ball: Origins 2	Namco Bandai Games	Nintendo DS
2010	Clash of the Titans	Namco Bandai Games	PlayStation 3, Xbox 360
2010	Majin and the Forsaken Kingdom	Namco Bandai Games	PlayStation 3, Xbox 360
2011	Dragon Ball Kai: Ultimate Butōden	Namco Bandai Games	Nintendo DS
2011	Knights Contract	Namco Bandai Games	PlayStation 3, Xbox 360
