= Dragon Ball Z: Extreme Butōden =

2015 video game

- Developer: Arc System Works
- Publisher: Bandai Namco Entertainment
- Series: Dragon Ball
- Platform: Nintendo 3DS
- Release: JP: June 11, 2015; EU: October 16, 2015; AU: October 16, 2015; NA: October 20, 2015
- Genre: Fighting
- Modes: Single-player multiplayer

Dragon Ball Z: Extreme Butōden is a 2D fighting game for the Nintendo 3DS that is based on the Dragon Ball franchise. It is the sixth game in the Butōden sub-series following 2011's Dragon Ball Kai: Ultimate Butōden. It was developed by Arc System Works, and returns to using Dragon Ball Z branding.

The game was released on June 11, 2015, in Japan, October 16, 2015, in Europe and Australia and October 20, 2015, in North America.

== Development ==
The game was first revealed at NintendoEverything.com on February 17, 2015. On June 13, 2015, a retailer added a poster hinting a possible localization. The game is the first Butōden game released outside of Japan, France, and Spain.

== Gameplay ==
Extreme Butōden features a combination of elements from both prior games in the Butōden series and developer Arc System Works prior Dragon Ball game, Dragon Ball Z: Supersonic Warriors 2.

The game is a 1-on-1 fighting game featuring battle and support characters to fight against an enemy team in a match. The game includes over 100 characters. Like prior Butōden games, the game features a Health bar and a Ki (energy) bar, labeled Spirit Gauge, which allows Special Attacks to be performed. The fighter who manages to deplete the health bar of the opponent wins the bout and becomes the winner of the match. It differs from prior games in removing the split-screen feature, instead featuring both combatants at each other's view at all times. The game also features combo rush attacks and "Z-Assist" support characters like Dragon Ball Z: Supersonic Warriors 2, which can provide assistance in battle via special moves. Destruction Points (DP) from the beforementioned game also return, which serve to rank character strength and allows limiting how many powerful characters can be used.

== Release ==
Various patches were released during the game's lifecycle, which added various new stages and "Z-Assist" characters from Dragon Ball Super, being the first game to do so other than Beerus and Whis from Dragon Ball Z: Battle of Gods in Dragon Ball Z: Battle of Z.

An additional patch, released in November 2016 in Japan, allows support for local or online multiplayer, crossover cross-play between the game and One Piece: Great Pirate Colosseum, which was also developed by Arc System Works.

== Reception ==
Reception

Aggregate score
Aggregator	Score
Metacritic	61/100

Review scores
Publication	Score
Destructoid	5/10
Famitsu	29/40
GameRevolution	1.5/5
HobbyConsolas	72%
IGN	5.6/10
MeriStation	6/10
Nintendo Life	7/10
Nintendo World Report	6/10
3DJuegos	6/10
Vandal	6/10

Extreme Butōden received mixed or average reviews from critics, it currently has a score of 61/100 on Metacritic. Praise went to the game's visuals, sprite work, and core gameplay; but its story mode, lack of additional gameplay modes, online play, and overall lack of enough innovation received criticism.

Destructoid awarded it a score of 5 out of 10, saying "It's a competent fighter with nice sprite work, but it also does very little interesting with narrative presentation, combat mechanics, or gameplay modes."

The game sold 74,660 copies within its first week of release in Japan. By the end of the year, it had sold 150,989 copies in Japan.
