= Majin and the Forsaken Kingdom =

2010 video game

- European box art
- Developer: Game Republic
- Publisher: Namco Bandai Games
- Directors: Yoshiki Okamoto; Takashi Shono
- Producer: Daisuke Uchiyama
- Designers: Sosuke Honda; Yohei Yanase
- Writers: Ryo Suzukaze; Yohei Yanase
- Composer: Toshihiko Sahashi
- Platforms: PlayStation 3, Xbox 360
- Release: NA: November 23, 2010; AU: November 25, 2010; EU: November 26, 2010; AS: November 26, 2010; JP: January 20, 2011
- Genres: Action-adventure, puzzle
- Mode: Single-player

Majin and the Forsaken Kingdom (魔人と失われた王国, Majin to Ushinawareta Ōkoku) is an action-adventure video game developed by Game Republic and published by Namco Bandai Games. It was released in November 2010 internationally and January 2011 in Japan.

== Plot ==
The story is set in a once prosperous and fruitful kingdom, which is overtaken by a mysterious "Darkness" and thrown into disarray. While many citizens attempted to explore and find out what's going on, they were never to be seen again, and the decay continued. To cleanse this forsaken kingdom of the darkness, a young thief sets out to find and free the mythical Majin - an incredibly powerful mystical beast, to reclaim its power and restore the land to its former glory.

== Gameplay ==
The game is an action-adventure game with puzzle elements thrown in at different intervals. Players control the thief, Tepeu, while the Majin, Teotl, is A.I. controlled. Though the player takes no direct control over Teotl, they can give him commands, which are often used for solving puzzles or during combat.

As the game progresses, Teotl will gain powers, such as the ability to produce electricity. These elements will be used both in combat and puzzle solving.

The game is intended to emphasize the differences in Tepeu and Teotl. For example, at certain points, the characters will be separated and Tepeu must dispatch enemies using stealth, as he does not have the strength Teotl does.

== Development ==
The game was first announced during Namco Bandai's press briefing in Gamescom 2009 trade show. Takahiro Sasanoi, director for Tekken 6, also served as the director for this game. The original title was Majin: The Fallen Realm however, this was later changed during development. Although the game shares many conceptual similarities with Team Ico's The Last Guardian, Namco Bandai states that Majin and the Forsaken Kingdom "was in development long before [The] Last Guardian was announced." In March 2010, Namco Bandai confirmed the game for a western release.

== Reception ==
Reception

Aggregate score
Aggregator	Score	
Aggregator	PS3	Xbox 360
Metacritic	72/100	74/100

Review scores
Publication	Score	
Publication	PS3	Xbox 360
Destructoid	N/A	9.5/10
Edge	7/10	N/A
Eurogamer	7/10	7/10
Game Informer	8/10	8/10
GamePro	N/A	3.5/5
GameRevolution	C	C
GameSpot	7/10	7/10
GameTrailers	N/A	7.1/10
GameZone	N/A	7/10
IGN	7/10	7/10
Joystiq	3/5	N/A
Official Xbox Magazine (US)	N/A	7.5/10
PlayStation: The Official Magazine	7/10	N/A
The A.V. Club	B−	N/A
The Daily Telegraph	N/A	9/10

The game received "mixed or average" reviews on both platforms according to video game review aggregator Metacritic.

The Daily Telegraph gave the X360 version a score of 9 out of 10 and called it "one of the most memorable, enjoyable games I've played this year." However, 411Mania gave the same version 6.9 out of 10 and stated that it's "worth a weekend rental, or possibly a pick-up if you’re in need of an action-adventure game with some backtracking." The A.V. Club gave the PS3 version a B− and said that while the game "isn't overtly a kids' game, the translations and voice acting are almost comically silly."
