= Sébastien Loeb Rally Evo =

2016 video game

- Developer: Milestone srl
- Publisher: Milestone srl
- Platforms: Microsoft Windows; PlayStation 4 Xbox One
- Release: January 29, 2016
- Genre: Racing
- Modes: Single-player, multiplayer

Sébastien Loeb Rally Evo is a racing video game developed by Milestone, who had previously released the official WRC series from 2010 to 2013. It was released on January 29, 2016.

== Features ==
The game features input from nine-time World Rally Champion Sébastien Loeb, who had also won the Pikes Peak International Hill Climb and competed in the 2013 European Rallycross Championship season. The game features around 300 km of tracks, with 8 different rallies, 5 rallycross tracks (including Lohéac, Circuit Trois-Rivières and Autódromo Rosendo Hernández) and the Pikes Peak track, as well as over 50 car models from 17 manufacturers. There is an in-game livery editor.

Besides the main game, the Loeb Experience mode comes with documentary segments where Loeb is interviewed about his early life and eventual career in motorsport, interspersed with rare photos and footage from his childhood and beginnings as a gymnast and later as racer.

== Downloadable content ==
- DLC Rallycross Pack
- DLC Class S The Prototypes: Lancia ECV, Toyota 222D, Vauxhall Astra 4S and Peugeot Quasar.
- Pikes Peak DLC Pack: Peugeot 405 T16, Renault 5 Turbo and Suzuki Escudo.

A playable demo featuring the Rallye Sanremo was released on the PlayStation Store and the Xbox Games Store on December 24, 2015. As of New Years Day, the demo is not available on Steam. A second demo themed around the Rally Mexico was released in 2016.

== Reception ==
Reception

Aggregate scores
Aggregator	Score
GameRankings	71.17%
Metacritic	71/100

Review scores
Publication	Score
Eurogamer	70%
Game Informer	7.5/10
GamesTM	6/10
IGN	78%
PlayStation Official Magazine – UK	7/10
Play	5/10
JeuxActu	75%
GameStar	78%

JeuxActu stated that "Sebastien Loeb Rally Evo is a nice improvement over the previous rally games from Milestone. With an arcady touch, the game's strength is its content and its ease of use, while more experienced players will head over to Codemasters' Dirt Rally." GameStar agreed, saying that it was a "challenging rally simulation with Loeb bonus, but inferior to Dirt Rally in all aspects."

The game reached number 19 in the UK sales charts.
