= Genji: Days of the Blade =

2006 video game

- North American cover art
- Developer: Game Republic (Note: Additional work by Japan Studio.)
- Publisher: Sony Computer Entertainment
- Directors: Yoshiki Okamoto; Yūichi Ueda
- Producers: Kenji Kataoka; Takashi Shono
- Designers: Akiteru Naka; Toshihiko Kurata; Shigeo Takai
- Artists: Keita Amemiya; Kita Koiki; Hisashi Kanie
- Writer: Hideyuki Ishizeki
- Composer: Yasuharu Takanashi
- Platform: PlayStation 3
- Release: JP: November 11, 2006; NA: November 17, 2006; PAL: March 23, 2007
- Genres: Action-adventure, hack and slash
- Mode: Single-player

Genji: Days of the Blade, known in Japan as Genji: The Godly Disturbance, (Note: Japanese: GENJI -神威奏乱-, Hepburn: GENJI -Kamui Sōran-) is a 2006 hack and slash video game developed by Game Republic and published by Sony Computer Entertainment for the PlayStation 3. It is the sequel to Genji: Dawn of the Samurai and the first game to be released under the newly rebranded Japan Studio.

Genji: Days of the Blade takes place three years after the end of Dawn of the Samurai. The Heishi clan, defeated at the end of the previous game, has returned, its military strength bolstered by the use of unholy magic that allows its legions of soldiers to turn into hulking demons. Yoshitsune and his stalwart friend Benkei must do battle with the newly restored Heishi army; this time, however, they gain two powerful allies in their war—the priestess Shizuka, and the spear wielder, Lord Buson. Like the previous Genji game, Days of the Blade is loosely based on the classic work The Tale of the Heike.

The game's presentation at E3 2006 went viral after the producer said that the game was "based on famous battles, which actually took place in ancient Japan" and later battled what he described as a "giant enemy crab".

== Gameplay ==
As with the original Genji, the gameplay bears strong similarities to that of Capcom's Onimusha series. The player controls four characters—Minamoto no Yoshitsune, a samurai and the protagonist of the previous game; Musashibo Benkei, a giant club-wielding monk and Yoshitsune's old friend; Shizuka Gozen, a female priestess; and Lord Buson, a spear-wielding god of war who possesses the body of Kagekiyo, Yoshitsune's most deadliest foe. All four characters have separate lifebars, but should one die, the game ends regardless of the other characters' health at the time.

Unlike the previous game, all characters have access to a real-time weapon change feature that lets them switch between their main weapons quickly, without interrupting the flow of combat. Days of the Blade was one of the first games for the PlayStation 3 that utilize the built-in hard drive.

== Plot ==
Three years after the events of the first game, the game begins with a prologue with an unknown female narrator explaining the events of the previous game. The scene then cuts to a reunion with Yoshitsune and his older brother Yoritomo. Suddenly, the Heishi return, attacking the main castle of the Genji clan. Yoshitsune and Benkei return, along with Shizuka, this time playing a fighting role. After much fighting and confrontation, a mysterious woman of the Heishi, Atsumori, along with an old lady, escape with an important item belonging to the Genji clan. The Heishi also are now powered by a new force, rivaling the Amahagane, known as Mashogane.

In pursuit of the Heishi, the Genji clan attacks the Heishi camp. Yoritomo seems to be accepting their imminent defeat but not before Yoshitsune and his comrades finish off the battle. The three eventually head up a mountain trail continuing their pursuit only to be interrupted by Kagekiyo from the previous game. After a short battle, it is revealed that this entity is not actually Kagekiyo, but the God of War known as Lord Buson, who came to the aid of the Genji clan in defeating the Heishi army, and needed a host body to be able to do anything of use in the human world. Lord Buson chose Kagekiyo's body because he needed the body of a strong warrior as his vessel and Kagekiyo's was apparently most suitable.

Another large scale battle ensues, with the party encountering Mashogane-powered Heishi and giant crabs. Continuing up the trail, the party encounters Atsumori. After the initial fight, she powers up to her stronger form but upon her defeat, her face was disfigured due to a blow from Yoshitsune and company and goes insane, dying shortly afterward. The four are then trapped in an enemy ambush and are sent to the Netherworld, where they encounter "Netherworld" versions of areas from the previous game, including Gojo Bridge, the same area where Yoshitsune and Benkei first battled and met.

Eventually, the party makes it deep into the Netherworld's chambers and locates the spirits of Master Kiichi and of the real Kagekiyo. After a short reunion, Kiichi is struck down by Kagekiyo once more, but Kiichi is not sent away, merely retreating. It is revealed that Kiichi was "left to roam this realm forever" due to Kagekiyo's influence (Kiichi was killed defending Yoshitsune and Benkei during their escape in the previous game). The party then winds up chasing and finally defeating Kagekiyo, thus freeing both Kagekiyo and Master Kiichi's souls.

After escaping the Netherworld, the party finds themselves at another battle which the Genji is losing, suffering heavy casualties since the absence of the four Genji warriors. As the battle rages on, Yoritomo is shown being persuaded by the old lady to use the power of Mashogane to gain power, as she knows he is tired of seeing their forces suffer heavy losses. After this battle is over, the party head to the Heishi forces.

It is here that Noritsune, the Heishi general who has been endlessly trying to seduce Shizuka since the beginning of the Heishi attack, was encountered. After his defeat, Yoritomo along with the rest of the Heishi forces, launch a full-scale attack on the Heishi, approaching their final base with a huge fleet of ships. Upon their arrival, they discover a giant Heishi battleship. The Genji charges directly into the Heishi fleet in order to avoid direct fire.

After much battling and ship jumping, the crew get inside of the battleship. It is here that the party encounters Tomomori, the head honcho of the Heishi thus far. After seemingly being defeated, the rest head onward. Returning to the Heart of the Battleship, Tomomori has possessed the giant Mashogane crystal which powers the ship. After finally defeating him once and for all, the crystal begins to explode, triggering the ship itself to sink, and Benkei jumps on top of Tomomori to finish him off. The floor expectantly falls, with Benkei falling as well.

The scene cuts to Yoshitsune, Shizuka, and Buson on the outer area of the ship, waiting for Benkei's return. Yoritomo appears, along with the old lady, who is revealed to be Kuyo, a Heishi priestess who opposed Yoshitsune and Benkei on Myogyoji Temple (during the events of the first game). Yoritomo is holding Benkei's Amahagane, and it is revealed that Yoritomo has given in to the old lady and the Heishi, in return for his gift of Mashogane. As Yoshitsune lay stunned and speechless on the floor, a few Heishi charge him, with Benkei appearing in a heartbeat, taking the blows for Yoshitsune. Benkei tells the rest to go. Reluctantly, Yoshitsune and Shizuka respect Benkei's wishes and a final shot of Benkei is shown, taking a last stand against the Heishi.

On the escape ship, the twin sisters who arrived with Lord Buson, tell Yoshitsune it is not the time for sadness. They resolve that they must put an end to the war once and for all. The warriors then travel to Hiraizumi castle, where Hidehira requests help once more to quell the Heishi attack on the fortress. After defending the castle, a large Mashogane monster appears and grabs Hidehira, killing him after he refuses to cooperate. In revenge, Yoshitsune and the others slay the beast.

The warriors go to Takadachi, the site of the summoning of the Overworld. Kuyo's plan is to attack the Overworld and become the new ruler of the universe. Following the path, Yoshitsune encounters Yoritomo, under the influence of Mashogane. Yoshitsune tells Lord Buson and Lady Shizuka to step aside, as the two brothers must battle alone. Yoritomo becomes injured, and afterward reveals why he chose the path of Mashogane; as he watched his brother battle, he came to the realization that the Genji needed a strong leader, and eventually, the day would come where Yoshitsune would replace Yoritomo as the leader. Not wanting this, he succumbed to the power of Mashogane. Next, he fully transforms with the Mashogane in order to survive, and Yoshitsune defeats him once more. Accepting his defeat and realizing how foolish he was, Yoritomo gives his brother his swords, to which Yoshitsune reluctantly accepts. As Yoshitsune leaves for the final confrontation with Kuyo, Yoritomo quietly apologizes for his actions and remains alone.

Arriving at the final site, Kuyo opens the portal to the Overworld, and Lord Benkei appears. The warriors were baffled by the sight of Benkei, believing him to have died during previous battle, speak their final words to Kuyo. Benkei tells them that he'll explain his return later. Kuyo is injured and retreats into the Overworld. There, the final battle is waged with Kuyo, defeated twice, attempts to pull Yoshitsune into the Netherworld's portal with her. She fails when Shizuka hits her in the face with her blade, and Benkei reaches out and pulls Yoshitsune to safety.

The warriors and the twin girls have a final reunion. Benkei explains that while it is true that he died, he was only able to remain on Earth due to the power of the gods (Lord Buson and the twin girls). Shizuka asks if she will ever see them again, to which the others reply yes, as they will all meet again in the Overworld eventually. Accepting this, Buson, the girls, and Benkei step into the portal. Benkei, before being fully absorbed into the portal, shouts that he enjoyed his time with Shizuka and Yoshitsune, and peacefully departs.

The unknown female narrator returns and delivers the epilogue. It is revealed that Yoritomo survived the effects of the Mashogane and is now peacefully leading the Genji clan now that the war is truly over. All of the Mashogane were destroyed with the collapse of the Heishi army, and as a result, all Genji soldiers affected by the Mashogane were healed. Shizuka destroyed the Amahagane crystals as well, turning them into small fragments so that they will never be used for war again. The narrator then explains that no one knows where Shizuka left off to afterward. Yoshitsune is then shown, with Shizuka behind him, on horseback, staring into a large grassland, preparing to take off, and start a new life.

== Reception ==
Reception

Aggregate score
Aggregator	Score
Metacritic	55/100

Review scores
Publication	Score
Edge	5/10
Electronic Gaming Monthly	5.17/10
Eurogamer	6/10
Famitsu	29/40
Game Informer	6/10
GamePro	3.25/5
GameRevolution	C−
GameSpot	6.4/10
GameSpy	2/5
GameTrailers	5.9/10
GameZone	6/10
IGN	(US) 6/10 (UK) 5.5/10
Official U.S. PlayStation Magazine	4.5/10

The game received "mixed" reviews according to video game review aggregator Metacritic. In Japan, Famitsu gave it a score of three sevens and one eight, for a total of 29 out of 40. The Famitsu reviewers agreed that the high points of the game were its graphics and controls, but they were critical to the in-game camera. The game received the IGN Award for Best Artistic Design on PlayStation 3 in 2006.

== Meme ==
The "Giant Enemy Crab" meme originated during the demonstration of Genji: Days of the Blade at the Sony E3 2006 press conference. The producer Bill Ritch claimed that Genji 2's epic battles were based on "famous battles which actually took place in ancient Japan". Approximately two minutes after this was spoken, the gameplay footage showed a boss battle against, in his own words, a "giant enemy crab". Popular memes originating from the Genji demonstration included the game features described such as "you attack its weak point for massive damage" and "real-time... weapon change", despite neither of these being at all new to video gaming. In IGN's E3 2006 wrap-up, they listed a number of Genji 2 quotes.
