= Every Party =

2005 video game

- Developers: Microsoft Game Studios Japan; Game Republic
- Publisher: Microsoft Game Studios
- Artist: Momoko Sakura
- Platform: Xbox 360
- Release: JP: December 10, 2005
- Genre: Party
- Modes: Single-player, multiplayer

Every Party (エブリパーティ, Ebiri Paati) is a party video game developed by Microsoft Game Studios Japan and Game Republic and published by Microsoft Game Studios as a Japanese launch title for the Xbox 360.

== Gameplay ==
The game plays as a board game in which up to four players compete to be the first to reach a goal. Each board features multiple routes, with some being shorter and riskier, while others are longer but potentially more lucrative in terms of prizes. There are a number (30+) of different mini games which can be triggered during play, similar to the Mario Party series.

Before play begins, players select a character and customize the character with a variety of items and accessories unlocked during previous sessions. When playing online via Xbox Live, this helps provide a unique appearance as compared to other players.

=== Roulette wheels ===
Spinning a roulette wheel.

Movement is handled by spinning roulette wheels, although players actually collect the wheels themselves during the course of the game and pick which wheel to use each turn. There are 37 different wheels, with different distributions of numbers, allowing some strategy in trying to get the desired number to come up. Players can store up to five different roulette wheels at once.

Some roulette wheels contain star spaces. If the wheel lands on one of these locations, the player is subjected to the bonus or penalty from the current square again. While this can be helpful if on a particularly beneficial square, such spaces usually have little or no movement accompanying them, and so ultimately hinder progression towards the goal.

=== Medals ===
In addition to collecting roulette wheels, players also collect medals (frequently referred to as "coins", due to their resemblance to gold coins). These medals are used as payment to pass certain obstacles, to avoid certain negative effects, or to make purchases (often of coveted roulette wheels).

== Development ==
The characters in the game were designed by Japanese writer and manga artist Momoko Sakura, known for her work on Chibi Maruko-chan.

== Reception ==
As the title was released only in Japan, most English language review sites previewed the game but neglected to perform a full review. Positives which were highlighted included customizable online play and a unique artistic style. Negative comments focused on long load times, dated graphics, and overly-simplistic mini games.

Japanese review scores:

- Weekly Famitsū: 30 out of 40 (75%)
- Famitsū Xbox 360: 24 out of 40 (60%)
