= Yoostar =

- Developer: Blitz Games Studios
- Publisher: Yoostar Entertainment Group
- Platforms: PlayStation 3, Xbox 360, PC, Mac
- Genre: Casual

Yoostar is a video-based gaming system developed by Yoostar Entertainment Group that allows users to insert themselves into movie or television scenes to perform with the films' original actors and post the resultant video on the Yoostar web site, as well as in third-party social networking environments like Facebook, YouTube or MySpace. The game is a video karaoke, judging individuals performances.

YooStar Entertainment's first product – YooStar 1, for PC and Mac – was initially released in an exclusive marketing partnership with the Bloomingdale's department store chain on August 26, 2009.

== Gameplay ==
To populate the Yoostar clip library, in-house artists digitally erase actors or other key figures in a licensed film or television clip. The company has patented this technique. Users film themselves saying either the original lines from the clip using the software's teleprompter, or ad-libbing their own versions. A chalk outline is overlaid on the scene to help position the user in scale with the other actors. Users are allowed as many takes as needed to get a satisfactory result. The software then composites the user's filmed content with the original clip in the same fashion Hollywood actors are filmed against green screens on set and inserted into digitally created backgrounds. The final product is then labeled and stored on the user's local machine, with the option to upload it to Yoostar's website. The site provides the ability to embed content in any Flash-supporting HTML environment using raw code, or in blogging platforms and social networking sites such as Facebook. Yoostar site users can rate, comment, and share content with the public or a group of "Friends," depending on each clip's settings.

== Yoostar 2 ==
On Tuesday June 15, 2010, to coincide with the beginning of E3, Yoostar announced a second version of the game and launched a new website called Yoostar 2. Yoostar 2 is playable via the Xbox 360 (Kinect required) and PlayStation 3 (PlayStation Eye required, PlayStation Move optional) video game consoles. Yoostar 2 includes 80 film scenes from major Hollywood studios.

Yoostar 2 for the Xbox 360 Kinect and PlayStation Move released in North America on March 8, 2011. In the fall of 2011, Yoostar cooperated with MTV to allow users to star in scenes from MTV's TV shows and music videos. Yoostar on MTV for Xbox 360 Kinect released in North America on November 15, 2011.

Yoostar 2 received average reviews from critics, with an aggregate scores of 50 and 54 out of 100 on Metacritic.
