= Dragon Ball: Origins =

2008 video game

- American cover art featuring some of the crew.
- Developer: Game Republic
- Publishers: JP/EU: Namco Bandai Games (Note: Released under the Bandai brand name.); NA/AU: Atari
- Director: Kensuke Nakahara
- Designer: Ryotaro Takahashi
- Programmer: Junichi Tani
- Writers: Yousuke Kawakami; Naoki Matsumoto
- Composers: Cozy Kubo; Minato Seki
- Series: Dragon Ball
- Platform: Nintendo DS
- Release: JP: September 18, 2008; NA: November 4, 2008; AU: December 4, 2008; EU: December 5, 2008
- Genre: Action-adventure
- Mode: Single-player

Dragon Ball: Origins (Note: Japanese: ドラゴンボールDS, Hepburn: Doragon Bōru Dī Esu; Dragon Ball DS) known as Dragon Ball DS in Japan, is a video game for the Nintendo DS based on the Dragon Ball franchise created by Akira Toriyama. The game was developed by Game Republic and published by Atari and Namco Bandai under the Bandai label. It was released on September 18, 2008, in Japan, November 4, 2008, in North America, December 5, 2008, in Europe, and December 11, 2008, in Korea. The game was released in Australia on December 4, 2008, but was later recalled as its PG rating did not reflect the "racy" content found in the game and was subsequently given a higher rating.

The game uses the stylus and touchscreen to take control of series' main protagonist Goku. The game follows events from the original manga and anime series, which sees Goku's journey with Bulma to find the seven mythical Dragon Balls, and later, his training under the martial arts teacher Master Roshi to compete in the 21st Tenkaichi Budokai.

A sequel, Dragon Ball: Origins 2, was released in 2010.

== Gameplay ==
Goku using his Kamehameha Wave technique on a wild pig.

The game, for the most part, is presented in a 3/4 overhead perspective with elements similar to The Legend of Zelda: Phantom Hourglass. Players take full advantage of the stylus and touchscreen capabilities by journeying through each level battling enemies, solving puzzles and collecting power-ups, health items, and various Zeni Bags. Although Goku's movements are controlled by the stylus, they're not limited to it as players can still use the directional button. Over the course of the game players will learn new techniques to battle enemies with. Players can use their Skill Points to upgrade their levels to improve combat performance.

Another feature is addition of Bulma, who will tag alongside the player in many of the levels throughout the game. Although she is armed with whatever weapon the player has given her, she is still vulnerable to any attack. Often the player will run into obstacles like a gaps or doors that will restrict Bulma's progress, which the player must remedy to proceed.

The game's primary mode is the "Episode Select", where players are given the option of playing each episode installment in chronological order or play them at random. Players can revisit these installments to either try to earn a higher rank or search for items they missed. As each installment is completed, a new installment is unlocked.

Some levels contain racing elements where players, on Nimbus, must arrive at a particular point or catch up with an opponent with a time limit or before the opponent moves out of range.

As a bonus, players are given the opportunity to collect figures throughout the game. These figures are eventually the avatars of all characters within the game. They can be either found in random places in each episode installment or purchased in the store. Each figure comes with its own animation that can be viewed in the "Animation Figure screen". Players can also trade figures with other players via wireless multi-card play.

== Development ==
The game was first announced in the May 2008 issue of V Jump magazine, which listed a release date sometime later that year. It revealed that the game would be a platformer, and it would focus on, at least, the Pilaf story arc. Some of the screenshots demonstrated the stylus' capabilities in combat and the convenience of the dual screen gap such as censoring Bulma's genitals when she flashes Master Roshi for a Dragon Ball. It also showed that Bulma would be involved in the gameplay in some form. The June issue of V Jump added more screenshots demonstrating the stylus' use in performing various melee combat techniques with hand-to-hand or with the use of the Power pole. The issue also confirmed the official Japanese release for September 18. The July issue of V Jump featured screenshots of the game's various menus, maps, and the Dragon Radar. The August issue of V Jump featured screenshot and promotional art that revealed that the game's story mode would include the tournament story arc and the characters Krillin and Launch.

A few weeks later, Atari's US and European branches would issue press statements announcing that they would release the game in both territories under the new name Dragon Ball: Origins, and that a European release date would be sometime in December. In early September, a playable demo was made available on the Everybody's Nintendo Channel for the Wii in Japan, which remained available until September 17 where it was only available via DS Station kiosks. In October, the game was unveiled to the public at the Tokyo Game Show with booths setup for hands-on demonstration. A few days later, Atari issued a statement announcing that their work on Origins was complete and would be released throughout North America on November 4.

== Reception ==
Reception

Aggregate score
Aggregator	Score
Metacritic	78/100

Review scores
Publication	Score
Famitsu	30/40
GamePro	4.5/5
GameRevolution	B
GameSpot	8/10
GamesRadar+	4/5
GameZone	8/10
IGN	8.2/10
Nintendo Power	7/10
Official Nintendo Magazine	70%
3DJuegos	8.7/10
Vandal	8.8/10

Dragon Ball: Origins received "generally favorable" reviews, according to video game review aggregator Metacritic. Anime News Network called the game "Impressive for a DS game." Game Revolution also praised the game for "DS graphics not badly done." The Japanese magazine Famitsu gave the game a "Silver Hall of Fame" score. Similarly, Nintendo Power also gave the game 7 out of 10. IGN gave the game an 8.2, citing, "The gameplay is well done, if not a little repetitive overall."
