= Dragon Ball: Origins 2 =

2010 video game

- European cover art featuring mainly Goku and some other characters.
- Developer: Game Republic
- Publisher: Namco Bandai Games (Note: Released under the Bandai brand name outside North America.)
- Series: Dragon Ball
- Platform: Nintendo DS
- Release: JP: February 11, 2010; NA: June 22, 2010; EU: July 2, 2010
- Genre: Action-adventure
- Mode: Single-player

Dragon Ball: Origins 2, known as Dragon Ball DS 2: Charge! Red Ribbon Army (ドラゴンボールDS2 突撃! レッドリボン軍, Doragon Bōru Dī Esu Tsū Totsugeki! Reddo Ribon Gun; "Dragon Ball DS 2: Assault! Red Ribbon Army") in Japan, is a video game for the Nintendo DS based on the Dragon Ball franchise and the sequel to 2008's Dragon Ball: Origins. The game was developed by Game Republic and published by Namco Bandai throughout North America and everywhere else under the Bandai label. Released in 2010.

The game allows players, through stylus and touchscreen interactivity, to take on the role of series' main protagonist Son Goku, who must journey to find the seven mythical Dragon Balls and stop the evil organization Red Ribbon Army from achieving their Dragon Ball's wish of world domination. The original Japanese release comes with an emulated version of the 1986 Famicom video game Shenlong no Nazo included as a bonus feature.

== Development ==
The game was first announced in the December issue of V Jump magazine. The announcement revealed the game would retain most of the mechanics from Origins, it would mostly follow the Red Ribbon Army story arc, and a Japanese release date for February 11 of the following year. Later that month, it was announced that the game would include the emulated rom of the original Famicom game Shenron no Nazo (神龍の謎, Riddle of Shenlong). This raised the question that if and when the game was released in English-speaking markets, would the rom be included with an English translated script or be left out entirely, as that game had been originally released throughout North America under the title Dragon Power in 1986, and all evidence of the Dragon Ball license was removed. On February 18 the North American branch announced they would be distributing the game with the Origins' moniker as used by Atari and would release the game sometime in the following summer. It was also revealed that the game would give the players the ability to play as not only Son Goku, but also Bulma, Kuririn, and Yamcha. Each character would have their own abilities and powerups. There would also include a two-player co-op mode. In early May, it was announced that Origins 2 would be one of six games featured at E3 2010 for a hands-on demonstration. On May 24, Namco Bandai North American branch released a statement announcing that the game was completed and would be released throughout North America on May 31. It was also stated that a playable demo would be available on the same day.

== Reception ==
Reception

Aggregate scores
Aggregator	Score
GameRankings	68.50%
Metacritic	70/100

Review scores
Publication	Score
GameRevolution	B−
GameSpot	5.5/10
GameZone	8/10
IGN	7.5/10
Nintendo Power	8/10
Nintendo World Report	6/10
Official Nintendo Magazine	68%
3DJuegos	8.2/10
Vandal	7.8/10

The game was met with average to mixed reception upon release, as GameRankings gave it a score of 68.50%, while Metacritic gave it 70 out of 100.
