= Clash of the Titans (video game) =

2010 video game

- Developer: Game Republic (Note: Additional development by Hexadrive; BlackBerry version developed by Glu Mobile.)
- Publishers: Namco Bandai Games; Warner Bros. Interactive Entertainment (Note: Released under the Bandai label; BlackBerry version by Glu Mobile.)
- Director: Norikazu Miwa
- Designers: Shūji Komatsu; Tadahisa Uchino
- Programmer: Shunsuke Kitano
- Composers: Masaya Imoto; Minako Seki; Masamichi Seki
- Platforms: BlackBerry, PlayStation 3, Xbox 360
- Release: BlackBerry: NA: 26 February 2010; PlayStation 3 & Xbox 360: EU: 28 May 2010; AU: 3 June 2010; JP: 17 June 2010; NA: 27 July 2010
- Genre: Action-adventure
- Mode: Single-player

Clash of the Titans (also known as Clash of the Titans: The Video Game) is a 2010 video game developed by Game Republic and published by Namco Bandai Games and Warner Bros. Interactive Entertainment for the PlayStation 3 and Xbox 360. It is based on the 2010 film. An abridged version for the BlackBerry developed by Glu Mobile was released three months earlier.

== Gameplay ==
The game features hack and slash combat. Some of the fights end with quick time sequences. The player can use points to upgrade their weapons. In some sections of the game the player has their weapons removed and has to fight by hand. The player can perform both light and heavy attacks and can hold buttons to release special attacks. The player can wield swords, bones, bows, and scorpion tails. The enemies have health bars with colours to show how much health they have left.

== Plot ==
The game's plot closely follows that of the movie.

== Development ==
The game was developed by Game Republic and published by Namco Bandai Games. The game was originally going to be published by Brash Entertainment, before it was picked up by Namco Bandai.

== Reception ==
Reception

Aggregate score
| Aggregator | Score | |
| Aggregator | PS3 | Xbox 360 |
|---|---|---|
| Metacritic | 41/100 | 42/100 |

Review scores
| Publication | Score | |
| Publication | PS3 | Xbox 360 |
|---|---|---|
| Edge | N/A | 3/10 |
| Eurogamer | 3/10 | 3/10 |
| Game Informer | 4/10 | 4/10 |
| GamePro | N/A | 2/5 |
| GameRevolution | D− | D− |
| GameSpot | 4.5/10 | 4.5/10 |
| GameTrailers | N/A | 4.1/10 |
| GameZone | 4/10 | N/A |
| IGN | N/A | 3/10 |
| Joystiq | N/A | 1.5/5 |
| Official Xbox Magazine (US) | N/A | 6/10 |
| PlayStation: The Official Magazine | 1/5 | N/A |
| The Escapist | N/A | 2/5 |
| The Guardian | N/A | 2/5 |

The game received "unfavorable" reviews according to video game review aggregator Metacritic. The graphics, gameplay, story, menu systems, and level design were criticized. Nicky Woolf of The Guardian likened the level design of the Xbox version to "a four-year-old with only three different crayon colours" and labeled the quick-time event combat style therein as "annoying". Ben Reeves of Game Informer called the PS3 version a "frustrating action game with little depth". Dan Whitehead of Eurogamer described the combat as "relentless" but the game as a whole "barely succeeds on its own terms." IGN's Anthony Gallegos called the graphics "ugly as sin".
