= Mike Bloom (musician) =

American musician (born 1975)

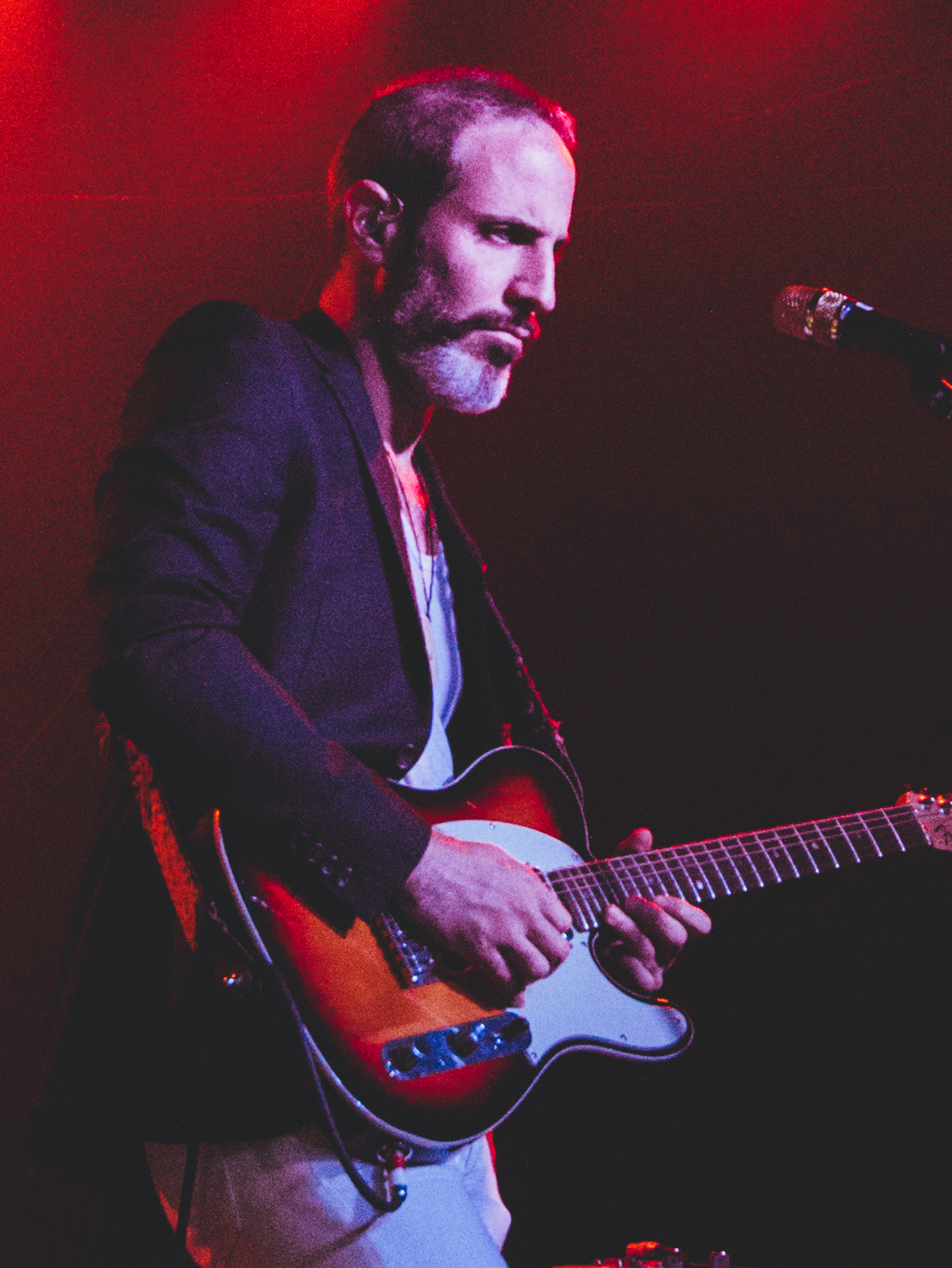
- Bloom performing with Jenny Lewis at the Ready Room in 2015
- Born: Michael Evan Bloom; April 5, 1975 (age 51); Manhasset, New York, U.S.
- Occupations: Musician; singer; composer; producer; mixer
- Years active: 2004–present
- Relatives: Brian Bloom (brother); Scott Bloom (brother)
- Musical career
- Formerly of: Rilo Kiley; The Elected

Michael Evan Bloom (born April 5, 1975) is an American musician, singer, composer, producer and mixer who has performed, produced or recorded with artists such as Rilo Kiley, Jenny Lewis, Julian Casablancas, Johnathan Rice, Margot & the Nuclear So and So's, and Rachael Yamagata. He was a co-founder of The Elected. Bloom plays guitar, bass, lap steel guitar, keys, drums, banjo, and harmonica. He is also a composer and has served as music supervisor for films and TV shows. He is the younger brother of actor/writer Brian Bloom and actor/producer/writer Scott Bloom.

== Biography ==
Mike was a de facto member of Rilo Kiley from 2004–2005, touring with the band to support their 2004 record, More Adventurous. During this time, he also appeared on several late night TV show performances with the band.

Blake Sennett of Rilo Kiley approached Bloom with home demos which would eventually become 2004's The Elected record, Me First. While in Sennet's home studio one day Blake handed Bloom a lap steel, which was a gift from Jenny Lewis. While Bloom says he had never played one before, he "instantly took to it and what we recorded that day ended up on the first Elected record." Released by Sub Pop, the songs were recorded at Elliott Smith’s studio with Bright Eyes' Mike Mogis and The Postal Service’s Jimmy Tamborello. Bloom co-produced, mixed, and played various instruments on all three Elected records, much of which was done during off days on the road with Rilo Kiley, with Mike and Blake’s mobile recording rig. Other contributions or touring members of The Elected included Jason Boesel (of Rilo Kiley), Orenda Fink (of Azure Ray), Daniel Brummel, and Michael Runion.

Bloom joined Julian Casablancas in 2009 as a touring guitar player in support of Casablancas' solo record, Phrazes for the Young. He also performed on the Casablancas single "I Like the Night", an original song, written for Azzaro's men's fragrance, Decibel, dB.

Bloom's debut solo album, King of Circles, was released in June 2011 on Rilo Kiley's bassist Pierre de Reeder's label, Little Record Company. The New York Daily News drew comparisons to Harry Nilsson and The Byrds' "70s brand of singer-songwriting folk rock patented on the West Coast" with "scenic guitar work and sumptuous melodies" and "expertly displayed and deceivingly complex acoustic picking." Bloom wrote and played all of the instruments on the record, which also features Jenny Lewis, who co-wrote "Butchers Paper", and string arrangements from Bright Eyes' Nate Walcott.

Bloom played guitar, lap steel and vocals, in addition to serving as musical director for Jenny Lewis in support of 2014's The Voyager.

The Elected reunited for a one-off show opening for Morrissey at Red Rocks Amphitheatre in 2015 and then again in 2018 opening for Azure Ray in Los Angeles at their reunion show held at the Lodge Room.

== Discography ==
=== Solo ===
- Mike Bloom - King of Circles (2011, Little Record Company)

=== Singles ===
- Modern Love (2025, Disquiet Records)
- Dead Man (The Tippler)/Gaslight (2025, Disquiet)
- Damnedest Times (2025, Disquiet)
- Pop Life (2025, Disquiet)
- Natural Disaster (2025, Disquiet)

=== The Elected ===
- The Elected - Me First (2004, Sub Pop)
- The Elected - Sun, Sun, Sun (2006, Sub Pop)
- The Elected - Bury Me In My Rings (2011, Vagrant Records)

=== Album appearances (including production & mixing credits) ===
- Rilo Kiley - Live at Fingerprints EP (2004, Brute/Beaute Records)
- Rilo Kiley - More Adventurous (2004, Brute/Beaute Records)
- Jenny Lewis and the Watson Twins - Rabbit Fur Coat (2006, Team Love Records)
- Rilo Kiley - Under the Blacklight (2007, Warner Bros. Records)
- Johnathan Rice - Further North (2007)
- Rachael Yamagata - Elephants...Teeth Sinking Into Heart (2008, Warner Bros. Records)
- Rig 1 - Above The Tree Line West Of The Periodic (2008, Team Love Records)
- Afroskull – To Obscurity And Beyond (2009)
- Jason Boesel - Hustler's Son (2010, Team Love Records)
- Jarrod Gorbel - Devil's Made a New Friend (2010)
- Lindsey Ray - Goodbye From California (2010)
- Heidecker and Wood - Some Things Never Stay The Same (2013)
- The Voidz - Tyranny (2014, Cult Records)
- Night Terrors of 1927 - Everything's Coming Up Roses (2015, Atlantic Records)
- Elle Belle - Wako Gumbo (2016)
- Richard Edwards - Lemon Cotton Candy Sunset (2017, Joyful Noise Recordings)
- Richard Edwards - Verdugo (2018, Joyful Noise Recordings)
- Elle Belle - No Signal (2018)

=== Compilation appearances ===
- Flower Moon Records - Friends and Family Volume 1 (2018, Flower Moon Records)

== Film and television ==
=== Compositions ===
- Whatever We Do (2003) - composer
- Song One (2014)
- Concussion (2015) - original song
- Midnight Sun (2018) - score/mixing/performing with Nate Walcott
- Coca-Cola - We Are The Coca-Cola Company (2017) - original song

=== Performances ===
- The Late Late Show with Craig Ferguson - Rilo Kiley - "Portions for Foxes"
- Late Night with Conan O'Brien - Rilo Kiley - "Portions for Foxes"
- The Tonight Show Starring Jimmy Fallon - Julian Casablancas - "River of Brakelights" (2010)
- Late Night with David Letterman - Harper Simon - "Wishes and Stars" (2010)
- The Tonight Show Starring Jimmy Fallon - Jenny Lewis - "Just One of the Guys"
- CBS This Morning - Jenny Lewis (2014)
- Late Night With Seth Meyers - Jenny Lewis (2014)
- Austin City Limits - Jenny Lewis (2015)
- The Late Late Show - Jenny Lewis (2015)
- Jimmy Kimmel Live! - Jenny Lewis (2015)
