= Ryland Steen =

American drummer (born 1980)

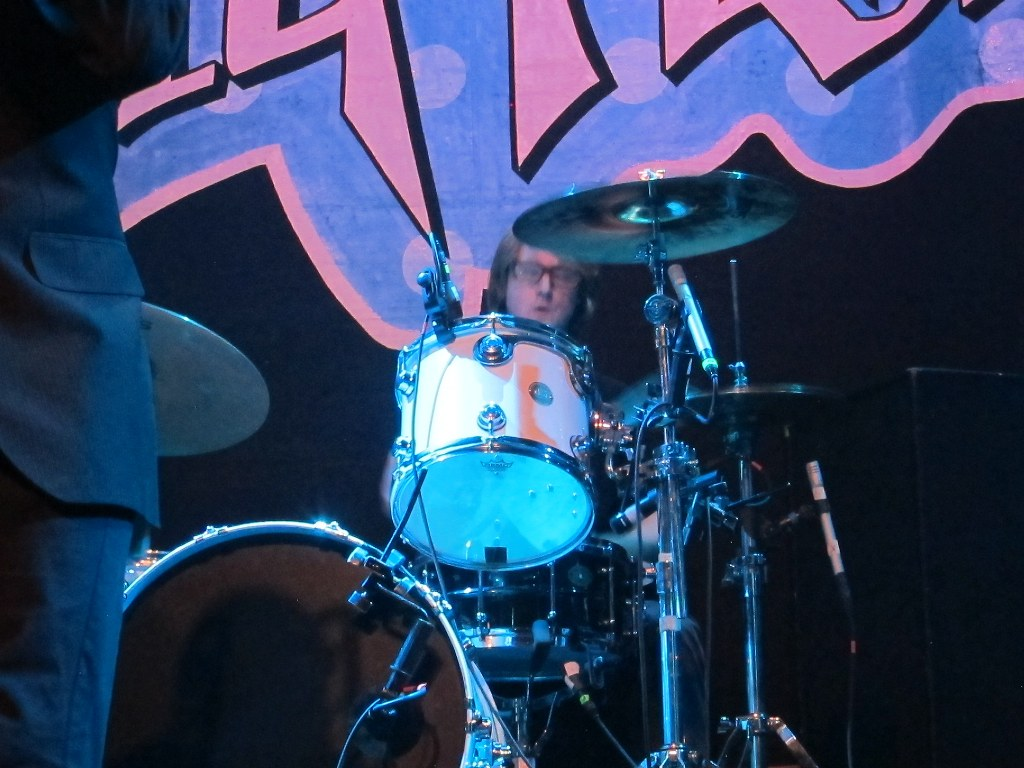
- Steen with Reel Big Fish in 2014.

Background information
- Born: August 31, 1980 (age 44); Lincoln, Nebraska
- Genres: Pop rock; ska punk; soft rock
- Occupation: Drummer
- Years active: 2000–present
- Member of: America
- Formerly of: Square; Reel Big Fish; Audiovent; Agent Sparks; The Elected; The Summer Obsession; Start Trouble; Phantom Planet; Suburban Legends; Mt. Egypt; TEA

Ryland Steen (born August 31, 1980) is an American drummer who was drummer for ska punk band Reel Big Fish from 2005 to 2014 and is the current drummer for soft rock band America since 2014. He has also performed with Maroon 5, Kris Allen, and Phantom Planet.

== Biography ==
Steen was born in Lincoln Nebraska on August 31, 1980. His father is Dave Steen, a former member of the 1980s power pop band Hawks and brother to drummer Drew Steen.

Steen began playing piano at the age of 6 and drums at 13. He moved to Orange County, California at age 19 in 2000, with pop/fusion group Square, which also featured vocalist/keyboardist Sean Beste and future Maroon 5 guitarist, James Valentine. Square entered and won an Ernie Ball-sponsored band competition, where Steen met the ska punk band Reel Big Fish.

While in Orange County, Steen worked with various artists, including Audiovent, between 2003 and 2004, and their subsequent spin off band Agent Sparks. He also played with The Elected, The Summer Obsession, Start Trouble, Phantom Planet, Suburban Legends, Mt. Egypt, and TEA. He also briefly performed with Maroon 5 in 2004 as a touring substitute for Ryan Dusick.

In 2005, Steen joined Reel Big Fish, leaving Agent Sparks to do so. He played on three studio albums with Reel Big Fish. He started touring with the band America in 2014, going on hiatus from Reel Big Fish to do so. Steen has stayed with America to the present day with his position in Reel Big Fish being filled by Edward Beach of Suburban Legends.

== Discography ==
| Year | Artist | Title | Notes |
|---|---|---|---|
| 2000 | Square | This Magnificent Nonsense | |
| 2001 | Suburban Legends | Suburban Legends | additional musician |
| 2004 | Start Trouble | Every Solution Has Its Problem | |
| 2005 | Mt. Egypt | Perspectives | percussion in two tracks |
| 2006 | Reel Big Fish | Our Live Album Is Better Than Your Live Album | |
| 2006 | The Elected | Sun, Sun, Sun | |
| 2006 | Jeff Larson | Swimming In The Make Believe | drums on one track |
| 2007 | Reel Big Fish | Monkeys for Nothin' and the Chimps for Free | |
| 2008 | Look Daggers | Suffer In Style | drums and keyboards |
| 2009 | Reel Big Fish | Fame, Fortune And Fornication | drums and backing vocals |
| 2009 | Half Past Two | It's About Time | Music Consultant |
| 2009 | Jeff Larson | Heart Of The Valley | drums on one track |
| 2010 | Free Moral Agents | North Is Red | vdrums |
| 2010 | Reel Big Fish | A Best Of Us... For The Rest Of Us | drums, cymbal, shaker, congas, tambourine, guera, backing vocals |
| 2011 | Low | C'mon | percussion |
| 2012 | Kris Allen | Thank You Camellia | drums on one track |
| 2012 | Reel Big Fish | Candy Coated Fury | drums, percussion, vocals |
| 2013 | Suburban Legends | Dreams Aren't Real, But These Songs Are | drums on three tracks |
| 2016 | Reel Big Fish | Happy Skalidays | drums, percussion |
| 2016 | Gerry Beckley | Carousel | drums |
| 2017 | Jeffrey Foskett | You Remind Me Of The Sun | drums, percussion on two tracks |
| 2018 | Reel Big Fish | Life Sucks... Let's Dance! | additional percussion, additional engineering, additional Digital Editing |
| 2019 | Gerry Beckley | Horizontal Fall | drums |
| 2019 | America | Lost & Found | drums on one tracks |
| 2019 | Gerry Beckley | Five Mile Road | additional engineering |
| 2019 | Jeffrey Foskett | Love Songs | drums |
| 2019 | America | Live At The London Palladium | drums, percussion, backing vocals |
| 2021 | Half Past Two | Half Past Two | percussion |
| 2021 | Sjöbeck | Sjöbeck | drums, arranging and production |
| 2022 | Gerry Beckley | Aurora | drums on two tracks |
