= Brian Bloom =

American actor (born 1970)

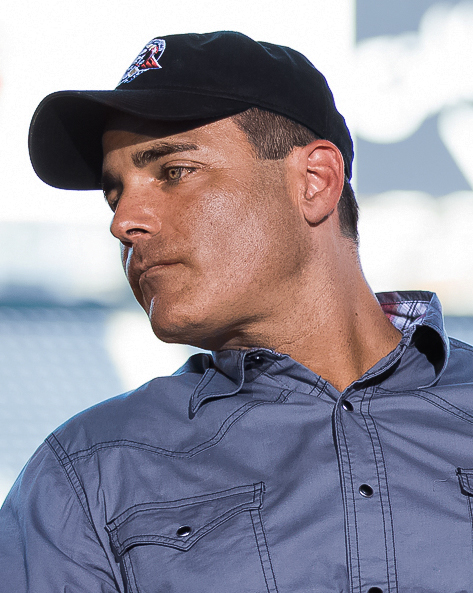
- Bloom at the 2016 San Diego Comic-Con
- Born: Brian Keith Bloom; June 30, 1970 (age 56)
- Occupations: Actor; screenwriter
- Years active: 1983–present
- Relatives: Mike Bloom (brother); Scott Bloom (brother)

Brian Keith Bloom (born June 30, 1970) is an American actor and screenwriter. He co-wrote the screenplay and starred in The A-Team (2010), produced by brothers Tony and Ridley Scott. Bloom is the voice of Captain America in The Avengers: Earth's Mightiest Heroes and multiple subsequent Marvel titles. He is the voice of Varric Tethras in BioWare's Dragon Age franchise, B.J. Blazkowicz in MachineGames' Wolfenstein series, as well as multiple Call of Duty performances including Nick Reyes in Call of Duty: Infinite Warfare (2016), which he co-wrote. He was also a co-writer of Call of Duty: Modern Warfare (2019). He starred as the Punisher in Avengers Confidential: Black Widow & Punisher (2014).

== Life and career ==
Bloom was born on June 30, 1970 and raised in Merrick, New York on Long Island. He is the brother of actor Scott Bloom and musician Mike Bloom. As a child, he made his break in the Sergio Leone film Once Upon a Time in America. From there, he was offered the role of Dusty Donovan in the soap opera As the World Turns, which he played for several years. During that run, Bloom won a Daytime Emmy Award in the category of Outstanding Young Leading Man during the 12th Daytime Emmy Awards show for his performance on the series.

After leaving the soap opera, Bloom starred in several made-for-television films with teen subjects, including Crash Course (1988), Dance 'til Dawn (1988) and Desperate for Love (1989). This enhanced his appeal for later roles, which included spots in Melrose Place, 2000 Malibu Road, CSI: Miami, Law & Order: Special Victims Unit, Drive and HBO's Oz. He played the role of fanatical cult leader Jonas Sparrow in the Joss Whedon show Dollhouse. Bloom also starred in a series of 1994 television movies playing Bandit, a part loosely based on the Burt Reynolds role. Bloom continued his working relationship with Joe Carnahan, playing private mercenary antagonist "Pike" in the 2010 movie The A-Team, which Bloom also co-wrote with Carnahan, who directed the 20th Century Fox feature based on the television series. In 1989 Bloom starred alongside Burt Lancaster in the 1990 miniseries Voyage of Terror, based on the 1985 Achille Lauro ship hijacking.

Bloom also attended the sheriff’s academy and served as a reserve deputy with the Orange County Sheriff’s Department from 2001 to 2011. He is a certified self-defense expert and a Sifu of a rarefied street lethal modern Self Defense System called “Bojuka”. He has participated in combat seminars and taught use of force techniques to law enforcement, military and private security worldwide.

In 1997, Bloom developed and ran a .com hub known as AnimalWorldNetwork.com. The website was an outpost for pet products, information, video content and celebrity pet lifestyle coverage, selling and shipping fair-trade, organic and holistic pet supplies with both brick and mortar locations and a robust online presence. Bloom sold the domain and business in 2007 for an undisclosed eight-figure deal.

Bloom is well known for his long standing association with the Call of Duty franchise, having performed voiceover and motion capture work in a majority of the franchise titles culminating with the role of Captain Nick Reyes in Call of Duty: Infinite Warfare, a first-person shooter video game by Activision. Bloom is both the player character, modeled on his likeness, and the writer of the game's acclaimed narrative, for which he was nominated for 'Outstanding Achievement in Video Game Writing' by the Writers Guild of America.

== Works ==
=== Film ===
Year	Title	Role	Notes	Source
1984	Once Upon a Time in America	Young Patsy		
1985	The Stuff	Jason's Brother		
1985	Walls of Glass	Danny Flanagan		
1992	Deuce Coupe	Ray Fitzpatrick		
1996	Vampirella	Demos	Direct-to-video	
1998	DayBreak	Dr. Harry Day		
1998	The Sender	Jack Grayson		
1998	Extramarital	Bob		
1999	Knocking on Death's Door	Brad Gallagher		
1999	American Virgin	Brad		
2000	Across the Line	Walt Dernin		
2005	The Zodiac	Zodiac Killer (voice)		
2006	Right at Your Door	Police Officer		
2006	Smokin' Aces	Agent Baker		
2006	Terminal	Roger	Short film	
2010	Justice League: Crisis on Two Earths	Ultraman (voice)	Direct-to-video	
2010	The A-Team	Brock Pike	Also writer	
2012	Risen	Falco		
2012	Lego Batman: The Movie – DC Super Heroes Unite	Cyborg (voice)	Direct-to-video	
2012	Tarzan	Miller (voice)		
2014	Avengers Confidential: Black Widow & Punisher	Frank Castle / Punisher (voice)	English dub; Direct-to-video	
2022	Green Lantern: Beware My Power	Adam Strange (voice)	Direct-to-video	
2024	Justice League: Crisis on Infinite Earths	Adam Strange, Sidewinder (voice)	Direct-to-video	

=== Television ===
Year	Title	Role	Notes	Source
1983–2002	As the World Turns	Dustin "Dusty" Donovan		
1984	ABC Weekend Special	Tony DiSpirito	Episode: "A Different Twist"	
1988	Crash Course	Riko Konner	Television film	
1988	Dance 'til Dawn	Kevin McCrea	Television film	
1989	Desperate for Love	Alex Cutler	Television film	
1989	Beauty and the Beast	Cameron Benson	Episode: "The Hollow Men"	
1989	21 Jump Street	Michael Capeman	Episode: "Next Victim"	
1989	Live-In	Eric	Episode: "Kissing Cousin"	
1989	Matlock	Tony Morgen	Episode: "The Good Boy"	
1989	Empty Nest	Jimmy	Episode: "You Are 16 Going on 17 and I'm Not"	
1990	Voyage of Terror: The Achille Lauro Affair	Antonio	Television film	
1991	Over My Dead Body	Johnny Mason	Episode: "An Actor Prepares"	
1991	Brotherhood of the Gun	Zack Hollister	Television film	
1992	The Keys	Michael	Television film	
1992	2000 Malibu Road	Eric Adler	Main role	
1993	At Home with the Webbers	Josh	Television film	
1994	Bandit Goes Country	Bandit	Television film	
1994	Bandit Bandit	Bandit	Television film	
1994	Beauty and the Bandit	Bandit	Television film	
1994	Bandit's Silver Angel	Bandit	Television film	
1994	Confessions of Sorority Girls	Mort	Television film	
1994	Melrose Place	Zack Phillips	3 episodes	
1995	Touched by an Angel	Clayton Martin	Episode: "Unidentified Female"	
1996	The Nanny	John	Episode: "The Cradle Robbers"	
1996	The Colony	Mike McCann	Television film	
1997	Escape from Atlantis	Joriath	Television film	
1997	Melanie Darrow	Det. Lou Darrow	Television film	
2000	Blood Money	Tony Restrelli	Television film	
2001	Oz	Ronald "Ronnie" Barlog	2 episodes	
2001	Hostage Negotiator	Danny McBaine	Television film	
2003	CSI: Crime Scene Investigation	Kent Rifkin	Episode: "Assume Nothing"	
2003	Sealab 2021	Beck Bristow (voice)	Episode: "Meet Beck Bristow"	
2004	L.A. Dragnet	Brett Thorson	Episode: "Abduction"	
2004	CSI: Miami	Scott Riley	Episode: "Crime Wave"	
2005	McBride: Anybody Here Murder Marty?	Aaron Glover	Television film	
2005	Law & Order: Special Victims Unit	Gabriel Thomason	Episode: "Strain"	
2006	Faceless	Angel Eyes	Television film	
2006	CSI: NY	Dr. Craig Zimmer	Episode: "Cool Hunter"	
2006	Pepper Dennis	Gary	1 episode	
2006	Cold Case	Roger Felice	Episode: "Baby Blues"	
2007	Drive	Allan James, Bill, Nathan	5 episodes	
2007	Without a Trace	Christopher Douglas	Episode: "Lost Boy"	
2008	Terminator: The Sarah Connor Chronicles	Carter	Episode: "Heavy Metal"	
2009	Dollhouse	Jonas Sparrow	Episode: "True Believe"	
2010–2011	Batman: The Brave and the Bold	Captain Atom, Creeper, Iron, Oxygen, Rip Hunter (voice)	3 episodes	
2010–2011	G.I. Joe: Renegades	Zartan (voice)	4 episodes	
2010–2012	The Avengers: Earth's Mightiest Heroes	Steve Rogers / Captain America, Pitt'o Nili (voice)	38 episodes	
2012–2016	Gravity Falls	Rumble McSkirmish (voice)	4 episodes	
2012–2017	Teenage Mutant Ninja Turtles	Captain Ryan, Captain Dash Coolstar, Cyberoid X, Crognard, Muurg, Don Vizioso, additional voices	36 episodes	
2012	Blackout	Keller	3 episodes	
2013–2015	Avengers Assemble	Hyperion (voice)	10 episodes	
2019	Love, Death & Robots	Hawk (voice)	Episode: "Blind Spot"	

=== Video games ===
Year	Title	Voice role	Notes	Source
2004	EverQuest II	Generic Enemy		
2004	Jak 3	Kleiver, Wastelander #2, Freedom League Guards, Male Citizens		
2004	Call of Duty: Finest Hour	Additional voices		
2005	Battlefield 2	Grunt Soldier, additional voices		
2005	F.E.A.R.	Police		
2005	Jak X: Combat Racing	Kleiver		
2005	Need for Speed: Most Wanted	2nd Officer		
2006	Driver: Parallel Lines	Ray		
2006	Full Spectrum Warrior: Ten Hammers	Randolf, additional voices		
2006	Dreamfall: The Longest Journey	Marcus Crozier, The Guardian, Kenji		
2006	Yakuza	Additional voices	English dub	
2006	Tom Clancy's Splinter Cell: Double Agent	American Soldier, Sniper		
2006	Call of Duty 3	Sergeant Guzzo		
2007	300: March to Glory	Persian Champion, Various Spartans, Various Arcadians		
2007	Command & Conquer 3: Tiberium Wars	Militant, Sniper Team Leader		
2007	Driver '76	Ray		
2007	Fantastic Four: Rise of the Silver Surfer	Norrin Radd / Silver Surfer		
2007	Medal of Honor: Airborne	Additional voices		
2007	World in Conflict	Drill Commander		
2007	Halo 3	Brutes	Uncredited	
2007	TimeShift	Police #1		
2007	F.E.A.R. Perseus Mandate	Nightcrawler Elite, additional voices	Expansion pack	
2007	Kane & Lynch: Dead Men	Adam "Kane" Marcus		
2007	Mass Effect	Simon Atwell, additional voices		
2007	The Golden Compass	Boat Inspector, Samoyed, Trollesund		
2008	Command & Conquer 3: Kane's Wrath	Additional voices		
2008	Metal Gear Solid 4: Guns of the Patriots	Enemy Soldiers, MGO Soldiers	English dub	
2008	Silent Hill: Homecoming	Alex Shepherd		
2008	Fracture	Jet Brody		
2008	Dead Space	Baily, Bram Neumann, Crew Member, additional voices	Credited as Bryan Bloom	
2008	Tom Clancy's EndWar	Additional voices		
2008	Call of Duty: World at War – Final Fronts	Joe Miller		
2008	Rise of the Argonauts	Jason		
2009	50 Cent: Blood on the Sand	Blackwater		
2009	Halo Wars	Additional voices		
2009	Wanted: Weapons of Fate	Chicago Grunt		
2009	Red Faction: Guerilla	Additional voices		
2009	The Chronicles of Riddick: Assault on Dark Athena	Guard		
2009	Prototype	Marcus Grave		
2009	G.I. Joe: The Rise of Cobra	Recondo		
2009	F.E.A.R. 2: Reborn	Foxtrot 813	Uncredited	
2009	Marvel: Ultimate Alliance 2	Daredevil, Bullseye		
2009	Dragon Age: Origins	Leske, Dwyn, Orzammar Royal Guard, Surface Dwarf, Jarrik Dace		
2009	Jak and Daxter: The Lost Frontier	Klout		
2009	Call of Duty: Modern Warfare 2	Ranger #2, Spetsnaz Soldier, additional voices		
2010	Mass Effect 2	Keiji Okuda, Hammerhead VI		
2010	MAG	Valor Executive		
2010	Alpha Protocol	G22 Agent, Soldier		
2010	StarCraft II: Wings of Liberty	Matt Horner		
2010	Kane & Lynch 2: Dog Days	Adam "Kane" Marcus		
2010	Lara Croft and the Guardian of Light	Adam "Kane" Marcus		
2010	Mafia II	Eric Reilly, Billy "Bones" Barnes, Debt Collector		
2010	Call of Duty: Black Ops	Additional Voices		
2011	Dead Space 2	Additional voices		
2011	Marvel vs. Capcom 3: Fate of Two Worlds	Steve Rogers / Captain America		
2011	Bulletstorm	Heavy Echo Trooper		
2011	Dragon Age II	Varric Tethras		
2011	Tom Clancy's Ghost Recon: Future Soldier	Pepper, additional voices		
2011	Red Faction Armageddon	Additional voices		
2011	F.E.A.R. 3	Armacham Gunners (Shotgun)		
2011	Gears of War 3	Pilot, Guard, Drone, Boomer, additional voices		
2011	Rage	Phallinx Hagar, Clint, Sid		
2011	Uncharted 3: Drake's Deception	Additional voices		
2011	Call of Duty: Modern Warfare 3	Additional voices	Posted under Additional Voice Actors	
2011	Ultimate Marvel vs. Capcom 3	Steve Rogers / Captain America		
2011–2022	Star Wars: The Old Republic	Trooper Male		
2012	The Darkness II	Jackie Estacado		
2012	Prototype 2	Additional voices		
2012	Mass Effect 3	Overwatch Commander, additional voices		
2012	Infex	Bloom		
2012	Lego Batman 2: DC Super Heroes	Cyborg, Aquaman		
2012	Spec Ops: The Line	Marines		
2012	The Amazing Spider-Man	Thugs, Street Punk		
2012	The Secret World	John Wolf, Illuminati Envoy		
2012	Kingdom Hearts 3D: Dream Drop Distance	Black Guard B	English dub	
2012	Transformers: Fall of Cybertron	Additional voices		
2012	XCOM: Enemy Unknown	Soldier		
2012	Call of Duty: Black Ops II	Strikeforce Soldier, Navy Seal, Doorman, Multiplayer		
2013	StarCraft II: Heart of the Swarm	Matt Horner	Expansion pack	
2013	God of War: Ascension	Spartan		
2013	Gears of War: Judgment	Onyx Officer		
2013	Fuse	Dalton Brooks		
2013	Marvel Heroes	Steve Rogers / Captain America, Daredevil		
2013	Deadpool	Ranged #4, Brawler #2		
2013	Saints Row IV	Additional voices		
2013	The Bureau: XCOM Declassified	XCOM Agent		
2013	Batman: Arkham Origins	Black Mask		
2013	Batman: Arkham Origins Blackgate	Black Mask		
2013	Call of Duty: Ghosts	Keegan P. Russ, additional voices		
2013	Lightning Returns: Final Fantasy XIII	Additional voices		
2013	Titanfall	Additional voices		
2013	Wolfenstein: The New Order	William "B.J." Blazkowicz		
2013	Transformers: Rise of the Dark Spark	Autobot Soldier, Decepticon Rocket Trooper		
2013	Skylanders: Trap Team	Additional voices		
2013	Sunset Overdrive	Jess		
2013	Final Fantasy Explorers	Additional voices		
2013	Call of Duty: Advanced Warfare	Additional voices	Grouped under "Additional Cast"	
2013	Dragon Age: Inquisition	Varric Tethras		
2015	Evolve	Additional voices		
2015	Battlefield Hardline	Additional voices	Also motion capture	
2015	Wolfenstein: The Old Blood	William "B.J." Blazkowicz		
2015	Batman: Arkham Knight	Black Mask	Red Hood DLC	
2015	Mad Max	Additional voices		
2015	Skylanders: SuperChargers	Additional voices		
2015	Lego Dimensions	Aquaman, Perry White		
2015	StarCraft II: Legacy of the Void	Matt Horner	Expansion pack	
2016	XCOM 2	Central Officer Bradford		
2016	StarCraft II: Nova Covert Ops	Matt Horner	Mission packs	
2016	Call of Duty: Infinite Warfare	Commander Nick Reyes	Also writer and motion capture	
2017	Marvel vs. Capcom: Infinite	Steve Rogers / Captain America		
2017	Wolfenstein II: The New Colossus	William "B.J." Blazkowicz	Also motion capture	
2017	Kingdom Hearts HD 2.8 Final Chapter Prologue	Black Guard B	English dub	
2018	Spider-Man	Taskmaster		
2018	Quake Champions	William "B.J." Blazkowicz		
2019	Marvel Ultimate Alliance 3: The Black Order	Captain America, Daredevil, Punisher		
2019	Wolfenstein: Youngblood	William "B.J." Blazkowicz		
2019	Marvel Dimension of Heroes	Captain America	Augmented reality game for mobile devices	
2019	Call of Duty: Modern Warfare	Shane Sparks, additional voices	Also writer	
2020	Yakuza: Like a Dragon	Jo Sawashiro	English version	
2021	Marvel Future Revolution	Steve Rogers / Captain America		
2022	Call of Duty: Modern Warfare II	Additional voices	Also writer	
2022	Marvel's Midnight Suns	Captain America		
2024	Batman: Arkham Shadow	Black Mask, Johnsen, Harris		
2025	Marvel Cosmic Invasion	Steve Rogers / Captain America, Cosmic Ghost Rider, Silver Surfer		
2026	Marvel Tōkon: Fighting Souls	Captain America	English dub	

=== Theme parks ===
Year	Title	Role	Notes	Source
2012	Marvel Super Heroes 4D	Steve Rogers / Captain America		

== Awards and nominations ==
Year	Award	Category	Work	Result
1985	Daytime Emmy Award	Outstanding Younger Actor in a Drama Series	As the World Turns	Won
1985	Young Artist Award	Best Young Actor in a Daytime or Nighttime Television Series	As the World Turns	Nominated
1986	Daytime Emmy Award	Outstanding Younger Actor in a Drama Series	As the World Turns	Nominated
1987	Daytime Emmy Award	Outstanding Younger Actor in a Drama Series	As the World Turns	Nominated
2016	Writers Guild Award	Outstanding Achievement in Video Game Writing	Call of Duty: Infinite Warfare	Nominated
2017	The Game Awards 2017	Best Performance	Wolfenstein II: The New Colossus	Nominated
