= Red Faction (video game) =

2001 video game

- Cover art for console versions
- Developer: Volition (Note: The N-Gage version was developed by Monkeystone Games and the mobile version was developed by Blue Beck.)
- Publishers: THQ; THQ Nordic (backward compatibility re-release)
- Designer: Alan Lawrance
- Programmer: John Slagel
- Artist: Frank Capezzutto III
- Writers: Mike Breault; Jason Scott; Maureen Tan
- Composer: Dan Wentz
- Series: Red Faction
- Platforms: PlayStation 2; Windows; Mac OS; OS X; N-Gage; Mobile phone
- Release: May 22, 2001: PlayStation 2; NA: May 22, 2001; EU: June 22, 2001 Windows; NA: September 18, 2001; EU: September 28, 2001 Mac OS November 28, 2001 OS X January 4, 2002 N-Gage; NA: December 9, 2003; EU: December 12, 2003 Mobile October 20, 2005
- Genre: First-person shooter
- Modes: Single-player, multiplayer

Red Faction is a first-person shooter video game developed by Volition and published by THQ for PlayStation 2 and Microsoft Windows in 2001, and Macintosh platforms in 2001 and 2002. A version for the N-Gage was developed by Monkeystone Games, and the mobile version was developed by Blue Beck. The game was ported to PlayStation 4 by Plaion and published by THQ Nordic in 2016 and released in both physical and digital copies. The game was inspired by several works of contemporary science fiction.

Red Faction takes place on Mars in the late 21st century. The player controls a miner, Parker, who helps lead a rebellion against the Ultor Corporation. The premiere feature of the game is its "Geo-Mod" technology, short for "geometry modification", which provided destructible environments, allowing the player to destroy certain sections of the scenery in the game. For example, instead of opening a door, a player could blast through the rock surrounding the door. The game sold more than 1,000,000 units by 2002.

On November 29, 2016, the game was made available for the PlayStation 4 through the PlayStation Network with added features such as trophy support and widescreen resolutions.

== Gameplay ==
With Geo-Mod, the player can destroy this bridge, causing the APC to fall into the chasm below.

The game features GeoMod technology, which allows players to significantly alter and otherwise affect the surrounding terrain and buildings, either with explosives or otherwise. Past games allowed limited alteration of the environment through scripted means or special triggered areas that added or removed certain predefined level elements. Red Faction was the first video game that allowed players unscripted level-altering possibilities.

The PC version of Red Faction includes an extra level called "Glass House" which allows the player to experiment with GeoMod as a mechanic in a sandbox environment.

The PS2 version uses offline split-screen multiplayer featuring deathmatch rounds with AI bots and up to 4 human players. The PC release of the game, in addition to its offline LAN mode, has competitive online multiplayer featuring deathmatch, team deathmatch, and capture the flag gameplay for up to 32 human players on 25 maps. 2 additional multiplayer levels for the PC version were each included as exclusive content for players who purchased the game from either GameStop or Electronics Boutique. The later PS3 and PS4 releases are direct ports of the PS2 version and include no multiplayer functionality.

== Plot ==
Red Faction takes place on Mars around the year 2075. Earth's minerals are being depleted and humans need more of them to survive. The vast Ultor Corporation runs the mining operation on Mars. The living conditions are deplorable, human rights for the miners are few, and a disease called "The Plague" is running rampant throughout the colony with no known antidote available—predominantly within the confines of the mine complex. Parker, a downtrodden miner, came to Mars to make a new start in his life—taken in by the promises and advantages Ultor has to offer in the mines of Mars. After a routine day in the mine with the typical aggression toward miners and cramped living conditions and poor nutrition, he witnesses the spark that starts a rebellion when a security guard abuses a miner at the end of his shift and attempts to attack him, causing the miner to fight back and kill the security guard. Parker takes up arms, with the help of Hendrix, a rebellious Ultor security technician who guides Parker through the complex. Hendrix tries to get Parker to join up with a group of miners who are about to steal a supply shuttle and escape the complex, but Parker arrives too late. The shuttle takes off, and is destroyed by missiles moments later.

Parker traverses through the Ultor complex, eliminating any resistance Ultor throws at him, and even (with the help of Orion, a high-ranking Red Faction member) kidnapping a high-ranking Ultor administrator, Gryphon, for Eos, leader of the Red Faction. Parker learns from Gryphon about Dr. Capek, who created "The Plague". Capek has been experimenting with nanotechnology, and the Plague is a side-effect of injections at the miners' annual medical checkup. Hendrix directs Parker to Capek's secret underground laboratory, where he and Eos meet up and take down Capek. As Capek dies, he tells Eos there is a cure for the Plague but refuses to tell her how to make it and dies. With Capek dead, the lab's self-destruction sequence initiates. Eos stays behind to find the files on the cure while Parker continues to the Communications center. After sending a distress call to the Earth Defense Force, Parker destroys the missile defense system, so that he can stow away on a shuttle to an Ultor space station in Martian orbit to deactivate a laser defense system without getting shot down.

After destroying the space station, Parker lands back on Mars via an escape pod, Ultor brings out its reserve of mercenaries to help them in their fight against the miners. Hendrix tells Parker that the mercenaries have orders to destroy the mining complex, covering up any proof of Ultor's wrongdoing, Hendrix is killed soon after this by the mercenaries. After fighting his way through the mercenary base, Parker confronts Masako, the mercenary leader. After he kills Masako, Parker sees that Eos is tied up and sitting on the floor next to the bomb, which has been set to explode. After deactivating it, the Earth Defense Force arrives just in time to save Parker and Eos from a fighter aircraft. Eos tells Parker that an antidote for the Plague has been made and it is being given to any sick miners. She also tells him she is leaving Mars, and that Parker should enjoy his new status as a hero.

== Development ==
Descent 4 was a game being developed by Volition as part of the Descent game franchise, as a prequel to Descent. However, it was cancelled and the technology behind it and some of the plot were incorporated into Red Faction. Examples include the main character Parker as well as the GeoMod engine.

Similarities between Red Faction and the 1990 film Total Recall have been pointed out, with its setting on Mars and the rebellion against the guards. Lead designer Alan Lawrance acknowledged the similarities in a 2014 interview but stated the film was not used as the main inspiration; any connection is purely coincidental.

Red Faction entered a pre-production phase in 1998. The original intention was for every part of the game to be destructible but this was reduced in scope due to technical challenges and the requirement to guide the player through a linear game. It was created by a small team on a relatively limited budget, and released in 2001.

The N-Gage version was developed by John Romero's studio Monkeystone Games.

== Reception ==
Reception

Aggregate scores
Aggregator	Score			
Aggregator	mobile	N-Gage	PC	PS2
GameRankings	64%	57%	78%	88%
Metacritic	N/A	55/100	78/100	88/100

Review scores
Publication	Score			
Publication	mobile	N-Gage	PC	PS2
AllGame	N/A	N/A	3.5/5	4/5
Computer Gaming World	N/A	N/A	3/5	N/A
Electronic Gaming Monthly	N/A	N/A	N/A	8.67/10 (Note: In Electronic Gaming Monthly's review of the PlayStation 2 version, one critic gave it 9/10, and the rest gave it each a score of 8.5/10.)
EP Daily	N/A	N/A	7/10	8.5/10
Eurogamer	N/A	5/10	7/10	9/10
Game Informer	N/A	5.75/10	8.75/10	9/10
GameRevolution	N/A	N/A	B	B
GameSpot	N/A	3.4/10	7.9/10	8.8/10
GameSpy	N/A	3/5	89%	84%
GameZone	N/A	6.5/10	8/10	9/10
IGN	6.4/10	7.3/10	8.8/10	9.1/10
Next Generation	N/A	N/A	3/5	4/5
Official U.S. PlayStation Magazine	N/A	N/A	N/A	5/5
PC Gamer (US)	N/A	N/A	85%	N/A
The Cincinnati Enquirer	N/A	4/5	N/A	N/A
Playboy	N/A	N/A	N/A	90%

The PS2 and PC versions of Red Faction received "generally favorable reviews", while the N-Gage version received "mixed or average" reviews, according to the review aggregation website Metacritic.

For the PS2 version, IGN called it "an absolute must-have game for the PlayStation 2, and it's the best single-player first-person shooter by a long shot". GameSpot stated, "Although Red Faction rarely outstrips the games it draws inspiration from, the fact that there are times when it shows them up at all is pretty impressive." PlanetPS2 commented, "Red Faction delivers a satisfying, if slightly flawed single player experience and a distracting, but ultimately shallow multiplayer mode. The graphics are impressive, and the technology introduced in this game is amazing, it's just unfortunate that it hasn't been used to its fullest potential." Chester "Chet" Barber of NextGen said in its July 2001 issue, "Although Red Faction isn't the most inventive FPS out there, it proves to be worthy with a solid single-player mode." Jason D'Aprile of Extended Play gave it four stars out of five, saying, "To say Red Faction is the best shooter on the PS2 doesn't do it justice -- it's one of the best shooters available for any system, and easily one of the best games on the PlayStation2 [sic]. Mixing tried, true, and blisteringly entertaining action with superb AI, innovative game design elements, and a constantly moving storyline to drive this long and challenging shooter forward, Red Faction manages to shoot a breath of fresh air into the whole genre. If you love great action, go out and get this game." However, Edge gave it the lowest score of five out of ten. Uncle Dust of GamePro said, "Red Faction hits the mark, combining superior technology and awesome graphics with an intense, lengthy, and satisfying story line to keep gamers fighting for the rebellion with all they've got." (Note: GamePro gave the PlayStation 2 version two 4.5/5 scores for graphics and sound, 4/5 for control, and 5/5 for fun factor.)

For the PC version, IGN stated, "It's all about the gameplay, and when you crank this baby to hard or, God forbid, im-freaking-possible, you'll find the gameplay to keep you going for hours piled upon days, piled upon weeks." PC Gamer commented, "As far as looks go, Red Faction is more like the cute girl next door than a hot fashion model from the Upper West Side: It's pretty, but it won't make a man drop to his knees and thank God for giving him sight." GameSpot noted, "Its relative lack of originality can ... undermine Red Faction's appeal for more-experienced players, for whom the game will provide mostly familiar territory. Nevertheless, Red Faction is an accomplished shooter in its own right." GameRevolution called the game "a fine FPS with plenty of action and intense gameplay, even if it is derivative, too short and a tad uninspired." However, Jeff Lundrigan of NextGen said in its December 2001 issue, "Red Faction on PC is well worth playing for its engaging storyline and varied gameplay, but as a PC title, it's enjoyable without being especially notable." Steve Bauman of Computer Games Magazine gave it three stars out of five, saying, "It has the setup, but its drab, by-the-numbers execution lacks any flair."

Maxim gave the PS2 version all five stars and said, "We have to admit that most first-person games nauseate us, but [Red Faction]'s smooth graphics and easy gameplay make it hard to put down." Playboy gave the same console version a score of 90% and stated, "Virtually every element of Red Faction is nicely polished – even the controls are intuitive, unlike most console shooters, which make PC gaming vets long for a keyboard and mouse." The Cincinnati Enquirer gave the N-Gage version four stars out of five and called it "a clever port from the popular console and PC versions". Star Dingo of GamePro, however, said of the same N-Gage version, "To be honest, the levels (small and right-angle-filled as they are) are fairly well-balanced in terms of weapon and enemy placement; the music generates atmosphere; and there are good vocal and audio cues. But first-person shooters weren't a good idea on the Game Boy Advance. Turns out they're not really the best idea on a cell phone, either." (Note: GamePro gave the N-Gage version three 2.5/5 scores for graphics, control, and fun factor, and 3.5/5 for sound.)

The PC version was nominated at The Electric Playground's 2001 Blister Awards for "Most Artistic PC Game", but lost to Myst III: Exile.

== Sequels ==
The sequel, Red Faction II, was released for PlayStation 2 in October 2002, then GameCube, Xbox and Microsoft Windows the following year. It takes place on Earth and tells the story of a group of supersoldiers, including the main character, who are physically enhanced by the nanotechnology originally developed by Capek on Mars.

On June 15, 2009, THQ released Red Faction: Guerrilla, for the Xbox 360, PlayStation 3 and Microsoft Windows. In this iteration, the story again takes place on Mars, where the Earth Defense Force has become as tyrannical an organization as Ultor.

Developed by Locomotive Games, a spin-off of the Red Faction games called Red Faction: B.E.A.S.T. was in a pre-alpha development stage for the Nintendo Wii video game console. However, with the closure of Locomotive Games the game has been abandoned, although several models and a full-length trailer were released to the public upon the closure of the studio.

On June 4, 2010, the next installment was announced with the trailer for Red Faction: Armageddon. The story occurs approximately 50 years after the events of Red Faction: Guerrilla. Players assume the role of Darius Mason, grandson of Alec and Samanya from the last installment of the series. In Armageddon, the Martian colonists now reside underground following the destruction of the machine responsible for terraforming Mars. Years after this event, creatures encountered in the first game are again released. Red Faction: Armageddon was released on June 7, 2011.
