= Mike Bloom =

Mike Bloom or Michael Bloom may refer to:

- Mike Bloom (musician) (born 1975), plays with Rilo Kiley and The Elected
- Mike Bloom (basketball) (1915–1993), NBA player in the 1940s who played for the Celtics and the Lakers
- Mike Bloom (ice hockey) (born 1952), NHL player in the 1970s who played for the Capitals and the Red Wings
