= Red Faction =

Video game series

- Genres: First-person shooter Third-person shooter
- Developer: Volition
- Publishers: THQ (2001–2013); THQ Nordic (2013–2020); Deep Silver (2020–present)
- Platforms: PlayStation 2, Microsoft Windows, macOS, GameCube, Xbox, N-Gage, PlayStation 3, Xbox 360, PlayStation 4, Xbox One, Nintendo Switch
- First release: Red Faction; May 22, 2001
- Latest release: Red Faction: Guerrilla Re-Mars-tered; July 3, 2018

Red Faction is a series of shooter video games developed by Volition and owned by Plaion. Originating in 2001, the Red Faction games have spanned Microsoft Windows, macOS and consoles, including the PlayStation 2, GameCube, Xbox, PlayStation 3 and Xbox 360. Original developers Volition have retained the rights to the series since 2020, with no updates provided on whether a future fifth game (since 2011) is in the works.

The series is known for the struggle of the working people (usually miners) of Mars fighting for independence from off world oppressors, including foreign corporations that extract their resources from the planet, and the collective world government of Earth.

== Gameplay ==
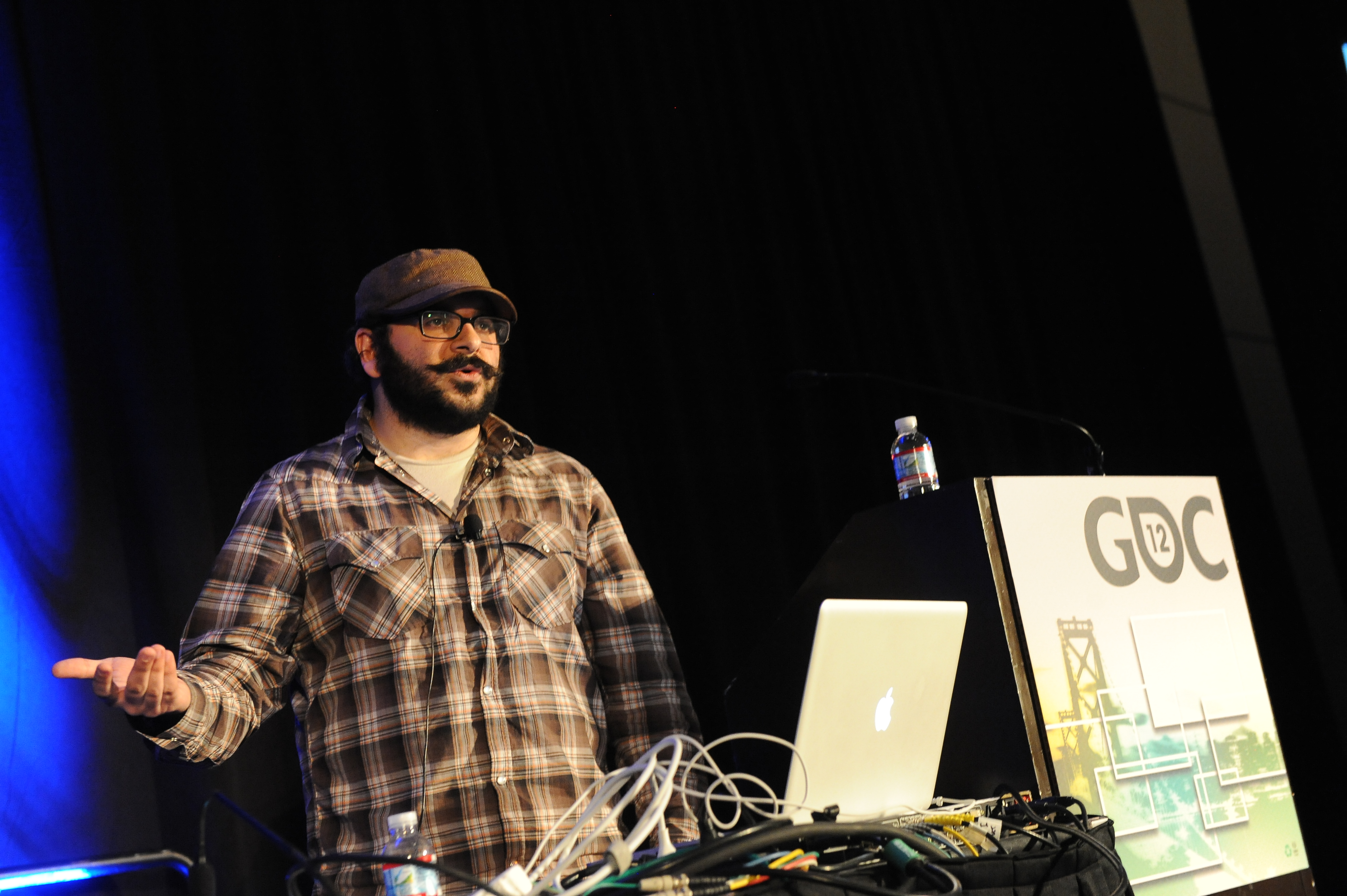
Dave Samuel of Volition presenting at GDC 2012 on "Communication & Iteration of Visual Effects in Red Faction"

The series has had three unique styles of gameplay. The first is a traditional first-person shooter element which was used by the first two games in the series, while the second is a third-person style of open world gameplay which was used in Red Faction: Guerrilla, and a third-person style of corridor shooter used in Red Faction: Armageddon. Both styles share a common element, the series' unique environmental destruction features. This was enhanced in Red Faction: Guerrilla when it was applied to every building in the game making the game's entire environment (except for the terrain itself) destructible.

The first two games were traditional first-person shooters with unique environmental destruction features that were praised in both games. The games include vehicles, pistols, rifles, explosives, and other traditional shooter weapons and features. While the first two games did not re-invent the first-person shooter genre, their Geo-Mod Engine and rebellious story made both games a new step for the genre.

Rather than the traditional first-person shooter style of the first two games, both Guerrilla and Armageddon utilize a third-person style of gameplay. Guerrilla takes place in an open world environment on the planet of Mars allowing players to freely roam across the environment. Armageddon is a more linear experience, largely moving through corridors and caverns from objective to objective. In the games, all environments are fully destructible which means that every single building in the game can be destroyed. Players are usually equipped with four weapons, the primary weapon is a sledgehammer with three more weapons of the player's choice. These weapons are mainly purchased using salvage, the main currency of the game, with the exception of the remote charges and assault rifle, both of which are given to the player by default at the start of the game. Purchasable weapons include an Arc Rifle, Grinder, Rocket Launcher, Proximity Mines and a Nano Rifle, the last of which is effective for remote demolitions. Players go around completing missions for the Red Faction and perform guerrilla actions to liberate various sectors of Mars from the control of the Earth Defense Force.

In each game for the series, an engine called Geo-Mod, short for "Geometry Modification" technology, is present in some form. The Geo-Mod engine enables the player to destroy parts of the walls, floors, and other features of the levels in a non-predefined manner using various explosive weapons. For Red Faction: Guerrilla, the engine, now based on the Saints Row engine, was originally planned to be called RED, short for Realtime Environment Destruction, but later renamed as Geo-Mod 2.0, which allowed for the free-form destruction of buildings and other structures. Geo-Mod was updated to version 2.5 within Red Faction: Armageddon. Though Volition had planned to include Geo-Mod in Saints Row: The Third, it did not make it into the final game.

== Games ==
=== Red Faction (2001) ===
Red Faction is the first game in the Red Faction franchise that was originally released in mid-2001 and later re-released for other platforms. Red Faction was also the first game to run on the Geo-Mod engine that allowed for unprecedented environmental destruction. The game takes place on Mars in the year 2075. The protagonist, Parker, is a miner who came to Mars seeking a better life away from Earth. Instead, he finds that the Ultor Corporation abuses the workers and forces them to endure hazardous living conditions. A plague of an unknown origin sweeps through the colony, but Ultor does nothing to halt its propagation or to provide for the sick, prompting an uprising from the miners.

=== Red Faction II (2002) ===
Red Faction II is the sequel to Red Faction. The game was released in October 2002 for the PlayStation 2, and early 2003 for other platforms. Red Faction II is an earth-based FPS that mostly deviated from the story set in Red Faction, only keeping minor plot details. Taking place on Earth in the year 2080, the protagonist, Alias, is a genetically enhanced supersoldier formerly employed by the Ultor Corporation. Nanotechnology developed by Dr. Capek (see Red Faction) has fallen into the hands of the EDF (who is now associated with Ultor) and many other terrorist groups. A dictatorship, “The Commonwealth,” has employed Alias to retrieve nanotechnology and other data.

=== Red Faction: Guerrilla (2009) ===
Red Faction: Guerrilla is the third installment of the Red Faction franchise. The game assumes a third-person point of view and an open world to play in. The game was released on some platforms on June 2, 2009, seven years after its predecessor and featured a vastly different gameplay system. Red Faction: Guerrilla takes place in 2125. The Earth Defense Force (EDF), the allies in the original "Red Faction", have become the main antagonist of Guerrilla. Earth's natural resources have run scarce, and as a result, its global economy has collapsed from rampant speculation of commodities and lack of production. Under pressure by Earth's corporations and leaders to acquire the resources of Mars at any cost and at a pace to meet Earth's high demand, the EDF has forced Martian society into a permanent state of unfree labour. The newly-reformed "Red Faction" arises to rebel against the EDF (Earth Defense Force), drive them off the planet, and begin fairer negotiations with Earth.

A remaster was released in 2018 titled Red Faction: Guerilla Re-Mars-tered.

=== Red Faction: Battlegrounds (2011) ===
Red Faction: Battlegrounds was released as a combat vehicular multi-directional shooter in 2011 for Xbox Live Arcade and PlayStation Network for the promotion of Red Faction: Armageddon.

=== Red Faction: Armageddon (2011) ===
On June 4, 2010, the first footage of Red Faction: Armageddon debuted in the form of a short teaser trailer on GameTrailers. THQ announced that the game would be shown at the Electronic Entertainment Expo 2010.

Like its predecessor Red Faction: Guerrilla, Red Faction: Armageddon is a third-person shooter. The player takes on the role of Darius Mason, a descendant of Guerrilla's Alec Mason. The game is set 50 years after the conclusion of Guerrilla. Most of the game is set in a tunnel complex inhabited by alien creatures.

As in previous games in the franchise, landscape destruction is possible through the "Geo-Mod" feature. In this game, the player can use a device called a Nano Forge to repair structures such as stairs, allowing them to progress through the caves. Audio logs can be found throughout the complex. When played they provide elements of backstory. Various vehicles can be used including a mine cart and a barge. The player can also use mech suits at some points in the game.

On June 27, 2011, THQ announced it was dropping the long-running Red Faction franchise; no more installments are in development due to poor sales of Armageddon.

== Future ==
On December 19, 2012, THQ filed for Chapter 11 bankruptcy leading to an auction of THQ's properties that was held on January 22, 2013. While developer Volition was picked up by Deep Silver along with Saints Row, Red Faction was not a part of the transaction. On April 22, 2013, Red Faction was purchased by Nordic Games in the final transaction of THQ's assets. After its purchase, Nordic Games CEO Lars Wingefors stated they either wanted to work with the original creators or best possible developer to work on sequels or additional content. After hearing of the Red Faction IP purchase by Nordic Games, Volition's general manager Dan Cermak expressed much relief that Red Faction is in comfortable hands but has stated Volition will no longer continue the Red Faction series. In February 2018, Deep Silver was bought by Nordic Games, which had since renamed itself THQ Nordic. In May 2020 the rights for the series were transferred to Koch Media, thereby returning the rights to Volition. Volition shut down in August 2023 and Red Faction was transferred back to Koch Media which was now named Plaion.

== Cancelled game ==
=== Red Faction: B.E.A.S.T. ===
Red Faction: B.E.A.S.T. was an intended spinoff title of the series. It was being developed by Locomotive Games and was planned to release on the Nintendo Wii. THQ however decided to close down the Locomotive Games studio and cancelled the prototype game in the process. While B.E.A.S.T. was never officially announced, a trailer and screenshots leaked on January 15 after the cancellation by THQ employees were released and the game's existence was confirmed. The trailer showcased the new Geo-Mod technology along with the Wii's graphical capabilities. Further shown features were the third person perspective with accompanying cover system. The game's development rights reverted to THQ, who has no plans to continue production.

The game, as revealed by a leaked video, was primarily a third person shooter. The game was being designed entirely around the Wii Remote and would have included Wii MotionPlus technology. It featured a cover system akin to Red Faction: Guerrilla and earned positive comparisons to that of Gears of War. While having a new game engine being tailored especially for the Wii, the game still would have had integrated series staple Geo-Mod capabilities, which would allow players to use vehicles and weapons to modify the environment, namely terrain and buildings to the point of crumbling or collapsing.

== Other tie-ins ==
To tie in with the release of Red Faction: Armageddon, Volition released a downloadable mini-game. Red Faction: Battlegrounds is a top-down twin-stick vehicle-based shooter which is available via Xbox Live and PlayStation Network. The mini-game was produced by Juice Games for Volition. The release date was April 5, 2011, beta invites were sent to a select group of PlayStation Plus subscribers on September 21, 2010. The Xbox Live version became backwards compatible on Xbox One on June 23, 2016. Red Faction: Origins is a feature-length television movie produced by Syfy that coincided with Red Faction: Armageddon. The channel announced the film on April 16, 2010. Volition confirmed the title of the film and its May 2011 release date on July 19, 2010. The film is set in-between the events of Red Faction: Guerrilla and Armageddon.

== Reception ==
Aggregate review scores As of June 2, 2011.
Game	Metacritic
Red Faction	(PS2) 88 (PC) 78
Red Faction II	(PS2) 84 (GC) 79 (Xbox) 74 (PC) 64
Red Faction: Guerrilla	(PS3) 85 (X360) 85 (PC) 82
Red Faction: Armageddon	(PC) 75 (X360) 71 (PS3) 71

The series has generally received positive reviews, with the original Red Faction and third installment Red Faction: Guerrilla getting the most acclaim, while Red Faction II and Red Faction: Armageddon received lower scores. Some common flaws are that the graphics are considered behind their time or unremarkable. Also, the scattered story and limited interactivity in the levels have been criticized overall. On the positive side, the series has been deeply commended for its unique geometry modification capabilities, intelligent AI, and prevalent storytelling themes.

Praised for its long play time, great gameplay, and smart AI, Red Faction was generally given average to great reviews by critics. The game was also criticized for its scattered story and mediocre graphics. GameSpot gave the game a great review saying, "It's a great big game with much to explore and enemies tough enough to make it worth playing through more than once." GameSpot awarded the game with an 8.9, giving it a rating of "great". GameSpy awarded the game an overall score of 89/100 and called the PC version, "the best and most well-rounded first-person shooter released in a long time."

Red Faction II's short campaign and lack of online multiplayer has diminished reviews by many critics. However, redeeming features include dual wielding, great multiplayer (split screen), and improved graphics. For these and other reasons, GameSpot awarded the game an 8.3/10.0, earning it the rank of "Great". IGN's positive side of their review called the game "a very solid, well-produced first-person shooter", but their complaints stated that: "Volition still shows some room for improvement when it comes to level design, spots of AI, and implementing the vast potential of the Geo-Mod concept". Despite their complaints, IGN gave Red Faction II a 9.2/10, an "Outstanding" ranking. The PC version of Red Faction II was far less well-received, with IGN criticizing the port's average looking graphics and incredibly short, though enjoyable while it lasted single player mode.
