= Square (band) =

US musical group

- Also known as: Happy Dog
- Origin: Lincoln, Nebraska, United States
- Genres: Rock, pop, jazz fusion
- Years active: 1999–2001
- Past members: Sean Beste; James Valentine; Ryland Steen
- Website: squaresounds.com

Square was a short-lived musical trio from Lincoln, Nebraska who moved to Southern California in early 2000. It was composed of Sean Beste (vocals and keyboards), James Valentine (guitars) and Ryland Steen (drums). Their sound has been described as including elements of rock, pop, and jazz fusion.

The band moved to Orange County after entering an Ernie Ball-sponsored band competition. They won the grand prize, beating 600 other entrants. Shortly after winning the competition, they released their only full-length album, This Magnificent Nonsence, on an indie label called Lucy Smith Music. The band started playing many gigs in the area, including some with local band Kara's Flowers. Around 2001, they briefly added guitarist Gannin Arnold to the lineup.

In 2001, the members of Kara's Flowers asked Valentine to join their group, an invitation that he accepted, effectively dissolving Square. Kara's Flowers changed its name to Maroon 5 and became one of the most commercially successful acts of the mid-2000s. Steen later joined the established ska band Reel Big Fish. Beste (who was initially upset and unhappy by Valentine's decision to leave Square but says he no longer harbors any ill will) started a band called The Excuse and moved to Portland, Oregon for several years. He has since returned to the Los Angeles area and has done some work with the band Maxeen.

== Band members ==
- Sean Beste – vocals, keyboards, bass
- James Valentine – guitars
- Ryland Steen – drums
