= Red Faction II =

2002 video game

- North American PlayStation 2 cover art
- Developer: Volition (Note: Ported to Windows and Xbox by Outrage Games, while Cranky Pants Games developed the GameCube version.)
- Publisher: THQ
- Producer: Clint Ourso
- Designer: Nathan Camarillo
- Programmer: Alan Lawrance
- Artist: Jasen Whiteside
- Writer: Maureen Tan
- Composers: Dan Wentz; Franky Vivid; Kate Marlin-Nelson
- Series: Red Faction
- Platforms: PlayStation 2 GameCube; Windows; Xbox
- Release: PlayStation 2: NA: October 16, 2002; EU: November 15, 2002; GameCube, Windows, and Xbox: NA: April 1, 2003; EU: June 6, 2003; AU: June 13, 2003 (GCN)
- Genre: First-person shooter
- Modes: Single-player, multiplayer

Red Faction II is a 2002 first-person shooter video game developed by Volition and published by THQ for the PlayStation 2, GameCube, Windows and Xbox. It is the sequel to Red Faction and the second installment in the Red Faction series. The game changed the direction of the first game by introducing a greater emphasis on action and a new setting on Earth, rather than Mars.

== Gameplay ==
Unlike its predecessor which is set on Mars, Red Faction II is set on Earth.

=== Multiplayer ===
Red Faction II features local multiplayer. Deathmatch, Bagman, Arena (all available with either individual or team play), Capture the Flag, and "Regime" (an unlockable mode equivalent to Bagman) can be played across a selection of around 40 levels, each with destructible walls. Every game mode except Capture the Flag has the same stage set; Capture the Flag has another set of levels dedicated to it.

Players can also create their own bots. Bots, like the human players, are able to keep statistics pertaining to gameplay. Bots obtain more statistic points as they fight matches in multiplayer, which allows the player to upgrade their abilities as they are used. These statistics include Health, Damage, Agility, and Accuracy. There are also two other stats pertaining to their gameplay: Camping Tendency and Aggressiveness.

== Plot ==
In 2080, 5 years after the events of Red Faction, the nanotechnology developed by Axel Capek, the head scientist of the Ultor Corporation before its fall, has been claimed by the Earth Defense Force (EDF). With this technology, the EDF commences a reorganization of the Ultor Corporation, focusing on enhanced supersoldiers and suitable weaponry. However, the research that Capek did in his laboratories has been consequently stolen by other militant groups and assorted terrorist organizations. This has continued for years; the research has often changed hands in the criminal underworld. The player is introduced to their role as an explosives expert (codenamed "Alias") as he embarks on a special operations mission to claim the research data for the Republic of the Commonwealth.

Eventually, the research is successfully claimed by the elite forces of Victor Sopot, Chancellor of the dystopic military state known as The Commonwealth. Sopot uses nanotechnology to enhance his formidable military forces, successfully creating the first supersoldiers with the research data. However, fearing the potential of his new supersoldiers, he orders them all to be hunted down, executed, and replaced with far less intelligent, mutated horrors known as "The Processed". Collectively betrayed by their leader, the player's squad flees underground and allies itself with the Red Faction as mercenaries. At this point in the story, the Red Faction is an organized resistance movement strongly opposed to the rule of Sopot and the skewed political tenets of the Commonwealth. The squad eventually pursues Sopot and neutralizes all opposition in their way as the Red Faction takes the conflict to the streets in a joint uprising against the rule of The Commonwealth. During the initial stages of the game, the Red Faction and the squad mutually support each other as they overcome shared objectives such as sabotaging propaganda installations. The uprising culminates in successfully trapping Sopot in his missile silo and executing him.

Alias returns to the makeshift base of operations only to discover that all of the Red Faction resistance members present have been brutally slaughtered. The squad's leader, Molov, remarks that with Sopot dead and the nanotech research in his possession, the Commonwealth's military forces have voluntarily pledged allegiance to him. He declares Alias and Tangier to be enemies of the state for supporting the Red Faction. Tangier helps Alias escape, and shortly after fleeing to safety, Alias lends aid to surviving Red Faction members who are defending themselves from the enemy. Alias meets with Echo, the leader of the Red Faction, in a secret location to discuss an alternate strategy to stop Molov. Echo is killed in action during a firefight with Quill, a former squad member. Tangier radios Alias soon afterward, and the two agree to shut down Molov's commandeered nanotech laboratory located within the colossal statue of Sopot. Inside the laboratory, Alias triumphs over Repta, a former squad member, and destroys the nanotech laboratory's power generators. Alias's explosives weaken the foundation of the statue and render it unstable. Alias encounters Repta again and once again triumphs over him, causing the energy field within Repta to reach critical mass.

Alias and Tangier meet up and pursue Molov, who is scaling Sopot's statue with the nanotech cell – the culmination of Capek's research – and awaiting extraction from Shrike, Molov's subordinate. Shrike betrays his commanding officer, and Tangier reclaims the nanotech cell from Molov's possession. Molov, desperate to eliminate his enemies, climbs aboard a nearby battle armor and launches a frenzied assault against Alias. Using the destructible environment to his advantage, Alias manages to evade Molov's fire and launches a counterattack that kills Molov and destroys the statue. Shrike swoops in with his close air support craft to extract Alias as the statue crumbles. From this point, the story ends in one of four possible ways, depending on the player's Heroics score.

== Reception ==
Reception

Aggregate score
Aggregator	Score			
Aggregator	GameCube	PC	PS2	Xbox
Metacritic	79/100	64/100	84/100	74/100

Review scores
Publication	Score			
Publication	GameCube	PC	PS2	Xbox
Electronic Gaming Monthly	N/A	N/A	7.5/10	7.5/10
Eurogamer	N/A	N/A	8/10	N/A
Game Informer	8.75/10	N/A	8.75/10	8.25/10
GamePro	4/5	N/A	4.5/5	4/5
GameRevolution	N/A	N/A	B+	N/A
GameSpot	7.3/10	7/10	8.3/10	7.4/10
GameSpy	N/A	N/A	4.5/5	N/A
GameZone	8.6/10	6.5/10	9/10	8.5/10
IGN	8.3/10	7.4/10	9.2/10	8.3/10
Nintendo Power	4.2/5	N/A	N/A	N/A
Official U.S. PlayStation Magazine	N/A	N/A	4/5	N/A
Official Xbox Magazine (US)	N/A	N/A	N/A	8.3/10
PC Gamer (US)	N/A	72%	N/A	N/A
Entertainment Weekly	N/A	N/A	B+	N/A
The Village Voice	N/A	N/A	N/A	7/10

The PS2 and GCN versions received "favorable" reviews, while the Xbox and PC versions received "mixed or average reviews", according to the review aggregation website Metacritic.

Many criticized the game's short campaign and lack of online multiplayer. Redeeming features include dual-wielding, great split-screen multiplayer, and improved graphics. IGN's positive side of their review called the PS2 version "a very solid, well-produced first-person shooter", but their complaints stated that: "Volition still shows some room for improvement when it comes to level design, spots of AI, and implementing the vast potential of the Geo-Mod concept." IGN was more negative about the Windows version, criticizing the port's average-looking graphics and incredibly short single-player campaign. Eurogamer said the PS2 version was enjoyable but not particularly innovative. They recommended it to fans of the original game whilst conceding that Red Faction II was "not the best example of its fiercely competitive genre." Edge gave the same console version a score of six out of ten.

== Sequel ==
A sequel, Red Faction: Guerrilla, was released in 2009 for the PlayStation 3, Xbox 360 and Windows.
