= The Elected =

American indie rock group (2004–2011)

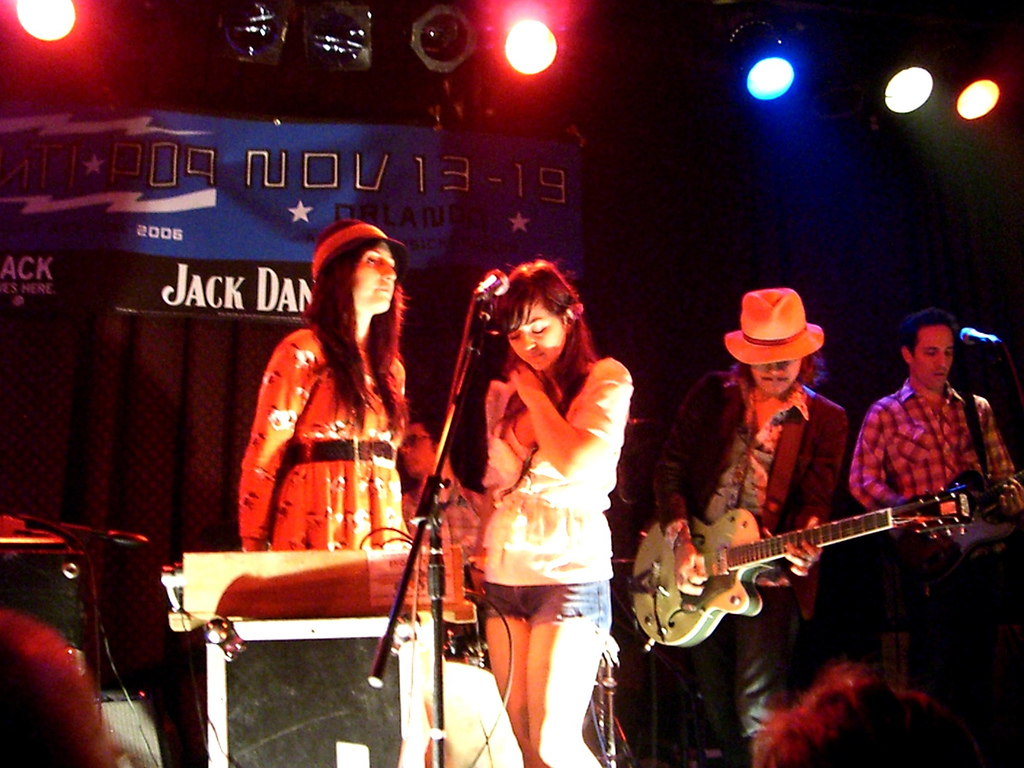
- The Elected Live at the Orlando Social, 2006.

Background information
- Origin: Los Angeles, California, United States
- Genres: Indie rock
- Years active: 2004–2011
- Labels: Sub Pop, Vagrant
- Past members: Blake Sennett; Mike Bloom; Daniel Brummel; Michael Runion; Jason Boesel; Ryland Steen; Sander Steen
- Website: theelectedband.com

The Elected were a Los Angeles–based indie rock band. The Elected have released two albums with Sub Pop: Me First in 2004, and Sun, Sun, Sun in 2006. A third album, Bury Me In My Rings, was released on May 17, 2011.

== Members ==
- Blake Sennett – guitar, keyboards, vocals
- Mike Bloom – guitar, lap steel, keyboards
- Daniel Brummel/Michael Runion/Nate Greely – Bass
- Jason Boesel/Ryland Steen/Sander Steen – Drums

Sennett, Boesel and Bloom were also members of Rilo Kiley. Daniel Brummel plays with Ozma as well. Michael Runion plays solo when not playing live with The Elected. Ryland Steen currently plays with Reel Big Fish, while his younger brother Sander Steen is currently touring with The Elected. Nate Greely, former member of Sub Pop band Arlo, also currently tours with The Elected.

Their second album, Sun, Sun, Sun was released on 24 January 2006 via Sub Pop Records.

After taking time off from the music business, Blake Sennett returned with a third Elected album entitled Bury Me In My Rings, which was released on 17 May 2011 via Vagrant Records. Described as "complete with twelve shimmering pop songs reminiscent of mid-century West Coast rock", Sennett played most instruments and produced the album himself: “I played most of the instruments myself, so it was easier to erase stuff without hurting anyone’s feelings. This time I just thought, better take it as far as I can alone… then bring in my friends to fill in the blanks.”

== Discography ==
=== Albums ===
- Me First (2004, Sub Pop)
- Sun, Sun, Sun (2006, Sub Pop)
- Bury Me In My Rings (2011, Vagrant)

=== EPs ===
- Sun, Sun, Sun Bonus EP (2006)

=== Singles ===
- I’ll Be Your Man (2006)
- Babyface (2011)
- Go For the Throat (2011)

=== Compilations ===
- Lagniappe: A Saddle Creek Benefit for Hurricane Katrina (2005, Saddle Creek)
  - Song: "San Francisco via Chicago Blues"

== Videography ==
- "Not Going Home" (2006, directed by Nik Fackler)
- "Go For the Throat" (2011, directed by Noah Dorsey)

== Reviews ==
AbsolutePunk.net Sun, Sun, Sun review
