= Scott Bloom =

American actor and film producer (born 1973)

- Born: Scott Matthew Bloom; July 28, 1973 (age 51); Merrick, New York, U.S.
- Occupations: Actor; film producer
- Years active: 1985–present
- Relatives: Mike Bloom (brother); Brian Bloom (brother)

Scott Matthew Bloom (born July 28, 1973) is an American actor and film producer.

== Early life ==
Bloom was born in Merrick, New York. He is the brother of actor Brian Bloom and musician Mike Bloom.

== Career ==
Bloom began acting in film and television at a young age, starring in the cult horror film The Stuff (1985), and subsequently appeared in numerous TV serials and TV movies including the role of Jesse Nash in the sitcom Who's the Boss? from 1987 to 1988.

Bloom's movie credits as an actor include roles in Don's Plum (2001) with Leonardo DiCaprio and Tobey Maguire, John Q (2002) with Denzel Washington and Robert Duvall, and Smokin' Aces (2006) with Ray Liotta, Ryan Reynolds, and Jeremy Piven.

Partnered with Giovanni Agnelli and Manny Mashouf, Bloom founded the production company Argonaut Pictures in 2007. The company released the film Welcome to the Rileys, starring Kristen Stewart, James Gandolfini, and Melissa Leo in 2010. The project was produced by Ridley Scott and Scott Free Productions, and directed by Jake Scott.
