= Red Faction: Guerrilla =

2009 video game

- North American box art
- Developer: Volition (Note: Ported to Windows by Reactor Zero. The remastered version of the game was developed by Kaiko.)
- Publisher: THQ (Note: The remastered version of the game was published by THQ Nordic.)
- Designers: James Hague; Luke Schneider
- Composers: Timothy Michael Wynn; Jake Kaufman; George Oldziey; Dan Wentz; Raison Varner
- Series: Red Faction
- Platforms: Original; PlayStation 3; Xbox 360; Windows; Re-Mars-tered; PlayStation 4; Windows; Xbox One; Nintendo Switch
- Release: PlayStation 3, Xbox 360: NA: June 2, 2009; AU: June 4, 2009; EU: June 5, 2009; Microsoft Windows: NA: September 15, 2009; AU: September 17, 2009; EU: September 18, 2009; Demons of the Badlands: WW: August 13, 2009; Re-Mars-tered; PlayStation 4, Xbox One, Microsoft Windows: WW: July 3, 2018; Nintendo Switch: WW: July 2, 2019
- Genre: Third-person shooter
- Modes: Single-player, multiplayer

Red Faction: Guerrilla is a 2009 third-person shooter video game developed by Volition and published by THQ. It was released for the PlayStation 3 and Xbox 360 in June 2009 and for Windows in September 2009. The game is the third installment in the Red Faction series. A remastered version titled Red Faction: Guerrilla Re-Mars-tered with improved graphics was released worldwide on July 3, 2018, for the PlayStation 4, Windows and Xbox One, and on July 2, 2019, for the Nintendo Switch.

== Gameplay ==
Red Faction: Guerrilla is a third-person shooter game set in an open world environment. The player takes the role of Alec Mason as he assists the Red Faction to overthrow the oppressive Earth Defense Force (EDF) on Mars. Developer Volition changed the camera perspective to help the player see and appreciate the surroundings as they are destroyed.

Unlike the previous Red Faction game, which used the GeoMod engine, Guerrilla does not allow for the destruction of terrain. However the game's GeoMod 2.0 engine allows for buildings, cover, and other structures to be destroyed. This allows a degree of creativity in approaching a given objective, such as breaking or crashing through structures, or leveling multi-story buildings and large bridges or catwalks to thwart the enemy. In many cases, destroying buildings will leave behind salvage, the game's form of currency, which can be used along with salvage rewarded by completing missions to unlock and upgrade weaponry and technology at safehouses. During the campaign, the player is always equipped with a sledgehammer-styled weapon, along with three slots for other weapons and explosives, selected out of a choice of almost twenty items. The player also has the opportunity to control armed vehicles ranging from retrofitted civilian vehicles to tanks and large walkers for more destructive options against the EDF.

The game's open world represents a terraformed area of Mars' surface. The world is divided into six distinct areas and the player must successfully free each area from EDF control before moving onto the next. As the player travels through as-yet-unfreed areas, they get attacked by EDF forces if they are spotted by patrols or commit aggressive actions. Each area also contains one or more safehouses staffed with Red Faction guerrillas, where the player can re-arm or change their weapon loadout, and spend salvage to purchase upgrades to their weaponry and equipment. The player can traverse the world on foot or by appropriating one of the numerous vehicles. Navigation is provided by a mini-map with a GPS indicator which can be set to direct a player to a location of their choice using a zoomable full-screen map mode. In order to liberate any given area the player must complete a variety of missions to reduce the EDF's presence, referred to as "EDF control". At the same time, the player can complete various side missions, such as rescuing hostages, destroying enemy-held facilities, defending locations from attack, and delivering vehicles. Rewards for tasks come in the form of salvage, reduction of EDF control, or increase in the morale of the populace to resist EDF domination. Other actions, such as letting civilians die, will lower morale, while actively killing civilians will lower morale faster. Should the player engage EDF forces in a sector with high morale, teams of Red Faction guerrillas will likely arrive to fight alongside the player. Once the player has worn down the EDF presence in a sector to zero, a plot mission will become available in which success will drive the EDF out and allow the player to secure the sector. Once this has been completed for a sector it will be freely traversable, with little danger of EDF conflict. Meanwhile, the story of the game progresses along with the liberation of successive sectors.

=== Multiplayer ===
As the players engages in more matches, they gain experience points that grant them bonuses; most of which take the form of superficial bonuses such as the option to add more features to character models or altering aspects of their player emblem, and have no impact on the game. Other bonuses grant players access to additional gameplay modes.

The multiplayer modes also use GeoMod 2.0 and the same weapons available in the game. An added feature exclusive to the multiplayer mode however, are special backpacks that grant players a unique, temporary power. Such powers include the ability to run faster, fly, burst through walls, or send out a concussion wave. Another additional device in the multiplayer games is the Reconstructor, an object that uses nano-technology to rebuild destroyed structures. It is a key device in game modes which require players to attack or defend specific structures. There are six game modes, including typical multiplayer modes such as individual and team Deathmatch and Capture the flag. Other modes focus on attempting to destroy or preventing the destruction of structures. "Siege" for example requires one team to try to destroy buildings controlled by the other as fast as possible. After a set period of time, or once all targets are destroyed, the roles are reversed, and a new round begins. The team that manages to destroy all targets the fastest wins the round.

Along with online multiplayer, there is an offline only "pass the controller" multiplayer game mode for one to four players called "Wrecking Crew". Wrecking Crew features several different modes, all of which are based around causing as much damage by oneself in each round with a set amount of resources.

== Synopsis ==
=== Setting ===
Red Faction: Guerrilla takes place in the year 2125. The Earth Defense Force (EDF), the allies in the original Red Faction, have become the main antagonists of Guerrilla. Although initially supportive of the Martian miners, Earth's natural resources have run scarce, and as a result, its economy has collapsed from rampant speculation of commodities and lack of production. Under pressure by Earth's corporations and leaders to acquire the resources of Mars at any cost and at a pace to meet Earth's high demand, the EDF has forced Martian society into a permanent state of unfree labour. The newly-reformed "Red Faction" arises to revolt against the EDF, drive them off the planet, and begin fairer negotiations with Earth.

=== Plot ===
Protagonist Alec Mason on the surface of Mars. In the first three games of the Red Faction series Mars has been terraformed and can sustain life on its surface.

Alec Mason, a mining engineer, arrives on Mars's Tharsis region to reunite with his brother Dan and begin a new life. While on work detail, Dan testifies about the Earth Defense Force's (EDF) cruelty to the Martian people and asks Alec to join the Red Faction, of which Dan is a member. Dan is soon after gunned down by air support from an EDF assault team. Alec is rescued by Red Faction guerrillas and reluctantly becomes a freedom fighter for the group alongside avid inventor "Sam" Samanya, rambling psychotic Randy Jenkins, and commander Hugo Davies. Between Davies's command and Alec's skill and bravery, the EDF are quickly driven out of the sector known as Parker.

The campaign against the EDF continues in the Dust sector, and Alec is eventually assigned to routine surveillance of the Marauders, a mysterious and violent warrior tribe living in the inhospitable Badlands, in hopes of recovering stolen weapons. Alec tracks them to an abandoned Ultor base that promptly comes under massive assault from the EDF. During the fracas, Alec escapes with a device called the Nano Forge. This brings attention to Admiral Kobel, commander of a powerful warship called the Hydra, along with General Roth, commander of the EDF forces on Mars, who declares Alec an outlaw. Roth turns his attention to Dust and the EDF responds by pulling out of the sector and ordering the artillery base in the Free Fire Zone to bomb Dust into oblivion. Alec is tasked with saving members of the Red Faction and intel on the EDF from the bombardment, which he succeeds in doing.

Alec temporarily loses faith in the movement, citing that no matter how determined their efforts are, the EDF will simply bomb them to submission. However, Sam analyzes the Nano Forge and discovers it can create catastrophic nanites that can disintegrate any object. She builds a prototype rifle from the device and entrusts it to Alec's care.

After determining a series of blind spots in its coverage a successful run against an EDF artillery base commences, allowing the group to begin to take the fight to EDF territories, The Red Faction prepares to launch a massive coordinated offensive against the EDF. However, the EDF stages a spoiling attack against the Red Faction, resulting in the abortion of the offensive, the annihilation of the Badlands camp and the death of Commander Davies. Only Sam, Alec and a handful of other fighters survive the assault. They learn afterward that the Hydra is nearing Mars, with Kobel intending to use its firepower to put an end to the Red Faction and, if necessary, all planetary life. Sam declares that they need support from the Marauders if their campaign is to continue. When Alec remains dubious, she reveals that she was a Marauder herself. The pair head to a Marauder stronghold to meet with their ruler, Vasha, Sam's sister. Sam requests the usage of the Marauders' particle accelerator technology, with plans to combine it with the Nano Forge, creating a weapon capable of destroying the Hydra. Vasha agrees to let the Red Faction use their technology in exchange for possession of the Nano Forge once the war is finished.

After capturing a broadcasting station and using it to regroup the Red Faction, Sam and Alec lead the remaining Red Faction and Marauders on a final assault on EDF Central Command. The two groups converge on Mt. Vogel to assemble the machine, however a surprise EDF blitzkrieg led by General Roth wipes out the Marauders guarding the summit end of the accelerator and Vasha along with them. Alec storms the mountain with a modified missile-pod tank, defeating General Roth's army and killing Roth. Sam's plan succeeds and the accelerated Nano Forge is successful in vaporizing the Hydra. As the survivors of Mars celebrate, Sam declares the war over, but Alec responds that the EDF will return, stating "We'll be ready for 'em". Alec and Sam approach the crowds of civilians gathered, and Alec raises his hammer in the air, showing the sign of the Red Faction and their long-waited victory.

=== Demons of the Badlands ===
Taking place 8 years before the main campaign, Demons of the Badlands has the player assume control of Samanya as she and the marauders drive the EDF out of Mariner Valley. Samanya rescues her sister Vasha before she is publicly executed and assassinates the EDF garrison commander. The sisters clash after Vasha orders all "outsiders" in the valley to be killed, including prisoners in EDF internment camps. Samanya decides to rescue the prisoners before the Marauders' main assault. One of the prisoners she frees is Daniel Mason, who inform her that Hugo Davies is held captive in the EDF headquarters. The pair commandeer a tank, storm the EDF base, rescue Davies and escape in an APC. Once freed, Samanya decides to leave the Marauders and her sister behind.

== Development and marketing ==
Geo-Mod 2.0 technology was used in the game to create dynamically destructible buildings and environments.

In February 2008, it was announced that the third installment of the Red Faction series was coming to multiple platforms. Few details were released at the time of the game's announcement. On July 15, 2008, Rick White, a producer at Volition, debuted a demo at E3 in California (see below). The title was confirmed at the 2008 Game Developers Conference, and in mid-2008, a private multiplayer beta was released on Xbox Live. Among the details revealed at GDC '08 were a new and fully upgraded Geo-Mod system, called "Geo-Mod 2.0". It was also confirmed that the game would take place in an open world environment.

A live demo of the game debuted at E3 2008, with narration by Volition producer Rick White. Many of the game's features were presented during the demo. At the 2008 Penny Arcade Expo, a multiplayer demo was shown. The demo showed off the game mode "Team Anarchy", and "Damage Control", as well as some backpacks that the player can equip for certain powers. In mid-2008, Volition opened a private multiplayer beta to Microsoft to see what needed to be fixed or added. Friends and family codes were sent to survey participants on July 30, 2008. Volition confirmed that IGN had distributed up to 25,000 codes to expand the beta further via paid public membership. Public keys for the Xbox 360 version were released through Fileplanet. The Beta on Xbox Live came to an end on August 29 at 3 am EST.

In February 2008, preview screenshots were leaked to the Internet, causing members at various game forums to come to consider one weapon shown to be an "Ostrich Hammer" based on its shape. Over one year later, on April Fools' Day 2009, Volition released a video commenting on the forum posts, and jokingly implied that the Ostrich Hammer would be a weapon in the game. However, due to the positive response to that video, Volition announced that there would be an Ostrich Hammer weapon present in the game.

On April 23, a single-player demo was released on the Xbox Live Marketplace and the PlayStation Network. A multiplayer demo was released on May 21 for both platforms. The multiplayer demo was removed from the PlayStation Network soon after it was made available due to problems connecting to it. The multiplayer demo was never re-released, and at the time of its removal, there was no official communication from Sony or THQ to let consumers know that it was removed, only comments about the demo's non-functionality.

On September 10, 2008, a Red Faction: Guerrilla Collector's Edition was announced. The collector's edition would have included a 20-inch-tall (510 mm), 7-inch-wide (180 mm), hand painted Walker with pewter handrails, a game art book, and a DVD (Xbox 360 version)/Blu-ray disc (PS3 version). The collector's edition was never released, but various elements that were slated to be included in the collector's edition were made available as pre-order bonuses from specific stores.

A Red Faction: Guerrilla handbook was released by THQ alongside the game's release in the USA. A comic strip made by DC Comics contained within the book featured a prologue to Red Faction: Guerrilla, detailing how Dan Mason came to be a Red Faction member. The comic also follows a mission involving Dan, Samanya and various other Red Faction members, who are fighting against the EDF and encounter a small, orphaned boy who joins the Red Faction, only to later betray them.

After THQ's bankruptcy, the game was acquired by Nordic Games. On November 3, 2014, Nordic Games announced a beta to remove Games For Windows Live and integrate the game into Steamworks.

Games for Windows Live was removed and Steamworks integration was finalized and released through Steam on December 2, 2014, under the name Red Faction: Guerrilla Steam Edition.

=== Downloadable content ===
Red Faction: Guerrilla has three downloadable expansion packs. The first part of these is "Demons Of The Badlands" which is set in a new area named Mariner Valley. Serving as a prequel to the main campaign, the content contains new demolition missions, eight new weapons and three new vehicles. It was released on August 13, 2009. The expansion is included in the Microsoft Windows version of the game.

The second content package, called the "Multiplayer Pack", was released on September 17, 2009, and focuses solely on the online multiplayer game modes. The pack adds two new game modes, "Bagman" and "Team Bagman", based on the game mode from Red Faction II, where the objective is to hold the bag as long as possible, while getting extra points for killing enemies when it is held, and eight new maps. The new maps are restricted to only the Bagman and Team Bagman modes when playing in online matchmaking. The pack is included in the Microsoft Windows version of the game.

The third DLC pack, called the "Smasher Pack", focused on the Wrecking Crew modes. It adds eight new maps which can be used in any previously existing Wrecking Crew mode. It also adds a new Wrecking Crew game mode that requires players to utilize the walker vehicles to cause as much destruction as possible.

=== Re-Mars-tered Edition ===
A remastered version of Guerilla, called the Re-Mars-tered Edition, was released by THQ Nordic on July 3, 2018, for Windows, PlayStation 4 and Xbox One. It includes graphical upgrades, and supports 4K resolutions from the console versions. The remastered version was provided free to those users on Steam that own the original game. The release trailer for the remastered Guerilla game uses the fan-made song "Space Asshole", composed by Chris Remo which had gone viral in the wake of the original game's release. In April 2019, THQ Nordic announced a port of the game for Nintendo Switch, launching on July 2, 2019.

== Soundtrack ==
Red Faction Guerrilla: Official Soundtrack

Soundtrack album by Various artists
- Released: June 29, 2009 (iTunes/Amazon MP3)
- Genre: Soundtrack
- Length: 3:19:32
- Labels: THQ, Inc.

Timothy Michael Wynn composed the cinematic score to Guerrilla's pre-rendered CGI cutscenes, while Jake Kaufman handled the majority of looped micro-scores that play dynamically during "ambient" and "combat" gameplay – material including contributions by Raison Varner and Dan Wentz. George Oldziey and Wentz composed additional music to complement further gameplay scenarios.

A 32-track soundtrack was distributed for sale via the Amazon MP3 service and globally on the iTunes Store on June 29, 2009. However, since the unlicensed re-cycling of the majority of Kaufmann et al.'s compositions in 2011's Red Faction: Battlegrounds, the soundtrack is no longer available for purchase.

The release received positive reception, with Square Enix Music giving the album a 9/10 – praising Wynn's main theme, its fusion of orchestral and futuristic electronic music, as well as the low price for the vast amount of material.

Red Faction Guerrilla: Official Soundtrack
No.	Title	Length
1.	"Main Theme (Defiance)" (Wynn)	2:30
2.	"Prelude" (Wynn)	0:59
3.	"Uprising" (Wynn)	1:44
4.	"End of the Beginning" (Wynn)	1:43
5.	"Hearts and Minds" (Wynn)	1:10
6.	"Children of Stars" (Wynn)	1:10
7.	"The Way to Redemption" (Wynn)	1:52
8.	"Genesis" (Wynn)	1:38
9.	"Uprising Ambience" (Kaufman, Varner, Wentz)	18:51
10.	"Uprising Combat" (Kaufman, Varner, Wentz)	16:55
11.	"Oppression Ambience" (Kaufman, Varner, Wentz)	13:37
12.	"Oppression Combat" (Kaufman, Varner, Wentz)	15:40
13.	"Vindication Ambience" (Kaufman, Varner, Wentz)	13:03
14.	"Vindication Combat" (Kaufman, Varner, Wentz)	15:32
15.	"Subvert" (Kaufman)	5:47
16.	"Mission Evade" (Kaufman, Wentz)	5:56
17.	"Mission Destroy" (Kaufman)	5:58
18.	"Mission Capstone" (Kaufman)	6:19
19.	"Mission Final" (Kaufman)	5:55
20.	"Demolitions Master Activity" (Kaufman)	5:21
21.	"Faction" (Oldziey, Wentz)	5:01
22.	"Accused" (Oldziey, Wentz)	5:11
23.	"Calm" (Oldziey, Wentz)	5:10
24.	"Storm" (Oldziey, Wentz)	4:53
25.	"Condemnation" (Oldziey, Wentz)	5:12
26.	"Grinder" (Oldziey, Wentz)	4:57
27.	"Hunter" (Oldziey, Wentz)	4:54
28.	"Lamb To Slaughter" (Oldziey, Wentz)	5:19
29.	"Poltergeist" (Oldziey, Wentz)	5:00
30.	"Synergy" (Oldziey, Wentz)	5:09
31.	"Two Ton Heavy Thing" (Oldziey, Wentz)	5:02
32.	"Bar Radio Loop Sketches" (Kaufman)	2:04
Total length:		3:19:32

== Reception ==
=== Red Faction: Guerrilla ===
Red Faction: Guerrilla

Aggregate score
Aggregator	Score		
Aggregator	PC	PS3	Xbox 360
Metacritic	82/100	85/100	85/100

Review scores
Publication	Score		
Publication	PC	PS3	Xbox 360
Destructoid	N/A	N/A	8.5/10
Edge	N/A	7/10	7/10
Eurogamer	N/A	N/A	7/10
Game Informer	N/A	9/10	9/10
GamePro	5/5	5/5	5/5
GameSpot	8.5/10	8.5/10	8.5/10
GameSpy	N/A	4.5/5	4.5/5
GameTrailers	N/A	N/A	7.9/10
GameZone	N/A	8.2/10	8/10
Giant Bomb	N/A	4/5	4/5
IGN	8/10	8/10	8/10
Official Xbox Magazine (US)	N/A	N/A	7/10
PC Gamer (UK)	88%	N/A	N/A
PlayStation: The Official Magazine	N/A	3.5/5	N/A
The Daily Telegraph	N/A	7/10	7/10

Red Faction: Guerrilla received "generally favorable" reviews from critics on all platforms according to the review aggregator Metacritic. On July 28, 2009, at the Q1 earnings conference call, THQ Director Brian Farrell confirmed that Red Faction: Guerrilla had then sold more than 1 million units.

The game received some criticism for its "weak story". GameSpot reviewer Randolph Ramsey praised the physics and realism of the game but also criticized its repetitiveness and plotline. GameTrailers criticized the Xbox 360 version's pace, environment, and difficulty particularly in the later missions: "you'll be lucky to get out of the most heated battles alive. Often to its detriment, Guerrilla imparts the desperate feeling of being one man struggling to rip apart an army at its foundations. ... Maybe the point was to make you feel like a fragile, puny man staring Goliath in the maw. In any case, don't feel ashamed if you have to tune the difficulty down for a particularly brutal mission." IGN reviewer Charles Onyett cited the fun gameplay, but said that the storyline, graphics, and voice acting were weak. 1UP.com reviewer Justin Haywald noted the weak storyline but lauded the "degree to which you can destroy environments". In Japan, where the game was ported and published by Spike for the PlayStation 3 and Xbox 360 versions on August 6, 2009, and by E-Frontier for the PC version on Christmas Day 2009, Famitsu gave the former two versions a score of all four nines for a total of 36 out of 40.

During the 13th Annual Interactive Achievement Awards, the Academy of Interactive Arts & Sciences nominated Red Faction: Guerrilla for "Action Game of the Year".

After THQ cancelled the Red Faction franchise in 2011, in response to the high-profile disappointment Red Faction: Armageddon leading to a $38.4M loss for the company, GamesRadar called Guerrilla "the one time the series made good on its promises in any meaningful way". Several years after release, Destructoid listed the game as one of THQ's ten best.

=== Demons of the Badlands ===
Red Faction: Guerrilla – Demons of the Badlands

Aggregate score
Aggregator	Score	
Aggregator	PS3	Xbox 360
Metacritic	61/100	66/100

Review scores
Publication	Score	
Publication	PS3	Xbox 360
Eurogamer	N/A	7/10
GamesMaster	N/A	65%
GameSpot	7/10	7/10
Play	60%	N/A

The Demons of the Badlands expansion pack received "mixed or average" reviews from critics on both platforms according to Metacritic.

=== Re-Mars-tered ===
Red Faction: Guerrilla Re-Mars-tered

Aggregate score
Aggregator	Score			
Aggregator	NS	PC	PS4	Xbox One
Metacritic	73/100	67/100	70/100	73/100

The 2018 remastered edition received "mixed or average" reviews on all four platforms according to Metacritic. In his review for the PS4 edition of the game, Destructoid writer Peter Glagowski cited the poor performance of the port as one of his major gripes, noting issues with framerate and input lag, in addition to several system crashes, stating "...it took me quite a few entire system restarts to make it through the campaign mode".

== Sequel ==
Red Faction: Armageddon, a sequel to Guerrilla that follows the events on Mars many decades later via Alec Mason's grandson Darius, was released for major video game platforms on June 7, 2011.
