= Bury Me in My Rings =

Studio album by The Elected
- Released: 17 May 2011
- Genre: Indie rock
- Label: Vagrant
- Producer: Blake Sennett

The Elected chronology
| Sun, Sun, Sun (2006) | Bury Me in My Rings (2011) |

Professional ratings
Aggregate scores
| Source | Rating |
|---|---|
| Metacritic | 71/100 link |
Review scores
| Source | Rating |
| Slant Magazine | link |
| Pitchfork Media | (6.0/10) link |

Bury Me in My Rings is the third and final album by indie band The Elected which was released on 17 May 2011 by Vagrant Records. It is described as "complete with twelve shimmering pop songs reminiscent of mid-century West Coast rock." A first single, "Babyface," was exclusively released on Spin.com on 2 March 2011.

== Track listing ==
1. "Born to Love You"
2. "Babyface"
3. "Look at Me Now"
4. "Jailbird"
5. "Go for the Throat"
6. "This Will Be Worth It"
7. "Trip Round the World"
8. "When I’m Gone"
9. "Who Are You"
10. "Have You Been Cheated"
11. "See the Light"
12. "Time is Coming"
13. "Some People" (Bonus Track)
