= Red Faction: Battlegrounds =

2011 video game

- Developer: THQ Digital Studios UK
- Publisher: THQ
- Series: Red Faction
- Platforms: PlayStation 3 (PlayStation Network), Xbox 360 (Xbox Live Arcade)
- Release: NA: April 5, 2011 (PS3); WW: April 6, 2011
- Genres: Vehicle simulation (combat), multi-directional shooter
- Modes: Single-player, multiplayer

Red Faction: Battlegrounds is a vehicle simulation multi-directional shooter developed and published by THQ for PlayStation 3 (via PlayStation Network) and Xbox 360 (via Xbox Live Arcade) in 2011. It was released for the promotion of Red Faction: Armageddon.

== Reception ==
Reception

Aggregate score
Aggregator	Score	
Aggregator	PS3	Xbox 360
Metacritic	49/100	52/100

Review scores
Publication	Score	
Publication	PS3	Xbox 360
Eurogamer	N/A	5/10
GamePro	3.5/5	3.5/5
GameSpot	5/10	N/A
GameTrailers	N/A	5.6/10
GameZone	N/A	5/10
IGN	5/10	5/10
Joystiq	N/A	2/5
PlayStation Official Magazine – UK	5/10	N/A
Official Xbox Magazine (US)	N/A	8/10
Push Square	5/10	N/A
Metro	N/A	4/10

The Xbox 360 version received "mixed" reviews, while the PlayStation 3 version received "generally unfavorable reviews", according to the review aggregation website Metacritic.
