= Me First (album) =

Studio album by The Elected
- Released: February 3, 2004
- Genre: Indie rock
- Length: 46:40
- Label: Sub Pop

The Elected chronology
Me First (2004)	Sun, Sun, Sun (2006)

Professional ratings
Aggregate scores
Source	Rating
Metacritic	80/100
Review scores
Source	Rating
AllMusic	3/5 stars
Alternative Press	5/5 stars
Blender	3.5/5 stars
Entertainment Weekly	B
Now	4/5 stars
Pitchfork	8.0/10
Spin	B+
Stylus	B
Tiny Mix Tapes	2.5/5 stars
Uncut	7/10

Me First is the debut album by indie band The Elected, released in 2004 via Sub Pop. It is a mix between indie and country.

== Track listing ==
All songs written by Blake Sennett, except where noted.

1. "7 September 2003" – 3:56
2. "Greetings in Braille" – 3:58
3. "My Baby's a Dick" – 3:31
4. "A Time for Emily" – 2:23
5. "Don't Get Your Hopes Up" – 3:30
6. "Waves (The Time That You're Awake)" (Sennett, Blake Klugman) – 3:35
7. "The Miles 'Til Home" – 5:10
8. "Go On" – 5:17
9. "C'mon, Mom" – 4:35
10. "A Response to Greed" – 3:56
11. "Don't Blow It" – 4:10
12. "British Columbia" – 2:36
