= Mt. Egypt =

American singer-songwriter

Mt. Egypt was the moniker for Travis Graves, an American singer-songwriter from Virginia. In 2002, skateboarding friend Jason Dill connected Graves to the label Record Collection. The following year, Mt. Egypt released his debut album, Battening the Hatches.

In 2006, Mt. Egypt toured his second album, Perspectives (2005), with Band of Horses; he has also toured with The Flaming Lips and Willie Nelson.

His final album III was released in 2009 in a limited print of 100 vinyl LPs, available in California record stores Amoeba Records and Aquarius Records (store), as well as other selected outlets.

Graves died 29th of August 2023.

== Discography ==
- Battening the Hatches (Record Collection, 2003)
- Perspectives (Record Collection, 2005)
- III (Secret Seven, 2009)
