= Red Faction: Armageddon =

2011 video game

- Developer: Volition
- Publishers: THQ; Syfy Games
- Designer: David Abzug
- Composer: Brian Reitzell
- Series: Red Faction
- Platforms: Microsoft Windows; PlayStation 3; Xbox 360
- Release: NA: June 7, 2011; AU: June 8, 2011; EU: June 10, 2011
- Genre: Third-person shooter
- Modes: Single-player, multiplayer

Red Faction: Armageddon is a 2011 third-person shooter video game developed by Volition and published by THQ in association with the TV network Syfy. It is the fourth and final installment in the Red Faction series, and was released for Microsoft Windows, PlayStation 3 and Xbox 360 in June 2011.

Critics liked the new weaponry, but were puzzled at the change from an open world game to a linear shooter and that it abandoned the strong points of its predecessor. Poor sales resulted in THQ's decision to stop releasing games in the Red Faction franchise and negatively impacted their financial quarter. The rights to the series were owned by THQ Nordic, yet they would later be transferred to its sister company Koch Media, which would place it under its Deep Silver label in 2020.

== Gameplay ==
Like its predecessor Red Faction: Guerrilla, Red Faction: Armageddon is a third-person shooter. The player takes on the role of Darius Mason, a descendant of Guerrilla's Alec Mason. The game is set 50 years after the conclusion of Guerrilla. Most of the game is set in a tunnel complex inhabited by alien creatures.

As in previous games in the franchise, landscape destruction is possible through the "Geo-Mod" feature. In this game, the player can use a device called a Nano Forge to repair structures such as stairs, allowing them to progress through the caves. Audio logs can be found throughout the complex. When played they provide elements of backstory. Various vehicles can be used including a mine cart and a barge. The player can also use mech suits at some points in the game.

== Synopsis ==
=== Setting ===
One of the new areas of the game is underground, in the abandoned Ultor mining complex, with sinister beasts among the antagonists.

The game takes place on the planet Mars. It is set in the year 2175, 50 years after the events of Red Faction: Guerrilla. Since the liberation of Mars, the surface of the planet has become uninhabitable. This occurred when the massive Terraformer machine on Mars which supplied it with its Earth-like atmosphere was destroyed by Adam Hale, the game's key antagonist, causing super-tornados and violent lightning storms to engulf the planet. In order to survive, the Colonists were forced to flee to the underground mines of Mars built by their ancestors, creating a network of habitable caves under the surface of the planet and setting up colonies there.

The game begins 5 years after the relocation to the mines in 2175, and follows Darius Mason, grandson of Martian Revolution heroes Alec Mason and Samanya, the main characters of Red Faction: Guerrilla, who runs a lucrative series of businesses based in Bastion, the underground hub of Colonist activity, including mining, scavenging and mercenary work. Few sane people venture to the ravaged surface of Mars, apart from contractors like Darius and smugglers who transport goods between settlements. Darius is tricked into reopening a mysterious, vast shaft in an old Marauder temple by a fanatical Marauder priest, which awakens a long-dormant race of Martian creatures, causing an Armageddon on Mars. Colonist and Marauder settlements alike are torn apart by the new enemies, and the blame for the whole disaster is placed on Darius, soon inciting several angry colonists to form mobs and attack him in their fury. Now Darius must join the Red Faction to clear his name and save the people of Mars, as his grandfather did before him.

=== Plot ===
Cultists, a splinter faction of the Marauders and EDF led by Adam Hale, capture a terraformer controlling Mars' weather; Darius Mason and Red Faction forces led by Frank Winters attempt to retake it. Unfortunately, Hale, disguised as a Red Faction soldier, tricks Darius and destroys the terraformer, resulting in catastrophic weather that forces the entire population underground.

A few years later, Darius is a freelance miner along with a Marauder friend named Kara in the town of Bastion. An archeological group led by Kite hires Darius for an excavation job; Kara tells him not to go due to an incoming major storm and a bad feeling, giving him a Benjamin Franklin medallion for luck and to "ward off lightning strikes." At the job site, Darius becomes trapped in the tunnels; his employers, Hale and the Cultists in disguise, deceive him into opening a seal, releasing a violent alien race called the Plague. Left unconscious for three days, Darius, guided by SAM (Situation Awareness Module), escapes the tunnels into an underground mining colony under attack by the Plague. Grouping up with survivors and some Red Faction soldiers, he escorts an ambulance convoy to Bastion with the help of a L.E.O. exosuit. However, Bastion is already overrun, so Darius tries to help the injured holed up in the center of town. However, the colonists turn against him upon learning he was involved in releasing the Plague, and are massacred while Darius escapes to the surface, where Frank and the Red Faction arrest him. However, the soldiers accept his help in fending off an attack.

Frank reveals the Cultists' hiding place, which Darius and Kara assault using a Marauder walker, discovering Hale trying to tame the Plague. Darius fails to kill Hale and flees in a minecart with Hale in pursuit. A landslide cripples Hale's machine, allowing Darius to use his Magnet Gun to finish Hale by dropping pieces of the ceiling, decapitating him. He and Kara then escape to a Marauder city, where they hope to learn more about the Plague. They discover a secret, lava-filled, inaccessible entrance, so Darius and Frank take a barge to destroy a machine raising the lava. Darius and Kara then confront the alien Queen, sharing a kiss before Kara is killed while they try to repair their vehicle. Enraged at losing Kara, Darius nearly overpowers the Queen, who flees to the surface to take over Mars.

SAM discovers that the Plague cannot withstand an Earth-like atmosphere, so Darius plans to use the nano forge to repair the terraformer. With time of the essence, Darius latches onto one of the Queen's tentacles during her ascension; battling his way into the terraformer, he repairs it, killing off the Plague before Red Faction and Marauder forces arrive to secure the area. As clouds dissipate after years of dust storms, SAM warns Darius of high concentrations of radiation entering the atmosphere, to which he replies, "Easy there, genius: that's the sun," pulling out the Franklin medallion and staring at it.

== Development and release ==
The game was announced in the form of a short teaser trailer on June 4, 2010, on GameTrailers TV. The game was also showcased at the E3 2010 from June 15 to 17, 2010. During Comic-Con in San Diego, 2010, a promotional comic book titled Red Faction: Armageddon #0 was presented as a free giveaway. A downloadable vehicle-based multiplayer game called Red Faction: Battlegrounds was released in April 2011.

Additionally, the Syfy network produced a direct-to-television film that bridges the story gap between Guerrilla and Armageddon, titled Red Faction: Origins. It was released in June 2011. A playable demo for the game was announced in April, and was released on May 3, 2011, for the Xbox 360. The playable demo for PlayStation 3 was released on June 2, 2011. A playable demo of the Windows version was released exclusively through the OnLive service.

To promote Red Faction: Armageddon, THQ released Red Faction: Battlegrounds, a multi-directional shooter in April 2011. The game was developed by THQ Digital Warrington and released on Xbox Live Arcade and PlayStation Network. Red Faction: Battlegrounds is a top-down twin-stick vehicle-based shooter with gameplay similar to a demolition derby.

=== Downloadable content ===
An expansion subtitled Path to War was released worldwide on August 3, 2011.

== Reception ==
=== Critical reception ===
Red Faction: Armageddon

Aggregate score
Aggregator	Score		
Aggregator	PC	PS3	Xbox 360
Metacritic	75/100	71/100	71/100

Review scores
Publication	Score		
Publication	PC	PS3	Xbox 360
Destructoid	N/A	N/A	7/10
Eurogamer	N/A	N/A	7/10
Game Informer	N/A	7.25/10	7.25/10
GameRevolution	N/A	B+	B+
GameSpot	N/A	8/10	8/10
GameSpy	N/A	2.5/5	2.5/5
GameTrailers	N/A	N/A	7.8/10
Giant Bomb	N/A	3/5	3/5
IGN	7/10	7/10	7/10
Joystiq	N/A	N/A	2.5/5
Official Xbox Magazine (US)	N/A	N/A	8.5/10
PC Gamer (US)	84%	N/A	N/A
PlayStation: The Official Magazine	N/A	7/10	N/A
PSM3	N/A	55%	N/A
Digital Spy	N/A	N/A	3/5
The Escapist	N/A	N/A	3/5

The PlayStation 3 and Xbox 360 versions of Red Faction: Armageddon received "mixed or average" reviews, while the Windows version received "generally favorable" reviews, according to the review aggregator platform Metacritic.

According to GameSpot, "Red Faction: Armageddon returns to the linear roots of the series with great success. Thanks to an enjoyably powerful arsenal and remarkably thorough destructibility, tearing your way through this alien-annihilating adventure is very gratifying... and the arrival of the magnet gun should be celebrated by anyone with a hankering for havoc. It's one of the most powerful, inspiring, and downright hilarious gameplay mechanics to come along in a while, and it makes Red Faction: Armageddon immensely appealing." GameSpy said that "The main campaign has gone from an open-ended, Grand Theft Auto-style game to a strictly linear, close-quarters, and poorly plotted mess" and also describes the 'ruin mode' as "...incredibly fun in short bursts, but without any overarching goals or real sense of rewards, it's really more of a time-waster than an honest-to-goodness game in its own right." However, it did praise the new weapons available, saying, "you get some pretty nifty gear with which to do said dealing."

IGN wrote, "Despite its forgettable story and pacing issues with the campaign, Red Faction: Armageddon is good fun for letting out your inner destructive child." GameZone's Mike Splechta gave the Xbox 360 version 8.5 out of 10 and said, "I wasn't sure whether I would like the game's change from Guerrilla's open world formula to a more linear mission-based one. However, this wasn't the case. The storyline is gripping, if at times a bit cliché; the controls are spot on; and leveling all that's around you never gets old. Red Faction: Armageddon is simply a blast to play through." GamePro gave it and the PS3 version three-and-a-half stars out of five and said, "Armageddon's not bad, it's just plain. The game feels like Volition started from scratch, but accidentally threw out too much of what made the last game great." Joystiq said of the Xbox 360 version: "In Red Faction: Armageddon, developer Volition has run from everything that made Red Faction: Guerrilla great, and is left with a drab, heartless lump of competence for its efforts." MTV's Russ Frushtick concluded "Volition has transformed Red Faction back into a mindless, forgettable shooter. Here's hoping they right the ship for the next release." In Japan, where the PS3 and Xbox 360 versions were ported and published by Spike on June 9, 2011, Famitsu gave both console versions each a score of two nines and two eights for a total of 34 out of 40.

Digital Spy gave it three stars out of five and said that the series has taken "one small step forward, but not quite the giant leap that was needed." The Escapist also gave it three stars out of five and called it "a polished and satisfying reflex shooter that removes meaningful decisions from the game and trivializes its own greatest technology." Edge gave it a score of six out of ten and said, "Once again, Volition delivers exceptional tech, but fails to shape it into a truly engaging and sustaining experience." However, The A.V. Club gave it a C and said, "Everything Armageddon does, it does well, in the same way that a lobotomy victim might walk and talk just fine." Metro gave the PS3 version a score of four out of ten and called it a "Backwards sequel that sabotages or removes all the best features from the last game and wastes one of the best arsenals in gaming."

=== Path to War ===
Red Faction: Armageddon – Path to War

Aggregate score
Aggregator	Score	
Aggregator	PS3	Xbox 360
Metacritic	64/100	58/100

Review scores
Publication	Score	
Publication	PS3	Xbox 360
GameSpot	N/A	5.5/10
Official Xbox Magazine (US)	N/A	5/10
PSM3	64%	N/A

The PS3 and Xbox 360 versions of the Path to War DLC received "mixed" reviews according to Metacritic.

=== Sales ===
The sales of Red Faction: Armageddon were poor and the game was considered a commercial failure by THQ. Because of this, on June 27, 2011, THQ announced that plans for future installments had been cancelled. The disappointing sales of Armageddon, along with other factors, had led THQ to lose $38.4 million in a fiscal year. While no actual sales figures are revealed, after THQ declared bankruptcy in December 2012, developer Volition, which was purchased by Deep Silver in an auction, revealed that the development of both Red Faction: Guerrilla and Red Faction: Armageddon had "lost quite a bit" of money for THQ.
