= Sun, Sun, Sun =

Studio album by The Elected
- Released: January 24, 2006
- Genre: Indie rock
- Length: 47:52
- Label: Sub Pop

The Elected chronology
Me First (2004)	Sun, Sun, Sun (2006)	Bury Me in My Rings (2011)

Professional ratings
Aggregate scores
Source	Rating
Metacritic	63/100
Review scores
Source	Rating
AllMusic	3.5/5 stars
Pitchfork Media	6.8/10
PopMatters	5/10 stars
Rolling Stone	3/5 stars

Sun, Sun, Sun is the second album by indie band The Elected, released in 2006 by Sub Pop.

== Track listing ==
1. "Clouds Parting (8:14 a.m.)" (Blake Sennett) – 0:44
2. "Would You Come with Me" (Sennett) – 2:50
3. "Fireflies in a Steel Mill" (Sennett, Jenny Lewis, Sienna McCandless) – 4:02
4. "Not Going Home" (Sennett, Mike Bloom) – 4:45
5. "It Was Love" (Sennett) – 3:35
6. "Sun, Sun, Sun" (Sennett) – 3:14
7. "Did Me Good" (Sennett) – 4:10
8. "The Bank and Trust" (Sennett, Lewis) – 3:16
9. "Old Times" (Sennett, Bloom) – 3:43
10. "Desiree" (Sennett, Morgan Nagler, Michael Runion) – 2:52
11. "I'll Be Your Man" (Sennett) – 4:23
12. "Beautiful Rainbow" (Sennett) – 2:17
13. "Biggest Star" (Sennett, Brian Klugman) – 7:17
14. "At Home (Time Unknown)" (Sennett) – 0:41

=== Bonus disc ===
1. "Not Me" – 2:53
2. "I Don't Care" – 4:50
3. "For You" – 3:13
