= List of iOS games =

This is a list of notable games and applications available or in development for iOS, the operating system of the iPhone, iPod touch, and iPad.

There are currently 340 games on this list.

== Games and applications ==
Title	Developer(s)	Publisher(s)	Genre	Release date	Lite version	Ref.
1-Bit Ninja	Kode80	Kode80	Platformer	June 23, 2011		
9 Elefants	Microids	Anuman	Puzzle	April 24, 2014		
Ace Racer	NetEase Games	NetEase Games	Racing	CHN: July 23, 2021; WW: March 16, 2023		
Aglet	onlife Inc.	onlife Inc.	Location-based	April 11, 2020		
Animal Crossing: Pocket Camp	NDcube; Nintendo EPD	Nintendo	Social simulation	AU: October 25, 2017; WW: November 21, 2017		
Angry Birds	Rovio	Chillingo	Puzzle	December 11, 2009	✔	
Ant Raid	Prank	Prank	Real-time strategy	July 6, 2011		
Among Us	Innersloth	Innersloth	Social deduction	June 15, 2018		
Apocalypse Max: Better Dead Than Undead	Wandake	Wandake	Platform shooter	September 14, 2012		
Apollo Justice: Ace Attorney	Capcom	Capcom	Adventure, visual novel	December 1, 2016		
Async Corp.	Powerhead Games	Powerhead Games	Puzzle	June 28, 2011		
Banzai Rabbit	Revolutionary Concepts	Revolutionary Concepts	Arcade	June 9, 2010		
Battle Academy	Slitherine Software	Slitherine Software	Turn-based strategy	March 14, 2012		
Battle Academy 2: Eastern Front	Slitherine Software	Slitherine Software	Turn-based strategy	October 23, 2014		
Battle Worlds: Kronos	King Art Games	Nordic Games	Turn-based strategy	November 10, 2014		
Beast Boxing 3D	Goodhustle Studios	Goodhustle Studios	Sports	October 28, 2010		
Bit City	NimbleBit	NimbleBit	City-building, clicker	March 14, 2017		
Bit Pilot	Zach Gage	Zach Gage	Bullet hell, action	March 4, 2010		
Blast-A-Way	Illusion Labs	Illusion Labs	Puzzle	August 30, 2012		
Bleach: Brave Souls	KLab Games	KLab Games	Social network	JP: July 23, 2015; NA: January 13, 2016		
Boulder Dash-XL	HeroCraft	First Star Software	Puzzle	November 20, 2012		
Brawl Stars	Supercell	Supercell	Third-person shooter	December 12, 2018		
Bring me Sandwiches!!	Grumpyface Studios	Adult Swim Games	Puzzle-platformer	October 20, 2011		
Broken Age	Double Fine Productions	Double Fine Productions	Adventure	April 28, 2015		
Broken Sword: Shadow of the Templars – The Director's Cut	Revolution Software	Revolution Software	Adventure	May 26, 2010		
Broken Sword: The Smoking Mirror - Remastered	Revolution Software	Revolution Software	Adventure	December 16, 2010		
Broken Sword 5: The Serpent's Curse	Revolution Software	Revolution Software	Adventure	February 6, 2014		
Bug Heroes	Foursaken Media	Foursaken Media	Adventure	January 6, 2011		
Bully: Anniversary Edition	Rockstar Vancouver	Rockstar Games	Action-adventure	December 8, 2016		
Cat Bird	Raiyumi	Raiyumi	Puzzle-platformer	August 23, 2017		
The Creeps!	Super Squawk Software	Super Squawk Software	Tower defense	December 23, 2008		
Choro 2021	Carl Zitelmann	Carl Zitelmann	Action, adventure	December 5, 2021		
Cover Orange	FDG Entertainment	FDG Entertainment	Puzzle	November 16, 2010		
Covet Fashion	Crowdtap	Crowdtap	Dress up	November 12, 2013		
Crash Club	Prettygreat	Prettygreat	Massively multiplayer online	May 10, 2017		
Crazy Hedgy	Cybertime	Cybertime	3D platformer, beat 'em up	December 10, 2011		
Cube Escape Collection	Rusty Lake	Rusty Lake	Puzzle	October 14, 2020		
Dark Nebula	1337 Game Design	1337 Game Design	Action	August 2009		
Darklings	MildMania	MildMania	Puzzle-platformer	November 2013		
Desert Fox: The Battle of El Alamein	Shenandoah Studio	Shenandoah Studio	Turn-based strategy	June 16, 2014		
DigiDrummer	Magnick Software	Magnick Software	Music	September 26, 2008		
Diggin' Dogs	Soap Creative	Chillingo	Puzzle	February 9, 2012		
Dissidia Final Fantasy: Opera Omnia	Square Enix	Square Enix	Endless runner	March 6, 2013		
Does Not Commute	Mediocre	Mediocre	Puzzle, strategy	April 23, 2015		
Dogfight 1951	Treehouse Ltd	Treehouse Ltd	Combat flight simulation	July 28, 2010		
Dr. Mario World	Nintendo; Line Corporation; NHN Entertainment	Nintendo	Puzzle	July 9, 2019		
Dragalia Lost	Cygames	Nintendo	Action role-playing	September 26, 2018		
Dream of Pixels	Dawn of Play	Dawn of Play	Puzzle	November 15, 2012		
EA Sports UFC	EA Canada	EA Sports	Sports, fighting	April 21, 2015		
The Elder Scrolls: Legends	Dire Wolf Digital	Bethesda Softworks	Collectible card	March 23, 2017		
Elder Sign: Omens	Fantasy Flight Games	Fantasy Flight Games	Adventure, board game	October 31, 2011		
The Exit 8	Kotake Create	Playism	Adventure	March 28, 2025		
Fire Emblem Heroes	Intelligent Systems	Nintendo	Tactical role-playing	February 2, 2017		
Fortnite Battle Royale	Epic Games	Epic Games	Battle royale	April 2, 2018		
Futurama: Worlds of Tomorrow	TinyCo	Jam City	City building, adventure	March 3, 2017		
Game Dev Story	Kairosoft	Kairosoft	Simulation	October 9, 2010	✔	
Game of Thrones: A Telltale Games Series	Telltale Games	Telltale Games	Adventure	December 4, 2014		
Game of War: Fire Age	Machine Zone	Machine Zone	MMO, strategy	July 25, 2013		
GamePigeon	Vitalii Zlotskii	Vitalii Zlotskii	Party	September 13, 2016		
Gem Keeper	NCSoft	NCSoft	Tower defense	October 14, 2011		
Gems with Friends	Zynga with Friends	Zynga	Tile-matching	September 6, 2012	✔	
Geometry Dash	RobTop Games	RobTop Games	Arcade	August 13, 2013	✔	
Goat Simulator	Coffee Stain Studios	Coffee Stain Studios	Action	September 16, 2014		
Golfinity	NimbleBit	NimbleBit	Sports	November 12, 2014		
Good Pizza, Great Pizza	TapBlaze	TapBlaze	Management	December 2, 2014		
Grand Theft Auto III	Rockstar North	Rockstar Games	Action-adventure	December 15, 2011		
Grand Theft Auto: Chinatown Wars	Rockstar Leeds; Rockstar North	Rockstar Games	Action-adventure	January 17, 2010		
Grand Theft Auto: Liberty City Stories	Rockstar Leeds; Rockstar North	Rockstar Games	Action-adventure	December 17, 2015		
Grand Theft Auto: San Andreas	Rockstar North	Rockstar Games	Action-adventure	December 12, 2013		
Grand Theft Auto: The Trilogy - The Definitive Edition	Grove Street Games	Rockstar Games	Action-adventure	December 14, 2023		
Grand Theft Auto: Vice City	Rockstar North	Rockstar Games	Action-adventure	December 6, 2012		
Growtopia	Ubisoft Abu Dhabi; Robinson Technologies; Hamumu Software	Ubisoft	MMO	November 30, 2012		
Hank Hazard	Chillingo	Chillingo	Puzzle	December 22, 2011		
Hay Day	Supercell	Supercell	Simulation	June 21, 2012		
Hearthstone	Blizzard Entertainment	Blizzard Entertainment	Card battle	April 14, 2015		
Hector: Badge of Carnage	Telltale Games	Telltale Games	Adventure	June 2, 2010		
Hello Neighbor	Dynamic Pixels	tinyBuild	Survival horror	July 27, 2018		
Hitman Go	Square Enix Montreal	Square Enix	Puzzle	April 17, 2014		
Human Resource Machine	Tomorrow Corporation	Tomorrow Corporation	Puzzle	June 1, 2016		
Hunters: Episode One	Rodeo Games	Rodeo Games	Tactical role-playing	February 26, 2011		
Hunters 2	Rodeo Games	Rodeo Games	Tactical role-playing	March 22, 2012		
Inazuma Eleven: Victory Road	Level-5	Level-5	Role-playing	November 13, 2025		
Incidence	ScrollView Games	ScrollView Games	Sports	March 1, 2017		
Infinity Blade	Chair Entertainment	Epic Games	Fighting	December 9, 2010		
Infinity Blade II	Chair Entertainment	Epic Games	Fighting	December 1, 2011		
Infinity Blade III	Chair Entertainment	Epic Games	Fighting	September 18, 2013		
Infinity Field	ForzeField Studios	Chillingo	Shooter	January 27, 2011		
Injustice: Gods Among Us	NetherRealm Studios	Warner Bros. Interactive Entertainment	Fighting	April 3, 2013		
Injustice 2	NetherRealm Studios	Warner Bros. Interactive Entertainment	Fighting	May 16, 2017		
Inkvaders	Chillingo	Chillingo	Casual	August 20, 2009		
Inside	Playdead	Playdead	Platformer	December 15, 2017		
Jetpack Joyride	Halfbrick Studios	Halfbrick Studios	Endless runner	September 1, 2011		
Joe Danger Infinity	Hello Games	Hello Games	Endless runner	January 9, 2014		
The Journey Down - Chapter One: Over the Edge	Skygoblin	Skygoblin	Adventure	May 20, 2012		
The Journey Down - Chapter Two: Into the Mist	Skygoblin	Skygoblin	Adventure	August 28, 2014		
Kamicrazy	Fluid Pixel	Fluid Pixel	Puzzle, platformer	December 12, 2008		
Kathy Rain	Clifftop Games	Raw Fury	Adventure	November 23, 2016		
Kazooloo	Unlimited Reality	Unlimited Reality	Action	April 4, 2014		
Kitten Sanctuary	Clockwork Pixels		Puzzle	27 March 2012		
Kim Kardashian: Hollywood	Glu Mobile	Glu Mobile	Adventure	June 21, 2014		
Kingdom Hearts Unchained χ	Square Enix	Square Enix	Role-playing	JP: September 3, 2015; NA: April 7, 2016; PAL: June 16, 2016		
Layton's Mystery Journey	Level-5	Level-5	Puzzle, adventure	July 20, 2017		
Law & Order: Legacies	Telltale Games	Telltale Games	Adventure	December 22, 2011		
Letterpress	Atebits	Atebits	Word, turn-based	October 24, 2012		
Light the Flower	Tribeflame	Chillingo	Puzzle	March 22, 2012		
Limbo	Playdead	Playdead	Puzzle, platformer	July 3, 2013		
Lineage 2 Revolution	Netmarble	Netmarble	Massively multiplayer online role-playing	November 15, 2017		
Little Inferno	Tomorrow Corporation	Experimental Gameplay Group	Puzzle	January 30, 2013		
Little Tail Story	CyberConnect2	Namco Bandai	Role-playing	March 25, 2014		
Love Plus Every	Sega	Sega	Dating sim	October 31, 2019		
Lunar: Silver Star Story Touch	Game Arts	SoMoGa, Inc.	Role-playing	September 20, 2012		
Marvel: Future Fight	Netmarble Games	Netmarble Games	Role-playing	April 30, 2015		
Mario Kart Tour	Nintendo	Nintendo	Racing	September 25, 2019		
Max Payne Mobile	Remedy Entertainment	Rockstar Games	Third-person shooter	April 12, 2012		
Mega Man 2	Beeline Interactive	Capcom	Platformer	March 26, 2009	✔	
Mega Man Mobile	Capcom	Capcom	Platformer	JP: January 5, 2017; NA: January 6, 2017		
Mega Man Mobile 2	Capcom	Capcom	Platformer	JP: January 5, 2017; NA: January 6, 2017		
Mega Man Mobile 3	Capcom	Capcom	Platformer	JP: January 5, 2017; NA: January 6, 2017		
Mega Man Mobile 4	Capcom	Capcom	Platformer	JP: January 5, 2017; NA: January 6, 2017		
Mega Man Mobile 5	Capcom	Capcom	Platformer	JP: January 5, 2017; NA: January 6, 2017		
Mega Man Mobile 6	Capcom	Capcom	Platformer	JP: January 5, 2017; NA: January 6, 2017		
Mega Man X	Beeline Interactive	Capcom	Platformer	December 3, 2011		
Mega Run	Get Set Games	Get Set Games	Platformer	May 29, 2012		
Merge Magic!	Gram Games	Gram Games	Puzzle adventure	September 18, 2019		
Metal Slug	SNK Playmore	SNK Playmore	Run and gun	December 13, 2012		
Metal Slug 2	SNK Playmore	SNK Playmore	Run and gun	February 7, 2013		
Metal Slug 3	SNK Playmore	SNK Playmore	Run and gun	July 12, 2012		
Metal Slug Defense	SNK Playmore	SNK Playmore	Tower defense	May 1, 2014		
Metal Slug X	SNK Playmore	SNK Playmore	Run and gun	March 7, 2013		
Micro Miners	BonusLevel.org		Puzzle	November 15, 2012		
Might & Magic: Clash of Heroes	Tag Games	Ubisoft	Puzzle, role-playing	January 24, 2013		
Miitomo	Nintendo	Nintendo	Life simulation	JP: March 17, 2016; WW: March 31, 2016		
Minecraft	Mojang; Xbox Game Studios	Mojang	Sandbox	November 17, 2011		
Minecraft: Story Mode	Telltale Games	Telltale Games	Adventure	October 15, 2015		
Minecraft: Story Mode – Season Two	Telltale Games	Telltale Games	Adventure	July 11, 2017		
Mobile Legends: Bang Bang	Moonton	Moonton	Multiplayer online battle arena	November 16, 2016		
Mobile Strike	Machine Zone	Machine Zone	Strategy	July 10, 2015		
Monopoly	EA Mobile	Electronic Arts	Party	November 20, 2009		
Monument Valley	Ustwo Games	Ustwo Games	Puzzle	April 3, 2014		
Monument Valley 2	Ustwo Games	Ustwo Games	Puzzle	June 5, 2017		
MovieCat!	OtherWise Games	OtherWise Games	Trivia	September 11, 2010		
Mushroom Wars 2	Zillion Whales	Zillion Whales	Real-time strategy	October 13, 2016		
Mutant Mudds	Renegade Kid	Renegade Kid	Platformer	December 6, 2012		
My Talking Tom	Outfit7	Outfit7	Virtual pet	November 15, 2013		
My Singing Monsters	Big Blue Bubble	Big Blue Bubble	Musical	September 4, 2012		
Need for Speed: Hot Pursuit	Criterion Games	Electronic Arts	Racing	November 10, 2010	✔	
Need for Speed: Most Wanted	Criterion Games	Electronic Arts	Racing	October 18, 2012		
Nintendo Switch Online	Nintendo	Nintendo	Application software	July 18, 2017		
Nintendo Switch Parental Controls	Nintendo	Nintendo	Application software	March 3, 2017		
Octagon	Lukas Korba	Lukas Kobra	Action	November 7, 2013		
Oddworld: Stranger's Wrath	SquareOne	Oddworld Inhabitants	Action-adventure	November 27, 2014		
OK Golf	Okidokico Entertainment	Okidokico Entertainment	Sports	February 9, 2017		
Pac-Man	Namco Bandai	Namco Bandai	Arcade	July 11, 2008	✔	
Pac-Man + Tournaments	Namco Bandai	Namco Bandai	Arcade	March 22, 2013		
Pac-Man 256	Hipster Whale; 3 Sprockets	Bandai Namco Entertainment	Arcade	August 20, 2015		
Pac-Man Bounce	Namco Bandai	Namco Bandai	Arcade	September 16, 2015		
Pac-Man Championship Edition	Namco Bandai	Namco Bandai	Arcade	December 10, 2009		
Pac-Man Championship Edition DX	Namco Bandai Entertainment	Namco Bandai Entertainment	Arcade	July 23, 2015		
Pac-Man Dash!	Namco Bandai	Namco Bandai	Arcade	July 18, 2013		
Pac-Man Games	Namco Bandai	iNPLAS	Arcade	March 29, 2012		
Pac-Man Kart Rally	Namco Bandai	Namco Bandai	Arcade	December 3, 2012		
Pac-Man Pop!	Mine Loader Software	Namco Bandai	Arcade	August 18, 2016		
Pac-Man Puzzle Tour	Namco Bandai	Namco Bandai	Arcade	February 25, 2016		
Panzer Corps	Lordz Games Studio; Flashback Games	Slitherine Software	Computer wargame	December 13, 2013		
Part Time UFO	HAL Laboratory	HAL Laboratory	Arcade	JP: November 14, 2017; WW: February 26, 2018		
Perchang	Perchang Games	Perchang Games	Puzzle, strategy	June 23, 2016		
Perils of Man	IF Games	IF Games	Adventure	April 28, 2015		
Phoenix Wright: Ace Attorney − Spirit of Justice	Capcom	Capcom	Visual novel	September 21, 2017		
Pictoword	Kooapps	Kooapps	Word game	March 1, 2013		
Pictionary	Etermax	Etermax	Word game	April 26, 2017		
Pikmin Bloom	Niantic	Niantic	Augmented reality	October 26, 2021		
Pillowfight Girls	I-Play	I-Play	Fighting game	May 22, 2010		
Pizza Vs. Skeletons	Riverman Media	Riverman Media	Platformer	February 16, 2012		
Plants vs. Zombies	PopCap Games	PopCap Games	Tower defense	February 15, 2010	✔	
Plants vs. Zombies 2	PopCap Games	Electronic Arts	Tower defense	August 15, 2013		
Pocket Devil	Eyedip	Eyedip	God game	October 12, 2009		
Pocket God	Bolt Creative	Bolt Creative	God game	January 9, 2009		
Pokémon Café ReMix	Genius Sonority	The Pokémon Company	Puzzle	June 23, 2020		
Pokémon Duel	Heroz Japan	The Pokémon Company	Board game	JP: April 19, 2016; WW: January 24, 2017		
Pokémon Go	Niantic	Niantic	Location based game	NA: July 6, 2016; AU: July 6, 2016; EU: July 13, 2016; JP: July 22, 2016		
Pokémon: Magikarp Jump	Select Button	The Pokémon Company	Incremental game	May 24, 2017		
Pokémon Masters	DeNA	DeNA	Role-playing	August 29, 2019		
Pokémon Playhouse	The Pokémon Company	The Pokémon Company	Edutainment	September 21, 2017		
Pokémon Quest	Game Freak	The Pokémon Company	Action-adventure	June 28, 2018		
Pokémon Rumble Rush	Ambrella	The Pokémon Company	Action	July 23, 2019		
Pokémon Shuffle Mobile	Genius Sonority	The Pokémon Company	Puzzle	JP: August 24, 2015; WW: August 31, 2015		
Pokémon Sleep	Select Button; Niantic	The Pokémon Company	Edutainment	June 17, 2023		
Pokémon TCG Online	Dire Wolf Digital	The Pokémon Company	Digital collectible card game	September 30, 2014		
Pokémon Unite	TiMi Studio Group	The Pokémon Company	Multiplayer online battle arena	September 22, 2021		
Poker Night 2	Telltale Games	Telltale Games	Card game	May 23, 2013		
Pretentious Game	Keybol	Bulkypix	Puzzle platformer	December 5, 2013		
Prism	Clint Siu	Clint Siu	Puzzle	February 11, 2016		
Pro Evolution Soccer 2017	Konami	Konami	Sports	NA: September 13, 2016; EU: September 15, 2016; JP: September 15, 2016		
Professional Baseball Spirits A	Konami	Konami	Simulation	JP: October 21, 2015		
Push Panic	Appular	Appular	Tile-matching	November 23, 2010		
Puzzle Agent	Telltale Games	Telltale Games	Adventure, puzzle	June 30, 2010		
Puzzle & Dragons	GungHo Online Entertainment	GungHo Online Entertainment	Tile-matching, role-playing	February 20, 2012		
The Quest	Redshift	Chillingo, Redshift	Role-playing	February 20, 2009		
Quest of Dungeons	Upfall Studios	Upfall Studios	Roguelike	March 25, 2014		
QuizUp	Plain Vanilla Games	Plain Vanilla Games	Trivia	November 7, 2013		
Qvoid	Gavina Games	Gavina Games	Puzzle	July 21, 2011		
R.B.I. Baseball 14	MLB Advanced Media	MLB Advanced Media	Sports	April 8, 2014		
Rayman Fiesta Run	Pastagames	Ubisoft	Platformer	November 7, 2013		
Rayman Jungle Run	Pastagames	Ubisoft	Platformer	August 14, 2012		
Reader Rabbit: Jumpsmarter	Dashalope Games	Games4Kids	Platformer	September 25, 2018		
Reconstrucción	Pathos Audiovisual	Pathos Audiovisual	Adventure	February 8, 2017		
République	Camouflaj; Logan Games	Camouflaj	Stealth	December 19, 2013		
Retro City Rampage DX	Vblank Entertainment	Vblank Entertainment	Action-adventure	March 10, 2016		
Retro Goal	New Star Games	New Star Games	Sports	July 9, 2021		
A Ride into the Mountains	Sunhead Games	Sunhead Games	Action	July 23, 2013		
Ridiculous Fishing	Vlambeer	Vlambeer	Action, sports	March 14, 2013		
Robbery Bob	Level Eight	Chillingo	Stealth, action	May 3, 2012		
Robo Surf	Pieces Interactive	Pieces Interactive	Endless runner	June 1, 2011		
Robot Unicorn Attack	Spiritonin Media Games	Adult Swim	Endless runner	June 2, 2010		
Robot Unicorn Attack Heavy Metal	Spiritonin Media Games	Adult Swim	Endless runner	October 13, 2010		
Rocket Robo	Aaron McElligott	Bad Kraken Games	Puzzle, platformer	January 30, 2014		
Rogue Legacy	Cellar Door Games	Cellar Door Games	Roguelike, platformer	August 8, 2019		
Rome: Total War	Feral Interactive	Feral Interactive	Real-time tactics, turn-based strategy	November 10, 2016		
The Room	Fireproof Games	Fireproof Games	Puzzle	September 12, 2012		
The Room Two	Fireproof Games	Fireproof Games	Puzzle	December 12, 2013		
The Room Three	Fireproof Games	Fireproof Games	Puzzle	November 4, 2015		
Sam & Max Beyond Time and Space	Telltale Games	Telltale Games	Adventure	January 26, 2012		
Sam & Max: The Devil's Playhouse	Telltale Games	Telltale Games	Adventure	April 1, 2010		
Scoops	NimbleBit	NimbleBit	Action	September 18, 2008		
Score! Classic Goals	First Touch	First Touch	Puzzle, soccer	May 17, 2012		
Scramble with Friends	Zynga with Friends	Zynga	Word game	January 4, 2012	✔	
Scribblenauts Remix	5th Cell; Iron Galaxy Studios	Warner Bros. Interactive Entertainment	Puzzle, action	October 11, 2011		
Secret Files: Sam Peters	Animation Arts	Deep Silver	Adventure	October 29, 2014		
Secret Files: Tunguska	Fusionsphere Systems; Animation Arts; Kaiko	Deep Silver	Adventure	July 16, 2014		
Secret Files 2: Puritas Cordis	Fusionsphere Systems; Animation Arts; Kaiko	Deep Silver	Adventure	EU: May 8, 2009; NA: March 29, 2011		
The Secret of Monkey Island: Special Edition	Lucasfilm Games	LucasArts	Adventure	July 15, 2009	✔	
Shin Megami Tensei: Liberation Dx2	Sega	Sega	Massively multiplayer online role-playing	October 23, 2016		
Skullgirls Mobile	Lab Zero Games	Autumn Games	Fighting	May 25, 2017		
The Simpsons Arcade	EA Mobile	EA Mobile	Beat 'em up	December 21, 2009		
The Sims FreePlay	Firemonkeys Studios	EA Mobile	Life simulation game	December 15, 2011		
The Sims Mobile	Firemonkeys Studios	EA Mobile	Life simulation game	March 6, 2018		
The Simpsons: Tapped Out	EA Mobile	EA Mobile	Simulation	February 29, 2012		
Skylanders: SuperChargers	Vicarious Visions; Beenox	Activision	Toys-to-life, role-playing, action-adventure, platform, racing	NA: September 20, 2015		
Skylanders: Trap Team	Toys for Bob	Activision	Toys-to-life, role-playing, action-adventure, platform	AU: October 2, 2014; NA: October 5, 2014; EU: October 10, 2014		
Shapist	Dmitry Kurilchenko	Qixen-P Design LLP	Puzzle	2014		
Spinzizzle	PressOK Entertainment		Puzzle	May 21, 2010		
Slydris	Radiangames	Radiangames	Puzzle	July 26, 2012		
Smash Hit	Mediocre	Mediocre	Rail shooter	March 6, 2014		
Sneaky Sneaky	Naiad Entertainment	Naiad Entertainment	Stealth	November 12, 2014		
Snoticles	Adult Swim Games	Adult Swim Games	Puzzle	December 15, 2011		
Sonic & All-Stars Racing Transformed	Sumo Digital	Sega	Racing	January 2, 2014		
Sonic & Sega All-Stars Racing	Sumo Digital	Sega	Racing	June 18, 2011		
Sonic CD	Sonic Team	Sega	Platformer	December 15, 2011		
Sonic Dash	Hardlight	Sega	Endless runner	March 7, 2013		
Sonic Dash 2: Sonic Boom	Hardlight	Sega	Endless runner	October 8, 2015		
Sonic Forces: Speed Battle	Hardlight	Sega	Endless runner	November 2, 2017		
Sonic the Hedgehog	Sonic Team	Sega	Platformer	December 18, 2007		
Sonic the Hedgehog 2	Sonic Team	Sega	Platformer	April 20, 2010		
Sonic the Hedgehog 4: Episode I	Sonic Team; Dimps	Sega	Platformer	October 7, 2010		
Sonic the Hedgehog 4: Episode II	Sonic Team; Dimps	Sega	Platformer	May 17, 2012		
Sonic Jump	Hardlight	Sega	Vertical platformer	October 18, 2012		
Sonic Jump Fever	Hardlight	Sega	Vertical platformer	July 10, 2014		
Sonic Racing	Hardlight	Sega	Racing	September 19, 2019		
Sonic Runners	Sonic Team	Sega	Endless runner, platformer	June 25, 2015		
Sonic Runners Adventure	Gameloft	Gameloft	Endless runner	December 20, 2017		
Space Ace	Digital Leisure	Digital Leisure	Interactive movie	May 27, 2009		
Space Marshals	PixelBite	PixelBite	Third-person shooter	January 9, 2015		
Space Miner: Space Ore Bust	Venan Entertainment	Venan Entertainment	Role-playing	February 5, 2010		
Spin Up	Nenad Katic	Nenad Katic	Arcade	March 28, 2012		
Sprinkle Islands	Mediocre	Mediocre	Puzzle	July 11, 2013		
Spy Mouse	Firemonkeys Studios	Electronic Arts	Puzzle	August 25, 2011		
Star Hammer: The Vanguard Prophecy	Black Lab Games	Slitherine Software	Turn-based strategy	December 10, 2015		
Star Wars: Galaxy of Heroes	EA Capital Games	Electronic Arts	Puzzle	November 24, 2015		
StarDunk	Godzilab	Playdigious	Sports	July 12, 2010		
SteamWorld Heist	Image & Form	Image & Form	Turn-based strategy, action-adventure	November 9, 2016	✔	
Stickets	Wanderlands	Wanderlands	Tile-matching	May 30, 2013		
Stranger Things: The Game	BonusXP; Netflix	BonusXP	Action-adventure	October 4, 2017		
Streets of Rage	Sega	Sega	Beat 'em up	September 14, 2009		
Super Hexagon	Terry Cavanagh	Terry Cavanagh	Twitch	August 31, 2012		
Super Mario Run	Nintendo EPD	Nintendo	Platformer	December 15, 2016		
Super Meat Boy Forever	Team Meat	Team Meat	Action	April 20, 2023		
Super Monkey Ball Bounce	Sega Networks	Sega	Puzzle	September 3, 2014		
Superbrothers: Sword & Sworcery EP	Capybara Games; Superbrothers	Capybara Games	Adventure	March 24, 2011		
Sweatshop	Littleloud; Channel Four Television	Channel Four Television	Tower defense, simulation	July 18, 2011		
Swordigo	Touch Foo	Touch Foo	Action-adventure	March 12, 2012		
Tales from the Borderlands	Telltale Games	Telltale Games	Adventure	December 11, 2014		
Tales of Monkey Island	Telltale Games	Telltale Games, LucasArts	Adventure	November 4, 2011		
Temple Run	Imangi Studios	Imangi Studios	Endless runner	August 4, 2011		
Temple Run 2	Imangi Studios	Imangi Studios	Endless runner	January 16, 2013		
Temple Run Brave	Imangi Studios	Disney Interactive Studios	Endless runner	June 14, 2012		
TerraGenesis	Tilting Point	Tilting Point	Simulation	July 6, 2016		
Terraria	Codeglue	505 Games	Action-adventure, sandbox	August 29, 2013		
Terminator Genisys: Future War	Plarium	Plarium	MMO, strategy	May 18, 2017		
Tetris	EA Mobile	Electronic Arts	Puzzle	December 1, 2011		
Theatrhythm Final Fantasy	Square Enix	Square Enix	Rhythm	December 13, 2012		
Thomas Was Alone	Mike Bithell	Bossa Studios	Puzzle-platformer	May 15, 2014		
Threes!	Sirvo	Sirvo	Puzzle	February 6, 2014		
Thumb Drift	SMG Studio	SMG Studio	Action	February 18, 2016		
Tilt to Live	One Man Left	One Man Left	Action	February 24, 2010		
Tiny Troopers	Kukouri Mobile Entertainment	Chillingo	Action	June 7, 2012		
Tiny Wings	Andreas Illiger	Andreas Illiger	Arcade	February 18, 2011		
Toy Story 3: The Video Game	Avalanche Software	Disney Interactive Studios	Action, platform	June 15, 2010		
Toy Story Mania!	Walt Disney Internet Group	Walt Disney Internet Group	Party	August 14, 2009		
Trism	Demiforce	Demiforce	Puzzle	July 13, 2008		
Trivia Crack	Etermax	Etermax	Trivia	October 26, 2013		
Turbo Dismount	Secret Exit Ltd.	Secret Exit Ltd.	Action, vehicle simulator	September 24, 2014		
TwinGo!	SpaceNoize	Chillingo	Puzzle	March 8, 2012		
Uno	Gameloft	Gameloft	Card game	November 14, 2008	✔	
Valiant Hearts: The Great War	Ubisoft Montpellier	Ubisoft	Puzzle, adventure	September 4, 2014		
Venezolario	Katty Kanzler	Ronald Kanzler	Word	July 12, 2025		
VS. Racing	Maciek Drejak Labs	Northcube	Racing	June 17, 2011		
VS. Racing 2	Maciek Drejak Labs	Northcube	Racing	August 31, 2012		
Voez	Rayark	Rayark	Rhythm	May 26, 2016		
VVVVVV	Terry Cavanagh	Terry Cavanagh	Platformer	May 30, 2014		
The Walking Dead: Season One	Telltale Games	Telltale Games	Adventure	July 26, 2012		
The Walking Dead: Season Two	Telltale Games	Telltale Games	Adventure	December 18, 2013		
The Wall	Ludia	NBC	Game show	JP: December 28, 2016; NA: March 22, 2017	✔	
Warhammer 40,000: Armageddon	Flashback Games; The Lordz Games Studio	Slitherine Software	Computer wargame	June 19, 2015		
Warhammer 40,000: Deathwatch	Rodeo Games	Rodeo Games	Turn-based tactics	July 16, 2015		
Warhammer Quest	Rodeo Games	Rodeo Games	Tactical role-playing	May 30, 2013		
Warhammer Quest 2: The End Times	Perchang Games	Perchang Games	Tactical role-playing	October 19, 2017		
Warhammer Quest: Silver Tower	Perchang Games	Perchang Games	Tactical role-playing	September 3, 2020		
We Bare Bears Match3 Repairs	SundayToz	SundayToz	Puzzle	April 10, 2018		
Whale Trail	Ustwo	Ustwo	Endless runner	November 20, 2011		
Wheels of Aurelia	Santa Ragione	Santa Ragione	Visual novel	September 20, 2016		
Where's My Mickey?	Creature Feep	Disney Mobile	Puzzle	June 19, 2013	✔	
Where's My Perry?	Creature Feep	Disney Mobile	Puzzle	June 28, 2012	✔	
Where's My Water?	Creature Feep	Disney Mobile	Puzzle	September 22, 2011	✔	
Whispers of a Machine	Clifftop Games	Raw Fury	Adventure	April 17, 2019		
The Wolf Among Us	Telltale Games	Telltale Games	Adventure	December 4, 2013		
Wonderputt	Reece Millidge	Damp Gnat	Sports	September 12, 2012		
Wooords	Stray Robot Games	Stray Robot Games	Word game	July 21, 2011		
Words with Friends	Zynga	Zynga	Word game	July 9, 2009	✔	
The World Ends with You -Solo Remix-	h.a.n.d.; Square Enix	Square Enix	Role-playing	August 27, 2012		
World of Goo	2D Boy	2D Boy	Puzzle	December 16, 2010		
XCOM: Enemy Within	Firaxis Games	2K Games	Turn-based tactics	November 13, 2014		
X-Men: Battle of the Atom	PlayNext 51	PlayNext 51, Marvel Entertainment	Card battle	August 28, 2013		
Yakuza Online	Sega	Sega	Massively multiplayer online role-playing	October 23, 2016		
Year Walk	Simogo	Simogo	Adventure	February 21, 2013		
Yo-kai Watch: Wibble Wobble	Level-5	Level-5	Puzzle, Role-playing	JP: October 28, 2015; NA: March 24, 2016; EU: March 30, 2017		
Yu-Gi-Oh! Duel Links	Konami	Konami	Card game	JP: November 17, 2016; WW: January 11, 2017		
Zombie Gunship	Limbic Software	Limbic Software	Arcade	July 21, 2011		
Zombie Parkour Runner	Up Up Down Down	Break Media	Platformer	October 8, 2011		
Zynga Poker	Zynga	Zynga	Card game	May 14, 2010		

== See also ==
- App Store (iOS/iPadOS)
- List of free and open-source iOS applications
