= New star =

New star or New Star may refer to:

== Arts ==
- New Star Music, a Romanian music group
- Golden Globe Award for New Star of the Year – Actor, one of the Golden Globe Awards
- Golden Globe Award for New Star of the Year - Actress, one of the Golden Globe Awards
- "New Star", a song by Tears for Fears

== Others ==
- Star formation, a process of in which new stars are formed
- Henderson New Star, formerly New Star Asset Management, management of funds
- New Star BBC, a Burundian basketball club
- New Star Games, an independent video game developer
- New Star Soccer, a video game series developed by New Star Games
- New Star incident, a February 2009 incident in which the Chinese-owned cargo ship New Star was sunk by Russian coast guard in Sea of Japan

== See also ==
- Nova, short for "stella nova", Latin for "new star", when a new "star" appears in the heavens of the Middle Ages, were referred to as "novae"
