= New Star GP =

2023 video game

- Steam edition cover
- Developer: New Star Games
- Publisher: Five Aces Publishing
- Engine: Unity
- Platforms: Microsoft Windows; Nintendo Switch; PlayStation 4; Xbox One; Android; iOS
- Release: 8 August 2023
- Genre: Racing
- Modes: Single-player, multiplayer

New Star GP is a 2023 racing video game developed by New Star Games and published by Five Aces Publishing.

== Gameplay ==
There are two game modes available in New Star GP: Career, in which the player competes in seasons spanning multiple Grands Prix and minor races, and Championship, single-race games with customisable settings. In both, the player plays the role of a Formula One driver, racing their car against nine opponents. The game spans five decades of racing history, from the 1980s to the present day.

Each race, held on one of 34 circuits resembling official Formula One tracks, consists of six laps. Players may pit between laps to refuel their car, change tires, and fix broken components.

After each race, the player receives payout, known as "Bux", based on their performance, which they may spend on upgrading or temporarily licensing car parts and improving morale of team staff. Each part provides a boost to the car's performance; for example, upgrading the front wing increases downforce and handling, while an increase in engine performance makes acceleration faster. Likewise, morale improves the efficiency of other race-related aspects, such as repairs, pitting, and sponsorships. Points are given based on the player's standing in a race, with the winner receiving ten, second receiving six, and so on. They determine a driver's standing in the championship, which are used to determine advancement in Career mode.

== Development and release ==
New Star GP was developed by Oxford-based studio New Star Games, an indie studio best known for their games Retro Bowl and Retro Goal, and published by Five Aces Publishing. It was initially released for PlayStation 4, Nintendo Switch, and Xbox One on 8 August 2023, before being ported to Steam on 7 March 2024, and iOS and Android on 18 March 2025. The studio intends to release a higher frame rate version for Switch 2 in the future.

== Reception ==
The game received favorable reviews upon release. Review aggregator Metacritic gave New Star GP a score of 81, while OpenCritic, another aggregator, gave it 80.
