= Spin up =

Spin up may refer to:

- Neutron star spin-up, the increase in rotational speed over time in neutron stars
- Spin-up, the process of starting rotating storage
- Spin up, a direction of spin in quantum mechanics
- Spin Up, a 2012 video game
