= Blast-A-Way =

2012 video game

- App icon
- Developer(s): Illusion Labs
- Publisher(s): Illusion Labs
- Platform(s): iOS
- Release: August 30, 2012
- Genre(s): Puzzle
- Mode(s): Single-player

Blast-A-Way is a 2012 puzzle video game developed and published by the Swedish studio Illusion Labs. The player controls a robot who must rescue creatures named Boxies by clearing paths from using their provided tools. Conceptualized from an image made by one of the studio's artists, the game was developed over a nine-month period. Released on August 30, 2012, for iOS, the game received praise for its gameplay and minimalist design but criticism for its controls.

== Gameplay ==
In Blast-A-Way, the player must rescue Boxies by breaking the level's obstacles.

Blast-A-Way is a puzzle video game. In each of the game's 80 levels, the player must clear paths to collect creatures, known as Boxies, by using their provided tools, including bombs and teleporters.

== Development and release ==
Blast-A-Way was developed by the Swedish studio Illusion Labs, who previously created mobile games such as Touchgrind (2008) and Labyrinth 2 (2009). The game's concept originated from an image of box-headed robots throwing bombs, created by one of the studio's artists. Initially an action game, Blast-A-Way would gradually become a puzzle game through its nine months of development; four were spent on prototyping, while the remaining months were spent on developing the game. The game was developed with Xcode, Adobe Photoshop, and 3D software in which they had built their own level editor.

The game's minimalist design was decided early in development; the studio decided to only use shading until they implemented textures to make the game "a little more appealing" to consumers. Controls took approximately a month to develop. Since the game was three-dimensional, the developers opted for a throwing mechanism instead of a slingshot mechanism. Blast-A-Way was released for iOS on August 30, 2012.

== Reception ==
Reception

Aggregate score
Aggregator	Score
Metacritic	87/100

Review scores
Publication	Score
Gamezebo	80/100
MeriStation	7/10
Pocket Gamer	4/5
TouchArcade	4/5
148Apps	4/5
AppSpy	5/5
Digital Spy	4/5
Multiplayer.it	9/10
Slide to Play	Must Have

On Metacritic, Blast-A-Way has a "generally favorable" score of 87 based on 10 critics.

Multiple publications praised the game.

The game's controls received mixed opinions. Although some critics found them simple, others said they were tricky to handle. Reviewers pointed issues in rotating the game's camera.
