= Nord (video game) =

2009 video game

- Developer: Skygoblin
- Publisher: Skygoblin
- Engine: jMonkey Engine
- Platform: Facebook
- Release: April 8, 2009 (Online); September 22, 2010 (Facebook)
- Genre: MMORPG

Nord was a free 3D MMORPG that was playable online and on Facebook by SLX games, which became Skygoblin after their merger with the developer of The Journey Down. Nord was the first virtual world on Facebook that was presented in full 3D.

== Release ==
Nord was originally released online on April 8, 2009. On September 22, 2010, the game was adapted to be played on Facebook. Nord is however running down operations starting in September in preparation for final closure set for December 29, 2013.
