= Grappling Hook (video game) =

2009 video game

- Developer(s): Christian Teister
- Engine: jMonkeyEngine
- Platform(s): Linux, Mac OS X, Windows
- Release: NA: September 18, 2009; (Macintosh): NA: September 21, 2009; (Windows)
- Genre(s): First-person shooter, puzzle
- Mode(s): Single-player

Grappling Hook is a first-person shooter video game which contains both platform and puzzle elements. It was released on September 18, 2009 for the Windows platform and on September 21 for Mac OS X, a Linux version was later released. The player must collect passcodes from throughout 31 three dimensional stages, using the titular grappling hook to swing from green surfaces in order to progress.

The game was created by German developer Christian Teister, the sole member of SpeedRunGames, who had previously worked on some smaller indie games and the stealth game Velvet Assassin. Inspired by a fast-paced first-person shooter mod called Cold Ice, Teister wished to couple the mod's speed with the puzzle gameplay made possible by the grappling hook.

== Gameplay ==
Grappling Hook has little plot. The object is to complete the challenges set by a malicious computer. Play is focused on speed. The player begins in the first of 31 three-dimensional stages, which are viewed from the first-person perspective, tasked with reaching the exit. The exit will only open once diamond-shaped passcodes have been collected from around the current stage. The titular grappling gun is acquired after the earliest stages have been completed. Moving platforms must be crossed, health-depleting electrified panels must be avoided, and green surfaces can be grappled in order to swing towards the stage exit. In later stages, defensive turrets begin to appear, firing directly at the player-character, and swinging with the grappling hook also becomes more difficult, requiring the player to time the release of the grappling hook very precisely. In addition, grappling hook jumps may require leaps of faith - the next green surface to grapple from may not be visible until after the player-character has been launched through the air.

The full game is available for free on the game's website. A level editor is included with the full game. Use of the level editor can be enabled within the game's option menu, enabling developer-mode. Within this mode the player can create Grappling Hook stages, each of which takes the form of an octree, a cube which has been divided into eight equal parts and then divided further. Stages can be manipulated, cubes created and surfaces added. It is also possible to change the starting point of the stage, dictating where play will start.

== Development ==
SpeedRunGames is a one-man development outfit run by computational visualistics student Christian Teister. Having studied since 2001, Teister developed some small video games before being hired to work on the stealth video game Velvet Assassin during 2008 and early 2009. Work on Grappling Hook began after the developer finished work on Velvet Assassin, development of Grappling Hook began in March 2009. The previously created smaller games gave Teister the experience necessary to undertake Grappling Hook. One, a mobile game named Gladiator, provided the animation system used in Grappling Hook.

Grappling Hook was inspired by a Half-Life mod called Cold Ice. Teister wanted to build on the "feeling of acceleration and velocity" from Cold Ice with the use of the grappling hook; "I think the spatial puzzles are perfect to encourage the player to explore how the grappling hook can be used."
