= DigiDrummer =

- Developer: Magnick Software
- Publisher: Magnick Software
- Designer: Magnick Software
- Series: DigiDrummer
- Platform: iPhone
- Release: September 26, 2008
- Genre: Music
- Mode: Single-player

DigiDrummer was a music video game made and published by Magnick Software for iOS. It was developed by Nicholas Rudolfsky and Magnus Larsson. DigiDrummer received its last update on October 27, 2009 in the form of version 3.9. It is no longer available on Apple's App Store.

== Reception ==
DigiDrummer reached the top 7 in December 2009 on Apple's App Store. It won the iPhone Excellence Award in 2008.

== See also ==
- List of iPhone OS games
