= Zombie Parkour Runner =

2011 video game

- Developer: Up Up Down Down
- Publisher: Break Media
- Platform: iOS
- Release: 2011
- Genre: Platformer
- Mode: Single-player

Zombie Parkour Runner is an iOS game developed by American studio Up Up Down Down and published in 2011 by Break Media. It is available for free in the App Store.

== Summary ==
The character, Kara, has been robbed by zombies. In an attempt to retrieve stolen items, the player must parkour through 24 levels. The player can purchase in-app items such as a level pack.

== Gameplay ==
Zombie Parkour Runner is an auto-running platform game. It features context-sensitive, one touch controls with manually-designed levels. Players are rewarded points and score multipliers for successfully performing parkour within the environment or while evading zombies.

Players can retrieve one stolen item within each level. Once collected, these items are returned to Kara's house where a description can be read. These descriptions present an additional, non-traditional narrative and often allude to a "he". The story reveals who "he" is when players collect the household item found in level 3–8.

Twelve additional levels can be downloaded after an in-app purchase. These levels are more difficult than those found within the core game. An additional twelve items can be retrieved for players who want to further the story.

== Zombie Parkour Runner Plus ==
On January 5, 2013, the app was re-released for free under the name Zombie Parkour Runner Plus, with the additional levels originally available via in-app purchases made available. This version was published through Shanghai Break Entertainment, rather than Break Media.

== Reception ==
Zombie Parkour Runner was received well, having an overall rating of 4 1/2 stars from over 2,900 users on iTunes. 88 out of 100 on Delta Attack, and 7 out of 10 from IGN Its sequel, Zombie Parkour Runner Plus, received a rating of 3 1/2 stars from 68 users on iTunes.
