= Shapist =

2014 video game

- Developer: Dmitry Kurilchenko
- Publisher: Qixen-P Design LLP
- Artist: Takemura Ori
- Engine: Unity 3D
- Platforms: iOS; Android
- Genre: Puzzle
- Mode: Single-player

Shapist is a puzzle video game developed by Dmitry Kurilchenko and published by Qixen-P Design LLP. It was released for iOS and Android on 2014.

== Gameplay ==
The objective of each level is to clear away the door, a 3 by 2 tile box with 6 triangles in the middle. The door is blocked by several blocks of various shapes, which must be maneuvered around. The first levels only have regular blocks, but as the game progresses, different types of blocks are added. These blocks are explained below and have different properties and increase the level of difficulty.

=== Regular Blocks ===
These are normal blocks that only move into empty spaces. They are the first blocks to appear in the game and range widely in shape, size, and color. They do not interact with each other unless pushed into another by the player. Their shape is fixed unlike other blocks; only their location can be altered.

=== Magnetic Blocks ===
Magnetic blocks are the next blocks that are introduced to the player. They are different colored blocks that when magnetically connected to another block, have an orange line attach them. Magnet blocks repel blocks of the same color, but can be dragged next to each other by the player. Magnet blocks are only affected by what is immediately next to them so they will only repel along columns or rows of tiles in the game. This also means that they can be formed into non-linear shapes with ease. They automatically connect to an adjacent magnet block of a different color and must be manually separated by double tapping one of the blocks.

=== Spring Blocks ===
Spring blocks are the next block introduced. They can be contracted by the player, and after a few seconds will expand automatically to fill up spaces. These blocks have the ability to squeeze into small places and be pinned down so they cannot expand again. The blocks are always rectangular and appear blue with an orange 'Z' as the spring.

=== Shape changing Blocks ===
At its most difficult levels, the game introduces blocks with a square shape that can be transformed into triangle by pulling the corners inward. The player can restore the original square shape by tapping twice on the block if the space around it allows for transformation.

== Recognitions and awards ==
- Best Mobile Game nomination at Indie Prize Amsterdam 2014
- Featured on Vsauce's "App All Knight" #22
