= Cover Orange =

2009 video game

- Developers: FDG Entertainment, Johnny-K
- Publishers: FDG Entertainment, Johnny-K
- Series: Cover Orange
- Platforms: iOS, Android, Adobe Flash
- Release: Oct 21, 2009 (Adobe Flash), November 16, 2010 (iOS)

Cover Orange is an iOS, Android and flash game developed by German studio FDG Entertainment and released on November 16, 2010. It is a port of an Adobe Flash game of the same name.

== Gameplay ==
Throughout each level, the player must place down stage elements to alter the environment and protect oranges from the acid rain of an evil cloud. These stage elements may vary in any way, from a triangular block to spiked balls that destroy ice to the oranges themselves. The cloud is activated by the last placed element, so there is no changing the setup once that is done. If the player causes an orange to fall off the stage or gets hit by the acid rain, they will be forced to restart the level. There are some stars the player can receive that boost their score: one for completing the level, one for placing down all of the stage elements within a time limit, and one for tapping a star during the acid rain downpour when it appears.

== Reception ==
Reception

Review scores
Publication	Score
GamePro	4/5
Gamezebo	4/5
IGN	8.5/10
Jeuxvideo.com	16/20
TouchArcade	4/5
VideoGamer.com	8/10
Macworld	4/5

The game has a Metacritic score of 82% based on 8 critics. The HD version has a rating of 85% based on 4 critics.

SlideToPlay wrote "We were soundly impressed by the level design, animation, and creativity of Cover Orange HD. It's a Must Have game for the iPad, especially if you love other great physics puzzlers like Angry Birds and Cut the Rope." GamePro said "Like other great physics puzzlers on the App Store, Cover Orange consistently adds plenty of variation to its puzzles as players progress. " Touch Arcade said "I know it's not the same sort of game, but if you like Angry Birds and its ilk, I think Cover Orange will be worth your while - there's just a spiritual similarity of sorts going on there. "
