= Swordigo =

2012 video game

- Developer: Touch Foo
- Publisher: Touch Foo
- Platforms: iOS, Android
- Release: WW: March 22, 2012
- Genres: Action-adventure, Metroidvania
- Mode: Single-player

Swordigo is a 2012 action-adventure platform game created by Finnish indie studio Touch Foo. The game is similar to Zelda II: The Adventure of Link, Metroid, and Castlevania: Symphony of the Night.

== Gameplay ==
Swordigo is a side-scrolling action-adventure game in which the player can run, jump, swing their sword, and use magic spells. By defeating enemies, the player will gain experience; upon leveling up, they can choose to upgrade one of their attributes (health, attack power, or magic.) They will also find new items and equipment that will make them more powerful and grant new abilities (bombs blow up certain walls, magic bolts activate buttons and hit enemies, etc.), additionally being able to buy items from shops in villages and various locations using money reaped from defeated enemies, cutting plants, destroying boxes, and breaking vases. Weapons and Armor play a very important role, as the amount of damage done to an enemy depends on the weapon and the damage received can be decreased through armor. The player can bring up a map at any time, which keeps track of their location and the areas they have already visited; they will also find portals that will allow them to quickly backtrack to previous areas.

== Plot ==
The game opens when a young man, whose name is unknown, awakens from a dream of the death of his master. He leaves his house and ventures into the forest to find his master, and is shocked to find him dead. He reads a note on the body of his master, which speaks of dark, evil monsters known as the Corruptors. He is then attacked by one of them, and is knocked unconscious. He awakens some time later, where the elder of his village sends him off on a journey to find a magical sword called the Mageblade, the only thing with the ability to destroy the Corruptors. Along the way, he finds the ghost of his master, who points him in the right direction. Eventually, the young hero finds the dungeon where the Mageblade is usually kept. But waiting for him is the same Corruptor who killed his master and knocked him out, who reveals that they destroyed the Mageblade. After killing him, the hero acquires the first piece of the shattered Mageblade. He then continues his journey, discovering more magical spells and is guided by his deceased master. Eventually, after having assembled the Mageblade, his master confronts him one last time and sends him to another dimension called the Worlds End Keep. He battles a doppelgänger of himself, The Master of Chaos, the lord of the Corruptors. After vanquishing his foe, the game ends, but scrolling text tells the story of how he became the guard of the King of Florennum (A city featured in the game), but eventually went back to his quiet life in his home village.

== Reception ==
Reception

Aggregate score
Aggregator	Score
Metacritic	86/100

Review score
Publication	Score
TouchArcade	4.5/5

Swordigo received positive reviews, currently sitting at 86/100 on Metacritic. AppSpy scored it 5/5, praising its "short, but incredibly addictive gameplay" as well as its "gorgeous presentation and wonderful soundtrack". TouchArcade awarded the game 4.5 stars out of 5, saying that the consumer "shouldn't look to this game for an original story—Swordigo goes well beyond nodding to Link and his crew", but nevertheless concluding that while "Touch Foo may be treading familiar ground ... it does so with great skill." Pocket Gamer scored the game 8/10, writing, "If you're a fan of action-RPGs like Nintendo’s Zelda (specifically the side-scrolling NES instalment Adventure of Link) then Swordigo is almost certain to find a place in your heart", adding that their "only real grumble is that the visuals could be better." Gamezebo gave Swordigo 4 stars out of 5, criticizing its "horribly derivative" presentation and saying "[t]he characters aren’t memorable, nor do any of the regions particularly stand out", but still praising the game overall, writing that "[a]nyone comfortable with the “Metroidvania” style of platforming will feel right at home here".
