= GamePigeon =

Mobile application

- App Store icon
- Developer: Vitalii Zlotskii
- Release: 13 September 2016; 10 years ago
- Stable release: 2.2.4 / 6 April 2022; 4 years ago
- Operating system: iOS
- Size: 83.7 MB
- Website: gamepigeonapp.com

GamePigeon is a mobile app for iOS devices, developed by Vitalii Zlotskii and released on September 13, 2016. The game takes advantage of the iOS 10 update, which expanded how users could interact with Apple's Messages app. GamePigeon is only available through the Messages app, which allows players to start and respond to different party games in conversations.

== Release ==
The app was first released on September 13, 2016, coinciding with the launch of iOS 10. The app was released for free, although it includes in-app purchases to unlock additional items, such as cosmetic skins, avatar items, new game modes, and an option to remove ads.

== Games in the app ==
The following is a list of games that users can play within GamePigeon:

- 8-ball
- 9-ball
- 20 questions
- Archery
- Basketball
- Checkers
- Chess
- Crazy 8
- Cup pong
- Darts
- Dots and boxes
- Filler
- Four in a row
- Gomoku
- Knockout
- Mancala
- Miniature golf
- Paintball
- Reversi
- Sea battle
- Shuffleboard
- Tanks
- Word games
  - Anagrams
  - Word bites
  - Word hunt

Poker was one of the games included in GamePigeon at launch, although it has since been removed and is no longer listed on the game's App Store description.

== Reception ==
GamePigeon has enjoyed commercial success, with VentureBeat noting that GamePigeon was ranked number-one in the "Top Free" category of the iMessage App Store, six months after its release. Critically, GamePigeon has been generally well received, being highlighted by online media publications early on shortly after the iOS 10 launch. It has since been included on many "best iMessage apps" lists. Based on over 162,000 ratings, the game holds a 4.0 out of 5 rating on the App Store. Julian Chokkattu of Digital Trends wrote "GamePigeon should be like the pre-installed versions of Solitaire and Minesweeper that used to come with older iterations of Windows." On its launch day, Boy Genius Report included it on a list of "10 of the best iMessage apps, games and stickers for iOS 10 on launch day." The Daily Dot wrote, "GamePigeon is easily the best current gaming option within iMessages."

8-ball and cup pong have been particularly well received by media outlets. The Daily Dot had specific praise for the app's billiards game: "8-Ball controls shockingly smoothly with your fingers, and there’s nothing quite like destroying a dear friend in poker." During his 2020 U.S. presidential campaign, Cory Booker was cited as playing the game with his family.

In 2017, CNBC cited one teenager who expressed that GamePigeon was one of just a few reasons that those in her age range use the iMessage app. The game was highlighted as a way to maintain social distancing guidelines during the COVID-19 pandemic.
