= Mega Run =

2012 mobile video game

- Developer: Get Set Games
- Platforms: iOS, Android and Windows Phone
- Release: May 29, 2012

Mega Run (also known as Mega Run: Redford's Adventure) is an endless running game developed by Canadian studio Get Set Games and released on May 29, 2012. It was released for iOS, Android and Microsoft Windows via the Microsoft Store. However, the game was pulled out of the Google Play Store. It is the direct sequel to Mega Jump, a similar mobile game developed by Get Set Games that was released two years prior.

== Reception ==
The game has a Metacritic score of 86% based on 6 critic reviews.

148Apps wrote "Mega Run is still a fantastic auto-runner though. The choice for set levels was an inspired one, and it will take plenty of time to play and master them all. The fact that it looks great and has cloud saving is just the cherry on top." TouchArcade said "Mega Run is an engrossing, vibrant game that has a fantastic presentation, controls and art direction. At its core, the action is pretty standard, but the execution is near flawless. Give it a spin." Gamezebo wrote "Perhaps the only real frustration of Mega Run lies in the game's somewhat frequent crashes, which left me less than enchanted as I scrolled through the game's menus all over again. Menus which, oddly enough, are perhaps the only non-juicy things about the game, with commands awkwardly labelled, making navigation a sticking point."

Multiplayer.it said "Mega Run - Redford's Adventure is a very well done running platform game, rich in content, completely free and extremely addictive." AppSpy wrote "Mega Run - Redford's Adventure doesn't water down its gameplay and in fact, shows auto-runners on the store just how they should do it, bringing plenty of fun power-ups and clever level layouts to the table, making it a must try title." Modojo said "Mega Run is a lovely game that oozes charm and will delight players of all ages. Even if you think you can't possibly bear to play another screen-tapping automatic runner, we're pretty sure you'll fall in love with Redford's adventure regardless."
