= Reconstrucción =

2017 Colombian video game

- Developer(s): Pathos Audiovisual
- Publisher(s): Pathos Audiovisual
- Platform(s): Android, iOS
- Release: 2017
- Genre(s): Graphic adventure; Interactive drama
- Mode(s): Single-player

Reconstrucción (lit. 'Reconstruction') is a Colombian mobile video game developed by Pathos Audiovisual. It was released for Android and iOS in 2017. The game depicts the Colombian conflict, following Victoria, a woman that returns to her village after fifteen years.

== Gameplay ==
Reconstrucción is a graphic adventure, played from a third-person perspective. The player, as protagonist Victoria, needs to make choices that will impacts the game's story.

== Synopsis ==
The game is set in the Urabá Antioquia region of Colombia and starts when Victoria was a child, the protagonist and an Afro-Colombian woman. Paramilitaries entered Pueblo escondido (lit. 'Hidden town') and summoned the entire town in the main square. A man, affiliated with a United Self-Defense Forces of Colombia ribbon on his arm, started calling out her neighbors with a list in his hand. After Victoria asks her grandfather Mateo to do something, the paramilitaries pass him to the front to set an example out of him. Victoria returns to Pueblo escondido fifteen years later, and the player's choices determine whether she becomes a social leader that endures the paramilitary siege, a victim of forced displacement or is forced to join an armed group to save her life.

== Development ==
The game's development started in October 2015, and its team consisted in at least twelve professionals including artists, designers, social researchers, programmers and journalists. Its idea started with Álvaro Triana, coordinator of ViveLab Bogotá at the National University of Colombia, who, surprised by the journalistic accounts of the war, which included massacres, assassinations, and forced displacements, sought a new way to tell the thousands of testimonies and stories about the conflict to young people. Álvaro teamed up with documentary filmmaker Patricia Ayala, director of Pathos Audiovisual, who was knowledgeable of the subject through her work and developed the video game's first scripts. After winning a call for proposals of the German Agency for International Cooperation, the agency also collaborated with the game's funding.

The game development involved the inclusion of real life testimonies, as well as the inclusion of newspapers, telegrams, photos and books. The developers also conducted interviews in Bogotá and the Guaviare Department, updating each version with adjustments. ViveLab was advised by Colombia's National Center for Historical Memory and organizations of victims and former combatants for the characters development.

The objective of the game was to tell the story of the Colombian conflict in a pedagogical way, setting the story through recurring scenarios of the war, including the towns takeovers, forced displacements and guerrilla camps, to immerse those who did not live through the war in the reality of the victims and former combatants. At the same time, the game's design took care to not portray depictions of physical prowess or the use of violence, avoiding stereotypical video games orientations about armed conflicts.
