= TwinGo! =

2012 video game

- Developer: SpaceNoize
- Publisher: Chillingo
- Platform: iOS
- Release: March 8, 2012
- Genre: Puzzle
- Mode: Single-player

TwinGo! is a 2012 puzzle game developed by Portuguese developer SpaceNoize and published by Chillingo. It was released for iOS on March 8, 2012.

== Reception ==
The game has a Metacritic score of 84% based on 6 reviews.

Modojo said, "TwinGo!'s a breath of fresh air in the puzzle genre, a brightly colored, cute and immensely addictive game that's worth $0.99 and even more. Two big thumbs up." Gamezebo wrote, "TwinGo! is an experience which is simple, yet challenging (and very accommodating), and full of charm." 148Apps said, "The only real issue I have with TwinGo! is that the entire first world is just far too easy." AppSpy wrote "Swiping puzzle fun. Yes we've seen this concept before but Twingo pulls it off with great presentation and a truck full of content." Pocket Gamer said, "A smartly designed, surprisingly taxing puzzler that makes the most of its elegantly simple core." AppSmile wrote, "Despite an all-too-easy first set of puzzles and the absence of move counters, TwinGo! more than makes up for its shortcomings with clever designs and the elemental make-ups of the twins playing an important role."
