= Banzai Rabbit =

2010 video game

- Developer(s): Revolutionary Concepts
- Publisher(s): Revolutionary Concepts
- Platform(s): iOS
- Release: June 9, 2010
- Mode(s): Single-player

Banzai Rabbit is a video game developed by Australian studio Revolutionary Concepts for iOS and released in 2010. Banzai Rabbit is a 3D clone of Konami's 1981 Frogger arcade game. It follows rabbit humanoid Banzai trying to save people from The Flea, another humanoid created in a lab accident. This game had anti-piracy protection. If the older versions of this game get pirated that it has not purchased, After you complete the first level (Second level in the 1.0 version) It goes back to Main Menu and when you try to resume it, It gets an "Illegal Copy" message.

== Gameplay ==
The goal is to rescue a certain number of civilians, by navigating across a wide range of obstacles in 34 levels. Each rescue is done against the time limit. In case the player is unable to reach the target on time, the mutating effects of The Flea's poison will take hold and the civilian will be turned into an insect. Once that person is rescued, the perspective of the level will flip around and Banzai must make it back save a human who's now on the opposite side. There are power-ups like slow-motion for more precise jumps, or mega-leaps for avoiding dangerous situations. Collecting mutagens will allow the player to continue the game after running out of lives.

== Reception ==
The game has a Metacritic score of 84% based on 6 critic reviews.
