= Thumb Drift =

2016 video game

- App icon
- Developer: SMG Studio
- Publisher: SMG Studio
- Platforms: iOS, Android, tvOS
- Release: iOS; February 18, 2016; Android; March 2, 2016; tvOS; September 19, 2016
- Genre: Action
- Mode: Single-player

Thumb Drift is a 2016 action game developed and published by the Australian indie studio SMG Studio. In the game, the player has to control a car to avoid hitting obstacles or the edge of the track using their thumb. It was released for iOS on February 18, 2016, followed by a port for Android in March 2016 and tvOS in September 2016.

== Gameplay ==
The gameplay consists of the player drifting a car along different tracks. This is done by the player dragging their finger left or right causing the back of the car to move in that direction. There are coins on the track which the player can collect. These coins can be spent on buying new cars for the player to play the game with. If the player collides with the edge of the track or an obstacle the game is over.

== Development and release ==
Thumb Drift was developed by the Australian indie studio SMG Studio, who previously produced games such as One More Line and One More Bounce.

A game demo of Thumb Drift was shown at PAX Prime 2015, and the game was released for iOS on February 18, 2016. A port for Android was released on March 2, 2016, followed by tvOS on September 19, 2016, under the name Thumb Drift GT-V.

== Reception ==
Reception

Aggregate score
Aggregator	Score
Metacritic	79/100

Review scores
Publication	Score
Gamezebo	80/100
Pocket Gamer	3.5/5
TouchArcade	4.5/5

The game was praised by multiple publications. On Metacritic, the game has a "generally favorable" score of 79 based on four critics.
