= Merge Magic! =

2019 video game

Merge Magic
- Developer(s): Gram Games
- Publisher(s): Gram Games
- Platform(s): Android, iOS
- Release: September 18, 2019
- Genre(s): Puzzle adventure
- Mode(s): Single-player

Merge Magic! is a 2019 puzzle adventure game developed and published by Gram Games. The game was released for Android and iOS on September 18, 2019.

== Gameplay ==
Limited-time events are hosted.

== Release ==
Merge Magic! was released on September 18, 2019, for Android and iOS.
