= Octagon (video game) =

2013 video game

- App icon
- Developer(s): Lukas Korba
- Publisher(s): Lukas Korba
- Programmer(s): Vladimir Hrincar; Lukas Korba
- Composer(s): Jaroslav Beck
- Platform(s): iOS, Android
- Release: iOS; November 7, 2013; Android; September 2014
- Genre(s): Action
- Mode(s): Single-player

Octagon is a 2013 action game developed and published by the Czech indie developer Lukas Korba. In the game, the player must guide an octagon through randomly generated eight-sided levels. Octagon was released for iOS in November 2013, followed by Android in September 2014, and was met with a positive reception.

== Gameplay ==
In Octagon, the player must guide an octagon through eight-sided, three-dimensional levels without falling. Each level is randomly generated, and to complete one, the player can move the octagon left or right or flip its gravity to land on a platform directly above it.

== Release ==
Octagon was released for iOS on November 7, 2013. An endless mode was added to the game in December 2013, and Octagon was released for Android devices in September 2014. A sequel titled Extreme Evolution was released on May 6, 2020.

== Reception ==
Publications praised Octagon for its gameplay. Critics praised the game's fixed layout, comparing Octagon to Super Hexagon and Boson X; however, some voiced concerns on the game's flipping controls.
