= Dream of Pixels =

2012 video game

- Developer(s): Dawn of Play
- Publisher(s): Dawn of Play (Note: Published to Android by Noodlecake Studios)
- Platform(s): iOS; Android
- Release: iOS; November 14, 2012; Android; October 17, 2013
- Genre(s): Puzzle
- Mode(s): Single-player

Dream of Pixels is a 2012 puzzle game developed by the Slovenian studio Dawn of Play. It was released in November 2012 for iOS, with a subsequent version published by Noodlecake Studios for Android in October 2013. The game was positively received.

== Gameplay ==
In Dream of Pixels, the player must tap a tetromino to clear a row. The game was released for iOS on November 14, 2012, and for Android on October 17, 2013.

== Reception ==
Reception

Aggregate score
Aggregator	Score
Metacritic	86/100

Review scores
Publication	Score
Pocket Gamer	4/5
TouchArcade	4.5/5
AppSpy	4/5
Slide to Play	4/4

On Metacritic, the game has a "generally favorable" score of 86 based on eight critics.

The game was well received.
