= Micro Miners =

2012 mobile video game

- Developer: BonusLevel.org
- Publisher: BonusLevel.org
- Platforms: iOS, Android
- Release: November 15, 2012
- Genre: Puzzle

Micro Miners is an iOS puzzle game developed by French studio BonusLevel.org and released on November 15, 2012.

== Gameplay ==
In each level players use their fingers to create mine tunnels beneath the earth for the miner characters to go and find minerals such as gold and silver. Lava, acid, and granite and opposing threats.

== Critical reception ==
The game has a rating of 85% based on 6 critic reviews.

Pocket Gamer UK said " A brilliant and original game that tests your dexterity and your brain power, Micro Miners deserves your attention." TouchGen wrote "Micro Miners is one of the biggest surprises of the year that came out of nowhere. Unique intensely satisfying gameplay paired with a cool presentation makes it one of those games that should be part of all iOS collections." TouchArcade said 'This not your average, micro-stage mobile game. Thankfully, only a handful of stages made me wish there were checkpoints." 148Apps said "It's a fantastic realization and adaptation of his original "sketch." This is an iOS game worth talking about, and very much worth owning. I'll be buying my own copy once it's released, that's for certain." Modojo described it as " An immensely charming, clever and (despite the obvious influence of Lemmings) original game. Neat mechanics, simplistic yet pretty artwork and a fine, stirring chiptune make this a very easy recommendation for fans of puzzle and platform games alike." Gamezebo wrote "As you may have surmised, Micro Miners is not a game for those who frustrate easily -- Simple controls or not, it's one tough cookie. For those in the market for a mobile game with a bit of a kick, though, it ought to scratch that itch just fine."
