= Bring me Sandwiches!! =

2011 video game

- App icon
- Developer: Grumpyface Studios
- Publisher: Adult Swim Games
- Director: Chris Graham
- Platform: iOS
- Release: October 20, 2011
- Genre: Puzzle-platform
- Mode: Single-player

Bring me Sandwiches!! is a 2011 puzzle-platform game developed by Grumpyface Studios and published by Adult Swim Games for iOS. It was released on the iTunes Store on October 20, 2011, before being delisted on September 19, 2017.

Designed as part of an initiative to bring exclusive indie games to iOS, the game makes use of touch and/or tilt controls in sidescrolling levels where a fast food employee is tasked with assembling sandwiches to satisfy a giant alien threatening to destroy Earth, with gameplay focused on collecting increasingly large objects as toppings across cuisine-themed levels.

== Gameplay ==
The plot follows fast food employee Jimmy Nugget being tasked by the president of the United States to fulfil the wishes of a giant alien named Invader Gourmo, which threatens to destroy Earth unless his demands for specific sandwiches are met. The player must traverse through 25 levels themed after the cuisines of different countries, with the goal of each being to find, pick up and carry sandwiches with specific toppings to one of Gourmo's minions. These toppings consist of a variety of cartoony elements. The size of the sandwich bread gradually increases with each checkpoint, enabling the player to pick up increasingly large objects, going from small food items to buildings or other parts of the landscape.

== Development and release ==
Intro cinematic storyboard sample

Bring me Sandwiches!! was first revealed on September 16, 2011, as part of Adult Swim Digital's initiative to further its partnerships with independent game studios to bring exclusive games to iOS. Chris Graham of Grumpyface Studios described the development process as allowing "for a nice creative freedom you don't always expect when working with a publisher".
On December 20, 2011, update 1.1 added iPad support with specially formatted HD graphics.
On April 22, 2015, the game was updated to support iPhone 5/6/6 Plus resolutions. This update also shifted the game to a free-to-play model, with ads being occasionally shown in-between levels.

The game was delisted from the AppStore following the release of iOS 11 on September 19, 2017, which removed support for 32-bit applications.

== Reception ==
Reception

Aggregate score
Aggregator	Score
Metacritic	82/100

Review scores
Publication	Score
Edge	8/10
IGN	7/10
Pocket Gamer	4/5
TouchArcade	5/5

The game received "generally favorable" reviews according to the review aggregation website Metacritic.

Critics generally noted gameplay similarities to Bandai Namco's Katamari series of video games, while praising its unique art direction and amount of content considering its price tag. Criticism was directed at the length of the game's load times as well as its lack of gameplay variety.
