= Qvoid =

2011 video game

- Developer(s): Gavina Games
- Platform(s): iOS, Android
- Release: July 21, 2011

Qvoid is an iOS game developed by Spanish studio Gavina Games and released on July 21, 2011.

== Critical reception ==
The game received universal acclaim, garnering a rating of 90% on Metacritic based on 4 critic reviews.

AppSpy wrote " With nothing more than a cube, some colored squares and a 3D world, Qvoid presents players with a charmingly simple, yet dastardly puzzle challenge that sinks its teeth in to you from the outset. " AppSmile said " The game's Retina Display 3D graphics are clean and clear, and the smallish level sizes allow for a tightly pulled-in view. Colors are easily distinguishable and animations are fluid. " 148Apps wrote " Qvoid is an inventive puzzle game with beautiful graphics and a steady learning curve. The challenges are engrossing and complex enough to be entertaining without overly frustrating. " AppSafari said " Qvoid is a simple game that packs quite a challenge. It's great for a two-minute distraction, or as a lengthy challenge. "
