= Kazooloo =

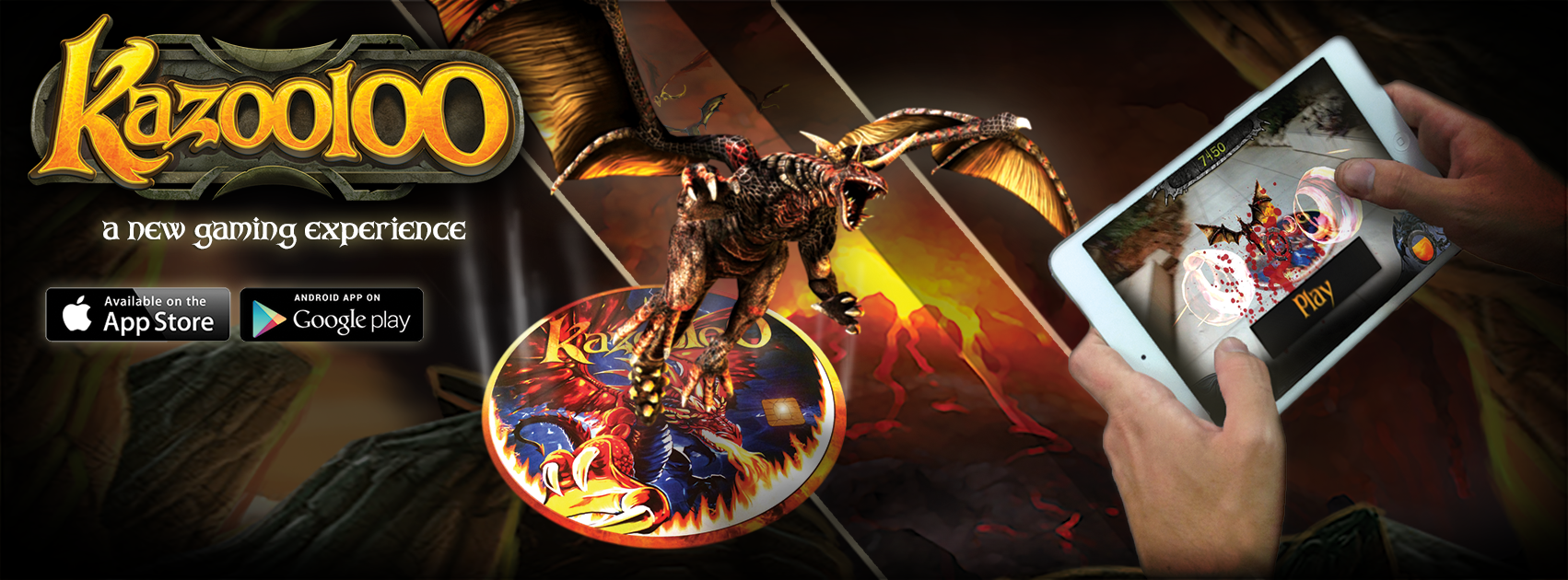
- Developer: Unlimited Reality
- Publisher: Unlimited Reality
- Platforms: Android, iOS
- Release: 4 April 2014: Vortex 4 April 2014; Dark Metal X 29 April 2016
- Genre: Action
- Modes: Single-player, multiplayer

Kazooloo is an augmented reality video game powered by a mobile app and a physical game board. The game was developed by American indie studio Unlimited Reality and released in iOS and Android platforms in 2014. A sequel of the game called Kazooloo DMX was launched in 2016.

Unlike most mobile games in the market that encourage players to sit down and be static, the Kazooloo game requires the player to move constantly around the board to avoid enemies' shots. Kazooloo is being presented at Hamleys and Harrods.

== Gameplay ==
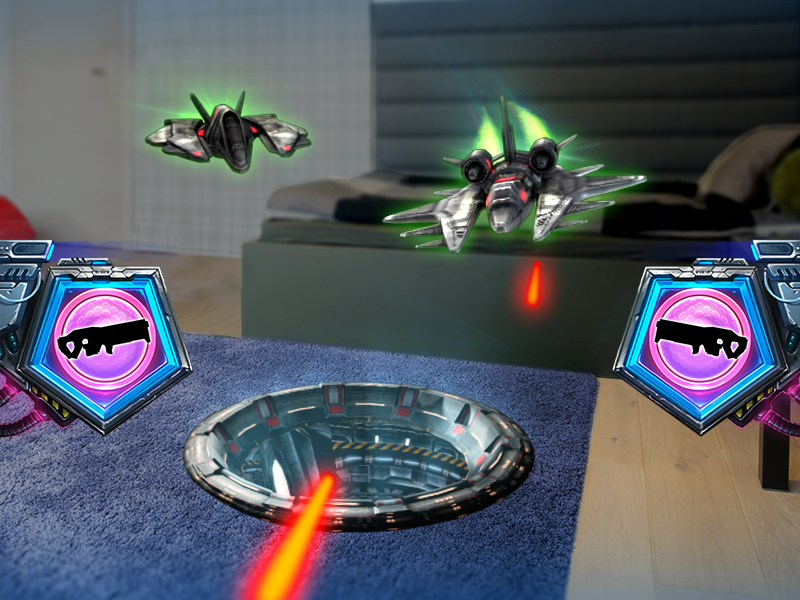
Kazooloo DMX: screen shot

Kazooloo is a first-person shooter in AR. The player's objective is to shoot enemies coming from the Kazooloo dimensions into their real life surroundings, and dodge enemy attack by physically moving around the game board. Every level of the game has different creatures to fight. As the player progresses, enemies become more difficult to defeat and require more movement of the player.
