= Spinzizzle =

2010 video game

- Developer: PressOK Entertainment
- Platforms: iOS, Android
- Release: May 21, 2010

Spinzizzle is an iOS game developed by American studio PressOK Entertainment and released on May 21, 2010.

== Reception ==
The game has received "generally favorable reviews" on Metacritic, garnering a score of 84% based on 6 critic reviews.

SlideToPlay said "The name's pretty silly, but underneath it is an incredibly good Match-3 game." AppSpy wrote "Spinzizzle is a great addition to anyone's casual collection of three-match puzzlers, with its slick presentation and broadly appealing simple gameplay." GamePro said "It has a terrible name, but Spinzizzle is a surprisingly fun game." Pocket Gamer UK wrote "While the prospect of matching three of more balls isn't going to win any awards, Spinzizzle is delightfully original and represents an interesting, highly playable spin on the genre." IGN said "Spinzizzle is a cool riff on the established formula that will keep you hooked for days." TouchArcade wrote "I've been having a lot of fun with Spinzizzle, largely in part because it's often entirely possible to clear the entire game board at once, and figuring out how to do that is a really good time if you're a puzzle game perfectionist."
