= Choro 2021 =

2021 Venezuelan mobile game

- Developer: Carl Zitelmann
- Platforms: Android, iOS
- Release: 5 December 2021
- Genres: Action, adventure
- Mode: Single-player

Gameplay screenshot.

Choro 2021 is a mobile video game released for Android and iOS on 5 December 2021. The game follows a cowboy in a dystopian Venezuela who has to fight malandros, soldiers, zombies and witches, while finding references of the country, such as an empanada, a Toronto or a Riko Malt. In the first released level, the protagonist has to cross Mission Zamora and fight the witch Bruja Maruja. It was developed by Venezuelan filmmaker Carl Zitelmann and based in an homonymous novel, Choro 2021 is an action and adventure metroidvania, with a design similar to Contra, Mega Man, Castlevania and Ninja Gaiden.

== See also ==
- Venezolario
