= Slydris =

2012 video game

- App icon
- Developer: Radiangames
- Publisher: Radiangames
- Engine: Unity
- Platforms: iOS, Android
- Release: iOS; July 26, 2012; Android; June 6, 2013
- Genre: Puzzle
- Mode: Single-player

Slydris is a 2012 puzzle game developed and published by the American indie studio Radiangames. It was released in July 2012 for iOS, followed by a port for Android in June 2013. The game was met with a positive reception.

== Gameplay ==
In Slydris, the player has to manipulate shapes into an entire line of the same color. Once finished, the line will disappear, and the player will earn points.

== Release ==
Slydris was released for iOS on July 26, 2012, followed by a port for Android on June 7, 2013.

== Reception ==
On Metacritic, the game has a "generally favorable" score of 86% based on eight critics.

Multiple critics praised the game.
