= Score! Classic Goals =

2012 video game

- Developer(s): First Touch Games
- Publisher(s): First Touch Games
- Platform(s): iOS, Android
- Release: May 17, 2012
- Genre(s): Soccer/Puzzle

Score! Classic Goals is an iOS football-themed puzzle game, developed by British studio First Touch Games and released on May 17, 2012.

== Gameplay ==
Players attempt to replicate classic goals from the past 40 years by using their finger to manipulate the players and the ball.

== Critical reception ==
The game has a Metacritic score of 86% based on eight critic reviews.

- AppSpy said " For fans of football and those looking for a fun time waster, Score! Classic Goals draws you in with its simplicity and soon catches you within the atmosphere and excitement of some of the sport's most famous goals".
- PocletGamerUK wrote "Score! Classic Goals is a fantastic idea, executed marvellously. Why did no one think of this sooner? "
- TouchArcade said "A must-own, Score! Classic Goals is a love letter to the game of soccer".
- 148Apps said "Essentially, it's a soccer themed puzzle game. Figuring out the best route to take and lining up shots just right is the focus here. While it's not possible to deviate from the original plan, there are still some important physics to take into account. Unlocking Pro mode reinforces this as it takes line drawing speed into account which can change everything".
- TouchGen said "Score! Classic Goals is one of those games that I want everyone to try no matter if you are diehard soccer fan, or just a gamer. Sure those haters out there won't like it, but I wouldn't want them near this game either, as they would soil it with negativity".
- Multiplayer.it said "Score! Classic Goals is an original and enjoyable take on the football genre that fails to be really great due to a strong repetitiveness and some issues in game design".
- VideoGamer wrote "The game's excellent presentation - it's got a vibe of one of those football magazines your friends (or even you, perhaps) used to buy when you were a kid - and responsive, tactile nature make playing it a simple, punchy delight. I might have no idea what constitutes a classic goal, but it's impossible not to notice that Score! is a quality game".
