= Venezolario =

2025 Venezuelan mobile game

- Developer(s): Ronald Kanzler
- Platform(s): Android, iOS
- Release: 12 July 2025
- Genre(s): Word game
- Mode(s): Single-player

Venezolario is a mobile word game developed and published by siblings Ronald and Katty Kanzler for Android and iOS. The app was launched on 12 July 2025, and in it players must guess Venezuelan colloquial words and phrases.

== Gameplay ==
In the app, players must guess Venezuelan colloquial words and phrases using clues from categories such as food or music, and they progress through levels by acquiring Venezuelan symbols such as arepas, chicha, or charrascas. Venezolario includes regional vocabulary, such as from the western region and Zulia, and features collectible cards with expressions, characters, cuisine, and traditional symbols, weekly tournaments where players compete, and achievements for reaching specific goals.

== Production ==
The game was developed by Katty and Ronald Kanzler siblings, descendants of Germans who settled in the Colonia Tovar. Kathy has stated that despite their ties to German culture, she and her brother have a strong connection to Venezuelan customs, which motivated them to develop the app.

== Reception ==
Days after its launch, the game reached the top spot in downloads in Venezuela on both the Play Store and the App Store, as well as a significant number of downloads in cities with a Venezuelan diaspora presence, such as Madrid, Porto, Buenos Aires, and Santiago de Chile. The app's popularity has been promoted on social media, including TikTok.

== See also ==
- Choro 2021
- Venezuelan Spanish
