= Kitten Sanctuary =

2012 puzzle video game

- Developer: Clockwork Pixels
- Platforms: iOS, Android, Windows, macOS
- Release: 27 March 2012

Kitten Sanctuary is the first iOS game of British indie developer Clockwork Pixels, and was released on 27 March 2012.

== Critical reception ==
The game has a Metacritic score of 85% based on 4 critic reviews.

SlideToPlay wrote "Not every game needs to be about guns or swords, and Kitten Sanctuary is a great alternative to the violence that computer games are often associated with." TouchArcade wrote "Kitten Sanctuary is a very sweet game, but beyond that it's well-crafted, and the attention to detail shows. " AppSpy said "While this is definitely aimed at younger players and lovers of all things kitten, the match three is fun and you definitely get your share of virtual pets." 148Apps said "Kitten Sanctuary doesn't reinvent the cheese wheel here (sorry), but the game successfully blends classic genres in an unexpected way that kept me playing far longer than I anticipated. It's a solid pick-up for casual gamers and cat ladies alike."
