= Crash Club =

2017 video game

- Developer: Prettygreat
- Publisher: Prettygreat
- Platforms: iOS, Android
- Release: May 10, 2017
- Genre: Massively multiplayer online game
- Mode: Multiplayer

Crash Club was a 2017 massively multiplayer online game developed and published by the Australian indie studio Prettygreat. The game was released on May 10, 2017, for Android and iOS devices and has garnered a mixed reception.

== Gameplay ==
Crash Club is a massively multiplayer online game. Players race around a large city that houses several houses, a lighthouse, beaches, a satellite dish, various coffee shops, a gas station, water tower, and a metal crane. The objective is to work your way up the leaderboard by hitting everything in sight to obtain points while avoiding and attacking other vehicles that do the same. As players do this, they earn experience points and gold coins. They also have a chance to uncover one of five gems.

As players hit structures, they can get up to five tokens, which can be used to obtain weapons, upgrades, and power-ups by entering "Stop-N-Go" buildings scattered around the map. Once the player reaches the top of the leaderboard, their vehicle turns into a monster truck. Smashing into objects while driving the truck results provides double the number of points. Alternatively, they can wreck opponents' vehicles using several weapons including Peashooters, Blasters, Rockets, Zap Cannons, and Galaxy Guns. Players are also equipped with up to three turbos, which they can use to escape danger. A player is eliminated if their vehicle is destroyed.

Before each game, players can upgrade their vehicles, sell, or customize them with a variety of paints, decals, wheels, antennas, and horns. They also have an opportunity to get three tokens or activate a shield, with the latter requiring them to watch an advertisement.

== Development and release ==
Crash Club was developed by Prettygreat, an Australian indie game studio who previously created games such as Land Sliders and Slide the Shakes. The game was released on May 10, 2017, for Android and iOS devices, receiving one million downloads within its first week of release. In June 2017, an update to Crash Club added new vehicles, another playing area, and a weapon called the Galaxy Gun, along with other gameplay modes such as tournaments, events, and weekly challenges. In October 2017, a Halloween update to Crash Club added new antennas, horns, and wheels under the new perk "Halloween".

== Removal and shutdown ==
However, on December 15, 2018, Prettygreat may have been acquired by Snapchat for around $8.6 million, resulting in the removal and shutdown of Crash Club and other games made by Prettygreat from the App Store on iOS and Play Store on Android.

== Reception ==
Reception

Review scores
| Publication | Score |
|---|---|
| Gamezebo | 60/100 |
| 148Apps | 3.5/5 |
| Multiplayer.it | 6.5/10 |

Multiple publications praised the game.
