= Aglet (video game) =

2020 video game

- Developer: onlife Inc.
- Publisher: onlife Inc.
- Platforms: iOS, Android
- Release: April 11, 2020
- Genres: Augmented reality, location-based game

Aglet is a 2020 augmented reality mobile game, developed and published by onlife Inc. Similar to Pokémon Go, it encourages players to spend time outside in order to earn rewards. Developed by onlife co-founders CEO Ryan David Mullins and Owen Batt, Aglet was released in April 2020.

== Gameplay ==
Aglet is a free-to-play augmented reality mobile game. By walking or running around the physical world, players are rewarded with Aglet that they can then use to collect digital sneakers. As sneakers are collected, they can be equipped to provide the wearer with different attributes and abilities as they explore the world. Actively worn sneakers wear out over time, but players can check in to "repair" or "deadstock" stations in their area to repair their sneakers and return them to looking new. Players can display any sneakers they aren't actively wearing on their Shelf.

Players can also complete location-based challenges by walking or running through their real-life surroundings. While exploring, players can find Treasure Stashes that contain sneakers and in-game currency.

Aglet debuted its first NFT-based features in early 2022. These in-game features were followed in May 2022 by the launch of the Aglet One, a real-life sneaker paired with a corresponding NFT. Currency earned in-game can be used to purchase Aglet's NFTs.

== Development ==
=== Release ===
As reported by VentureBeat, Aglet reached 3.5 million active users as of July 2022.

== Collaborations ==
=== Collaboration with Manchester City x PUMA ===
As part of the Club's 2023 pre-season tour of Japan and Korea, the interactive experience available on the Aglet app encouraged fans to get moving and collect Manchester City and PUMA virtual items for their avatars. For fans in Japan and Korea, visiting specific locations in Tokyo and Seoul, unlocked Manchester City and PUMA stashes containing a selection of virtual merchandise.

=== Creators Month Collaboration with LØCI ===
During Aglet's 2022 Creators Month, Aglet players were invited to submit their own designs for the LØCI Ten and the LØCI Seven silhouettes. The winner of the competition, worked with LØCI to design and release the LØCI Seven ‘Pyonkiti’ as a digital asset and a physical sneaker.

== Reception ==
=== Awards ===
Aglet Awards and Accolades
Year	Award	Nomination Category	Result
2021	LVMH Innovation Award	Media & Brand Awareness	Won
