= Desert Fox: The Battle of El Alamein =

2014 video game

- Developer: Shenandoah Studio
- Publisher: Shenandoah Studio
- Platform: iOS
- Release: June 26, 2014
- Genre: Turn-based strategy

Desert Fox: The Battle of El Alamein is an iOS game developed by American indie studio Shenandoah Studio and released on June 26, 2014.

== Critical reception ==
The game has a Metacritic score of 84% based on 6 critic reviews.

4Players.de said "This is like chess in open terrain. Turn based tacticians: Get ready to celebrate. Shenandoah Studios reached a level that reminds me of the quality of Ensemble Studios on PC." Digitally Downloaded wrote "There's no real criticism that can be levelled at this game. It's niche, but in servicing that niche Desert Fox combines a near-perfect AI with a brilliant interface and the perfect historical battle to serve as the basis of the game. Serious strategy fans couldn't ask for much more." TouchArcade said "If you're coming into the series fresh right now, I think I would probably recommend Battle of the Bulge ahead of this game. If you enjoy that game's mechanics and are looking for a different scenario, Desert Fox is more than worth your time and money."

Pocket Gamer UK said "An incredibly polished, riveting, and accessible strategy game, but veterans of the series might find it a little over-familiar." Eurogamer wrote "What the game lacks in size, it makes up for in polish and poise. 148Apps wrote "Yet another excellent entry from Shenandoah Studio, Desert Fox: The Battle of El Alamein may be priced a bit steep, but it's a well-executed package that functions as both entertainment and interactive history lesson."
