= VS. Racing 2 =

2012 video game

- Developer: Maciek Drejak Labs
- Publisher: Maciek Drejak Labs
- Platform: iOS
- Release: September 6, 2012
- Genre: Racing
- Modes: Single-player, multiplayer

VS. Racing 2 is a racing video game for the iOS platform. The game was developed and released by Maciek Drejak Labs on September 6, 2012. It is the sequel to the original VS. Racing, which was released by the same development team on the same platform in 2011. The game was generally well-received, with critics praising the simple but solid gameplay, but criticizing the lack of content in its initial release prior to updates.

== Gameplay ==
VS. Racing 2 features simple, arcade-like gameplay mechanics. The game is played from a top-down perspective similar to the Micro Machines video games. The player must direct their car through a themed race course faster than competing cars. Cars are controlled by a steering wheel placed in the bottom corner of the touchscreen of the given iOS device; touching in a given direction moves the car in the same direction, and not holding any direction applies the brakes.

Winning races, or certain acts, such as passing or running into other racers, earns the player in-game currency, which can be spent on buying new cars, upgrading cars, or making aesthetic changes to cars. A zero to three star ranking based on the quality of the driver's racing also affects the amount of money won. Additionally, the player may opt to use in-app purchases to use real-life currency to purchase more in-game currency.

== Development ==
The game was developed by the same development team that had released the original VS. Racing for iOS in 2011, which itself had accumulated over 1 million downloads. VS. Racing 2 was initially released at a $0.99 price point at its release on September 6, 2012, but was later switched to a free-to-play pricing model in June 2013.

== Reception ==
The game was generally well received. Review aggregator Metacritic gave the game a score of 75/100, based on 6 critics reviews. Pocket Gamer praised the game for evenly balanced artificial intelligence for the computer-controlled competitors, and concluding that the game was a "polished, incredibly enjoyable high-speed blast". Slide to Play gave the game a 3 out of 4 rating, praising the game for being fun despite its simplicity, stating "While all of this might sound boring or too simple, it never feels that way. The game plays like a retro arcade racer, with a focus on the actual racing."

Touch Arcade was a little more critical of the game, stating "'A little light' is probably the best way to describe Vs Racing 2...As far as being an arcade racer, the experience is about as smooth as one can expect for a game that focuses more on fundamentals. However, improvements over the original feel relatively minor, and the missing online multiplayer means Vs Racing 2 lacks that big ticket feature that sequels usually try and include. Still, it's an enjoyable arcade racer".
