= Retro Bowl =

2020 video game

- The app icon of Retro Bowl
- Developer: New Star Games
- Publisher: New Star Games
- Platforms: Nintendo Switch; iOS; Android; web browser
- Release: Android, iOS; January 2020; Nintendo Switch; February 10, 2022
- Genre: Sports
- Mode: Single-player

Retro Bowl is a 8-bit styled American football video game developed by New Star Games for the iOS, Android, and Nintendo Switch operating systems. A browser version is also officially available on the websites Poki and Kongregate. The game was released in January 2020, and due to many YouTube creators such as JefeZhai, HostileBeast, and RetroSportRadio, it saw a significant rise in popularity later that year. A version for the Nintendo Switch was released on February 10, 2022.

Retro Bowl was heavily influenced by the Tecmo Bowl series. The game was the number-one-downloaded-app on Apple's App Store in late 2021. After the success of Retro Bowl, the developers released the soccer game Retro Goal in June 2021. Retro Bowl uses simple mechanics which have been praised by players and critics alike.

== Gameplay ==
Retro Bowl emulates the gameplay of American football and was heavily influenced by the Tecmo Bowl series. In Retro Bowl, the player controls the team's offense while also acting as the team's general manager. Even though the player can draft defensive players or get defensive players from free agency, the defense is not playable, and is simulated by the game. The goal of the game is for the player to manage their team to the Retro Bowl championship game (A spin-off of the Super Bowl). The game also includes aspects of managing an American football team such as trading and cutting players, signing free agents, maintaining morale, drafting players, talking to the press, and more. There is also an "unlimited version" which gives access to editing any team's uniforms, logos, names and end zones, weather, and more. The player can also buy Retro Bowl's currency called coaching credits, which can also be earned by gameplay (playing games) and decisions outside of the game. All teams are spin-offs of their NFL counterparts.

In April 2022, an update was released that introduced the ability to return kickoffs.

In October 2022, another update to the game was released where it was made possible to simulate games and be able to change avatars for players and staff with unlimited version for $1.

In February 2023, another update to the game was released where Retro Bowl added a new mode called "Exhibition Mode" to allow players to pick 2 of any of the 32 NFL teams and play a game whether against the CPU or with a friend.

On June 23, 2023, Retro Bowl+ was released on Apple Arcade as the base game with the unlimited version at no extra cost.

== Reception ==
Reception

Aggregate scores
Aggregator	Score
Metacritic	NS: 84/100
OpenCritic	100% recommend

Review scores
Publication	Score
Nintendo Life	9/10
Pocket Gamer	4/5

Retro Bowl received "generally favorable" reviews according to review aggregator Metacritic. Fellow review aggregator OpenCritic assessed that the game received "mighty" approval, being recommended by 100% of critics.

Nintendo Life gave the game 9/10, praising the simple mechanics and retro feel of the game but criticized the game's amount of fumbles.

== Spin-offs ==
On July 9, 2021, Retro Goal, was released, an association football spin-off game.

On September 18, 2023, Retro Bowl College (iPhone app name shown as just RB College) was released, a college football spin-off game. Gameplay mechanics remained similar to its predecessor, however, changes were made to team management to accommodate the team building of college football, such as players graduating to leave for the "pro draft" and having a scholarship fund instead of a salary cap. Similar to Retro Bowl, Retro Bowl College does not feature team licenses, however, the game includes likenesses for 250 teams in both the FBS and FCS levels. The game also includes conference and bowl games, and a version of the College Football Playoff.

On September 5, 2024, NFL Retro Bowl '25 was released on Apple Arcade, featuring teams officially licensed through the NFL and the NFL Players Association.
