= Sneaky Sneaky =

2014 video game

- Publisher: Naiad Entertainment
- Platforms: iOS; Microsoft Windows; OS X Android
- Release: Windows, OS X: WW: November 12, 2014; Android, iOS: WW: December 10, 2014
- Genres: Stealth, adventure
- Mode: Single-player

Sneaky Sneaky is a stealth video game for Android, iOS, OS X, and Microsoft Windows. The Steam version of the game was released by Naiad Entertainment on November 12, 2014, and the mobile version was released on December 10. The game relies heavily on stealth, so the player must avoid enemies in order to pass some levels, although normal combat can also be used.

The game follows the adventures of the player character Sneaky, a thief. His goal is to escape from prison, avoid enemies and steal rubies in the process. The player is generally encouraged to avoid the guards, but various weapons can be unlocked for Sneaky's use. The iOS version of Sneaky Sneaky received generally positive feedback from critics. It was praised for its battle system. The PC version, on the other hand, received more mixed reviews.

== Plot ==
In the game, the player controls a hooded thief known as Sneaky. After being sent to prison, the game shows a brief cut scene of him sneaking out of prison, avoiding the guards, and stealing rubies. However, a bird appears, taking the gems and throwing them across the kingdom. The game follows Sneaky's attempt to recover the gems, whilst still avoiding enemies.

== Gameplay ==
Throughout the levels, the aim is to avoid an encounter with any enemies, and complete the level by grabbing the golden key inside one of the rooms and then leaving back through the entrance again. However, if Sneaky is spotted by the guards, a turn-based battle occurs. The player also has an option to start the fight with the guards, by having Sneaky attack them with his knife. The character who initiated the battle has the first turn.

The player hides behind a haystack as a guard stands nearby.

Throughout the game, the player can unlock different weapons and tools for use during the levels. These include an axe, a bow, and a hammer. The arrow is used for ranged attacks, whereas the sword can be used for melee attacks. The hammer is for breaking rocks and the axe is for cutting down trees. In addition, special attacks can also be used.

At the end of each level, the player is granted a specific amount of XP. This is based on how many enemies the player killed during the level, as well as how the kills were made. XP in the game can be used to purchase upgrades to Sneaky's statistics, which are health, movement and damage. In addition to this, rubies and pots are scattered throughout the various levels. Rubies cannot be used for any purpose, but pots can be broken open, yielding arrows for the bow, and gold coins, which can be used as currency to purchase weapons and other types of gear.

In addition, powerups can be found throughout the levels. For example, the monster bait is a powerup which allows the player to lure enemies and control them with the aroma of the bait. Another example is a powerup known as "moving cover", which allows the player to camouflage and hide in the environment in order to avoid guards who walk past.

== Reception ==
Reception

Aggregate score
Aggregator	Score		
Aggregator	iOS	Macintosh	PC
Metacritic	82/100	N/A	63/100

Review scores
Publication	Score		
Publication	iOS	Macintosh	PC
Destructoid	N/A	N/A	5/10
Gamezebo	90/100	N/A	N/A
GameZone	N/A	N/A	7/10
Jeuxvideo.com	14/20	14/20	14/20
Pocket Gamer	4.5/5	N/A	N/A
TouchArcade	4.5/5	N/A	N/A
VentureBeat	73/100	N/A	N/A
National Post	7.5/10	N/A	N/A

Award
Publication	Award
TouchArcade	Game of the Week

The iOS version received "generally favorable" reviews according to the review aggregation website Metacritic. Overall, it was praised for its combat system, and the way that it handles turn-based battles. Critics were also generally impressed by the puzzles, and the cartoon-like graphics. The game was named TouchArcade's game of the week, and was an entrant in the 2014 Independent Games Festival Awards. However, the game's reception wasn't all positive, with VentureBeat criticizing the game's controls for being too difficult to use.

The PC version received "mixed or average" reviews according to Metacritic. It was criticized for its lack of length. Brian Connor of COGconnected dubbed it "an experience better suited for mobile gaming", although he also called it "a fun little time waster" after considering the price. Hooked Gamers was unimpressed by the controls, as the player is forced to use a mouse.
