= Pillowfight Girls =

2010 video game

- Developer: I-Play
- Publisher: I-Play
- Platform: iOS
- Release: May 22, 2010

Pillowfight Girls is an iOS game developed by American studio I-Play which was released on May 22, 2010.

== Reception ==
The game received very negative reviews, garnering a Metacritic score of 33% based on four critic reviews.

Pocket Gamer UK wrote "Neither a fun trashy experience or a enjoyable casual game, Pillowfight Girls is a failure on many levels", and Appspy said "Can you believe this is "Episode 1" in a potential series of games? With any luck if future games in the Pillowfight Girls series are released they'll take more care to make things genuinely sexy instead of tweenager's fever fantasy". IGN wrote "Even the threadbare appeal of hot chicks in little clothes is botched, as these plastic maidens look as dead-eyed as blow-up dolls", and Modojo said "Missing personality is bad enough, but terrible gameplay is even worse".

The Gamers's Temple wrote "This is a very bad game. So bad that it passed that point of being an amusingly bad game and just went right to being nothing more than a bad game. I hate it", and Croyden Guardian said "It doesn't take itself seriously and provides some amusement for about five minutes or so, but that's about it". TechnologyTell wrote "I know I sound like I'm being ironic here, but I really wish the developers, with this wonderfully absurd premise as a vehicle, had put the pedal to the floor and gunned it off the ramp (creatively speaking), either in terms of working out some insane backstory for the game, or in giving the fighters some differences beyond how they displayed their pulchritude".

WatchOkayRead wrote "The game is, for the lack of a better term, what you'd expect from it being a $1 fighting game: it's simple, easy to pick up, the AI isn't terribly challenging, and best of all there's at least more than 2 characters to select from while playing, there's six of them to be exact", while ThisIsLocalLondon said "I-play has released some excellent games into the App Store for iPhone and iPod Touch, including Pool Star and Red Bull X-Fighters. Unfortunately, Pillowfight Girls isn't among them and is a poor effort". Destructoid wrote sarcastically "Massive jugs and rampant chauvinism. That's what the iPhone was made for, folks!".
