= A Ride into the Mountains =

2013 video game

- App icon
- Developer: Sunhead Games
- Publisher: Sunhead Games
- Platforms: iOS, Android, Ouya
- Release: July 23, 2013
- Genre: Action
- Mode: Single-player

A Ride into the Mountains is a 2013 action game developed and published by the Taiwanese studio Sunhead Games. It was released for iOS and Android on July 23, 2013. The game was met with a mostly positive reception.

== Gameplay ==
The player controls an archer named Zu, who rides a horse through the mountains. To attack incoming enemies, the player must shoot arrows.

== Development and release ==
A Ride into the Mountains was developed by the Taiwanese studio Sunhead Games, a two-person team from Taipei, Taiwan, consisting of Lee Kuo and Chia-Yu Chen. The pair combined their contrasting interests in video games; while Lee Kuo had an affinity for artistic games, Chia-Yu preferred fast-paced action games. The developers cited "Pixel of the Colossus", a pixel art painting created by Darwin Yamamoto, and Taiwanese aboriginal outfits as design inspirations for the main character Zu. Tilt controls were chosen to make the player feel like they were riding a horse. A Ride into the Mountains was released for the App Store on July 23, 2013.

== Reception ==
Reception

Aggregate score
Aggregator	Score
Metacritic	80/100

Review scores
Publication	Score
CNET Gamecenter	8.1/10
Gamezebo	100/100
MacLife	4.5/5
Pocket Gamer	3.5/5
TouchArcade	4.5/5
AppSpy	Average

The game has a "generally favorable" rating on Metacritic. The game was praised.

A Ride into the Mountains was considered as one of the best Ouya games by Gamezebo.
