= Darklings =

2013 video game

- Developer: MildMania
- Platforms: iOS; Windows Phone
- Release: November 27, 2013

Darklings is an iOS and Windows Phone video game developed by Turkish studio MildMania and released on November 27, 2013.

== Gameplay ==
Visually similar to Limbo, the aim of this game is to defeat foes by drawing the symbol that appears above their head. The player control a good force called Lum who must destroy all the evil figures.

== Critical reception ==
The game has a Metacritic rating of 88% based on 6 critic reviews.

SlideToPlay wrote "Darklings is a fun and creative little game that uses its darkly cute atmosphere to great effect and requires quick reaction times". 148Apps said "MildMania's Darklings is a wonderfully unique and magical game that relies heavily on gesture-based touch controls." MacLife wrote "Boasting a minimalistic design style and simple controls, Darklings is a delightful affair that pulls you in further each time you play." VandalOnline wrote "This game offers a very solid gameplay, addictive for the very beginning, and deep for those looking for a mobile challenge." Pocket Gamer UK said "A fun and clever action game, Darklings shows how much can be accomplished with a touchscreen control system."
