= Light the Flower =

2012 iOS puzzle video game

- Developer: Tribeflame
- Publisher: Chillingo
- Platform: iOS
- Release: iOS – iPhone: March 22, 2012
- Genre: Puzzle game
- Mode: Single-player

Light the Flower is a puzzle game for iOS developed by Finnish studio Tribeflame and published by Chillingo. The game can be bought from App Store (iOS) for $0,99. It was released on March 22, 2012 and had its latest update on September 27, 2012. The game has received mostly positive reviews and has a Metacritic score of 80.

== Gameplay ==
Light the Flower has a total of 60 levels divided into five houses with each one containing 12 levels. The levels are unlocked by advancing in the game but all of them can be accessed in the beginning by paying a fee of $0.99. Every level has a flower and the goal of the game is to direct a beam of sunlight to that flower. The direction of the beam can be altered with mirrors. There are also bonus stars on every level that can also be collected with the beam. The number of stars you get determines your score.
