= Space Marshals =

2015 video game

- Developer: PixelBite
- Publisher: PixelBite
- Platforms: iOS, Android
- Release: January 8, 2015
- Genres: Third-person shooter, stealth
- Mode: Single-player

Space Marshals is a science fiction top-down third-person shooter stealth video game. In the game, the player is tasked with taking out various criminals and their henchmen. Space Marshals focuses heavily on stealth elements, forcing the player to sneak around enemies to avoid being attacked.

The plot of Space Marshals follows the adventures of Burton, a former Space Marshal, who was released from jail along with two others during a prison breakout. The gameplay centers around their attempts to hunt down criminals across the galaxy.

The game was released by PixelBite for iOS on January 8, 2015. The Android version was released on April 10, 2015. Both versions were generally praised by critics with little criticism. A sequel to the game was released for iOS on August 24, 2016.

== Gameplay ==
The player aims at an enemy who is crouching behind a fence.

Space Marshals is a stealth-heavy, science fiction, top-down third-person shooter video game. There are three chapters in the game, with a total of 28 missions. The player has access to four weapon slots which they can customize with different weapons. Two of the slots are for guns, and the other two are for throwable weapons like a pipe bomb or grenade. The variety of weapons that can be used in the game ranges from shotguns to grenades to axes.

After the completion of each level, the player gets a ranking from 1-5 "stars" indicating how well they performed. The rating in stars is based on various factors such as the number of player deaths, the number of high-value targets eliminated, and the number of clues found. The more stars a player earns, the more rewards are available for them to unlock at the end of the level. These rewards include weapons, bombs, distraction devices, and armor.

The player can switch between offensive mode and stealth mode. In offensive mode, the player has the advantage of being able to run quickly. In stealth mode, the player cannot be shot when behind a fence, bush, oil can, or other types of objects. However, in stealth mode, the player has to walk at a far slower pace.

The player has access to limited ammunition in the game. Every type of weapon has limited ammunition available, and if the player runs out of ammunition for that specific weapon, then they can no longer use it until they pick up more ammunition which can be found lying in various parts of each level's map. Each type of weapon has a maximum amount of ammunition that can be held for it at any one time.

== Synopsis ==
The game is set in the "Wild West", and the player is tasked with bringing criminals to justice. The player takes on the role of Burton, the main protagonist. Characterized as "arrogant", Burton is a former space marshal who was stripped of his rank for "inappropriate use of firearms during an interrogation" and thrown into a holding cell aboard the space ship. He and two others free themselves during a prison breakout, during which all the guards and crew are killed, and take control of the space ship, steering it into the lawless reaches of the Backspace. The three team up to hunt down fugitives in the galaxy, assisted by an AI known as T.A.M.I.

== Development ==
The development of Space Marshals was announced on September 18, 2014, with the launch date set for January 8, 2015. Several illustrations of the game and a trailer were released in October and it was released for iOS on October 9. At that point the game contained a single chapter. The second chapter of the game was released as a free expansion on January 27, 2015. The Android version was announced on February 17, 2015, and released on April 10, 2015. The third chapter was announced on July 30, 2015, and was released as a free update on August 13, 2015.

== Reception ==
Space Marshals

Aggregate score
Aggregator	Score
Metacritic	82/100

Review scores
Publication	Score
IGN	8.7/10
TouchArcade	4.5/5 stars

The game received mostly positive reviews from critics, with a score of 82 out of 100 on Metacritic. Many reviewers were impressed by the simplicity of the game's dual-stick controls, and how well they worked with the style and pace of the game. Phone Arena praised the replay value of the game, and how playing it several times over and over was still just as captivating as the first playthrough. Marc Luoma of iPad Insight found the game's graphics to be very smooth, especially for a mobile game. Time called it "an amazingly animated iOS game." A review on website gamer.nl praised the rewards system, as it makes it possible for players who are finding a level too easy to try harder and get better rewards.

Several reviews criticized the game for its lack of length, with only a small number of levels.

The game was one of Apple's free apps of the week in April 2015 and won editor's choice on the Apple App Store.

== Sequels ==
Space Marshals 2 was announced on August 14, 2015 and released in June 2016.

Space Marshals 3 was released on November 5, 2020
