= Touchgrind =

Skateboarding simulation game

- App Store icon
- Developer: Illusion Labs
- Publisher: Illusion Labs
- Platforms: iOS, Android
- Release: iPhone; October 15, 2008 iPad; March 31, 2010; Touchgrind BMX; May 26, 2011; Touchgrind Skate 2 November 21, 2013; Touchgrind BMX 2 April 11, 2018
- Genre: Sports video game

Touchgrind is a series of skateboarding simulation games developed and published by Swedish studio Illusion Labs. The first game released for iOS on iPhone on October 15, 2008, with a version for iPad released not long after the product's launch on March 31, 2010.

A sequel, Touchgrind Skate 2, was released on November 21, 2013 for both iOS and Android devices. The game allows players to control a variety of different skateboards to complete tricks and score points or take part in competitions to beat a high score.

Following the success of the game, a spin-off series titled Touchgrind BMX was released on May 26, 2011, with a sequel Touchgrind BMX 2 being released on April 11, 2018. A second spin-off, Touchgrind Scooter, was released on June 10, 2021.

Touchgrind BMX 3: Rivals (formerly titled Touchgrind X), the latest BMX entry in the series, was released in October 2024. This game introduces playable characters to the franchise for the first time.

== Gameplay ==
Using touch controls, players are able to control skateboards around a number of different maps in a similar manner to using a fingerboard. Tricks can be completed by using different finger motions, such as releasing the front and then back finger from the screen to complete an ollie or swiping the front finger downwards to do a flip. Points are earned for completing and combining different tricks, as well as for using map elements such as ramps and rails. Different boards are available to unlock, with certain boards having special attributes. Touchgrind Skate 2 introduces a number of improvements to the series, including challenges, board customisation and a turn-based multiplayer mode.

== Reception ==
=== Touchgrind ===
Touchgrind

Aggregate score
Aggregator	Score
GameRankings	70%

Review scores
Publication	Score
MacLife	3/5
Macworld	4/5

The original Touchgrind received "mixed or average reviews" according to the review aggregation website GameRankings. Macworld wrote of the original game, "Touchgrind is a fun, challenging application that takes a different approach to the skateboarding genre. Casual gamers who are used to glitzy stunts and stunning visuals won't find it here. Instead, players who seek difficulty and realistic physics will enjoy the exacting and addictive nature of the game." AppSpy.com noted, "IllusionLabs clearly worked hard trying to translate everything great about skate culture into their game. Aside from a slick skate themed presentation, the skateboard itself has been recreated with stunningly realistic physics for an iPhone game."

=== Touchgrind BMX ===
Touchgrind BMX

Aggregate score
Aggregator	Score
Metacritic	77/100

Review scores
Publication	Score
Edge	8/10
Gamezebo	2.5/5
Pocket Gamer	3.5/5
TouchArcade	4/5

Touchgrind BMX received "generally favorable reviews" according to the review aggregation website Metacritic.

=== Touchgrind Skate 2 ===
Touchgrind Skate 2

Aggregate score
Aggregator	Score
Metacritic	80/100

Review scores
Publication	Score
Gamezebo	3.5/5
MacLife	3.5/5
Pocket Gamer	4.5/5
Digital Spy	4/5

Touchgrind Skate 2 received "favorable" reviews according to Metacritic.
