= MovieCat! =

2010 video game

- Developer: OtherWise Games
- Publisher: OtherWise Games
- Platforms: iOS, Android
- Release: September 11, 2010
- Genre: Trivia

MovieCat! - Movie Trivia Game is an iOS trivia game developed by American studio OtherWise Games and released on September 11, 2010. It was followed by a sequel entitled MovieCat 2 - The Movie Trivia Game Sequel! which was released on December 19, 2013.

== Gameplay ==
Players answer Hollywood-themed questions on topics such as movies, actors, and awards. Unlike the similar Scene It?, there are no clips or still images taken directly from movies, and instead it artistically recreates key moments.

== Critical reception ==
=== MovieCat! ===
The game has a Metacritic rating of 84% based on 4 critic reviews.

SlideToPlay said "While Trivial Pursuit is your best source for questions about history and science, MovieCat! is perfect for starry-eyed Hollywood devotees." 148Apps said "If you like movies, this really is an unmissable purchase. I haven't had this much fun with a trivia game for a long time. The cutesy cats only help matters." IGN wrote "MovieCat makes the most out of its fuzzy gimmick, but it doesn't come at the expense of a great trivia game." AppSpy said "MovieCat! is a fun trivia title that may not stump movie-buffs, but it provides just the right amount of challenge and fun categories to make it well worth picking up for anyone who likes the occasional movie."

=== MovieCat 2 ===
SlideToPlay gave it 4/4, writing "This cute, oddball movie trivia game will challenge and entertain new players and fans of the series." TouchArcade gave it 4.5/5 stars and said "Despite a lack of high-concept features, MovieCat 2 manages to capture the fun of the original game with an updated collection of trivia. Even if you're just going at it solo, it manages to be an enjoyable experience that any movie buff needs to try." 148Apps gave it 5/5 stars, and commented "Luckily, throughout my whole 4 hours play through I didn't really notice any repeating questions, so it's obvious there's oodles of replay value here and enough variety to warrant many hours of playtime. Nobody can turn down a game fit to burst with some wonderfully adorable cute kitties, either."
