= Dogfight 1951 =

2010 video game

- Developer: Treehouse Ltd
- Platform: iOS
- Release: July 28, 2010
- Genre: Aeroplane dog-fighting

Dogfight 1951 (a.k.a. 1951: World War One) is an iOS game developed by Finnish indie studio Treehouse Ltd and released on July 28, 2010.

== Critical reception ==
The game has a Metacritic score of 86% based on 5 critic reviews.

AppSpy said " 1951 - World War One is a classic war-era dog-fighting title with a rock'n roll attitude that can only get better with time. " TouchGen said "World War One (1951) is a great purchase for anyone who enjoys aircraft games, shooters and anything with XP and level up elements in it. With its great implementation of controls and stunning visuals, it's a must buy! " 148Apps said " If you are up to a brisk, "top down RPG-ish plane shooter" challenge, then 1951 – World War One may be the perfect game for you. It plays well and it is pretty... what more do you want from an iPhone game? " AppSmile wrote "With its stylish presentation, RPG elements, and engaging controls, 1951 creates an exciting combat experience. " SlideToPlay said "It may not alter the course of history, but this fun flying and shooting game is great for a few hours."
