= Rocket Robo =

2014 video game

- App icon
- Developer: Aaron McElligott
- Publisher: Bad Kraken Games
- Platforms: iOS, Android
- Release: 30 January 2014
- Genres: Puzzle, platformer
- Mode: Single-player

Rocket Robo is a 2014 puzzle-platformer game developed by British indie developer Aaron McElligott. The game was released for iOS and Android on 30 January 2014.

== Gameplay and release ==
In Rocket Robo, the player controls an orange robot named Robo that must restore fallen stars from space. The player may use Robo's rockets. Throughout three worlds, the player can rotate their screen to manipulate the level.

On 30 January 2014, the game was released for iOS and Android.

== Reception ==
Reception

Aggregate score
| Aggregator | Score |
|---|---|
| Metacritic | 85/100 |

Review scores
| Publication | Score |
|---|---|
| Pocket Gamer | 4/5 |
| TouchArcade | 4.5/5 |
| 148Apps | 4.5/5 |

The game has a "generally favorable" Metacritic score of 85 based on four critics.

Chris Carter of TouchArcade wrote that Rocket Robo's controls were not "too loose or tight", which complemented the game's "stellar" design and "engaging" gameplay. 148Apps said, "Rocket ROBO's combination of whimsical graphics and impeccable gameplay is just stellar." Pocket Gamer wrote, "Rocket Robo is a charming and attractive casual puzzler in which its maker fleshes out its basic concept with solid controls and varied level design."
