= Pizza Vs. Skeletons =

2012 video game

- App icon design by Jacob Stevens
- Developer: Riverman Media LLC
- Publisher: Riverman Media LLC
- Platforms: iOS, Android, Apple TV, Mac
- Release: February 16, 2012: iOS, Android; February 16, 2012; Apple TV, Mac; September 15, 2017
- Genre: Platform
- Mode: Single-player

Pizza Vs. Skeletons is a platform game created and published by the indie developer Riverman Media LLC (Paul and Jacob Stevens).

== Critical reception ==
The game has a rating of 90% on Metacritic, based on 11 critic reviews.

SlideToPlay said "A weird, exciting, fun little dish of a game. You'll be coming back for seconds sooner than you think." AppSpy wrote "Pizza Vs. Skeletons aims itself at casual gamers width its huge amount of short, simple and gorgeously presented challenges that only require players to learn one set of controls to complete them all; an ingenious and at times hilariously game that's hard to rip yourself away from. " AppSafari wrote "An amazing program that you will find yourself going back to over and over again. Whether you are in it to squish the skeletons, or just to make the perfect pizza, this program is one that belongs on any iOS device." Modojo said "A guilty pleasure, as well as one of the strangest yet satisfying titles on the App Store. To those who ask why this game exists, we only have one response: why not?" Pocket Gamer UK said "Pizza Vs. Skeletons is a weird, wildly unpredictable, and thoroughly entertaining roll-'em-up. " 148Apps said "Pizza vs. Skeletons is what I love about reviewing. In an endless queue of redundant concepts out pops a game that is utterly unexpected, irreverent and loads of fun to play. Expect this one to be a long-time hit and to spawn many cheesy copycats; it's just that tasty. "

AppSmile said "With a myriad of mini-games and a ton of customization options, variety is the order of the day and Pizza vs. Skeletons has proven to be extremely hard to put down." Gamezebo said "It's really hard to convey just how strange and wonderful a game Pizza vs. Skeletons truly is." TouchGen said "The controls are tight, and especially the levels that forces the pizza to balance on a skull across a pit of spikes takes some real focus. Personally I really would have liked a touch controls option to complement the usage of the accelerometer." TouchArcade wrote "It's possible to grind the fun right out of this game, but if you stick to playing modes you enjoy and challenge yourself with three stars when you want to, there's no reason this skeleton-crushing simulator should lose its charm." Multiplayer.it wrote "Pizza vs. Skeletons is an enjoyable and funny little game, but different gameplay ideas full of humour and nonsense can't avoid its repetitiveness. "
