= Pictoword =

2013 video game

- App icon
- Developer: Kooapps
- Publisher: Kooapps
- Platforms: iOS, Android
- Release: iOS; March 1, 2013; Android; May 31, 2013
- Genre: Word game
- Mode: Single-player

Pictoword is a 2013 word game developed and published by Kooapps. It was released for iOS on March 1, 2013, and for Android on May 31, 2013. The game was also published in Google Play Pass on June 27, 2024 and is only available via subscription.

== Gameplay ==
In Pictoword, the player will “read” two pictures to form a word. The puzzles can be a combination of the pictures (A picture of an ear and ring will form Earring), a homonym (A picture of a knight and mare will form Nightmare) or what the pictures sound like (A picture of a taxi and dough will form Tuxedo). Players can request help from social media followers or buy Boosts with Coins.

Players can earn Coins by completing levels, watching ads, completing daily quests and daily puzzles, and buying them in the shop. Coins can be spent on Boosts that help with levels, and on Theme Packs of new levels.

Players can join Families of other players or create their own. The “Join Family” feature can be unlocked by paying coins. The “Create Family” on the other hand, can be used by subscribing to a VIP membership. It is one of the said subscription’s perks.

Players can pay real money for a VIP Subscription that grants coins, levels, and features.

== Reception ==
Pictoword received a score of 84% from Appstime, saying that "With multiple categories and difficulty levels, Pictoword makes a perfect puzzle game for all age groups by just using two images." Apps Thunder liked the concept and the user friendly interface, and gave it a 4.1/5 rating. Gnome Escape liked the various theme packs, and said that "Pictoword is one of those addicting puzzle games that make you think outside the box and see images in a new light." Get Android Stuff was less enthusiastic in their review, saying that game is quite slow and boring, but liked that the game is easy to play and is suitable for all ages.

== Awards ==
Pictoword won the Shining Star Award in the "Educational or Knowledge Reference App" category and the Superstar Award in the "Learning App for Kids category in the 2016 Mobile Star Awards. It also won 2016 Academic's Choice Smart Media Award. It was also nominated at Global Mobile App Summit and Awards 2017 (GMASA). The game was nominated for "Best Educational Game" and "Best Puzzle Game" at The Independent Game Developers' Association Awards 2018. The game was also listed as one of the Therapeutic Apps for iPhone and iPad by the Flinders University, Australia. In 2019, Pictoword was a Gold Winner at Serious Play Conference Awards.

Pictoword was the recipient of the 2020 ED/IES Small Business Innovation Research grant. The Institute of Education Sciences Small Business Innovation Research program (ED/IES SBIR) funds entrepreneurial developers to create the next generation of education technology for students, teachers, and administrators in general and special education. Pictoword also won the Gold Winner awrd at Serious Play Conference Awards' "12 Serious Games Designed for Use in Grades K-12 Education" in 2022.

Pictoword School, an adapted version of Pictoword for school use, was the recipient of the 2020 and 2021 Institute of Education Sciences Small Business Innovation Research program (ED/IES SBIR) grants. The ED/IES SBIR funds entrepreneurial developers to create the next generation of education technology for students, teachers, and administrators in general and special education. Pictoword School also received the Gold Winner award at the Serious Play Conference Awards’ “12 Serious Games Designed for Use in Grades K-12 Education” in 2022. Pictoword School also became a finalist at The EdTech Cool Tool Awards 2023 for the “Language Learning Solution” criteria.
