= Labyrinth 2 =

- Labyrinth 2 icon
- Developer: Illusion Labs
- Publisher: Illusion Labs AB
- Platforms: iOS, Android
- Release: 2009
- Modes: Single-player, multiplayer

Labyrinth 2 is a 2009 game developed by Illusion Labs for the iPod Touch, iPhone, Android, and Labyrinth 2 HD for the iPad and it is the sequel to the original game Labyrinth. released in 2008. Labyrinth 2 utilizes the iPhone's tilt recognition as with most other labyrinth games for the iPhone at the time. However, Labyrinth 2 adds many new elements to its gameplay, such as bumpers, cannons, slingshots, duplicators and many more. Players of the original Labyrinth could play five Labyrinth 2 style levels, even in the free lite edition.

== Labyrinth 2 HD ==
Labyrinth 2 HD is the iPad version of this game. This version features a much bigger playing area, and a much bigger level editor. This version of the app costs $7.99 USD (£4.99 GBP).

== Level editor ==
Labyrinth 2 allows the player to create their own levels through an online level editor. Levels created in the level editor by other players can be downloaded.

== Reception ==
Labyrinth 2 received positive reviews. TouchArcade rated the game 4.5 out of 5 stars, praising the game's level editor. Metacritic gave the game a score of 89 out of 100 based on reviews from 8 critics, indicating "generally favorable reviews".
