= Illusion Labs =

Swedish mobile game company

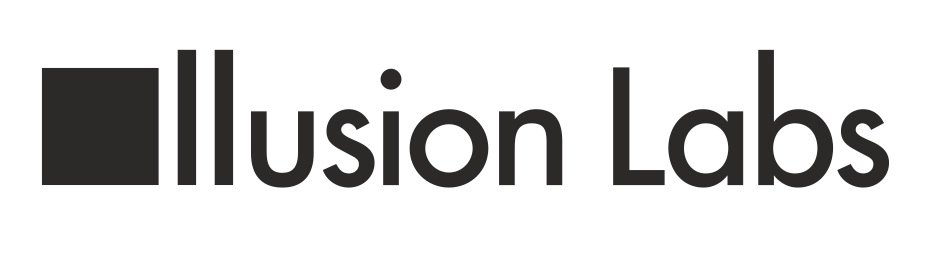
- Type: Private
- Industry: Video games
- Founded: 2007
- Headquarters: Malmö, Sweden
- Key people: Carl Loodberg, Andreas Alptun
- Number of employees: 10
- Website: Official website

Illusion Labs is a Swedish developer and publisher of video games, based in Malmö, Sweden. Illusion Labs was founded in autumn of 2007.

The game company creates applications and games for iOS and Android, combining engineering and aesthetics. Illusion Labs specializes in graphics, physics simulation, and novel interaction such as accelerometer and multi-touch. They exclusively make in-house productions and no contract work.

== Products ==
Illusion Labs has produced a number of games for different platforms.

- Labyrinth (2008)
- Touchgrind (2008)
- Sway (2009)
- Labyrinth 2 (2009)
- Foosball (2010)
- Blast-A-Way (2012)
- Mr. Crab (2013)
- Touchgrind Skate 2 (2013)
- Rocket Cars (2014)
- Touchgrind BMX (2014)
- Nono Islands (2015)
- Mr. Crab 2 (2016)
- Bacon Escape (2017)
- Bacon Escape 2 (2018)
- Touchgrind BMX 2 (2018)
- Way of the Turtle (2019)
- Touchgrind Scooter (2021)
