= KamiCrazy =

2008 video game

- Developer: Fluid Pixel
- Publisher: Fluid Pixel
- Platform: iOS
- Release: December 12, 2008
- Genre: Puzzle

KamiCrazy is a puzzle video game developed and published by Fluid Pixel, and released on December 12, 2008. The game has met welcome reception and, at its peak, has seen downloads of around 50,000 per day.

== Influences ==
The game has similarities to retro games, most notably Lemmings, with the game following a similar key concept: a number of 'characters' appear at one point in the level, and the player's goal is to get them to another point safely.

== Controls ==
Kamicrazy uses iOS's gesture controls.

== Reception ==
Since Kamicrazy's launch it has been reviewed on websites and been featured in national papers, including the News of the World, where it was highlighted as being the best game to play on the iPhone.
