= Spin Up =

2012 video game

- Developer(s): Nenad Katic
- Platform(s): iOS
- Release: March 28, 2012
- Genre(s): Arcade
- Mode(s): Single-player

Spin Up is a 2012 arcade game developed and published by Nenad Katic. It was released on March 28, 2012, for iOS. In the game, the player must rotate rings of a cylinder to prevent an astronaut from being sucked into space. Spin Up received a positive reception, with praise for its fast-paced gameplay.

== Gameplay ==
In Spin Up, the player controls a cylinder to help an astronaut escape from being sucked into space. The player must rotate the rings of the cylinder to align ladders for the astronaut to keep climbing. If encountering a ring that cannot be moved, the player must rotate a higher ring. Occasionally, aliens will invade the play area; if they are either below or above the player, a game over occurs. To defeat one, the player must grab a weapon, which can only be used once.

== Reception ==
Reception

Aggregate score
Aggregator	Score
Metacritic	89/100

Review scores
Publication	Score
Gamezebo	90/100
148Apps	4/5
Multiplayer.it	8.5/10
Slide to Play	Must Have

On Metacritic, the game received a "generally favorable" rating of 89 based on five critics.

The game received a positive reception.
