= New Star Soccer =

- Developer: New Star Games
- Publisher: New Star Games
- Director: Simon Read
- Platforms: Windows, iOS, Android, Windows Phone
- Release: 2003
- Mode: Single-player

New Star Soccer, also known as NSS, is a series of football video games developed and published by New Star Games. The games let the player create and control a soccer player's career as they move through the ranks of the leagues and national teams. The game is best known for its mobile version, which won a BAFTA in 2013 for Best Sports/Fitness Game.

== Gameplay ==
The game sees the player take control of a single, 16-year-old football player in the lowest league of the country of their choosing. The game has no end point, and a player could theoretically play forever.

== History ==
In the first two versions of the game, NSS 1 (2003) and NSS 2 (2004), the action on the field was a running text commentary of key elements of the match. Certain situations required intervention to make a decision on how the player acts, like whether to pass, tackle or shoot. Since the third version of the game, NSS3, released in 2005, the gamer controls his player with the keyboard, joystick or gamepad. Matches are played out in 2D graphics, giving full control of a particular player's actions.

A fourth version of the game, NSS4 (Later re-released as NSS 2010), was released on November 7, 2008. Three public betas featuring the match engine only were released, and 6 private career betas were released. The new game heralded major changes because it consisted of a single application controlling career and match gameplay, rather than two separate applications, as in New Star Soccer 3. It featured an entirely new game engine with improved gameplay, including 360° control, more realistic dribbling and 3D graphics.

NSS 4 was the first in the series to feature a Macintosh version of the game, and Linux support has also been discussed. Beta versions are also being made available to the general public in the official forum. The fourth installment also included a database of over 30,000 players, 3000 teams and stadiums.

The fifth version of New Star Soccer, NSS5, was released in August 2011. NSS5 returned to 2D gameplay, but with a completely new match engine. The game was a major departure from previous releases in that it is free-to-play and is integrated with an online account system. Free users are allowed to play up to 3 in-game matches a day, whereas in a previous version of the game, a demo version with a 10-match limit was offered. Users wishing to play more often must purchase a premium account. Another change is the abandonment of the vast player database that shipped with previous versions. NSG cited the inconvenience of the massive effort required to create, maintain and implement such a database as affecting their decision to drop it. However, the game still featured the leagues of over 100 countries, and used the highest scoring players on each team's leaderboard as each team's players.

=== Mobile versions ===
The next release of New Star Soccer came in 2012 with a mobile version separate and distinct from the computer versions. Instead of playing a full match, the player controls important points during the match, such as free kicks and chances in front of the goal. How the player performs during these moments changes the outcome of the game and helps the player with their relationships off the pitch. The game includes an extensive career module, including training and off-pitch events. The mobile game won the 2013 Sports/Fitness BAFTA Award. In 2016, the game underwent a graphical overhaul, which also included the addition of replays and a partnership with soccer magazine FourFourTwo. The game was originally developed with Blitz Research Ltd's Monkey X games programming language and released on Android, iOS, and Flash.

In 2016, a choose your own adventure-style game was released for iOS titled New Star Soccer G-Story.

== Reception ==
New Star Soccer has received generally positive reviews from critics. Shane Richmond of The Daily Telegraph praised the game, stating that it "has had me addicted". Evan Kypreos of Trusted Reviews also wrote positively of the game, giving it 4/5 stars and calling it "fun and worthwhile" while praising its simplicity, deeming it "better than the sum of its parts". James Barnes of The Boar gave a positive review, praising the game's controls and declaring it "simply gets the balance right".

== Awards ==
- In December 2005, GameTunnel named NSS3 "Sports Game of the Year", and placed the game as the 10th best independently produced game of 2005.
- In January 2006, PC Zone named NSS3 "Indie Game Of The Month".
- In December 2008, GameTunnel named NSS4 "Sports Game of the Year", and placed it 6th best independently produced game of 2008.

== Spinoffs ==
On 11 October 2016, a cricket version of the game, titled New Star Cricket, was released. Other spinoffs include New Star Manager and New Star Baseball. These spinoffs have been less successful than the original game, having received a combined three million downloads to New Star Soccer's ten million.

== See also ==
- Retro Goal, another retro-style association football game by the same developer
