= Skygoblin =

Swedish video game developer

- Type: Private
- Industry: Video games
- Founded: 2005
- Headquarters: Gothenburg, Sweden
- Products: Nord; The Journey Down
- Website: www.skygoblin.com

Skygoblin is a Swedish video game developer based in Gothenburg, formed in 2005 as SLX Games. They became Skygoblin in 2011, after they adopted the name used by the development group of the freeware version of The Journey Down.

They developed the casual 3D MMORPG Nord in 2009, which became the first fully 3D virtual world on Facebook when the game was adapted for that site in 2010.

In 2010, they released the freeware version of the first chapter of graphic adventure game The Journey Down. After a two-month delay, they released a commercial high definition remake of The Journey Down in May 2012. The Journey Down: Chapter One was part of the Indie Royale summer bundle in July 2012.

== Video games ==
- Nord (2009)
- The Journey Down: Over the Edge (2010)
- The Journey Down: Chapter One (2012)
- The Journey Down: Chapter Two (2014)
- The Journey Down: Chapter Three (2017)
- Hellfront: Honeymoon (2018)
