= The Journey Down =

- Developer: Skygoblin
- Publisher: Skygoblin
- Engine: Adventure Game Studio (Chapter One freeware version)
- Platforms: iOS; Linux; Mac OS X Microsoft Windows; Nintendo Switch; Xbox One; PlayStation 4
- Release: Chapter One: Windows low-resolution; WW: August 18, 2010 Linux, OS X, Windows; NA: May 18, 2012 iOS; NA: December 19, 2012 Steam; NA: January 9, 2013; Chapter Two: iOS, Linux, OS X, Windows; WW: August 25, 2014; Chapter Three: iOS, Linux, OS X, Windows; WW: September 21, 2017
- Genre: Adventure
- Mode: Single-player

The Journey Down is an episodic adventure video game for Linux, Mac OS X, Microsoft Windows, iOS, Xbox One, Nintendo Switch and PlayStation 4 by Skygoblin. An Android version is currently in development.

The Journey Down: Chapter One was based on a low-resolution freeware adventure game, called The Journey Down: Over the Edge. The Journey Down: Chapter One improves on the freeware version with high definition graphics, full voiceovers, plus some additional locations and puzzles. The rest of the chapters will be presented in the high definition style of the commercial remake of Chapter One.

== Episodes ==
The game was released in chapters. There are three chapters in total.

- Chapter One: Over the Edge (2010)
- Chapter Two: Into the Mist (2014)
- Chapter Three (2017)

== Plot ==
=== Chapter One: Over the Edge ===
A pair of mobsters storm the office of a university professor, only to find the professor missing. The trail eventually leads to the waterfront Gas 'n' Charter, which has been run by Bwana and Kito ever since they were mysteriously abandoned by their adoptive father. When given the opportunity to help a young woman named Lina, the pair jump at the chance, as they are seriously behind on their electricity bills. Lina is seeking a lost book that may hold the illegal secret to reaching the Underland. Unfortunately, their airplane hasn't been flown in years, and will need a variety of parts and repairs in order to take off.

=== Chapter Two: Into the Mist ===
The group heads to the gloomy, mist shrouded town of Port Artue. Upon arrival, the trio find themselves confronted by local police. Bwana and Kito are thrown in jail, and Lina is taken away by the police chief. Bwana and Kito then attempt to find a way to escape from prison, find Lina, and attempt to discover how their adoptive father was connected to the mystery of the Underland.

=== Chapter Three ===
In the final chapter, the trio heads into the depths of the Underland where they discover a huge mining facility belonging to the Armando Power Company. Bwana and Kito return to the city of St Armando in hopes of finding Professor Moorhead who they believe can help them stop the power company, while Lina ventures further into the Underland.

== Release ==
The low definition freeware version of The Journey Down: Over the Edge was released in 2010. The commercial high definition remake of The Journey Down: Chapter One was originally scheduled to be released in March 2012, but the release was pushed back to May 2012. The first chapter was included in the Indie Royale summer bundle in June 2012. The second chapter was released for Windows, Mac, Linux, and iOS simultaneously in August 2014. The third chapter was released for Windows, Mac, Linux, and iOS simultaneously on 21 September 2017. The three chapters were released together as a trilogy for PlayStation 4 on 29 May 2018, Xbox One on 1 June 2018 and Nintendo Switch on 21 February 2019.

== Kickstarter ==
On October 1, 2015, a crowdfunding campaign on Kickstarter was started to raise funding for the third chapter of The Journey Down with a goal of 300.000 SEK. The campaign raised a total of 409.237 SEK.

== Reception ==
Aggregate review scores
Game	Metacritic
Chapter One	(Windows) 72% (iOS) 80%
Chapter Two	(Windows) 78% (iOS) 89%
Chapter Three	(Windows) 80%

The first chapter was met with mostly positive reception. For the Windows version of episode one, the video game review aggregator website, GameRankings lists a review average of 74.11%, and Metacritic lists a review average of 72%. The iOS version of episode one fared better, with a review average of 80% on both Metacritic and GameRankings. The second chapter was received better than the first, with a review average of 84% for the Windows version and a review average of 88% for the iOS version on Gamerankings, and a review average of 78% for the Windows version and a review average of 89% for the iOS version on Metacritic.
