= Retro Goal =

2021 video game

- App icon
- Developer: New Star Games
- Publisher: New Star Games
- Platforms: Android, iOS, Nintendo Switch
- Release: June 24, 2021 (Android, iOS); November 24, 2022 (Switch)
- Genre: Sports
- Mode: Single-player

Retro Goal is a 2021 sports video game developed by New Star Games for mobile phones and later ported to the Nintendo Switch. It is a successor to New Star's American football game, Retro Bowl (2020). Retro Goal is free to play on Android and iOS, and available via purchase for Nintendo Switch.

== Gameplay ==
Retro Goal is a game about association club football. The game lacks official licensing for real-world clubs. It features a component of team management between matches. The graphics are in the style of the 16-bit era.

In 2023, the game was added to Apple Arcade as Retro Goal+, providing premium features of the game.

== Reception ==
Reception

Review scores
Publication	Score
Nintendo Life	8/10
148Apps	4/5
Multiplayer.it	7.5/10

Nintendo Life wrote: "Retro Goal is a distinctively light and fun take on football, coming at a budget price and having enough depth and charm to get players hooked. It has a stylish look and will raise a smile among enthusiasts; in fact, the only way it fails to match its brilliant predecessor — Retro Bowl — is in the gameplay department." They later included the game on their list of best football games on the Switch. 148Apps summarized: "Retro Goal is a satisfying mix of arcade soccer action and light management strategy." Multiplayer.it liked the gameplay and said the retro-style graphics and sound are excellent although they criticized the lack of animations and the reuse of game assets. Defector concluded: "Players of Football Manager will find Retro Goal to be a bit basic, but those looking for a phone distraction will find themselves successfully distracted."

TechRadar included Retro Goal on their list of best sports games for iPad. Pocket Gamer included the game on their list of top 25 football games for Android.

== See also ==
- New Star Soccer, the developer's previous association football game series
