= New Star Games =

British independent video game developer

New Star Games is a British independent video game developer specialising in sports role-playing video games. It was founded by Simon Read in 2003 and incorporated in 2006.

Their most well-known product is the New Star Soccer series, role-playing football games in which the user controls one player in a squad, making decisions about his career and lifestyle along the way. The game received the "Indie Sports Game of the Year Award 2008" from GameTunnel. It was the first non-text based game released by New Star Games.

In addition to sports career games, New Star Games notably released Super Laser Racer, a stylised futuristic combat racing game. This was the first of the developer's games to be made available on Steam. Simon Read approached Steam with New Star Soccer 5, but Valve were apparently not interested in distributing it, a decision they would later reverse.

In 2013, the mobile version of New Star Soccer received a BAFTA Game Award in the Sports/Fitness category.

The company also experienced success with their 2020 game Retro Bowl, which at its peak became the most downloaded game on the Apple App Store.

== Games ==
- New Star Soccer (2003)
- New Star Soccer 2 (2004)
- New Star Soccer 3 (2005)
- Sensational Soccer (2006)
- New Star Soccer 4 (2008)
- New Star Grand Prix (2009)
- New Star Tennis (2010)
- Super Laser Racer (2010)
- New Star Soccer 5 (2011)
- New Star Soccer G-Story (2016)
- New Star Cricket (2016)
- New Star Manager (2019)
- Buoyant (2019)
- Retro Bowl (2020)
- New Star Baseball (2020)
- Retro Goal (2021)
- Retro Bowl College (2023)
- New Star GP (2023)
- Retro Slam Tennis (2024)
- NFL Retro Bowl '25 (2024)

Games with unknown release dates

- Euro Cup Manager
- New Star Hockey
- Sports Flip
- World Cup Manager
- Universal Soccer Manager 2
