= 2011 in video games =

Numerous video games were released in 2011. Many awards went to games such as Batman: Arkham City, Portal 2, The Elder Scrolls V: Skyrim, The Legend of Zelda: Skyward Sword, Madden NFL 12, NBA 2K12, WWE '12, WWE All-Stars, and Uncharted 3: Drake's Deception. 2011 also marked the worldwide release of the Nintendo 3DS, the first console of the eighth generation.

Series with new installments in 2011 include Ace Combat, Alice: Madness Returns, Assassin's Creed, Batman: Arkham, Battlefield, Call of Duty, Call of Juarez, Cities XL, Crysis, Dead Space, Deus Ex, Dragon Age, Driver, Duke Nukem, Dynasty Warriors, The Elder Scrolls, F.E.A.R, Forza Motorsport, Gears of War, Infamous, Killzone, The Legend of Zelda, LittleBigPlanet, Mario Kart, Modern Combat, Mortal Kombat, MX vs. ATV, Need for Speed, Operation Flashpoint, Pokémon, Portal, Rayman, Red Faction, Red Orchestra, Resistance, Saints Row, Star Wars: Knights of the Old Republic, Super Mario, Total War, Tropico, Uncharted, Sonic the Hedgehog, and The Witcher.

2011 saw the introduction of several new properties, including Bastion, Dark Souls, Dead Island, Senran Kagura, Homefront, L.A. Noire, Minecraft, Rage, and Skylanders.

== Legend ==
Video game platforms
3DS	Nintendo 3DS, 3DS Virtual Console, iQue 3DS	BBOS	BlackBerry OS family, including BlackBerry Tablet OS and BlackBerry 10	DROID	Android
DS	Nintendo DS, DSiWare, iQue DS	iOS	iOS, iPhone, iPod, iPadOS, iPad, visionOS, Apple Vision Pro	LIN	Linux, SteamOS
OSX	macOS	PS2	PlayStation 2	PS3	PlayStation 3
PSN	PlayStation Network	PSP	PlayStation Portable	PSV	PlayStation Vita
WEB	Browser game	Wii	Wii, WiiWare, Wii Virtual Console	WIN	Windows, all versions Windows 95 and up
WP	Windows Phone	XB360	Xbox 360, Xbox 360 Live Arcade		

== Top-rated games ==
=== Critically acclaimed games ===
Metacritic (MC) and GameRankings (GR) are aggregators of video game journalism reviews.

2011 games and expansions scoring at least 90/100 (MC) or 90% (GR)
Game	Publisher	Release Date	Platform	MC score	GR score
Batman: Arkham City	Warner Bros. Interactive Entertainment	October 18, 2011	PS3	96/100	95.94%
The Elder Scrolls V: Skyrim	Bethesda Softworks	November 11, 2011	X360	96/100	95.15%
Portal 2	Valve	April 19, 2011	WIN	95/100	95.16%
Portal 2	Valve	April 19, 2011	X360	95/100	94%
Portal 2	Valve	April 19, 2011	PS3	95/100	93.95%
The Elder Scrolls V: Skyrim	Bethesda Softworks	November 11, 2011	WIN	94/100	94.42%
The Legend of Zelda: Ocarina of Time 3D	Nintendo	June 16, 2011	3DS	94/100	93.89%
Batman: Arkham City	Warner Bros. Interactive Entertainment	October 18, 2011	X360	94/100	93.88%
Mass Effect 2	Electronic Arts	January 17, 2011	PS3	94/100	93.09%
The Legend of Zelda: Skyward Sword	Nintendo	November 18, 2011	Wii	93/100	93.15%
LittleBigPlanet 2	Sony Computer Entertainment	January 18, 2011	PS3	91/100	92.04%
The Ico & Shadow of the Colossus Collection	Sony Computer Entertainment	September 22, 2011	PS3	92/100	91.79%
Uncharted 3: Drake's Deception	Sony Computer Entertainment	November 1, 2011	PS3	92/100	91.78%
Rayman Origins	Ubisoft	November 15, 2011	Wii	92/100	91.27%
The Elder Scrolls V: Skyrim	Bethesda Softworks	November 11, 2011	PS3	92/100	88%
Pushmo	Nintendo	October 5, 2011	3DS	90/100	91.5%
Gears of War 3	Microsoft Game Studios	September 20, 2011	X360	91/100	91.49%
Forza Motorsport 4	Microsoft Game Studios	October 11, 2011	X360	91/100	90.66%
Batman: Arkham City	Warner Bros. Interactive Entertainment	October 18, 2011	WIN	91/100	90.43%
FIFA 12	EA Sports	September 27, 2011	PS3	90/100	90.65%
FIFA 12	EA Sports	September 27, 2011	X360	90/100	90.55%
Bastion	Warner Bros. Interactive Entertainment	August 16, 2011	WIN	86/100	90.36%
Deus Ex: Human Revolution	Square Enix	August 23, 2011	WIN	90/100	90.19%
Metal Gear Solid HD Collection	Konami	November 8, 2011	PS3	89/100	90.14%
Super Mario 3D Land	Nintendo	November 3, 2011	3DS	90/100	90.09%
MLB 11: The Show	Sony Computer Entertainment	March 8, 2011	PS3	90/100	89.88%
NBA 2K12	2K	October 4, 2011	PS3	90/100	89.81%
Metal Gear Solid HD Collection	Konami	November 8, 2011	X360	90/100	89.81%
Limbo	Playdead	July 19, 2011	PS3	90/100	89.55%
Total War: Shogun 2	Sega	March 15, 2011	WIN	90/100	89.42%
Dead Space 2	Electronic Arts	January 25, 2011	X360	90/100	89.1%
FIFA 12	EA Sports	September 27, 2011	WIN	90/100	90%
NBA 2K12	2K	October 4, 2011	X360	90/100	88.39%

=== Major awards ===
Category/Organization		29th Golden Joystick Awards October 21, 2011	VGA December 10, 2011		15th Annual Interactive Achievement Awards February 9, 2012		12th Game Developers Choice Awards March 7, 2012	8th British Academy Games Awards March 16, 2012
Game of the Year		Portal 2	The Elder Scrolls V: Skyrim					Portal 2
Independent / Debut (Note: Certain award presentations combine these categories.)		—N/a	Minecraft		—N/a		Bastion	Insanely Twisted Shadow Planet
Downloadable		Minecraft	Bastion					—N/a
Mobile/Handheld	Mobile	Angry Birds Rio	Super Mario 3D Land		Infinity Blade II		Superbrothers: Sword & Sworcery EP	Peggle HD
Mobile/Handheld	Handheld	Angry Birds Rio	Super Mario 3D Land		Super Mario 3D Land		Superbrothers: Sword & Sworcery EP	Peggle HD
Innovation		Nintendo 3DS	—N/a		Skylanders: Spyro's Adventure		Johann Sebastian Joust	LittleBigPlanet 2
Artistic Achievement or Graphics	Animation	—N/a	Uncharted 3: Drake's Deception		Uncharted 3: Drake's Deception		Uncharted 3: Drake's Deception	Rayman Origins
Artistic Achievement or Graphics	Art Direction	—N/a	Uncharted 3: Drake's Deception		Uncharted 3: Drake's Deception		Uncharted 3: Drake's Deception	Rayman Origins
Audio	Music	—N/a	Bastion		Portal 2		Portal 2	L.A. Noire
Audio	Sound Design	—N/a	—N/a		Battlefield 3		Portal 2	Battlefield 3
Character or Performance	Actor	—N/a	Stephen Merchant as Wheatley; Portal 2	The Joker; Batman: Arkham City	Wheatley; Portal 2		—N/a	Mark Hamill as The Joker; Batman: Arkham City
Character or Performance	Actress	—N/a	Ellen McLain as GLaDOS; Portal 2	The Joker; Batman: Arkham City	Wheatley; Portal 2		—N/a	Mark Hamill as The Joker; Batman: Arkham City
Game Direction or Design		—N/a			The Elder Scrolls V: Skyrim		Portal 2	
Narrative		—N/a			The Elder Scrolls V: Skyrim		Portal 2	
Technical Achievement	Gameplay Engineering	—N/a			The Elder Scrolls V: Skyrim		Battlefield 3	—N/a
Technical Achievement	Visual Engineering	—N/a			Uncharted 3: Drake's Deception		Battlefield 3	—N/a
Multiplayer/Online	Online Gameplay	World of Warcraft	Portal 2		Star Wars: The Old Republic		—N/a	Battlefield 3
Multiplayer/Online	Connectivity	World of Warcraft	Portal 2		Portal 2		—N/a	Battlefield 3
Action/Adventure	Action/Shooter	Call of Duty: Black Ops	Call of Duty: Modern Warfare 3				—N/a	Batman: Arkham City
Action/Adventure	Adventure	Assassin's Creed: Brotherhood	Batman: Arkham City				—N/a	Batman: Arkham City
Casual or Family	Casual	—N/a			Fruit Ninja Kinect		—N/a	LittleBigPlanet 2
Casual or Family	Family	—N/a			LittleBigPlanet 2		—N/a	LittleBigPlanet 2
Fighting		Mortal Kombat					—N/a	
Role-Playing		Fallout: New Vegas	The Elder Scrolls V: Skyrim				—N/a	
Sports	Individual	FIFA 11	Fight Night Champion		FIFA 12		—N/a	Kinect Sports: Season Two
Sports	Team	FIFA 11	NBA 2K12		FIFA 12		—N/a	Kinect Sports: Season Two
Racing		Gran Turismo 5	Forza Motorsport 4				—N/a	
Strategy/Simulation		StarCraft II: Wings of Liberty	—N/a		Orcs Must Die!		—N/a	Total War: Shogun 2
Special Award		Outstanding Contribution	Video Game Hall of Fame	Gamer God	Hall of Fame	Pioneer Awards	Lifetime Achievement Award	Special Award
Special Award		Sonic the Hedgehog (Sega)	The Legend of Zelda	Blizzard Entertainment	Tim Sweeney	Ed Logg	Warren Spector	Markus Persson

== Major events ==
Date	Event	Ref.
January 6 - 9	International Consumer Electronics Show 2011 held in Las Vegas, Nevada, USA	
February 26	The Nintendo 3DS, Nintendo's newest handheld console, releases in Japan.	
February 28 – March 4	Game Developers Conference 2011 held in San Francisco, California.	
March 11	As a result of the 2011 Tōhoku earthquake, certain video game releases were cancelled or postponed. Additionally, several servers used for Internet gaming were shut down temporarily.	
March 11 - 13	PAX East 2011 held in Boston, Massachusetts.	
March 25 - 31	The Nintendo 3DS released in America, Europe and Australia.	
April 20	PlayStation Network services were suspended by Sony. The suspension lasted for 23 days.	
May 19	South Korea passes a law known as the "Youth Protection Revision Act", which regulates children under the age of sixteen playing online video games.	
June 6	Twitch.tv, a video game livestreaming service and website that focuses on video game content and esports is launched.	
June 7 - 9	E3 2011 was held at the Los Angeles Convention Center.	
June 21	Sonic the Hedgehog, one of the best-selling video game franchises of all time, celebrated its 20th anniversary.	
June 27	The Supreme Court of the United States issues their ruling on Brown v. Entertainment Merchants Association, declaring video games as protected free speech.	
August 4 - 7	QuakeCon 2011: The massive annual LAN party held in Dallas, Texas.	
August 15 - 17	Game Developers Conference 2011 Europe held in Cologne, Germany.	
August 18 - 22	Gamescom 2011 held at Cologne, Germany	
August 26 - 28	PAX Prime 2011 held in Seattle, Washington.	
September 9	The Crash Bandicoot franchise celebrated its 15th anniversary.	
September 15–18	Tokyo Game Show 2011	
September 22–25	Eurogamer Expo 2011 held in Earls Court in London, England.	
October 15–16	EB Games Expo 2011 held in Gold Coast Convention and Exhibition Centre in Australia.	
October 21–22	BlizzCon 2011 held in Anaheim Convention Center in California.	
November 18–19	Minecon held in Las Vegas, Nevada. Minecraft gets its full release on the 18th.	
December 3	10th anniversary of the Jak and Daxter series.	
December 10	Spike Video Game Awards.	
December 31	Artech Studios disbanded.	

== Notable deaths ==
- May 20 – Randy Savage, 58, pro wrestler and actor (cover star of WWF WrestleMania Challenge, WWF Super WrestleMania, WWE All Stars).
- October 5 – Steve Jobs, 56, businessman and creator of Apple and iOS.

== Hardware releases ==
The following is a list of game consoles released in 2011. This year saw the release of the first two consoles in the eighth generation of gaming, the Nintendo 3DS and the PlayStation Vita (only in Japan).

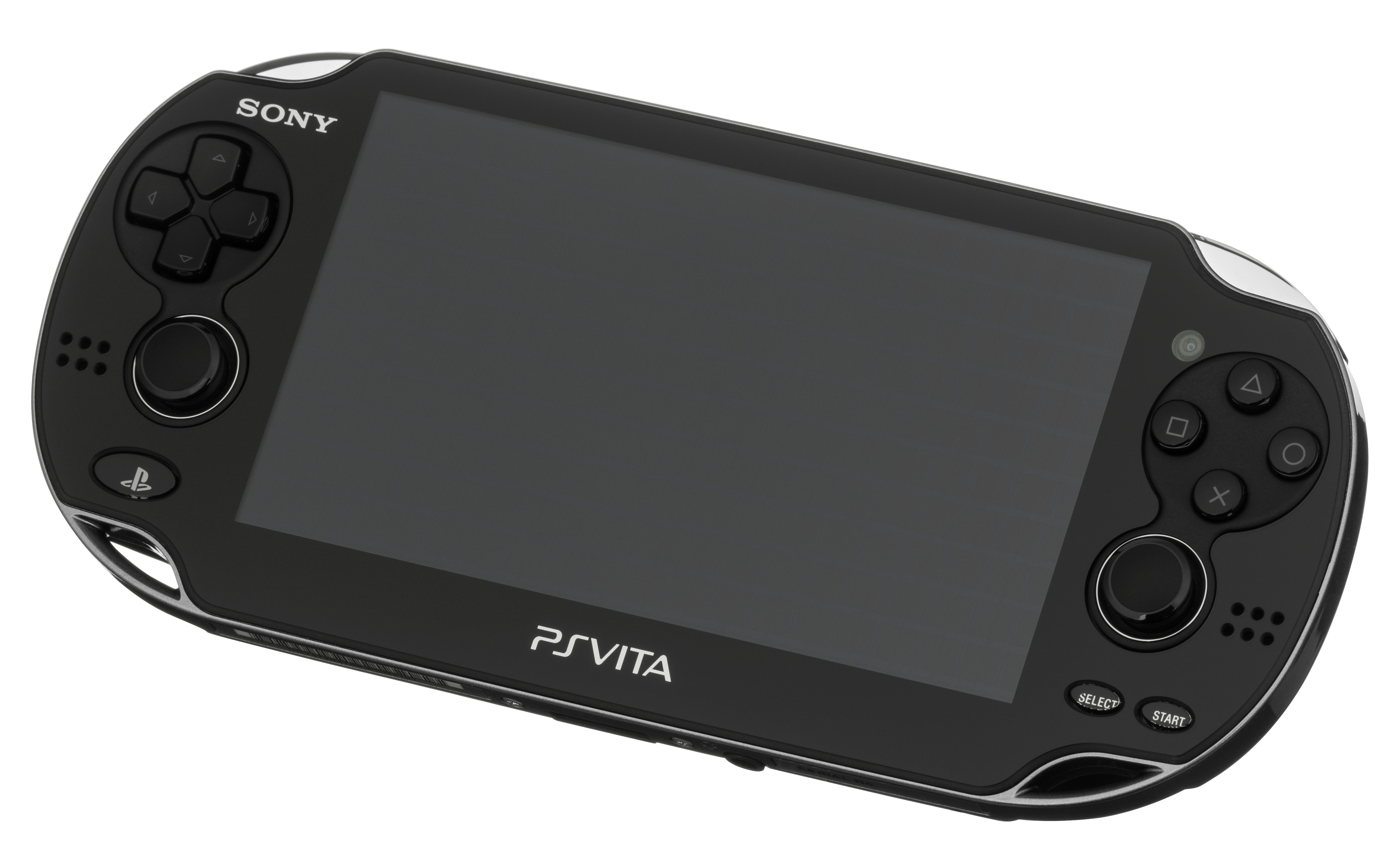
PlayStation Vita

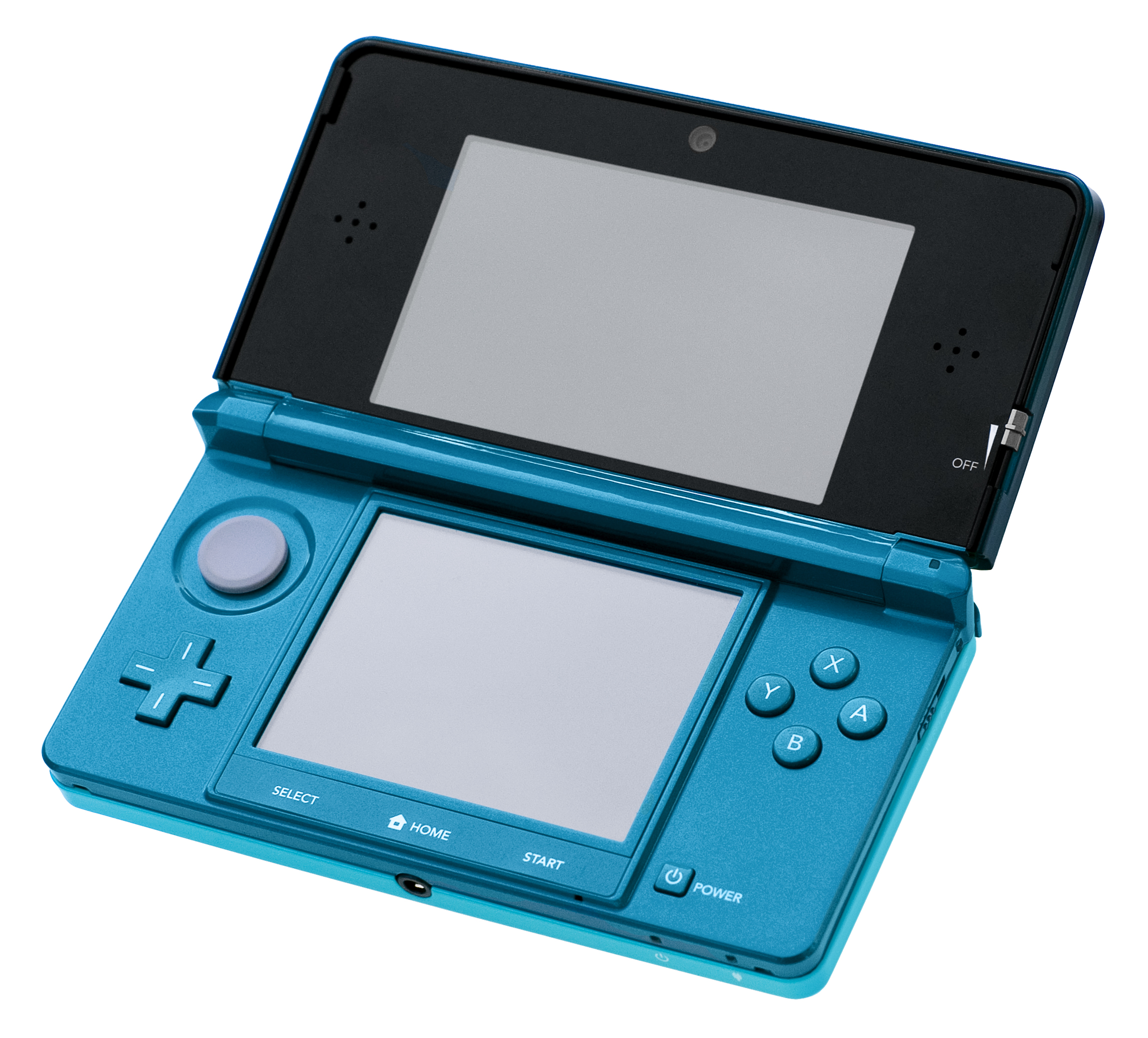
Nintendo 3DS

Date	Console	Ref.
February 26	Nintendo 3DS^{JP}	
March 25	Nintendo 3DS^{EU}	
March 27	Nintendo 3DS^{NA}	
March 31	Nintendo 3DS^{AU}	
April 1	Xperia Play^{EU}	
May 26	Xperia Play^{NA}	
October 23	Wii (Family Edition/RVL-101 model)^{NA}	
October 26	Xperia Play^{JP}	
November 4	Wii (Family Edition/RVL-101 model)^{EU}	
November 11	Wii (Family Edition/RVL-101 model)^{AU}	
December 17	PlayStation Vita^{JP}	

== Games released in 2011 ==
=== Genre Legend ===
Video game genres
Action	Action game	Action RPG	Action role-playing game	Action-adventure	Action-adventure game
Adventure	Adventure game	Brawler	Beat 'em up	Business sim	Business simulation game
City builder	City-building game	Digital tabletop	Digital tabletop game	Endless runner	Endless runner
Fighting	Fighting game	Fitness	Fitness game	FPS	First-person shooter
Graphic adventure	Graphic adventure	Hack and slash	Hack and slash	Interactive film	Interactive film
Life sim	Life simulation game	Metroidvania	Metroidvania	MMO	Massively multiplayer online game
MOBA	Multiplayer online battle arena	Music	Music video game	Party	Party video game
PCA	Point-and-click adventure	Platformer	Platformer	Puzzle	Puzzle video game
Puzzle-platformer	Puzzle-platformer	Racing	Racing video game	Rhythm	Rhythm game
Roguelike	Roguelike, Roguelite	RPG	Role-playing video game	RTS	Real-time strategy
Sandbox	Sandbox game	Shoot 'em up	Shoot 'em up	Shooter	Shooter game
Simulation	Simulation video game	Sports	Sports video game	Stealth	Stealth game
Strategy	Strategy video game	Survival	Survival game	Survival horror	Survival horror
Tactical RPG	Tactical role-playing game	Tactical shooter	Tactical shooter	TBS	Turn-based strategy
TBT	Turn-based tactics	Tower defense	Tower defense	TPS	Third-person shooter
Vehicle sim	Vehicle simulation game	Vehicular combat	Vehicular combat game	Visual novel	Visual novel

=== January-March ===
Release date	Title	Platform	Genre	Ref.
January 3	Wind and Water: Puzzle Battles	WIN	Puzzle	
January 4	Arc the Lad III	PSN	Tactical RPG	
January 4	Hot Shots Shorties	PSP	Sports	
January 4	Lost in Shadow	Wii	Puzzle-platformer	
January 6	Bug Heroes	iOS, DROID	Shooter	
January 10	Prinny 2: Dawn of Operation Panties, Dood!	PSP	Platformer	
January 10	Z-Type	WEB	Shoot 'em up	
January 11	DC Universe Online	WIN, PS3	Action, MMO	
January 11	Ghost Trick: Phantom Detective	DS	Adventure, Puzzle	
January 11	Kingdom Hearts Re:coded	DS	Action RPG	
January 12	Zeit²	WIN, XB360	Shoot 'em up	
January 17	Urbanix	Wii	Puzzle	
January 18	LittleBigPlanet 2	PS3	Puzzle-platformer	
January 18	Mass Effect 2	PS3	Action RPG, TPS	
January 18	MindJack	PS3, XB360	TPS	
January 18	Venetica	WIN, XB360, PS3	Action RPG	
January 24	Monday Night Combat	WIN	MOBA, TPS	
January 25	Dead Space 2	WIN, XB360, PS3	Survival horror	
January 25	Lord of Arcana	PSP	Action RPG	
January 25	Magicka	WIN	Action-adventure	
January 25	Superstars V8 Next Challenge	WIN, PS3, XB360	Racing	
January 25	Two Worlds II	WIN, XB360, PS3	Action RPG	
January 26	Blast Monkeys	iOS	Puzzle	
January 26	Breach	WIN, XB360	FPS	
January 26	Shining Force II	WIN	Tactical RPG	
January 27	Hysteria Project 2	WIN	Adventure, Survival horror, FMV	
January 27	Infinity Field	iOS	Shooter	
February 1	Bionic Commando Rearmed 2	PS3	Run and gun	
February 1	Rock Band Country Track Pack 2	PS3, Wii, XB360	Music	
February 1	The Sims 3: Outdoor Living Stuff	OSX, WIN	Social sim	
February 2	Bionic Commando Rearmed 2	XB360	Run and gun	
February 4	Earthrise	WIN	MMO, RPG	
February 7	Mario Sports Mix	Wii	Sports	
February 8	Battle High: San Bruno	WIN, XB360		
February 8	Body and Brain Connection	XB360		
February 8	Explodemon	PSN		
February 8	Naruto Shippuden: Shinobi Rumble	DS		
February 8	OMG-Z	PSP		
February 8	Stacking	PS3		
February 8	Tales from Space: About a Blob	PSN		
February 8	Test Drive Unlimited 2	WIN, XB360, PS3		
February 8	TNT Racers	XB360		
February 8	Trinity: Souls of Zill O'll	PS3		
February 8	You Don't Know Jack	WIN, DS, PS3, Wii, XB360		
February 9	Stacking	XB360		
February 10	Dungeons	WIN		
February 10	NBA Jam	iOS		
February 12	Ys I & II Chronicles	PSP		
February 14	Dragon Quest VI: Realms of Revelation	DS		
February 15	Back to the Future: The Game	PSN		
February 15	Hyperdimension Neptunia	PS3		
February 15	Marvel vs. Capcom 3: Fate of Two Worlds	XB360, PS3		
February 15	Tactics Ogre: Let Us Cling Together	PSP		
February 16	Hard Corps: Uprising	XB360		
February 17	Asphalt 6: Adrenaline	OSX		
February 22	Bulletstorm	WIN, XB360, PS3		
February 22	Days of Thunder	PSN		
February 22	de Blob 2	DS, PS3, XB360, Wii		
February 22	Giana Sisters DS	DS		
February 22	Gray Matter	WIN, XB360		
February 22	Killzone 3	PS3		
February 22	Knights Contract	XB360, PS3		
February 22	Radiant Historia	DS		
February 23	Cities in Motion	WIN		
February 25	Days of Thunder	XB360		
February 25	Men of War: Assault Squad	WIN		
March 1	Fight Night Champion	iOS, PS3, XB360		
March 1	PixelJunk Shooter 2	PS3		
March 1	Rift	WIN		
March 1	Warhammer 40,000: Dawn of War II – Retribution	WIN		
March 6	Pokémon Black and White (NA)	DS		
March 8	Atari Greatest Hits Volume 2	DS		
March 8	Dragon Age II	WIN, PS3, XB360		
March 8	Major League Baseball 2K11	WIN, PS3, PS2, PSP, XB360, Wii		
March 8	Mega Man 3	PSN		
March 8	MLB 11: The Show	PS3, PS2, PSP		
March 8	R4: Ridge Racer Type 4	PSN		
March 10	Beastly: Frantic Foto	DS		
March 11	Stoked	WIN		
March 15	Ar tonelico Qoga: Knell of Ar Ciel	PS3		
March 15	Cloning Clyde	WIN		
March 15	Gods Eater Burst	PSP		
March 15	Hard Corps: Uprising	PS3		
March 15	Homefront	WIN, XB360, PS3		
March 15	Jikandia: The Timeless Land	PSP		
March 15	Ōkamiden	DS		
March 15	Slam Bolt Scrappers	PSN		
March 15	Top Spin 4	PS3, XB360, Wii		
March 15	Total War: Shogun 2	WIN		
March 15	Warriors: Legends of Troy	XB360, PS3		
March 15	Yakuza 4	PS3		
March 17	Dance on Broadway	PS3		
March 22	Angry Birds Rio	OSX, iOS		
March 22	Assassin's Creed: Brotherhood	WIN		
March 22	Crysis 2	WIN, PS3, XB360		
March 22	Dissidia 012 Final Fantasy	PSP		
March 22	Forget-Me-Not	iOS		
March 22	Lego Star Wars III: The Clone Wars	WIN, XB360, PS3, PSP, Wii, DS		
March 22	Monster Tale	DS		
March 22	Naruto Shippuden: Kizuna Drive	PSP		
March 22	PlayStation Move Heroes	PS3		
March 22	The Sims Medieval	WIN, OSX		
March 22	Swarm	PSN		
March 22	The Tomb Raider Trilogy	PS3		
March 23	Elsword (NA)	WIN		
March 23	Ghostbusters: Sanctum of Slime	WIN, XB360, PSN		
March 23	Swarm	XB360		
March 24	Final Fantasy III	iOS		
March 26	Great Little War Game	iOS		
March 27	Asphalt 3D	3DS		
March 27	Bust-A-Move Universe	3DS		
March 27	Combat of Giants: Dinosaurs 3D	3DS		
March 27	Lego Star Wars III: The Clone Wars	3DS		
March 27	Madden NFL Football	3DS		
March 27	Nintendogs + Cats	3DS		
March 27	Pilotwings Resort	3DS		
March 27	Pro Evolution Soccer 2011	3DS		
March 27	Rayman 3D	3DS		
March 27	Ridge Racer 3D	3DS		
March 27	Samurai Warriors: Chronicles	3DS		
March 27	The Sims 3	3DS		
March 27	Steel Diver	3DS		
March 27	Super Monkey Ball 3D	3DS		
March 27	Super Street Fighter IV: 3D Edition	3DS		
March 27	Tom Clancy's Ghost Recon: Shadow Wars	3DS		
March 29	The 3rd Birthday	PSP		
March 29	Chime Super Deluxe	PSN		
March 29	Dynasty Warriors 7	PS3, XB360		
March 29	Johnny Test	DS		
March 29	The Legend of Heroes: Trails in the Sky	PSP		
March 29	NASCAR The Game: 2011	XB360, PS3, Wii		
March 29	Rush'n Attack: Ex-Patriot	PSN		
March 29	Shift 2: Unleashed	WIN, PS3, XB360		
March 29	Tiger Woods PGA Tour 12	PS3, XB360, Wii		
March 29	WWE All Stars	PS2, PS3, PSP, XB360, Wii		
March 30	Islands of Wakfu	XB360		
March 30	Rush'n Attack: Ex-Patriot	XB360		
March 31	TNT Racers	PSP, Wii		

=== April–June ===
Release date	Title	Platform	Genre	Ref.
April 3	Dungeon Hunter: Alliance	PSN		
April 4	Absolute Baseball	DS		
April 4	Spiral Knights	WIN		
April 6	The Dishwasher: Vampire Smile	XB360		
April 8	Anomaly: Warzone Earth	WIN		
April 10	Rabbids: Travel In Time 3D	3DS		
April 10	SpongeBob SquigglePants	Wii		
April 10	Tom Clancy's Splinter Cell: Chaos Theory	3DS		
April 11	Limbo	XB360		
April 12	Divinity II: The Dragon Knight Saga	X360		
April 12	Lego Battles: Ninjago	DS		
April 12	Michael Jackson: The Experience	XB360, PS3		
April 12	Might & Magic: Clash of Heroes	PS3		
April 12	Patapon 3	PSP		
April 12	Rio	PS3, XB360, DS, Wii		
April 12	World of Tanks	WIN		
April 14	Resident Evil: Mercenaries Vs.	iOS		
April 17	Tom Clancy's Rainbow Six: Shadow Vanguard	iOS		
April 19	Arcana Heart 3	PS3		
April 19	Conduit 2	Wii		
April 19	Fancy Pants Adventures	PSN		
April 19	Final Fantasy IV: The Complete Collection	PSP		
April 19	Mad Blocker Alpha	PS3, PSP		
April 19	Mortal Kombat	PS3, XB360		
April 19	Portal 2	WIN, OSX, PS3, XB360		
April 19	SOCOM 4: U.S. Navy SEALs	PS3		
April 20	Fancy Pants Adventures	XB360		
April 24	Dream Chronicles: The Book of Water	WIN		
April 26	Darkspore	WIN		
April 26	Man vs. Wild	PS3, Wii, XB360		
April 27	Hector: Badge of Carnage - Episode 1	WIN		
April 27	Outland	XB360		
April 28	Zenonia 3	iOS		
May 3	MotorStorm: Apocalypse	PS3		
May 3	Mount&Blade: With Fire & Sword	WIN		
May 3	Thor: God of Thunder	XB360, PS3, Wii, DS		
May 4	First Touch Soccer	iOS		
May 9	Mighty Milky Way	DS		
May 10	Brink	WIN, PS3, XB360		
May 10	Dream Trigger 3D	3DS		
May 10	The First Templar	WIN, XB360		
May 10	Hydrophobia Prophecy	WIN		
May 10	Lego Pirates of the Caribbean: The Video Game	3DS, XB360, PS3, Wii, PSP, DS		
May 10	MX vs. ATV Alive	XB360, PS3		
May 10	Virtua Tennis 4	XB360, PS3, Wii		
May 10	Yu-Gi-Oh! 5D's World Championship 2011: Over the Nexus	DS		
May 11	Gatling Gears	XB360		
May 16	Terraria	WIN		
May 17	Battle vs. Chess	WIN, DS, PS3, PSP, Wii, XB360		
May 17	Deathsmiles II	XB360		
May 17	Fable III	WIN		
May 17	L.A. Noire	PS3, XB360		
May 17	SpongeBob SquigglePants	3DS		
May 17	The Witcher 2: Assassins of Kings	WIN		
May 18	Sega Rally Online Arcade	XB360		
May 19	TNA Wrestling Impact!	DROID, iOS		
May 24	Dead or Alive: Dimensions	3DS		
May 24	Dirt 3	WIN, XB360, PS3		
May 24	Kung Fu Panda 2	PS3, XB360, Wii, DS		
May 24	Lego Pirates of the Caribbean: The Video Game	WIN		
May 25	Dungeons & Dragons: Daggerdale	WIN, XB360		
May 26	Frozen Synapse	WIN		
May 28	Akane the Kunoichi	XB360		
May 30	FAST - Racing League	Wii		
May 31	BlazBlue: Continuum Shift II	3DS		
May 31	Hunted: The Demon's Forge	WIN, PS3, XB360		
May 31	The Sims 3: Generations	WIN, OSX		
June 1	Days of Thunder	PSP		
June 1	Robo Surf	iOS, DROID		
June 2	Armageddon Riders	PSN		
June 2	Feed Me Oil	iOS		
June 2	Under Siege	PS3		
June 6	Duke Nukem: Critical Mass	DS		
June 7	3D Classics: Excitebike	3DS		
June 7	Cartoon Network: Punch Time Explosion	3DS		
June 7	Green Lantern: Rise of the Manhunters	PS3, XB360, Wii, DS, 3DS		
June 7	inFamous 2	PS3		
June 7	Operation Flashpoint: Red River	WIN, XB360, PS3		
June 7	Red Faction: Armageddon	WIN, XB360, PS3		
June 8	Jamestown: Legend of the Lost Colony	WIN		
June 9	Dreamscape	iOS		
June 10	Zoo Keeper	iOS		
June 13	Wii Play: Motion	Wii		
June 14	Alice: Madness Returns	WIN, PS3, XB360		
June 14	Child of Eden	XB360		
June 14	Cubic Ninja	3DS		
June 14	Duke Nukem Forever	WIN, PS3, XB360		
June 14	Outland	PSN		
June 14	Transformers: Dark of the Moon	XB360, PS3, Wii, DS, 3DS		
June 14	Wipeout in the Zone	XB360		
June 15	Akimi Village	PSN		
June 15	Fightin' Words	DROID, BBOS		
June 16	Sodium 2: Project Velocity	PSN		
June 18	Sonic & Sega All-Stars Racing	iOS		
June 19	The Legend of Zelda: Ocarina of Time 3D	3DS		
June 21	Alien Zombie Megadeath	WIN, PS3		
June 21	Cars 2	WIN, XB360, PS3, Wii, DS, 3DS, PSP		
June 21	DualPenSports	3DS		
June 21	Dungeon Siege III	WIN, XB360, PS3		
June 21	F.E.A.R. 3	WIN, XB360, PS3		
June 21	Shadows of the Damned	PS3, XB360		
June 22	Lucha Fury	XB360		
June 23	1-Bit Ninja	iOS		
June 25	The Adventures of Shuggy	XB360		
June 28	Async Corp.	iOS		
June 28	Beyond Good & Evil HD	PSN		
June 28	Dynasty Warriors: Gundam 3	PS3, XB360		
June 28	Gatling Gears	PSN		
June 28	Nancy Drew: The Captive Curse	WIN, OSX		
June 28	Reel Fishing Paradise 3D	3DS		
June 28	Resident Evil: The Mercenaries 3D	3DS		
June 28	Sniper: Ghost Warrior	PS3		
June 29	Backbreaker: Vengeance	XB360		
June 29	Galaga Legions DX	XB360		
June 29	Half-Minute Hero: Super Mega Neo Climax	XB360		
June 30	Ascension: Chronicle of the Godslayer	iOS		
June 30	James Pond in the Deathly Shallows	iOS		

=== July–September ===
Release date	Title	Platform	Genre	Ref.
July 5	Earth Defense Force: Insect Armageddon	PS3, XB360		
July 5	PlayStation Move Ape Escape	PS3		
July 6	Ant Raid	iOS		
July 7	Deathsmiles	iOS		
July 7	The King of Fighters-i	iOS		
July 7	Wicked Monsters Blast!	Wii		
July 11	Ms. Splosion Man	XB360		
July 11	Panzer Corps	WIN		
July 12	Harry Potter and the Deathly Hallows – Part 2	WIN, XB360, PS3, Wii, DS		
July 12	Mighty Flip Champs! DX	PSN		
July 12	NCAA Football 12	XB360, PS3		
July 13	Boulder Dash-XL	XB360		
July 14	Call of Juarez: The Cartel	PS3, XB360		
July 14	Captain America: Super Soldier	XB360, PS3, Wii, DS		
July 14	Puyo Puyo!! 20th Anniversary	PSP, Wii, DS, 3DS		
July 18	Sweatshop	OSX, WIN		
July 19	Final Fantasy Tactics: The War of the Lions	PSP		
July 19	Just Dance: Summer Party	Wii		
July 19	Limbo	PSN		
July 19	The Smurfs Dance Party	Wii		
July 20	Bastion	XB360		
July 21	3D Classics: Xevious	3DS		
July 21	Wooords	DROID, iOS		
July 23	Galaga 30th Collection	iOS		
July 26	Catherine	PS3, XB360		
July 26	Pac-Man & Galaga Dimensions	3DS		
July 26	The Sims 3 Town Life Stuff	OSX, WIN		
July 27	Cordy	iOS		
July 27	From Dust	XB360		
July 28	Groove Coaster	iOS		
July 30	Chantelise – A Tale of Two Sisters	WIN		
August 2	Bleach: Soul Resurrección	PS3		
August 2	Galaga Legions DX	PSN		
August 2	Limbo	WIN		
August 3	Insanely Twisted Shadow Planet	XB360		
August 3	Serious Sam Double D	WIN		
August 4	Cut the Rope: Experiments	iOS		
August 4	Shift 2: Unleashed	iOS		
August 4	Temple Run	iOS		
August 11	Anomaly: Warzone Earth	iOS		
August 11	Go! Go! Kokopolo - Harmonious Forest Revenge	DS		
August 11	One Epic Game	iOS, PSN, PSP		
August 11	Strong Bad's Cool Game for Attractive People: Episode 1 - Homestar Ruiner	WIN, Wii		
August 15	Wonderputt	WEB		
August 16	Age of Empires Online	WIN		
August 16	Bastion	WIN		
August 16	El Shaddai: Ascension of the Metatron	PS3, XB360		
August 16	No More Heroes: Heroes' Paradise	PS3		
August 17	From Dust	WIN		
August 17	Konami Krazy Racers	DROID		
August 17	Toy Soldiers: Cold War	WIN, XB360		
August 18	3D Classics: Urban Champion	3DS		
August 18	Duke Nukem Forever	OSX		
August 18	Flight Control	Wii		
August 23	Deus Ex: Human Revolution	WIN, PS3, XB360		
August 23	Hysteria Project 2	PSN		
August 23	Shin Megami Tensei: Devil Survivor Overclocked	3DS		
August 25	Hector: Badge of Carnage - Episode 2	WIN, iOS		
August 25	Spy Mouse	iOS, DROID, WP		
August 26	Rugby World Cup 2011	XB360, PS3		
August 29	Achron	WIN, OSX, LIN		
August 30	The Baconing	PSN		
August 30	Bodycount	PS3, XB360		
August 30	Driver: Renegade 3D	3DS		
August 30	Gatling Gears	WIN		
August 30	Madden NFL 12	PS2, PS3, PSP, XB360, Wii, iOS		
August 30	Mortal Kombat Arcade Kollection	PSN		
August 30	Tropico 4	WIN		
August 30	Ugly Americans: Apocalypsegeddon	PSN		
August 31	The Baconing	XB360		
August 31	Mortal Kombat Arcade Kollection	XB360		
August 31	Rock of Ages	WIN, XB360, PSN		
August 31	Ugly Americans: Apocalypsegeddon	XB360		
September 1	Wasteland Angel	WIN		
September 6	Alpha Mission	PS3, PSP		
September 6	BloodRayne: Betrayal	PS3		
September 6	Dawn of Fantasy	WIN		
September 6	Dead Island	WIN, XB360, PS3		
September 6	Disgaea 4: A Promise Unforgotten	PS3		
September 6	Driver: San Francisco	PS3, XB360, Wii		
September 6	Mega Man 4	PSN		
September 6	Resistance 3	PS3		
September 6	Rise of Nightmares	XB360		
September 6	Techno Kitten Adventure	XB360		
September 6	Warhammer 40,000: Space Marine	WIN, XB360, PS3		
September 7	BloodRayne: Betrayal	XB360		
September 7	Crimson Alliance	XB360		
September 8	Grand Prix Story	iOS		
September 9	Star Fox 64 3D	3DS		
September 12	Rise of Immortals	WIN		
September 13	Bit.Trip Saga	3DS		
September 13	Call of Juarez: The Cartel	WIN		
September 13	God of War: Origins Collection	PS3		
September 13	The Gunstringer	XB360		
September 13	Hard Reset	WIN		
September 13	Harvest Moon: The Tale of Two Towns	DS		
September 13	NHL 12	PS3, XB360		
September 13	Nicktoons MLB	XB360, Wii, DS		
September 13	Pucca Power Up	DS		
September 13	Red Orchestra 2: Heroes of Stalingrad	WIN		
September 13	Sengoku: Way of the Warrior	WIN		
September 13	Thor: God of Thunder	3DS		
September 13	White Knight Chronicles II	PS3		
September 14	Radiant Silvergun	XB360		
September 14	Renegade Ops	XB360		
September 14	TrackMania 2: Canyon	WIN		
September 15	Monsters Ate My Condo	iOS		
September 19	Dragon Quest Monsters: Joker 2	DS		
September 19	Kirby Mass Attack	DS		
September 20	Burnout Crash!	PSN		
September 20	F1 2011	WIN, XB360, PS3		
September 20	Frogger 3D	3DS		
September 20	Gears of War 3	XB360		
September 20	Persona 2: Innocent Sin	PSP		
September 20	Resident Evil 4 HD	PS3, XB360		
September 21	Burnout Crash!	XB360		
September 22	3D Classics: TwinBee	3DS		
September 22	Hector: Badge of Carnage - Episode 3	WIN, iOS		
September 23	Pinball Hall of Fame: The Williams Collection	3DS		
September 26	Nuclear Dawn	WIN, OSX		
September 27	Atelier Totori: Alchemist of Arland 2	PS3		
September 27	Brunswick Pro Bowling	3DS		
September 27	Child of Eden	PS3		
September 27	Driver: San Francisco	WIN		
September 27	FIFA 12	WIN, PS3, XB360, Wii, PS2, PSP, 3DS, iOS		
September 27	The Ico & Shadow of the Colossus Collection	PS3		
September 27	Pro Evolution Soccer 2012	WIN, PS3, XB360, Wii, PSP, 3DS, PS2		
September 27	Resident Evil Code: Veronica X	PS3, XB360		
September 27	Rune Factory: Tides of Destiny	PS3, Wii		
September 27	Solatorobo: Red the Hunter	DS		
September 27	Tom Clancy's Splinter Cell Classic Trilogy HD	PS3		
September 27	X-Men: Destiny	PS3, Wii, XB360, DS		
September 28	The Binding of Isaac	WIN		
September 28	Worms Ultimate Mayhem	WIN, XB360		
September 29	A Game of Thrones: Genesis	WIN		
September 29	Katamari Amore	iOS		
September 29	Shadowgun	iOS		
September 29	Wizorb	XB360		
September 30	Go! Go! Nippon!	WIN	Visual novel	
September 30	Unepic	WIN		

=== October–December ===
Release date	Title	Platform	Genre	Ref.
October 2	Tetris: Axis	3DS		
October 4	Dark Souls	PS3, XB360		
October 4	Eufloria	PSN		
October 4	God Hand	PSN		
October 4	NBA 2K12	WIN, PS3, XB360, Wii, PSP, PS2		
October 4	Rage	WIN, PS3, XB360		
October 4	Space Channel 5: Part 2	PSN		
October 4	Spider-Man: Edge of Time	XB360, PS3, Wii, DS, 3DS		
October 5	Orcs Must Die!	XB360		
October 7	Just Dance 3	Wii, PS3, XB360		
October 11	Ace Combat: Assault Horizon	PS3, XB360		
October 11	Aliens Infestation	DS		
October 11	Dead Rising 2: Off the Record	WIN, PS3, XB360		
October 11	Forza Motorsport 4	XB360		
October 11	Hulk Hogan's Main Event	XB360		
October 11	Scribblenauts Remix	iOS		
October 11	Sesame Street: Once Upon a Monster	XB360		
October 12	Guardian Heroes	XB360		
October 12	MDK2 HD	WIN		
October 12	Orcs Must Die!	WIN		
October 13	Might and Magic Heroes VI	WIN		
October 14	Gem Keeper	iOS		
October 16	Skylanders: Spyro's Adventure	WIN, 3DS, PS3, Wii, XB360		
October 18	Batman: Arkham City	PS3, XB360		
October 18	Beat Hazard Ultra	PS3		
October 18	Ben 10: Galactic Racing	PS3, XB360, DS, Wii, 3DS		
October 18	Dungeon Defenders	PSN		
October 18	Everybody Dance	PS3		
October 18	JASF: Jane's Advanced Strike Fighters	WIN, PS3, XB360		
October 18	Nancy Drew: Alibi in Ashes	WIN, OSX		
October 18	Okabu	PS3		
October 18	Payday: The Heist	PSN		
October 18	PowerUp Heroes	XB360		
October 18	Ratchet & Clank: All 4 One	PS3		
October 18	Rocketbirds: Hardboiled Chicken	PS3		
October 18	Rocksmith	PS3, XB360		
October 18	The Sims 3: Pets	OSX, WIN		
October 18	Tropico 4	XB360		
October 19	Dungeon Defenders	WIN, XB360		
October 20	Cities XL 2012	WIN		
October 20	Fruit Ninja: Puss in Boots	iOS		
October 20	Payday: The Heist	WIN		
October 20	Rugby Challenge	WIN, PS3, XB360		
October 21	FIFA Manager 12	WIN		
October 21	Football Manager 2012	WIN, OSX		
October 24	Kirby's Return to Dream Land	Wii		
October 24	Serious Sam: The Random Encounter	WIN		
October 25	Arcania: Fall of Setarrif	WIN		
October 25	Battlefield 3	WIN, PS3, XB360		
October 25	Blackwater	XB360		
October 25	Captain America: Super Soldier	3DS		
October 25	Centipede: Infestation	Wii		
October 25	The Cursed Crusade	WIN, PS3, XB360		
October 25	Dance Central 2	XB360		
October 25	Disney Universe	WIN, OSX, Wii, PS3, XB360		
October 25	House of the Dead: Overkill	PS3		
October 25	Infamous: Festival of Blood	PS3		
October 25	Invizimals: Shadow Zone	PSP		
October 25	Just Dance Kids 2	PS3, Wii, XB360		
October 25	PixelJunk SideScroller	PS3		
October 25	Puss in Boots	PS3, DS, Wii, XB360		
October 25	Stronghold 3	WIN		
October 26	Renegade Ops	WIN		
October 26	Shadowgun	WIN		
October 27	Modern Combat 3: Fallen Nation	iOS		
October 27	Shantae: Risky's Revenge	iOS		
October 28	Sword of the Stars II: The Lords of Winter	WIN		
November 1	Cabela's Adventure Camp	PS3, Wii, XB360		
November 1	Cabela's Survival: Shadows of Katmai	Wii, PS3, XB360		
November 1	Cars 2	3DS		
November 1	Centipede: Infestation	3DS		
November 1	Disney Princess: Enchanting Storybooks	DS, Wii		
November 1	GoldenEye 007 Reloaded	PS3, XB360		
November 1	Harvest Moon: The Tale of Two Towns	3DS		
November 1	Hydrophobia Prophecy	PS3		
November 1	James Noir's Hollywood Crimes	3DS		
November 1	Jimmie Johnson's Anything with an Engine	PS3, Wii, XB360		
November 1	The Lord of the Rings: War in the North	WIN, PS3, XB360		
November 1	NASCAR Unleashed	PS3, XB360, 3DS, Wii		
November 1	Pac-Man Party 3D	3DS		
November 1	Raving Rabbids: Alive & Kicking	XB360		
November 1	Sonic Generations	PS3, XB360		
November 1	Team Umizoomi	DS		
November 1	To the Moon	WIN		
November 1	Twister Mania	XB360		
November 1	Uncharted 3: Drake's Deception	PS3		
November 2	BurgerTime: World Tour	XB360		
November 2	Escape Goat	WIN, XB360		
November 4	Sonic Generations	WIN		
November 4	Stealth Bastard	WIN		
November 8	The Black Eyed Peas Experience	XB360		
November 8	Call of Duty: Modern Warfare 3	WIN, PS3, XB360, Wii		
November 8	Call of Duty: Modern Warfare 3: Defiance	DS		
November 8	Cars 2	PSP		
November 8	Cave Story 3D	3DS		
November 8	Deepak Chopra's Leela	Wii, XB360		
November 8	Happy Feet Two: The Video Game	3DS, DS, PS3, Wii, XB360		
November 8	L.A. Noire	WIN		
November 8	Max & the Magic Marker	DS		
November 8	Metal Gear Solid HD Collection	PS3, XB360		
November 8	Michael Jackson: The Experience	3DS		
November 8	Nickelodeon Dance	Wii, XB360		
November 8	Otomedius Excellent	XB360		
November 8	Self-Defense Training Camp	XB360		
November 8	SpongeBob's Surf & Skate Roadtrip	DS, XB360		
November 10	Freakyforms: Your Creations, Alive!	3DS		
November 10	Gangstar Rio: City of Saints	iOS		
November 11	The Elder Scrolls V: Skyrim	WIN, PS3, XB360		
November 11	Lego Harry Potter: Years 5–7	WIN, XB360, PS3, PSP, Wii, DS, 3DS, iOS		
November 13	Super Mario 3D Land	3DS		
November 15	ABBA: You Can Dance	Wii		
November 15	Alvin and the Chipmunks: Chipwrecked	DS, Wii, XB360		
November 15	Assassin's Creed: Revelations	PS3, XB360		
November 15	Beyblade: Metal Masters	DS		
November 15	BurgerTime World Tour	PS3		
November 15	Carnival Island	PS3		
November 15	Cartoon Network: Punch Time Explosion XL	Wii, PS3, XB360		
November 15	DreamWorks Super Star Kartz	3DS, DS, PS3, Wii, XB360		
November 15	Dynasty Warriors 7: Xtreme Legends	WIN, PS3		
November 15	Fossil Fighters: Champions	DS		
November 15	Halo: Combat Evolved Anniversary	XB360		
November 15	Jurassic Park: The Game	WIN, PS3, XB360		
November 15	Kinect Disneyland Adventures	XB360		
November 15	Kung-Fu High Impact	XB360		
November 15	Mario & Sonic at the London 2012 Olympic Games	Wii		
November 15	Marvel Super Hero Squad: Comic Combat	PS3, Wii, XB360		
November 15	Medieval Moves: Deadmund's Quest	PS3		
November 15	Need for Speed: The Run	WIN, PS3, Wii, XB360, 3DS		
November 15	Rayman Origins	PS3, XB360, Wii		
November 15	Rochard	WIN		
November 15	Saints Row: The Third	WIN, XB360, PS3		
November 15	Shinobi	3DS		
November 15	Ultimate Marvel vs. Capcom 3	PS3, XB360		
November 16	Cooking Mama 4: Kitchen Magic	3DS		
November 17	3D Classics: Kirby's Adventure	3DS		
November 17	Anno 2070	WIN		
November 17	Minecraft	iOS		
November 18	Minecraft	WIN, LIN, OSX		
November 20	The Legend of Zelda: Skyward Sword	Wii		
November 21	Fate/Extra	PSP		
November 22	Batman: Arkham City	WIN		
November 22	Cave Story+	WIN		
November 22	Corpse Party	PSP		
November 22	The King of Fighters XIII	PS3, XB360		
November 22	Serious Sam 3: BFE	WIN		
November 22	Sonic Generations	3DS		
November 22	Tekken Hybrid	PS3		
November 22	WWE 12	PS3, Wii, XB360		
November 22	WWE All Stars	3DS		
November 25	Afterfall: InSanity	WIN, XB360, PS3		
November 25	F1 2011	3DS		
December 1	Assassin's Creed: Revelations	WIN		
December 1	Infinity Blade II	iOS		
December 4	Mario Kart 7	3DS		
December 5	Fortune Street	Wii		
December 6	The Adventures of Tintin: The Game	WIN, PS3, XB360, Wii, 3DS		
December 6	Defenders of Ardania	iOS		
December 6	Doctor Lautrec and the Forgotten Knights	3DS		
December 6	Face Racers: Photo Finish	3DS		
December 6	Final Fantasy VI	PSN		
December 6	The Oregon Trail	3DS, Wii		
December 6	Wanted Corp	PSN		
December 7	Batman: Arkham City Lockdown	iOS		
December 7	Michael Jackson: The Experience	iOS		
December 7	Trine 2	WIN, OSX		
December 8	Chrono Trigger	iOS		
December 8	Pushmo	3DS		
December 9	Shake It Up	Wii		
December 13	FlatOut 3: Chaos & Destruction	WIN		
December 13	Outdoors Unleashed: Africa 3D	3DS		
December 15	Earth Defense Force: Insect Armageddon	WIN		
December 15	Grand Theft Auto III: 10 Year Anniversary Edition	iOS, DROID		
December 15	The Sims FreePlay	iOS		
December 15	Snoticles	iOS		
December 15	Sonic CD	iOS		
December 16	Fire Emblem: The Sacred Stones	3DS		
December 16	Metroid Fusion	3DS		
December 16	Satazius	WIN		
December 16	Wario Land 4	3DS		
December 17	Jurassic Park: The Game - Episode 2: The Cavalry	iOS		
December 17	Shin Kamaitachi no Yoru	PS3, PSV	Visual novel	
December 19	Metal Dead	WIN		
December 20	Postal III	WIN		
December 20	Star Wars: The Old Republic	WIN		
December 20	Trine 2	PSN		
December 21	LostWinds	iOS		
December 21	Mega Man X	iOS		
December 21	Trine 2	XB360		
December 22	Mighty Switch Force!	3DS		
December 27	All Zombies Must Die!	PSN		
December 27	Oddworld: Stranger's Wrath HD	PSN		
December 29	VVVVVV	3DS		

== Video game-based film and television releases ==
Title	Date	Director	Distributor(s)	Franchise	Original game publisher	Ref.
Best Player	March 13, 2011	Damon Santostefano	Nickelodeon	—N/a	—N/a	
Mortal Kombat: Legacy	April 11, 2011	Kevin Tancharoen	Machinima, Inc.	Mortal Kombat	Midway Games	
Victini and Reshiram/Victini and Zekrom	July 16, 2011	Kunihiko Yuyama	Toho	Pokémon	Game Freak	
Tekken: Blood Vengeance	July 26, 2011	Yōichi Mōri	Asmik Ace	Tekken	Bandai Namco	
Dragon Age: Redemption	October 10, 2011	Peter Winther	—N/a	Dragon Age	BioWare	
Assassin's Creed: Embers	November 15, 2011	Laurent Bernier	Ubisoft	Assassin's Creed	Ubisoft	

== See also ==
- 2011 in esports
- 2011 in games
