= Dreamscape (video game) =

2011 video game

dream:scape
- App Store icon
- Developer: Speedbump Studios
- Publisher: Speedbump Studios
- Programmer: George Lippert
- Writers: George Lippert, Jane Kalmes
- Composer: Isaias Garcia
- Engine: Unreal Engine 3
- Platforms: iOS, Android
- Release: WW: June 9, 2011
- Genres: Adventure, Puzzle
- Mode: Single-player

Dreamscape (stylized as dream:scape) is a 2011 first-person adventure video game, with puzzle elements, developed and published by American studio Speedbump Studios. It was released worldwide on June 9, 2011 for iOS devices exclusively. The game does not follow traditional video game conventions, as it involves minimal interaction from the player and does not require choices to be made, and there are only basic puzzles for the player to complete. It instead places focus on its story, which is told through the perspective of a man called Wilson, who is caught in the limbo between life and death. Moments before his death, Wilson is transported to his own Dreamscape and is allowed to relive all his memories for one last time. While there he finally discovers the truth as to why his fiancee, Amelia, disappeared on the day of their wedding.

Dreamscape was developed over the course of three months by George Lippert, who also co-wrote the game's script and voiced all male characters. Carol Mertz and Lippert's son Zane provided the voices for all other characters. Lippert designed the game around a 3D cabin model he made while learning to use the Unreal Engine. While the game was initially set to be released in April 2011, the release date was pushed back two months in order to fix a memory bug that prevented it from running on certain devices.

Upon release Dreamscape received "mixed or average" reviews, according to video game review score aggregator Metacritic. Reviewers generally praised the narrative and sound design, but criticized the uninspiring gameplay and repetitive nature of the game. It also became the second game to run on iOS devices using Unreal Engine 3 after 2010's Infinity Blade.

== Gameplay ==
Players are allowed to explore a thirty-acre, open-world environment.

Dreamscape is an adventure game, with puzzle elements, played from the first-person perspective. In order to control the protagonist, Wilson, players use virtual touchscreen controls. The controls feature an analog stick on both sides of the screen, with the latter used for movement and the former used for camera controls. Players can also move the camera by swiping across the screen with their finger.

Players have to complete various puzzles in order to gain access to previously restricted areas. The majority of these puzzles require players to retrieve an object from a certain location in order to bypass an obstacle in another location. For example, an early puzzle involves locating a key in order to open the locked door for a cabin. Occasionally puzzles take the form of a quick time event (QTE), in which players must swipe across the screen in a certain direction in a short span of time, or else the puzzle is failed and must be retried. Players can only complete puzzles in a certain order, meaning the game world opens up gradually as the story progresses. Upon completion of the story a free roam option is unlocked, allowing players to freely explore the game world.

At the start of Dreamscape players are given a diary, in which most of the pages are empty except for titles at the top of each page. The titles themselves are named after all the locations that can be visited throughout the game world, and as such players can use this to work out where they have to go to next. As the story processes the pages of the diary slowly fill up, giving extra information about the locations found in the game. It also provides back story to not only the main character, Wilson, but to the other characters as well. The diary also contains a map, which is designed to help players navigate the thirty acre world.

== Synopsis ==
=== Setting ===
Dreamscape takes place within the mind of a brain dead patient called Wilson, as he explores all of his memories for one last time before he dies. This place is itself called a Dreamscape, of which everyone experiences their own just before they die. Everyone's Dreamscape is slightly different to reflect their own life and personality, so someone who led a peaceful life would have their Dreamscape represented by a large rural area for instance. Wilson's own Dreamscape takes place in his home town of Bastion Falls and the surrounding countryside.

=== Characters ===
The main character of Dreamscape, whom the player controls, is Wilson, a former pilot who is currently a brain dead patient with only a few hours left to live. Since his childhood he has been good friends with Amelia (Carol Mertz), who dreamt of becoming a ballet dancer all her life. When Wilson proposed to her years later she was forced to abandon this dream, which greatly upset her, although she tried to keep this a secret from him. The two were good friends with Frank Dodd (George Lippert), who similarly wanted to be a pilot since a young age. While he was initially happy for Wilson and Amelia, he soon became jealous of their upcoming wedding as he secretly loved Amelia too. Other characters include Lawrence (George Lippert)—Amelia's overprotective father who never got over the death of his wife years earlier; and Reverend Grant (George Lippert)—the local priest who was set to perform Wilson's ill-fated wedding.

=== Plot ===
Despite being a brain dead patient who only has hours to live, Wilson wakes up in his own Dreamscape and is met by the Scarecrow Guide. She informs him of where he is and allows him to explore his memories for one last time, but warns him that memories are not always good. Upon finding a hidden key inside a tree that he had put there in his childhood, Wilson opens the door to a nearby cabin. Inside he discovers old drawings he and his friend Amelia had made when they were children. He remembers that she made him promise to fly her away from here when they grew up so she could go to the Big City. Wilson then explores a nearby barn, in which he and Amelia had kissed for the first time.

Wilson then remembers about Amelia's father, Lawrence; a drunk who has been overprotective of his daughter since her mother died. Lawrence hated Wilson, fearing that he will take away his daughter some day. After arriving at the river, Wilson recalls many summers he spent here, along with Amelia and Frank Dodd. The three often discussed their future, with Wilson and Frank both wanting to become pilots, and Amelia wanting to dance on Broadway. Years later Amelia asks Wilson to do the honorable thing and marry her, but fears what her father will do to him when he found out. Wilson is surprised about her request, as he always thought that she would never marry him, but he is determined to make her dream become a reality.

Meanwhile, Wilson remembers how he got a job at the local airfield thanks to Frank's dad. Frank quickly became a pilot, but Wilson did not have the money to get flight certified and as such became a mechanic and fixed planes. Regardless he was still happy in life and eventually asked Amelia to marry him, and she agreed. That evening Amelia told Lawrence, who strangely did not say anything at all, and left to do some work in the field. When Frank found out about the wedding, he privately told Wilson to cancel it saying that Amelia would never settle for a quiet life in Bastion Falls. Wilson ignored his request, confident he would soon have his pilots license and would be able to fly her to the Big City. Suddenly the bell from the hilltop church begins to ring in the Dreamscape, and once Wilson reaches it, he remembers how on the wedding day Amelia never showed up, and she was never seen again. Lawrence blamed her disappearance on Wilson, saying it never would have happened if he had not asked her to marry him.

It is at this point that Wilson's own memories end, but the Scarecrow Guide informs him that all Dreamscapes are connected, and he will be able to uncover the truth of Amelia's disappearance if he continues searching. He begins by going back to the barn and discovering Amelia's necklace. While there, he remembers a conversation he had with Amelia the day before the wedding, where she expressed concern for Frank after he called her and told her to cancel the wedding. As a result of this, she told Wilson she did not want him at the wedding in case he did something stupid. Wilson recalls a telephone conversation he had overheard Frank having one day at the airfield, and realizes that this conversation was the one Amelia was referring to. He remembers that Frank told her to meet him at their “special spot” so they could talk. This “special spot” is a lake where Amelia and Frank had their one and only date many years prior. When Wilson reaches the lake, he learns that Frank downed Amelia in a fit of anger when she told him she intended to follow through and marry Wilson, telling her that if he could not have her, no one could.

Having discovered the truth to Amelia's disappearance, Wilson enters Frank's Dreamscape so he can make him face his guilt. However, Frank is now an old man with dementia, and as such his Dreamscape is highly chaotic and distorted. In the middle of Frank's Dreamscape Wilson finds Amelia's necklace again, and Frank finally accepts his guilt. Back in the present Wilson dies moments later, content that he has now discovered the truth.

== Development ==
Dreamscape was mostly developed by George Lippert, who is the CEO of Speedbump Studios. Lippert acted as the game's sole programmer, and also provided the voice for all male characters. He also co-wrote the game's script alongside Jane Kalmes. Lippert designed the game around a 3D cabin model he made while learning to use the Unreal Engine in January 2011. Development began the same month, and was finished by April the same year. All voice acting was recording using iPhones, occasionally while in a closet. Carol Mertz, in association with Rampant Interactive, provided the voices of Amelia and the Scarecrow Guide. Lippert's eight-year-old son Zane, with some digital assistance, provided the voice of young Amelia. Isaias Garcia composed and performed the musical score.

Dreamscape was first announced on April 8, 2014 which coincided with the release of the reveal trailer. At the same time the game was sent to Apple for review in order to get it onto the iOS App Store. Shortly after Lippert discovered that, due a memory bug, the game would not run on the iPhone 3GS, iPod Touch or original iPad, and decided to pull the game from the review process. Lippert spent the next month working on fixing this issue, and bought an iPad in order to test the game on multiple devices. On May 30, 2011 Lippert announced that the bug had been fixed and that Dreamscape had been resent to Apple for review. A second trailer was released alongside this announcement. Dreamscape was released on June 9, 2011, and became the second game to run on iOS devices using Unreal Engine 3, the first been 2010's Infinity Blade.

== Reception ==
Dreamscape

Aggregate scores
Aggregator	Score
GameRankings	70.00%
Metacritic	62/100

Review scores
Publication	Score
Eurogamer	5/10
148Apps	3.5/5
Apple'N'Apps	3.5/5
AppSpy	4/5
Gamekult	6/10
Gamezebo	1/5
Pocket Gamer	5/10
Slide to Play	4/4
TouchArcade	3/5

Dreamscape received mixed reviews from critics. Aggregating review website GameRankings provides an average rating of 70% based on 8 reviews, whereas Metacritic provides an average rating of 62 out of 100 based on 9 reviews, meaning mixed or average reviews.

Dreamscape's plot generally received praise. Slide to Play's Chris Reed described it as "compelling", adding that it kept him "intrigued the whole way through". Gamekult's Thomas Méreur stated that it was well constructed and was one of the game's highlights. Apple'N'Apps Trevor Sheridan called the story "unique and interesting", saying that it kept him hooked until the end. Both Pocket Gamer's Chris Schilling and 148Apps Rob Rich noted that while the story was familiar, it was "skillfully told". By contrast Gamezebo's Jim Squires described the story as "B-movie embarrassing", and criticized the unrealistic dialog.

The game's sound design received praise, specifically the voice acting and music. Reed, Schilling, and Touch Arcade's Nissa Campbell all recommended that players use headphones while playing the game, and called the use of sound its strongest element. Reed also stated that the game's atmosphere would not be as good without its audio, and gave praise to the voice acting. Campbell called the sound-design "pitch perfect" and gave particular praise to the voice acting and music, called them "amazing". Sheridan said that the soundtrack "fits the mystery and creepy theme", and also noted the "quality" voice acting. Squires called the voice acting "decent" but criticized the audio effect used during all lines of dialog.

Reviewers criticized the gameplay, which was generally seen as very basic and uninspiring. Eurogamer's Kristan Reed criticized the decision not to let players pick up objects needed to progress the story until the story has advanced far enough, which he felt led to highly repetitive gameplay. Squires noted that the game lacked "any clear sense of direction" which caused him to have to use an online guide in order to solve the first puzzle in the game. He added that the gameplay was nothing more than walking, and described the whole experience as "nothing more than a glorified tech demo". Shilling wrote that the game was "an absolute chore to play" as a result of the backtracking, and added that the occasional action sequence were "flat-out awful". Both Campbell and Reed criticized the in-game map, which they felt failed to accurately represent the game world. Campbell described the gameplay as uninspiring, and also criticized the amount of backtracking needed to finish the game. Reed noted that the game lacked replay value.

The game's controls received a highly negative response from reviewers. Rich, Sheridan, Squires, Shilling and App Spy's Andrew Nesvadba all criticized the controls. Both Rich and Sheridan described it as unresponsive, with Rich further adding that it felt "sluggish." Campbell wrote that the on-screen controls were "too large and awkward to use comfortably", and also criticized the fact that the camera controls could not be inverted. Nesvadba stated that the control issues worked against the game in such a way that it "profoundly taints the experience". Shilling wrote that certain sections of the game became torturous to play as a result of the unresponsive controls.

Dreamscape's visuals received a more mixed response. Nesvadba described the visuals as "beautiful" as a result of Unreal Engine 3, adding that it made the game more absorbing. Reed wrote that the graphics were "gorgeous" and "incredible." Sheridan stated that the graphics helped immerse him in the overall experience, giving particular praise to the lighting effects, but that the overall visuals were not as impressive as Infinity Blade. Schilling praised the "gorgeous skyboxes", but criticized some occasional poor texture work. By contrast, Reed described the visuals as nothing more than serviceable, stating that Epic Citadel looked much better. Campbell noted that the textures looked "strangely low resolution", and recommended playing the game on an iPhone 4 in order to make the visuals look better. Both Squires and Rich criticized the inconsistent frame rate.
