= Type Z =

Z-type or Type Z may refer to:

- Z-Type, a video game
- Renault Z-Type engine
- Victorian Railways Z type carriage
- Z-type manifold arrangement, in plate heat exchanger design
- Z-type ferrite, a type of ceramic material
- Type Z, one of the UIC passenger coach types
- Type Z, a European copper tubing standard
