= Dungeons & Dragons: Daggerdale =

2011 video game

- North American box art
- Developer: Bedlam Games
- Publisher: Atari, Inc.
- Engine: Unreal Engine 3
- Platforms: Windows, Xbox 360, PlayStation 3
- Release: Windows, Xbox Live Arcade: WW: May 25, 2011; PlayStation Network: NA: May 22, 2012; EU: July 11, 2012
- Genre: Action role-playing
- Modes: Single-player, multiplayer

Dungeons & Dragons: Daggerdale is an action role-playing video game developed by Bedlam Games and published by Atari, Inc. The game includes both single and co-operative multiplayer modes and is set in the Forgotten Realms.

== Gameplay ==
Daggerdale features third-person real-time tactics combat, questing, character development, and exploration. Two modes, campaign and freeplay, are in the game. Single and multiplayer modes are also included, with split-screen multiplayer for up to four players. While some gameplay elements were borrowed from Baldur's Gate: Dark Alliance, the developers stated that this was taken from the linear part of the game and that the gameplay was inspired by Dungeons & Dragons: Heroes.

The game makes use of the four main D&D character classes: clerics, rogues, wizards and fighters, as well as the four main races, dwarves, elves, halflings and humans. Some customization of the characters is provided as a player earns experience in the game, and character progression advances as per a limited set of 4th Edition Dungeons and Dragons rules for both class and race. Further customization is achieved through loot and equipment drops. Character level advancement is currently limited to level 10.

== Synopsis ==
=== Characters ===
Four pre-generated characters are available for players to choose as an avatar: a human male fighter, a dwarf male cleric, a halfling male wizard and an elf female rogue. Players are initially offered limited options for modification of a character - such as choosing the character's name. Additional customization requires the character to gain experience and collect equipment during the game. Each character features abilities and bonuses related to its class and race.

The main antagonist of the game is a worshiper of the god Bane. This Wizard Mage is an agent of the Zhentarim and is known as Rezlus. He is extremely grotesque. He is hell-bent on taking over Daggerdale for his evil god and states it at the beginning of the game. He is amassing an army to take over the Dale. Lorin-Aria is the character in the game who summons the main characters. She was a Banite Priestess, loyal to Rezlus. Her sister, Nezra, is first revealed as a mystery, but at the very end is revealed to be a Zhent loyal to Cyric. Because the game takes place in the Dwarven Mines of Tethyamar, there are many Dwarves present. The Zhentarim are also known as the Black Network, a name which they are referred to when hiding their identity.

The Black Network has been divided into two sections: the Banites and the Cyrcists (those loyal to Bane and those loyal to Cyric). The Zhentarim, however, have become extremely weak following the Spellplague and the division of the Black Network weakened them further. Rezlus hopes to take over Daggerdale and restore the Zhentarim to their former glory. If Rezlus had succeeded, Zhentarim's control in the Dalelands would have been firm again, their empire would be feared, they would have a strong army and Cyric's influence would be crushed, making Bane the main deity again.

=== Setting ===
The game takes place in the Forgotten Realms year of 1420 DR in Daggerdale, which rests atop the underground ruins of the Dwarven Kingdom of Tethyamar. The Zhentarim have built the Tower of Void in these ruins. To take over the Dale, players will have to enter the mines, find the Tower of Void, kill Rezlus, and stop the Zhentarim operations. The tower extends high above Daggerdale even though its entrance is underground.

=== Plot ===
In the Mines of Tethyamar in Daggerdale, in the year 1420 DR, the Zhentarim have constructed the Tower of Void as an attempt to take over the Dale. Lorin-Aria, fearing the power of the Zhentarim, calls on four adventurers from different regions in the Dalelands. She calls a human fighter, dwarven cleric, elven rogue and a halfling wizard. She informs the player that the Zhentarim are building an army to conquer Daggerdale. Aria then vanishes before the heroes, telling them that because of her ties to the Zhentarim, she will not be able to aid them further. The heroes soon run into trouble, as they find goblins imprisoning a dwarven worker. The heroes save the worker who informs them that Goblins are raiding their camps all throughout the Mines of Tethyamar.

The heroes are attacked by an earth elemental, a creature that kills all of the goblins and tries to kill the four heroes. The heroes enter a portal and arrive in a rebuilt part of the Ruins of Tethyamar called Granstone. The dwarf Garbo Silvertongue arranges for the heroes to meet with the dwarves' Master Paxton, Union Leader Esar and Ayer. Eventually the heroes manage to gain Master Paxton's favor by helping the dwarves fight the goblins. While looking in Oxenmoor for the dwarves, the heroes find Master Paxton's satchel, containing Dryad Dust, in a goblin camp. The heroes find that the goblins have poisoned the dwarven water supplies with dryad dust. When the heroes return to Granstone, a whole goblin army attacks the Ruins of Tethyamar, however the heroes defeat the goblins. Ayer then has Master Paxton arrested and opens up the Grand Gates for the heroes to enter.

Following Ayer's advice, the heroes enter the Tower of Void through its storage area. There they find Garbo Silvertongue talking to Master Paxton. The heroes overhear Garbo state that he and the Goblins are loyal to Bane and the Zhentarim and that they plan to poison the rest of Granstone's water supplies. Garbo states that the Zhentarim will grant him the rule of the Mines of Tethyamar. When Garbo leaves, the heroes free Master Paxton who runs to Ayer to warn him about Garbo. To make sure the Goblins do not attack Tethyamar again, the heroes attack the Goblin Chieftain killing him, and scattering the Goblins of Tethyamar. The heroes then encounter Garbo and kill him.

The heroes try to enter the Tower of Void but are swiftly defeated by Zhent Black Hands who lock them in prison. The Zhentarim tieflings play gladiator games with the players. They are encountered by Rezlus who believes them to be Cyricists. Long after Rezlus leaves, the heroes escape. They kill their tiefling guards and venture upwards into the Tower of Void. The heroes again fight Zhent Black Hands who nearly kill them. The heroes, however, meet up with many dwarves, prisoners, and a mysterious cleric woman named Nezra. These allies help them beat the Zhent Black Hands.

The heroes then make it to the top of the Tower of Void. Rezlus kills the heroes' allies and nearly kills them too. The four heroes then get the upper hand for a short time, but are once again defeated when Rezlus calls on his red dragon, Incendius. As the remaining goblins chain the heroes, they manage to escape and kill Rezlus. The dying mage orders Incendius to raze Daggerdale, an order that the dragon complies with. The human fighter, however, jumps on the dragon's back as it destroys the dale and stabs it in the head, killing it. They both then plummet to the destroyed dale.

When the dragon crashes to the ground, the fighter is quickly teleported to the Tower of Void. He is not in the mines of Tethyamar, but rather the ruins that surround the part of the tower where it reaches the surface. The teleporter is revealed to be Lorin-Aria, who has also teleported the other three heroes. Lorin-Aria congratulates the heroes. Then her back is shanked with a sword and she is killed by Nezra. Nezra reveals herself to have survived Rezlus and to be Lorin-Aria's sister. Nezra tells the heroes that Lorin-Aria was once a Banite Priestess loyal to Rezlus. She tells the four heroes that rule of Daggerdale will go to Cyric's Zhentarim, revealing herself to be a Cyrcist Zhentarim Priestess. She tells the heroes that she has no desire to kill them, but they persist and the Zhent Black Hand army marches into Tethyamar to the Tower of Void and kills them.

== Development ==
Bedlam Games began development of Daggerdale in March 2010 and 60 developers were reportedly working on the game as of January 2011. By January 2011, Bedlam began operating as a subsidiary of bitHeads, Inc. and continues to operate as a brand-dependent division. bitHeads co-founder, Scott Simpson, has alluded to plans that the company intended to pursue a game model that would allow a gamer to play the same game on both an Xbox 360 and a portable device, such as an iPhone, thus providing a player 24-hour access to the game.

== Release ==
Dungeons & Dragons: Daggerdale was released on May 25, 2011 on Xbox Live Arcade and Microsoft Windows. Dungeons & Dragons: Daggerdale missed its original PlayStation Network release date of May 31, 2011, and did not appear until the following year on May 22. Daggerdale was the first D&D video game to be released on a console since 2004.

== Reception ==
Reception

Aggregate score
Aggregator	Score
Metacritic	PC: 49/100; X360: 46/100; PS3: 46/100

Review scores
Publication	Score
Eurogamer	7/10
GameSpot	4.5/10
GameTrailers	4.8/10
Joystiq	1.5/5

Dungeons & Dragons: Daggerdale received "generally unfavorable" reception according to Metacritic. Joystiq rated the game a 1.5 out of a 5 scale. They called it not just a bad game, but also a "terrible" use of Wizards of the Coast's license. GameSpy's Andrew Hayward also gave it a 1.5 "poor" rating out of 5, criticizing its lack of innovation, as well its voice-acting, character models and "dialogue-heavy" story. GameTrailers gave it a 4.8 out of 10 saying that Daggerdale is cheapened by dull quests, bland combat, dreary environments, and an overall unpolished feel. GameSpot gave it a 4.5/10, criticizing the distracting screen tearing, pop-in and bugs but enjoyed the core combat. Eurogamer gave it 7/10, calling it solid but also noting its lack of innovation. GameZone gave the game a 4.5 out of 10, criticizing its cliché storyline, uninspired side quests, muddled graphics, and the bland and repetitive combat. Jeb Haught of The Charleston Gazette and Pavel Barter of the Belfast Telegraph complained that the game was very buggy, with the former saying that D&D: Daggerdale would have been a fun game if it had received stringent testing.

David M. Ewalt of Forbes was critical that Daggerdale is a standard hack-and-slash dungeon crawl, full of repetition and cliche, with "dull" solo campaign, but was positive to its multiplayer and its price of $15 to download.

== Sequels ==
The game was planned to have two expansions, with the player being able to go up 10 levels higher in each game, representing the 4th Edition "tiers". At the very end of Daggerdale in the post-credits scene, a picture of a robot holding a sign saying Gamma-Terra was shown. At E3 2011, Atari unveiled Gamma World: Alpha Mutation.
