= James Pond in the Deathly Shallows =

2011 video game

James Pond and the Deathly Shallows
- Developer: HPN Associates
- Publisher: HPN Associates
- Platform: iOS
- Release: 30 June 2011
- Genre: Side-scrolling action-adventure game
- Mode: Single player

James Pond in the Deathly Shallows is a 2011 video game released for the iPhone, iPod and iPad iOS service, developed and published by HPN Associates. It is the fifth game in the series and the first James Pond title to be released for the franchise in eighteen years. The title is a pun based on Harry Potter and the Deathly Hallows.

== Reception ==
Reception to the game has been largely negative. James Stephanie Sterling of Destructoid scored Deathly Shallows "1 out of 10" saying: "It is clear that those behind the game know what a useless waste of time it is, and awkwardly glued the James Pond name to it [in] order to con fans". They placed it in 2nd place on their list of the worst games of 2011.
