= Great Big War Game =

2012 video game

- App icon on iTunes
- Developer: Rubicon Developments
- Publisher: Rubicon Developments (Note: PC port published by ValuSoft.)
- Platforms: Android, iOS, Windows
- Release: Android, iOS; 18 July 2012; Windows; 28 August 2012
- Genre: Turn-based strategy
- Modes: Single-player, multiplayer

Great Big War Game (commonly abbreviated to GBWG) is a modern military 3D turn-based strategy video game developed by British studio Rubicon Development. It has been released on iOS, Android and Microsoft Windows. The game is a sequel to Great Little War Game. The game features multiple environment types, and 50 levels in campaign mode and for the first time in the series cross platform online multiplayer.

== Gameplay ==
Similar in gameplay to Great Little War Game, players take control of an army. Generally, players must destroy the enemy's headquarters to win the game, through in campaign missions the objective of the mission varies. The player who goes second gets a coin advantage to counterbalance the player going first.

Players use troop units to shoot other units and enemy buildings. Most unit types are focused on damaging enemy units and buildings, while some types of units have different functions. For example, the engineer captures buildings not owned by the current player, fleet oilers and supply trucks restore unit ammo and fuel, and jeeps, ferries, and sky hooks can carry units. The player can create new units using coins, obtained by having oil derricks captured when a new day starts. Infantry units can be hired at barracks, land vehicles at factories, sea vehicles at ship yards, and air vehicles at airbases. Player units can be promoted after defeating enough enemies without dying, which will make them able to take more damage and also be able to do more damage in a single shot. Units can run out of ammo, and vehicles can run out of fuel as well, and units can be healed/repaired and fuel and ammo replenished by going on the spawn pad of a building owned by a player. Each kind of offensive unit is built to take on different types of units, for example bazooka units are more powerful against vehicle units than grunts due to being specialized in defeating vehicles, while commandos are more expensive than grunts but are much more effective against taking down infantry. Also, offensive units have a set range which dictates at which distance the unit can fire enemies, this changes depending on the current elevation of the unit.

In the campaign mode, battle points can be used to permanently upgrade kinds of units that will be used in the campaign. Battle points can be obtained by finding star shaped boxes in each mission, and some are automatically obtained by completing missions.

New to the game is Fog of War, which obscures the parts of the map that cannot be seen by the player's units or by captured radar installations with thick fog that makes it impossible to see. Also, buildings can now be damaged by units, damaged buildings will not be as effective as undamaged buildings, by recruiting damaged units or giving out less coins per day for example.

== Reception ==
Reception

Aggregate score
Aggregator	Score
Metacritic	86/100

Review scores
Publication	Score
IGN	9.5/10
RedEye	2/4
TouchArcade	5/5

Much like its predecessor GBWG has received mostly positive reviews. IGN gave it a score of 9.5 out of 10.0 and an Editors' Choice award, comparing the gameplay of the game to the Advance Wars franchise, and praising the game for its long campaign. Ryan Smith wrote in his review for RedEye that the game "packs in a lot of content", and also noted that the game "suffers from complicated gameplay and subpar visuals, and maybe it should be renamed 'Pretty Good War Game' instead.

The staff at Slide To Play said "there's very little that we didn't like about the game", but "zooming in and out of the battlefield isn't as smooth as we would like, but other than that, this game is as close to perfect as we could hope. It's polished, refined, and has so much to offer that strategy fans of all stripes will find something to love about it. Eric Ford from TouchArcade wrote that the game "continues where its prequel left off with the same great turn-based tactical action that we've grown to love", and that the "enhanced visual engine offers retina-quality graphics". Overall, he said "there's very little to complain about, and it's simply an amazing turn-based strategy game and a worthy sequel to the series.

The game was nominated for Best Strategy Game in 2013 by BAFTA.
