= Alien Zombie Megadeath =

2011 video game

- Developer(s): PomPom Games
- Platform(s): PlayStation 3, Windows
- Release: WW: 21 June 2011; EU: 6 July 2011
- Genre(s): Shooter

Alien Zombie Megadeath is a shooter video game developed by PomPom Games for Microsoft Windows and PlayStation 3. The player navigates platforms while shooting at attacking enemies and collecting gems.

== Gameplay ==
Each stage has a certain number of horizontal platforms where the player's character can run and jump around. The general concept of the game is navigating those platforms while dodging the enemies. The main weapon is the blaster, used to kill enemies. Once they are defeated, each of them will drop small gems. Picking them up, along with larger gems that appear on the screen, increases a point multiplier which increases the high score.

Progression in the game is connected to earning medals that are awarded for specific, progressively more difficult challenges within each stage. There are two types of stages: Alpha and Adventure. In Alpha stages, there is no set amount of time or enemies to spawn, putting the emphasis on survival. That isn't the case during Adventure stages, where enemies need to be baited for collecting their crystals upon death.

== Reception ==
Reception

Aggregate score
Aggregator	Score
Metacritic	77/100

Review scores
Publication	Score
Eurogamer	8/10
IGN	8.5/10

Alien Zombie Megadeath received mixed to positive reviews from critics upon release. On Metacritic, the PlayStation 3 version of the game holds a score of 77/100 based on 6 reviews.
