= Slam Bolt Scrappers =

2011 video game

- Developer: Fire Hose Games
- Publisher: Fire Hose Games
- Engine: Gamebryo
- Platforms: PlayStation Network, Microsoft Windows
- Release: PlayStation Network; March 15, 2011; Windows; March 14, 2013
- Genres: Puzzle, Action

Slam Bolt Scrappers is a puzzle video game produced by independent developer Fire Hose Games. Players control characters who fight enemies in a beat'em up style and build towers to destroy other players. The game blends aspects of several video game genres including puzzle, action, and strategy. Slam Bolt Scrappers was released on March 15, 2011, for digital download on PlayStation Network.

== Reception ==
Reception

Aggregate score
Aggregator	Score
Metacritic	(PC) 85/100 (PS3) 66/100

Review scores
Publication	Score
Eurogamer	6/10
Game Informer	7/10
GamePro	2.5/5
GameRevolution	B+
GameSpot	6.5/10
GamesRadar+	3.5/5
IGN	5.5/10
Joystiq	3/5
Play	73%
PlayStation: The Official Magazine	7/10

The PC version received "favorable" reviews, while the PlayStation 3 version received "average" reviews, according to the review aggregation website Metacritic.
