= Metal Dead =

2011 video game

- Developer: Walk Thru Walls Studios
- Designers: Liam O'Sullivan; Robert Wriedt
- Engine: Adventure Game Studio
- Platform: Windows
- Release: December 19, 2011
- Genre: Point-and-click adventure
- Mode: Single-player

Metal Dead is a point-and-click adventure game created by independent Australian developer Walk Thru Walls Studios and released online on December 19, 2011. It was built with the Adventure Game Studio engine.

Metal Dead was heavily influenced by adventure games released by LucasArts and Sierra Entertainment in the late 1980s and early 1990s. It also drew inspiration from zombie films and heavy metal bands.

== Plot ==
The game begins with protagonist Malcolm and his best friend Ronnie driving down zombie infested streets in a beat-up car. Upon learning that Ronnie is driving them directly into the heart of the undead infestation, Malcolm grabs the wheel and causes them to crash outside the MediGeniTech building, a place where nefarious medical experiments are said to take place. Ronnie dies a violent death in the wreck, leaving Malcolm to find his way into the building on his lonesome. Once inside the facility, Malcolm meets Doctor Fritz Von Fechenheim, a stereotypical German mad scientist who sends him on an errand to collect the head of a zombie.

When returning to the wrecked car, Malcolm finds that Ronnie has already become one of the undead. Using his wits, he manages to remove Ronnie's head without damaging the brain and brings it back to Doctor Fechenheim, who then performs an experimental surgical procedure. By installing a speaker and other various machinery inside the disembodied cranium, Fechenheim gives Ronnie the ability to communicate as if he were never dead. Before long, Ronnie is back to his normal self, sans body and perhaps a little more rotten than before.

As friends reunited, Malcolm and Ronnie vow to discover the cause and source of the zombie apocalypse, which seems to be converging on the MediGeniTech building. With an elevator keycard obtained from the Doctor, they begin their ascent, meeting a cast of weird characters along the way and uncovering the building's dark secrets.

== Development ==
The game was designed by Liam O'Sullivan and Robert Wriedt, with music composed by Josh Birch. Development began in mid-2010 and ended in late 2011.

== Reception ==
Reception

Aggregate score
Aggregator	Score
GameRankings	75%

Review scores
Publication	Score
Adventure Gamers	4/5
PC PowerPlay	7/10
Alternative Magazine Online	8.5/10
The Reticule	4/5

The game received generally positive reviews, with most focusing on the strength of the writing, humor, and characters. Adventure Gamers wrote that the "polished writing surpasses that of efforts from much larger studios" and that "jokes come quickly, hitting far more often than not". The game's puzzles were also praised, and Gnome's Lair said that while "generally easy, they are logical, well integrated and actually fun." Many reviewers commented on the surreal, surprising ending. JTM Games wrote "I don't want to say too much about the game's terrific climax, except, I didn't expect THAT."

Metal Dead came in at number 9 on IndieGames.com's list "The Top 10 Indie Adventure Games of 2012".
