= Feed Me Oil =

2011 video game

- Developer: Alexander Ilin
- Publisher: Chillingo
- Engine: Cocos2d
- Platforms: iOS; Android; Windows Phone; PlayStation Mobile
- Release: June 2, 2011: iOS; June 2, 2011; Windows Phone; April 30, 2012; Android; July 3, 2012; PlayStation Mobile; June 26, 2013
- Genre: Puzzle
- Mode: Single-player

Feed Me Oil is a physics-based puzzle game developed by Russian studio HolyWaterGames for iOS, Android, and Windows Phone devices. The game was released on the iTunes App Store in June 2011 and Google Play in July 2012, by publisher Chillingo Ltd. The Windows Phone version of the game was published by Electronic Arts and released on the Windows Phone Store in April 2012. The game was featured as the iPhone Game of the Week, as well as the number-one paid app in the United States and other countries.

== Gameplay ==
The objective in the game is to fill the creature's mouth with oil (hence the game name). As the player progresses through the game by completing levels, subsequent levels become more complex. The amount of oil varies between level to level, and occasionally there are multiple creatures to feed oil to. Additionally, there may also be a certain color or type of oil that the creature wants. Players will be provided objects to use in order to guide the oil into the creature's mouth. Some of these provided objects include: solid bars, fans, oil filters, and tornados. Each of these objects perform a different task; for example, the fan will "push" the oil in the direction that it is blowing. There are also special objects in some levels, such as buttons, which may activate another pathway or lift an obstacle in order to be able to complete the level. The less objects that the player uses to complete the level, the more points the player will be awarded. The amount of time it takes to complete the level is also a factor when calculating the score.

Additional level packs included with updates to the game introduced new special objects and mechanics, such as anti-gravity and oil-mixing.

== Development and release ==
Feed Me Oil was developed by independent game developer Alexander Ilin, and was published by Chillingo. Production began in August 2010, when Ilin was inspired to create a game with the core mechanic based around fluid after watching the trailer for The Unfinished Swan. According to Ilin, his primary goal when developing Feed Me Oil was "paying attention to every aspect of the design, from the physics to the graphics to the overall mechanics". He also attempted to create gameplay mechanics that would function on any mobile device, regardless of screen size. The game was developed using Cocos2d.

Feed Me Oil was first released for iOS devices on June 2, 2011. In its initial week of release, it became the top selling app in several countries, including the United States, England, and Australia. It was then released for the Windows Phone on April 30, 2012, Android devices on July 3, 2012, and PlayStation Mobile on June 26, 2013. Ilin hired five people to help with developing updates after the game's release, and eventually founded Holy Water Games with his new employees.

== Reception ==
Reception

Aggregate score
Aggregator	Score
Metacritic	86/100

Review scores
Publication	Score
Eurogamer	8/10
IGN	9/10
Pocket Gamer	7/10
TouchArcade	4/5

Feed Me Oil received positive reviewers from critics. The aggregate-review website Metacritic rated the iOS version 86/100, based on 17 reviews.
