= TNT Racers =

2011 video game

- Logo
- Developers: DTP Entertainment; Keen Games; Kaiko
- Publisher: dtp entertainment
- Platforms: Xbox 360, PlayStation Portable, PlayStation 3, Wii, Wii U
- Release: Xbox 360; February 9, 2011; PSP: NA: February 14, 2011; PAL: February 16, 2011; PlayStation 3: PAL: February 15, 2011; NA: January 3, 2012; Wii: EU: February 2, 2012; NA: April 5, 2012; Wii U: EU: September 5, 2013; NA: October 3, 2013
- Genre: Racing
- Modes: Single-player, multiplayer

TNT Racers is a racing video game for the Xbox 360, PlayStation Portable, PlayStation 3, Wii, and Wii U (the latter console version rebranded as TNT Racers: Nitro Machines Edition). The game was released on the consoles as downloadable games. The game was developed by Keen Games and the publisher for the title was DTP Entertainment.

== Gameplay ==
TNT Racers features top-down racing for up to four players in a cartoon-like environment.

TNT (short for "Tracks N Tricks") Racers is a top-down arcade-style racer. The game features 16 vehicles with various strengths and weaknesses. In races, the player can use powerups that are scattered around the 18 tracks to destroy opponents and hazards in their path. Players that have their vehicle destroyed or fall off the screen will resurrect as a ghost that can tamper with the remaining racers. The game also has 45 challenges for the player to complete. The game's soundtrack ranges from various jazz themes to cartoon chase scene-style music.

=== Development and marketing ===
The game also released two downloadable content packages, called TNT Racers Drift Challenge and TNT Racers Formula TNT. Drift Challenge features two new cars and four new tracks, as well as the "Drift Challenge". The same applies to Formula TNT, which also features two new cars and four tracks.

== Reception ==
Reception

Aggregate score
| Aggregator | Score | | | | |
| Aggregator | PS3 | PSP | Wii | Wii U | Xbox 360 |
|---|---|---|---|---|---|
| Metacritic | 70/100 | 71/100 | 61/100 | 62/100 | 64/100 |

Review scores
| Publication | Score | | | | |
| Publication | PS3 | PSP | Wii | Wii U | Xbox 360 |
|---|---|---|---|---|---|
| Eurogamer | N/A | N/A | N/A | N/A | 7/10 |
| GamePro | N/A | N/A | N/A | N/A | 4/5 |
| GamesMaster | N/A | N/A | N/A | 60% | 43% |
| GameSpot | 7/10 | 7/10 | N/A | N/A | 7/10 |
| NGamer | N/A | N/A | 40% | N/A | N/A |
| Nintendo Life | N/A | N/A | 7/10 | 7/10 | N/A |
| Official Nintendo Magazine | N/A | N/A | 72% | N/A | N/A |
| PlayStation Official Magazine – UK | 7/10 | N/A | N/A | N/A | N/A |
| Official Xbox Magazine (UK) | N/A | N/A | N/A | N/A | 7/10 |
| Official Xbox Magazine (US) | N/A | N/A | N/A | N/A | 5/10 |
| 411Mania | N/A | N/A | N/A | N/A | 7.5/10 |

The game received "mixed or average reviews" on all platforms according to the review aggregation website Metacritic. Official Xbox Magazine questioned the need of selecting a control scheme before every race, the camera, and the lack of balance between the challenges. NGamer gave the Wii version an unfavorable review, over a year before it was released in Europe and elsewhere.
