= Akane the Kunoichi =

2011 video game

- Developer: Haruneko
- Publisher: Haruneko
- Designer: Giovanni Simotti
- Composer: Kevin MacLeod
- Engine: XNA
- Platforms: Xbox 360, Windows Phone, iOS, Windows
- Release: May 28, 2011: Xbox 360; May 28, 2011; Windows Phone; March 26, 2012; iOS; June 14, 2012; Windows; May 4, 2014
- Genre: Platform
- Mode: Single-player

Akane the Kunoichi is a platform game developed by independent Italian studio Haruneko. It was released for the Xbox 360's Xbox Live Indie Games service in 2011 and was ported as a budget title for Microsoft Windows (Steam and Desura), Windows Phone 7, and iOS.

== Plot ==
The game's protagonist Akane is a kunoichi who secretly loves her feudal master Goro. When he is kidnapped, Akane goes off to rescue him from the evil Hiromi and her minions.

== Reception ==
Akane the Kunoichi was met with mostly favourable critical reception, including being a finalist at Dream Build Play 2012 in the Windows Phone category. Game Informer described the Xbox 360 version as a "fine" example of an "old-school platformer" for "one measly dollar". Daniel Douvris of AppAdvice commented on the iOS version of the game: "Akane the Kunoichi is a fun action platformer. Its platforming elements, as well as its artwork, are reminiscent of retro games of the past. Put simply, it is a breath of fresh air from the endless piles of junk that line the App Store these days." Hardcore Gaming 101 called Akane one of the best Xbox Live Indie Games.
