= Forget-Me-Not (video game) =

2011 video game

- Developer: Nyarlu Labs
- Designer: Brandon Williamson
- Platforms: iOS, Android
- Release: March 22, 2011
- Genres: Maze
- Mode: Single-player

Forget-Me-Not is a maze game written by Australian developer Brandon Williamson under the name Nyarlu Labs and released on March 22, 2011, for Android and iOS. The game was removed from the App Store once 32-bit support was dropped, but later returned as part of the gaming subscription service GameClub.

== Reception ==
Forget-Me-Not has a Metascore of 85% based on 13 critic reviews. In 2011, Metacritic also gave the game a ranking of the #71 Best IOS Game for the year.
