= Days of Thunder (2011 video game) =

2011 racing video game

- NASCAR Edition logo
- Developer: Piranha Games
- Publishers: Paramount Digital Entertainment, 505 Games (PS3 version bundled with film)
- Series: Days of Thunder
- Platforms: Arcades PlayStation 3, Xbox 360
- Release: PlayStation 3: NA: February 22, 2011; Xbox 360: NA: February 25, 2011
- Genre: Racing
- Modes: Single-player, multiplayer

Days of Thunder (known as Days of Thunder: NASCAR Edition on the PlayStation 3 and Days of Thunder: Arcade on the Xbox 360) is a stock car racing video game produced by Paramount Digital Entertainment and developed by Piranha Games for PlayStation 3 and Xbox 360. It was released in February 2011 and is a spin-off of the 1990 film Days of Thunder in which the player is a rookie driver coached by Rowdy Burns, the antagonist from the film. The game received very little critical feedback; those that did review the game had generally negative commentary. Reviewers felt that the cars handled unrealistically, but one reviewer noted that some issues could be fixed with a patch.

== Gameplay ==
Days of Thunder was created to commemorate the 20th anniversary of the film.

The PlayStation 3 version of the game includes 12 NASCAR sanctioned tracks, among them Daytona International Speedway and Talladega Superspeedway, and more than 12 select NASCAR Sprint Cup drivers, including Denny Hamlin, Ryan Newman and Tony Stewart. All versions feature the Days of Thunder characters Cole Trickle, Rowdy Burns, and Russ Wheeler. The Xbox 360 version does not feature NASCAR branding or drivers, but still features fictional drivers from the film.

Both versions feature a single player season and multiplayer support for up to twelve players. Days of Thunder has four different game modes: Quick Race, Time Trial, Career, with circuits of varying difficulty, and Derby Mode, where players are encouraged to deal as much damage as they can. Three basic vehicle types are available in the game: Accelerators are lighter cars with increased speed but are more susceptible to damage; Intimidators are heavier and more capable of handling damage, but have a lower top speed; and Regulators have a medium weight, medium top speed, and have average damage resistance.

Sponsorships with racing teams can be earned by playing through the game and completing challenges. When a sponsor is earned a new paint livery is unlocked for the player to customize their stock car with. Players can have up to five different saved cars, and each car can feature a different paint scheme and sponsorship. The sponsorship benefits are cosmetic only. Matthew Newman, Producer at Piranha Games stated that the game "is not a simulation, we chose to let the player unlock all the sponsors and race for whichever sponsor they choose in single player and multi player".

== Development ==
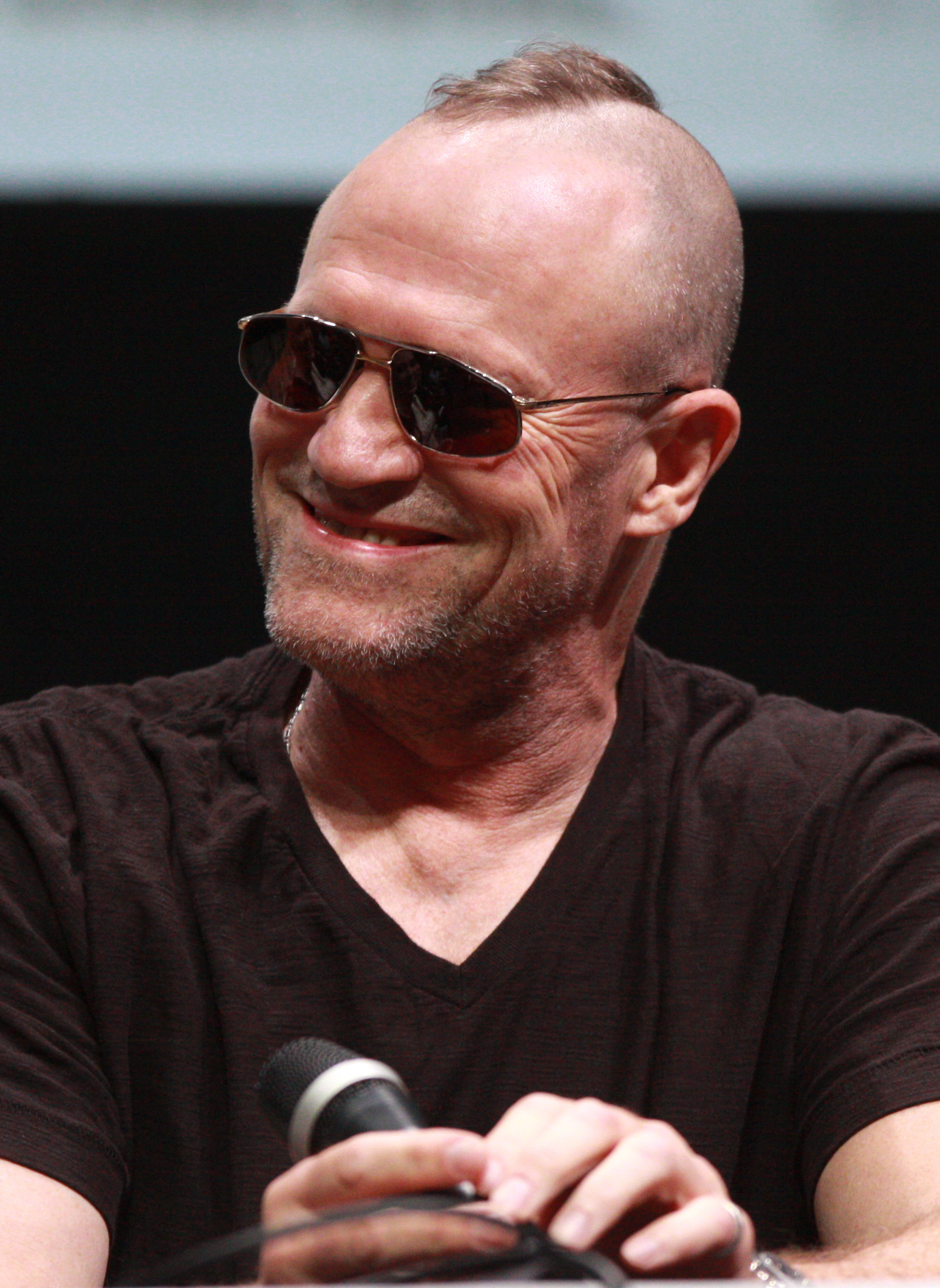
Michael Rooker, who played the character Rowdy Burns in the film, returns to voice the player character's crew chief.

A video game adaptation of the movie from 1990 was announced in 2010, firstly as NASCAR Edition for PlayStation 3 in June and later an Arcade version for Xbox 360 in October. In an interview with producer Jeff Dickson, the history behind the game was revealed. The game was created to celebrate the 20th anniversary of the Days of Thunder film. The NASCAR Edition is intended to be a union of NASCAR and the film, and features drivers from the movie as well as NASCAR drivers from the past and present (Hendrick Motorsports was actively involved in the film during 1989 and 1990 filmings, providing cars and technical support; also the film's storyline was based on a former Hendrick driver). Both versions of the game were designed with arcade-based gameplay. During development trailers fictional drivers had liveries coinciding with Paramount Pictures and Days of Thunder, as well as other Paramount Pictures films such as Top Gun, Transformers and Iron Man 2. At release only the Days of Thunder, Paramount Pictures, and other fictional racing liveries/sponsors remained. Michael Rooker returned to voice the character Rowdy Burns in the game.

When asked why the game would not be a simulation, Dickson replied: "Well, we wanted to stay away from that because the games that are out there that do that do it well". Developer Piranha Games wanted to ensure that players spent most of their time on the track, so aside from visual modifications, the ability to customize cars is limited, as Dickson said: "We don't want you to spend lots of time outside the game, we want you on the race track". The AI drivers in the game were designed to adapt to the player's typical racing style in which Dickson remarked: "If you're kind of an aggressive driver, they're gonna drive aggressive against you". A retail version of the PlayStation 3 version was bundled with the Blu-ray of the namesake movie, released on June 7, 2011. Mac OS X and Microsoft Windows versions were planned, but eventually cancelled.

== Reception ==
Reception

Aggregate score
Aggregator	Score
GameRankings	60% (PS3); 25% (X360)

Review scores
Publication	Score
Official Xbox Magazine (UK)	2/10 (UK)
Official Xbox Magazine (US)	(X360) 3/10
PSNStores	(PS3) 3/5

Days of Thunder received very little critical reception, with only one review published for the PlayStation 3 NASCAR Edition and very few published for the Xbox 360 Arcade version. Of the reviews published critics gave generally negative reviews. The PlayStation 3 version single GameRankings score comes from the reviewer from PSNStores, who gave the game a 3/5. The critic gave high marks for the PlayStation 3 version's inclusion of real-world NASCAR drivers, but was disappointed in the lack of customization. Two scores were reported at GameRankings for the Xbox 360 version, from the US and UK editions of Official Xbox Magazine. The scored the game a 3/10 and 2/10, respectively.

Scott Ellison of Saving Content panned the PlayStation 3 version of the game. He stated that "simply put, do not buy this game". Steve Melton of XBLA Fans agreed. He felt that with a title update the game could improve, but that it felt "like it was a contract job". The vehicle physics and handling were particular points of negative commentary. Ellison said that "the cars feel as if they don't have any weight to them". Melton concurred and added that the handling was overly sensitive: "Sneeze and the car'll be in the wall". Melton did concede that the steering could be adjusted in the game's options, but that the default configuration would dissuade most players from even looking there. In the May 2011 issue of Official Xbox Magazine the game also received extremely poor reception. The reviewer said "do yourself a favor: stay as far away from this wreck as possible".
