= Sweatshop (video game) =

2011 video game

- Developers: Littleloud; Channel Four Television
- Publisher: Channel Four Television
- Directors: Darren Garrett; Simon Parkin
- Designer: Simon Parkin
- Artist: Gary J. Lucken
- Platforms: Browser, iOS
- Release: Browser; July 18, 2011; iOS; November 2012 (Note: Under the name Sweatshop HD.)
- Genres: Simulation, educational, tower defence
- Mode: Single-player

Sweatshop is a 2011 educational simulation game with tower defence elements. Developed by Littleloud in partnership with and published by Channel Four Television, it was first released for browsers on July 18, 2011. An iOS port titled Sweatshop HD was released in November 2012, but it was removed in February 2013 due to concerns with the game's content.

== Gameplay ==
Throughout thirty levels, the player manages three different clothes factories. Assuming the role of a manager, the player must create a production line and control the number of workers in the factory.

== Development and release ==
Commissioned by Channel Four Television, Sweatshop was developed by British studio Littleloud, a company based in Brighton. They have previously partnered for projects including Bow Street Runner and The Curfew. The game was fact-checked by Labour Behind the Label. In 2011, the game was released for browsers, and in November 2012, the game was released for iOS.

=== Removal from App Store ===
Sweatshop HD was removed from the App Store in February 2013. Apple shared that it was "uncomfortable selling a game" that featured a sweatshop. However, Littleloud stated that the game was meant be a "sympathetic examination" for sweatshop workers.

== Reception ==
Reception

Review score
Publication	Score
Pocket Gamer	4/5

Matt Wales and James Gilmour of Pocket Gamer praised Sweatshop's writing. Rock Paper Shotgun's Alec Meer felt the balance between employee treatment and meeting the quota.
