= Infinity Field =

2011 video game

- App icon for iPad version
- Developer: ForzeField Studios
- Publisher: Chillingo
- Programmer: Manuel Martinez-Almeida
- Artist: Manuel Martinez-Almeida
- Composer: Chris Chudley
- Platform: iOS
- Release: iPad; 27 January 2011; iPhone; 25 August 2011
- Genre: Shooter
- Modes: Single-player, multiplayer

Infinity Field is a 2011 shooter game developed by the Spanish studio ForzeField Studios and published by Chillingo. After creating a high definition port for his first game, Abstract War 2.0, Manuel Martinez-Almeida was inspired to develop Infinity Field while in high school. The game was released for iOS on 27 January 2011, and it was received positively.

== Development and release ==
In Infinity Field, the player must shoot incoming enemies.

Infinity Field was developed by Manuel Martinez-Almeida, a self-taught game developer from Valladolid. After getting an iPhone from his father in 2009, Martinez-Almeida released his first game for iOS, Abstract War 2.0, in February 2010.

Martinez-Almeida developed Infinity Field while he was a 16-year-old student in high school. The inspiration to start development came from wanting to create a "much more ambitious shooter" after making a high definition port for Abstract War 2.0. The neon graphics of the Geometry Wars series served as the main inspiration for the game's visuals.

After establishing ForzeField Studios, he contacted Chillingo, whose co-general manager, Chris Byatte, approved Infinity Field for publishing. Martinez-Almeida worked alongside Chillingo's production team to polish the game before releasing it for the iPad on 27 January 2011 under the name Infinity Field HD. The game was released for the iPhone in August 2011.

== Reception ==
Reception

Aggregate score
Aggregator	Score
Metacritic	86/100

Review scores
Publication	Score
Edge	8/10 (iPhone and iPad)
Eurogamer	9/10 (iPad)
GamePro	85/100 (iPad)
IGN	8.5/10 (iPhone); 8/10 (iPad)
Jeuxvideo.com	16/20 (iPad)
Pocket Gamer	4/5 (iPad)
TouchArcade	3.5/5 (iPhone); 3.5/5 (iPad)
Belfast Telegraph	88% (iPhone)
Multiplayer.it	8.3/10 (iPhone)
Slide to Play	Must Have (iPad)

The game has a "generally favorable" Metacritic score based on 11 critics.

The game was well received.
