= Wooords =

2011 video game

- App icon
- Developer(s): Stray Robot Games
- Publisher(s): Stray Robot Games
- Platform(s): Android, iOS
- Release: July 21, 2011
- Genre(s): Word game
- Mode(s): Single-player

Wooords is a 2011 word game developed and published by the New Zealand studio Stray Robot Games. The game released for Android and iOS on July 21, 2011, and was met with a positive reception.

== Reception ==
Reception

Aggregate score
Aggregator	Score
Metacritic	90/100

Review score
Publication	Score
TouchArcade	5/5

On Metacritic, the game received "universal acclaim" based on four critics.

Multiple critics praised the game.
