= Ugly Americans: Apocalypsegeddon =

2011 video game

- Left to right: Grimes, Callie, Mark, and Leonard
- Developer: Backbone Entertainment
- Publishers: New 38th Floor Productions (PSN); 345 Games and Comedy Central (XBLA)
- Platforms: PlayStation 3, Xbox 360
- Release: August 30, 2011: PSN; August 31, 2011: XBLA
- Genre: Multidirectional shooter

Ugly Americans: Apocalypsegeddon is a twin-stick multidirectional shooter based on the Comedy Central television show Ugly Americans. The game was released for PlayStation 3 on August 30, 2011 and for Xbox 360 on August 31, 2011. It was developed by Backbone Entertainment and published by New 38th Floor Productions for the PlayStation 3 and by 345 Games and Comedy Central for the Xbox.

== Gameplay ==
Ugly Americans: Apocalypsegeddon is set in the same world as the television show it is based on, an alternate version of New York City which is inhabited by humans as well as demons, zombies, bird-people and other fictional creatures. Players assume the role of one of four of the main characters from the show, the wizard Leonard, the police officer Grimes, the demon Callie, or Mark, as they fight through the city of New York in side-scrolling combat controlled primarily by the left and right thumb sticks. Ugly Americans: Apocalypsegeddon supports both co-op play and an online multiplayer mode.

== Reception ==
Reception

Aggregate score
Aggregator	Score	
Aggregator	PS3	Xbox 360
Metacritic	44/100	45/100

Review scores
Publication	Score	
Publication	PS3	Xbox 360
Eurogamer	N/A	2/10
GamePro	N/A	3.5/5
GamesMaster	N/A	65%
GameZone	3/10	N/A
Official Xbox Magazine (US)	N/A	4/10
TeamXbox	N/A	2.1/10

Ugly Americans: Apocalypsegeddon received "generally unfavorable reviews" on both platforms according to the review aggregation website Metacritic. Critics found the game juvenile and repetitive, with characters and enemies repeating the same phrases to the point of annoyance. The game's customization options, which included upgrades to the playable characters and thirty different choices in weapon ammunition, were viewed as shallow.
