= Gatling Gears =

2011 video game

- Developer: Vanguard Games
- Publishers: Electronic Arts; Vanguard Games (PC)
- Platforms: Microsoft Windows, Xbox 360, PlayStation 3
- Release: Xbox 360: WW: May 11, 2011; PlayStation 3: WW: June 28, 2011; Microsoft Windows: WW: August 30, 2011
- Genre: Multi-directional shooter

Gatling Gears is a shooter video game developed by Vanguard Games and published by Electronic Arts. In the game, players control dieselpunk mechs from an isometric perspective to destroy waves of enemies. Gatling Gears was released on Xbox Live Arcade on May 11, 2011, June 28, 2011 for PlayStation Network and on August 30, 2011 for Windows.

Gatling Gears was made by the same team that created the turn-based strategy game Greed Corp and is set in the same world. Some iconic elements from Greed Corp are present in Gatling Gears, such as collapsing land and walker mechs.

== Reception ==
GameZone gave the game an 8/10, stating "It can be a repetitive process because each level requires you to blow up everything in sight, but the combination of challenge and reward makes the repetition a minute issue. If you’re in dire need of a solid twin-stick shooter fix, give Gatling Gears a go."
