= Robo Surf =

2011 video game

- Developer(s): Pieces Interactive
- Platform(s): iOS, Android
- Release: June 1, 2011
- Genre(s): Endless runner
- Mode(s): Single-player

Robo Surf is a 2011 endless runner game developed by Swedish indie studio Pieces Interactive. The game was released on June 1, 2011, for iOS and Android.

== Gameplay and release ==
In Robo Surf, the player controls the height of the waves. Controlling a robot, the player must collect oil barrels to fill up a speed meter while avoiding gulls. The player continues until they hit an obstacle or crash into the ocean. The game was released for iOS and Android on June 1, 2011.

== Reception ==
Reception

Aggregate score
Aggregator	Score
Metacritic	85/100

Review scores
Publication	Score
Pocket Gamer	4/5
TouchArcade	4/5
Modojo	5/5
Multiplayer.it	7.3/10

The game has a "generally favorable" rating on Metacritic based on four critics.

Modojo said "Most importantly, the game's a ton of fun and shockingly addictive. It literally came out of nowhere. Kudos to Pieces Interactive for releasing such a well-designed and cool App guaranteed to consume hours of our lives." PocketGamerUK wrote " Solid, simple, and effective controls are the basis for an entertaining one-touch experience. " TouchArcade said "Robo Surf is lighthearted and fun, with enough hooks to turn it from a momentary distraction to one of my new favorites. " Multiplayer.it said "The gameplay of Robo Surf is simple and intuitive, but unfortunately not so addictive, while the lack of variety and unlockable contents might discourage the player. Anyway, it's still a fun game and the cameos from Iji and Blueberry Garden are two nice touches." AppAdvice reported "It has a 4.5-star rating with a total of 226 ratings."
