= Bug Heroes =

2011 video game

- App icon
- Developer(s): Foursaken Media
- Publisher(s): Foursaken Media
- Platform(s): Android, iOS
- Release: January 6, 2011
- Genre(s): Shooter
- Mode(s): Single-player

Bug Heroes is a 2011 shooter game developed and published by the American studio Foursaken Media. After releasing for Android and iOS on January 6, 2011, a spinoff entitled Bug Heroes Quest was released on August 2, 2011, and a sequel called Bug Heroes 2 was released on February 19, 2014.

== Reception ==
Reception

Aggregate score
Aggregator	Score
Metacritic	89/100

Review scores
Publication	Score
Gamezebo	80/100
Pocket Gamer	4/5
TouchArcade	4.5/5

On Metacritic, Bug Heroes has a "generally favorable" rating based on 11 critics. The game was well received.

=== Sequels ===
Bug Heroes Quest rated 87/100 based on four reviews, and Bug Heroes 2 rated 90/100 based on eight reviews.
