= Ant Raid =

2011 video game

- App icon
- Developer: Prank
- Platforms: iOS, Android
- Release: July 6, 2011
- Genre: Real-time strategy
- Mode: Single-player

Ant Raid is a 2011 real-time strategy game developed by the Finnish indie studio Prank. It was released for iOS on July 6, 2011, and on Android in 2012. The game was well received.

== Gameplay ==
In Ant Raid, the player must send ants to defend against enemies such as snails and bees.

Ant Raid has 104 levels: 60 story mode levels, 40 challenge mode levels, and four endless mode levels. The player must defend a base from enemies such as snails and giant bees by strategically managing squads of ants. Defeated enemies drop colored energy that provides temporary abilities: blue makes ants invulnerable, red makes ants faster, and combining both applies both effects at the same time. Green energy activates the "divine finger" effect, allowing the player to temporarily kill enemies directly by tapping the screen.

== Reception ==
Reception

Aggregate score
Aggregator	Score
Metacritic	90/100

Review scores
Publication	Score
Gamezebo	4.5/5
Pocket Gamer	3.5/5
TouchArcade	4/5
148Apps	4.5/5
Slide to Play	4/4

On Metacritic, the game has received "universal acclaim", based on eight critics.

Slide to Play praised Ant Raid's graphics, describing the game as having "terrific presentation, complete with detailed insects and beautifully rendered landscapes", and expressed that the game has "plenty of content and challenge" and called the 'divine finger' mechanic "absurdly fun".

Gamezebo praised the game's varied gameplay and "personality", stating that "the whole game is as beautiful and colorful as the opening, with lush, detailed environments and quirky, fun characters throughout", but criticized the inability to zoom out to see more of the map at once.

148Apps described the game as "more approachable" than a hardcore RTS game, praising the game as a casual take on the RTS genre, expressing that "what seems cute and mindless is actually incredibly fun because it encourages one to think and use a little foresight".

TouchArcade praised the game's strategic gameplay, and expressed that while later levels get repetitive, the game's difficulty curve kept them interested.
