= 2011 in esports =

This article is a list of major esports events and tournaments in 2011.

Date	Game	Event	Location	Winner/s
January 23	multiples games	IEM Season V - European Championships		
January 29	StarCraft II	Global StarCraft II League January 2011		
January 29	StarCraft II	Bacchus OSL 2010		
February 19	StarCraft II	PDPop MSL 2010		
March 5		IEM Season V - World Championships		
March 19	StarCraft II	GSL March 2011		
April 3	multiple games	MLG Dallas 2011		
April 9	StarCraft II	GSL World Championship Seoul 2011		
April 23	Counter-Strike; Counter-Strike: Source; StarCraft II	Copenhagen Games 2011		
May 14	StarCraft II	GSL May 2011		
June 3-5	Call of Duty: Black Ops; Halo: Reach; StarCraft II	MLG Columbus 2011	Columbus Convention Center, Columbus, Ohio	
June 5	numerous games	EPS Germany: Summer Season 2011 Finals		
June 11	StarCraft II	ABC Mart MSL 2011		
June 11	StarCraft II	GSL Super Tournament		
June 18	StarCraft II	GSL Super Tournament		
June 21		DreamHack Summer 2011		
June 26	Defense of the Ancients; WarCraft III; StarCraft II	G-League 2011 Season 1		
July 10	StarCraft II	North American Star League Season 1		
July 29–31	fighting games	Evolution 2011	Rio All Suite Hotel and Casino; Las Vegas, Nevada, US	
July 30		GSL July 2011		
July 29-31		MLG Anaheim 2011	Anaheim Convention Center, Anaheim, California	
August 14		IGN Pro League Season 2		
August 20	Counter-Strike	WEG e-Stars 2011		
August 21	Dota 2	The International 2011		
August 21	League of Legends; StarCraft II	IEM Season VI - Cologne		
August 26-8		MLG Raleigh 2011	Raleigh Convention Center, Raleigh, North Carolina	
September 3	Call of Duty: Modern Warfare 3	Call of Duty XP		
September 10	StarCraft II	GSL August 2011		
September 17	StarCraft: Brood War	Jin Air OSL 2011		
October 5	Counter-Strike; League of Legends; StarCraft II	IEM Season VI - Guangzhou		
October 9	numerous games	WCG 2011 Samsung Euro Championship		
October 9	League of Legends; StarCraft II	IGN Pro League Season 3		
October 9	Defense of the Ancients; WarCraft III; StarCraft II	G-League 2011 Season 2		
October 14-16		MLG Orlando 2011	Gaylord Palms Resort & Convention Center, Orlando, Florida	
October 16	League of Legends; StarCraft II	IEM Season VI - New York	Jacob K. Javits Convention Center, New York City, New York	
October 22	StarCraft II	GSL October 2011		
October 22	StarCraft II; World of WarCraft	BlizzCon 2011		
October 25	multiple games	Electronic Sports World Cup 2011		
November 19	League of Legends	Tencent Games Carnival 2011		
November 18-20		MLG Providence 2011	Rhode Island Convention Center, Providence, Rhode Island	
November 27		DreamHack Winter 2011		
December 4	StarCraft II	NASL Season 2		
December 4	multiple games	EPS Germany: Winter Season 2011 Finals		
December 3	Starcraft II	GSL November 2011		
December 11, 2011	multiple games	World Cyber Games 2011	Busan, South Korea	
December 17	GSL Blizzard Cup 2011			
