= Async Corp. =

2011 video game

- App icon
- Developer: Powerhead Games
- Publisher: Powerhead Games
- Director: Jason Schreiber
- Producers: Jason Schreiber; Jason Teirstein
- Designer: Matt LoPresti
- Programmers: Randall Li; Ed Pereira
- Artist: Chris Makris
- Composer: Fearofdark
- Engine: UIKit
- Platform: iOS
- Release: June 28, 2011
- Genre: Puzzle
- Mode: Single-player

Async Corp. is a 2011 puzzle game developed and published by the American indie studio Powerhead Games. In it, the player must swap one square from two four-by-six boards to match a set of at least three other squares that create a packet. While listening to "Star Guitar" by The Chemical Brothers, designer Matt LoPresti was inspired to play its prototype, previously meant for DSiWare, in landscape mode. The corporate theme, inspired by the modernity of the Wipeout series, was contrasted by bright visuals to add personality.

Although the development team was laid off before launch, Async Corp. was released for iOS on June 28, 2011, and was praised for its gameplay, graphics, music, and corporate atmosphere but criticized for its lack of content. At the 2012 Independent Games Festival, it was nominated for an audience award and Best Mobile Game.

== Gameplay ==
In Async Corp., the player must swap squares between boards to form bigger ones that clear space when tapped.

Async Corp. is a puzzle game played from a top-down perspective. In control of two boards composed of 24 squares each, the player must take existing squares to make larger squares at least two-by-two in size. The player accomplishes this by swapping a square from each board, with a goal of creating larger squares (termed "packets") out of four matching squares; this can only be done if the squares complete a set of other squares of the same color. Once the player finishes swapping, the four smaller squares merge into a packet. The player may continue to swap squares to increase a packet's size; assembling a packet of 24 squares will create an Async. Tapping on a packet will make it disappear, rewarding the player with points; two packets created at the same time are called "syncs", which award bonus points. The round will end if the player's quota bar in the center of the screen overflows. At the end of each game, the player's productivity, or amount of points, will be graded. The player will earn a promotion and a new theme after gaining enough experience points.

Async Corp. has four modes: Async, Freeplay, Quota, and Zoning. Async mode orders the player to create three different full packets in order to advance to the next level. Freeplay mode allows unlimited play. In Quota mode, the player must create packets to prevent a rising meter from reaching the top of the screen. Conversely, Zoning mode requires the player to create packets to fill a falling meter; the player advances to the next level when the meter reaches the top and downgrades when the meter hits the bottom, and the speed increases as the mode progresses.

== Development and release ==
Async Corp. was developed by the twelve-person and New York City-based indie studio Powerhead Games, who had previously produced Glow Artisan for DSiWare. Over a period of four months, Async Corp. was developed with UIKit, and its visuals were made with Corel Image and Photoshop. The prototype, built by designer Matt LoPresti and programmer Ed Pereira, was made a year prior to release and was designed for DSiWare, where gameplay would be split between screens.

According to LoPresti, the concept for gameplay was conceived when listening to "Star Guitar" by The Chemical Brothers after hearing it in Lumines II. The song caused him to text a message to his wife flawlessly while his iPhone was in landscape mode, inspiring him to play the prototype similarly.

Its corporate theme took inspiration from the "modern, commercial style" of the Wipeout game series. LoPresti initially wanted each gameplay mode to resemble a product, while artist Chris Makris wanted players to cooperate to reach a goal; ultimately, the developers decided to cast the player as an employee working for a fictitious company. Its "cheery and sugary" atmosphere was meant to motivate players, as LoPresti remarked that "a happy worker is a productive worker." The team designed bright visuals to contrast the "cold and cynical" nature imposed by the corporate theme. According to creative director and CEO Jason Schreiber, the squares were given faces, designed by Makris, to add personality.

The development team was laid off on June 17, 2011, before Async Corp. was submitted to the App Store. It was released for iOS on June 28, 2011.

== Reception ==
Reception

Aggregate score
Aggregator	Score
Metacritic	85/100

Review scores
Publication	Score
The A.V. Club	B
Gamezebo	80/100
Pocket Gamer	4.5/5
TouchArcade	4.5/5
AppSpy	Good
148Apps	4.5/5

On Metacritic, Async Corp. received a "generally favorable" rating based on six critics. It was nominated at the 2012 Independent Games Festival for Best Mobile Game and an audience award.

The gameplay of Async Corp. was commended. Some reviewers agreed it was addictive and compelling. Kotaku compared it to Tetris and workplace comedy, justifying its portrayal of manual labor and praising how the modes gave variety. Although The A.V. Club stated that none of the gameplay modes were stressful, Dave Flodine of AppSpy felt it came up with its own original concept by "creating a unique world around it". Additionally, Rich Stanton of Eurogamer commented how the modes varied on the main gameplay mechanic. Gamezebo's Mike Thompson praised that it "never feels boring" and that the pace "never feels slow". Although describing it as "charmingly devised" and worth buying, Mike Schramm of Engadget criticized the tutorial.

Additionally, critics unanimously praised the minimalist graphics. Most agreed they were simple and colorful, while 148Apps's Rob Rich thought they complemented its style and concept. Noticing details, Chris Schilling of Pocket Gamer praised the packets' "cute" smiles, highlighting how they occasionally sneezed, while Engadget's JC Fletcher appreciated the packets' "charming" personality.

Reviewers praised the music featured in Async Corp.. Some critics felt the music was cheerful and catchy, while The A.V. Club described it as "badass". However, Flodine stated that the song might get repetitive for some players. Additionally, most lauded Async Corp.'s office-esque atmosphere; some compared it to a job or, more specifically, a postal delivery worker. Other critics noted its use of emails. Thompson likened the introduction videos to "corporate training segments".

The lack of content in Async Corp. was criticized. Reviewers noticed the absence of multitasking, with some saying that it would have more content if the developers were given more time. Writing for TouchArcade, Nissa Campbell noted that the only reward the player gets after a promotion is a new skin, stating that the player has no goals to work towards. Thompson felt that players could share their scores with each other if it implemented an online service, such as Game Center, while Kotaku stated that the player should be able to skip to harder levels sooner.
