= Cordy (video game) =

2011 video game

- App icon
- Developer: SilverTree Media
- Publisher: SilverTree Media
- Platforms: Android, iOS
- Release: 2011
- Genre: Platformer
- Mode: Single-player

Cordy is a 2011 platformer game developed and published by the American studio SilverTree Media. It was released for Android and iOS.

After SilverTree was acquired by GSN Games in late March 2013, the app disappeared from the App Store, then Google Play. It remains visible on the Amazon App Store and Microsoft Store.

The game garnered a mostly positive reception. Two sequels, Cordy Sky and Cordy 2, were released.

== Plot ==
A robot named Cordy explores the world to find out the cause behind a power outage.

== Gameplay ==
The gameplay consists of solving 27 puzzle-like levels with the objective being to run the electricity through the level, pushing blocks and barrel-like objects, and also using Cordy's plug to transfer the energy from one place to the other, usually with the ending of the level requiring the electricity in order to open or to work.

== Reception ==
Reception

Aggregate score
Aggregator	Score
Metacritic	82/100

Review scores
Publication	Score
TouchArcade	3.5/5
VideoGamer.com	90/100

On Metacritic, Cordy has a "generally favorable" rating of 82% based on seven critic reviews.

Multiple critics wrote favorably of the game.

== Sequels ==
=== Cordy Sky ===
Multiple critics gave favorable reviews.

=== Cordy 2 ===
On Metacritic, Cordy 2 has a "generally favorable" score of 84% based on nine reviews.

Reviewers wrote positive reviews.
