= Epic Citadel =

2010 tech demo

- Icon (above); Screenshot (below)
- Developer: Epic Games
- Release: September 1, 2010
- Stable release: 1.02 / September 10, 2010; 15 years ago
- Operating system: iOS 3.1.1 or later, Android, Flash, HTML5
- Size: 82.2 MB
- Available in: English
- Website: www.unrealengine.com/showcase/epic-citadel

Epic Citadel is a tech demo developed by Epic Games to demonstrate the Unreal Engine 3 running on Apple's iOS, within Adobe Flash Player Stage3D and using HTML5 WebGL technologies. It was also released for Android on January 29, 2013.

The application allows players to explore a medieval landscape without being able to interact with it otherwise. The application further has a built in benchmark mode and a "guided tour" mode. Nonetheless, this demonstration garnered significant attention as it showcases a free SDK called Epic's Unreal Development Kit (UDK).

The game uses dual zones with touchscreen control that are mapped as virtual joysticks. One controls the camera angle while the other controls the motion of the camera. The tech demo allows players to navigate through a fictional castle realm with various areas such as a circus bazaar, a river and a cathedral. The artwork of this demo was created by Shane Caudle and the program itself was created in eight weeks by a small team of programmers at Epic Games using the UDK.

== History ==
Epic Citadel was a precursor to the video game Infinity Blade for iOS, which was released on December 9, 2010.

On March 7, 2012, Epic released Epic Citadel for Flash, to demonstrate Unreal Engine 3 running within Adobe Flash Player in a web browser environment. It was the first gaming 3D engine to be ported to run within Flash Player, using the CrossBridge cross-compiler (also known as Alchemy).

On January 29, 2013, the app was launched for Google Android (version 2.3+), with exclusive benchmarking features, and was downloadable from the Google Play store. The iOS version was updated to version 1.1, adding support for the iPhone 5/iPod Touch (fifth generation) as well as optimized graphics for the iPad with Retina display.

Using additional technologies such as the C/C++ to JavaScript cross-compiler Emscripten, the application was ported to HTML5 supporting run time environments such as the Firefox web browser.

Following the 1.7 update version in 2015, development for the tech demo came to an end, and as of 2023 is unavailable in both App Store and Google Play Store marketplaces. However, this application is still obtainable via the Amazon store.
