= Great Little War Game =

2011 video game

- Developer(s): Rubicon Developments
- Publisher(s): Viacom Games
- Platform(s): iOS, Microsoft Windows, Android Google Chrome BlackBerry
- Release: iOS: NA: March 26, 2011; Microsoft Windows: NA: TBA; PlayStation Vita: NA: Canceled; Android, Google Chrome: NA: unknown
- Genre(s): Turn-based strategy

Great Little War Game (GLWG for short) is a modern military 3D turn-based strategy video game developed by British studio Rubicon Development. It has been released on App Store, Apple's App Store, Android, PC, iOS, Google, BlackBerry, and other platforms. The game features three environment types (snowy, regular, and desert), and 20 levels in the main campaign mode (10 extra in the Call of Booty campaign mode). Great Little War Game: All Out War includes the All Out War and Holiday from Hell campaign modes (both can be bought in the regular GLWG for iOS). An informally named sequel to the game, Great Big War Game, was released in 2012. A sequel to this game called Great Little War Game 2 was released in mid-2014. A third sequel to the series called Epic Little War Game was released in 2017.

== Critical reception ==
On Metacritic, Great Little War Game has a score of 84% based on 5 critic reviews, and Great Little War Game 2 has a score of 75% based on 4 critic reviews.
