= 1-bit Ninja =

2011 video game

- App icon
- Developer: Kode80
- Publisher: Kode80
- Designer: Ben Hopkins
- Artist: Ben Hopkins
- Platform: iOS
- Release: June 23, 2011
- Genre: Platform
- Mode: Single-player

1-bit Ninja is a 2011 platform game developed and published by Kode80. In the game, the player controls a ninja who must avoid enemies and collect coins throughout thirty levels. The player may adjust the camera to a three-dimensional perspective to reveal hidden platforms. 1-bit Ninja was released on June 23, 2011, for iOS.

== Gameplay ==
In 1-bit Ninja, the player controls the Ninja, who can jump on enemies to defeat them. While the Ninja can move across the level, they cannot go backwards. The player is required to collect coins in each of the thirty levels. They may turn the camera to unlock a three-dimensional perspective that reveals hidden platforms. With the Tiled Map Editor, players can create their own levels.

== Development and release ==
1-bit Ninja was developed by Kode80, the studio of Ben Hopkins. He was inspired by his childhood experiences from playing the Game & Watch series. While the game was scheduled to be released at the end of May, 1-Bit Ninja was released for iOS on June 23, 2011. In October 2011, the game was given Game Center support and video exporting. In March 2012, a fifth world was added and a lite version was released, which contains five levels, checkpoints, and replays. In December 2014, the game was released for iOS 8 and iPad. An endless runner sequel titled 1-bit Ninja Remix Rush was released on January 8, 2015, for iOS.

== Reception ==
Reception

Aggregate score
Aggregator	Score
Metacritic	80/100

Review scores
Publication	Score
Gamezebo	100/100 (1-bit Ninja)
IGN	8/10 (1-bit Ninja); 8/10 (Remix Rush)
Pocket Gamer	4/5 (1-bit Ninja); 3.5/5 (Remix Rush)
TouchArcade	4.5/5 (1-bit Ninja); 4/5 (Remix Rush)

1-bit Ninja received a "generally favorable" rating on Metacritic. The pixelated art style was praised. Jared Nelson of TouchArcade praised the game's graphics for having a "ton of character and style".

=== 1-bit Ninja Remix Rush ===
The difficulty of the gameplay was received negatively. Carter Dotson of TouchArcade found that the challenging gameplay made players decide where they should move the player-character. Time magazine praised the game's ability to combine the "flattest gaming technology" with the third dimension.
