= Wasteland Angel =

2011 video game

- Developer: Octane Games
- Publisher: Meridian4
- Platforms: Windows, OnLive
- Release: September 1, 2011
- Genre: Vehicular combat
- Mode: Single-player

Wasteland Angel is a vehicular combat game created by the Finnish independent developer team Octane Games. Released on September 1, 2011, the game is published by Meridian4 for Windows and is distributed online through Steam, Impulse, GamersGate, Direct2Drive, and Amazon Download.

The game is set after a fictional World War III in a post-apocalyptic United States where various gangs prey on towns in which survivors from the war have gathered. The player assumes the role of the eponymous female protagonist, Angel, as she defends the towns and searches for her lost friend. The game is played from a bird's eye view as the player controls a car and its mounted machine guns in order to destroy enemies and vehicles. The players can find more powerful guns to attach to the car and can also use special weapons such as napalm or spike strips which are picked up after killing certain enemies.

The game was the first to be released under the Octane Games brand. It received average reviews from critics upon release, with IGN's Gord Goble writing that his main issue with the game was that it was very short and lacked any lasting appeal. Shortly after the game's release, an update was made available that added support for dual-monitors, support for editable key configurations, and more destructible objects to the game.

== Gameplay ==
Angel uses Gypsy's mounted machine guns to destroy enemy vehicles before they escape with enslaved townspeople

The story, told through the use of voiced and animated comic panels, centers on Angel, a heroine in a post-apocalyptic United States that travels from town to town protecting helpless survivors of the war from attacking gangs. Angel defends the towns using Gypsy, the name given to her armored car equipped with mounted machine guns. The game uses an overhead view as the player speeds around a small town using Gypsy's machine guns to repel enemy gangs known as Wastelanders. There are three types of Wastelanders and each one unleashes attacks in a different manner: The Slavers class will attempt to capture the townspeople, Killers will only attack the player, and Duals can take on either the role of attacking or capturing during a raid. When enemies are killed, they leave behind weapons for the player such as napalm, land mines, or Electromagnetic pulse bombs (EMPs); or they drop upgrades which improve the car's weapons or armor. The EMPs are used to temporarily disable all the enemies on the screen while the napalm and land mines can be set between waves as traps for unsuspecting Wastelanders. One weapon upgrade offers players incendiary ammunition for the car's machine guns which makes it easier to destroy enemies by lighting them on fire.

The game offers four different difficulty settings and includes online leaderboards which enumerate high scores that different players have achieved for the game. The game is segmented into protecting six different villages, and each village is broken up into four levels: a Day level, a Boss level, a Night level, and a bonus level. Levels are further broken into waves as increasingly difficult enemies attack the village. The bonus level drops the top-down camera view and is played from the perspective of the driver seat of the car. Boss levels confront the player with a boss enemy that is much stronger than the other enemies encountered in the game. Each boss requires the player to discover and employ a predefined strategy in order to defeat them. For example, the first boss is a giant steamroller with an attached flamethrower that can not be damaged by the car's regular guns and instead requires the use of napalm to destroy it.

== Plot ==
The game is set after a fictional World War III, the events of which have killed off much of the population; those left alive are forced to fight for survival. Some of the survivors have formed gangs, some turned into mutants from the war's radiation, and some joined an evil militia; collectively, these groups are known as Wastelanders. Raiding different towns and villages, the Wastelanders sought to prey on the townspeople by stealing supplies, forcing some into slavery, and killing others. The heroine of the story, Angel, travels from town to town in search of her lost friend, Ekx, while helping the town's survivors fend off attacks from Wastelanders. Cruising in her armored car, Gypsy, she makes use of the car's mounted machine guns to defend the towns from thieves and slavers. The first lead Angel finds on her lost friend is from the city of Core, where Ekx was seen traveling through the city on his way to Coalhaven. Angel reaches Coalhaven and uses her armored car to defend the city from members of the renegade militia. After repelling the enemy, the townspeople re-establish their wireless communications and contact the nearby city of New Dallas. Recognizing the voice on the other end, the receiving operator in New Dallas turns out to be Angel's lost friend, Ekx. Ekx confides in Angel that he needs her for something urgent and that she must join him in New Dallas.

Shortly after arriving, the city is forced to rally all of its survivors, including Angel and Ekx, in order to fend off an incoming attack from the Renegades. The two friends become separated during the fighting, but not before Ekx gives a mysterious book to Angel. After making her way to the city of Highwall, Angel encounters Wastelanders worshipping a mystic that claims the earth was not destroyed by nuclear war, but by a "crack in the universe." Angel is skeptical of these claims, although Ekx believes her to be the deliverer. After receiving a mission from Ekx, Angel heads through the badlands, north, to a survivor camp. Despite rumors that the place may be flooded, the game ends as Angel heads to New York to find out why Ekx has entrusted her with the mysterious book.

== Development ==
Wasteland Angel was first announced on May 17, 2011, with a prospective release date for summer of the same year. The game was developed by Octane Games, an independent development team in Kotka, Finland that is owned by Nitro Games. The company was founded in Spring 2011, shortly after Nitro Games completed the arcade shooter Woody Two-Legs. Wasteland Angel would be their first release under the Octane Games brand. Before the release, the group had already announced the second game they were working on: a pirate role-playing game titled Raven's Cry. Although Wasteland Angel is published by Meridian4, Raven's Cry was signed to be published by TopWare Interactive. In the announcement for Wasteland Angel, the publisher noted plans to make additional downloadable content available for the game after it was launched. In an August 2011 interview, Octane Games CEO Jussi Tähtinen stated that the company was focusing on multiplatform development and that Wasteland Angel seemed in ideal fit to be marketed for the Xbox 360 and PlayStation 3, but he declined to share any specific plans to bring the game to either platform. When asked about the possibility of a multiplayer mode, Tähtinen again declined to make any announcement.

== Release ==
Wasteland Angel was released on September 1, 2011, through online distribution networks: Steam, Impulse, GamersGate, Direct2Drive, and Amazon Download. In a press release for the game, Meridian4's Marketing Director Steve Milburn stated, "Much like the Honey Badger, Wasteland Angel is also 'pretty badass' " and provided a hyperlink to a satirical YouTube video about the honey badger. (Note: The linked YouTube video can be found at "The Crazy Nastyass Honey Badger (original narration by Randall) ".) The developers released a demo for the game on September 12 which included four stages with a boss fight. A September 2011 update for the game was also released which included support for dual-monitors, editable key configurations, and more destroyable objects available in the game.

== Reception ==
Reception

Aggregate score
Aggregator	Score
GameRankings	55%

Review scores
Publication	Score
IGN	5.0/10.0
Gamers Daily News	7.0/10.0
Gaming Nexus	D-

Wasteland Angel received average reviews upon release, garnering a rating of 55% on the review aggregation website GameRankings. Gamers Daily News' Jeff Lindsey appreciated the perspective change accompanying the bonus level, stating, "To be perfectly honest, I squealed with delight when I got to see the carnage first hand and create mayhem before your eyes." Strategy Informer was not as appreciative of the jump in perspective, noting that the game's maps and engine did not appear to be designed for the first-person perspective and the mode instead presented itself as "more than a little jarring." While Travis Huinker of Gaming Nexus criticized the game for having poor driving physics, Shack News's Jeff Mattas enjoyed the controls, stating, "Though there are certain liberties taken with the driving physics, they feel right at home with the frantic, arcade-style action." Ultimately, Huinker did not recommend the game, but Lindsey called it "the most fun game that I have played this year".
