= Z-Type =

2011 video game

- Developer: PhobosLab
- Designer: Dominic Szablewski
- Platforms: Web, Android, iOS
- Release: January 10, 2011

Z-Type is a typing shoot 'em up video game developed by Germany-based developer Dominic Szablewski of PhobosLab, originally developed for web browsers in 2011 and later released for mobile in 2016. Its gameplay is similar to Space Invaders and Mario Teaches Typing. Instead of shooting, players defeat enemies by typing on their keyboard. The smaller the number of errors, the higher the score.

== See also ==
- The Typing of the Dead
