= List of video games released in 2012 =

The following is a comprehensive index of all games released in 2012, sorted chronologically by release date, and divided by quarter. Information regarding developer, publisher, operating system, genre, and type of release is provided where available.

For a summary of 2012 in video games as a whole, see 2012 in video games.

== Legend ==
Video game platforms
3DS	Nintendo 3DS, 3DS Virtual Console, iQue 3DS	DROID	Android	DS	Nintendo DS, DSiWare, iQue DS
iOS	iOS, iPhone, iPod, iPadOS, iPad, visionOS, Apple Vision Pro	LIN	Linux, SteamOS	OSX	macOS
PS2	PlayStation 2	PS3	PlayStation 3	PSN	PlayStation Network
PSP	PlayStation Portable	PSV	PlayStation Vita	Wii	Wii, WiiWare, Wii Virtual Console
WiiU	Wii U, WiiU Virtual Console	WIN	Windows, all versions Windows 95 and up	XB360	Xbox 360, Xbox 360 Live Arcade

Types of releases
Compilation	A compilation, anthology or collection of several titles, usually (but not always) belonging to the same series
Early access	A game launched in early access is unfinished and thus might contain bugs and glitches or have some of the content missing
Episodic	An episodic video game that is released in batches over a period of time
Expansion	A large-scale DLC to an already existing game that adds new story, areas and additions and/or changes to the game's mechanics
Full release	A full release of a game that launched in early access first
Limited	A special release (often called "Limited" or "Collector's Edition") with bonus collector's material. Often provided to people who pre-order a game
Port	The game first appeared on a different platform and a port was made. The game is like the original, with few or no differences
Remake	The game is an enhanced remake of an original, made using a new engine and/or assets and thus containing completely new sound, graphics and possibly changes to the story and/or gameplay
Remaster	The game is a remaster of an original, released on the same or different platform, with (usually minor) changes to graphics, sound and/or gameplay
Rerelease	The game was re-released on the same platform with no or only minor changes

Video game genres
Action	Action game	Action RPG	Action role-playing game	Action-adventure	Action-adventure game
Adventure	Adventure game	Battle royale	Battle royale game	Brawler	Beat 'em up
City builder	City-building game	CMS	Construction and management simulation	DCCG	Digital collectible card game
Dungeon crawl	Dungeon crawl	Fighting	Fighting game	FPS	First-person shooter
Graphic adventure	Graphic adventure	Hack and slash	Hack and slash	Horror	Horror game
Metroidvania	Metroidvania	MMO	Massively multiplayer online game	MOBA	Multiplayer online battle arena
Music	Music video game	Party	Party video game	PCA	Point-and-click adventure
Platformer	Platformer	Puzzle	Puzzle video game	Puzzle-platformer	Puzzle-platformer
Racing	Racing video game	Rhythm	Rhythm game	Roguelike	Roguelike, Roguelite
RPG	Role-playing video game	RTS	Real-time strategy	RTT	Real-time tactics
Sandbox	Sandbox game	Shoot 'em up	Shoot 'em up	Shooter	Shooter game
Simulation	Simulation video game	Sports	Sports video game	Stealth	Stealth game
Strategy	Strategy video game	Survival	Survival game	Survival horror	Survival horror
Tactical RPG	Tactical role-playing game	Tactical shooter	Tactical shooter	TBS	Turn-based strategy
TBT	Turn-based tactics	TPS	Third-person shooter	Vehicle sim	Vehicle simulation game
Vehicular combat	Vehicular combat game	Visual novel	Visual novel	Walking sim	Walking simulator

== List ==
=== January–March ===
Release date	Title	Platform	Type	Genre	Developer	Publisher	Ref.
January 4	Katawa Shoujo	WIN		Visual novel	Four Leaf Studios	Four Leaf Studios	
January 4	NFL Blitz	PSN, XB360					
January 6	Q.U.B.E.	WIN					
January 10	Choplifter HD	WIN					
January 10	Crazy Machine Elements	PSN					
January 10	Mecho Wars	PSN					
January 11	Amy	XB360					
January 12	Run Roo Run	iOS					
January 12	Zen Pinball 3D	3DS					
January 17	Amy	PSN					
January 17	Dustforce	WIN					
January 17	Zack Zero	PS3					
January 18	Caverns of Minos	iOS					
January 18	Haunt	XB360					
January 18	Scarygirl	PSN, WIN, XB360					
January 19	Sonic the Hedgehog 4: Episode I	WIN	Port	Platformer	Sonic Team	SEGA	
January 19	Sonic the Hedgehog CD	WIN	Port	Platformer	Sonic Team	SEGA	
January 22	Jurassic Park: The Game - Episode 3: The Depths	iOS					
January 25	Oil Rush	WIN, LIN, OSX					
January 25	Puddle	XB360					
January 25	SOL: Exodus	WIN					
January 26	Dead Block	WIN					
January 26	Mutant Mudds	3DS					
January 26	Tropico 3: Gold Edition	OSX					
January 27	King Arthur II: The Role-playing Wargame	WIN					
January 30	Call of Cthulhu: The Wasted Land	iOS					
January 31	Puddle	PSN					
January 31	Final Fantasy XIII-2	PS3, XB360					
January 31	NeverDead	PS3, XB360					
January 31	Soulcalibur V	PS3, XB360					
February 1	Double Fine Happy Action Theater	XB360					
February 2	Ghost Trick: Phantom Detective	iOS	Port			Capcom	
February 2	Mortal Kombat: Arcade Kollection	WIN					
February 2	PixelJunk Eden	WIN					
February 2	Sakura Samurai: Art of the Sword	3DS				Nintendo	
February 3	The Simpsons Arcade Game	XB360					
February 7	The Darkness II	WIN, PS3, XB360	Original				
February 7	Gotham City Impostors	WIN, PSN					
February 7	Jak and Daxter Collection	PS3					
February 7	Kingdoms of Amalur: Reckoning	WIN, PS3, XB360					
February 7	Resident Evil: Revelations	3DS					
February 7	Shank 2	WIN, PSN					
February 7	The House of the Dead III	PSN					
February 7	The Simpsons Arcade Game	PSN					
February 8	Gotham City Impostors	XB360					
February 8	Shank 2	XB360					
February 9	Jagged Alliance: Back in Action	WIN					
February 10	Dariusburst Second Prologue	iOS					
February 13	Rhythm Heaven Fever	Wii					
February 14	BlazBlue: Continuum Shift Extend	PS3, XB360, PSV					
February 14	Crusader Kings II	WIN					
February 14	Grand Slam Tennis 2	PS3, XB360					
February 14	Mario & Sonic at the London 2012 Olympic Games	3DS					
February 14	Tales of the Abyss	3DS					
February 14	Tekken 3D: Prime Edition	3DS					
February 14	Twisted Metal	PS3					
February 14	UFC Undisputed 3	PS3, XB360					
February 14	Worms Ultimate Mayhem	PSN					
February 15	Asphalt: Injection	PSV					
February 15	Dear Esther	WIN, OSX					
February 15	F1 2011	PSV					
February 15	Little Deviants	PSV					
February 15	Michael Jackson: The Experience	PSV					
February 15	Rayman Origins	PSV	Port				
February 15	Uncharted: Golden Abyss	PSV					
February 15	Warp	XB360					
February 16	Alan Wake	WIN	Port				
February 16	Beat Sneak Bandit	iOS					
February 17	ZiGGURAT	iOS					
February 21	Asura's Wrath	PS3, XB360					
February 21	Cliff Diving	PSV					
February 21	Metal Gear Solid: Snake Eater 3D	3DS	Port			Konami	
February 21	Syndicate	WIN, PS3, XB360					
February 21	Tales from Space: Mutant Blobs Attack	PSV					
February 21	WWE WrestleFest	iOS					
February 21	Zuma's Revenge!	DS					
February 22	1000 Amps	WIN					
February 22	Alan Wake's American Nightmare	XB360	Original				
February 22	Army Corps of Hell	PSV					
February 22	Ben 10: Galactic Racing	PSV					
February 22	Dillon's Rolling Western	3DS					
February 22	Dungeon Hunter: Alliance	PSV					
February 22	Dynasty Warriors Next	PSV					
February 22	Escape Plan	PSV					
February 22	Hot Shots Golf: World Invitational	PSV					
February 22	FIFA Football	PSV					
February 22	Hustle Kings	PSV					
February 22	Lumines: Electronic Symphony	PSV					
February 22	ModNation Racers: Road Trip	PSV					
February 22	Ninja Gaiden Sigma Plus	PSV					
February 22	Plants vs. Zombies	PSV	Port			PopCap Games	
February 22	Shinobido 2: Revenge of Zen	PSV					
February 22	Super Stardust Delta	PSV					
February 22	Touch My Katamari	PSV					
February 22	Ultimate Marvel vs. Capcom 3	PSV					
February 22	Virtua Tennis 4: World Tour Edition	PSV					
February 22	Wipeout 2048	PSV					
February 23	Wargame: European Escalation	WIN					
February 24	Gridrunner iOS	iOS					
February 27	Ib	WIN					
February 27	PokéPark 2: Wonders Beyond	Wii					
February 27	Zombies, Run!	iOS					
February 28	Auditorium	WIN, OSX					
February 28	Binary Domain	PS3, XB360					
February 28	Hyperdimension Neptunia Mk2	PS3					
February 28	Mortal Kombat: Komplete Edition	PS3, XB360					
February 28	Primal	PSN					
February 28	Shin Megami Tensei: Devil Survivor 2	DS					
February 28	SSX	PS3, XB360					
February 29	Microsoft Flight	WIN					
February 29	Nexuiz	XB360					
February 29	Prince of Persia Classic	iOS	Port				
February 29	Wakfu	WIN, LIN, OSX					
March 1	Deep Black: Reloaded	WIN					
March 1	The Simpsons: Tapped Out	iOS					
March 1	Vessel	WIN					
March 6	Blades of Time	PS3, XB360					
March 6	Crush 3D	3DS					
March 6	Lego Harry Potter: Years 5–7	PSV					
March 6	Major League Baseball 2K12	WIN, PS3, XB360, Wii, PS2, PSP, DS					
March 6	Mass Effect 3	WIN, PS3, XB360	Original				
March 6	Mass Effect Infiltrator	iOS, DROID					
March 6	MLB 12: The Show	PS3, PSV					
March 6	MotorStorm: RC	PS3, PSV					
March 6	Nicktoons MLB 3D	3DS					
March 6	The Sims 3: Showtime	WIN, OSX					
March 6	Stacking	WIN					
March 6	Street Fighter X Tekken	PS3, XB360					
March 6	Top Gun: Hard Lock	PS3, WIN, XB360					
March 6	Unit 13	PSV					
March 7	I Am Alive	XB360					
March 8	Fun! Fun! Minigolf TOUCH!	3DS					
March 8	Waking Mars	WIN, OSX, iOS, DROID					
March 11	Mario Party 9	Wii					
March 13	Birds of Steel	PS3, XB360					
March 13	FIFA Street	PS3, XB360					
March 13	Journey	PSN					
March 13	Naruto Shippuden: Ultimate Ninja Storm Generations	PS3, XB360					
March 13	Reality Fighters	PSV					
March 13	Ridge Racer	PSV					
March 13	Shoot Many Robots	PSN					
March 13	Silent Hill: Downpour	PS3, XB360					
March 13	Tales of Graces ƒ	PS3					
March 13	Warp	WIN, PSN					
March 13	Yakuza: Dead Souls	PS3					
March 14	Defenders of Ardania	XB360, WIN					
March 14	Shoot Many Robots	XB360					
March 15	Chaos Rings II	iOS					
March 15	Dungeon Defenders	OSX	Port				
March 15	RPG Maker VX Ace	WIN					
March 19	Ys: The Oath in Felghana	WIN					
March 20	Armored Core V	PS3, XB360					
March 20	Kinect Rush: A Disney-Pixar Adventure	XB360					
March 20	Ninja Gaiden 3	PS3, XB360					
March 20	Resident Evil: Operation Raccoon City	PS3, XB360					
March 20	Silent Hill HD Collection	PS3, XB360					
March 20	Sumioni: Demon Arts	PSV					
March 20	Warriors Orochi 3	PS3					
March 21	Mutant Storm Reloaded	WIN					
March 21	Sine Mora	XB360					
March 22	Angry Birds Space	WIN, OSX, iOS					
March 23	Kid Icarus: Uprising	3DS					
March 23	Rayman 3 HD	PSN, XB360	Port				
March 23	Total War: Shogun 2 – Fall of the Samurai	WIN					
March 27	Capcom Digital Collection	XB360	Compilation				
March 27	Closure	PSN					
March 27	Country Dance All Stars	XB360					
March 27	Gettysburg: Armored Warfare	WIN					
March 27	Ridge Racer Unbounded	WIN, PS3, XB360					
March 27	Supremacy MMA: Unrestricted	PSV					
March 27	Temple Run	DROID					
March 27	Tiger Woods PGA Tour 13	PS3, XB360					
March 27	Tropico 4: Modern Times	XB360					
March 27	Warriors Orochi 3	XB360					
March 28	Spin Up	iOS					
March 28	Wrecked: Revenge Revisited	PSN, XB360					
March 29	BioShock 2	OSX					
March 29	Pac-Man Games	iOS					
March 29	Rayman Origins	WIN	Port				
March 29	Rinth Island	iOS					
March 30	South Park: Tenorman's Revenge	XB360					
March 31	Trine 2	LIN					

=== April–June ===
Release date	Title	Platform	Type	Genre	Developer	Publisher	Ref.
April 3	Blacklight: Retribution	WIN					
April 3	Canabalt	PSP					
April 3	Devil May Cry: HD Collection	PS3, XB360	Compilation			Capcom	
April 3	I Am Alive	PSN					
April 3	Kinect Star Wars	XB360					
April 4	Diabolical Pitch	XB360					
April 4	The Pinball Arcade	XB360					
April 5	Bug Princess 2	iOS					
April 5	Colors! 3D	3DS					
April 5	Confrontation	WIN					
April 5	Saturday Morning RPG	iOS					
April 6	Anomaly: Warzone Earth	XB360					
April 6	Shoot Many Robots	WIN					
April 6	Xenoblade Chronicles	Wii	Original	Action RPG	MonolithSoft	Nintendo	
April 10	Naval War: Arctic Circle	WIN					
April 10	Skullgirls	PSN					
April 10	The Pinball Arcade	PS3, PSV					
April 10	Treasures Of Montezuma: Blitz	PSV					
April 10	World Gone Sour	PSN					
April 11	Avernum: Escape from the Pit	WIN					
April 11	Burnout Crash!	iOS					
April 11	Legend of Grimrock	WIN					
April 11	Skullgirls	XB360					
April 11	The Splatters	XB360					
April 11	World Gone Sour	XB360					
April 12	Ketzal's Corridors	3DS					
April 12	Max Payne Mobile	iOS					
April 12	Men of War: Condemned Heroes	WIN					
April 12	Tribes: Ascend	WIN					
April 13	Fez	XB360					
April 13	Spirit Camera: The Cursed Memoir	3DS					
April 15	SCP: Containment Breach	WIN					
April 16	Superbrothers: Sword & Sworcery EP	WIN					
April 17	Disgaea 3: Absence of Detention	PSV					
April 17	The House of the Dead 4	PSN					
April 17	Insanely Twisted Shadow Planet	WIN					
April 17	Radiant Defense	iOS					
April 17	StarDrone Extreme	PSV					
April 17	The Witcher 2: Assassins of Kings Enhanced Edition	XB360					
April 18	Super Monday Night Combat	WIN					
April 18	Trials Evolution	XB360					
April 19	3D Classics: Kid Icarus	3DS					
April 20	Blades of Time	WIN, OSX					
April 20	The Darkness II	OSX					
April 23	Lone Survivor	WIN					
April 23	Serious Sam 3: BFE	OSX					
April 24	Darkstalkers 3	PSN	Port				
April 24	Prototype 2	PS3, XB360	Original				
April 24	Shifting World	3DS					
April 24	UEFA Euro 2012	WIN, PS3, XB360					
April 25	Bloodforge	XB360					
April 25	Marvel vs. Capcom 2: New Age of Heroes	iOS	Port				
April 25	The Walking Dead: Episode 1 – A New Day	WIN, PSN, OSX	Episodic				
April 26	Deus Ex: Human Revolution Ultimate Edition	OSX					
April 26	Scarface	iOS					
April 27	Binary Domain	WIN					
April 27	Risen 2: Dark Waters	WIN					
April 27	The Walking Dead: Episode 1 – A New Day	XB360	Port				
April 29	The Desolate hope	WIN	Original	Action-Adventure RPG	Scott Cawthon		
May 1	Doc Clock: The Toasted Sandwich of Time	PSN					
May 1	TERA	WIN					
May 1	Sniper Elite V2	WIN, PS3, XB360	Original				
May 1	The Legend of Dragoon	PSN					
May 1	Mortal Kombat: Komplete Edition	PSV					
May 2	Fable Heroes	XB360					
May 3	Nexuiz	WIN					
May 3	Robbery Bob	iOS					
May 4	Port Royale 3: Pirates & Merchants	WIN					
May 8	Starhawk	PS3					
May 8	Nancy Drew: Tomb of the Lost Queen	WIN, OSX					
May 9	LostWinds 2: Winter of the Melodias	iOS					
May 9	Minecraft	XB360	Port				
May 10	N.O.V.A. 3	iOS					
May 11	Street Fighter X Tekken	WIN	Port				
May 13	Soul Sacrifice	PSV					
May 15	Akai Katana	XB360					
May 15	Battleship	PS3, XB360, DS, 3DS					
May 15	Diablo III	WIN, OSX					
May 15	Game of Thrones	WIN, PS3, XB360					
May 15	Max Payne 3	PS3, XB360	Original	TPS	Rockstar Studios	Rockstar Games	
May 15	PixelJunk 4am	PSN					
May 15	Sonic the Hedgehog 4: Episode II	WIN, PSN					
May 16	Sonic the Hedgehog 4: Episode II	XB360					
May 17	Sonic the Hedgehog 4: Episode II	iOS					
May 18	Dragon's Lair	XB360					
May 18	Resident Evil: Operation Raccoon City	WIN					
May 20	Mario Tennis Open	3DS					
May 22	Alan Wake's American Nightmare	WIN	Port	TPS	Remedy Entertainment		
May 22	Dungeons & Dragons: Daggerdale	PSN					
May 22	Dragon's Dogma	PS3, XB360					
May 22	MIB: Alien Crisis	PS3, XB360, Wii					
May 22	Sorcery	PS3					
May 22	Table Top Tanks	PSV					
May 22	Tom Clancy's Ghost Recon: Future Soldier	PS3, XB360					
May 23	Dirt: Showdown	WIN					
May 23	Joy Ride Turbo	XB360					
May 23	Doctor Who: The Eternity Clock	PSN					
May 24	Pastry Panic	iOS					
May 24	Virtua Tennis Challenge	iOS					
May 26	Plague Inc.	iOS					
May 27	Deer Drive Legends	3DS					
May 28	The Binding of Isaac: Wrath of the Lamb	WIN, OSX					
May 29	Atelier Meruru: The Apprentice of Arland	PS3					
May 29	Mad Riders	PSN					
May 29	Resistance: Burning Skies	PSV					
May 29	Ys Origin	WIN					
May 30	Mad Riders	WIN, XB360					
May 31	Fortune Street Smart	iOS					
June 1	Home	WIN					
June 1	Max Payne 3	WIN	Port	TPS	Rockstar Studios	Rockstar Games	
June 2	Long Live the Queen	WIN					
June 4	Madagascar: Join the Circus!	iOS					
June 5	Inversion	PS3, XB360					
June 5	Madagascar 3: The Video Game	3DS, DS, PS3, Wii, XB360					
June 6	Bang Bang Racing	XB360					
June 7	Art of Balance Touch!	3DS					
June 8	Bang Bang Racing	WIN					
June 10	Pikmin 2	Wii	Port				
June 12	Dirt: Showdown	PS3, XB360					
June 12	Gravity Rush	PSV					
June 12	Metal Gear Solid HD Collection	PSV	Compilation				
June 12	Gungnir	PSP					
June 12	Lollipop Chainsaw (US)	PS3, XB360		Hack and slash	Grasshopper Manufacture	Warner Bros. Interactive Entertainment	
June 12	Order Up!!	3DS					
June 12	Sins of a Solar Empire: Rebellion	WIN					
June 13	Doctor Who: The Eternity Clock	PSV					
June 14	Pocket Planes	iOS					
June 15	Lollipop Chainsaw (EU)	PS3, XB360		Hack and slash	Grasshopper Manufacture	Warner Bros. Interactive Entertainment	
June 17	Heroes of Ruin	3DS					
June 18	Pokémon Conquest	DS					
June 19	Brave	WIN, PS3, XB360, Wii, PSV, DS, 3DS					
June 19	Civilization V: Gods & Kings	WIN, OSX					
June 19	Lego Batman 2: DC Super Heroes	WIN, PS3, XB360, Wii, PSV, 3DS					
June 19	Magicka: The Other Side of the Coin	WIN					
June 19	Steel Battalion: Heavy Armor	XB360					
June 19	Tomba!	PSN					
June 20	Magic: The Gathering – Duels of the Planeswalkers 2013	WIN, PSN, XB360, iOS					
June 21	Asphalt 7: Heat	iOS					
June 21	Quantum Conundrum	WIN					
June 21	Sliterlink by Nikoli	3DS					
June 22	RayStorm	iOS					
June 23	Pokémon Black and White 2 (Japan)	DS					
June 25	Asphalt 7: Heat	DROID					
June 25	Penny Arcade Adventures - Episode 3	WIN, OSX					
June 26	The Amazing Spider-Man	DS, PS3, XB360, Wii, 3DS					
June 26	Just Dance: Best Of	XB360, Wii					
June 26	London 2012	WIN, PS3, XB360					
June 26	Resident Evil: The Umbrella Chronicles	PSN					
June 26	Spec Ops: The Line	WIN, PS3, XB360	Original				
June 26	Tom Clancy's Ghost Recon: Future Soldier	WIN					
June 26	Unchained Blades	PSP					
June 27	Record of Agarest War 2	PS3					
June 27	The Walking Dead: Episode 2 – Starved for Help	WIN, OSX, PSN, XB360, iOS	Episodic				
June 27	Final Fantasy III	DROID	Port				
June 28	The Amazing Spider-Man	DROID, iOS					
June 28	Where's My Perry?	iOS					
June 29	Mini Ninjas Adventures	XB360					

=== July–September ===
Release date	Title	Platform	Type	Genre	Developer	Publisher	Ref.
July 3	Feed Me Oil	DROID					
July 3	Test Drive: Ferrari Racing Legends	PS3, XB360					
July 3	The Secret World	WIN					
July 3	Theatrhythm Final Fantasy	3DS					
July 4	Spelunky	XB360					
July 10	Frogger: Hyper Arcade Edition	PSN					
July 10	NCAA Football 13	PS3, XB360					
July 10	Quantum Conundrum	PSN					
July 10	Rainbow Moon	PSN					
July 10	Rhythm Thief & the Emperor's Treasure	3DS					
July 10	Summer Stars 2012	PS3, Wii					
July 11	Quantum Conundrum	XB360					
July 11	Anna	WIN					
July 12	AFL Live: Game of the Year Edition	WIN, PS3, XB360					
July 12	Amazing Alex	DROID, iOS					
July 12	Dark Scavenger	WIN, OSX		PCA	Psydra Games		
July 12	Metal Slug 3	iOS	Port				
July 12	Tiny Wings 2	iOS					
July 13	La-Mulana	WIN					
July 17	Heroes of Ruin	3DS					
July 17	Dyad	PSN					
July 18	Tony Hawk's Pro Skater HD	XB360					
July 19	Fieldrunners 2	iOS					
July 23	Jurassic Park Builder	iOS					
July 24	Malicious	PS3					
July 24	Prototype 2	WIN	Port				
July 24	Puddle	PSV					
July 25	Wreckateer	XB360					
July 26	Slydris	iOS					
July 26	SolaRola	iOS					
July 26	The Walking Dead: Episode 1 - A New Day	iOS	Port				
July 27	Inversion	WIN					
July 28	Warsow	WIN, OSX, LIN					
July 30	Orcs Must Die! 2	WIN					
July 30	The Undead Syndrome	XB360					
July 31	Kingdom Hearts 3D: Dream Drop Distance	3DS					
July 31	Risen 2: Dark Waters	PS3, XB360					
July 31	Growlanser Wayfarer of Time	PSP					
July 31	War of the Monsters	PSN					
August 1	Deadlight	XB360					
August 2	Clash of Clans	DROID, iOS					
August 3	Ghostbusters: Paranormal Blast	iOS					
August 7	Babel Rising	WIN					
August 7	Persona 4 Arena	PS3, XB360					
August 7	Sound Shapes	PSN					
August 8	Hybrid	XB360					
August 9	Chimpact	iOS					
August 9	Unmechanical	WIN					
August 10	The Amazing Spider-Man	WIN					
August 13	Sanctum	OSX					
August 13	Iron Brigade	WIN					
August 14	Darksiders II	WIN, PS3, XB360					
August 14	The Last Story	Wii					
August 14	Papo & Yo	PSN					
August 14	Sleeping Dogs	WIN, PS3, XB360	Original				
August 15	Dust: An Elysian Tail	XB360					
August 15	Tales from Space: Mutant Blobs Attack	WIN					
August 19	New Super Mario Bros. 2	3DS					
August 21	Counter-Strike: Global Offensive	WIN, PSN, XB360, OSX					
August 21	The Expendables 2 Video game	WIN, PSN, XB360					
August 21	Jojo's Bizarre Adventure HD	PSN					
August 21	Legasista	PSN					
August 21	Retro/Grade	PSN					
August 21	Transformers: Fall of Cybertron	WIN, PS3, XB360					
August 21	Way of the Samurai 4	PSN					
August 22	Jojo's Bizarre Adventure HD	XB360					
August 22	My Singing Monsters	DROID, iOS					
August 23	Abyss	DS					
August 24	Dark Souls: Prepare to Die Edition	WIN					
August 24	Jagged Alliance: Crossfire	WIN					
August 25	Titans Mobile	DROID, iOS					
August 27	The World Ends with You	iOS	Port				
August 28	God of War Saga	PS3					
August 28	Guild Wars 2	WIN					
August 28	Madden NFL 13	PS3, XB360, Wii, PSV					
August 28	Psychonauts	PS3					
August 28	Ratchet & Clank Collection	PS3					
August 28	Rock Band Blitz	PSN					
August 28	Tony Hawk's Pro Skater HD	PSN					
August 28	The Walking Dead: Episode 3 – Long Road Ahead	PSN					
August 29	Bastion	iOS					
August 29	Rock Band Blitz	XB360					
August 29	The Walking Dead: Episode 3 – Long Road Ahead	WIN, XB360					
August 30	Blast-A-Way	iOS					
August 30	Mutant Mudds	WIN					
August 30	Snapshot	WIN					
August 31	Cypher	WIN, OSX					
August 31	Final Fantasy Dimensions	DROID, iOS					
September 3	Sacred Gold	LIN					
September 4	The Sims 3: Supernatural	WIN, OSX					
September 4	Zen Pinball 2	PSN					
September 5	Kung Fu Strike: The Warrior's Rise	XB360					
September 6	Trine 2: Goblin Menace	WIN, OSX					
September 6	I Am Alive	WIN					
September 7	Closure	WIN, OSX					
September 7	Mark of the Ninja	XB360					
September 9	Middens	WIN, OSX					
September 11	Anomaly: Warzone Earth	PSN					
September 11	Critter Crunch	WIN					
September 11	Double Dragon Neon	PSN					
September 11	Finding Nemo: Escape to the Big Blue Special Edition	3DS					
September 11	NBA Baller Beats	XB360					
September 11	NHL 13	PS3, XB360					
September 11	Tekken Tag Tournament 2	PS3, XB360					
September 12	Double Dragon Neon	XB360					
September 13	Prince of Persia Classic	DROID					
September 13	Fractured Soul	3DS					
September 14	Disney Princess: My Fairytale Adventure	3DS, Wii, WIN					
September 14	FTL: Faster Than Light	WIN, LIN, OSX					
September 14	Joe Danger 2: The Movie	XB360					
September 16	Kirby's Dream Collection: Special Edition	Wii	Limited				
September 18	Borderlands 2	WIN, PS3, XB360					
September 18	F1 2012	WIN, PS3, XB360					
September 18	Hotel Transylvania	3DS, DS					
September 18	Jet Set Radio HD	PSN	Port				
September 18	Tony Hawk's Pro Skater HD	WIN	Port				
September 18	Zuma's Revenge!	XB360	Port				
September 19	Demons' Score	iOS, DROID					
September 19	Jet Set Radio HD	WIN, XB360	Port				
September 20	La-Mulana	Wii					
September 20	Rayman Jungle Run	iOS, DROID					
September 20	Torchlight II	WIN, OSX					
September 22	Pocket Planes	DROID					
September 25	Angry Birds Trilogy	XB360, PS3, 3DS	Compilation				
September 25	Dead or Alive 5	PS3, XB360					
September 25	FIFA 13	WIN, PS3, XB360, Wii, PSV, PSP, PS2, iOS					
September 25	Final Fantasy III	PSP					
September 25	Grand Theft Auto III	PSN					
September 25	Hell Yeah! Wrath of the Dead Rabbit	PSN					
September 25	Lalaloopsy: Carnival of Friends	3DS					
September 25	LittleBigPlanet PS Vita	PSV	Port				
September 25	Maison de Maou	XB360					
September 25	Marvel vs. Capcom Origins	PSN					
September 25	One Piece: Pirate Warriors	PS3					
September 25	Pro Evolution Soccer 2013	WIN, PS3, XB360					
September 25	The Testament of Sherlock Holmes	WIN, PS3, XB360					
September 25	Tokyo Jungle	PSN					
September 25	World of Warcraft: Mists of Pandaria	WIN, OSX	Expansion				
September 25	Yumby Toss	iOS					
September 26	Castle Crashers	WIN					
September 26	Hell Yeah! Wrath of the Dead Rabbit	XB360					
September 26	Marvel vs. Capcom Origins	XB360					
September 27	Bad Piggies	iOS, DROID, WIN, OSX					
September 27	Ether Vapor Remaster	WIN					
September 27	Half-Minute Hero	WIN					
September 27	Super Monsters Ate My Condo	iOS					
September 27	The Denpa Men: They Came By Wave	3DS					

=== October–December ===
Release date	Title	Platform	Type	Genre	Developer	Publisher	Ref.
October 1	Art Academy: Lessons for Everyone!	3DS					
October 1	Crosswords Plus	3DS					
October 2	Carrier Command: Gaea Mission	WIN, XB360					
October 2	NBA 2K13	WIN, XB360, PS3, PSP, Wii					
October 2	New Little King's Story	PSV					
October 2	Nights into Dreams HD	PSN					
October 2	Resident Evil 6	PS3, XB360	Original				
October 2	Sonic Adventure 2	PSN	Remaster				
October 2	War of the Roses	WIN					
October 2	Port Royale 3: Pirates & Merchants	PS3, XB360					
October 3	Hell Yeah! Wrath of the Dead Rabbit	WIN					
October 4	Cave Story	3DS					
October 5	Nights into Dreams HD	XB360					
October 5	Sonic Adventure 2	XB360	Remaster				
October 7	Pokémon Black 2 and White 2 (North America)	DS					
October 7	Top Trumps: NBA All Stars	3DS					
October 9	Code of Princess	3DS					
October 9	Dishonored	WIN, PS3, XB360					
October 9	Dragon Ball Z: For Kinect	XB360					
October 9	Fable: The Journey	XB360					
October 9	The Walking Dead: Episode 4 – Around Every Corner	PSN	Episodic				
October 9	Joe Danger 2: The Movie	PSN					
October 9	Just Dance 4	Wii, PS3, XB360					
October 9	Machinarium	PS3					
October 9	Retro City Rampage	PSN, WIN					
October 9	Spy Hunter	3DS, PSV					
October 9	XCOM: Enemy Unknown	WIN, PS3, XB360					
October 10	Chaos Rings	DROID					
October 10	Crazy Taxi	iOS	Port				
October 10	The Walking Dead: Episode 4 – Around Every Corner	WIN, XB360	Episodic				
October 10	Naughty Bear: Panic in Paradise	PSN, XB360					
October 11	Devil's Attorney	iOS					
October 11	Michael Phelps: Push the Limit	XB360					
October 11	Of Orcs and Men	WIN, PS3, XB360					
October 14	Haunting at Cliffhouse	WIN		PCA	Cindy Pondillo		
October 15	The Lord of the Rings Online: Riders of Rohan	WIN					
October 15	Rocketbirds: Hardboiled Chicken	WIN					
October 16	007 Legends	PS3, XB360					
October 16	Chivalry: Medieval Warfare	WIN					
October 16	Dance Central 3	XB360					
October 16	Doom 3: BFG Edition	WIN, XB360, PS3					
October 16	Mark of the Ninja	WIN					
October 16	Rocksmith	WIN					
October 16	RollerCoaster Tycoon 3D	3DS					
October 16	Silent Hill: Book of Memories	PSV					
October 17	Carmageddon	iOS					
October 17	Fairy Bloom Freesia	WIN					
October 17	Serious Sam 3: BFE	XB360					
October 17	Viking: Battle for Asgard	WIN					
October 18	Sonic Jump	iOS					
October 18	The Witcher 2: Assassins of Kings	OSX					
October 19	Euro Truck Simulator 2	WIN					
October 21	Michael Jackson: The Experience	OSX					
October 21	Skylanders: Giants	PS3, XB360, Wii, 3DS					
October 21	Style Savvy: Trendsetters	3DS					
October 23	A Game of Dwarves	WIN					
October 23	Elemental: Fallen Enchantress	WIN					
October 23	Forza Horizon	XB360					
October 23	Giana Sisters: Twisted Dreams	WIN					
October 23	Hotline Miami	WIN					
October 23	Killzone HD	PSN					
October 23	Medal of Honor: Warfighter	WIN, PS3, XB360					
October 23	Nancy Drew: The Deadly Device	WIN, OSX					
October 23	Orgarhythm	PSV					
October 23	Street Fighter X Tekken	PSV	Port				
October 23	The Unfinished Swan	PSN					
October 23	Zero Escape: Virtue's Last Reward	3DS, PSV					
October 24	Guilty Gear XX Accent Core Plus	XB360					
October 24	Letterpress	iOS					
October 24	Robbery Bob	DROID					
October 25	Deadlight	WIN					
October 25	He-Man: The Most Powerful Game in the Universe	iOS					
October 25	Liberation Maiden	3DS					
October 25	NightSky	3DS					
October 25	The Fool and His Money	WIN, OSX					
October 27	Pinball FX 2	XB360					
October 28	Professor Layton and the Miracle Mask	3DS					
October 29	Guns of Icarus Online	WIN, OSX					
October 29	Primal Carnage	WIN					
October 30	Assassin's Creed III	PS3, XB360	Original				
October 30	Assassin's Creed III: Liberation	PSV					
October 30	Bratz: Fashion Boutique	3DS, DS					
October 30	LEGO The Lord of the Rings: The Video Game	PSV, 3DS, DS					
October 30	Marvel Avengers: Battle for Earth	XB360					
October 30	Need for Speed: Most Wanted	WIN, XB360, PS3, PSV, iOS, DROID					
October 30	Nike+ Kinect Training	XB360					
October 30	Ōkami HD	PSN	Port				
October 30	Smart As...	PSV					
October 30	Sports Champions 2	PS3					
October 30	Toy Story Mania!	PS3, XB360					
October 30	Transformers: Prime – The Game	Wii, DS, 3DS					
October 30	WWE '13	PS3, XB360, Wii					
October 30	Zone of the Enders HD Collection	PS3, XB360					
October 31	Natural Selection 2	WIN					
October 31	Painkiller: Hell & Damnation	WIN					
October 31	Pid	WIN, OSX, XB360, PSN					
November 2	007 Legends	WIN					
November 2	Football Manager 2013	WIN, OSX					
November 2	Postal 2: Complete	WIN, OSX, LIN	Rerelease				
November 6	Bubble Guppies	DS					
November 6	Dragon Ball Z Budokai: HD Collection	PS3, XB360					
November 6	Halo 4	XB360					
November 6	Harvest Moon: A New Beginning	3DS					
November 6	History Legends of War: Patton	PS3, XB360, WIN					
November 6	LittleBigPlanet Karting	PS3					
November 6	Midway Arcade Origins	PS3, XB360					
November 6	NASCAR The Game: Inside Line	PS3, Wii, XB360					
November 6	Poptropica Adventures	DS					
November 6	Pro Evolution Soccer 2013	Wii, PS2, PSP					
November 6	Ragnarok Tactics	PSP					
November 6	Rayman Origins	3DS	Port				
November 6	ToeJam & Earl in Panic on Funkotron	PSN					
November 7	Karateka	XB360					
November 7	ToeJam & Earl in Panic on Funkotron	XB360					
November 8	Angry Birds Star Wars	WIN, OSX, iOS, DROID					
November 8	Cherry Tree High Comedy Club	WIN					
November 9	Puddle	WIN					
November 9	Sine Mora	WIN					
November 11	Paper Mario: Sticker Star	3DS					
November 12	Thomas Was Alone	WIN					
November 13	Call of Duty: Black Ops II	WIN, PS3, XB360	Original				
November 13	Call of Duty: Black Ops: Declassified	PSV					
November 13	F1 Race Stars	WIN, PS3, XB360					
November 13	Lego The Lord of the Rings: The Video Game	WIN, PS3, XB360, Wii					
November 13	Planets Under Attack	PSN					
November 13	Rabbids Rumble	3DS					
November 13	Rift: Storm Legion	WIN					
November 13	Scribblenauts Unlimited	3DS					
November 13	Wonderbook: Book of Spells	PS3					
November 13	Victorious: Taking the Lead	DS, Wii					
November 14	Candy Crush Saga	iOS					
November 14	Dream of Pixels	iOS, DROID					
November 14	Hungry Giraffe	iOS					
November 14	Planets Under Attack	XB360					
November 14	Puzzle & Dragons	iOS					
November 18	Assassin's Creed III	WiiU	Port				
November 18	Batman: Arkham City Armored Edition	WiiU					
November 18	Ben 10: Omniverse	WiiU					
November 18	Call of Duty: Black Ops II	WiiU	Port				
November 18	Chasing Aurora	WiiU					
November 18	Darksiders II	WiiU					
November 18	Epic Mickey: Power of Illusion	3DS					
November 18	Epic Mickey 2: The Power of Two	PS3, XB360, Wii, WiiU					
November 18	ESPN Sports Connection	WiiU					
November 18	FIFA Soccer 13	WiiU					
November 18	Game Party Champions	WiiU					
November 18	Just Dance 4	WiiU					
November 18	Little Inferno	WiiU					
November 18	Mass Effect 3: Special Edition	WiiU					
November 18	Mighty Switch Force! Hyper Drive Edition	WiiU					
November 18	Nano Assault Neo	WiiU					
November 18	New Super Mario Bros. U	WiiU					
November 18	Ninja Gaiden 3: Razor's Edge	WiiU					
November 18	Nintendo Land	WiiU					
November 18	Rabbids Land	WiiU					
November 18	Scribblenauts Unlimited	WiiU					
November 18	Sing Party	WiiU					
November 18	Skylanders: Giants	WiiU					
November 18	Sonic & All-Stars Racing Transformed	WiiU, PS3, XB360					
November 18	Tank! Tank! Tank!	WiiU					
November 18	Tekken Tag Tournament 2	WiiU					
November 18	Transformers: Prime – The Game	WiiU					
November 18	Trine 2: Director's Cut	WiiU					
November 18	Warriors Orochi 3: Hyper	WiiU					
November 18	Wipeout: The Game 3	WiiU					
November 18	Your Shape: Fitness Evolved 2013	WiiU					
November 18	ZombiU	WiiU					
November 19	Little Inferno	WIN					
November 19	Scribblenauts Unlimited	WIN					
November 19	Sonic Adventure 2	WIN	Port				
November 20	Adventure Time: Hey Ice King! Why'd You Steal Our Garbage?!	3DS, DS					
November 20	Assassin's Creed III	WIN	Port				
November 20	Borderlands 2	OSX					
November 20	Clan of Champions	PS3, WIN, XB360					
November 20	Family Guy: Back to the Multiverse	WIN, PS3, XB360					
November 20	Groove Coaster Zero	iOS					
November 20	Hitman: Absolution	WIN, PS3, XB360					
November 20	Jet Set Radio HD	PSV					
November 20	Persona 4 Golden	PSV					
November 20	PlanetSide 2	WIN					
November 20	PlayStation All-Stars Battle Royale	PS3, PSV					
November 20	Rise of the Guardians: The Video Game	PS3, XB360, Wii, 3DS, DS					
November 20	Scribblenauts Unlimited	WIN					
November 20	Sine Mora	PSN, PSV					
November 20	The Walking Dead: Episode 5 – No Time Left	PS3	Episodic				
November 21	Rage of the Gladiator	DROID, iOS					
November 21	The Walking Dead: Episode 5 - No Time Left	WIN, XB360, OSX, iOS	Episodic				
November 22	Crashmo	3DS					
November 27	American Mensa Academy	3DS					
November 27	Fighting Vipers	PSN	Port				
November 27	Ratchet & Clank: Full Frontal Assault	PSN, PSV					
November 27	Sonic the Fighters	PSN	Port				
November 27	Super Hexagon	WIN, OSX					
November 27	Virtua Fighter 2	PSN					
November 28	Baldur's Gate: Enhanced Edition	WIN					
November 28	Fighting Vipers	XB360	Port				
November 28	Miner Wars 2081	WIN					
November 28	Sonic the Fighters	XB360	Port				
November 28	Stealth Bastard Deluxe	WIN					
November 28	Virtua Fighter 2	XB360					
November 28	Under Defeat HD	PS3					
November 29	Aero Porter	3DS					
November 29	Jet Set Radio HD	iOS, DROID					
November 30	Football Manager Handheld 2013	PSP					
November 30	Red Bull Crashed Ice Kinect	XB360					
December 4	Eve Online: Retribution	WIN					
December 4	Family Party: 30 Great Games Obstacle Arcade	WiiU					
December 4	Far Cry 3 (NA)	WIN, PS3, XB360	Original	FPS	Ubisoft Montreal	Ubisoft	
December 4	Guardians of Middle-earth	PSN, XB360					
December 4	Guilty Gear XX Λ Core Plus	PSN					
December 4	Marvel Avengers: Battle for Earth	WiiU					
December 4	Page Chronica	PS3					
December 4	Rise of the Guardians: The Video Game	WiiU					
December 4	Uncharted: Fight for Fortune	PSV					
December 6	Grand Theft Auto: Vice City 10th Anniversary Edition	iOS					
December 6	Modern Combat 4: Zero Hour	iOS, DROID					
December 6	Mutant Mudds	iOS					
December 7	Awesomenauts	OSX					
December 7	Baldur's Gate: Enhanced Edition	iOS	Port	RPG	Overhaul Games	Atari, Beamdog	
December 9	The Snowman and the Snowdog	iOS, DROID					
December 10	Test Drive: Ferrari Racing Legends	WIN					
December 11	007 Legends	WiiU					
December 11	Big Sky Infinity	PS3, PSV					
December 11	Black Knight Sword	PSN					
December 11	Grand Theft Auto: San Andreas	PSN					
December 11	Judge Dee: The City God Case	PSN					
December 12	Black Knight Sword	XB360					
December 12	Grand Theft Auto: Vice City 10th Anniversary Edition	DROID					
December 13	Batman: Arkham City Game of the Year Edition	OSX					
December 13	Crimson Shroud (NA)	3DS	Original	RPG	Level-5, Nex Entertainment	Level-5	
December 13	Middle Manager of Justice	iOS					
December 13	Theatrhythm Final Fantasy	iOS					
December 14	Candy Crush Saga	DROID					
December 14	Final Fantasy Airborne Brigade	DROID, iOS					
December 15	Yumby Toss	DROID					
December 17	Nights into Dreams HD	WIN					
December 17	Q.U.B.E.	OSX					
December 17	Street Fighter X Mega Man	WIN					
December 17	The War Z	WIN					
December 18	Burn the Rope	PSV					
December 18	Karateka	PS3					
December 18	Kinect Party	XB360					
December 18	Knytt Underground	PS3, PSV					
December 18	Oddworld: Stranger's Wrath	PSV					
December 18	Sonic & All-Stars Racing Transformed	PSV	Port				
December 20	F1 2012	OSX					
December 20	Final Fantasy IV	iOS	Port				
December 21	Sonic Jump	DROID					
December 21	I Get This Call Every Day	WIN, OSX					
December 24	Oddworld: Munch's Oddysee	PSN					
December 25	Hatoful Boyfriend: Holiday Star	WIN					
December 27	Fluidity: Spin Cycle	3DS					
December 31	Chronovolt	PSV					
December 31	Dahamkke Chachacha	iOS, DROID		Party	Turnon Games	Netmarble	
