= Bit City =

2017 video game

- App icon
- Developer: NimbleBit
- Publisher: NimbleBit
- Platforms: Android, iOS
- Release: March 13, 2017
- Genres: City-building, clicker
- Mode: Single-player

Bit City is a 2017 city-building and clicker game developed and published by NimbleBit. In it, the player must generate a steady coin income to build a city that meets a population quota. They may buy in-app purchases to boost their progress and can prestige, which returns them back to the first city with their upgrades and in-game currency Bux kept. Bit City was released on March 13, 2017, for Android and iOS. Its initial reception was mixed, with praise for its graphics and soundtrack but criticism for its technical performance and repetitive gameplay.

== Gameplay ==
In Bit City, the player has to build a city to meet a population quota.

Bit City is a city-building and clicker game. With a bird's-eye view, the player must build a city to reach a certain population; once fulfilled, the player can choose to start another city or keep improving the one they are on. Each city has a set number of different-sized plots; when a player decides to buy a plot, they are prompted to pick one of three districts: Residential, Business, or Service, which will build residential properties, businesses, and services respectively. However, if a district type is built too frequently, its demand and income will lower. Once a plot is built on, the population increases depending on the plot's size. They may rebuild on the same plot to upgrade a building's income.

The player can buy transportation—including cars, boats, and planes—from a vehicle garage; when tapped, it will reward them with coins or the in-game currency Bux. Bux can be purchased and used in-game to speed up construction or buy special buildings, which give bonuses for a district. The player may also obtain Bux by completing a mission where the same building must be built a specified amount of times. The amount of coins the player earns per second increases for every building and vehicle in the city, and a coin income compounds while the player is outside of the app.

Each city also has a government building for upgrading certain aspects of the city, such as the vehicle or zone payout; these upgrades will reset after the player moves on to a new city. Permanent upgrades apply to every city needing Bux; each new upgrade increases the amount of cash stored in the Pension Pig. The Pension Pig accumulates cash over time, and the player can buy it as an in-app purchase to claim the accumulated funds. The player may choose to prestige, sending them to the first city with their upgrades and Bux intact and giving them keys with a collective earning bonus. Later, the player unlocks moon cities, containing satellites and moon rovers.

== Release ==
Bit City was developed by NimbleBit, who previously created mobile games such as Tiny Tower and Pocket Trains. The studio's co-founder, Dave Marsh, tweeted building designs in July 2015 after experimenting with an art style. Bit City was released for Android and iOS on March 13, 2017, following a month-long early access period on Google Play. In April 2017, it had received 2.5 million downloads, and moon cities were added on April 13.

== Reception ==
Reception

Review scores
Publication	Score
Gamezebo	90/100
Pocket Gamer	3/5
148Apps	3/5

The overall gameplay was considered charming but repetitive. Gamezebo's Nik Ives-Allison called it the "best hybrid clicker-simulation game" at the time and stated it was addictive and easy for the player to learn. Campbell Bird of 148Apps criticized Bit City for providing "very little satisfaction", and Pocket Gamer's Jessica Famularo criticized the "shallow" goals and stated there was no motivation to continue after the player had reached the last city. Reviewers from Pocket Gamer thought the core gameplay loop was engaging and addictive, while others found it boring.

Bit City's graphics were liked by critics. While some reviewers commended the variety of buildings, Bird praised Bit City's landscape design, but Ives-Allison criticized that the lack of a rotative camera made it challenging to view vehicles. Critics received its soundtrack positively for its upbeat nature.
