= Xceed =

Xceed may refer to:

- Xceed (software company), provider of software components and tools for the Microsoft .NET platform
- XCEED, Indian robotics challenge held as a prelude to the Kurukshetra festival
- Xceed (professional wrestling), professional wrestling stable

== See also ==
- EXceed
- Exceed (disambiguation)
- Exceeder
- Xceedium
- Xseed
