= Golfinity =

2014 video game

- App icon
- Developer: NimbleBit
- Publisher: NimbleBit
- Platform: iOS
- Release: November 13, 2014
- Genre: Sports
- Mode: Single-player

Golfinity is a 2014 golf game developed and published by the American indie studio NimbleBit. In Golfinity, the player must aim a golf ball into a hole in each procedurally generated golf course with as few shots as possible. Golfinity was released for iOS devices on November 13, 2014.

== Gameplay ==
Similar to the actual rules of golf, the player must hit a golf ball into a hole in the fewest number of attempts possible. In Golfinity, each golf course is procedurally generated, and the golf ball is controlled through a drag-and-release mechanic that can affect its velocity or trajectory.

== Release ==
Golfinity was developed and published by NimbleBit, an American indie studio who previously released Tiny Tower (2011) and Pocket Planes (2012). Golfinity was released for iOS devices on November 13, 2014, after its announcement a month prior.

== Reception ==
Reception

Aggregate score
Aggregator	Score
Metacritic	75/100

Review scores
Publication	Score
Gamezebo	70/100
Pocket Gamer	2.5/5
148Apps	4.5/5

On Metacritic, Golfinity has a "generally favorable" score of 75/100 based on four reviewers.

Critics gave mixed reviews on the gameplay of Golfinity, comparing it to Desert Golfing, another golf video game. Writing gameplay as a "slightly pointless grind," Harry Slater of Pocket Gamer described issues with the fixed in-game camera and level design.
