= Disco Zoo =

2014 video game

- App icon
- Developer: Milkbag Games
- Publisher: NimbleBit
- Platforms: iOS, Android
- Release: WW: February 21, 2014
- Genre: Simulation
- Mode: Single-player

Disco Zoo is a zoo simulation video game developed by Milkbag Games and published by NimbleBit for iOS and Android. It was released on the App Store on February 21, 2014, for iOS.

== Gameplay ==
In-game screenshot showing the start screen of Disco Zoo.

Using pixelated graphics seen in other NimbleBit games such as Pocket Trains and Pocket Planes, the game puts the player in charge of a virtual zoo. The user starts with a small collection of farm animals, and must rescue more animals to expand the zoo. New exhibits are constructed when a player rescues an animal for the first time; thereafter, additional instances of that animal will be added to the same exhibit.

The game contains 14 different regions: Farm, Outback, Savanna, Northern, Polar, Jungle, Jurassic, Ice Age, City, Mountain, Nocturnal, Moon, Mars, and Constellation. Each region has 7 different animals that can be collected. 3 of these will be "Common", 2 will be "Rare", and one will be "Mythical". The last one is "Timeless" and the Timeless animal for a region is unlocked after a certain amount of resets of the game. Most animals, excluding Moon animals, Mars animals, and Mythical animals, are real-life animals. Most "Mythical" animals are taken from common stories or myths, such as the Yeti being the Polar Mythical animal, or Sasquatch as the Northern Mythical creature.

Animals are rescued as part of a mini-game. The user must select a region to rescue from, then press "Start Rescue". A blank 5x5 grid will appear. At the top, the animals which can be rescued will appear. Different animals have different patterns of grid tiles; revealing all the tiles occupied by an animal rescues that animal. Players are given a limited number of tile flips for each grid, so care must be taken to avoid unnecessarily turning over tiles. The tiles the player chose not to flip are revealed at the end of the mini-game.

Animals each have unique pens, and each pen can hold up to 25 of a single creature. After this, rescued animals of that type must be released for money, as the maximum amount of that creature is already in the zoo exhibit. Upon release of an animal, the player is rewarded with coins, the game's primary currency. Statues can be earned when specified amounts of each animal are released.

After maxing out 15 pens, the three space regions of Moon, Mars, and Constellation are unlocked. When rescuing an animal of which the player already has 25 specimens in their zoo, they will also be given the option to prepare it for space instead of releasing it. This stores the animal in the Space Pen where a maximum of 10 animals of each species can be held. Those animals are used to fulfill Space Requests, each requiring certain animals of a region in certain quantities and rewarding the player with Space Coins, an alternative currency of the game and the only way to rescue animals from the space regions.

Players can use the game's other currency, "DiscoBux", to hold a disco party in the zoo at any time, which keeps animals awake and doubles the amount of coins received from exhibits; additionally, a disco ball appears at the top of the screen, disco music plays, and both zoo patrons and animals dance for the duration of the party. When a disco is not in progress, animals are subject to falling asleep after a specified time, after which they will not earn coins until the user wakes them up. Short discos will happen for free if a trophy is earned from releasing set numbers of animals. Players can choose to hold parties for one minute, one hour, or eight hours, depending on the amount of DiscoBux they choose to spend.

After obtaining at least 10 copies of each animal of at least 10 regions, the player will be offered the option to reset the game and start over, losing all coins, animals and statues but keeping any DiscoBux, Space Coins, and decorative items. This opens up unlocking of Timeless animals. One new Timeless animal is unlocked after each game reset, requiring 14 game resets to unlock them all.

== Reception ==
Disco Zoo

Aggregate score
Aggregator	Score
Metacritic	70/100

Review scores
Publication	Score
TouchArcade	4/5
PC Magazine	4/5
Pocket Gamer	3/5
USgamer	1.5/5
148Apps	4/5

Disco Zoo has been received fairly well by critics, who described the game as fitting in well with previous "fun Nimblebit-style titles", but some reviewers expressed concerns about players eventually becoming uninterested in continuing to play the game. Metacritic gave an aggregated score of 70/100 based on 9 critics, indicating "mixed or average reviews". TouchArcade rated it 4 out of 5 stars, noting it "perfectly fits on the App Store shelves next to Tiny Tower, Nimble Quest and their other titles". PC Magazine also rated it 4 out of 5, saying the game has "a quirky theme, lots of gameplay, and a heaping of adorableness". 148Apps' 4 star rating described it as "a nice and charming game", but was concerned "that feeling that it's possible to just quit at any time does ultimately drag it down." Pocket Gamer gave it 3 stars, calling it an "artfully constructed free-to-play time [...] spinner." However, USgamer only rated it 1.5/5, with its overall conclusion being "a polished title with a couple of nice ideas completely undermined by boring mechanics and obtrusive, game-breaking monetization."
