= Dizzypad =

2008 video game

Dizzypad was a mobile game developed by NimbleBit. It became the #1 free iPad game in nine countries following the launch of its HD version.

== See also ==
- Pocket Frogs
