= Big Bang Mini =

2009 video game

- Developer: Arkedo Studio
- Publisher: SouthPeak Games
- Designer: Camille Guermonprez
- Platform: Nintendo DS
- Release: NA: January 21, 2009; EU: March 6, 2009
- Genre: Shoot 'em up
- Modes: Single-player, multiplayer

Big Bang Mini is a Nintendo DS game that was released on January 21, 2009, in North America and March 6, 2009, in Europe. It was developed by Arkedo Studio, known for their previous DS game Nervous Brickdown, and published by SouthPeak Games.

== Gameplay ==
Example of the art style in a level of Big Bang Mini (as of March, 2008)

The primary gameplay mechanic of Big Bang Mini involves the player using the stylus to shoot fireworks from the bottom screen to enemies in the top screen. While you are shooting fireworks, debris and sparks rain down from the top screen onto your character on the bottom screen, and you must again use the stylus to dodge the falling hazards. Big Bang Mini has four gameplay modes, multiplayer functionality, and over 100 levels of gameplay. Upon completing a level you will be rewarded by designing a Final Bouquet.

== Development ==
The game's soundtrack is all original music. The settings range from a pixelated landscape of pyramids and trees and a few different types of city settings. Enemies include superheroes, clowns, pixelated birds, Chinese dragons, and sharks that shoot lasers.

== Reception ==
Reception

Aggregate score
Aggregator	Score
Metacritic	78/100

Review scores
Publication	Score
Destructoid	8.5/10
Edge	6/10
Eurogamer	5/10
Game Informer	7.75/10
GamePro	4/5
GameRevolution	B+
GameSpot	9/10
GameZone	8.9/10
IGN	8.7/10
Nintendo Power	8.5/10
411Mania	9.4/10

Big Bang Mini received "generally favorable reviews" according to the review aggregation website Metacritic. GameSpot writer Chris Watters gave high praise to the addictive gameplay design and "innovative control scheme", along with "wonderfully vibrant visuals and an infectious soundtrack" to raise the replay value for "newcomers and veterans alike", calling it "an evolutionary step forward for the genre." Daemon Hatfield of IGN praised Arkedo Studios for creating a "psychedelic shooter with fantastic visuals and simple, solid gameplay", concluding that "If you're a fan of hyper shooters like Space Invaders Extreme, you'll definitely want to consider the Big Bang theory. It's got personality and style to spare." Matt Helgeson from Game Informer said, "While it works great for the most part, the more elaborate levels begin to overwhelm the imprecise mechanics, causing confusion and frustration. Still, it's damn fun."
