= Arkedo Studio =

French video game developer (2006–2013)

- Type: Private
- Industry: Video games
- Founded: 2006
- Founder: Camille Guermonprez; Aurélien Régard
- Defunct: 2013
- Headquarters: Paris, France
- Website: www.arkedo.com

Arkedo Studio was a French independent video game developer, founded in 2006 by Camille Guermonprez and Aurélien Régard. The company released their first game, Nervous Brickdown for the Nintendo DS, in 2007. They followed that game with 2009's Big Bang Mini—also for DS, and then later OMG: Our Manic Game for Windows Phone 7. The company's founding goal was to be "as small as possible", while still creating "'real' games – in boxes, with a manual". The company's owners have sought to retain the rights to their intellectual properties; as of January 2010, they continue to hold them all. On February 23, 2013, it was announced that the studio was shutting down.

== Games developed ==
Game title	Year released	Platform(s)	Notes
Nervous Brickdown	2007	Nintendo DS	The developer's first project. Published by Eidos in North America and Europe. Success published the Japanese version.
Big Bang Mini	2009	Nintendo DS	Published by SouthPeak Games.
Arkedo Series - 01 JUMP!	2009	Xbox Live Indie Games, PlayStation Network	The first game in the Arkedo series.
Arkedo Series - 02 SWAP!	2009	Xbox Live Indie Games, PlayStation Network	The second game in the Arkedo series.
Arkedo Series - 03 PIXEL!	2009	Xbox Live Indie Games, PlayStation Network	The third and final game in the Arkedo series.
OMG: Our Manic Game	2010	Windows Phone	
Hell Yeah! Wrath of the Dead Rabbit	2012	Steam, Xbox Live Arcade, PlayStation Network	Published by Sega.
Poöf vs. the Cursed Kitty	2013	Steam, Windows	Published by Neko Entertainment.
