= Pocket Frogs =

2010 life simulation video game

- The game logo since version 2.0
- Developer: NimbleBit
- Publisher: NimbleBit
- Platforms: iOS, Android
- Release: September 15, 2010
- Genre: Simulation
- Modes: Multiplayer video game, Single-player video game

Pocket Frogs is a life simulation video game developed and published by NimbleBit for the iOS App Store and Google Play Store. It was released as a free game with additional in-app purchases. The aim is to complete the 'Froggydex' by earning money to breed and sell virtual frogs. The latest version of the app is version 3.12.2, released in January 2026.

== Gameplay ==
An example view of a habitat.

When the game begins, the player owns two frogs, a Cocos Bruna Anura and a Green Folium Anura, one regular habitat, a nursery habitat, and 1000 coins. In the pond view, players control their frog, eating flies to tame it, which makes it happy, breeding with other frogs, and finding presents. Presents include various breeds of frogs, potions (for quick frog growths and races), stamps (for quick delivery of mailbox items) and coins (which are used to order frogs in the Froggydex or FrogMart, and to order scenery or habitat backgrounds from the Supply Shop). The potions and stamp count are located in upper left corner of the screen, the Experience Points (XP) count is located in the upper right corner of the screen, the coin count is located at the lower left corner of the screen, and the back/menu button is located at the lower right corner of the screen.

Pocket Frogs shop, known as the "FrogMart". In addition to breeding, the player can buy different species of frog.

Besides taming the frog, eating flies increases their happiness and, if they are not yet mature, can lessen the time left to maturation. The size of the flies vary and the bigger the fly the happier the frog. The biggest of the flies also add to the player's current experience points. The player receives approximately 10% of the frog's value in XP when they are tamed and it takes 3x the rarity of the frog in flies to tame them. Frogs can also be gifted via Game Center. The game is set in real time, which means that it may take up to 2 days for a frog to hatch and grow into an adult. The player levels up by earning a set amount of XP which increases with every level. To level up the player needs to get the required number of XP located in the top right corner during game play, to automatically level up to the next level.

Every week a new combination of frogs is published as the Weekly Set. The player collects all the frogs in the set to receive a reward of potions and stamps. Players can choose to complete any of the available weekly sets in any order.

=== Species ===
Species of frogs are sorted by name from their base color (for example: Blue), then their secondary color (for example: Cafea - meaning coffee-bean-colored), and then the pattern name. For example, a Green Folium Anura is a mainly green frog with green cheek blushes in the secondary color; a Blue Aurum Zebrae is a mainly blue frog with a yellow zebra pattern in the secondary color; and a Cocos Tingo Symphonia is a mainly brown frog with a red music note on its back in the secondary color. There are 23 primary and 16 secondary colors.

Level 1-4 frogs are labeled "common", level 5-8 frogs are labeled "rare", level 9-12 frogs are labeled "endangered", and level 13+ frogs are labeled "legendary". Frogs unlock slowly as the player levels up, and can be obtained in numerous ways. Frogs leveled 1-8 can be bought daily from the FrogMart with coins. Frogs leveled 9 and up can be bought from the FrogMart with potions when available, gifted, or found at the Pond.

== History ==
In Version 1.2, on July 12, 2011, new species Bulbus, Trivium, Geminus, Orbis, Signum, Gyrus, Vinaceus, Persona, Bulla, and Obaro were added into the Froggydex.

Until Version 2.0, on 1 November 2012, there were only frog species up to Level 16. Plus+ Network was removed in the same update. The only way to trade frogs from then on was to use Game Center.

On September 24, 2015, the Android version of Pocket Frogs, which was ported by Mobage, was removed, because Mobage had removed their game servers. Other games, like Pocket Planes and Tiny Tower, were affected by this switch. There are no plans for porting it from Apple Store and re-releasing it and the data from Android cannot be transferred to iOS. NimbleBit announced that future sequels or major update may include re-releasing the game into Android.

On September 6, 2017, a beta version of Pocket Frogs for Android was released onto the Play Store by NimbleBit. Data from the mobage version is not recoverable.

On September 24, 2017, NimbleBit released Pocket Frogs version 3.0.3, adding capability for iOS 11, but removing most features, including Catalog, racing, and mini games. In addition, Glass and Chroma frogs became difficult for players to obtain. NimbleBit stated they may add some or all features back in future updates, but didn't have plans to do so at that time.

On February 7, 2020, NimbleBit released update 3.1.1. The update added several new habitat backgrounds and decorations, new breeds of frogs, and brought back racing and most of the features removed in update 3.0.3. Weekly Sets can now be selected to complete in any order, not just the most recently available set. Frog Requests and the Catalog, however, are still not part of the current game.

== See also ==
- Pocket Planes
- Pocket Trains

== Other links ==
- NimbleBit website
