= NimbleBit =

American mobile game developer and publisher

NimbleBit, LLC
- Type: Private
- Industry: Video games
- Founded: 2002; 24 years ago
- Founders: Ian Marsh; David Marsh
- Headquarters: Poway, California, US
- Area served: Worldwide
- Key people: Ian Marsh (CEO)
- Number of employees: 3
- Website: http://www.nimblebit.com/

NimbleBit, LLC is an American developer and publisher of iOS and Android mobile apps. It was co-founded by brothers David and Ian Marsh. Their titles include Pocket Frogs, Tiny Tower, Pocket Planes and Disco Zoo.

== Games ==
- Hanoi (2008)
- Threads (2008)
- Scoops (2008)
- Textropolis (2009)
- Bluebird (2009)
- Kyper (2009)
- Moon Drop (2009)
- Sky Burger (2009)
- Fishtropolis — Word Fun for Everyone (2009)
- Dizzypad (2010)
- Mega Panda (2010)
- Omium - 2 Player Shooter (2010)
- Zero Gear (2010)
- Pocket Frogs (2010)
- Tiny Tower (2011)
- Pocket Planes (2012)
- Nimble Quest (2013)
- Pocket Trains (2013)
- Star Wars: Tiny Death Star (2013-2014)
- Tiny Tower Vegas (2014)
- Disco Zoo (2014)
- Golfinity (2014)
- Letterpad (2015)
- Capitals (2015)
- Bit City (2017)
- Words Royale (2018)
- Lego Tower (2019)
- Pocket Trucks (2023)
- Pocket Pilots (2026)

=== Notable games ===
==== Tiny Tower ====
Tiny Tower is a business simulation video game developed by NimbleBit for iOS and Android devices. In Tiny Tower, the player manages an expanding tower filled with virtual people, who are referred to as "Bitizens". The tower has multiple types of floors, all of which are randomly generated. The game is customizable, allowing the player to customize their Bitizens, repaint new floors, or even evict Bitizens. The goal of the game is to build the tallest of towers, which will attract Bitizens to move in and work in any floor the player designates. On February 7, 2012, Tiny Tower reached 10 million downloads, so Nimblebit gave all Tiny Tower users 10 free "tower bux". The game received a positive reception, reaching a score of 82/100 on Metacritic, with no negative reviews. In the App Store, Tiny Tower reached 4.5 / 5 stars, based on more than 155 thousand user reviews. The game has many aspects, such as active and passive playing and pixel art graphics, making the game successful with recognition that includes iPhone Game of the Week, and was elected by Apple as The Game of the Year for iPhone in 2011. Tiny Tower released on June 23, 2011, for iOS devices and on November 16, 2011, for Android devices.

Founder Ian Marsh has accused Zynga of plagiarising NimbleBit's Tiny Tower to create Dream Heights. Zynga had attempted to buy NimbleBit, but on refusal, Zynga created Dream Heights. NimbleBit then added a mission in Tiny Tower titled "Beware of dog", a reference to Zynga's logo, with the caption stating "After failing to buy your tower, a rival developer would like:"; several materials are listed, with which they want to build their own tower.

==== Pocket Frogs ====
The aim is to earn money by breeding and selling one's own frogs. It has Game Center support. When the game begins, the player owns two frogs, a Cocos Bruna Anura and a Green Folium Anura, one regular habitat, a nursery habitat, and 1000 coins. In the pond view, players control their frog, eating flies to tame it, which makes it happy, breeding with other frogs players find, and finding presents. Presents include various breeds of frogs, potions (for quick frog growths and races), stamps (for quick delivery of mailbox items) and coins. Besides taming the frog, eating flies increases their happiness and, if they are not yet mature, can lessen the time left to maturation. The goal is to collect all 41,216 frogs available in-game. It was released on September 15, 2010, for iOS devices. The Android version (distributed by Mobage) was removed from the Google Play Store, but was re-released by NimbleBit with the removal of several features.

==== Pocket Planes ====
In this game, the player is in charge of an airline company. Similarly, they must purchase or construct airports, planes, and parts. The main gameplay is flying passengers and shipping cargo from one city to another. There are a total of 250 airports in the game, each based on real world locations. There are 60 different planes that carry passengers, cargo, or a combination of both passengers and cargo. The game bears several similarities to Tiny Tower in the use of its pixel world and "Bitizens". This game was released June 14, 2012 for iOS devices. Later the same year ported to Android by Mobage, who then dropped the app in late 2015. The game is no longer available for Android devices, and Nimblebit has stated there will be no attempts by them to change that. In March 2022, NimbleBit released a new port of Pocket Planes for Android, available on the Google Play store.

==== Pocket Trains ====
Pocket Trains is a business simulation video game developed by NimbleBit for iOS and Android. It was developed before Pocket Planes and published on the App Store on September 15, 2013 for iOS. In this game, the player is in charge of a railway company. Like Pocket Planes, the player must buy train stations and railway tracks. The main part of the game is transporting cargo and passengers around a simple map from one city to another. There are 27 trains which are unlocked in crates.
