= Sky Burger =

2009 video game

- App icon
- Developer: NimbleBit
- Publisher: NimbleBit
- Platforms: iOS, Android
- Release: iOS: May 21, 2009; Android: November 8, 2012
- Genre: Action
- Mode: Single-player

Sky Burger is a 2009 action game developed and published by the American indie studio NimbleBit. In it, the player must catch burger ingredients to fulfill specific orders. Sky Burger was released on May 21, 2009, for iOS devices, followed by a port for Android devices on November 8, 2012. There is now an updated version of the app available. Sky Burger was met with mixed reviews.

== Gameplay ==
In Sky Burger, the player must stack ingredients falling from the sky in a specific order.

In Sky Burger, players stack ingredients to fill a specific order. The player must catch ingredients—a patty, cheese, lettuce, pickle, onion, and tomato—from the sky by tilting their device's accelerometer to catch them. Once the order is filled, the player gets money and a tip and then continues making more burgers. The tip is based upon the cost of the burger and how well the player did catching the ingredients and avoiding the unwanted ingredients.

The order of ingredients are randomly selected, and one burger called the Sky Burger allows the player to stack as many ingredients as possible while avoiding the falling hamburger buns.

The difficulty increases as the player successfully makes consecutive orders. Ingredients, as well as the hamburger buns, fall quickly. The required amount of ingredients is higher. However, if a player fails to complete an unfinished order due to accidentally collecting a hamburger bun when they have not collected all of the ingredients needed to make that order, the difficulty is set back to the beginning, and again becomes harder as the player progresses.

== Release ==
Sky Burger was released for iOS devices on May 21, 2009. In August 2012, an update adding Game Center achievements, leaderboards, and retina display support was implemented. A version released for Android devices was released on November 8, 2012, and in January 2016, a revamped edition of the original Sky Burger, with a customizable character system, new burgers, and ingredients, debuted.

== Reception ==
Reception

Aggregate score
Aggregator	Score
GameRankings	65.00%

Review score
Publication	Score
VideoGamer.com	8/10

On GameRankings, Sky Burger is ranked with a 65% approval rating.

Chris Barylick of Macworld mentioned that the game "makes great use of tilt controls for the iPhone and iPod touch," but "the game can feel a bit directionless, which both works for and against it." The game was praised.

== See also ==
- Scoops – another NimbleBit game with similar gameplay
