= Lego Tower =

2019 video game

- App icon
- Developer: NimbleBit
- Publisher: NimbleBit
- Platforms: iOS, Android
- Release: iOS: July 1, 2019; Android: July 2, 2019
- Genres: Simulation, incremental
- Mode: Single-player

Lego Tower is a 2019 incremental business simulation game created by NimbleBit in collaboration with The Lego Group. It is based on the 2011 mobile game Tiny Tower, in which the player must generate money from operating a building with multiple floors. Lego Tower was first announced in March 2019 and was released on July 1, 2019, for iOS, followed by Android on July 2. Lego Tower was met with criticism for its repetitive gameplay.

== Gameplay ==
Lego Tower is a Lego-themed version of Tiny Tower and shares multiple gameplay aspects with its predecessor. In it, the player views the cross section of a building with multiple floors. Each floor can be designated as a business or residential floor. Business floors can earn money, which bring in residents (represented with minifigures) and be spent for building more floors. Different Lego sets serve as buildings, with content from different themes.

Occasionally, the player may embark on side quests to earn an in-game currency called Bux, or they can purchase it by spending real-world money. Bux is used for lowering construction time or activating a subscription service called Tower Club that offers gameplay benefits.

== Release ==
NimbleBit first announced Lego Tower in March 2019, and it became open for pre-registration on the Google Play Store in June 2019. Lego Tower was released for iOS devices on July 1, 2019, followed by an Android version the next day.

== Reception ==
Reception

Review scores
Publication	Score
Gamezebo	80/100
Multiplayer.it	7.0/10

On Common Sense Media, Lego Tower is rated ages 11+, and the site's consensus reads: "Reach new heights in fun but highly repetitive sim."

Most reviewers found the game repetitive. Lego Tower was featured in TouchArcade's list of best mobile games of 2019.

== See also ==
- List of Lego video games
