= I Get This Call Every Day =

2012 video game

- Developer: David S Gallant
- Designer: David S Gallant
- Programmer: David S Gallant
- Artist: David S Gallant
- Composer: Pete Mascio
- Engine: Flixel
- Platforms: Microsoft Windows, OS X
- Release: December 21, 2012
- Genre: Point-and-click
- Mode: Single-player

I Get This Call Every Day is a 2012 point-and-click video game developed and published by Toronto-based developer David S Gallant. It was released for Microsoft Windows and OS X on December 21, 2012. It focuses on a call received by an employee of a customer service call centre; the player must navigate through the call without irritating the caller or breaking confidentiality laws. Gallant was fired from his job at a call centre as a direct result of publishing the game.

== Gameplay ==
I Get This Call Every Day makes use of a simplistic art style and uses only one viewpoint throughout the game

In I Get This Call Every Day, players take the role of David, a call centre employee sitting at his desk. He answers a call from "Billy Swarth", a taxpayer who wants to change his address in the system. The caller is snippy and dense, and will answer security questions only partially. The player can select from a menu of responses to guide Swarth through the security process.

The game features one route in which the player manages to keep their job. In all other routes the player will be fired, either by breaching client confidentiality by allowing Swarth's half-answers through, or by annoying Swarth enough to have him ask for their manager. An average play through of the game lasts a few minutes.

== Background and development ==
Gallant had some experience with the process of flash game development, having developed various short games in his spare time. He began developing these games around 2011, and regularly attended meetups in his home town of Toronto.

Gallant developed I Get This Call Every Day during his part-time employment as a call centre employee at the Canada Revenue Agency (CRA) in Toronto, Ontario. While attending TOJam, a game jam, in 2012, Gallant got into a conversation about non-games, from which the concept was born.

The art for the game was created entirely with open-source graphics program GIMP, and the majority of the script was written during his commutes to and from work. The two primary characters in the game, who share 250 lines of dialogue, are both voiced by Gallant.

The game was developed in the open-source software package Flixel.

== Release and reception ==
I Get This Call Every Day was self-released on Gallant's personal website on December 21, 2012, as a pay what you want title with a $2 minimum. He sent emails to various gaming websites and blogs for publicity, some of which were successful.

Gallant worked to get the game through Steam's "greenlight" process, but withdrew the game in May 2013. In a blog post written for Gamasutra, he said this was partially in protest at Paranautical Activity's high-profile rejection by Valve, but also because of the "negativity" he felt during the process. However, he later decided to relist the game in the system, and it was eventually approved on April 7, 2014.

Critics praised the concept, but noted the game was not designed to be "fun". Kotaku's Patricia Hernandez wrote that "It embodies the type of shift that I'd like the game industry at large to see... I'd rather play a game like this—admittedly not fun, and even kind of ugly-looking—than play most triple-A games out there."

A Polygon feature in March 2014 estimated that Gallant had earned around $10,000 from sales of the game since its release.

=== Firing from the CRA ===
Shortly after the game's release, it picked up press traction in Gallant's hometown of Toronto. A January 29, 2013 front-page feature in the Toronto Star explicitly made the link between Gallant's part-time job with the Canada Revenue Agency and the narrative of the game, which has no obvious ties to any government agency. The CRA's communications director, Clarke Olsen, told the Star that National Revenue Minister, Gail Shea, "considers this type of conduct offensive and completely unacceptable".

Gallant was fired from this role at the CRA following the Star's story. Jim McGinley, organizer of TOJam, kept a blog of Gallant's treatment following the publication of I Get This Call Every Day, arguing he was punished for his choice of medium: "If David had written a short story, directed a movie, or did some stand-up inspired by his boring job he'd still be employed. In fact, he'd be celebrated." Speaking to Polygon, he argued that Shea's outrage indicated she had not personally experienced the game, and Mathew Kumar of Torontoist wrote that "Playing the game itself makes it clear that it was no attempt to get fired".

Following press around Gallant's firing, sales of the game increased. Popular Let's Play channels on YouTube, such as The Yogscast, released videos based on the game.
