= Exceed =

Exceed may refer to:

- Exceed, enterprise software produced by Hummingbird Ltd.
- eXceed, a video game series by Nyu Media
- Exceed, a fictional race of anthropomorphic winged cats in the manga and anime series Fairy Tail
- Exceed, a brand of sports drink

See also

- Exeed
