= Star Wars: Tiny Death Star =

2013 video game

- Developers: Disney Mobile; NimbleBit
- Publisher: Disney Mobile
- Series: Tiny Tower
- Platforms: Android, iOS, Windows Phone, Microsoft Windows, Windows RT
- Release: AU: October 12, 2013 (Android); AU: October 15, 2013 (iOS); WW: November 7, 2013
- Genre: Business simulation
- Mode: Single-player

Star Wars: Tiny Death Star is a 2013 business simulation video game developed by Disney Mobile and NimbleBit, and published by Disney Mobile for Android, iOS, Windows Phone, and Windows 8/RT devices. It was based on NimbleBit's previous game, Tiny Tower, and was set in the Star Wars universe.

Star Wars: Tiny Death Star was announced by Disney Interactive Studios on October 4, 2013. It was released in Australia and New Zealand for Android devices on October 12, 2013 and in Australia for iOS devices on October 15, 2013. It was released worldwide on November 7, 2013, for Android, iOS, Windows Phone, Windows 8 and Windows RT devices.

The game was removed from the App Store and Google Play Store by Disney in October 2014. It is currently only available on Amazon's Kids+ service.

== Gameplay ==
The goal is to build and expand a Death Star, while attracting virtual people known as galactic Bitizens to build and run virtual businesses within the Death Star.

=== Bitizens ===
The lowest floor of the tower, a lobby, has an elevator where bitizens can randomly appear. They will have a speech bubble above their head, with a number denoting which floor they would like to be taken to. If they are taken to a residential floor which has not been fully occupied, they will automatically inhabit that floor and become a resident of the tower. Each bitizen has a skill level out of 9 for each category of commercial floor, showing how good they are at each type of trade. This encourages the user to tailor each bitizen to a floor they are most suited to. Each bitizen has a dream job, and the player is rewarded "Imperial Bux" for placing them in that job. Occasionally, the player may be tasked to complete a mission, like search for a specific object or Bitizen. Every time a player accomplishes these tasks by tapping on the floor that the bitizen whom the player was looking for was on, they are rewarded "Imperial Bux".

=== Currency ===
In the game, there are two types of currency: Imperial Credits and Imperial Bux. Credits are used for the majority of purchases, often the most simple. Bux are used for special functions, such as speeding up processes which would otherwise involve a waiting period. Bux are not as common as credits are, and only appear randomly through active game play or through in-app purchases. Credits, on the other hand, are earned regardless of whether the player is playing or not.

=== Unlockables ===
While playing Tiny Death Star, Bitizens, Levels, and Scenes were unlocked in the album. Throughout gameplay, new species of bitzens are unlocked as they appear in the elevator or are found throughout the Death Star.

Scenes were unlocked when the elevator was used to take a specific individual (or sometimes member of a species) to a specific level.

=== Floors ===
The Death Star grows by constructing floors, which can be either residential or commercial. Residential floors house bitizens. Bitizens can be assigned to jobs on commercial floors. Commercial floors sell products, which are automatically sold, even while the player is away. There are 5 types of commercial floors: Food, Retail, Service, Recreational, and Imperial.

Up to three products may be sold at a single floor, one per employed bitizen. All these products follow the theme of the business. With every floor, construction time is parallel to real world-time; construction time will increase as the tower gets taller. However, special VIPs can be used to speed this time up, or the player can speed it up with "Imperial Bux".

=== VIPs ===
Apart from standard Bitizens, there are also VIPs who randomly appear in the elevator. Up to 5 VIPs can be stored in the lobby at any one time, and they can be kept for any period of time. VIPs are used to improve the Death Star. They helped attract customers to the player's levels, complete tasks faster, move levels, upgrade levels, or fill an entire vacant residential floor with tenants.

== Reception ==
Reception

Aggregate score
| Aggregator | Score |
|---|---|
| Metacritic | 70/100 |

Review scores
| Publication | Score |
|---|---|
| Edge | 3/10 |
| Gamezebo | 4/5 |
| MacLife | 4/5 |
| Pocket Gamer | 4/5 |
| TouchArcade | 4/5 |
| Digital Spy | 3/5 |
| Metro | 3/10 |

At the time of the game's release, the iOS version received "mixed or average reviews" according to the review aggregation website Metacritic.

== Discontinuation ==
In October 2014, Disney pulled the app from the App Store and Google Play. Co-developer NimbleBit was not given notice prior to the removal. As of December 11, 2015, it is unavailable on both the Windows Store and the App Store. Disney removed the game from all app stores because they wanted to take the Star Wars games in another direction. The developer, NimbleBit, was disappointed by the removal of the game because it was a high source of revenue. The game is still available to play on the Amazon FreeTime Unlimited service.

== See also ==
- NimbleBit LLC
- Tiny Tower
- SimTower
