= Cherry Tree High Comedy Club =

2010 adventure video game

- Developer: 773
- Publisher: Capcom
- Engine: RPG Maker XP
- Platform: Microsoft Windows
- Release: JP: June 20, 2010; WW: April 27, 2012
- Genre: Adventure game
- Mode: Single-player

Cherry Tree High Comedy Club, known in Japan as Manken! (まんけん!) is an adventure game developed by 773 and published by Capcom. The game follows 17-year-old Mairu Hibisu as she recruits fellow students for her comedy club. The player controls Mairu as she meets new people, tries to finish her homework each day, and levels up her conversation topics. The game was first released in Japan in June 2010, with an English translation released by Nyu Media in April 2012. Two sequels were later released.

== Gameplay ==
The player takes control of Mairu Hibisu, a third-year student at the fictional Cherry Tree High, described as "a lively young girl who just wants to see people happy". At the start of the game, the player is tasked with recruiting at least three more students to Mairu's comedy club by April 30, or else it will be disbanded. The gameplay is similar to that of a dating sim, though the focus is on platonic relationships, and there are no romantic options of any kind. The majority of the game is based on dialogue between characters, and features little action compared to other adventure games.

During the game, the player must develop relationships with each of the six potential recruits, and advance Mairu's standing with them to get at least three of them to join her comedy club. In order to do so, the player has to talk with the recruits to feel closer to them, with their current relationship level marked from zero to five. The player's options for doing so include talking with them on the telephone, making idle chit-chat, or talking with them in person about topics of interests. When the recruit's relationship level increases to five, they will agree to join her comedy club.

The player can level up Mairu's skills through means like watching television, reading magazines, or going to public exhibitions. These skills, out of twelve topics that include politics, romance, pets, and sports, can be used to chat with potential recruits in-person, gaining more standing with them based on Mairu's skills and whether the conversation partner likes or dislikes the topic.

The player can also earn and spend money during the course of the game, being earned by working part-time jobs such as cleaning and jewelry-making, and being spent on things such as skill training and fatigue-reducing items. The player starts the game with 3000 Yen, and is not required to keep a certain balance.

The days are divided into "Morning", "Afternoon", and "Evening", and each task, with some exceptions, will cause time to pass linearly from one section to the next. Mairu is confined to certain areas depending on the time of day; at school in the mornings, except for on days off, she is allowed to roam Cherry Tree Town during the afternoons, and is stuck in her dormitory in the evenings. Certain activities are exclusive to each location - for instance, Mairu can only watch television in the evenings.

If the player fails to recruit at least three prospective members by April 30, the player fails the game, and is sent back to the title screen after a cutscene. The player cannot continue from this point, and must reload a save file or start a new game.

== Release ==
The Japanese-language version of the game, Manken, was released on June 20, 2010. The English-language version of the game was released on April 27, 2012, with a version for Steam released on November 8 the same year. A second English version was released on November 20, 2014, which restores some of the original Japanese text. In June 2022, Western publisher Nyu Media went out of business and, as a result, Cherry Tree High Comedy Club and its sequel were no longer available for sale following the end of the Steam Summer Sale, during which the game was discounted before its eventual delisting on July 7.

=== Localization ===
The translation of the game was directly influenced by the Ace Attorney series, which the translators considered "widely perceived as the 'best in class' game localization". This influence led to character names being Westernized, and the setting changed from 'town somewhere in Japan' to 'town somewhere in the USA'", explaining that the Ace Attorney series followed a similar style.

Although the developers had faith in their prior translation experience, they cited both schedule concerns and their small team as issues. These concerns caused them to engage the "very capable" Tezuka Productions for help, dividing the over 4,500 lines between Nyu Media and the latter, who then looked over all of the finished dialogue.

The translators wanted to be consistent with the Japanese version, "in meaning, and especially the tone", citing its importance to the game's story. There were no changes to the plot, the characterisation was preserved for the English version, and the graphics had only minor changes to shop signs and the History skill icon, being changed from a spinning top to a scroll, as the spinning top wouldn't be understood overseas.

The humour was changed only when it would not be understood by Western audiences, including cultural references exclusive to Japan, though retained references that they felt would be recognised by most Western players, such as from Phoenix Wright: Ace Attorney, Street Fighter, and Death Note. In cases where they changed the dialogue, they replaced it with Western pop culture references, such as Star Wars and Monty Python, making sure that they weren't "obnoxious or indulgent".

All of the character names were changed from their original Japanese, in keeping with the Ace Attorney translation style, to names that English-speaking audiences would understand better. The names were designed to be expressive of a character's personality, and so the translators kept this design in the English translation, for instance, changing "Karasuyama Chitose" from a well-to-do name to "Octavia Richmond", a pun on the character's wealth.

In order to preserve continuity between Cherry Tree High Comedy Club and its sequel, Cherry Tree High I! My! Girls!, Nyu Media released a new version of Cherry Tree High Comedy Club which reinstates many of the themes from the original Japanese version, such as character and place names, as well as setting the game explicitly in Japan, as opposed to the United States. As a result, the Japanese setting continues into Cherry Tree High I! My! Girls, and is declared the "official version" of the translation by Nyu Media.

== Release history ==
Title	Japanese release date	English release date
Cherry Tree High Comedy Club	June 21, 2010	April 27, 2012
Cherry Tree High I! My! Girls!	December 31, 2010	November 20, 2014
Cherry Tree High Girls' Fight		June 13, 2016
