= Hell Yeah! Wrath of the Dead Rabbit =

2012 video game

- Developer: Arkedo Studio
- Publisher: Sega
- Platforms: PlayStation 3; Xbox 360; Windows; iOS
- Release: PlayStation 3; NA: September 25, 2012; EU: October 3, 2012; Xbox 360; September 26, 2012; Windows; October 3, 2012; iOS; February 21, 2013
- Genres: Platform, Metroidvania

Hell Yeah! Wrath of the Dead Rabbit (or simply Hell Yeah!, French: Hell Yeah! La Fureur du lapin mort) is a platform game for Microsoft Windows, PlayStation 3 through PlayStation Network, Xbox 360 through Xbox Live Arcade, and iOS through App Store (the latter as Hell Yeah! Pocket Inferno). It was developed by French developer Arkedo Studio and published by Sega. The game has an ESRB rating of Teen.

The game puts a player in control of Ash, the prince of Hell, as he sets out across Hell on a self-imposed quest to restore his dignity by killing a number of monsters. He accomplishes this with the use of a large circular-saw blade jetpack that serves as both his primary weapon and his main mode of transportation. The game was praised for its visuals, but widely criticized for its control scheme.

== Gameplay ==
Hell Yeah! Wrath of the Dead Rabbit is a side-scrolling platformer. A player controls Ash, who jumps around platforms on a series of seven levels separated by doors and attempts to kill 100 individually named monsters. As the monsters are killed, more doors to new areas are unlocked. The combat uses twin-stick shooter controls, in which movement is controlled by one thumbstick or set of keys, and firing weapons is controlled by the other thumbstick or another set of keys. The player fights the monsters using a variety of projectile weapons, and can purchase additional weapons. Monsters can also be killed by cutting into them with the saw blade. To finish off any of the 100 monsters, the player must perform a quick mini-game, which unlocks a death animation unique to each monster. Failing the mini-game will result in damage to Ash and the monster will regain some life. Aside from the 100 named monsters, levels are also filled with traps and weaker, unnamed monsters that reappear each time the player re-enters that level.

== Plot ==
Ash, a skeletal rabbit and the prince of Hell, has inherited the role of ruler of Hell from his father. After a photographer takes a picture of Ash playing with a rubber duck in the bathtub, Ash sets out to kill the 100 monsters that have seen the photo, to restore his image. The world of Hell Yeah! Wrath of the Dead Rabbit has several zones with different visual styles, including "haunted caves, science labs, casinos and spaceships full of talking animals". The player navigates these zones by traveling on a large buzz-saw-like circular blade that can cut through the environment, can fire a variety of projectile weapons, and is equipped with a jet pack. Ash is assisted in his quest by his butler, Nestor, a top hat-wearing octopus.

== Reception ==
Reception

Aggregate score
Aggregator	Score			
Aggregator	iOS	PC	PS3	Xbox 360
Metacritic	61/100	64/100	68/100	70/100

Review scores
Publication	Score			
Publication	iOS	PC	PS3	Xbox 360
Destructoid	N/A	N/A	N/A	6/10
Eurogamer	N/A	N/A	8/10	N/A
Game Informer	N/A	N/A	8.5/10	8.5/10
GameRevolution	N/A	N/A	N/A	7/10
GameSpot	N/A	N/A	4/10	4/10
GameTrailers	N/A	N/A	N/A	5.8/10
IGN	N/A	4.9/10	4.9/10	4.9/10
Joystiq	N/A	N/A	N/A	4/5
Official Xbox Magazine (US)	N/A	N/A	N/A	7.5/10
PC Gamer (UK)	N/A	72%	N/A	N/A
Pocket Gamer	2.5/5	N/A	N/A	N/A
Polygon	N/A	N/A	N/A	6/10
PlayStation: The Official Magazine	N/A	N/A	8/10	N/A
VentureBeat	N/A	N/A	N/A	71/100
Digital Spy	2/5	N/A	N/A	3/5
Metro	N/A	N/A	4/10	N/A

Hell Yeah! Wrath of the Dead Rabbit and Hell Yeah! Pocket Inferno received "mixed or average reviews" according to the review aggregation website Metacritic. Critics praised the game's visuals, with Lawrence Sonntag of Inside Gaming Daily writing that "every level is bizarre but expertly colored, vibrant, and filled with high-resolution assets", and that the monsters are "what you might find in a second grader's notebook – doodles of ridiculous monsters, only brought to life with impressive talent and animated in HD". Tom Bramwell of Eurogamer wrote that the PlayStation 3 version was "absolutely gorgeous, a delicious feast of tasty animation drowning in buttery detail."

The game's control scheme, on the other hand, received almost universal criticism. Greg Miller of IGN stated that "The platforming is plagued by floaty controls and the inability to use the D-Pad", while James Stephanie Sterling of Destructoid called the controls "unsavory". Richard Cobbett of PC Gamer commented on the PC controls by saying "You want an Xbox 360 controller for this one. You could play it with a keyboard, but only in the same sense that technically you could fly if you flapped your arms hard enough." Kevin Schaller of GameRevolution, however, called the controls "responsive, though it takes a little getting used to".

Gamezebo gave the PC version all five stars, saying, "No matter your stance on outfitting rabbits with guns, you have to admit that Ash’s murderous adventure through the depths of Hell will only encourage other, impressionable young bunnies to do the same. With such a fun, hilarious, and engaging rendition of his experience available by playing Hell Yeah! Wrath of the Dead Rabbit, we are encouraging all members of the rabbit youth to follow his example. Vote no on Prop 415, or God help us all." Edge gave the Xbox 360 version a score of eight out of ten, saying, "Hell Yeah! may wear its warm immaturity on its sleeve, but its jokes are strong, its protagonist and antagonists likeable and its rhythms satisfying." EGMNow gave the same console version a similar score of eight out of ten, saying that it "sits somewhere between a hardcore classic and a shameless parody, and luckily, I happen to be a fan of both. It's not perfect, but like Vincent Vega once said, 'personality goes a long way.'" The Guardian similarly gave it four stars out of five, saying of the game, "If you know someone whose mantra is: 'They don't make games like that anymore,' just force them to play it and they'll have been well and truly silenced." GameZone similarly gave the PlayStation 3 version eight out of ten, saying, "Though it's lacking in replayability without any sort of multiplayer or worthwhile hell-ish content, Hell Yeah! Wrath of the Dead Rabbit is still a superb side-scrolling romp that's worth the $15 price tag…especially if you're looking for something a little different from Sega's camp."
