= Shoot Many Robots =

2012 video game

- Developer: Demiurge Studios
- Publisher: Ubisoft
- Composer: Rich Vreeland
- Platforms: Xbox Live Arcade, PlayStation Network, Windows, Android
- Release: PlayStation Network: NA: March 13, 2012; PAL: March 14, 2012; Xbox Live Arcade; March 14, 2012; Windows; April 6, 2012; Android; March 20, 2013
- Genre: Shooter

Shoot Many Robots is a video game developed by Demiurge Studios and published by Ubisoft for Xbox Live Arcade, PlayStation Network, and Microsoft Windows via Steam. Shoot Many Robots was released in March 2012 for XBLA and PSN, and a month later for Steam. The XBLA version received mixed reviews–a Metacritic score of 67–while other versions received too little attention to result in a meaningful rating.

An Android port was released in 2013 on the Play Store. An iOS version was announced in 2013, but never released.

== Gameplay ==
Shoot Many Robots is a scrolling shooter which supports cooperative play with up to 4 players. Player characters are identified by unique colors.

Players start in the character's RV, where they may equip their character with five items: one weapon that has unlimited ammunition in the game, a special weapon with limited ammo, and hats, pants, and backpacks that can boost performance statistics such as damage given/health or impart special abilities such as slide attacks or a jetpack. They then select a stage to complete, generally following stages in a linear order, but players can return to a previously completed stage.

There are two types of stages. The most common requires the players to make their way through a level from start to finish, often ending on a final boss or a large rush of robots. Checkpoints are laid out through the course, so that if all players die, they respawn at the last checkpoint passed. The other type of stage is a survival one, where players attempt to withstand several rounds of increasingly difficult enemies; as long as the player makes it through the first wave, they have succeeded, but gain better rewards for lasting through bonus stages.

Players fight robots using their weapons, a melee attack, or special attacks granted by their load-out. The robots have offensive and defensive mechanisms. Some fire special slow-moving but powerful bullets that can only be stopped by melee attacking them back to the robot that fired them. Other robots are nearly impervious to attacks from one side, but are vulnerable to attacks from the opposite side. The player has a health meter that drains when they are hit. If they take too much damage they collapse; in multiplayer games, another player can revive them, otherwise they start back at the last checkpoint. The player begins a level with bottles of beer that can be taken to restore health.

Robots drop nuts after dying; this is the game's currency used to buy new equipment. Sometimes robots or special boxes drop crates that contain tickets with which to purchase new equipment, or a large quantity of nuts. These rewards are tied to a player and can only be picked up by that player. Additionally, power-ups may be dropped by the robots which can be picked up by any player, some giving temporary boosts like extra speed or attack damage, while others restore beer or special ammo. Killing each robot also boosts the player's experience level, which affects what equipment the player has access to.

After completing a level, the players are rated with a star-based scoring system based on the number of nuts collected. To boost their score, players can chain robot kills together to increase a scoring multiplier up to 5x, though players must continue to kill robots to maintain this. The total cumulative stars that a player has earned influences which levels the player has access to. Additional nuts are awarded based on relative performance. Once back in the RV, players can use nuts to purchase equipment that they have obtained a ticket for and within their experience level.

== Reception ==
Reception

Aggregate scores
| Aggregator | Score | | |
| Aggregator | PC | PS3 | Xbox 360 |
|---|---|---|---|
| GameRankings | 74% | 67% | 71% |
| Metacritic | 70/100 | N/A | 67/100 |

Review scores
| Publication | Score | | |
| Publication | PC | PS3 | Xbox 360 |
|---|---|---|---|
| Destructoid | N/A | N/A | 8/10 |
| Electronic Gaming Monthly | N/A | N/A | 8/10 |
| Eurogamer | N/A | N/A | 7/10 |
| GameSpot | N/A | 7.5/10 | 7.5/10 |
| GameTrailers | N/A | N/A | 7.8/10 |
| GameZone | N/A | N/A | 8.5/10 |
| IGN | N/A | 4.5/10 | 4.5/10 |
| Joystiq | N/A | N/A | 3/5 stars |
| Official Xbox Magazine (US) | N/A | N/A | 4/10 |
| PC Gamer (UK) | 77% | N/A | N/A |
| Polygon | N/A | N/A | 7/10 |
| PlayStation: The Official Magazine | N/A | 7/10 | N/A |
| VentureBeat | N/A | N/A | 78/100 |
| Metro | N/A | N/A | 5/10 |

The Windows and Xbox 360 versions of Shoot Many Robots received "average" reviews according to the review aggregation website Metacritic. VentureBeat said of the Xbox 360 version, "As team-carnage games go, you'll get some mileage out of this one. Grab a few of your drinkin' buddies, and have yourselves a fun (and cheap) night of gratuitous hillbilly firepower and richly deserved robo-death. Preferably with your beer goggles on." IGN said of the PlayStation 3 and Xbox 360 versions, "the most identifiable problem is the controls," and called out co-op as a "chaotic mess."
