= Haunting at Cliffhouse =

2012 video game

- Developer: Cindy Pondillo
- Publisher: Cindy Pondillo
- Engine: AGS engine
- Platform: Windows
- Release: 2012
- Genre: Adventure
- Mode: Single-player

Hauntings at Cliffhouse is a 2012 point-and-click adventure game. It was a solo project of Cindy Pondillo; the independent developer's third adventure.

== Plot and gameplay ==
Sarah Blake travels to the Cliffhouse Bed and Breakfast resort to withdraw after the death of her husband.

== Critical reception ==
Katie Smith of Adventure Gamers praised the artwork although deemed the characters forgettable. Avsn-Nikki of Adventurespiele wrote that Pondillo crafted a story that slowly and successfully builds in suspense.
