= Robbery Bob =

2012 video game

- App icon
- Developer: Level Eight
- Publishers: Chillingo (formerly); Level Eight AB (iOS); DECA Games (Android)
- Producer: Johan Westin
- Artists: Rickard Jäger; Fredrik Johansson; Markus Lundberg; Johan Wallberg; Anna Windseth
- Platforms: iOS, Android, Windows
- Release: May 3, 2012: iOS: May 3, 2012; Android: October 24, 2012; Windows: October 21, 2015; tvOS: December 12, 2019
- Genres: Stealth, action
- Mode: Single-player

Robbery Bob: Man of Steal (a pun on man of steel, an epithet associated with Superman, and also known by the subtitle King of Sneak) is a 2012 stealth action game developed by Swedish studio Level Eight and originally published by Chillingo. In it, the player controls a robber named Bob and must sneak around houses to complete missions. Robbery Bob was released for iOS on May 3, 2012, and has been met with a mixed reception for its gameplay and art quality.

== Gameplay and release ==
Throughout 50 levels, the player controls Bob, the titular player character, from a top-down perspective. Bob must sneak around houses and steal items without being caught. Enemies, including police officers, dogs, and family members, will roam around the house. Bob can put on disguises, hide, change the enemies' direction, and make distractions. The player can run, but it will lure enemies towards them. The level ends once they are out of the house, and stars grade the player's performance based on speed and accuracy. On May 3, 2012, Chillingo released Robbery Bob for iOS.

== Plot ==
In prison, Bob meets a "Strange Dealer", who helps him out of jail. He requests Bob to return the favor by stealing items from different buildings. However, Strange Dealer traps Bob, and after he escapes, he calls the police to the Strange Dealer's house and escapes from his slavery.

Later, the Bob is seen downtown, where he runs into Biff. Bob is grabbed by the Biff and is used to commit robberies for him. Bob enters into Biff's apartment and sees the police, before Biff fights the officers. Bob quickly steals everything he can and escapes.

Then, Bob travels to a desert to seek safety, but Dr. Thievius captures and forces him to steal components for various devices. However, in one of those robberies, he accidentally tells Bob of a secret exit; while all this happens, Dr. Thievius is begging him to come back and trying to blackmail him, and before Bob escapes, he activates the self-destruct system of the laboratory. He manages to escape, and the explosion blows Dr. Thievius into the air.

== Reception ==
Reception

Aggregate score
Aggregator	Score
Metacritic	71/100

Review scores
Publication	Score
Pocket Gamer	3.5/5
TouchArcade	3.5/5 (Robbery Bob); 4/5 (Robbery Bob 2)
Paste	7/10
Gamezebo	70/100

Robbery Bob has a "mixed or average" score on Metacritic.

The gameplay was received poorly. In a TouchArcade review, Brendan Saricks felt that its sneaking mechanic went from "real strong" to "a repetitive room-by-room hunt". Saricks compared Robbery Bob to the 2011 video game The Last Rocket, criticizing that the game mechanics did not go together and that the gameplay was luck-based. James Nouch of Pocket Gamer thought the controls were "clumsy", while AJ Dellinger of Gamezebo thought they were "pretty fluid". Although he thought the dialogue was "cringeworthy", Dellinger found that the story was "intense", writing about the crimes Bob commits.

Robbery Bob's art style was met with criticism. Luke Larsen of Paste magazine described it as "tacky", presented through "cartoonish antics" and "forgettable characters". Dellinger said the graphics mostly consisted of smoothed "pixels from the '90s", and he stated that the plants were "drawings from kindergarteners".

== Sequel ==
A sequel, titled Robbery Bob 2: Double Trouble, was released on June 3, 2015.

In the game, the player is a robber named Bob who has to steal loot in various buildings while avoiding getting caught by guards, security cameras and lasers and an increasing number of traps. Robbery Bob 2 was released on the App Store June 4, 2015

TouchArcade rated it four out of five stars, with reviewer Chris Carter praising it for filling a niche for heist games and focusing on stealth over action while criticizing the story’s premise as "stupid" and the art design as "forgettable". Carter gave the game a rating of 4/5, praising the controls as "increasingly easy to navigate".

Robbery Bob 2 received positive reviews for its Gameplay, while its art style and story was criticized.

Reviews
Publication	Score
TouchArcade	4/5
App Store	4.6/5
Google Play	4.3/5

=== Playa de Mafioso ===
Bob is seen walking in a road, whistling loudly. However, a police hiding behind a tree, listens his whistling and chases him. Bob, aware that the police has found him, starts running fast, but accidentally crashes a wedding and destroys the cake. Don Canneloni, Mafia boss and father of the bride, gets angry at bob and makes him pay back all the items he ruined by making him steal them from other peoples houses. However, one day Don Canneloni gives hints to Bob that he should steal a wedding ring "Shiny and Blue". However, Bob mistakes the hints for a police hat and steals one, however when the police sees Bob waving the police hat in front of Don, they mistake him for an undercover cop who has caught Don Canneloni, who is wanted by the police.

=== Shamville ===
Ashamed of the trouble he made, Bob runs away from the police and enters a sewer, however, a dog is seen having an affection for bob and runs after him, in the sewer he meets Nickie Heisst, who is spying on Dr. Theivous. He presumably falls in love with her, however, the dog who had followed bob all this time, starts barking and Theivous is alerted, running after them with a stun gun. Angered by Bob, Nickie makes him do favors to find and stop what Theivous was doing. They get him arrested, but Theivous manages to mind control one of his dogs with his mind-control gear.

=== Seagull Bay ===
Bob is fishing, and accidentally pulls a human from the water. Confused by what just happened, the human starts talking about aliens coming to invade the city. Bob is then startled by the thought of aliens capturing Earth and helps the human to build a machine to scare the aliens away by stealing loot from houses. They then scare away the aliens.
