= Puddle (video game) =

2012 puzzle video game

- Xbox Live cover art
- Developer: Neko Entertainment
- Publishers: Konami; Neko Entertainment (Wii U); Playdigious (Android, iOS)
- Platforms: PlayStation 3, Xbox 360, Wii U, PlayStation Vita, Windows, Mac OS X, Linux, Android, PlayStation 4
- Release: PlayStation Network: NA: January 31, 2012; EU: January 25, 2012; Xbox Live Arcade; January 25, 2012; PlayStation Vita: NA: July 24, 2012; EU: August 1, 2012; Nintendo eShop: PAL: November 30, 2012; NA: January 31, 2013; JP: December 24, 2014; Windows; October 18, 2012 (GOG.com); November 9, 2012 (Steam); January 17, 2013 (Desura); PlayStation 4: EU: May 28, 2014; NA: July 1, 2014
- Genre: Puzzle-platform
- Mode: Single-player

Puddle is a puzzle-platform game developed by Neko Entertainment and published by Konami for PlayStation Vita, PlayStation 3, PlayStation 4 and Xbox 360. The game was also self-published by Neko Entertainment for Wii U, and for the PC through Steam, GOG.com, and Desura.

== Gameplay ==
The player must guide a puddle of fluid to its target destination by tilting the scene, not by moving the fluid itself. They must work with physics: friction, momentum, and the unique properties of each type of fluid and environment to send as much of each puddle past such obstacles as fires, rifts, spills and others, through environments like pipes, plants, laboratories, a human body, a sewer, a rocket, a foundry and a power station. The experience is physics based, making the fluid motion realistic. The game allows the players to be a liquid like Nitroglycerin, and they need to guide it to a certain point. Nitroglycerin tends to explode, so the players must learn to carefully guide it. The game has 49 levels, 2 difficulties (extreme and normal), leaderboards and medals.

== Development ==
The game was presented at the Independent Gaming Festival at GDC 2010, winning a Student Showcase prize.

== Reception ==
Reception

Aggregate scores
Aggregator	Score
GameRankings	74.14% (PS Vita), 69.70% (Xbox 360), 69.75% (PS3), 70.58% (Wii U)
Metacritic	77/100 (PS Vita), 68/100 (Xbox 360), 71/100 (PS3), 70/100 (Wii U)

Review score
Publication	Score
PC Gamer (US)	80/100

Puddle received generally positive reviews from game critics. Rick Lane of PC Gamer gave the game an 80/100 score.
