= 1000 Amps =

2012 video game

- Macintosh cover art
- Developer: Brandon Brizzi
- Publisher: Brandon Brizzi
- Platforms: Windows, OS X
- Release: WW: February 22, 2012
- Genres: Puzzle-platform, Metroidvania
- Mode: Single-player

1000 Amps is a 2012 action-adventure puzzle-platform game, developed by Brandon Brizzi.

== Plot ==
There is a power outage in the Amp Tree System; Plug must navigate the darkness and repair the lights, one room at a time.

== Gameplay ==
The player controls Plug as he makes his way through the various interconnected rooms of the Amp Tree System. He must illuminate all of the tiles in each room by walking over them. As he gradually lights up the room, he will be able to jump higher; this effect is temporary, as his jumping ability resets upon entering a new room. However, he will also obtain other, permanent upgrades to help him solve more complex puzzles, such as the ability to teleport.

== Reception ==
1000 Amps received mixed reviews. John Walker of Rock Paper Shotgun recommended the game, saying, "I really want you to play this. It's such a smart, enormous game, often enormously difficult, but get stuck and there are always another dozen rooms you can try." Gamezebo also praised 1000 Amps, calling it a "stylish, expansive game that relies on its attractive, high-contrast visuals, as well as the opportunities it gives the player for exploration", though said the game's mechanic of resetting rooms when exited "can sometimes be frustrating, as it's easy to bounce out of a room unintentionally". PC Gamer gave it 64/100, calling it "[a]n often frustrating game built around a clever idea", and argued that the darkening of unsolved rooms makes "exploration [become] an exercise in feeling around in the dark, unsure if you're about to plunge down a hole into another room entirely, losing all your progress in the current room." On a positive note, it also said "[t]he core idea of powering up your character progressively is a solid one, and there are moments of real beauty in the stark-but-cute art style", though wrote the game was too flawed as a whole to take full advantage of these ideas.
