= Nancy Drew: The Deadly Device =

2012 video game

The Deadly Device
- Developer: Her Interactive
- Publisher: Her Interactive
- Series: Nancy Drew
- Platforms: Microsoft Windows, Mac OS X
- Release: October 23, 2012
- Genre: Adventure
- Mode: Single-player

Nancy Drew: The Deadly Device is the 27th installment in the Nancy Drew point-and-click adventure game series by Her Interactive. The game is available for play on Microsoft Windows and Mac OS X platforms. It has an ESRB rating of E10+ for moments of mild violence. Players take on the first-person view of fictional amateur sleuth Nancy Drew and must solve the mystery through interrogation of suspects, solving puzzles and discovering clues. There are two levels of gameplay, Amateur and Master sleuth modes, each offering a different difficulty level of puzzles and hints, however neither of these changes affect the plot of the game. The game is loosely based on the books The Crime Lab Case (2000) and In and Out of Love (1997).

== Plot ==
Theoretical physicist Niko Jovic is found fatally electrocuted in a remote Colorado laboratory, Technology of Tomorrow Today, under suspicious circumstances. Niko had been researching the wireless transmission of electricity, a scientific breakthrough which if accomplished could be sold for millions. The lab owner, Victor Lossett, has asked Nancy Drew to investigate the murder while going undercover, posing as a potential new buyer of the lab.

Research assistant Ellie York gives Nancy a demonstration of the lab's Tesla coil, which she explains had electrocuted Niko due to being configured incorrectly. Ellie says that lab engineer Ryan Kilpatrick had configured the coil that night, but that Ryan claimed Niko had insisted, for inexplicable reasons, that she do so. Ryan was arrested after Niko's murder, but was released due to a lack of sufficient evidence, although Victor still believes Ryan is the murderer.

Nancy distracts the lab's head security guard, Gray Cortright, away from his post and uses his computer to discover that the key card that swiped into the lab shortly before Niko was murdered does not match any other key card in the logs. She also finds a security tape that does not show anyone other than Niko entering the lab before he died. Gray later tells Nancy he believes the video has been modified to remove the footage of the killer entering the lab.

Nancy sneaks into the main lab, against Victor's orders, to learn more about its technology and investigate further clues. She learns that Ellie waited 30 minutes to call 911 after finding Niko's body the night he died. Ellie also deeply misses her home and family, but feels she must stay at the lab to pay off her large amount of student debt. Meanwhile, fellow research assistant Mason Quinto had an intense personal dislike of Niko and was concerned about Niko potentially stealing his work; Ryan has been bypassing the security system to sneak around the lab without being tracked; and Gray secretly has a PhD in theoretical physics and was a close friend of Niko, who hired him as a security guard after Gray decided he no longer wanted to work as a scientist.

Eventually, Nancy learns that Ryan was photographed at an award ceremony out of state the night of Niko's murder, clearing her name. Nancy gets locked in the photolithography lab with the oxygen turned off and has to climb through a vent to escape. Nancy runs into Mason in the main lab and must save him from the Tesla coil after someone activates the machine. Victor, who has until this point been absent from the lab and only reachable by phone, arrives at the lab just as Nancy is saving Mason. He asks Nancy to remove herself from the case and go home. Nancy discovers a computer inside a secret room in the lab that shows the unedited footage of the night of the murder, revealing that Victor entered the lab and killed Niko.

Nancy confronts Victor, who knocks her unconscious. She wakes up inside the Faraday cage and sees Victor about to turn on the Tesla coil and kill her. He admits that he hired Nancy in the hopes that she would mistakenly find Ryan, Mason, Ellie, or Gray responsible for the murder. Victor killed Niko because Victor wanted himself and the lab to get rich off of Niko's research, whereas Niko was not motivated by money and wanted his discoveries to be released to the public with no strings attached.

Nancy escapes the Faraday cage, and Victor is arrested and denied bail. Gray resumes his work as a scientist and decides to work with Mason, Ellie, and Ryan to try to finish Niko's work according to his wishes.

== Development ==
=== Characters ===
- Nancy Drew (Lani Minella) - Nancy is an 18-year-old amateur detective from the fictional town of River Heights in the United States. She is the only playable character in the game, which means the player must solve the mystery from her perspective.
- Niko Jovic (Josh Crandall) - Rumors in the scientific community said that he had discovered the secret to wireless energy transfer. But before he could release his findings to the world, he was found murdered. Like Tesla, Niko was clever yet secretive. Could someone be looking for what he left behind?
- Ryan Kilpatrick (Katherine Grant-Suttie) - Ryan is a technical engineer that has built and modified several parts of the lab. Her knowledge of the Tesla coil makes her a prime suspect. Is her nice girl impression genuine or an act?
- Mason Quinto (Marc Biagi) - Mason is the smart, driven, and arrogant senior lab assistant. He likes structure and perfection, and values his work. Unlike Niko, Mason believes in proprietary rights. How far will he go to get the credit for his work that he thinks he deserves?
- Ellie York (Sara Mountjoy-Pepka) - Ellie works the night shift in the research department. She is a little evasive and does not get along well with Mason, which drove her to work opposite shifts. While appearing genuinely shaken, her actions after Niko's death seem to indicate that she could be hiding something.
- Gray Cortright (Mark Dodson) - Gray is the head of security. Not the friendly type, he comes across as a little intimidating and is not forthcoming while being questioned. His knowledge and unrestricted access to all areas provide plenty of opportunity for sneaking around unnoticed.
- Victor Lossett (David Cravens-O'Farrell) - Victor is the co-owner of the lab. He has hired you to solve the cold case murder. Eager for the case to be solved, he pushes Nancy to find the culprit. Niko's work and name appear to be very important to him, but there could be more to this mystery than meets the eye.

Additional voice work was performed by Jayme Crandall.

== Reception ==
Jinny Gudmundsen of USA Today rated it 3.5/4 stars and wrote, "While this mystery is exciting, what makes it even better is that it is filled with intellectually challenging puzzles — most of which are baked into the story...The developer does a great job of combining real science with a compelling mystery." Brandy Shaul of Gamezebo rated it 3.5/5 stars and wrote, "The storyline is easily the best thing Nancy Drew: Deadly Device has going for it. With so many installments under its proverbial belt, Her Interactive clearly knows how to develop an intriguing tale, and that's no exception here." Merlina McGovern of Adventure Gamers rated it 3.5/5 stars and wrote, "Despite its slow start and limited exploration, The Deadly Device provides a good jolt to the franchise with its compelling story and fun puzzles."

Preceded by Nancy Drew: Tomb of the Lost Queen	Nancy Drew Computer Games	Succeeded by Nancy Drew: Ghost of Thornton Hall
