= Pastry Panic =

2012 video game

- App icon
- Developer(s): Underground Pixel
- Publisher(s): Underground Pixel
- Platform(s): iOS
- Release: May 24, 2012
- Genre(s): Platform
- Mode(s): Single-player

Pastry Panic is a 2012 platform game developed by the American indie studio Underground Pixel. In the game, the player controls a dinosaur who must eat as many sweets as possible to score points. The game was released on May 24, 2012, for iOS. Since its release, the game has been generally well received by critics.

== Gameplay and release ==
In one of Pastry Panic's gameplay modes, the player must get food while anchored to the center of the screen.

In Pastry Panic, the core gameplay revolves around a dinosaur-lizard hybrid named Dino eating as many sweets as possible to score points, while also consuming all of the bolts that appear on-screen. When the bolt counter hits zero, too many pieces of metal have escaped, clogging the gears and ending the game.

The player has a choice between two different modes, Mad Dash and Tongue Tied. The former offers the player the opportunity to walk along conveyor belts eating different treats. In the latter, the player remains static in the center and grabs snacks using his long tongue.

The game offers the player power-ups to boost their scores, such as slowing down the conveyor belts. Other power-ups can have negative consequences and make the game more difficult, such as taking an extra bolt away from the counter or reversing the belt direction. The game was released on the App Store for iOS on May 24, 2012.

== Reception ==
Reception

Aggregate score
| Aggregator | Score |
|---|---|
| Metacritic | 70/100 |

Review scores
| Publication | Score |
|---|---|
| Gamezebo | 80/100 |
| Pocket Gamer | 3.5/5 |
| 148Apps | 4/5 |
| AppSpy | 3/5 |

On Metacritic, Pastry Panic received a "mixed" score of 70/100. Harry Slater of Pocket Gamer gave the game 7/10 calling it simple and addictive, but lacking greater features. Rob Rich of 148Apps rated Pastry Panic 4/5 stars, calling it "another pick-up-and-play iOS game destined for classic status." Dant Rambo of Gamezebo shared similar sentiments, giving it the same rating and noting its simplicity and addictiveness, as well praising its retro graphics.
