= Nyu Media =

Video game publisher

Nyu Media Ltd.
- Industry: Video game publishing
- Genre: Dōjin soft
- Founded: 2011
- Defunct: 2022
- Website: nyu-media.com

Nyu Media Ltd. was a video game publisher known for localizing Japanese independent dōjin soft games into English. They were established in 2011 and released two batches of dōjin games that spanned genres including shoot 'em ups, beat 'em ups, platformers, adventure games, and action-RPGs.

In 2022, the company went out of business, selling most of their publishing licenses to other publishers.

== History ==
Nyu Media Limited announced its first titles as a video game publisher in November 2011. Their first batch of localized releases included six Japanese indie (dōjin) games: bullet hell shooters eXceed 2nd: Vampire REX and eXceed 3rd: Jade Penetration Black Package by Tennen-sozai, 3D shoot 'em up Ether Vapor Remaster and beat 'em up Fairy Bloom Freesia by Edelweiss, adventure game Cherry Tree High Comedy Club by Atelier773, and side-scrolling shooter Satazius by Astro Port. A month later, the company partnered with Capcom to publish and distribute their upcoming titles. Nyu saw the partnership as a means for legitimizing the doujin community. The games were released for Microsoft Windows via services such as Steam, GamersGate, and later from MangaGamer without copy protection (DRM).

The second batch of games for 2012 was announced in August and included five titles: platformer Eryi's Action by Xtal Sword, action-RPG Croixleur by Souvenir Circ, and shoot 'em ups Kamui, RefleX, and Alltynex Second by Siter Skain.

In early 2014, the company announced Gigantic Army, a side-scrolling shooter with 16-bit era graphics. The same year, they brought four games to Steam Greenlight to win support from the Steam community. One of these games, the fighting game Yatagarasu Attack on Cataclysm, raised over $100,000 through crowdfunding website Indiegogo, and led to a dispute between Nyu and PayPal when the latter held up to half of the funds as a "reserve". PayPal ultimately released the funds and, following several similar incidents, announced that they would be reforming their crowdfunding policies for the future. Nyu released their first Japanese role-playing game, The Sacred Tears TRUE, in September 2014.

On June 15, 2022, Nyu Media announced that they were discontinuing business. Most games published by the company were picked up by other publishers, with the exception of Cherry Tree High Comedy Club and its sequel Cherry Tree High I! My! Girls, which was delisted following the end of the 2022 Steam Summer Sale on July 7.
