= Paranautical Activity =

2014 video game

- Windows cover art
- Developers: Code Avarice; Digerati (Atonement Edition)
- Engine: Unity
- Platforms: Linux; macOS; Microsoft Windows; PlayStation 4; PlayStation Vita; Xbox One; Wii U; Nintendo Switch
- Release: Microsoft Windows: WW: October 20, 2014; WW: February 12, 2015 (Atonement Edition); PlayStation 4, PlayStation Vita, Xbox One: WW: October 2015; Wii U: EU: March 17, 2016; NA: April 14, 2016; Switch: WW: June 28, 2018
- Genre: First-person shooter
- Mode: Single-player

Paranautical Activity is a first-person shooter video game developed by American indie studio Code Avarice, and later by Digerati. It was released for Microsoft Windows in a beta form in February 2013, and after completing the Early Access program on Steam, was fully released on October 20, 2014.

The game struggled with Valve's Steam service. Valve initially refused to allow it on its Greenlight system while the developer was in talks with another publisher, and later pulled it from Steam after its lead developer, Mike Maulbeck, threatened Valve's CEO, Gabe Newell, on social media. The game's development was transferred to a new studio, Digerati, and re-released on Steam under a "Deluxe Atonement" version that included new content.

== Gameplay ==
Paranautical Activity is a first-person shooter that uses procedural dungeon generation and permadeath, features common in roguelikes. The various levels in the game are based around a room structure similar to the dungeons of The Binding of Isaac, which include random enemy generation, mini-boss rooms which give items, shops and treasure rooms where players can buy health, armor and better weapons. Killed monsters drop health and in-game money to be used in shops. Each level features a boss battle that must be fought before the player can move on to the next level.

== Publishing ==
Paranautical Activity was released in a publicly available beta form in February 2013.

In August 2012, Code Avarice had submitted the game to Steam's Greenlight service – a means to allow Steam users to vote on games they would like to see on the platform. While the game was in the Greenlight phase, Code Avarice and Adult Swim Games opened discussions to have Adult Swim publish the game on Steam. When Adult Swim began working to set up the game's publication on Steam, Valve saw a conflict with the pre-existing Greenlight page; Valve's Doug Lombardi stated that they did not want to send a message that developers could bypass the Greenlight process by finding a publisher for their game with whom they would split revenue from. Code Avarice's Mike Maulbeck was not aware that the Greenlight page would be a conflict, having the impression that everyone had to go through Greenlight, and once Valve rendered its decision, the developers decided they could not easily work with Adult Swim to complete the title, outside of the publishers' offers to fund trips to trade shows and conventions. Code Avarice would later run a successful Kickstarter campaign during August 2013 to complete the game, obtaining $12,000 of the $10,000 requested, and fund its publication on their own through Steam. Shortly following the Kickstarter, the game became available on Steam via its Early Access program.

Another issue with Steam occurred after the game was completed, moving it out of the Early Access program to a full-fledged release in October 2014. Though the developers had set the game to be in full release, Steam's store page still indicated the game was in Early Access. Maulbeck, frustrated with this mislabeling, let out a series of complaints on social media against Steam and Valve, including an alleged death threat to Valve's Gabe Newell. Though Maulbeck later said the message was not meant to be taken seriously, Valve pulled the game from the Steam store, saying that they had ceased discussions with Code Avarice as a result of the threat. Failing to make amends with Valve, Maulbeck opted to sell his part of Code Avarice to his co-developer Travis Pfenning in order to separate himself in the hope that Valve would allow the game on Steam. Maulbeck later reconsidered this decision and rejoined Code Avarice.

Code Avarice sold the rights to a new developer, Digerati, completely separating the original developers from the game. Digerati worked with Valve and Code Avarice to restore the game to Steam on February 12, 2015, under a new "Deluxe Atonement Edition", adding some new content alongside the re-release.
