= Mad Riders =

2012 video game

- Developer: Techland
- Publisher: Ubisoft
- Engine: Chrome Engine 4
- Platforms: PlayStation 3; Xbox 360; Microsoft Windows; Mac OS X
- Release: May 30, 2012
- Genre: Off-road racing
- Modes: Single-player, multiplayer

Mad Riders is a racing video game for PlayStation 3, Xbox 360, Microsoft Windows, and Mac OS X. It was developed by Techland and published by Ubisoft. Mad Riders was released in 2012. The game received mixed reviews upon its release, with critics praising the game's visuals but taking issue with its physics and controls.

== Gameplay ==
Mad Riders is off-road racing video game. Players control an all terrain vehicle (ATV) and race other ATVs around a series of tracks. Players can collect coins placed along the tracks in order to activate a short boost in speed and blue tokens that allow players to temporarily access shortcuts. After launching off of ramps, players can perform tricks, which also give players the ability to activate a short boost in speed. Obstacles are placed both on the ground and in the air, and players have the ability to steer their ATV while airborne.

The game features 45 tracks that can be played over five different race modes, including a time trial mode and a mode where players try to score as many points as possible by performing stunts. Races can be done either individually or as part of longer tournaments. Players are given experience points for both completing races and for performing stunts, which is used to unlock new vehicles and color schemes. The game also has a multiplayer option with races containing up to twelve players. Players can join multiplayer races that are about to begin directly from single player races that they are currently in.

== Reception ==
Reception

Aggregate score
Aggregator	Score		
Aggregator	PC	PS3	Xbox 360
Metacritic	64/100	71/100	64/100

Review scores
Publication	Score		
Publication	PC	PS3	Xbox 360
Destructoid	N/A	N/A	7/10
Edge	N/A	N/A	5/10
Electronic Gaming Monthly	N/A	N/A	5/10
Game Informer	N/A	7.75/10	7.75/10
GamesMaster	N/A	N/A	51%
GameSpot	N/A	N/A	5.5/10
Hyper	N/A	N/A	6/10
PlayStation Official Magazine – UK	N/A	8/10	N/A
Official Xbox Magazine (US)	N/A	N/A	5/10
PC Gamer (UK)	67%	N/A	N/A
The Digital Fix	N/A	6/10	N/A

Mad Riders received "mixed or average reviews" on all platforms according to the review aggregation website Metacritic. Critics drew comparisons between Mad Riders and Techland's previous off-road racing game, Nail'd, with some reviews praising Mad Riders as an improvement over Nail'd. PlayStation Official Magazine – UK said that the game was reminiscent of 2010 game Nail'd, but "far superior", while Official Xbox Magazine UK called the game "structured far more intelligently" than its predecessor. Mad Riders's visuals were largely praised. Sean Evans, writing for GameSpot, praised the game's cel shading as working well with the game's terrain and bringing an "appealing look that adds some much-needed personality". McKinley Noble of EGMNow, however, pointed out that while the courses are "beautiful-looking", boosting "obscures your vision and makes it harder to point out landmarks".

Critics were much less positive about the game's gameplay itself, taking issue with the physics engine and controls. Official Xbox Magazine commented that the handling "feels more like socks on a waxed floor than wheels on dirt", while OXM UK and EGMNow both called it "floaty". Critics also took issue with the game's propensity to respawn players (move players back to an earlier point on the map) if they veered even slightly off of the course. The critics also criticized the game for a lack of originality.
