= Nervous Brickdown =

2007 video game

- North American cover art
- Developer: Arkedo Studio
- Publishers: WW: Eidos Interactive; JP: Success
- Designer: Aurélien Regard
- Platform: Nintendo DS
- Release: NA: June 26, 2007; EU: September 7, 2007; AU: October 12, 2007; JP: January 24, 2008
- Genre: Breakout clone
- Modes: Single-player, two players

Nervous Brickdown ^{JPN} is a Breakout clone video game developed by the French team Arkedo Studio and published by Eidos Interactive for Nintendo DS in 2007.

== Game modes ==
The game features three different modes: Arcade, which is a succession of levels set in 10 different worlds; Multi, which allows up to two players to play the game together, and Shuffle, which chooses five levels randomly for the player to play.

== Reception ==
Reception

Aggregate score
Aggregator	Score
Metacritic	70/100

Review scores
Publication	Score
1Up.com	C
Eurogamer	6/10
Famitsu	29/40
GameSpot	7.5/10
GameSpy	3.5/5
GameZone	8.3/10
IGN	7.9/10
Nintendo Power	7/10
Pocket Gamer	4/5
VideoGamer.com	5/10

The game received "average" reviews according to the review aggregation website Metacritic. In Japan, where the game was ported and published by Success on January 24, 2008, Famitsu gave it a score of two eights, one seven, and one six for a total of 29 out of 40.

== Notes ==
Known in Japan as SuperLite 2500 Brickdown: Block Kuzushi no France Kakumei ya~a~! (SuperLite2500 BRICKDOWN ブロックくずしのフランス革命やぁ～！, Suupaa Raito Ni Sen Go Hyaku Burikkydaun Burokku Kuzushi no Furansu Kakumei yaaaa!; SuperLite 2500 Brickdown: Revolutionary Block Destruction From France!)
