= World Gone Sour =

2011 video game

- Developer: Playbrains
- Publisher: Capcom
- Engine: Gamebryo
- Platforms: Windows, PlayStation 3, Xbox Live Arcade
- Release: Windows; December 20, 2011; PS3 (PSN): NA: April 10, 2012; Xbox 360 (XBLA): NA: April 11, 2012
- Genre: Platform
- Modes: Single-player, multiplayer

World Gone Sour is a 3D side-scrolling platform game which promotes Sour Patch Kids, a type of sour gummy candy. It was developed by Canadian studio Playbrains and published by Capcom and released on December 20, 2011 for Windows. A PlayStation Network version was released on April 10, 2012, with an Xbox Live Arcade version released a day later.

By August 3, 2015, the game had been delisted from storefronts on all three systems.

== Plot ==
The player takes the role of a green Sour Patch Kid who wishes to be eaten, as do other candy in the game. At the start of the game, the character and his red friend are about to be taken to a theater to be sold when a rip in the packaging causes the red candy to fall out. The packet is purchased by a movie-goer; when the green candy is about to be eaten the buyer trips causing the green candy to be thrown in the trash. He then sets off on a journey with the goal of being eaten, while encountering other abandoned Sour Patch Kids. He also meets corrupted Sour Patch Kids who have gone "sour" and are lashing out at others for being forgotten.

== Gameplay ==
The game is a 3D sidescroller, consisting of 13 levels, playable to one or two players. The player is joined by other "followers" who are abandoned Sour Patch Kids, trekking across a number of platforms from left and right and maneuvering around the playable area. Boss fight levels are interspersed and generally follow a series of regular levels themed around a given setting, designed to reflect the story's progression. The player must, at times, sacrifice other Sour Patch Kids to overcome enemies and hazards. Gumdrops and Stars are featured as collectible items, worth extra life accumulation and level score points (respectively); these items may be hidden or placed in areas that the player cannot safely access without using followers. For example, if a gumdrop or star is hovering above a hot stove or other deadly hazard, the player can retrieve them, without taking damage or dying, by throwing followers into the desired items; upon being touched, the items are instantly collected. Checkpoints appear as bottle rockets which fire upon activation. Provided the player has extra lives, collected items are not lost if the player is killed. If the player dies without extra lives, the game ends, offering the option to quit or restart the level from the beginning; either way, the player's previous count of extra lives is restored as if the failed level was never played. Followers abandoned, killed, or sacrificed in the game will soon respawn and rejoin the player. Extra points are awarded in each level for either dying or killing followers in a series of specific different ways (8 possibilities, 1 instance of each is counted per level); extra points are also awarded for collecting "secret" golden gummies (5 per regular level) and for rescuing all the level's followers (25 per level).

== Reception ==
Reception

Aggregate score
Aggregator	Score	
Aggregator	PS3	Xbox 360
Metacritic	61/100	69/100

Review scores
Publication	Score	
Publication	PS3	Xbox 360
Destructoid	N/A	6/10
Game Informer	6.75/10	6.75/10
GameRevolution	1/5	N/A
GameSpot	6.5/10	6.5/10
GameZone	N/A	7.5/10
IGN	6.5/10	N/A
Official Xbox Magazine (US)	N/A	6.5/10
PlayStation: The Official Magazine	6/10	N/A

The PlayStation 3 and Xbox 360 versions received "mixed or average reviews" according to the review aggregation website Metacritic.
