= Dark Scavenger =

2012 video game

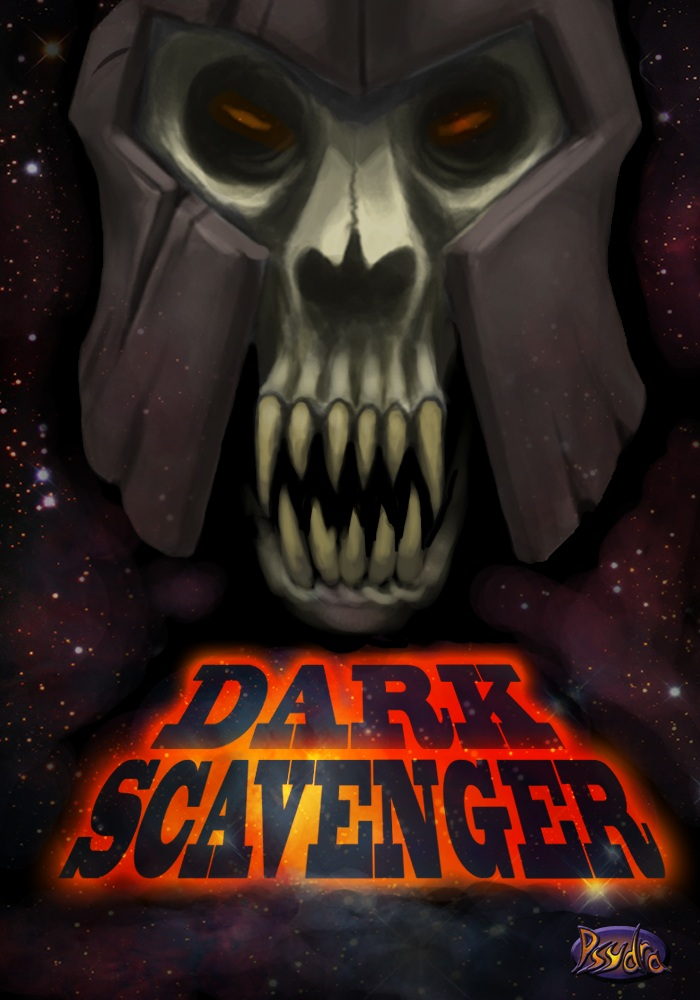
- Developer: Psydra Games
- Publisher: Psydra Games
- Engine: Adobe Flash
- Platforms: Windows, Mac
- Release: WW: July 12, 2012
- Genres: Point-and-click adventure, Role-playing
- Mode: Single-player

Dark Scavenger is a point-and-click adventure role-playing game video game published and developed by Canadian indie studio Psydra Games. It was released for PC and Steam on July 12, 2012, and May 16, 2014, respectfully.

The game is centered on a space traveler being rescued by aliens known as "Dark Scavengers". The player helps the aliens by scavenging an unnamed planet and help them fix their ship. The game offers over six hours of gameplay and over a hundred items that can be made through its crafting system.

Dark Scavenger received generally positive reviews from video game critics. Praise was given to the games writing and gameplay mechanics. Problems raised about the game came from its visuals, citing the lack of moving graphics.

== Gameplay ==
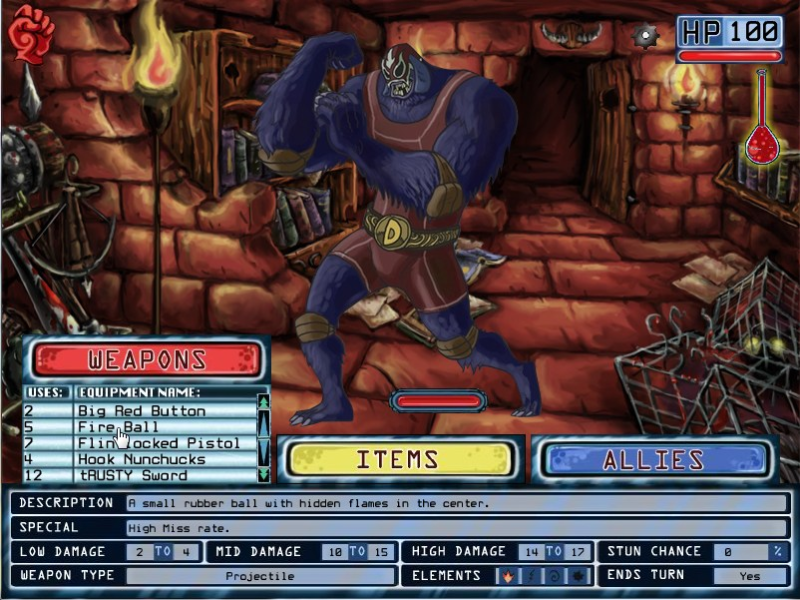
The combat system for Dark Scavenger.

Dark Scavenger is a turn-based point-and-click adventure game. The game includes a crafting system, with over a hundred weapons that can be forged.

The game is centered on a nameless protagonist floating in space. The player is then visited by a God-like blob, before being rescued by three aliens known as "Dark Scavengers": Kamaho, a skeleton; Falsen, a green man with a perpetual grin; and Gazer, a mute alien. The player helps out the aliens fix and find a power supply for the ship.

== Development and release ==
Dark Scavenger was developed and published by Psydra Games. It was first announced on May 26, 2011. The game was first conceived by Psydra Games' Project Designer Alex Gold while in high school. Originally created as a pen-and-paper RPG with the same name, the games lore and system from there while being modified heavily and simplified.

The game was featured in "The Leftfield Collection" at Rezzed in 2012. Michael Plant, writing for The Independent, called Dark Scavenger one of the best games at the event. In September 2012, It was part of a thirty-five game lineup at The Boston Festival of Indie Games. The game was later released for Steam Greenlight on May 16, 2014.

== Reception ==
Dark Scavenger received generally positive reviews from video game critics. Matt Beaudette from Hardcore Gamer praised the games writing, describing it as "fantastic, brimming with wit and a fair amount of dark comedy". A writer for IndieStatik called it "one of the most genuinely funny, well-written games" they were played, comparing it to Grim Fandango and Monkey Island. Nick Tylwalk from Gamezebo found the game to be short but praised its replay value. Adam Smith from Rock, Paper, Shotgun said he would have loved the game if it came out for the Amiga, later saying it deserved cult classic status.

The visuals for the game was negatively received, with RPGFan's Luna Lee calling the graphics "poor". Matt Beaudette and Nick Tylwalk also pointed out the lack of moving graphics, with Tylwalk saying "the lack of actual moving graphics also undoubtedly will prove too stifling for some." Luna Lee also criticized the limited use of music in the game, finding it to be silent besides sound effects and music during battles.
