= Pocket Trains =

2013 video game

- Game logo
- Developer: NimbleBit
- Publisher: NimbleBit
- Platforms: iOS, Android
- Release: WW: September 15, 2013
- Genres: Train simulator, Business simulator
- Mode: Single-player

Pocket Trains is a business simulation video game developed by NimbleBit for iOS and Android. It was published on the App Store on September 15, 2013 for iOS.

== Gameplay ==
A screenshot depicting a 'Bluebell Steamer' train waiting at Rome station.

Similar to Pocket Planes, the game focuses on running a transportation network system. The player starts with small steam trains of limited fuel and speed that can carry a small amount of cargo, and/or passenger cars. Earning coins from delivering jobs, the player slowly expands their rail network to include more cities and better trains. Like Pocket Planes, Pocket Trains uses real cities around the world and has quasi-realistic costs to purchase tracks and cities relative to the real world.

"Jobs" are single delivery tasks offered to trains. They are priced based on the distance from the originating station to the destination. Although multiple jobs may be headed to the same destination, different types of jobs may be more profitable than others. Jobs can be held at stations for transfer between trains or for later transport.

Certain jobs involve the delivery of "Crates", which are placed into the player's inventory upon delivery. Crates can be opened using the in-game secondary currency, Bux, and contain parts for trains that can be built once all the necessary components are achieved. Players can also earn Bux by completing special jobs.

Bux can be used to buy coins, allow more jobs to be held in yards at stations, speed up trains, and open crates. Bux can also be purchased with money.

Crates, coins and Bux can also be received by watching the train travel screen, and tapping on the resources as they pass by.

== Reception ==
Pocket Trains

Aggregate score
Aggregator	Score
Metacritic	76/100

Review scores
Publication	Score
Edge	5/10
Touch Arcade	4.5/5
Gamezebo	4.5/5
Pocket Gamer	7/10

Pocket Trains has been received well by critics. Metacritic described it as a "fun ride", giving it an aggregated score of 76/100. Toucharcade rated it 4.5 out of 5 stars, saying it was "yet another fun title" when comparing it to Pocket Planes. Gamezebo also rated it 4.5/5 stating it was a "charming, highly addictive" game. Pocket Gamer rated it 7/10, calling it an "impressively simple time-waster", but noting that it "is a little too similar to its airborne predecessor". However, Edge Online rated it 5/10, complaining "expansion is painfully slow".

== See also ==
- Pocket Frogs
