= Pocket Planes =

2012 video game

- Game logo
- Developer: NimbleBit
- Publisher: NimbleBit
- Platforms: iOS; Android
- Release: iOS; June 16, 2012; Android; September 22, 2012
- Genre: Simulation
- Mode: Single player

Pocket Planes is a business simulation video game developed by NimbleBit for iOS. It was initially released on June 14, 2012. In October 2012, the game became available on the Mac App Store. An Android version, ported and published by Mobage, was released on September 22, 2012. The game was removed on September 24, 2015 from the Google Play Store, however was re-released March 17, 2022. The game is still available on iOS App Store in selected regions (U.S., Canada, Australia). An update to the iOS version is also planned and will see the game available again in all countries.

== Gameplay ==
A screenshot depicting a plane that has landed at an airport.

In Pocket Planes, players assume the role of an airline CEO. Starting with a few airports and small planes, players transport small amounts of cargo and passengers short distances. As they slowly gain profit from their flights, they then build more airports, buy better planes, and expand their airline internationally.

A formula determines how much profit will be earned from a flight, depending on the distance, speed and the weight of the plane used on the route. Filling a plane with cargo or passengers going to the same destination will net a 25% bonus on each item. Players can also complete events that involve flying special items and people to a designated destination. After completing these events, players are awarded Bux, which are used to buy planes and purchase other perks such as upgrades and the ability to speed up flights.

== Android version ==
On September 24, 2015, the company that ported the game to Android, Mobage, shut down their game servers for Pocket Planes and other NimbleBit games including Pocket Frogs and Tiny Tower, and subsequently removed these downloads from the Google Play Store.

The other games have since been relaunched on the Google Play Store by NimbleBit themselves, and on April 19, 2021, it was announced that a new Android port of Pocket Planes was in development.

On March 17, 2022, NimbleBit re-released Pocket Planes to the Google Play Store.

== Reception ==
Reception

Aggregate score
Aggregator	Score
Metacritic	78/100

Review scores
Publication	Score
Pocket Gamer	9/10
TouchArcade	5/5
Gamezebo	4.5/5

The game was viewed favorably by reviewers. It holds a 78/100 score on the aggregate Metacritic, categorizing it as "Generally favorable reviews" based on 17 reviewers. Gamezebo rated it 4.5 stars out of 5, stating "NimbleBit has once again dropped you in the middle of a universe that feels like it was built just for you, and filled it with a deeper, more compelling mission".

However, Ryan Rigney of Wired wrote that the player's success did not correlate with skill, and criticizes it for a lack of compelling gameplay.

== See also ==
- Pocket Frogs
- Pocket Trains
- Tiny Tower
