= EXceed =

eXceed
- Cover of the original eXceed
- Genre: Scrolling shooter
- Developer: Tennen-sozai (formerly FLAT)
- Publishers: JP: Tennen-sozai; JP: Hangame; WW: Nyu Media
- Creator: Kyoichi Teratsuki
- Composers: Shibayan, Saitama Saisyu Heiki
- Platform: Windows
- First release: eXceed; December 30, 2005 (Comiket 69)
- Latest release: eXceed3rd JADE PENETRATE BLACK PACKAGE; December 30, 2009 (Comiket 77)

eXceed (イクシード, Ikusīdo) is a series of Japanese vertically scrolling shooters developed by the dōjin circle Tennen-sozai (天然素材) (formerly FLAT). The first game, eXceed, was released in 2005, and the latest game, eXceed3rd JADE PENETRATE BLACK PACKAGE, was released in 2009. The series is localized into English and published by Nyu Media.

== eXceed - Gun Bullet Children ==
The first game of the series. It was released at the Comiket 69 in December 2005. Three characters are playable, Chinatsu Kagaya (加賀谷千夏), Sowel Devosiana (ソウェル・デヴォシアナ) and Miyabi Housen (邦泉雅). A remake version has never been released.

== eXceed 2nd - Vampire REX ==
The second game of the series. It was released in 2006. Only one character is playable, Ria File (リア・ファイル). The eXceed 2nd -Vampire REX is a remake version of the second game, developed by Tennen-sozai (branched from FLAT) in December 2007.

== eXceed 3rd - JADE PENETRATE - ==
The third game of the series. It was developed by Tennen-sozai and released in August 2007. Only one character is playable, Rayne Lindwurm (レイン・リンドブルム). Some famous Japanese voice actresses worked on this game; Yukari Tamura, Nana Mizuki and Shizuka Itō. Sound tracks were composed by the dōjin circle Saitama Saishu Heiki (埼玉最終兵器). The eXceed 3rd -JADE PENETRATE BLACK PACKAGE is an expanded version of the third game, released in December 2009. In 2015, it was also released on an online store by Hangame.
