= Tiny Tower =

2011 video game

- App icon
- Developer: NimbleBit
- Publisher: NimbleBit
- Platforms: iOS, Android
- Release: iOS: June 23, 2011; Android: November 16, 2011; Android re-release: May 25, 2016
- Genres: Simulation, incremental
- Mode: Single-player

Tiny Tower is an incremental business simulation video game developed and published by the American indie studio NimbleBit. In it, the player manages a multi-story building with virtual people termed "bitizens" and must build floors to attract residents and generate more revenue. It was released on June 23, 2011, for iOS devices, followed by a version for Android on November 16, 2011. While it was shut down in September 2015, Tiny Tower was re-released with revamped gameplay in May 2016 and has since inspired spin-off games themed after other fictional properties.

Tiny Tower garnered a positive reception for its gameplay. It was selected as iPhone Game of the Year by Apple in 2011.

== Gameplay ==
=== Bitizens ===
The lowest floor of the tower, a lobby, has an elevator, where bitizens can randomly appear. They will have a speech bubble above their head, with a number denoting which floor they would like to be taken to. If they are taken to a residential floor which has not been fully occupied, they will automatically inhabit that floor and become a resident of the tower. If they are taken to a floor that is stocking or under construction, one minute will be reduced from the remaining time.

Each bitizen has a skill level out of 9 for each category of commercial floor, showing how good they are at each type of trade. This encourages the user to tailor each bitizen to a floor they are most suited to. Each bitizen has a dream job, and the player is rewarded five "Tower Bux" for placing them in that job. Bitizens sometimes post on the "BitBook" telling the player how happy they are with their current job.

Occasionally, the player may be tasked to complete a mission, like search for a specific object or bitizen. This may be because the bitizen, for example, had ordered "some theater tickets" and that they "needed to be delivered to [name]". The game might also task you with delivering some bitizen, like “This tower is a number one tourist attraction, please deliver the tourists”. Every time a player accomplishes these tasks by tapping on the floor that the bitizen whom the player was looking for was on, they are rewarded "Tower Bux". Sometimes Bitizens will also grant "free money" such as, "Here's the rent, better late than never!"

In-game screenshot showing four floors of a player's tower and their inhabitants.

=== Floors ===
The tower grows by constructing floors, which can be either residential or commercial. Residential floors house bitizens. Bitizens are chosen to work at a floor in the tower, and are otherwise considered unemployed. Commercial floors sell products, which are automatically sold, even while the player is away. There are five types of commercial floors: Food, Retail, Service, Recreational, and Creative.

Each floor is decorated to resemble its real-life counterpart. Up to three products may be sold at a single floor, one per employed bitizen. All these products follow the theme of the business. With every floor, construction time is parallel to real world-time; construction time will increase as the tower gets taller. However, special VIPs can be used to speed this time up, or the player can speed it up with "Tower Bux".

=== Currency ===
In the game, there are two types of currency: coins and Tower Bux. Coins are used for the majority of purchases, often the most simple. Tower Bux are used for special functions, such as speeding up processes which would otherwise involve a waiting period. Tower Bux are not as common as coins are, and only appear randomly through active game play, or when a user purchases them with real money. Coins, on the other hand, are earned regardless of whether the player is playing or not.

=== VIPs ===
Apart from just the ordinary bitizens, there are also special bitizens called VIPs, who randomly appear in the elevator during gameplay. Originally, players were forced to use a VIP as soon as it arrived, but now up to five VIPs can be stored in the lobby at any one time, and they can kept for any period of time. VIPs have special abilities such as reducing the time taken for stocking and construction, or attracting extra customers.

- A Big Spender VIP will select one item in the shop at random, and buy out the entire stock. They typically wear a green ensemble.
- A Celebrity VIP makes the first listed employee that works in the shop and is not in their dream job make that job his or her dream job. They wear a pink dress and sunglasses.
- A Construction Worker VIP will knock 3 hours off the construction time of the floor they are sent to. They wear a safety orange outfit and a yellow hat.
- A Delivery Man VIP will fully stock the floor in any shop the player chooses. They appear in an all-brown outfit.
- A Real Estate VIP is taken to a residential floor. They will move a bitizen into each open bed on that floor, adding up to a full room of five bitizens to the player's tower. They wear blue suits.

== Release ==
On February 7, 2012, NimbleBit announced that Tiny Tower had reached 10 million total downloads. Tiny Tower was released on Google Play on May 25, 2016.

== Spin-offs ==
NimbleBit has released spin-offs of Tiny Tower that mirror the original gameplay with themed characters and graphics, including Tiny Death Star (2013), Tiny Tower Vegas (2014), and Lego Tower (2019). Themed after the Star Wars franchise, Tiny Death Star tasks the player to expand a Death Star to collect money. In Tiny Tower Vegas, a Las Vegas-themed version, the player earns an additional in-game currency called Poker Chips that can be spent in casinos. In Lego Tower, a collaboration between NimbleBit and The Lego Group, bitizens are minifigures, and buildings are references to Lego sets from various franchises.

== Reception ==
Reception

Aggregate score
Aggregator	Score
Metacritic	82/100

Review scores
Publication	Score
Edge	8/10
Eurogamer	6/10
AppGamer	10/10
Pocket Gamer	7/10
TouchArcade	5/5
Gamezebo	4.5/5

Award
Publication	Award
Apple	2011 iPhone Game of the Year

On Metacritic, Tiny Tower received a "generally positive" score of 82/100.

Several reviewers commented on the addictive nature of the game; Edge stated that "returning after half a day feels like a jackpot", while Eurogamer described it as "curiously addictive". AppGamer went as far as to say that it "will take over your waking life".

Microtransactions are present in the game; small payments allowing users to purchase in-game currency which can speed the player's progress. They brought mixed response from reviewers, with Eurogamer saying "as it is, it reminds me of all the reasons I despise micro transactions". Other reviewers had less negative comments on these payments. Edge wrote that "Tiny Tower isn't defined by microtransactions: there's nothing that can't be done, given enough time", noting however that "forking out for a single 100 Bux bundle makes the first stretch so much more pleasant... it's hard to resist."

Apple announced the game as their iPhone Game of the Year in 2011.

== See also ==
- SimTower
