= List of video games released in 2013 =

The following is a comprehensive index of all games released in 2013, sorted chronologically by release date, and divided by quarter. Information regarding developer, publisher, operating system, genre, and type of release is provided where available

For a summary of 2013 in video games as a whole, see 2013 in video games.

== Legend ==
Video game platforms
3DS	Nintendo 3DS, 3DS Virtual Console, iQue 3DS	DROID	Android	DS	Nintendo DS, DSiWare, iQue DS
iOS	iOS, iPhone, iPod, iPadOS, iPad, visionOS, Apple Vision Pro	LIN	Linux, SteamOS	Shield	Nvidia Shield
OSX	macOS	OUYA	Ouya	PS2	PlayStation 2
PS3	PlayStation 3	PS4	PlayStation 4	PSN	PlayStation Network
PSP	PlayStation Portable	PSV	PlayStation Vita	WEB	Browser game
Wii	Wii, WiiWare, Wii Virtual Console	WiiU	Wii U, WiiU Virtual Console	WIN	Windows, all versions Windows 95 and up
WP	Windows Phone	XB360	Xbox 360, Xbox 360 Live Arcade	XBO	Xbox One

Types of releases
Compilation	A compilation, anthology or collection of several titles, usually (but not always) belonging to the same series
Early access	A game launched in early access is unfinished and thus might contain bugs and glitches or have some of the content missing
Episodic	An episodic video game that is released in batches over a period of time
Expansion	A large-scale DLC to an already existing game that adds new story, areas and additions and/or changes to the game's mechanics
Full release	A full release of a game that launched in early access first
Limited	A special release (often called "Limited" or "Collector's Edition") with bonus collector's material. Often provided to people who pre-order a game
Port	The game first appeared on a different platform and a port was made. The game is like the original, with few or no differences
Remake	The game is an enhanced remake of an original, made using a new engine and/or assets and thus containing completely new sound, graphics and possibly changes to the story and/or gameplay
Remaster	The game is a remaster of an original, released on the same or different platform, with (usually minor) changes to graphics, sound and/or gameplay
Rerelease	The game was re-released on the same platform with no or only minor changes

Video game genres
Action	Action game	Action RPG	Action role-playing game	Action-adventure	Action-adventure game
Adventure	Adventure game	Brawler	Beat 'em up	Business sim	Business simulation game
City builder	City-building game	Digital tabletop	Digital tabletop game	Endless runner	Endless runner
Fighting	Fighting game	Fitness	Fitness game	FPS	First-person shooter
Graphic adventure	Graphic adventure	Hack and slash	Hack and slash	Interactive film	Interactive film
Life sim	Life simulation game	Metroidvania	Metroidvania	MMO	Massively multiplayer online game
MOBA	Multiplayer online battle arena	Music	Music video game	Party	Party video game
PCA	Point-and-click adventure	Platformer	Platformer	Puzzle	Puzzle video game
Puzzle-platformer	Puzzle-platformer	Racing	Racing video game	Rhythm	Rhythm game
Roguelike	Roguelike, Roguelite	RPG	Role-playing video game	RTS	Real-time strategy
Sandbox	Sandbox game	Shoot 'em up	Shoot 'em up	Shooter	Shooter game
Simulation	Simulation video game	Sports	Sports video game	Stealth	Stealth game
Strategy	Strategy video game	Survival	Survival game	Survival horror	Survival horror
Tactical RPG	Tactical role-playing game	Tactical shooter	Tactical shooter	TBS	Turn-based strategy
TBT	Turn-based tactics	Tower defense	Tower defense	TPS	Third-person shooter
Vehicle sim	Vehicle simulation game	Vehicular combat	Vehicular combat game	Visual novel	Visual novel

== List ==
=== January–March ===
Release date	Title	Platform	Type	Genre	Developer	Publisher	Ref.
January 2	Retro City Rampage	XB360		Action-adventure			
January 3	Code of Princess	3DS		Action RPG, Hack and slash			
January 3	Gunman Clive	3DS, iOS		Platformer	Hörberg Productions	Hörberg Productions	
January 3	Unchained Blades	3DS		RPG			
January 7	Kentucky Route Zero: Act I	WIN, OSX, LIN		PCA			
January 8	Anarchy Reigns	PS3, XB360		Brawler, Hack and slash			
January 8	Earth Defense Force 2017	PSV		TPS			
January 9	Haunt the House: Terrortown	PSV		Action, Puzzle			
January 10	Fieldrunners 2	WIN		Tower defense			
January 10	Joe Danger	iOS		Racing, Platformer			
January 15	Corpse Party: Book of Shadows	PSP		Survival horror			
January 15	DmC: Devil May Cry	PS3, XB360	Original	Action-adventure, Hack and slash			
January 17	Final Fantasy All the Bravest	iOS					
January 17	Temple Run 2	iOS		Endless runner			
January 17	Tokyo Crash Mobs	3DS		Puzzle			
January 19	Super Hexagon	DROID		Action			
January 22	The Cave	PSN, WiiU		Puzzle-platformer, Adventure			
January 22	Mad Dog McCree	PSN		Interactive film, light gun shooter			
January 22	Ni no Kuni: Wrath of the White Witch	PS3		RPG			
January 23	Strike Suit Zero	WIN		Vehicular combat (spaceship)			
January 23	The Cave	XB360		Puzzle-platformer, Adventure			
January 24	The Cave	WIN, OSX		Puzzle-platformer, Adventure			
January 24	Might & Magic: Clash of Heroes	iOS		Puzzle, Adventure, RPG			
January 24	Temple Run 2	DROID		Endless runner			
January 25	Ace Combat: Assault Horizon	WIN		Vehicular combat (plane)			
January 25	DmC: Devil May Cry	WIN	Port	Action-adventure, Hack and slash			
January 28	Tower of Saviors	iOS		Puzzle, RPG			
January 29	Dungeonland	WIN		MOBA			
January 29	Grand Theft Auto: Vice City	PSN		Action-adventure			
January 29	Hitman: HD Trilogy	PS3, XB360	Compilation	Stealth			
January 29	Let's Fish! Hooked On	PSV		Sports			
January 29	Tower of Saviors	DROID		Puzzle, RPG			
January 30	Proteus	WIN		Adventure			
January 30	Skulls of the Shogun	XB360, WIN		TBT			
January 30	Wizardry Online	WIN		MMO, RPG			
January 31	Antichamber	WIN		Puzzle-platformer			
January 31	Little Inferno	iOS		Puzzle			
January 31	Puddle	WiiU		Puzzle-platformer			
January 31	Sonic & All-Stars Racing Transformed	WIN	Port	Racing			
January 31	Table Top Racing	iOS		Racing			
February 4	Fire Emblem Awakening	3DS		Tactical RPG			
February 5	Dead Space 3	WIN, PS3, XB360	Original	Survival horror, Action-adventure			
February 5	Fist of the North Star: Ken's Rage 2	PS3, XB360		Brawler			
February 5	Sly Cooper: Thieves in Time	PS3, PSV		Action-adventure, Stealth			
February 7	After Burner Climax	iOS		Vehicular combat (plane), Shoot 'em up			
February 7	Fist of the North Star: Ken's Rage 2	WiiU		Brawler			
February 8	We Sing 80s	Wii		Music			
February 10	Brain Age: Concentration Training	3DS		Puzzle, Educational			
February 12	Alien Breed	PSN, PSV		Run and gun			
February 12	Aliens: Colonial Marines	WIN, PS3, XB360		FPS			
February 12	Mini Ninjas Mobile	iOS		Action-adventure			
February 12	Omerta – City of Gangsters	WIN, XB360		Simulation			
February 12	Persona 4 Arena	PSN		Endless runner			
February 12	Pro Evolution Soccer 2013	3DS		Sports			
February 12	Sonic & All-Stars Racing Transformed	3DS	Port	Racing			
February 13	4 Pics 1 Word	iOS, DROID		Puzzle, Word			
February 14	Impire	WIN		Strategy			
February 19	Crysis 3	WIN, XB360, PS3	Original	FPS			
February 19	Generation of Chaos: Pandora's Reflection	PSP		Tactical RPG			
February 19	Hakuoki: Warriors of the Shinsengumi	PSP					
February 19	March of the Eagles	WIN		Grand strategy			
February 19	Metal Gear Rising: Revengeance	PS3, XB360	Original	Action, Hack and slash			
February 19	Urban Trial Freestyle	PS3, PSV		Racing			
February 21	Hell Yeah! Pocket Inferno	iOS					
February 21	Year Walk	iOS		Adventure			
February 22	Baldur's Gate: Enhanced Edition	OSX		RPG			
February 22	Old School RuneScape	WIN, OSX		MMO, RPG			
February 25	Krater	OSX		RPG			
February 26	Brütal Legend	WIN		Action-adventure, RTS			
February 26	Driftmoon	WIN, OSX, LIN		Adventure, RPG			
February 26	Dynasty Warriors 7: Empires	PSN		Hack and slash, Action			
February 26	Etrian Odyssey IV: Legends of the Titan	3DS		RPG, Dungeon crawl			
February 26	Ninja Gaiden Sigma 2 Plus	PSV		Hack and slash, Action-adventure			
February 26	Runner 2	WiiU, WIN, OSX, LIN		Platformer			
February 27	Asphalt 7: Heat	WP		Racing			
February 27	Runner 2	XB360		Platformer			
February 27	Phantom Breaker: Battle Grounds	XB360		Brawler			
February 27	Super Hexagon	LIN		Action			
February 28	Real Racing 3	iOS, DROID		Racing			
February 28	Retro City Rampage	Wii		Action-adventure			
February 28	Toy Story: Smash It!	DROID, iOS					
February 28	Sniper Elite: Nazi Zombie Army	WIN		Tactical shooter, Stealth			
March 1	Zombies	WIN		TBT			
March 5	The Amazing Spider-Man	WiiU		Action-adventure			
March 5	Atelier Ayesha: The Alchemist of Dusk	PS3		RPG			
March 5	Castlevania: Lords of Shadow – Mirror of Fate	3DS		Action-adventure, Hack and slash			
March 5	Fuel Overdose	PSN					
March 5	Major League Baseball 2K13	PS3, XB360		Sports			
March 5	MLB 13: The Show	PS3, PSV		Sports			
March 5	Naruto Shippuden: Ultimate Ninja Storm 3	XB360, PS3		Endless runner, Action			
March 5	Runner 2	PSN		Platformer			
March 5	Scribblenauts Collection	DS		Puzzle, Action			
March 5	The Sims 3: University Life	WIN, OSX		Life sim			
March 5	SimCity	WIN		City builder			
March 5	Tomb Raider	WIN, PS3, XB360	Original	Action-adventure			
March 7	Kersploosh!	3DS		Puzzle			
March 7	Liberation Maiden	iOS		RPG, Shoot 'em up, Simulation			
March 7	Rayman Jungle Run	WIN		Platformer			
March 7	Sonic Dash	iOS		Endless runner			
March 8	Sword of the Stars: The Pit	WIN		Roguelike			
March 12	Darkstalkers Resurrection	PSN		Fighting			
March 12	God of War: Ascension	PS3		Action-adventure, Hack and slash			
March 12	Sniper: Ghost Warrior 2	PS3, XB360, WIN		Tactical shooter, Stealth			
March 12	StarCraft II: Heart of the Swarm	WIN, OSX		RTS			
March 13	Darkstalkers Resurrection	XB360		Fighting			
March 14	A World of Keflings	WIN		City builder			
March 14	Chaos Rings II	DROID		RPG			
March 14	Go Home Dinosaurs!	WIN		Tower defense			
March 14	Ridiculous Fishing	iOS		Action, Sports			
March 14	Slam Bolt Scrappers	WIN		Puzzle, Action			
March 14	Super Stickman Golf 2	iOS					
March 18	Battle High 2	WIN					
March 18	Lego City Undercover	WiiU		Action-adventure			
March 18	Monster Loves You!	WIN		Visual novel			
March 19	The Croods: Prehistoric Party!	WiiU, Wii, 3DS, DS					
March 19	Gears of War: Judgment	XB360		TPS			
March 19	Hotline Miami	OSX		Shoot 'em up			
March 19	Monster Hunter 3 Ultimate	WiiU, 3DS		Action RPG			
March 19	Need for Speed: Most Wanted	WiiU		Racing			
March 19	The Walking Dead: Survival Instinct	PS3, XB360, WIN, WiiU		FPS			
March 20	Alien Spidy	WIN, XB360		Platformer			
March 20	Duke Nukem 3D: Megaton Edition	WIN		FPS			
March 20	Giana Sisters: Twisted Dreams	XB360		Puzzle-platformer			
March 20	Kerbal Space Program	WIN, OSX, LIN		Vehicle sim (spaceship)			
March 20	Retro/Grade	WIN		Rhythm, Shoot 'em up			
March 20	Shoot Many Robots	DROID		Shooter			
March 21	Hyperdimension Neptunia Victory	PS3		RPG			
March 21	Trials Evolution: Gold Edition	WIN		Platformer, Racing			
March 21	Zen Pinball 2	WiiU		Pinball			
March 22	Dead or Alive 5 Plus	PSV		Endless runner			
March 22	Resident Evil 6	WIN	Port	Action-adventure, TPS			
March 24	Luigi's Mansion: Dark Moon	3DS		Action-adventure			
March 24	Pokémon Mystery Dungeon: Gates to Infinity	3DS		Roguelike			
March 26	Army of Two: The Devil's Cartel	PS3, XB360		TPS			
March 26	BioShock Infinite	PS3, XB360, WIN	Original	FPS			
March 26	Final Fantasy XI: Seekers of Adoulin	WIN, XB360	Expansion	MMO, RPG			
March 26	Machinarium	PSV		Graphic adventure			
March 26	Slender: The Arrival	WIN		Survival horror			
March 26	Terraria	PSN		Action-adventure, Sandbox			
March 26	Tiger Woods PGA Tour 14	PS3, XB360		Sports			
March 27	Saturday Morning RPG	OUYA		RPG			
March 27	Temple Run	WP		Endless runner			
March 27	Terraria	XB360		Action-adventure, Sandbox			
March 28	Canabalt HD	OUYA		Endless runner			
March 28	Final Fantasy V	iOS	Port	RPG			
March 28	HarmoKnight	3DS		Rhythm, Platformer			
March 28	Magicka: Wizards of the Square Tablet	iOS		Action-adventure			
March 28	Ms. Splosion Man	iOS		Platformer			
March 28	Nimble Quest	iOS		Action RPG			
March 28	Race Driver: Grid	OSX		Racing			
March 28	Tactical Intervention	WIN		FPS			
March 28	Wizorb	OUYA		Breakout clone			

=== April–June ===
Release date	Title	Platform	Type	Genre	Developer	Publisher	Ref.
April 2	Cities in Motion 2	WIN, OSX		Business sim			
April 2	Defiance	WIN, PS3, XB360		TPS, Action RPG			
April 2	Duke Nukem II	iOS		Platformer			
April 2	Grand Theft Auto: Liberty City Stories	PSN		Action-adventure			
April 2	Grand Theft Auto: Vice City Stories	PSN		Action-adventure			
April 2	Ninja Gaiden 3: Razor's Edge	PS3, XB360		Action-adventure, Hack and slash			
April 3	A͈L͈P͈H͈A͈B͈E͈T͈	WIN, OSX, LIN					
April 3	BattleBlock Theater	XB360		Platformer			
April 3	Injustice: Gods Among Us	iOS		Fighting			
April 3	Ms. Splosion Man	WIN		Platformer			
April 4	Evoland	WIN		Action-adventure, RPG			
April 4	Sonic & Sega All-Stars Racing	OSX	Port	Racing			
April 4	Toki Tori 2	WiiU		Puzzle-platformer, Metroidvania			
April 5	Double Dragon II: Wander of the Dragons	XB360		Brawler			
April 5	Red Orchestra: Ostfront 41-45	OSX		Tactical shooter, FPS			
April 9	Age of Empires II: HD Edition	WIN		RTS			
April 9	Guacamelee!	PSN, PSV		Metroidvania, Platformer, Brawler			
April 9	Worms 2: Armageddon	DROID		Artillery, Strategy			
April 10	Age of Wushu	WIN		Action, MMO, RPG			
April 10	Modern Combat 4: Zero Hour	WP		FPS			
April 10	Motocross Madness	XB360		Vehicle sim, Racing			
April 10	ShootMania Storm	WIN		FPS			
April 11	Final Fantasy III	OUYA	Port	RPG			
April 11	Gemini Rue	iOS		Graphic adventure			
April 14	Star Wars: The Old Republic - Rise of the Hutt Cartel	WIN		MMO, RPG			
April 15	Little Inferno	OSX		Puzzle			
April 16	Darkfall Unholy Wars	WIN		MMO, RPG			
April 16	Dragon Fantasy Book I	PS3, PSV		RPG			
April 16	Injustice: Gods Among Us	WiiU, PS3, XB360		Fighting			
April 16	Pandora's Tower	Wii		Action RPG			
April 16	Shin Megami Tensei: Devil Summoner: Soul Hackers	3DS		RPG			
April 17	Sacred Citadel	WIN, PSN, XB360		Action, Brawler			
April 18	Cut the Rope: Time Travel	iOS		Puzzle			
April 18	Papo & Yo	WIN		Adventure, Puzzle			
April 18	Super Little Acorns 3D Turbo	3DS					
April 19	God Mode	WIN, XB360		TPS			
April 19	Surgeon Simulator 2013	WIN		Simulation			
April 19	We Sing UK Hits	Wii		Music			
April 20	No One Has to Die	WEB		Puzzle			
April 21	Lego City Undercover: The Chase Begins	3DS		Action-adventure			
April 23	Black Rock Shooter: The Game	PSP		Action RPG			
April 23	Dead Island: Riptide	WIN, PS3, XB360		Action RPG, Survival horror			
April 23	Don't Starve	WIN		Survival			
April 23	Dragon's Dogma: Dark Arisen	PS3, XB360		Action RPG, Hack and slash			
April 23	God Mode	PSN		TPS			
April 23	Guilty Gear XX: Λ Core Plus R	PSV		Fighting			
April 23	Star Trek	WIN, PS3, XB360		Action-adventure, TPS			
April 23	Thomas Was Alone	PS3, PSV		Puzzle-platformer			
April 24	Dyad	WIN		Racing, Puzzle, Shooter, Music			
April 24	Fieldrunners 2	DROID		Tower defense			
April 24	Kairo	WIN, OSX, LIN, iOS, DROID		Adventure			
April 24	Monaco: What's Yours is Mine	WIN		Stealth, Action	Pocketwatch Games	Pocketwatch Games	
April 24	Poker Night 2	XB360		Digital tabletop			
April 25	Gun Commando	iOS					
April 25	Iron Man 3: The Official Game	iOS		Endless runner			
April 25	Mega Man 4	3DS		Action, Platformer			
April 25	The House of the Dead: Overkill - Director's Cut	iOS		Shoot 'em up (rail)			
April 25	XCOM: Enemy Unknown	OSX		TBT, Tactical RPG			
April 26	Mars: War Logs	WIN		Action RPG			
April 26	Poker Night 2	WIN, OSX		Digital tabletop			
April 29	Stealth Bastard Deluxe	OSX, LIN		Platformer, Stealth			
April 29	Zack Zero	WIN		Platformer, Adventure			
April 30	Deadly Premonition: Director's Cut	PS3		Survival horror			
April 30	Dots	iOS					
April 30	Far Cry 3: Blood Dragon	PSN		FPS			
April 30	Katamari Damacy	PSN		Puzzle, Action			
April 30	Poker Night 2	PSN		Digital tabletop			
April 30	Soul Sacrifice	PSV		Action RPG			
April 30	Thomas Was Alone	PSN, PSV		Puzzle-platformer			
April 30	Zeno Clash II	WIN		Action RPG, Brawler			
May 1	Far Cry 3: Blood Dragon	WIN, XB360		FPS			
May 1	Fez	WIN		Puzzle-platformer			
May 1	Ragnarok Online 2: Legend of the Second	WIN		MMO, RPG			
May 2	Kung Fu Rabbit	WiiU		Platformer			
May 2	Might & Magic Heroes VI: Shades of Darkness	WIN		TBS			
May 2	Zoombies: Animales de la Muerte	iOS		Shooter			
May 7	Fatal Frame II: Crimson Butterfly	PSN		Survival horror			
May 8	Doritos Crash Course 2	XB360		Platformer			
May 9	Go Home Dinosaurs!	iOS		Tower defense			
May 9	Mario and Donkey Kong: Minis on the Move	3DS		Puzzle			
May 10	Carmageddon	DROID		Vehicular combat, Racing			
May 10	Monaco: What's Yours is Mine	XB360		Stealth, Action			
May 14	Dust 514	PS3		FPS			
May 14	Jacob Jones and the Bigfoot Mystery	PSV		Puzzle, Adventure			
May 14	Manhunt	PSN		Stealth, Survival horror			
May 14	Metro: Last Light	WIN, PS3, XB360	Original	FPS, Survival horror			
May 14	Nancy Drew: Ghost of Thornton Hall	WIN, OSX		Adventure			
May 16	Mega Man 5	3DS	Port	Action, Platformer			
May 16	Sonic the Hedgehog	iOS, DROID	Remake	Platformer			
May 16	Swords & Soldiers 3D	3DS		RTS			
May 16	The Starship Damrey	3DS		Vehicle sim (tank), Survival horror, Life sim			
May 16	Turbo Racing League	iOS					
May 17	Dragon's Lair	WIN, OSX		Interactive film			
May 21	Fast & Furious: Showdown	WIN, PS3, XB360, WiiU, 3DS					
May 21	Lego Batman 2: DC Super Heroes	WiiU		Action-adventure			
May 21	Ratchet & Clank: Full Frontal Assault	PSV		Platformer, Tower defense			
May 21	Resident Evil: Revelations	WIN, PS3, XB360, WiiU		Survival horror			
May 22	Call of Juarez: Gunslinger	WIN, PSN, XB360	Original	FPS			
May 22	The Incredible Adventures of Van Helsing	WIN, XB360		Action RPG			
May 23	Poker Night 2	iOS		Digital tabletop			
May 24	Donkey Kong Country Returns 3D	3DS	Port	Platformer			
May 24	Flappy Bird	iOS					
May 24	Dust: An Elysian Tail	WIN		Action RPG, Hack and slash, Metroidvania			
May 24	Sniper Elite V2	WiiU		Tactical shooter, Stealth			
May 28	Fuse	PS3, XB360		TPS			
May 28	Grid 2	WIN, PS3, XB360		Racing			
May 29	Expeditions: Conquistador	WIN, OSX					
May 30	Mega Man X	WiiU	Port	Action, Platformer			
May 30	Phoenix Wright: Ace Attorney − Justice for All	iOS	Port	Adventure, Visual novel			
May 30	Phoenix Wright: Ace Attorney − Trials and Tribulations	iOS	Port	Adventure, Visual novel			
May 30	Star Wars: Knights of the Old Republic	iOS		RPG			
May 30	Stickets	iOS		Tile-matching			
May 30	The Denpa Men 2: Beyond the Waves	3DS		RPG			
May 30	The Legend of Zelda: Oracle of Seasons and Oracle of Ages	3DS		Action-adventure			
May 30	World War Z	iOS		FPS			
June 3	Final Fantasy IV	DROID	Port	RPG			
June 3	Gunpoint	WIN		Puzzle-platformer			
June 4	Class of Heroes 2	PSP, PSV		RPG			
June 4	Eve Online: Odyssey	WIN		Vehicle sim (spaceship), MMO, RPG			
June 4	Limbo	PSV		Puzzle-platformer			
June 4	Marvel Heroes	WIN, OSX		MMO, Action RPG			
June 4	Remember Me	WIN, PS3, XB360		Action-adventure			
June 4	The Elder Scrolls V Skyrim: Legendary Edition	WIN, PS3, XB360		Action RPG			
June 5	State of Decay	XB360		Action-adventure, Survival horror, Stealth			
June 6	Slydris	DROID		Puzzle			
June 6	SpongeBob Moves In	iOS		City builder			
June 9	Animal Crossing: New Leaf	3DS		Social sim			
June 10	Commander Keen in Keen Dreams	DROID	Port	Platformer			
June 10	Title Bout Championship Boxing	WIN, OSX, LIN		Sports			
June 11	Tekken Revolution	PS3		Fighting			
June 11	You Don't Know Jack	OUYA		Party	Jackbox Games	Jackbox Games	
June 12	N.O.V.A. 3	WP		Action-adventure, FPS			
June 12	Zeno Clash II	XB360		Action RPG, Brawler			
June 13	Mighty Switch Force! 2	3DS		Action, Puzzle-platformer			
June 13	Mutant Mudds Deluxe	WiiU		Platformer			
June 13	Picross e	3DS					
June 13	Rugby Challenge 2	WIN, PS3, XB360		Sports (rugby)			
June 13	Zoo Park	WIN, OSX					
June 14	The Last of Us	PS3	Original	Action-adventure, Survival horror			
June 18	Dungeons & Dragons: Chronicles of Mystara	XB360, PSN, WIN		Brawler, Action RPG			
June 18	Epic Mickey 2: The Power of Two	PSV		Action-adventure, Platformer			
June 20	Bugs vs. Tanks!	3DS		Vehicle sim (tank), Survival horror, Life sim			
June 20	Icebreaker: A Viking Voyage	iOS		Puzzle			
June 20	Magrunner: Dark Pulse	WIN		Action, Puzzle			
June 20	Max Payne 3	OSX		TPS			
June 20	Neverwinter	WIN		MMO, RPG			
June 20	New Super Luigi U	WiiU	Expansion	Platformer			
June 20	XCOM: Enemy Unknown	iOS		TBT, Tactical RPG			
June 23	Game & Wario	WiiU		Party			
June 24	Joe Danger	WIN		Racing, Platformer			
June 24	Joe Danger 2: The Movie	WIN		Racing, Platformer			
June 24	Ride to Hell: Retribution	WIN		Action-adventure			
June 25	Company of Heroes 2	WIN		RTS			
June 25	Deadpool	WIN, PS3, XB360		Action-adventure			
June 25	Hotline Miami	PSN, PSV		Shoot 'em up			
June 25	Muramasa Rebirth	PSV		Action RPG			
June 25	Project X Zone	3DS		Tactical RPG			
June 25	Ride to Hell: Retribution	PS3, XB360		Action-adventure			
June 25	Shadowgun	OUYA		TPS			
June 25	Super Crate Box	OUYA		Shoot 'em up			
June 25	The Pinball Arcade	OUYA		Pinball			
June 25	The Sims 3: Island Paradise	WIN, OSX		Life sim			
June 25	TowerFall	OUYA		Action			
June 26	Batman: Arkham City Lockdown	DROID		Action-adventure			
June 26	Spartacus Legends	PS3, XB360		Fighting			
June 27	Beast Boxing Turbo	OUYA					
June 27	BombSquad	OUYA					
June 27	Kokuga	3DS		Shoot 'em up			
June 27	Layton Brothers: Mystery Room	iOS, DROID		Adventure, Puzzle			
June 27	Legends of Dawn	WIN		RPG			
June 27	Leisure Suit Larry: Reloaded	WIN, OSX		PCA			
June 27	Might & Magic: Clash of Heroes	DROID		Puzzle, Adventure, RPG			
June 27	Rogue Legacy	WIN		Platformer, Roguelike, Metroidvania			
June 27	Samurai Shodown II	iOS, DROID		Fighting			
June 27	Urban Trial Freestyle	3DS		Racing			
June 28	Drakerider Chains Transcendent	iOS					
June 28	You and Me and Her: A Love Story	WIN		Visual novel			

=== July–September ===
Release date	Title	Platform	Type	Genre	Developer	Publisher	Ref.
July 2	Duke Nukem II	WIN		Platformer			
July 2	The Walking Dead: 400 Days	PS3		Graphic adventure			
July 3	Limbo	iOS		Puzzle-platformer			
July 3	Monaco: What's Yours is Mine	OSX		Stealth, Action			
July 3	Mortal Kombat	WIN		Fighting			
July 3	Napoleon: Total War	OSX		TBS, RTT			
July 3	The Walking Dead: 400 Days	WIN		Graphic adventure			
July 4	Dark	WIN		Stealth, Action RPG			
July 4	Final Fantasy VII	WIN	Port	RPG			
July 5	Capsized	XB360		Platformer, Run and gun, Metroidvania			
July 5	The Walking Dead: 400 Days	XB360		Graphic adventure			
July 8	Sonic the Hedgehog 4: Episode I	OUYA	Port	Platformer			
July 8	Sonic the Hedgehog 4: Episode II	OUYA	Port	Platformer			
July 9	Civilization V: Brave New World	WIN, OSX		TBS, 4X			
July 9	Dark	XB360		Stealth, Action RPG			
July 9	Dota 2	WIN		MOBA			
July 9	Metal Gear Solid: The Legacy Collection	PS3	Compilation	Action-adventure, Stealth			
July 9	NCAA Football 14	PS3, XB360		Sports (football)			
July 10	Crazy Taxi	DROID	Port	Racing, Action			
July 11	Deus Ex: The Fall	iOS		Action RPG, FPS, Stealth			
July 11	Sprinkle Islands	iOS, DROID		Puzzle			
July 11	Toki Tori 2+	WIN, OSX		Puzzle-platformer, Metroidvania			
July 11	The Walking Dead: 400 Days	iOS		Graphic adventure			
July 12	Pacific Rim: The Mobile Game	iOS		Fighting			
July 12	Pacific Rim: The Video Game	PS3, XB360		Fighting			
July 16	Alien Spidy	PSN		Platformer			
July 16	Dynasty Warriors 8	PS3, XB360		Hack and slash, Action			
July 16	Shin Megami Tensei IV	3DS		RPG			
July 16	Sine Mora	iOS		Shoot 'em up			
July 16	Time and Eternity	PS3		RPG			
July 16	Turbo: Super Stunt Squad	WiiU, Wii, PS3, XB360, 3DS, DS					
July 17	R.I.P.D. The Game	WIN, PS3, XB360		TPS			
July 18	Attack of the Friday Monsters!	3DS		Vehicular combat (tank), Survival horror, Life sim			
July 18	Dota 2	OSX, LIN		MOBA			
July 18	EarthBound	WiiU	Port	RPG			
July 18	Halo: Spartan Assault	WIN, WP		Shoot 'em up			
July 18	Shantae	3DS	Port	Platformer, Metroidvania			
July 18	Pac-Man Dash!	iOS		Endless runner			
July 22	Dropchord	WIN, OSX		Music, Puzzle			
July 23	Do Not Fall	PSN					
July 23	A Ride into the Mountains	iOS, DROID		Action			
July 23	Stealth Inc. – A Clone in the Dark	PSN, PSV		Platformer, Stealth			
July 23	The Smurfs 2	WiiU, Wii, PS3, XB360, DS					
July 23	Zeno Clash II	PSN		Action RPG, Brawler			
July 24	NASCAR The Game: Inside Line	WIN		Racing (sim)			
July 24	Ty the Tasmanian Tiger	WIN		Platformer			
July 25	Picross e2	3DS					
July 25	Prince of Persia: The Shadow and The Flame	iOS, DROID		Cinematic platformer			
July 25	Shadowrun Returns	WIN, OSX, iOS, DROID		Tactical RPG			
July 25	Tropico 4: Gold Edition	OSX		CMS, Government sim			
July 25	TurtleStrike	iOS, DROID		Strategy, TBT, TBS, Wargame			
July 26	Zeno Clash II	XB360		Action RPG, Brawler			
July 26	Mars: War Logs	XB360		Action RPG			
July 26	Princess Battles	WIN, LIN		Visual novel			
July 30	Cloudberry Kingdom	PSN		Platformer			
July 30	Narco Terror	PSN					
July 31	Cloudberry Kingdom	WIN, XB360		Platformer			
July 31	Dropchord	OUYA		Music, Puzzle			
July 31	Rise of the Triad	WIN		FPS			
July 31	Real Racing 3	Shield		Racing			
July 31	Sonic the Hedgehog 4: Episode II	Shield	Port	Platformer			
August 1	Bike Rider DX	3DS					
August 1	Cloudberry Kingdom	WiiU		Platformer			
August 1	Dropchord	iOS, DROID		Music, Puzzle			
August 1	Puddle	iOS		Puzzle-platformer			
August 1	Sonic the Hedgehog CD	OUYA	Port	Platformer			
August 3	The Drowning	iOS		FPS			
August 4	Pikmin 3	WiiU		RTS, Puzzle			
August 6	Disney's Planes	WiiU, Wii, 3DS, DS					
August 6	Dragon's Crown	PS3, PSV		Action RPG, Brawler			
August 6	Ibb and Obb	PSN		Puzzle-platformer			
August 6	Superfrog HD	PS3, PSV		Platformer			
August 6	Tales of Xillia	PS3		RPG			
August 6	Divinity: Dragon Commander	WIN		RTS, TBS, TPS, Government sim			
August 7	Brothers: A Tale of Two Sons	XB360		Adventure			
August 8	Guacamelee! Gold Edition	WIN		Metroidvania, Platformer, Brawler			
August 8	Mikey Hooks	iOS					
August 8	Papers, Please	WIN, OSX		Puzzle, Simulation			
August 8	Spelunky	WIN		Platformer, Roguelike			
August 8	SteamWorld Dig	3DS		Platformer, Action-adventure, Metroidvania			
August 11	Mario & Luigi: Dream Team	3DS		RPG			
August 13	Angry Birds Trilogy	WiiU, Wii	Compilation	Puzzle			
August 13	BreakQuest: Extra Evolution	PSV		Action, Breakout clone			
August 13	DuckTales: Remastered	PSN, WiiU, WIN	Remake	Action, Platformer			
August 13	Europa Universalis IV	WIN, OSX, LIN		Grand strategy			
August 13	Geometry Dash	DROID, iOS		Platformer			
August 13	Mars: War Logs	PSN		Action RPG			
August 13	Payday 2	WIN, PS3, XB360		FPS			
August 13	Phineas and Ferb: Quest for Cool Stuff	3DS, DS, Wii, WiiU, XB360		Platformer			
August 13	Sine Mora	OUYA		Shoot 'em up			
August 14	Charlie Murder	XB360		Action RPG, Brawler			
August 15	A-Men	PSV					
August 15	Barbie: Groom and Glam Pups	3DS					
August 15	Gone Home	WIN, OSX, LIN		Walking sim			
August 15	Heavy Fire: Black Arms	3DS		Shoot 'em up (rail)			
August 15	Plants vs. Zombies 2: It's About Time	iOS		Tower defense			
August 15	Space Hulk	WIN, OSX		TBT			
August 18	Disney Infinity	WiiU, Wii, PS3, XB360, 3DS		Action-adventure			
August 19	Race the Sun	WIN		Endless runner			
August 20	Divekick	WIN, PS3, PSV		Fighting			
August 20	Ms. Germinator	PS3, PSV					
August 20	Saints Row IV	WIN, PS3, XB360	Original	Action-adventure	Volition	Deep Silver	
August 20	The Bureau: XCOM Declassified	WIN, PS3, XB360		Tactical shooter			
August 20	Tom Clancy's Splinter Cell: Blacklist	WIN, PS3, XB360, WiiU	Original	Action-adventure, Stealth			
August 21	Flashback	XB360		Platformer			
August 22	Asphalt 7: Heat	WIN		Racing			
August 22	Asphalt 8: Airborne	iOS, DROID		Racing			
August 22	Skullgirls	WIN		Fighting			
August 23	Electronic Super Joy	WIN		Platformer			
August 26	He-Man: The Most Powerful Game	DROID		Action-adventure			
August 27	Castlevania: Lords of Shadow	WIN		Action-adventure, Hack and slash			
August 27	Final Fantasy XIV: A Realm Reborn	WIN, PS3	Full release	MMO, RPG			
August 27	Hatsune Miku: Project DIVA F	PS3		Rhythm			
August 27	Killer is Dead	PS3, XB360		Action, Hack and slash			
August 27	Lost Planet 3	WIN, PS3, XB360		TPS, Action-adventure			
August 27	Madden NFL 25	PS3, XB360		Sports			
August 27	Spelunky	PSN, PSV		Platformer, Roguelike			
August 28	Teenage Mutant Ninja Turtles: Out of the Shadows	WIN, XB360		Action-adventure			
August 29	868-HACK	iOS		Roguelike			
August 29	BioShock Infinite	OSX		FPS			
August 29	Guardians of Middle-earth	WIN		MOBA			
August 29	Pokémon Rumble U	WiiU		Action RPG			
August 29	SimCity	OSX		City builder			
August 29	Terraria	iOS		Action-adventure, Sandbox			
August 30	Arcania: The Complete Tale	PS3, XB360		Action RPG			
September 3	Brothers: A Tale of Two Sons	WIN, PSN		Adventure			
September 3	Castle of Illusion Starring Mickey Mouse HD Remake	PSN		Platformer			
September 3	Chaos Code	PSN		Fighting			
September 3	Dance Dance Revolution Hottest Party U	WiiU					
September 3	Diablo III	PS3, XB360		Action RPG, Hack and slash			
September 3	Dead or Alive 5 Ultimate	PS3, XB360		Fighting			
September 3	Rayman Legends	WIN, PS3, WiiU, XB360, PSV		Platformer			
September 3	Total War: Rome II	WIN		TBS, RTT			
September 3	One Piece: Pirate Warriors 2	PS3		Action-adventure, Brawler			
September 4	2013: Infected Wars	iOS		Horror, Shooter			
September 4	Castle of Illusion Starring Mickey Mouse HD Remake	WIN, XB360		Platformer			
September 4	Outlast	WIN		Survival horror			
September 5	Dungeons & Dragons: Chronicles of Mystara	WiiU		Brawler, Action RPG			
September 5	Giana Sisters: Twisted Dreams	WiiU		Puzzle-platformer			
September 5	TNT Racers	WiiU		Racing			
September 10	Amnesia: A Machine for Pigs	WIN, OSX, LIN		Survival horror			
September 10	Dragon Fantasy Book II	PS3, PSV					
September 10	Killzone: Mercenary	PSV		FPS			
September 10	Kingdom Hearts HD 1.5 Remix	PS3	Remaster	Action RPG			
September 10	Metro: Last Light	OSX		FPS, Survival horror			
September 10	NHL 14	PS3, XB360		Sports			
September 10	Puppeteer	PS3		Platformer			
September 11	DuckTales: Remastered	XB360	Port	Action, Platformer			
September 12	ARMA 3	WIN		Tactical shooter			
September 12	Superfrog HD	WIN		Platformer			
September 13	Terraria	DROID		Action-adventure, Sandbox			
September 13	The King of Fighters XIII	WIN	Port	Fighting			
September 13	Volgarr the Viking	WIN		Platformer			
September 15	The Wonderful 101	WiiU		Action-adventure, Hack and slash			
September 17	Grand Theft Auto V	PS3, XB360	Original	Action-adventure	Rockstar North	Rockstar Games	
September 17	MechWarrior Online	WIN		Vehicle sim			
September 18	Broken Sword: The Serpent's Curse	WIN, OSX, LIN, iOS		PCA			
September 18	Dragon's Prophet	WIN		MMO, RPG			
September 18	Foul Play	WIN, XB360		Brawler, Action-adventure			
September 18	Infinity Blade III	iOS		Action RPG			
September 18	Ironclad Tactics	WIN		Strategy			
September 18	The Lord of the Rings: War in the North	OSX		Action RPG, Hack and slash			
September 18	Urban Trial Freestyle	WIN		Racing			
September 19	Angry Birds Star Wars II	iOS, DROID, WP		Puzzle			
September 19	Hakuoki: Memories of the Shinsengumi	3DS					
September 19	Rage of the Gladiator	3DS		Fighting			
September 20	Marlow Briggs and the Mask of Death	WIN, XB360		Action-adventure, Hack and slash			
September 20	The Angry Video Game Nerd Adventures	WIN					
September 20	The Legend of Zelda: The Wind Waker HD	WiiU	Remaster	Action-adventure			
September 20	Hot Wheels: World's Best Driver	PS3		Racing			
September 23	FIFA 14	iOS, DROID		Sports			
September 24	Alien Rage	WIN		FPS			
September 24	Armored Core: Verdict Day	PS3, XB360		TPS, RTS			
September 24	Cloudy with a Chance of Meatballs 2	3DS, DS					
September 24	FIFA 14	WIN, PS3, XB360, Wii, PS2, PSV, 3DS, PSP		Sports			
September 24	Lone Survivor	PSN, PSV		Survival horror			
September 24	Pro Evolution Soccer 2014	WIN, PS3, XB360, PS2, 3DS, PSP		Sports			
September 24	Scribblenauts Unmasked: A DC Comics Adventure	WiiU, 3DS, WIN		Puzzle, Action			
September 24	The Mark of Kri	PSN		Action-adventure			
September 25	Ascend: Hand of Kul	XB360		RPG			
September 25	Day One: Garry's Incident	WIN		FPS, Survival horror, Survival			
September 25	Final Fantasy V	DROID	Port	RPG			
September 26	Shadow Warrior	WIN		FPS			
September 26	Shadowrun Returns	iOS, DROID		Tactical RPG			

=== October–December ===
Release date	Title	Platform	Type	Genre	Developer	Publisher	Ref.
October 1	Atelier Meruru Plus: The Apprentice of Arland	PSV		RPG			
October 1	Grand Theft Auto Online	PS3, XB360		Action-adventure			
October 1	Etrian Odyssey Untold: The Millennium Girl	3DS		RPG			
October 1	Flashback	PSN, WIN		Platformer			
October 1	NBA 2K14	PS3, XB360, WIN		Sports			
October 1	Painkiller: Hell & Damnation	XB360		FPS			
October 1	Rain	PSN		Adventure			
October 1	Rune Factory 4	3DS		RPG			
October 2	A.R.E.S.: Extinction Agenda	XB360		Action, Platformer			
October 3	Marvel Puzzle Quest	iOS		Puzzle			
October 3	Picross e3	3DS					
October 3	Agarest: Generations of War	WIN		Tactical RPG			
October 3	The Cave	iOS		Puzzle-platformer, Adventure			
October 3	Transport Tycoon	iOS, DROID		Business sim			
October 4	Bubsy 3D: Bubsy Visits the James Turrell Retrospective	WIN, OSX		Platformer, Art			
October 7	Hero of Many	OUYA		Action-adventure			
October 8	Beyond: Two Souls	PS3	Original	Interactive film, Action-adventure			
October 8	Disgaea D2: A Brighter Darkness	PS3		Tactical RPG			
October 8	F1 2013	WIN, PS3, XB360		Racing			
October 8	Just Dance 2014	Wii, WiiU, XB360, PS3		Music			
October 8	Mimpi	iOS		Adventure, Puzzle-platformer			
October 10	Costume Quest	iOS		RPG			
October 10	Hero Academy	DROID		TBT			
October 11	The Wolf Among Us: Episode 1 – Faith	WIN, XB360	Episodic	Graphic adventure			
October 12	Pokémon X and Y	3DS		RPG			
October 13	Skylanders: Swap Force	Wii, WiiU, XB360, PS3		RPG, Platformer			
October 15	Fist of Awesome	iOS, DROID, OUYA		Brawler			
October 15	The Wolf Among Us: Episode 1 – Faith	PSN	Port	Graphic adventure			
October 15	Valhalla Knights 3	PSV		RPG			
October 16	140	WIN, OSX, LIN		Platformer			
October 16	Rogue Legacy	OSX, LIN		Platformer, Roguelike, Metroidvania			
October 17	Device 6	iOS		Interactive fiction			
October 17	Mega Dead Pixel	iOS		Endless runner			
October 17	Mighty Switch Force! 2	WiiU		Action, Puzzle-platformer			
October 17	Saint Seiya: Brave Soldiers	PS3		Fighting			
October 17	Sega Superstars Tennis	OSX		Sports			
October 17	The Stanley Parable	WIN		Adventure			
October 18	Alien Rage	XB360		FPS			
October 21	Monaco	LIN		Stealth, Action			
October 21	Warface	WIN		FPS			
October 22	Alien Rage	PS3		FPS			
October 22	Beyblade Evolution	3DS					
October 22	Deus Ex: Human Revolution – Director's Cut	WiiU, WIN, PS3, XB360		Action RPG, FPS, Stealth			
October 22	Hometown Story	3DS		Simulation, RPG			
October 22	LEGO Marvel Super Heroes	WIN, WiiU, XB360, PS3, 3DS, DS		Action-adventure			
October 22	Magrunner: Dark Pulse	PSN		Action, Puzzle			
October 22	Nancy Drew: The Silent Spy	WIN, OSX		Adventure			
October 22	Naruto Shippuden: Ultimate Ninja Storm 3 Full Burst	WIN, PS3, XB360		Fighting, Action			
October 22	Nickelodeon Teenage Mutant Ninja Turtles	3DS, Wii, XB360					
October 22	Rocksmith 2014	WIN, OSX, PS3, XB360		Music			
October 22	SpongeBob SquarePants: Plankton's Robotic Revenge	WiiU, 3DS, XB360, PS3, Wii, DS		Action-adventure, Platformer, TPS			
October 22	The Sims 3: Into the Future	WIN					
October 23	Dead Trigger 2	DROID, iOS		FPS, Survival horror, Action RPG			
October 23	How to Survive	WIN, XB360		Action RPG, Survival horror, Survival			
October 23	Path of Exile	WIN		Action RPG, Hack and slash			
October 23	Plants vs. Zombies 2: It's About Time	DROID		Tower defense			
October 24	Monster High: 13 Wishes	3DS, DS, Wii, WiiU					
October 24	Phoenix Wright: Ace Attorney - Dual Destinies	3DS		Adventure, Visual novel			
October 25	Batman: Arkham Origins	WIN, PS3, XB360, WiiU	Original	Action-adventure			
October 25	Batman: Arkham Origins Blackgate	PSV, 3DS		Action-adventure, Brawler, Stealth, Metroidvania			
October 25	Castlevania: Lords of Shadow – Mirror of Fate HD	XB360	Rerelease	Action-adventure, Hack and slash			
October 25	Enslaved: Odyssey to the West: Premium Edition	WIN, PS3		Action-adventure			
October 25	FIFA Manager 14	WIN		Sports			
October 25	Magrunner: Dark Pulse	XB360		Action, Puzzle			
October 25	The Dark Eye: Demonicon	WIN		RPG			
October 25	Wii Party U	WiiU		Party			
October 29	Angry Birds Star Wars	PS3, XB360, Wii, WiiU, PSV, 3DS	Port	Puzzle			
October 29	Assassin's Creed IV: Black Flag	PS3, XB360, WiiU	Original	Action-adventure, Stealth			
October 29	Battlefield 4	WIN, XB360, PS3	Original	FPS			
October 29	Castlevania: Lords of Shadow – Mirror of Fate HD	PSN		Action-adventure, Hack and slash			
October 29	Deadly Premonition: The Director's Cut	WIN		Survival horror			
October 29	Doodle Jump Adventures	3DS, DS		Platformer			
October 29	Pac-Man and the Ghostly Adventures	WIN, PS3, XB360, WiiU					
October 29	Regular Show: Mordecai and Rigby in 8-Bit Land	3DS		Action-adventure, Platformer, Shoot 'em up			
October 29	Sonic Lost World	WiiU, 3DS		Action, Platformer			
October 29	The Typing of The Dead: Overkill	WIN		Shoot 'em up (rail)			
October 29	WWE 2K14	PS3, XB360		Sports			
October 31	Football Manager 2014	WIN, OSX, LIN		Sports			
October 31	Runner2	iOS		Platformer			
October 31	Sniper Elite: Nazi Zombie Army 2	WIN		Tactical shooter, Stealth			
November 1	Blood Knights	XB360		Action RPG			
November 1	Chucky: Slash & Dash	iOS		Endless runner			
November 1	Shadowgun	GS		TPS			
November 1	Wii Fit U	WiiU		Fitness			
November 5	Call of Duty: Ghosts	WIN, XB360, PS3, WiiU	Original	FPS			
November 5	Final Exam	WIN, PSN		Hack and slash, Shooter, Platformer			
November 5	How to Survive	PSN		Action RPG, Survival horror, Survival			
November 5	Metro: Last Light	LIN		FPS, Survival horror			
November 5	Pac-Man and the Ghostly Adventures	3DS		Platformer			
November 5	Pictlogica Final Fantasy	iOS					
November 5	State of Decay	WIN		Action-adventure, Survival horror, Stealth			
November 5	The Guided Fate Paradox	PS3		Roguelike, RPG			
November 5	Zumba Fitness: World Party	WiiU, Wii, XB360		Fitness			
November 7	Lego The Lord of the Rings	iOS		Action-adventure			
November 7	Octagon	iOS		Action			
November 7	Rayman Fiesta Run	iOS					
November 7	Spec Ops: The Line	OSX		TPS			
November 7	Toki Tori	WiiU		Puzzle-platformer			
November 8	Final Exam	XB360		Hack and slash, Shooter, Platformer			
November 8	Project Zomboid	WIN, macOS, LIN	Early Access	Survival, RPG			
November 8	Risk of Rain	WIN		Platformer			
November 12	Barbie Dreamhouse Party	3DS, DS, Wii, WiiU					
November 12	BioShock Infinite: Burial at Sea – Episode 1	WIN, OSX, PS3, XB360	Expansion	FPS, Stealth			
November 12	Book of Potions	PS3		AR			
November 12	Diggs Nightcrawler	PS3		Adventure			
November 12	Flower	PSV		Adventure, Art			
November 12	Frozen: Olaf's Quest	3DS, DS		Platformer			
November 12	Injustice: Gods Among Us – Ultimate Edition	WIN, PS3, XB360, PSV	Limited	Fighting			
November 12	Ratchet & Clank: Into the Nexus	PS3		Platformer, Action-adventure			
November 12	Walking with Dinosaurs	PS3		AR			
November 12	World of Warplanes	WIN		Action, MMO			
November 12	XCOM: Enemy Within	WIN, OSX, PS3, XB360		TBT			
November 13	Asphalt 8: Airborne	WIN, WP		Racing			
November 13	Jett Rocket II: The Wrath of Taikai	3DS		Platformer			
November 13	The King of Fighters '97	iOS, DROID	Port	Fighting			
November 14	Senran Kagura Burst	3DS					
November 14	Football Manager 2014	iOS, DROID		Sports			
November 14	My Talking Tom	iOS		Virtual pet			
November 14	Oceanhorn: Monster of Uncharted Seas	iOS		Action-adventure			
November 14	Stealth Inc: A Clone in the Dark	iOS		Platformer, Stealth			
November 15	Angry Birds Star Wars	PS4	Port	Puzzle			
November 15	Assassin's Creed IV: Black Flag	PS4	Port	Action-adventure, Stealth			
November 15	Battlefield 4	PS4	Port	FPS			
November 15	Call of Duty: Ghosts	PS4	Port	FPS			
November 15	Contrast	WIN, PS3, PS4, XB360		Puzzle-platformer			
November 15	DC Universe Online	PS4		MMO, Action			
November 15	Deadfall Adventures	WIN, XB360		FPS, Action-adventure			
November 15	FIFA 14	PS4		Sports			
November 15	Flower	PS4		Adventure, Art			
November 15	Injustice: Gods Among Us – Ultimate Edition	PS4	Limited	Fighting			
November 15	Just Dance 2014	PS4		Music			
November 15	Killzone: Shadow Fall	PS4		FPS			
November 15	Knack	PS4		Platformer, Brawler			
November 15	LEGO Marvel Super Heroes	PS4		Action-adventure			
November 15	Madden NFL 25	PS4		Sports			
November 15	Mario & Sonic at the Sochi 2014 Olympic Winter Games	WiiU		Sports, Party			
November 15	NBA 2K14	PS4		Sports			
November 15	Need for Speed: Rivals	PS4		Racing			
November 15	Resogun	PS4		Shoot 'em up			
November 15	Skylanders: Swap Force	PS4		RPG, Platformer			
November 15	Sound Shapes	PS4		Music, Platformer			
November 15	Super Motherload	PS4					
November 15	Trine 2: Complete Story	PS4		Puzzle-platformer, Action-adventure			
November 15	Warframe	PS4		Action RPG, TPS			
November 15	X Rebirth	WIN		Vehicular combat (spaceship)			
November 19	Assassin's Creed IV: Black Flag	WIN	Port	Action-adventure, Stealth			
November 19	BandFuse: Rock Legends	PS3, XB360		Music			
November 19	Deer Drive Legends	Wii		Sports			
November 19	Eve Online: Rubicon	WIN		Vehicle sim (spaceship), MMO, RPG			
November 19	NBA Live 14	PS4		Sports			
November 19	Need for Speed: Rivals	WIN, PS3, XB360		Racing			
November 19	Soulcalibur II HD Online	PS3		Fighting			
November 19	Stick it to the Man!	PS3		Adventure			
November 19	The Amazing Spider-Man	PSV		Action-adventure			
November 19	Young Justice: Legacy	WIN, PS3, XB360, 3DS		Action-adventure, Action RPG			
November 20	Bouboum	WIN, OSX, LIN		MMO, RTS			
November 20	Soulcalibur II HD Online	XB360		Fighting			
November 21	Castle of Illusion Starring Mickey Mouse	iOS		Platformer			
November 21	Demon Tribe	iOS					
November 21	Hunger Games: Catching Fire - Panem Run	iOS					
November 21	Injustice: Gods Among Us	DROID		Fighting			
November 21	Regular Show: Ghost Toasters	iOS					
November 21	The Mysterious Cities of Gold: Secret Paths	3DS, DROID, iOS, WiiU, WIN		Puzzle, Stealth			
November 22	Angry Birds Star Wars	XBO	Port	Puzzle			
November 22	Ashes Cricket 2013	WIN		Sports			
November 22	Assassin's Creed IV: Black Flag	XBO	Port	Action-adventure, Stealth			
November 22	Battlefield 4	XBO	Port	FPS			
November 22	Call of Duty: Ghosts	XBO	Port	FPS			
November 22	Crimson Dragon	XBO		Shoot 'em up (rail)			
November 22	Dead Rising 3	XBO		Action-adventure, Survival horror			
November 22	FIFA 14	XBO		Sports			
November 22	Fighter Within	XBO		Fighting			
November 22	Forza Motorsport 5	XBO		Racing			
November 22	Just Dance 2014	XBO		Music			
November 22	Killer Instinct	XBO		Fighting			
November 22	LEGO Marvel Super Heroes	XBO		Action-adventure			
November 22	LocoCycle	XBO		Racing, Vehicular combat			
November 22	Madden NFL 25	XBO		Sports			
November 22	Mario Party: Island Tour	3DS		Party			
November 22	NBA 2K14	XBO		Sports			
November 22	NBA Live 14	XBO		Sports			
November 22	Need for Speed: Rivals	XBO		Racing			
November 22	Powerstar Golf	XBO		Sports			
November 22	Ryse: Son of Rome	XBO		Action-adventure, Hack and slash			
November 22	Skylanders: Swap Force	XBO		RPG, Platformer			
November 22	Super Mario 3D World	WiiU		Platformer			
November 22	Tearaway	PSV		Platformer, Adventure			
November 22	Thousand Memories	iOS, DROID		RPG	Akatsuki Games	Akatsuki Games	
November 22	The Legend of Zelda: A Link Between Worlds	3DS		Action-adventure			
November 22	Zoo Tycoon	XBO		Business sim			
November 22	Zumba Fitness: World Party	XBO		Fitness			
November 25	M.U.L.E. Returns	iOS		TBS			
November 26	Sonic Dash	DROID		Endless runner			
November 26	Ys: Memories of Celceta	PSV		Action RPG			
November 26	Painkiller: Hell & Damnation	PS3		FPS			
November 27	Skulls of the Shogun	iOS		TBT			
November 28	3D Space Harrier	3DS		Shoot 'em up (rail)			
November 28	3D Super Hang-On	3DS		Racing			
December 3	The Bureau: XCOM Declassified	OSX		Tactical shooter			
December 3	The Cave	OUYA		Puzzle-platformer, Adventure			
December 3	Escape Plan	PS4		Puzzle			
December 3	Rainbow Moon	PSV		Tactical RPG			
December 3	Stick it to the Man!	PSV		Graphic adventure			
December 3	Tiny Brains	PS4					
December 4	Broken Sword: The Serpent's Curse – Episode 1	WIN, OSX, LIN	Episodic	PCA			
December 4	The Wolf Among Us: Episode 1 – Faith	iOS	Port	Graphic adventure			
December 5	3D Altered Beast	3DS		Brawler			
December 5	3D Sonic the Hedgehog	3DS		Platformer			
December 5	Assassin's Creed: Pirates	iOS, DROID					
December 5	Heroes of Dragon Age	iOS, DROID		RPG			
December 5	Space Hulk	iOS		TBT			
December 5	SteamWorld Dig	WIN		Platformer, Action-adventure, Metroidvania			
December 6	Gran Turismo 6	PS3		Racing (sim)			
December 9	Peggle 2	XBO		Puzzle			
December 10	Doki-Doki Universe	PS4, PSN, PSV		Adventure			
December 10	Sorcery Saga: Curse of the Great Curry God	PSV		RPG			
December 10	The Novelist	WIN, OSX, LIN					
December 11	Angry Birds Go!	iOS, DROID, WP		Racing			
December 11	Tiny Brains	WIN					
December 12	3D Ecco the Dolphin	3DS		Action-adventure			
December 12	3D Galaxy Force II	3DS		Shoot 'em up (rail)			
December 12	Grand Theft Auto: San Andreas 10 Year Anniversary Edition	iOS		Action-adventure			
December 12	Lego Star Wars: The Complete Saga	iOS		Action-adventure			
December 12	Rayman Origins	OSX	Port	Platformer			
December 12	RUSH	WiiU					
December 12	Sonic the Hedgehog 2	iOS, DROID	Remake	Platformer			
December 12	The Room 2	iOS					
December 12	Velocity Ultra	WIN		Shoot 'em up, Puzzle			
December 13	Stick it to the Man!	WIN, OSX		Graphic adventure			
December 13	Teslagrad	WIN, OSX, LIN		Puzzle-platformer			
December 17	Dementium II HD	WIN, OSX		FPS, Survival horror			
December 17	Eufloria HD	PSV	Remaster	RTS	Omni Systems	Omni Systems	
December 17	Flow	PS4, PSV		Life sim			
December 17	Furmins	PSV		Puzzle-platformer			
December 17	Minecraft	PSN	Port	Sandbox, Survival			
December 17	Mutant Mudds Deluxe	PSN, PSV		Platformer			
December 17	Ridge Racer Slipstream	iOS, DROID					
December 17	Runner 2	PSV		Platformer			
December 17	Terraria	PSV		Action-adventure, Sandbox			
December 17	The Walking Dead: Season Two: Episode 1 – All That Remains	WIN, OSX, PSN	Episodic	Graphic adventure			
December 17	Toki Tori	PSN		Puzzle-platformer			
December 17	Tomb Raider	iOS		Action-adventure			
December 18	Broken Sword: The Serpent's Curse – Episode 1	PSV		PCA			
December 18	Fightback	iOS					
December 18	Ratchet & Clank: Before the Nexus	iOS, DROID					
December 18	The Walking Dead: Season Two: Episode 1 – All That Remains	XB360, iOS	Port	Graphic adventure			
December 18	Wii Sports Club: Golf	WiiU		Sports			
December 19	3D Shinobi III: Return of the Ninja Master	3DS		Platformer			
December 19	3D Streets of Rage	3DS					
December 19	Colossatron: Massive World Threat	iOS					
December 19	Cut the Rope 2	iOS		Puzzle			
December 19	Grand Theft Auto: San Andreas 10 Year Anniversary Edition	DROID		Action-adventure			
December 19	Killing Floor: Calamity	OUYA					
December 19	Knytt Underground	WiiU		Adventure, Platformer			
December 19	Mimpi	DROID		Adventure, Puzzle-platformer			
December 19	République: Episode 1	iOS		Action-adventure, Stealth			
December 19	The Cave	DROID		Puzzle-platformer, Adventure			
December 19	The Stanley Parable	OSX	Port	Adventure			
December 20	Max: The Curse of Brotherhood	XBO		Puzzle-platformer			
December 20	Temple Run 2	WP		Endless runner			
December 24	Halo: Spartan Assault	XBO		Shoot 'em up (twin-stick)			
December 24	Zen Pinball 2	PS4		Pinball			
December 26	CastleStorm	WiiU		Tower defense			
December 29	Final Fantasy III	WP	Port	RPG			
December 31	Dr. Luigi	WiiU		Puzzle			
