= Cash Struck! =

- Presented by: Ebi Shankara
- Narrated by: Will Xavier
- Country of origin: Singapore
- Original language: English
- No. of episodes: 26

Production
- Executive producer: Julie Sim-Chew
- Producer: Lum Wai Loon
- Production location: Mediacorp TV Studio
- Running time: 60 minutes (including commercials)
- Production companies: Mediacorp; Endemol Shine Group

Original release
- Network: Mediacorp Channel 5
- Release: 6 February – 7 August 2017

Cash Struck! is a Singaporean television game show that premiered in 2017, involving contestants to identifying links to win cash money. The series is a collaboration with Mediacorp and Endemol Shine Group which ran for one season, and premiered on 6 February 2017. The show is hosted by actor Ebi Shankara.

== Gameplay ==
Teams, with contestants of two with a pre-related relationship, will solve a series of ten different word puzzles akin to the game board from Candy Crush Saga and 4 Pics 1 Word. Tokens ranging from 10 to 100 are displayed on the board and contain 10 images that displayed as a question and a number. Teams first picked a question number, after which it will display two images and a word, with some letters provided to the team. There is no time limit to answer. Teams must respond by saying "The link is..." before responding with a given answer. Correct links will cause the tokens to disappear and won a triple of the amount of tokens displayed. For example, if the two images depict a bank note and a cheque, and the answer display as _O__Y, they would respond with "the link is money." in order to count. Each link can be passed on and returned to later if time permits (if the time expired, the link is treated as a "pass").

There are four rounds in total throughout the course of the game; at each subsequent level the gameplay remains the same, but the available helps are gradually reduced and the token value increases. In round one, two letters are provided and the tokens are 10, 15 and 20. In round two, only one helping letter is given and the 10, 15 and 20 tokens are respectively increased to 20, 25 and 30. In round three, the tokens are 30, 50 and 80. In round four, the tokens are 50, 80 and 100 and no helping letters are given at the start.

After round one, teams must provide a minimum five (out of 10) links in order to move on to the next. If the team clears all four rounds, they will play a bonus level, Super Struck!. Failure to complete a level ends the game, but were allowed to keep with their winnings earned up to that point.

=== Helps and special tokens ===
Helps and special tokens are added starting at the second round, either to aide or hinder the contestant at any time during the gameplay. The team is given three helping letters, each at a $100 cost, to reveal up to three correct letters throughout the game; the helping letters may be provided to the team of their choice, and can be used across one or more words as desired.

Teams will also encounter one of two special tokens during the game, and each token only appear once throughout the game. A Double Struck token (indicated as a jackpot sound effect and a X2 icon) doubles their current winnings if solved, and a Bankrupt token (indicated as a siren with a rubber stamp) will forfeit their current winnings if passed. Teams may pass on that word, but the token will be taken out of play.

Teams are also given a "time out" button, located behind their podium, to use only once in the game. It allows the team to discuss their answers indefinitely while the clock is frozen, however, neither members may respond to the current question until the button is pressed again.

=== Super Struck! ===
Once the team cleared all four levels, teams may take their winnings and leave, or may attempt the bonus round. If they choose to continue, only one team member may play.

The participating team member is given 90 seconds to identify 10 puzzles, cycled with adjacent pictures connecting to the first picture of the next picture, and the last picture connected to the first. Each link to subsequent puzzles had one helping letter; they must answer without the use of additional helps, and passes are allowed. If the contestant fails to identify at least five links, they forfeit all of their winnings. Providing at least eight links doubled their winnings, and if they provide all ten links, their winnings are multiplied tenfold.
