= List of Pac-Man and the Ghostly Adventures episodes =

Episode list for an animated series

This is a list of episodes for the Disney XD animated series Pac-Man and the Ghostly Adventures/Pac-World.

== Series overview ==
Season	Episodes	Original airdates	
Season	Episodes	First aired	Last aired
1	26	June 15, 2013	November 9, 2013
2	26	June 9, 2014	May 29, 2015

== Episodes ==
=== Season 1 (2013) ===
No. overall	No. in season	Title	Written by	United States air date	Canada air date	US viewers (millions)
1	1	"The Adventure Begins"	Tom Ruegger & Paul Rugg	June 15, 2013	17 March 2014 (part 1)	N/A
2	2	"The Adventure Begins"	Tom Ruegger & Paul Rugg	June 15, 2013	17 March 2014 (part 1)	N/A
It has been many years since the Ghost Wars, and no one except for Pac, a cheerful teenage Pac-Worlder, believes in ghosts anymore. But when Pac opens a portal from the Netherworld, ghosts come into Pac-World. Pac meets President Spheros, who tells him each berry on the Tree of Life will give him a different power, but they all allow him to defeat ghosts. The tree also keeps the planet alive, so they must protect it. The Ghosts try to take the Tree of Life, but Pac eats most of them and the last ones (consisting of Blinky, Inky, Pinky, and Clyde) surrender. They think they have won until they find out the Ghosts have the Tree of Life. Pac, his friends, and the ghosts who surrendered sneak into the Netherworld to take back the Tree of Life. It turns out to be a trap. Pinky thinks Pac has a crush on her and at first he denies it, but his friends tell him to say yes. When he does, he and his friends are let out. The Ghost Gang pretend to be outsmarted, while Pac and his friends escape with the Tree of Life.
3	3	"No Pets Allowed...Especially Monsters!"	Sean Catherine Derek	June 19, 2013 (part 1); June 20, 2013 (part 2)	TBA	N/A
4	4	"No Pets Allowed...Especially Monsters!"	Sean Catherine Derek	June 19, 2013 (part 1); June 20, 2013 (part 2)	TBA	N/A
When Betrayus can't defeat Pac (now given the title Pac-Man), he clones a bunch of monsters to create an army that Pac can't eat. Inky, Blinky, Pinky, and Clyde warn Pac, and he uses the berries against the monsters. But one monster saves him when he runs out of berries, and Pac wants to keep him as a pet. But there's only one problem: no pets are allowed in the dorm. Dr. Buttocks creates a machine that makes giant monsters, but Pac uses a berry to make him giant too. He defeats one monster, but there is still one left and the berry wears off. Just then, Sir Cumference comes with a shrink ray and Pac goes into the monster's mouth to shrink it. Meanwhile, the pet is too much, so they give it to Sir Cumference.
5	5	"All You Can Eat"	Dennis Haley & Marcy Brown	June 21, 2013	TBA	N/A
Betrayus finds out Pac-Man's weakness is food, so he forces Inky, Blinky, Pinky, and Clyde to make Pac too full to eat ghosts. When the ghosts steal too much food, President Spheros limits him to three meals a day, but Betrayus makes him eat Netherworld food. He gets too full and the ghosts attack, but Clyde burps him and he eats the ghosts. Back in the Netherworld, there is no more food and Betrayus must deal with an angry Fluffy.
6	6	"President Possessed!"	Len Uhley	June 24, 2013	TBA	N/A
When Ghosts attack President Spheros, Dr. Buttocks possesses him as part of Betrayus' plot to find the repository that is holding Betrayus' body. Pac-Man and his friends go to see Sir Cumference and get a Paco-Strobo-Cacophonater. The possessed President Spheros makes everyone hate Pac-Man and Pac finds out he's been possessed. He makes Pac give him the berries and it is actually the Paco-Strobo-Cacophonater which gets Dr. Buttocks out of President Spheros' body.
7	7	"Is Zit You or Is Zit Me?"	Ken Pontac	June 25, 2013	TBA	N/A
Pac has a huge zit just before picture day. The more stressed he gets, the more zits he gets, so Betrayus gets ghosts to stress him out. When they attack him, he tries a shrink berry, only for him to accidentally eat a balloon berry. He realizes his friends don't care how he looks, so he just eats the insulting ghosts. Meanwhile, Sir Cumference looks for the portal to the Netherworld, but the ghosts get in the way. Pac defeats them and seals the portal with his zits. Because of his paint allergy, Skeebo is the one who has zits on picture day instead of Pac.
8	8	"Pac to the Future"	Glenn Leopold	June 26, 2013	TBA	N/A
President Spheros is throwing a party and Pac wishes his parents are there. Meanwhile, Betrayus plans an attack on Indepacdence Day. Pac decides to see Sir Cumference, and he makes a super-fast vehicle that ends up taking them back in time. He meets his parents and himself as a baby (he can't tell his parents who he is, however). He meets Sir Cumference in the past and has to get him some parts to fix the machine, but is also asked to babysit himself, which he has a hard time with. His friends get the parts and he finds out Butt-ler has been spying on them. Just before he goes back, his parents find out who he is. Once he's back, he and his friends defeat the ghosts.
9	9	"Heebo-Skeebo"	Bob Forward	June 27, 2013	TBA	N/A
Kingpin Obtuse is spying on Pac-Man for Betrayus and calls for an invasion but Inky, Blinky, Pinky and Clyde are just playing tricks on the citizens. Skeebo is jealous when Pac-Man saves the day, and he wants berries so he can be a hero. Betrayus wants the power berries too, so Kingpin Obtuse and Skeebo team up but Hailee can't get the power berries and gives up. Betrayus gets Ghosts as a distraction and Kingpin Obtuse gets Skeebo back and he takes the berries but keeps them all for himself. Skeebo uses the berries for showing off even though he can't eat Ghosts. Kingpin Obtuse makes him take on Betrayus and Pac has to rescue him. Dr. Buttocks captures Skeebo and tries to take his power berries but Skeebo ate them all. Pac-Man saves Skeebo, but Skeebo still hates him and leaves. The next morning, there is an article in the paper on how Skeebo isn't a hero upon him cowering before Betrayus.
10	10	"Mission ImPacable!"	Jymn Magon	June 28, 2013	TBA	N/A
When Pac eats all the food he sees, he decides he needs better self-control. Dr. Buttocks has different ideas and invents a chip to control Pac-Man. Pac goes to see Sir Cumfrence about his eating and tells him it's all in his head and next time he wants to eat, he should just say no. Betrayus tries to make Pac eat the ghost with the chip inside it, but Pac tries not to using his new sense of self-control; Betrayus has to force the ghost in his mouth. Betrayus starts playing around with Pac-Man and his friends think he's resisting his temptation. Meanwhile, Inky, Blinky, Pinky, and Clyde find out Dr. Buttocks wants to control Pac-Man too, but Betrayus won't let him. Inky, Blinky, Pinky and Clyde tell Pac-Man about the situation. He needs a berry, but Betrayus makes him destroy the berries, leaving him with no other place to go to but the Tree of Life, but instead, he and his friends sneak in with Pac-Man blindfolded; Betrayus thinks he's asleep, so he goes to sleep too. Unfortunately, Pac wakes him up. He tries attacking Pac with Fluffy, but his friends tie Fluffy to a bungee cord. Pac burps out the chip, it lands on Betrayus, and Butt-ler gets the remote.
11	11	"No Body Knows" "Nobody Knows"	Dennis Haley & Marcy Brown	July 1, 2013	TBA	N/A
Betrayus puts spy bugs everywhere to spy on President Spheros and to find the repository. He gets Pac-Man to guard it while Sir Cumference moves it. Betrayus gets mad at Inky, Blinky, Pinky and Clyde but gets a note and finds the repository. He sends out the Creepies. Inky, Blinky, Pinky and Clyde tell Pac-Man and he says he'll try to get their bodies back. The Creepies have the repository by the time Pac gets there, and they take it into the maze. Pac and the Creepies fight over the repository, but they lose it and Inky, Blinky, Pinky and Clyde get it and get a body. The Creepies take it through the portal. Inky, Blinky, Pinky and Clyde can't get along in one body so they come along to get the repository. The handle is broken off the repository so Betrayus sends the Creepies to find another way to open it. Pac and his friends find the repository but loses his berries and is caught by Betrayus. Inky, Blinky, Pinky and Clyde turn back into Ghosts and help Pac-Man. He eats all the ghosts and gets the repository. Sir Cumference takes the repository somewhere unknown before Inky, Blinky, Pinky and Clyde can get their bodies back. Meanwhile Betrayus has to deal with an angry mob of ghosts.
12	12	"Seems Like Old Times"	Glenn Leopold	July 2, 2013	TBA	N/A
Sir Cumference won't come out of his lab, locks it up and won't answer President Spheros' calls. Pac-Man goes to see why and finds out he's working on a top secret machine but needs slimetainium. Dr. Buttocks creates a machine to suck Pac-Man's brain. He says they need Cyclops Eye Goo. Pinky shows him the way to the sleeping cyclops, but Sir Cumference crashes and nearly falls off a cliff. He tries to get the eye goo, but wakes one up. They sound an alarm. A bunch of Ghosts attack them. They get away, but he thinks Pac-Man and his friends don't believe in him and so he goes back without them. Sir Cumference gets caught and Dr. Buttocks is about to brain-suck him but keeps on talking. Fuzbitz knocks it out of his hands and on to Betrayus. Dr. Buttocks and Buttler suck his brain. Pac-Man and his friends escape with the Eye Goo, and Sir Cumference proves he's still a fighter.
13	13	"Betrayus Turns the Heat Up"	Mark Young	July 3, 2013	TBA	N/A
The people of PacWorld are starting to get scorching hot! When Sir Cumfrence creates a unsliming machine he tests it on the white house secretary. The machine backfires and the Secretary of Security is infuriated. Meanwhile, Lord Betrayus is causing the heat wave with Dr. Buttock's machine powered by the flames of three Pac-Dragons and makes it even hotter with a plan to make all the Pac-Worlders drowsy and want to sleep. Back in Pac-World, the Secretary of Security accuses Sir Cumfrence of causing the heat wave. He demands house arrest against Sir Cumfrence, but Pac and his friends help Sir Cumference escape. The heat wave is causing the Tree of Life to die and that means all the power out of the berries is starting to stop working. The group then figure out that Betrayus was behind it all. Inky, Blinky, Pinky and Clyde finish off the mystery. Since the Power Berries are dead, Spiral and Cylindria cannot go with Pac-Man. Pac-Man goes with the Blinky, Inky, Pinky, and Clyde and they spot Dr. Buttocks who Pac eats and burps out his eyes. Pac then confuses three Pac-Dragons which makes causes them destroy the furnace. Pac returns to Pac-World and President Spheros fires the Secretary of Security and Buttocks deals with some angry Pac-Dragons.
14	14	"Pac-Pong Fever"	Eric Shaw	July 5, 2013	TBA	N/A
Pac and Spiral compete for the Paclympics. Cylindria finds out Pac's aunt is Spheria Suprema, a great Pac-Pong player. The only one who came close to beating her was Betrayus who says she cheated. Spheria challenges Pac, Spiral and Cylindria to a game of Pac-Pong. When Betrayus demands a rematch, Spheria accepts so Betrayus has to get into shape. Sir Cumference helps Spheria by creating a machine...which she beats. Betrayus makes Dr. Buttocks and Butt-ler work out instead of him. The match is held in the netherworld, and Butt-ler try's to help Betrayus cheat. When that doesn't work, he uses distractions. Pac eats the ghosts helping Betrayus, and Spheria wins. Spheria begins training Pac and his friends for the next Paclympics.
15	15	"Driver's Pac"	Dennis Haley & Marcy Brown	July 22, 2013	TBA	N/A
Pac-Man is getting ready to take his drivers test and is telling Spiral and Cylindria that he is confident because he practiced with his Aunt Spheria. He fails the test because of a suspicious shaking in the ground. Pac-Man and his friends go to the lab where Sir Cumference and Aunt Spheria are working on Pac's ride. In the Netherworld, it is revealed that Betrayus is drilling a hole into PacWorld. Guest star: Mark Oliver as Mr. Strictler
16	16	"Jinxed"	Michael Maurer	July 23, 2013	TBA	N/A
Betrayus enlists the aid of a lovesick witch named Madame Ghoulasha in giving the Pac-Man bad luck with a jinx. Meanwhile, Dr. Buttocks is suspicious that the Ghost Gang is aiding Pac-Man. So he has them bugged with a device, thus preventing them from telling Pacster about Betrayus' latest scheme. Yet the Ghost Gang got around it by showing boards with words instead of actually saying them. Then Betrayus breaks the deal when he refused to marry Madame Ghoulasha so the curse was reversed and Pac had good luck instead.
17	17	"Indiana Pac and the Temple of Slime"	Ken Pontac	August 31, 2013	TBA	N/A
An ancient artifact that once belonged to Pac-Man's parents leads to a temple within a maze that may hold the secret to the Tree of Life.
18	18	"Planet Pac" "Planet Pac vs. the Ghosteroid"	Ken Pontac	September 14, 2013	TBA	0.24
In an attempt to save Pac-World from a giant Ghosteroid that is lured in by Dr. Buttocks, Pac-Man must grow to planet-sized proportions. When the Netherworld is also threatened by the Ghosteroid, Betrayus sends the Ghost Gang to help Pac-Man.
19	19	"Stand by Your Pac-Man"	Story by : Steve Granat & Cydne Clark; Teleplay by : Sean Catherine Derek	September 21, 2013	TBA	0.29
Pinky gets jealous of Pac-Man's friendship with Cylindria on ValenPac Day. Meanwhile, Betrayus summons the Pacinator, the criminal who got rid of all of the Yellow Ones (except Pac-Man), to freeze Pac-Man with his frozen yogurt gun that freezes anyone who consumes it. During this time, Pac-Man learns that the Pacinator had gotten rid of the Yellow Ones under the orders of someone he claims is more evil than Betrayus.
20	20	"PacLantis"	Dennis Haley & Marcy Brown	September 28, 2013	TBA	0.35
When Dr. Buttocks acquires a map leading to the ancient lost city of PacLantis, Pac, Cyli and Spiral voyage to the bottom of the sea to try to beat Butt-ler, Buttocks, Betrayus, and the Ghost Gang, and retrieve the legendary Power Berry of Youth.
21	21	"Jurassic Pac"	Ken Pontac	October 5, 2013	TBA	0.45
When Fuzbitz unearths a Pacosaurus Pex skeleton, Dr. Buttocks, along with his doppelgänger, clone and reanimate the fossilized creatures back to life. In order to save Pac-World and the Round House, Pac must eat an Elder Berry to stop them, but it also causes him to become wild. Pac grows into a giant ape reminiscent of King Kong and, after scaring off the dinosaurs, kidnaps Cyli. She reminds him of their friendship by mentioning past instances, like putting make-up on his zit-covered face, picnicking on his planet-sized nose, and climbing in his ginormous mouth in the Temple of Slime.
22	22	"A Berry Scary Night"	Sean Catherine Derek & Glenn Leopold	October 12, 2013	TBA	0.30
The two moons of PacWorld turn blue every 100 Halloweens, so Betrayus summons the sinister Pac-Vampire named Count Pacula to drain the last Yellow One in PacWorld.
23	23	"The Great Chase!"	Jymn Magon	October 19, 2013	TBA	0.35
Betrayus tries to learn the secret location of the Repository, so he possesses his mother's body while Dr. Buttocks hypnotizes the president.
24	24	"Robo Woes"	Ken Pontac	October 26, 2013	22 July 2014	0.31
When a super gigantic robot from outer space invades Pacopolis wielding a weapon that renders the power berries powerless, Pac-Man faces the ultimate challenge and nearly succumbs to doubts that without the berries, he is not really a hero.
25	25	"The Spy Who Slimed Me"	Dennis Haley & Marcy Brown	November 2, 2013	TBA	0.36
The Ghost Gang finds out a spy ghost named Specter, hired by Betrayus to steal the Repository, possesses Aunt Spheria's dog Uggles in order to infiltrate Sir Cumference's lab and they inform Pac-Man, but Specter nonetheless has plans of his own. When Pac-Man and his friends discover that Specter is a rebel who wants both Pac-World and the Netherworld for himself, they expose him as a liar and a traitor using Larry, the Ghost Gang's slug-cam friend.
26	26	"Invasion of the Pointy Heads"	Ken Pontac	November 9, 2013	26 August 2014	0.47
With the aid of the Pac-Aliens, Apex strikes a deal with the Netherworld to join forces to take over Pac-World. Yet when Apex turns against Betrayus to take over Pac-World for himself and give everyone the virus and no working hospitals, Pac-Man must work with Betrayus to stop the Pac-Aliens before they take over Pac-World. In the end, Pac-Man discovers from Apex that his parents are still alive.

=== Season 2 (2014) ===
No. overall	No. in season	Title	Written by	United States air date	Canada air date	US viewers (millions)
27	1	"Ride the Wild Pac-Topus"	Dennis Haley & Marcy Brown	June 9, 2014	9 September 2014	N/A
President Spheros asks Pac to guard a golden key, but Dr. Buttocks rigs a ride at the carnival to get it from him, but Skeebo rides it. He rigs more rides, but they keep on backfiring. Meanwhile, the Ghost Gang sneak into the carnival to have their own fun.
28	2	"Meanie Genie"	Ken Pontac	June 10, 2014	TBA	N/A
Pac-Man is tricked into finding a bottle holding a genie who promises to grant his three wishes.
29	3	"Cave Pac-Man"	Sean Catherine Derek	June 11, 2014	TBA	N/A
Dr. Buttock's latest shenanigans wind up defrosting a Prehistoric Cave-Kid, who is soon pursued by scientists bent on locking him away - including Dr. B - so Pac and Pals are finally forced to risk it all and travel back in time to return him to prehistoric PacWorld.
30	4	"Cosmic Contest"	Ken Pontac	June 12, 2014	TBA	N/A
During a pointy head and ghost invasion, everyone gets frozen in individual force fields when a disembodied voice states that the ruckus has woken a powerful alien race called the Overlords of the Outer Reaches from a centuries long nap, and decides to settle the dispute once and for all. Three teams, Pac and Spiral, Dr. Buttocks and Betrayus, and Apex and Tip (a fellow pointy head), will compete in a race through time and space, the winners will be allowed to remain on Pac World, the losers will be sent into a dimension of nothingness.
31	5	"That Smarts!"	Ken Pontac	June 16, 2014	4 November 2014	N/A
In the absence of Sir C, Pacopolis needs a new genius.
32	6	"Pac-Mania"	Dennis Haley & Marcy Brown	June 17, 2014	18 November 2014	N/A
Pac-Man enjoys being a celebrity until a TV show begins to make Pac, Cyli, and Spiral look like fools and Betrayus plans to use it for his own evil plans.
33	7	"Rip Van Packle"	Michael Maurer	June 23, 2014	26 November 2014	N/A
Cylindria reminds Pac that it is her 15th birthday. Later, while looking for his parents in space, Pac-Man finds himself transported 70 years into the future where Betrayus rules Pac-World and has bewitched all innocent lives except for Cylindria, Spiral and Sir Cumference (Cyli describes herself as a kung fu granny, indicating that she may be a grandmother). In the end, it is revealed that it was all just a dream.
34	8	"Spooka-Bazooka!"	Jymn Magon	June 24, 2014	2 December 2014	N/A
Dr. Buttocks invents a weapon called the spooka-bazooka, a device which can be used to capture ghosts, and ends up putting a tired Pac-Man out of a job. But the device has one hidden feature: it plays an irresistible lullaby that puts its users to sleep for 100 minutes, thus allowing Betrayus to invade Pacopolis. Can Pac-Man stop the ghosts while the entire world is asleep? Meanwhile, the narrator tells this story as if it is Sleeping Beauty, which annoys Buttocks.
35	9	"The Pac Be with You"	Dennis Haley & Marcy Brown	June 30, 2014	25 January 2015	N/A
Pac learns a new fighting technique from Blinky when the ultimate ninja ghost named Master Goo trains Betrayus' army.
36	10	"The Shadow of the Were-Pac"	Ken Pontac	October 8, 2014	TBA	N/A
President Spheros decides to throw the spookiest Halloween party ever, but a series of mysterious Were-Pac attacks threaten the event.
37	11	"Cap'n Banshee and His Interstellar Buccaneers"	Ken Pontac	October 14, 2014	TBA	N/A
A summer sky cruise takes a turn for the worse when Pac and his pals are confronted by ghostly pirates from outer space. Pac and his allies must save the day.
38	12	"A Hard Dazed Knight"	Jymn Magon	October 15, 2014	17 March 2015	N/A
When Dr. Buttocks coats some ancient armor with his newly invented Buttanium, he creates a ghost army that not even Pac-Man can chew through. With Sir Cumference's help, Pac-Man manages to break a hole in the armor so he can suck the ghosts into his mouth.
39	13	"Happy Holidays and a Merry Berry Day (Part 2)"	Ken Pontac & Sean Catherine Derek	December 2, 2014	7 December 2014	0.25
Pac meets his parents on a "top-secret" mission on another celebration of the holiday Berry Day. Pac chooses to hide them from his friends, who eventually become suspicious that something is wrong. This was originally produced as part 2 of a 44-minute project called Santa Pac's Merry Berry Day. As such, the episode's events take place exactly 1 year after the 2015 "Santa Pac" episode.

=== Season 3 (2015) ===
This season is technically only the second half of season 2, and was originally pitched as such to English distributors, but when it was picked up in May 2015, the episodes (originally slated for 2014) were instead distributed and classified as season 3 from June to December of 2015. Unlike DXD and CHRGD, the Radio Times in the United Kingdom appears to have ignored the season 3 splitting and considers episodes 40-52 to be episodes 14-26 of "series 2".

No. overall	No. in season	Title	Written by	Original debut	Alternate debuts	US viewers (millions)
40	1	"Peace Without Slime (Part 1)"	Sean Catherine Derek	31 January 2015 in Japan	May 18, 2015	N/A
Pac-World's election is coming up and Betrayus uses Obtuse as a puppet candidate. He rigs the election and wins, hoping to find the Tree of Life and the Repository. Meanwhile, Cylindria and Skeebo begin to run for class president, with comedic results.
41	2	"The Ghost Behind the Throne (Part 2)"	Ken Pontac	7 February 2015 in Japan	May 19, 2015	N/A
Soon after the election, Obtuse is to be sworn in as the new President. Pac-Man, his friends and former President Spheros smuggle the Tree of Life and the Repository out of the Round House. They then trick Betrayus and Obtuse into confessing their wrongdoing to the public. After being chased out an angry mob, they throw both Obtuse and Betrayus out of the Round House and Spheros is re-elected at last.
42	3	"Nerd is the Word"	Jymn Magon	14 February 2015 in Japan	May 20, 2015	N/A
Betrayus and Buttocks disguise Butt-ler as a foreign exchange student and order him to spy on Pac-Man. However, after receiving kindness from Pac-Man and his best friends, he is able to help Pac-Man prevent and defeat another ghost invasion. This episode was titled "The Nerd Is the Word" in the United Kingdom.
43	4	"Bride of Grinder"	Ken Pontac	21 February 2015 in Japan	May 21, 2015	N/A
It's spring time in Pacopolis, and that means that love is in the air, but Grinder has no one to love, so he builds a female version of himself. When he fails to bring her to life, Dr. Buttocks takes her away to find information about the Tree of Life and the Repository. Meanwhile, Pinky chases Pac-Man all around the city Sadie Hawkins-style.
44	5	"The Legend of Creepy Hollow"	Dennis Haley & Marcy Brown	7 March 2015 in Japan	May 22, 2015	N/A
While on a camping trip to Creepy Hollow, Skeebo manages to scare Pac, Cyli, & Spiral into believing in a mythical creature, known as Hugefoot. Betrayus sees this as a weakness, so he orders Buttocks to build a robot version of it. Pac and his friends try to get back at Skeebo by using Blinky, Inky, Pinky, & Clyde to disguise themselves in a Hugefoot suit. Meanwhile, Pac runs into the real Hugefoot.
45	6	"Easter Egg Island"	Ken Pontac	28 February 2015 in Japan	May 26, 2015	N/A
When the Easter Marshmallow Chicken, the Pac-Peep, has kidnapped all of the ghosts in the Netherworld, Betrayus enlists Pac's help to go to Easter Egg Island to get them back. But they bring Cyli's parents and grandmother as company much to Cyli's dismay.
46	7	"The Wizard of Odd"	Dennis Haley & Marcy Brown	14 March 2015 in Japan	May 27, 2015	N/A
Dr. Buttocks attracts a space worm to PacWorld, and Pac & Fuzbitz are sucked into it and zapped into an Oz-like dimension called Odd. With the help of some new friends (which look a lot like his current friends on PacWorld), Pac & Fuzbitz must find a way to get back home and stop Buttocks from using the space worm to suck PacWorld into oblivion!
47	8	"Indiana Pac and the Dentures of Doom"	Ken Pontac	21 March 2015 in Japan	May 28, 2015	N/A
A curse on an evil mummy's diabolical dentures is lifted, and if it returns to its owner, it could cause the very destruction of Pac-World, so Pac & his friends must stop Buttocks & Betrayus from finding the dentures first.
48	9	"Honey, I Digitized the Pac-Man"	Michael Maurer	28 March 2015 in Japan	May 29, 2015	N/A
Buttocks releases a deadly computer virus on Pac-World's electrical devices; with the help of Sir C, a digitized Pac ventures into cyberspace to stop it.
49	10	"Pac's Very Scary Halloween"	Ken Pontac	4 April 2015 (part 1) in Japan; 11 April 2015 (part 2) in Japan	before July 2016 (Family Chrgd on Demand); October 4, 2016 on Netflix (US)	N/A
50	11	"Pac's Very Scary Halloween"	Ken Pontac	4 April 2015 (part 1) in Japan; 11 April 2015 (part 2) in Japan	before July 2016 (Family Chrgd on Demand); October 4, 2016 on Netflix (US)	N/A
Dr. Pacenstein invites Pac, Spiral and Cylindria to his castle for a spooky Halloween dinner, with secret plans to put one of them on the menu. Dr. Pacenstein and Pac end up swapping their minds. After Dr. Pacenstein (who is double-crossing Betrayus and Dr. Buttocks at the moment) plays switcheroo with Pac's body and mind, Spiral and Cylindria try to scare up help from the doctor's neighbor, Count Pacula. Pac-Man defeats Dr. Pacenstein, and Sir C swaps back their minds. Originally developed under the title Pac's Scary Halloween.
51	12	"Santa Pac (Part 1)"	Dennis Haley & Marcy Brown	18 April 2015 in Japan	13 December 2015 in Canada; September 5, 2015 on Netflix (US)	N/A
Pac-Man meets Santa-Pac (whom he calls "Santa" for short) when he has to rescue him and his round-deer from the Netherworld after he is kidnapped. This was originally produced as part 1 of a 44-minute episode project initially titled Santa Pac's Merry Berry Day. As such, the events take place exactly 1 year before the 2014 "Happy Holidays and a Merry Berry Day" episode.
52	13	"New Girl in Town"	Dennis Haley & Marcy Brown	25 April 2015 in Japan	May 29, 2015	N/A
When Elli, the president's beautiful niece, comes to visit Pacopolis, Betrayus at first tries to keep them apart, and then, when that fails, he uses her to seduce Pac-Man into getting the repository by possessing her. During the plan, Pac-Man starts ignoring his friends in his attempts to bond with her, which fuels Pinky's jealousy. Later on, Elli reveals that she might have seen Pac's parents during one of her trips with her mom.
