= Dark (video game) =

2013 video game

DARK
- European cover art
- Developer: Realmforge Studios
- Publisher: Kalypso Media
- Director: Benjamin Rauscher
- Designer: Christian Wolfertstetter
- Programmer: Korbinian Abenthum
- Artist: Victor Linke
- Engine: Vision
- Platforms: Microsoft Windows, Xbox 360
- Release: NA: 3 July 2013 (PC); EU: 5 July 2013; NA: 9 July 2013 (X360); AU: 18 July 2013
- Genres: Stealth, action-adventure
- Mode: Single-player

Dark (stylized as DARK) is a stealth game developed by German team Realmforge Studios and published by Kalypso Media in 2013. Players control Eric Bane, a vampire suffering from amnesia who seeks to recover his memories.

== Gameplay ==
The gameplay of Dark is based on stealth combat. The protagonist Eric Bane has many supernatural vampiric 'skills' at his disposal; he can use Shadow Leap to quickly teleport to different areas and to perform stealth finishers, make himself temporarily invisible, see in the dark and slow down time. His abilities are linked to a certain number of 'blood points' which are used up each time Eric uses a skill. He can drink blood from his enemies to restore his health and blood points.

== Plot ==
The game follows the story of Eric Bane (Doug Cockle), a newly turned vampire suffering from amnesia. He learns that his transformation is not complete and that, if he does not drink the blood of his sire, he will mutate into a mindless ghoul. In order to avoid being such a foul creature, he receives missions to drink ancient vampires' blood. However, an angel in Eric's view appears to guide him to the righteous path, and ease intolerable pain that comes from not drinking appropriate blood as it disappears. With a question of this vision, he tries to recover his deleted memories and his true self.

== Release ==
Dark was officially announced on 4 May 2012. A playable version of the game was presented at the 2012 Role Play Convention in Cologne and the E3 2012. The game was released in July 2013 on PC and Xbox 360. It was also released digitally on the Xbox 360 Marketplace.

== Reception ==
Reception

Aggregate score
Aggregator	Score	
Aggregator	PC	Xbox 360
Metacritic	41/100	38/100

Review scores
Publication	Score	
Publication	PC	Xbox 360
Edge	N/A	3/10
Eurogamer	N/A	3/10
Game Informer	N/A	2/10
GameSpot	3.5/10	N/A
GamesRadar+	2.5/5	N/A
IGN	4/10	4/10
Official Xbox Magazine (UK)	N/A	6/10
Official Xbox Magazine (US)	N/A	4.5/10
PC Gamer (UK)	43%	N/A
Polygon	3/10	N/A
The Digital Fix	N/A	3/10
The Escapist	N/A	2/5

Dark received "generally unfavorable" reviews from critics, according to review aggregator website Metacritic. Much of the game's criticism was aimed at the poor melee combat, camera, script, and lack of interest in the game's protagonist.

In a mixed review, Jon Blythe of Official Xbox Magazine UK stated: "DARK is frustrating, because that initial feeling of being a zippy blur of a vampire in a world of neon-lit night never leaves you. It's just swamped in frustrating design decisions, a script that lurches from passable to laughable, weak enemy AI, and a vortex of a lead character who's impossible to like or hate."

Dan Whitehead of Eurogamer stated that "low-budget games can be delightful and surprising, but only if the core elements work. Here, they don't. In its best moments, this is only ever a reminder of better games. In its worst moments – of which there are far too many – Dark frustrates and irritates as only a clumsy stealth game can."

Michael Engle of The Game Scouts said, "I would rather [insert cliché about how to kill a vampire here] than play this game."

In the most negative review on the website, Andrew Reiner of Game Informer complained that "I've played a lot of bad Xbox 360 games for achievements, but hardly any are as unpolished and poorly executed as Dark. It's easily one of this generation's worst titles. Even when the stealth is working moderately well, the slow pacing is a killer, and no amount of blood sucking brings satisfaction. Most levels were completed through trial and error, failure after failure, and then success coming from exploiting an AI bug or an odd design decision."
