= Tower of Saviors =

2013 video game

- Developer: Mad Head Limited
- Composers: Alan Ng; Joe Huang; Shao-Lun Lu
- Platforms: iOS, Android
- Release: 2013
- Genres: Puzzle, RPG

Tower of Saviors (神魔之塔) is a mobile game developed by Mad Head Limited, a Hong Kong-based mobile application developer. It is a combination of a match 3 game and an RPG and features characters from various mythologies and cultures.

== Plot and setting ==
Tower of Saviors takes place in a fantasy world where players assume the role of "Summoners" and collect various monster cards with various mythological backgrounds and rarities.

In ancient times, humanity built the Enochian Tower, which was used to reach the heavens and learn the ways of the gods. Soon after, demons of both hell and Earth attempted to use it as a gateway to enter and destroy the world of the gods, beginning a war between the gods, demons, and humanity. When the demons were about to succeed in their plan, the gods used the last of their strength to break off the top of the tower and place seals on it, sealing the demons within it. Thousands of years later, humanity's only hope to end the war with the remaining demons is for the Summoners to unleash the Tower's Seals and seek help from the gods.

== Gameplay ==
Screenshot of the main user interface

Players progress by completing stages in which they defeat monsters by aligning Runestones, tiles which must be aligned horizontally or vertically to dissolve them. Aligning at least three Runestones of the same attribute will give the players' monsters power to attack, corresponding with the attributes of the Runestones, which are Water, Fire, Earth, Light and Dark. Runestones can be moved across the board within a certain time limit each round; once time is up, the attack power is calculated according to the number of Runestones dissolved. Players can make a Combo by dissolving two or more combinations of Runestones, with the attack increasing in power as more Combos are made.

Each card has an attribute and three statistics: health, attack and recovery, It also has an Active skill, which requires a certain number of rounds to pass before it can be activated, and a Leader skill, which applies to the rest of the team if the Monster is set as leader. Players form teams of Monsters which include five cards and one leader, with the team's health, attack, and recovery depending on the cards' individual statistics and the active Leader skill. Players can also form and store teams corresponding to their level in-game. Before gameplay, users can choose an ally from their friends in-game and from three random player's avatars; the ally's Leader skill will also apply to the team. During gameplay, players face monsters with a specific health, attack and defence, with the number of moves they can make before the monster attacks represented by the letters "CD", standing for cooldown, above them.

Every player has an energy limit that increases in capacity as they level up and is displayed at the bottom of the home screen. Energy is used to participate in battles, with one unit of energy being restored every eight minutes until the bar is full. Experience is gained at the end of each battle, which is shown in the top-left of the home screen along with the player's level. Users accumulate experience in order to level up, which restores energy.

Users progress through the game's storyline by completing stages in the five locations found on the home screen in, clockwise from top-left: Glacial Iceberg, Afire Volcano, Dark Cove, Divine Woodland, and Holylight City, each representing a specific attribute, before reaching Enochian Tower (Centre) and unlocking various "seals". After the seventh seal is defeated, users progress to the eighth and ninth seals beyond the reaches of the tower, which can be accessed by scrolling upwards from the home page. Main stages are permanently available once they are unlocked.

Additional levels can be accessed through a floating boat and a flying dragon to the left and right of the tower, respectively. The boat allows players to access daily stages and special limited-time stages, with daily stages providing players with evolution materials for evolving cards. The flying dragon allows players to access "Story Stages", which include extra stages of four different difficulties with themes based on different cultures, such as the zodiac and Norse mythology.

There are two types of main currencies in the game: Coins and Diamonds. Coins are collected from battles and through discomposing cards, while diamonds are obtained from completing sets of stages. Coins are used for levelling up and evolving cards and trading cards, as well as unlocking old stages. Diamonds are used for revival after death, refilling energy, increasing storage space, and drawing rare cards from the "diamond seal".

Cards are stored in the inventory, where they can be levelled up, evolved or decomposed. Cards can be fed to other cards to increase their level and statistics or decomposed for souls and coins. Once a card has reached its maximum level, it can be evolved into a card with higher statistics and sometimes more powerful active and leader skills, which requires specific cards. Other stages of evolution, "Power Release" and "Virtual Rebirth", do not require the previous card to be levelled up completely, but instead are obtained by completing a specific stage. Cards can also be upgraded through "Amelioration", which increases which their statistics and skills. Other ways a card can be upgraded are by reducing their cooldown time by accumulating the number of rounds a card has battled and by feeding a card with another card with the same active skill, although the effect is not guaranteed unless five cards of the same active skill are fed to the same card.

Players can also join Guilds, which allows them to collect keys through "Guild Missions", which allow them access to levels that contain rare cards.

== Plagiarism accusations ==
Mad Head has been accused of plagiarism due to alleged gameplay similarities between it and Puzzle & Dragons. However, Terry Tsang Kin-chung, the CEO of Mad Head, has denied these allegations.

On 26 May 2026, Mad Head released the promotional video of the new "Destined Khaganhood – Genghis Khan" character. However, part of the animation in the video was accused of AI-edited plagiarism, due to high similarities between it and the animation of a Wuthering Waves character, Hiyuki. The reflections on the shards of the Genghis Khan video was also the reflection of Hiyuki. After the discovery by the development team, the promotional video was made private. On 27 May 2026, the development team admitted and apologized for the similarity.

== Links ==
- Official website
