= Go Home Dinosaurs! =

2013 video game

- Developer: Fire Hose Games
- Publisher: Fire Hose Games
- Platforms: Windows, iOS
- Release: Windows; March 14, 2013; iOS; May 9, 2013
- Genres: Tower defense, puzzle
- Mode: Single-player

Go Home Dinosaurs! is a tower defense video game developed and published by Fire Hose Games. It was released on March 14, 2013, for Windows and May 9, 2013, for iPad. The game focuses on a group of gophers working to protect their barbecue party after it gets crashed by a horde of dinosaurs.

== Gameplay ==
Go Home Dinosaurs! is divided into three locations containing 20 levels each. The main objective is to control a young gopher, who throws rocks at any dinosaurs within range to prevent them from reaching a grill with three steaks at the end of the path. If a dinosaur reaches the grill, they will blow up sticks of dynamite near it, causing a loss of one steak; the player will lose the level if all three steaks are lost. Additional defenses can be added via cards, which are usable by collecting enough coconuts from palm trees that randomly spawn throughout the board. By completing levels, the player will earn coins, which can be used to purchase power-up cards and costumes for the main gopher to use.

== Development ==
Go Home Dinosaurs! was first shown at the 2011 PAX event. In 2012, Fire Hose Games launched a playable beta version of the game on Chrome, with several updates subsequently released to enhance gameplay. Initially intended for a late 2012 release, the game was delayed to polish and add extra content; it was eventually released on Steam in March 2013, followed by an iPad release in May, that same year.

== Reception ==
Reception

Aggregate score
Aggregator	Score
Metacritic	(PC) 90/100 (iOS) 79/100

Review scores
Publication	Score
Destructoid	(iOS) 8/10
Gamezebo	(PC) 70/100
Jeuxvideo.com	(PC) 14/20
MacLife	(iOS) 3.5/5
Pocket Gamer	(iOS) 3.5/5
TouchArcade	(iOS) 4/5

The PC version received "universal acclaim", while the iOS version received "generally favorable reviews", according to the review aggregation website Metacritic. Eric Ford of TouchArcade praised the game's combination of tower defense and puzzle elements but noted control issues with the mobile version. Andy Chalk of Gamezebo noted the game's lack of violence and short length, and called it "fairly shallow", though he stated that it would be a good game for tower defense fans to play with their children.
