= Final Exam (video game) =

2013 video game

- Developer: Mighty Rocket Studio
- Publisher: Focus Home Interactive
- Platforms: PlayStation 3, Xbox 360, Microsoft Windows
- Release: Windows: EU: 6 September 2013; NA: 5 November 2013 (Steam); PlayStation Network: NA: 5 November 2013; PAL: 6 November 2013; JP: 4 March 2014; Xbox Live Arcade: WW: 8 November 2013
- Genres: Hack and slash, shooter, platform

Final Exam is a 2013 side-scroller video game developed by Mighty Rocket Studio for Xbox Live Arcade, PlayStation Network and Microsoft Windows. Up to 4 players can work together to survive the outbreak. Many compared the game to a 2D version of Resident Evil Outbreak or Left 4 Dead.

== Reception ==
Reception

Aggregate score
Aggregator	Score		
Aggregator	PC	PS3	Xbox 360
Metacritic	66/100	60/100	57/100

Review scores
Publication	Score		
Publication	PC	PS3	Xbox 360
Destructoid	N/A	N/A	5/10
GameSpot	N/A	5/10	N/A
PlayStation Official Magazine – UK	N/A	5/10	N/A
Official Xbox Magazine (UK)	N/A	N/A	4/10
Official Xbox Magazine (US)	N/A	N/A	7/10

Initial pre-release feedback of the game was mixed due to the fact that Mighty Rocket Studio originally intended the game as a reboot of the survival horror game Obscure. The negative feedback caused the developer to change the name of the game to Final Exam.

Upon full release, the game received "mixed or average reviews" on all platforms according to the review aggregation website Metacritic. Matt Beaudette of Hardcore Gamer said of the game, "There are better options available for those simply looking for a cheap sidescroller to play once and forget about. Those who can get invested in learning and mastering a deep combat system, however, will find a lot to like in Final Exam" Smooth Town wrote, "This is a fine starting point for whatever future holds for the Obscure franchise"; however, they noted the problems with repetitiveness and cheap boss fights.
