= Alien Spidy =

2013 video game

- Developer: Enigma Software Productions
- Publisher: Kalypso Media
- Platforms: Windows, Macintosh, Xbox 360 (XBLA), PlayStation 3 (PSN)
- Release: Mac, Windows, Xbox 360; 20 March 2013; PlayStation 3; 16 July 2013
- Genre: Platform
- Mode: Single-player

Alien Spidy is a platform game for Microsoft Windows, Macintosh, Xbox 360 (through Xbox Live Arcade), and PlayStation 3 (through PlayStation Network). It was developed by Spanish studio Enigma Software Productions and published by Kalypso Media. Players control an extraterrestrial spider who has crash-landed on Earth, as he seeks to repair his spacecraft and rescue a fellow extraterrestrial spider.

Announced on 8 November 2011, Alien Spidy was published on 20 March 2013 for the Xbox 360, Microsoft Windows, and Macintosh, and on 8 May 2013 for the PlayStation 3. It received mixed reviews upon release; critics praised the game's aesthetics but found the gameplay frustrating due to imprecise controls and an unforgiving level of difficulty that hampered progression through the game.

== Gameplay ==
Alien Spidy is a physics-based platform game. Players control the eponymous Spidy, an extraterrestrial spider, and navigate him through a series of levels that are filled with deadly obstacles. Spidy can run and jump, and has the ability to shoot a web, allowing him to grapple and swing from object to object within the environment. Interspersed throughout each level are a large number of orbs, which Spidy can collect to score points. Finishing the level quickly, collecting a large number of orbs, collecting several orbs in quick succession, and finding score multipliers all increase the player's score for that level. Players can also lose points by dying, collecting certain orbs that decrease the player's score, or going for too long without collecting an orb. Players earn between one and five stars on each level, based on their score. Levels are grouped into several stages, including a forest, a pond, a cave system, and outer-space. In order to progress from one stage to the next, players must collect a certain number of stars. Players can collect special power-up orbs scattered throughout levels. These orbs allow Spidy to perform feats he is otherwise incapable of, including traveling underwater and jumping to extreme heights. Most of the game's levels take between 90 seconds and three minutes.

== Plot ==
Alien Spidy has a minimal plot. The story follows the Spidy, a spider from the planet Aracnia, who has crash-landed on Earth during an attempt to rescue a lady spider, Virgi. Spidy must locate Virgi and collect pieces of his spacecraft in order to return to Aracnia.

== Development ==
On 8 November 2011, the game was announced in a press release, with Enigma Software Productions as the developer and Kalypso Media as the publisher. The press release indicated that the game would be released in the second quarter of 2012.

Alien Spidy was advertised as a PlayStation Vita game early in its development history, with Sony using gameplay footage of the game on the Vita at a presentation at Gamescom 2011. The game was never released on that platform, however. In an interview, Enigma Software CEO Daniel Parente claimed that the game was developed for all major platforms, and after bringing Kalypso Media on board as a publisher, the latter chose which platforms to release the game on, and when. The project manager at Kalypso Media for Alien Spidy, Andrew McKerrow, noted that the developer attempted to secure a publisher by pitching the game on a large number of platforms. In a separate interview with Daniel Parente, conducted in October 2012, Enigma Software's CEO called the Xbox 360 and PlayStation 3 the game's lead platforms, stating that the game was "designed to be played with a gamepad".

It took eight months for Enigma to build the physics behind the web-based grapple and swing game mechanic. During early builds of the game, the motion was slower, but the development team sped up the movement, feeling it was truer to the character. The Sonic the Hedgehog series served as an inspiration for the game's pace. Significant effort was put into creating the game's visual style and making Spidy a relatable, charismatic character. Daniel Parente cited Limbo, Braid, and Patapon as influences for the game's aesthetics. Comics and cartoons served as influences for Spidy's design. The character was given a pair of large yellow eyes, which allowed the character to emote. Two of the legs were removed, bringing the total from eight to six, which Andrew McKerrow described as an effort to avoid triggering the fears of people with arachnophobia and "make the character a little more friendly looking and little less creepy". It was only after making these changes to Spidy that the developers decided to make Spidy an extraterrestrial, as that would justify the character design's deviations from regular spiders.

The game was delayed several times. In August 2012, the website XBLA Fans reported that the game would be delayed into the fall of that year. By October, a preview on the gaming website Twinfinite listed the release date as 31 December 2012. The game was released on the Xbox 360, Microsoft Windows, and Macintosh on 20 March 2013, and was released on the PlayStation 3 on 8 May 2013.

== Reception ==
Reception

Aggregate scores
Aggregator	Score
GameRankings	(360) 54.31% (13 reviews)^{[B]}
Metacritic	(360) 55 (19 reviews)^{[A]}

Review scores
Publication	Score
GameRevolution	3/5
GamesRadar+	2/5
Official Xbox Magazine (US)	4.5/10
Polygon	6/10

Alien Spidy received mixed reviews upon release. At Metacritic, a video game review aggregator, the Xbox 360 version of the game received an average score of 55 out of 100, based on 19 reviews.^{[A]}

The game's visuals were praised by reviewers. GamesRadar's Lorenzo Veloria opined that "Adorable characters, beautiful visuals, and upbeat music stand out as the high points of Alien Spidy". A large number of reviewers called the game and its characters "cute". While a few of the reviewers praised the game's music, Jeremy Peeples of Hardcore Gamer found that it lacked staying power. He noted, however, that the music could be muted without also muting the sound effects, allowing people to play their own music.

Critics near universally took issue with the game's controls. Critics found that the webs that they shot did not go where they wanted them to go, and multiple reviewers described navigation as "trial and error". Reviewers also found that they could not always jump when they wanted to, and one reviewer found that power-ups failed to activate when she wanted them to. Reviewers also complained that it was extremely difficult to get enough stars to progress from one stage to the next, forcing players to replay the same levels over and over again. Because points are subtracted each time Spidy dies, the problems with the control scheme exacerbate how difficult it is to get enough stars to progress.

Opinions on the game's mid-level checkpoint system were mixed. Matt Cullen of Canadian Online Gaming noted that the checkpoints meant that players were not sent too far back into the level after each death, saving time. Official Xbox Magazine's Taylor Cocke, however, noted that the checkpoints save players' point progress, meaning that players would have to start the level over if their performance wasn't good enough before they reached the checkpoint.

== Notes ==
^A Metacritic tracks ratings for each platform separately, and does not assign aggregate scores for a platform until it receives at least four reviews specific to that platform. As Metacritic only lists two reviews for the PlayStation 3 version and one review for the personal computer version, it has not issued aggregate scores for those platforms.
^B GameRankings, like Metacritic, tracks scores for each platform separately, and had only two reviews for the PlayStation 3 version and one review for the personal computer version. Unlike Metacritic, GameRankings does provide a score for platforms with too few reviews to be a true aggregate. For both the PlayStation 3 and personal computer versions, that score was 50.00%.
