= R.I.P.D. The Game =

2013 video game

- Developer: Old School Games
- Publisher: Atlus
- Engine: Saber3D Engine
- Platforms: PlayStation 3, Windows, Xbox 360
- Release: July 17, 2013
- Genre: Third-person shooter
- Modes: Cooperative, multiplayer

R.I.P.D. The Game is a co-op third-person shooter video game based on the 2013 film R.I.P.D.. It was developed by Old School Games and published by Atlus USA. It was released on July 17, 2013, for the Xbox 360, PlayStation 3 and Microsoft Windows. The gameplay is derived from Old School Games' previous game, God Mode. Players in R.I.P.D. The Game are able to play as Roy Pulsipher or Nick Walker in a cooperative horde mode gametype against renegade ghosts also known as "deadoes", who stay on earth to avoid their fate in the afterlife.

== Plot ==
R.I.P.D. The Game summarizes the events of the movie, covering Nick Walker's death, to his arrival at the afterlife law enforcement agency, the R.I.P.D. The stylized comic also introduces Nick Walker's partner, Roy Pulsipher, a nineteenth-century law enforcer who also works for the R.I.P.D. The introductory comic also informs the player of motives of the monsters, referred to as "deadoes", and depicts them stealing gold artifacts but leaves their ulterior motives a mystery. However, this is the only cutscene, and the game immediately drops the player in a tutorial afterwards.

== Gameplay ==
R.I.P.D. The Game is a third-person shooter that has players gunning down monsters called "deadoes", in a horde mode with one other player cooperatively across online matchmaking. There are seven maps for each of the seven missions and a final boss at the end of each one. Matches are composed of five rounds with each round increasing in difficulty compared to the last. Players are able to buy and upgrade weapons using in game currency. These weapons include a standard arsenal of shotguns, assault rifles, and references to the movie such as a banana or a hairdryer. Enemies can be defeated through in game firearms or by standing next to marked enemies in order to arrest them. At the end of each level, bounties are collected from surviving all five waves of enemies. The game also provides challenges for the player to complete to earn more points at the end of a match. One of the game's unique features is betting, which allows the player to bet in game currency on who will get the most points at the end of a match. The player's main way of interacting with the world is through shooting or grenades to defeat enemies, however some enemies may be marked for arrest which is done by standing near the marked enemy for the specified time limit. At the end of each round, players may buy new weapons or upgrades for existing ones. Achievements can be earned through in-game actions, which include references to the movie.

== Reception ==
Reception

Aggregate score
Aggregator	Score		
Aggregator	PC	PS3	Xbox 360
Metacritic	26/100		39/100

Review scores
Publication	Score		
Publication	PC	PS3	Xbox 360
Electronic Gaming Monthly			3/10
GameSpot	2.5/10		
IGN	4.5/10		
Official Xbox Magazine (US)			4/10

R.I.P.D. The Game received negative reviews. It holds an average of 39% and 42% on aggregate websites Metacritic and GameRankings. The majority of complaints about R.I.P.D. The Game are its lack of story, repetitive mechanics, and its similarity to Old School Game's previous entry, God Mode. In comparison with God Mode, it was referred to as an inferior reskin, as Electronic Gaming Monthly also put it, R.I.P.D. felt like God Mode's "neglected younger brother" whereas while they used the same engine and mechanics R.I.P.D. was missing some key features. According to other reviews R.I.P.D. was also downgraded in significant ways including: 2 player co-op instead of God mode's 4, slower movement, clunkier shooting, and a reduced variety of weapons.

Additionally, the game was criticized for having almost no narrative connection to the film. With GameSpot stating it ignored the movie's plot entirely, there are no cutscenes featuring the film's actors with only a brief "slideshow" at the start of the game.

Other critics were also disappointed that Ryan Reynolds and Jeff Bridges did not voice their characters. The game instead used generic "sound-alike" voice actors who repeated a small handful of one-liners, which quickly became "annoying" during repetitive gameplay.

As to the gameplay many described it as shallow and tedious, it was classified as a kind of "arena shooter" where instead of a story driven adventure it was a simple wave survival in different small arenas. Additionally, the AI was considered "brain dead", the enemies would often just run in straight lines directly at the player or get stuck in the map on simple objects which added to the critical reception.

Lastly there were 2 main technical flaws cited by critics, the "broken" matchmaking and the "bad controls. There was extreme difficulty even at launch to find co-op partners online and since the game was designed for co-op (and had no AI teammates) playing solo made the game nearly impossible. As to the controls, they were described as "stiff" and "imprecise" with other issues with mouse acceleration or input lag.
