= Mega Dead Pixel =

2013 video game

- Developer: About Fun
- Publisher: Chillingo
- Engine: Unity engine
- Platforms: iOS, Android, Windows Phone 8
- Release: iOS:17 October 2013; Android: 6 May 2014
- Genre: Endless runner
- Mode: Single-player

Mega Dead Pixel is an indie game developed by About Fun and published by Chillingo. The game had more than one million downloads during the first fourteen days after its initial release. The game was released for iOS, Android and Windows Phone. As of October 2019, the app was unavailable on the App Store and the Play Store.

== Gameplay ==
It is an infinitely running game. The player controls a pixel who is falling down and has to avoid dangerous black pixels represented by various shapes. As he avoids these pixels, his own pixel is getting bigger by collecting white pixels. Furthermore, by brushing the shapes (falling next to them), ideally in a quick succession, player scores and the mega pixel bar is getting filled up. When its filled completely, pixel becomes the Mega Pixel and demolishes everything in his way. Player can score by smashing shapes too, but that also reduces his size.

There are also coins that player has to catch. He can use them to buy some power-ups like pistols. Power-ups can also be bought for real money.

== Reception ==
The game received positive and mixed reviews. It was praised for its concept, graphics and its soundtrack. On the other hand, it was criticised for its controls, difficulty and its stereotypical gameplay.

Apple selected the game to be one of the best games of 2013. Game was selected as one of the best mobile games of 2013 in many online magazines.
