= Alien Rage =

2013 first-person shooter video game

- Developer: CI Games
- Publisher: CI Games
- Engine: Unreal Engine 3
- Platforms: Microsoft Windows; PlayStation 3 Xbox 360
- Release: Microsoft Windows; 24 September 2013; Xbox 360; 18 October 2013; PlayStation 3; 21 October 2013
- Genre: First-person shooter
- Modes: Single-player, multiplayer

Alien Rage is a 2013 first-person shooter video game for Microsoft Windows, Xbox 360 (through Xbox Live Arcade), and PlayStation 3 (through PlayStation Network) developed by CI Games, then known as City Interactive. The game has single-player and competitive multiplayer modes. In its single-player campaign, players are put in control of an elite soldier named Jack who is sent to destroy a mining facility and its aliens after they turned against and killed the humans that they had shared the facility with.

Announced as Alien Fear in April 2012, the game was renamed in May of the following year. It was released on 24 September 2013 for Windows, 18 October 2013 for the Xbox 360, and 21 October 2013 for the PlayStation 3. Alien Rage was met with mixed reviews upon release, with critics viewing the game as generic and prone to major glitches.

== Gameplay ==
Alien Rage is a first-person shooter, in which players fight through several linear levels, killing a variety of aliens. At the end of every few levels, players fight a larger alien in a boss fight. Players score points by killing a large number of aliens in a short period of time, or by killing them in special ways, such as by using explosions or shooting them in the head. These points can be used to upgrade the player character, for example by boosting his resistance to damage or by increasing the amount of ammunition that he is able to carry. Players are able to carry two weapons at a time, and also have a pistol with unlimited ammunition. The player character can use both human- and alien-manufactured weapons in the game, and alien weapons use a cool-down period instead of having to reload. Weapons in the game include assault rifles, sniper rifles, shotguns, rocket launchers, and miniguns. The game is intentionally difficult; its easiest difficulty level is called "challenging", and the next easiest difficulty level is called "hard".

The game also offers competitive multiplayer. There are two modes – deathmatch and team deathmatch – and a small number of maps. Cooperative gameplay, which was mentioned in the game's initial announcement, did not make it into the final game.

== Plot ==
Alien Rage takes place on an asteroid which humans and an alien species known as Vorus were jointly mining for Promethium, a highly efficient but extremely dangerous source of energy. After the Vorus turn on the humans and wipe the miners out for violating the agreement of not weaponizing Promethium as a planet-cracking weapon, Jack, the player character, is sent to the mining facility to kill the aliens and destroy the facility.

== Development ==
Alien Rage was first announced in early April 2012, under the name Alien Fear. The game was to be developed using Unreal Engine 3 by City Interactive's Bydgoszcz Studio, and would have a cooperative gameplay (co-op) mode. The first screenshots from the game were released two months later, in June 2012. In May 2013 the game's name was changed to Alien Rage, and two months later it was announced that the game would be released on the personal computer, Xbox 360, and PlayStation 3 on 24 September 2013. The game was eventually released on 24 September 2013 for Windows, 18 October 2013 for the Xbox 360, and 21 October 2013 for the PlayStation 3, with and ESRB rating of Mature.

== Reception ==
Reception

Aggregate scores
Aggregator	Score
GameRankings	(PC) 55.60% (360) 47.56% (PS3) 30.00%^{[A]}
Metacritic	(PC) 52 (360) 46^{[B]}

Review scores
Publication	Score
Destructoid	3/10
GameSpot	5/10
IGN	4.4/10
Official Xbox Magazine (US)	4.0/10

Alien Rage received average to poor reviews upon release. At Metacritic, a video game review aggregator, the Windows version of the game received an average score of 52 out of 100, based on 27 reviews, while the Xbox 360 version revived a score of 46, based on 10 reviews.^{[B]}

The game was heavily criticized for its lack of originality. Daniel Shannon of GameSpot remarked that "If you have played a first-person shooter made in the last 10 years, then you have already experienced most of what Alien Rage has to offer", and continued that "You've seen these weapons before, and you've shot these enemies before". Reviewers especially took issue with the lack of creativity in level design, which James Stephanie Sterling writing for Destructoid called "tedious corridors full of identical, monotonous, brainless combat encounters". Hardcore Gamer's Nikola Suprak commented that several of the levels he played through were visually indistinct from one another, before saying that "level after level of redundant action and repetitive encounters ultimately drag the game down". Critics also noted that the game had a number of technical issues. Sterling ran into two situations where glitches would not allow her to progress without restarting the level, while Sam Turner of The Digital Fix experienced dramatic drops in frame rate during gameplay, and crashed to desktop several times.

The game's multiplayer experience was received better than its single-player campaign. Writing for Gaming Nexus, Jeff Kintner said that the "multiplayer is fun, if a bit repetitive". While Kintner expressed a desire for additional, objective-based, types of multiplayer, he praised the team deathmatch mode's intensity. GameSpot's Daniel Shannon also commented on the limited number of multiplayer options, but went on to say that "For what it's worth, the action is fast-paced, and the maps are well designed for a balanced multiplayer experience."

== Notes ==
^A GameRankings tracks ratings for each platform separately. This rating is based on only one review, and therefore is not an aggregate score.
^B Metacritic tracks ratings for each platform separately, and does not assign aggregate scores for a platform until it receives at least four reviews specific to that platform. As Metacritic only lists one review for the PlayStation version, it has not issued an aggregate scores for that platform.
