= God Mode (video game) =

2013 video game

- Developers: Saber Interactive; Old School Games
- Publisher: Atlus
- Engine: Saber3D Engine
- Platforms: Microsoft Windows, PlayStation 3, Xbox 360
- Release: Windows, XBLA; April 19, 2013; PlayStation Network; April 23, 2013
- Genre: Third-person shooter
- Modes: Single-player, multiplayer

God Mode is a co-op, arena-based, third-person shooter video game focusing on survival mode style gameplay. It was developed by Saber Interactive in conjunction with Old School Games and published by Atlus for Windows, Xbox 360 (via XBLA), and PlayStation 3 (via PSN) in 2013. The game uses Saber Interactive's internal Saber3D Engine. Its gameplay was later used as basis for R.I.P.D. The Game.

== Plot ==
Playing as the descendant of an ancient-God-turned-mere-mortal by Hades, the player and up to three co-op mode friends (online or offline/LAN) must blast their way through the Maze of Hades and its demonic denizens using an arsenal of firearm weaponry and deity inspired magical 'special attacks' in order to avoid eternal damnation.

== Reception ==
Reception

Aggregate scores
Aggregator	Score
GameRankings	(PC) 61.70% (X360) 61.50% (PS3) 60.00%
Metacritic	(PC) 58/100 (X360) 58/100 (PS3) 60/100

Review score
Publication	Score
IGN	6.7/10

God Mode received a generally mixed reception from critics. Aggregate website Metacritic rated the PC version 58 out of 100 based on 16 reviews, the PlayStation 3 version 60 out of 100 based on 5 reviews, and the Xbox 360 version 58 out of 100 based on 8 reviews.

IGN reviewer Richard Corbett praised the level design and co-op, but criticized the game's technical issues and limited replay value.
