= Pac-Man Dash! =

2013 video game

- Developer: M2
- Publisher: Namco Bandai Games
- Series: Pac-Man
- Platforms: iOS, Android
- Release: July 18, 2013
- Genres: Endless runner, Platformer
- Mode: Single-player

Pac-Man Dash! is a side-scrolling endless runner-style game released for iOS and Android devices, and Adobe Flash by Namco Bandai Games as part of the Pac-Man series of games. The game's setting and design was primarily based on the CGI animated series Pac-Man and the Ghostly Adventures and contained many characters, references, and music tracks from it. The game was later removed from the App Store on March 21, 2017.

== Gameplay ==
The game had over 70 playable missions to run through and contains many unlockable transformations and vehicles for Pac-Man which can be obtained by collecting enough cookies in-game or from scanning bar-codes of Pac-Man and the Ghostly Adventures merchandise.

== Reception ==
Reception

Aggregate score
Aggregator	Score
Metacritic	67/100

Review score
Publication	Score
TouchArcade	3/5

The game received mixed to positive reviews. Metacritic gave the game a positive rating of 67 out of 100 based on 11 reviews. The game has been complimented for its entertaining value and well-polished gameplay, while some reviews have criticized its simplicity and lack of more content, but it's still marked as fun to play nonetheless.

== See also ==
- Pac-Man and the Ghostly Adventures
- List of Pac-Man video games including other Pac-Man themed applications on iOS and Android
