= Pac-Man and the Ghostly Adventures =

Animated television series

- Genre: Science fantasy; Comedy; Action; Adventure
- Based on: Pac-Man and Characters by Tōru Iwatani & Bandai Namco Entertainment
- Developed by: Tom Ruegger; Paul Rugg; Avi Arad
- Directed by: Moto Sakakibara
- Voices of: Erin Mathews; Samuel Vincent; Andrea Libman; Ian James Corlett; Ashleigh Ball; Lee Tockar; Brian Drummond; Matt Hill
- Theme music composer: Will Anderson; Avi Arad
- Opening theme: Worldwide "Pac is Back" performed by Andy Sturmer; Japan "PAC THIS WORLD!!!" by Kenichi Maeyamada (HYADAIN)
- Ending theme: "Pac is Back" (instrumental)
- Composers: Tetsuya Takahashi; Naoyuki Horiko; Shogo Ohnishi; Reiji Kitazato; Masafumi Okubo; Kuniyuki Morohashi
- Countries of origin: United States; Japan; Canada
- Original languages: English; Japanese
- No. of seasons: 2
- No. of episodes: 52 (list of episodes)

Production
- Executive producers: Avi Arad; Rick Ungar; Shukuo Ishikawa; Shin Unozawa; Junichi Yanagihara; Ken Iyadomi
- Producers: Alexandra Bland; Hisanori Oishi; Kunihisa Yagashita; Naoki Kudo
- Running time: 24 minutes
- Production companies: 41 Entertainment; Arad Productions; Bandai Namco Entertainment (Note: Known as Bandai Namco Games in episodes 1–48.); OLM Digital; Sprite Animation Studios

Original release
- Network: Disney XD (United States); Disney XD (Canada); Tokyo MX (Japan)
- Release: June 15, 2013 – May 29, 2015

Related
- Pac-Man

Pac-Man and the Ghostly Adventures, known in Japan as Pac-World, (Note: Japanese: パックワールド, Hepburn: Pakkuwārudo) is an animated television series produced by 41 Entertainment, Arad Productions, a partnership between Sprite Animation Studios and OLM, Inc., and Bandai Namco Entertainment for Tokyo MX (stereo version), BS11 (stereo version) and Disney XD (bilingual version). Based on Bandai Namco's Pac-Man video game franchise, it is the second animated series to be based upon the game franchise, following the 1982 TV series. The show aired from June 15, 2013, to May 29, 2015, running for 2 seasons and 52 episodes.

Various games and merchandise were produced based on the series, including two video games and several mobile apps.

== Production ==
A pilot trailer produced by Arad Productions was shown at E3 2010, alongside the announcement of Pac-Man Party for the Wii. The pilot explained the basic plot of the series, and visually was mostly identical to the final product. The end of the pilot features a homage to the "Coffee Break" scenes in the original arcade game. Avi Arad explained in an interview that they made Pac-Man a high-schooler in order to tell stories about being a teenager, and that they also wanted to explore Pac-Man and Pac-Land's backstory. The trailer and Pac-Man Party also debuted a new design for Pac-Man that would be used for most Pac-Man media and merchandise during the show's run.

In September 2011, 41 Entertainment was named worldwide distributor of the series except in Japan, where Namco Bandai would handle distribution. The series was titutively titled PAC-MAN 3D at the time. Avi Arad said in the press release that Pac-Man was one of his all-time favorite characters, and that the show's ghosts would come in all shapes and sizes. Following this announcement, 41 Entertainment would announce global distribution deals with various partners. The animation was done by Sprite Animation Studios in partnership with OLM, Inc., who handled the production process, from storyboard to delivery. While Arad came up with the basic plot-line for the show, the final product was directed by Motonori Sakakibara.

In some territories, the second half of season 2 was distributed as season 3.

The show ended on a cliffhanger in 2015, with 52 episodes produced in total.

== Overview ==
The series takes place on the fictional planet known as Pac-World, and Netherworld, a Hell-like landscape located under the planet's surface. The show follows the Pacster, (an alternate-universe version of Pac-Man) and his best friends, Spiral and Cylindria attend Maze High School, a boarding school in Pacopolis. They help to protect citizens from the threat of ghosts, who originate from the Netherworld. The Netherworld was originally sealed off from Pac-World until Pac-Man accidentally broke the seal between both worlds while avoiding the school bully Skeebo. Ghosts can use their slime-producing abilities to coat objects and terrorize Pac-Worlders, and are additionally able to possess the bodies of Pac-Worlders, which causes them to gain glowing red eyes. However, their possession only lasts a few minutes without the aid of mad ghostly scientist Dr. Buttocks' technology.

Pac-Man also befriends four friendly ghosts (Blinky, Pinky, Inky and Clyde) who vowed to help him in exchange for being restored to the living world. Pac-Man vows to stop the evil ruler of the Netherworld, Lord Betrayus and his ghosts from taking over Pac-World while searching for his long-lost parents, who are implied to be off the planet. The ghosts continually attack the city of Pacopolis to locate the Repository, a storage chamber for the corporeal bodies of the ghosts which would allow them to live again if they possessed them. The ghosts also attack the very lifeblood of Pac-World, the Tree of Life to prevent Pac-Man from gaining power from Power-Berries to fight them. Without the power-berries, Pac-Man, nor any Pac-Worlder is not able to fly or survive in the Netherworld.

== Cast and characters ==
Promotional concept art featuring Pac-Man, Spiral, and Cylindria

=== Main ===
- Pac-Man (voiced by Erin Mathews), Real name as "Pac" is the 13-year-old title character of the series. He is the last of the Yellow Pac-Worlders, having lost his parents to ghost-related circumstances. As a yellow Pac-Worlder, he has the ability to eat ghosts while spitting out their eyes. He is brave, kind, cheerful, loyal and compassionate, but on occasion, he is impulsive, rebellious, and immature, as well as being motivated by his absurd appetite.
- Cylindria (voiced by Andrea Libman, commonly referred to as Cyli) is a 13-year-old (15 in season 2) pink Pac-Girl with glasses and one of Pac's classmates and best friends who is the smartest of the main three. She is hot-tempered and sassy, but fundamentally sweet.
- Spiralton (voiced by Sam Vincent, commonly referred to as Spiral) is a tall red 15-year-old friendly jock and one of Pac's classmates and best friends. He is the tallest and most athletic of the three.
- Betrayus, full name Lord Betrayus Sneakerus Spheros, (voiced by Sam Vincent) is the sadistic, temperamental, and egocentric Lord of the Ghosts and the Netherworld and Spheros' brother. When alive, he tried to conquer the world, but was defeated and stripped of his corporeal form alongside his underlings. Despite his malicious personality and actions, he is also very immature and prone to childish fits when he does not get his way.
- The Ghost Gang is a group of four ghosts who live in the Netherworld and are ruled by Lord Betrayus. Despite their servitude towards Betrayus, they are secretly allies of Pac-Man and friends due to not liking having to live in the Netherworld.
  - Blinky (voiced by Ian James Corlett) is a red ghost. He is the default leader of the group, as well as the shortest. Blinky appears to be hot-tempered and cunning, but is very insecure and has a softer side.
  - Inky (voiced by Lee Tockar) is a blue ghost, the thinnest and sneakiest in the gang. He has a sibling rivalry with Blinky on account of them being twins.
  - Pinky (voiced by Ashleigh Ball) is a sassy pink ghost and the only sister. She has a crush on Pac-Man and a rivalry with Cylindria.
  - Clyde (voiced by Brian Drummond) is an orange ghost, the largest and friendliest of the siblings.

=== Pac-Worlders ===
- President Stratos Spheros (voiced by Sam Vincent) is the benevolent president of Pac-World, old friends of Pac's parents, and Betrayus' brother. He serves as a mentor to Pac-Man, Spiral, and Cylindria.
- Sir Cumference "Sir C" (voiced by Ian James Corlett) is a goofy scientist who has met Pac's father and mother. Despite his advanced age, he is very energetic and athletic, and is a brilliant, yet scatterbrained, inventor.
- Skeebo (voiced by Matt Hill) is a mean-spirited, vain, and buffoonish blue jock and school bully who torments Pac. He is Cylindria's ex-boyfriend; the two broke up for his cowardice when she was held captive by a giant ghost.
- Spheria Suprema (voiced by Ashleigh Ball) is a scrappy orange Pac-Person who is Pac-Man's aunt.
- Ms. Globular (voiced by Erin Mathews) is one of Pac-Man's teachers.
- Mr. Strictler (voiced by Mark Oliver) is a light-blue driver's ed teacher with a stubborn personality.
- Mr. Dome (voiced by Lee Tockar) is the gym teacher.
- O'Drool (voiced by Lee Tockar) is the arrogant and abrasive Secretary of Security.
- Kingpin Obtuse (voiced by Lee Tockar) is a dark-green crime lord of Pac-World's criminal underworld.
- Rotunda (voiced by Tabitha St. Germain) is an Elder who is the mother of Stratos and Betrayus.
- Zac (voiced by Ian James Corlett) He is Pac's father.
- Sunny (voiced by Ashleigh Ball) She is Pac's mother.
- The Pacinator (voiced by Ian James Corlett) is a villainous Pac-Person. It is implied that he is responsible for the disappearance of Pac's parents.
- Do-Ug (voiced by Gabe Khouth) is a Neander-Pac kid who first appeared in "Cave Pac-Man".
- Danny Vaincori (voiced by Kyle Rideout) is a movie director who first appears in "Pac-Mania".
- Elliptika "Elli" (voiced by Kazumi Evans) is a light pink Pac-Worlder who visits Pacopolis from PacTokyo and is Spheros' and Betrayus' niece.
- Moondog is a black-haired lavender Pac-Worlder who is Cylindria's father.
- Starchild is a blonde Pac-Worlder who is Cylindria's mother.
- Santa Pac (voiced by Richard Newman) is Pac-World's version of Santa Claus.
- Floofers is Elliptika's green pet dog.

=== Ghosts ===
- Butt-ler (voiced by Brian Drummond) is Betrayus' long-suffering servant and butler whose forehead resembles a pair of buttocks.
- Dr. A.H. Buttocks (voiced by Brian Drummond) is the Netherworld's greatest mad scientist and Butt-ler's older twin brother who takes every opportunity to bully Butt-ler.
- Glooky (real name as Funky in the game series) is a green Ghost with a squint in his left eye. He is a friend of Blinky.
- Mavis is an orange female Ghost.
- Specter (voiced by Brendon Ryan Barrett) is a ghost spy who works for Betrayus.
- Fred is a white ghost who was used as a flag due to the lack of white clothes.
- Master Goo (voiced by Vincent Tong) is a Ninja Ghost.
- Captain Banshee is a ghost pirate who first appears in "Cap'n Banshee and his Interstellar Buccaneers".
- Cyclops Ghosts (voiced by Lee Tockar) are heavyset Ghosts with one eye and three horns.
- Ogle (voiced by Brian Drummond) is a Cyclops Ghost who works as a chef.
- Fire Ghosts are orange Ghosts who can emit fire from their body.
- Ice Ghosts are blue Ghosts who can emit ice from their body.
- Tentacle Ghosts (voiced by Lee Tockar) are four-eyed purple Ghosts who look similar to an octopus.
- Guardian Ghosts are large Ghosts who guard the Netherworld.
- Aqua Ghosts are light blue Ghosts with fins on their head.
- Drill-Bit Ghosts are Ghosts who have drill bits on their heads.
- Alien Ghosts are Ghosts who live on the Ghosteroid.
- Ghosteroid is an asteroid ghost who Dr. Buttocks once brought near Pac-World.
- Ghost Sharks are ghostly sharks who reside in the waters of PacLantis and guard the Berry of Youth.
- Virus Ghosts are normal ghosts who have been digitised by a Dr. Buttocks invention.

=== Pointy Heads ===
- Apex (voiced by Colin Murdock) is an evil strange mysterious overlord.
- Professor Pointybrains (voiced by Brian Drummond) is a scientist who assists Apex.
- Tip (voiced by Gabe Khouth) is a strong minion who first appears in "Cosmic Contest".

=== Robots ===
- Grinder is a lab assistant Sir Cumference made for himself.
- Grindette is Grinder's wife who first appeared in "The Bride of Grinder".
- Grinder-Tron is a giant robot made by Dr. Buttocks who resembles an evil version of Grinder.
- Mega-Grinder is a giant robot build by Pac-Man.
- Computer Bug is a small antivirus bug who helps Pac-Man rid the computer systems of the evil virus ghosts.
- Pac-Topus is a giant mechanical octopus.

=== Others ===
- Madame Ghoulasha (voiced by Kathleen Barr) is a warty Nether-witch from the Netherworld.
- Count Pacula (voiced by Sam Vincent) is a villainous vam-pac from the Netherworld.
- Jean (voiced by Nicole Oliver) is a vile genie who first appeared in "Meanie Genie".
- Overlords of the Outer Regions are a group of strange and unknown celestial beings who take the form of a burst of light.
- Mooby is an ancient giant flying Pac-Cow who lives up in the sky in Pac-World.
- The Easter Pac-Peep (voiced by Ashleigh Ball) is a humanoid marshmallow chicken made of marshmallow and the owner of Easter Egg Island.
- Dentures of Doom (voiced by Paul Dobson) are a set of living dentures originally owned by an ancient mummy wizard.
- Mummy Wizard (voiced by Paul Dobson) is a strange humanoid wizard with a mummy-like appearance.
- Round Deer are flying reindeer who pull Santa Pac's sled and have special fighting abilities.
- Dr. Pacenstein is a talking brain housed in glass who lives in Transylpacia Castle.

=== Monsters ===
- Fluffy is a giant poodle.
- Fuzbitz (voiced by Lee Tockar) is Sir Cumference's pet monster.
- Gargoyles are large, heavy-set blue monsters with three eyes and small wings.
- Slug-cams are used by Betrayus to spy on Pac-World.
- Pac-Dragons are one-eyed red dragons who live in the Netherworld.
- Stalkers is a black medium-sized monster with two legs, a long eel-like body, and a multi-eyed face full of sharp teeth.
- Venus Dragon Flytraps are large carnivorous plants indigenous to the Netherworld.
- Monobats are a race of one-eyed bats.
- Stone Temple Guardians are giant statues who guard a slime-filled temple.
- Pacosaurus refers to a type of ancient dinosaur which originally roamed Pac-World.
- Were-Pac Flea is a Netherworld flea made by Dr. Buttocks.
- Space Worm is a giant worm who lives in space and has the ability to send victims to other dimensions.
- Hugefoot is a monster with an enormous foot.

== Music ==
The "Pac is Back" theme song features sound effects and melodies from the original arcade game, and other pieces of music from older Pac-Man games are remixed and used in the show. Some action sequences feature a remix of "Pac-Man's Park" from Pac-Mania (Which itself is based on the cutscene theme from the original Pac-Man arcade game). This remix was also featured in the mobile game Pac-Man Dash!.

Meanwhile, the Japanese dub of the show has a different theme song named "PAC THIS WORLD!!!" by Kenichi Maeyamada (a.k.a. Hyadain).

== Episodes ==
Season	Episodes	Original airdates	
Season	Episodes	First aired	Last aired
1	26	June 15, 2013	November 9, 2013
2	26	June 9, 2014	May 29, 2015

== Crew ==
- Avi Arad – Developer and executive producer
- Sean Catherine Derek – Story editor
- David Earl – Storyboard artist
- Tetsuya Ishii – Lead character designer
- Terry Klassen – Voice director (ep. 3–52)
- Masashi Kobayashi – Line producer
- Tatsuro Maruyama – Art director
- Masafumi Mima – Sound director
- Tom Ruegger – Creator, developer, writer
- Paul Rugg – Creator, developer, writer
- Kris Zimmerman – Voice director (ep. 1–2)

== Development ==
The series was tentatively called Pac-Man 3D and later Pac-Man: The Adventure Begins. On September 26, 2011, 41 Entertainment was named worldwide distributor for the series and that the series would be finished for a Fall 2013 window.

== Merchandise ==
41 Entertainment signed many deals for merchandising, including a fast food deal with Burger King and a building toy license with K'nex excluding Japan.

== Broadcast ==
=== United States ===
On February 29, 2012, 41 named Disney XD as the US broadcaster for the series. The series debuted on June 15, 2013, and it continued to air on the network until 2016.

On July 1, 2017, reruns of the series began broadcasting on the KidsClick block as one of its launch programmes, and aired on the block until its discontinuation in March 2019.

On July 7, 2019, Discovery Family picked up rights to several of 41 Entertainment's shows, including Pac-Man and the Ghostly Adventures. The show aired on the channel from November 16, 2019, to August 27, 2023.

The series aired reruns on the English-language Latino channel Primo TV until 2025.

=== Japan ===
The series premiered on April 5, 2014, on Tokyo MX and BS11 in Japan.

=== Canada ===
The series premiered on March 17, 2014, on Disney XD, and was retained following the network's rebrand as Family Chrgd on October 9, 2015, and the rebrand to WildBrainTV on March 1, 2022.

The series stopped airing reruns in 2022.

=== International ===
On June 26, 2013, British Sky Broadcasting acquired the 2D and 3D broadcast rights for the series in the United Kingdom. On November 15, 2013, the 2D rights transitioned from Sky to Disney XD and later premiered on the network on January 11, 2014. Sky 3D would air the series within the same time as well.

In October 2012, it was confirmed that Network Ten would air the series in Australia.

On February 7, 2013, Clan and Canal Panda picked up the free and pay-TV rights to the series in Spain for a summer 2013 window on the latter and a January 2014 window for the former. The series premiered on Clan on January 16, 2014.

On March 29, 2013, CTC acquired the free-TV rights for the series in Russia.

On September 10, 2013, Gulli and Canal J picked up the free and pay-TV rights to the series in France for a Fall 2013 window.

On September 17, 2013, MBC3 picked up the rights for select MENA regions.

On November 15, 2013, 41 granted Disney EMEA various TV rights for the series. Disney XD acquired the pay-TV rights for Series 1 in the United Kingdom, Ireland and Nordic territories with an option for the second series if needed, while Disney XD and Disney Channel acquired the pay and free-TV rights to both seasons in Germany.

In the Philippines, it aired on Disney Channel on March 3 and ended on October 30, 2014, to give way for the special programming of "Monstober". It returned to air on March 2, 2015.

On October 5, 2015, the series premiered on Discovery Kids in Latin America (except Brazil, which aired on Gloob instead).

== DVD releases ==
=== North America ===
On February 7, 2013, 41 Entertainment appointed Phase 4 Films as North American Home Entertainment distributor for the series.

The first release - "The Adventure Begins" was released on January 7, 2014, and solely contained the first episode of the series.

These releases were followed on with volumed DVDs containing four episodes each: "Pac is Back!" (Released in January 2014), "All You Can Eat" (Released in January 2014), "Ghost Patrol" (Released in March 2014), "Let the Games Begin", and "A Berry Scary Night" (Released in September 2014), "Jurassic Pac", "Movie 4-Pac" and a collection containing four or eight DVDs were also followed up.

There were also two DVDs each with three episodes that was released exclusively to Redbox: "Indiana Pac and the Temple of Slime", and "Mission Impacable!". An additional release: "Pac to the Future", was exclusively sold at Redbox Canada.

=== Australian releases ===
There have been two DVD releases in Australia. These were released in Australia on October 2, 2013. The current releases in Australia are:

1. Pac-Man and the Ghostly Adventures: The Adventure Begins, the first DVD release containing the first 6 episodes
2. Pac-Man and the Ghostly Adventures: Pac to the Future, which contains another 6 episodes.

=== German/Austria/Switzerland releases ===
On May 1, 2014, 41 Entertainment named Universal Pictures Germany as the distributor for the series in DACH countries.

The first six volumes were released on October 10, 2014, with volumes seven and eight releasing on March 15, 2015. Each DVD contained two episodes from the series with only German audio.

=== Japan ===
11 DVDs of the series were released for rental by Bandai Visual between 2014 and 2015, each containing five episodes.

== Video games ==
Several video games based on the show have been developed. An endless runner for iOS and Android titled Pac-Man Dash! was released in July 2013. This is also hosted for free in Canada on the CHRGD website. In 2017, Pac-Man Dash! was discontinued and removed from digital storefronts.

A 3D platformer with the same name as the TV series was released for Wii U, PlayStation 3, Xbox 360, and Windows PC in late 2013, accompanied by a 2D platformer for the Nintendo 3DS shortly after. A sequel was released in October 2014. Characters from the show have also appeared in the compilation release for PlayStation 3, Xbox 360, and Windows PC, titled Pac-Man Museum. The compilation was delisted in 2020.
