= 4 Pics 1 Word =

2013 video game for mobile

- App icon
- Developers: RedSpell (iOS); LOTUM GmbH (iOS/Android)
- Publishers: RedSpell (iOS); LOTUM GmbH (iOS/Android)
- Platforms: Android, iOS
- Release: February 22, 2013
- Genre: Word game
- Modes: Single-player, multiplayer

4 Pics 1 Word is a 2013 word puzzle game created by LOTUM GmbH and released for iOS and Android.

Screenshot showing switch for in-game ads in lower left corner

== Gameplay ==
4 Pics 1 Word's gameplay is very simple: each level displays four pictures linked by one word; the player's aim is to work out what the word is, from a set of letters given below the pictures. Players will find themselves seeing commonalities between two or three photos but being unable to figure out the linking word. This game has endless content and daily challenges that will keep players coming back. The game is said to follow the freemium model: although the game is free, microtransactions are available to help the user progress through the game more quickly.

== Effect on cheating ==
The game is written from an English dialect perspective, as well as contains some unfamiliar words, causing some people to turn to cheating sites or apps to get the correct answers.

== Reception ==
4 Pics 1 Word has received mostly positive reviews. PC Advisor gave the Android version 4/5, praising its entertainment value, but stating that the social aspect could be improved. Pocket-lint featured it as their "App of the Day" on February 25, 2013, praising both its simplicity, and its social aspect. What Mobile also gave it 4/5, praising its simplicity and execution, whilst criticizing its frequency of highlighting the "hint" button.

There is also a German version of the game called 4 Bilder 1 Wort and a Spanish one called 4 Fotos 1 Palabra.
