= Jūbei =

Origin
- Origin: Japan

Jūbei is a Japanese given name, which may refer to:

- Akechi Mitsuhide, Japanese daimyō who betrayed Oda Nobunaga
- Yagyū Jūbei Mitsuyoshi (柳生 十兵衞 三厳; 1607–1650), Japanese samurai

== Characters ==
- Jimushi Juubei, a character in the novel The Kouga Ninja Scrolls and its adaptations
- Jubei Kibagami, a character in Ninja Scroll: The Series
- Satoshi Hasashi, a character in Mortal Kombat Legacy web series anthology
- Jubei, a character in the BlazBlue series
- Jubei, a Henchmen in Evil Genius (video game) and Evil Genius 2 games.
- Shigekura Jūbei, a character in Rurouni Kenshin
- Jubei Yamada, a character in the Fatal Fury video games
- Yagyu Jubei, a character from the light novel and anime Hyakka Ryōran Samurai Girls.
- Jubei Yagyu, a character in the game Onimusha 2: Samurai's Destiny.
- Jubei, a character in the game Ghost of Yōtei.

== Other ==
- Jubei-chan: The Ninja Girl

== See also ==
- Jubei Yagyu (disambiguation)
