= Space Hulk: Vengeance of the Blood Angels =

1995 video game

- Developers: Key Game (3DO); Krisalis (SS, PS, PC)
- Publisher: Electronic Arts
- Composer: James Hannigan
- Series: Warhammer 40,000
- Platforms: 3DO, PlayStation, Sega Saturn, Microsoft Windows
- Release: 3DO: EU: 1995; NA: January 1, 1996; PlayStation: EU: January 7, 1996; NA: 1996; Sega Saturn, Windows: NA: July 3, 1996 (Windows); NA: 1996; EU: 27 September, 1996 (Saturn)
- Genre: Real-time tactical first-person shooter
- Modes: Single-player, multiplayer

Space Hulk: Vengeance of the Blood Angels is a video game published by Electronic Arts in 1995 for the 3DO, which was later ported to PlayStation, Sega Saturn, and Microsoft Windows. It is based on Games Workshop's board game Space Hulk and is the sequel to the 1993 video game Space Hulk. Like its predecessor, Vengeance of the Blood Angels combines first-person shooter gameplay with real-time tactical elements. Space Hulk: Vengeance of the Blood Angels is part of the Warhammer 40,000 universe.

== Plot and setting ==
The game is set in the fictional universe of Warhammer 40,000, in the 41st millennium. In the game, humanity has been expanding for 20,000 years throughout the galaxy, aided by a phenomenal invention known as the Warp Drive, which allows substantial spatial distances to be traversed in hours. Under the auspices of the Emperor, a psychic so powerful he is essentially immortal, a pan-galactic Imperium has been established in which humanity has spread and prospered. The defenders of the Imperium are the Adeptus Astartes, or Space Marines, bio-genetically engineered warriors of superhuman prowess, ever vigilant to destroy the many threats that face humanity across the cosmos.

The player is one such Space Marine, belonging to one of the oldest and most honorable Chapters known as the Blood Angels, whose battle honors date back as long as the Imperium has existed. The player is assigned to the Terminator company. Among the thousand warriors that compose a Space Marine Chapter, only the hundred most courageous and gifted brothers are deemed worthy enough of this honor. Terminators are the Chapter's ultimate warriors. They are protected by suits that make them impervious to conventional weaponry and armed with the most devastating weaponry available.

Among the most insidious of humanity's enemies are Genestealers, a strange and terrifying alien race. They are substantial armored six-limbed beasts, preternaturally swift and unbelievably ferocious in combat. A Genestealer knows no fear, charging into battle irrespective of any threat to its life. Genestealers are incapable of reproducing amongst themselves and must rely on other races to expand their population.

Upon encountering a suitable host, such as a human being, a Genestealer fixes its eyes upon it, mesmerizing it. While the host is hypnotized, the Genestealer deposits an egg-like cell that contains the Genestealer's genetic profile. This cell behaves like cancer, altering the host's genetic profile. The victim gains some of the Genestealer's remarkable strength, resilience, and longevity, becoming healthier than he was before. The offspring of any victim is born as a Hybrid, an evil creature exhibiting characteristics of both Genestealer and host species. The Hybrid similarly passes on its genetic profile to its Purestrain parent. This cycle continues, with each new generation of Hybrid resembling the host species more closely. By the fourth generation, the offspring is barely detectable as an alien, save a few giveaway signs, such as unnaturally sharp teeth and a purplish tinge to the skin. This fourth-generation procreates conventionally and can result in either a Hybrid, a regular member of the host species, or a Purestrain Genestealer, the only way Purestrains can reproduce. All generations are linked in a psychic community, so Purestrains, Hybrids, and hosts conceive of themselves as constituents of the same brood.

How Genestealers carry out their reproductive process is of exceptional danger to the Imperium, as whole planets can fall to the Genestealer threat; the affected humans look and act no different from usual, and the hosts are incredibly secretive about the insidious curse they bear. Indeed, by the time an external agency knows about the presence of Genestealers, the whole planet may have been affected by the curse, requiring total cleansing and repopulation. Imperial authorities are thus extremely keen to terminate the Genestealer menace at the source before it can affect any nearby planet.

The way Genestealers came into contact with humanity was through using Space Hulks. These are spaceships of human origin that have become lost in Warpspace, either through a malfunction of the ship's Warp Drive or as a consequence of travelling in a medium as uncertain as Warpspace. The human occupants having died, Genestealers and their Hybrid brood move in, settling down to hibernation until the drifting Space Hulk comes into contact with a species riper for infiltration and domination.

It is that whenever a Space Hulk is detected in the proximity of a human planet, the stalwart warriors of the Space Marines are detached to rid the Hulk of its Genestealer cargo, preventing any chance of another planet falling victim to the Genestealer curse. Such is the combat prowess of the Genestealer that only the Terminator squads have met with any success. That is the player's status and mission: rid the galaxy of the Genestealer menace once and for all.

== Gameplay ==
In the initial stages of the game, the player controls a Terminator and is given orders by their commanding officer that they must follow. As missions are completed and the story progresses, the player increases in rank and will subsequently have control of the squad or squads where there are more than five terminators under their command. The enemies featured in this title include the Genestealer as well as Hybrids, Chaos Space Marines, Magus, and Patriarchs making their appearances from the middle through to the later stages of the Campaign game mode. The Genestealers are the only enemy fought in all stages of the campaign.

Space Hulk: Vengeance of the Blood Angels, in addition to the main campaign storyline, has four training missions and thirty-four solo missions spread across three main categories: Space Hulk Originals, Classic Missions, and Famous Missions. All of these levels were also featured in the game's ten-player network mode, available over TCP or IPX networks, with an additional six missions playable in either a cooperative or a special 'death-match' scenario. In this scenario, players compete to kill the largest number of Genestealers to win the game.

=== Game modes ===
In the Adeptus Ministorum of the Blood Angels, there is a chamber steeped in the history of the Chapter, tended by the mightiest Librarians, and psychic brothers charged with preserving the spiritual sanctity of the Chapter. Only the most worthy Space Marines are permitted entry. Those applicants who wish to bear the honor of Terminator Armour must first undergo the Vigil, a state of deep psychic trance that allows the Space Marine to experience the lives and actions of the greatest warriors that have served the Chapter. During the Vigil, the Space Marine will experience visions and dreams of past glories and defeats, allowing him to take command of long-dead warriors as they fight on through eternity. If the initiate is accepted by the spirits of his ancient brethren, he will emerge a full day and night later a newly ordained Space Marine Terminator, ready to face real combat.

Space Hulk: Vengeance of the Blood Angels features numerous game modes including a long and challenging single-player campaign. In addition to this, there are four training missions as well as thirty-four solo missions spread across three categories.

The Space Hulk Originals are missions that are based on the original Space Hulk board game, they are among the easier missions that the player can play and should serve as the perfect introductory levels to help newcomers hone their skills due to their considerably relaxed winning conditions.

The missions that make up the Space Hulk Originals are Suicide Mission, Exterminate, Rescue, Cleanse And Burn, Decoy, and Defend.

The Classic Missions are a selection of six missions that were part of the original Space Hulk game released on the PC and the Amiga 500. These missions are noticeably harder than the Space Hulk Originals, usually with very strict win conditions. These conditions range from requiring the Terminators to travel from one side of the Space Hulk to the other whilst not losing a single life to the Genestealers, to missions that are so broad in scale they test the player's concentration, planning, and resolve.

The missions that make up the Classic Missions are Purify, Swarm, Baneful Foe, The Perimeter, Tech Support, and Honour On Trial.

The Famous Missions chronicle the achievements of the most heroic Terminators of the past. Mastery of these missions will prepare the player for the ultimate challenge the player will face in the Campaign. The missions are split up into a further six sub-menus.

== Reception ==
Reception

Review scores
Publication	Score
AllGame	3/5 (SAT)
Electronic Gaming Monthly	6.625/10 (3DO); 6.375/10 (PS1)
Next Generation	4/5 (3DO); 3/5 (PS1, SAT)
Arcane	8/10
Maximum	4/5 (3DO, PS1)
Sega Saturn Magazine	90% (SAT)

The game's original release for the 3DO divided critics, who generally applauded or jeered the game based on their level of patience for its complex strategic gameplay. A reviewer for Next Generation praised the new twists on the first-person shooter formula and summarized that "This title looks great, moves well, and when a demon dies, it splatters the walls with its innards. Very cool." The four reviewers of Electronic Gaming Monthly said that the game is far too difficult, but that they greatly enjoyed both the intense strategic gameplay and impressive graphics for the brief moments before their player character was killed each time. Scary Larry of GamePro was impressed with the graphics, sound effects, and eerie voice overs, but criticized that the game-play is too complicated and cerebral, remarking that "throwing technical missions and multiple Terminators into the fray only serves to clog the alien homicide with hulking game-play." Maximum instead praised the gameplay, saying it "requires sharp thinking and pure tactics. Missions are extensive and are precisely ordered, needing troopers placed in the position to fight off impending alien forces." They called it "one of the most substantial titles on the 3DO". Andy Butcher reviewed Space Hulk: Vengeance of the Blood Angels for Arcane magazine. Butcher declared: "Vengeance of the Blood Angels is superior to its predecessor in almost every respect. The main reason for this is that the structure of the game itself has remained largely unchanged and, rather than trying to 're-invent the wheel', the designers have stuck with what works and improved upon it."

Reviewing the PlayStation version in GamePro, Air Hendrix called it "a port of an outdated PC game ... a stuffy combination of strategy and Doom-style shooting." He elaborated that "All 43 missions feel the same after a while, and neither the shooting nor the strategic planning ever becomes engrossing." Daniel Jevons of Maximum acknowledged that "the levels seem flat and repetitive, and the action moves at a crawl when compared to Doom's sprint", but pointed out that the game is not meant to be a Doom clone, and on closer examination is a complex and engrossing strategy game. He also was pleased that the PlayStation version "retains all the strengths (and weaknesses) of the 3DO original." Electronic Gaming Monthly's reviewers had a generally positive reaction, saying the strategy elements make it far more than just a "Doom clone" and that they were especially impressed with the level of anxiety evoked by the game. However, most of them commented that the slow pace is an annoyance, even as they acknowledged that the game would have been unplayable at a faster pace. A reviewer for Next Generation praised the game's innovative strategic game-play but argued that the PlayStation version is not as good as the 3DO original, citing a lack of additional content, choppier animation, a slower pace, and the way that the player-controlled unit straightens itself out in the wrong direction whenever it bumps into a wall. He concluded that "if you like a heavy dose of atmosphere and a little strategy mixed in with the action, Space Hulk delivers."

Rad Automatic commented in Sega Saturn Magazine that elements like the commanding and positioning of troops, complex level layouts, and sniping leave the game with only a superficial similarity to other first-person shooters. He was very pleased with the amount of thought required to succeed in the game, and commented, "If you're low on patience you may find this a little trying at first, but once you've got the hang of controlling everything at once you'll be surprised you ever thought of Space Hulk as slow-moving." He also praised the graphics and the varied rooms found on the ship. A Next Generation critic summarized, "More shooter than Defcon 5, but less action than Doom, Space Hulk is a well-balanced blend."

The game was awarded the 3DO Strategy/Puzzle Game of the Year. In 1996, GamesMaster ranked the 3DO version 3rd on their "The GamesMaster 3DO Top 10."
