= Demis Hassabis =

British AI researcher (born 1976)

Sir Demis Hassabis CBE FRS FREng FRSA
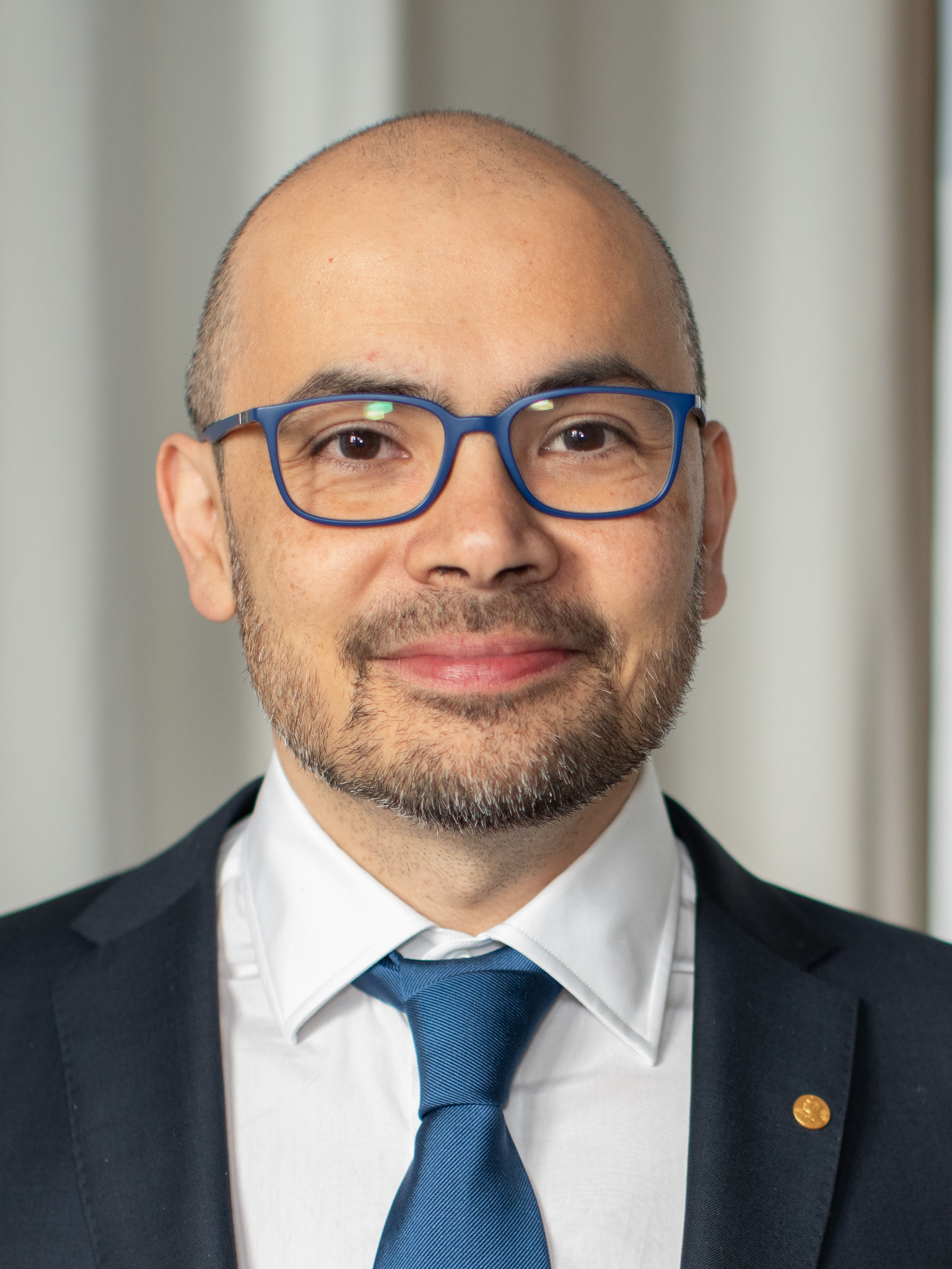
- Hassabis in 2024
- Pronunciation: /ˈdɛ.mɪs/ DE-mis /hɑːˈsɑː.bis/ hah-SAH-bees
- Born: 27 July 1976 (age 50); London, England, UK
- Education: University of Cambridge (MA); University College London (PhD)
- Known for: DeepMind; AlphaGo; AlphaFold
- Awards: Albert Lasker Award for Basic Medical Research (2023); Breakthrough Prize in Life Sciences (2023); Canada Gairdner International Award (2023); Nobel Prize in Chemistry (2024)
- Scientific career
- Fields: Neuroscience; Computer science; Artificial intelligence
- Workplaces: University College London (2009–2012); DeepMind (2010–present); Isomorphic Labs (2021–present)
- Thesis: Neural Processes Underpinning Episodic Memory (2009)
- Doctoral advisor: Eleanor Maguire
- Chess career
- Country: England
- Title: Candidate Master
- Years active: 1988–2019
- FIDE rating: 2220 (March 2019)
- Peak rating: 2300 (January 1990)

Sir Demis Hassabis (born 27 July 1976) is a British artificial intelligence (AI) researcher and entrepreneur. He is the chairman and co-founder of Google DeepMind and the chief scientist of Alphabet, as well as the chief executive officer and co-founder of Isomorphic Labs. Hassabis is also a UK Government AI Adviser. In 2024, Hassabis and John M. Jumper were jointly awarded the Nobel Prize in Chemistry for their AI research contributions to protein structure prediction.

Hassabis is a Fellow of the Royal Society and has won awards for his research efforts, including the Breakthrough Prize, the Canada Gairdner International Award and the Lasker Award. He was appointed a CBE in 2017, and knighted in 2024 for his work on AI. He was also listed among the Time 100 most influential people in the world in 2017 and 2025, and was one of the "Architects of AI" collectively chosen as Time's 2025 Person of the Year.

== Early life and education ==
Hassabis was born to Costas and Angela Hassapis. His father is a Greek Cypriot and his mother is a Chinese Singaporean. Demis grew up in North London. His original surname was "Hassapis" (Greek: Χασάπης), meaning "butcher" in Greek, but he later, according to Ingo Althöfer, "executed a point mutation by changing ‘p’ to ‘b’". One of his younger brothers still carries the original surname.

In his early career, he was a video game AI programmer and designer, and an expert board games player. A child prodigy in chess from the age of four, when he first learnt chess by watching his father playing against his uncle, Hassabis reached master standard at the age of 13 with an Elo rating of 2300 and captained many of the England junior chess teams. He represented the University of Cambridge in the Oxford–Cambridge varsity chess matches of 1995, 1996 and 1997, winning a half blue.

He first got interested in technology after buying his first computer in 1984, a ZX Spectrum 48K, funded from chess winnings. He taught himself how to program from books. He subsequently wrote his first AI program on a Commodore Amiga to play the reversi board game.

Between 1988 and 1990, Hassabis was educated at Queen Elizabeth's School, Barnet, a boys' grammar school in North London. He was subsequently home-schooled by his parents for a year, before studying at the comprehensive school of Christ's College in East Finchley. He completed his A-level exams two years early at 16.

=== Bullfrog Productions ===
Asked by Cambridge University to take a gap year owing to his young age, Hassabis began his computer games career at Bullfrog Productions after entering an Amiga Power "Win-a-job-at-Bullfrog" competition. He began by playtesting on Syndicate and then at 17 co-designing and lead-programming on the 1994 game Theme Park, with the game's designer Peter Molyneux. Theme Park, a simulation video game, sold several million copies and inspired a whole genre of simulation sandbox games. Despite being offered a seven-figure sum to remain in the games industry, he turned it down. He earned enough from his gap year to pay his own way through university.

=== University of Cambridge ===
Hassabis left Bullfrog to study at Queens' College, Cambridge, where he completed the Computer Science Tripos and graduated in 1997 with a double first.

== Career and research ==
=== Lionhead ===
After graduating from Cambridge, Hassabis worked at Lionhead Studios. Games designer Peter Molyneux, with whom Hassabis had worked at Bullfrog Productions, had recently founded the company. At Lionhead, Hassabis worked as lead AI programmer on the 2001 god game Black & White.

=== Elixir Studios ===
Hassabis left Lionhead in 1998 to found Elixir Studios, a London-based independent games developer, signing publishing deals with Eidos Interactive, Vivendi Universal and Microsoft. In addition to managing the company, Hassabis served as executive designer of the games Republic: The Revolution and Evil Genius. Each received BAFTA nominations for their interactive music scores, created by James Hannigan.

The release of Elixir's first game, Republic: The Revolution, a highly ambitious and unusual political simulation game, was delayed due to its huge scope, which involved an AI simulation of the workings of an entire fictional country. The final game was reduced from its original vision and greeted with lukewarm reviews, receiving a Metacritic score of 62/100. Evil Genius, a tongue-in-cheek Austin Powers parody, fared much better with a score of 75/100. In April 2005 the intellectual property and technology rights were sold to various publishers and the studio was closed.

=== Neuroscience research ===
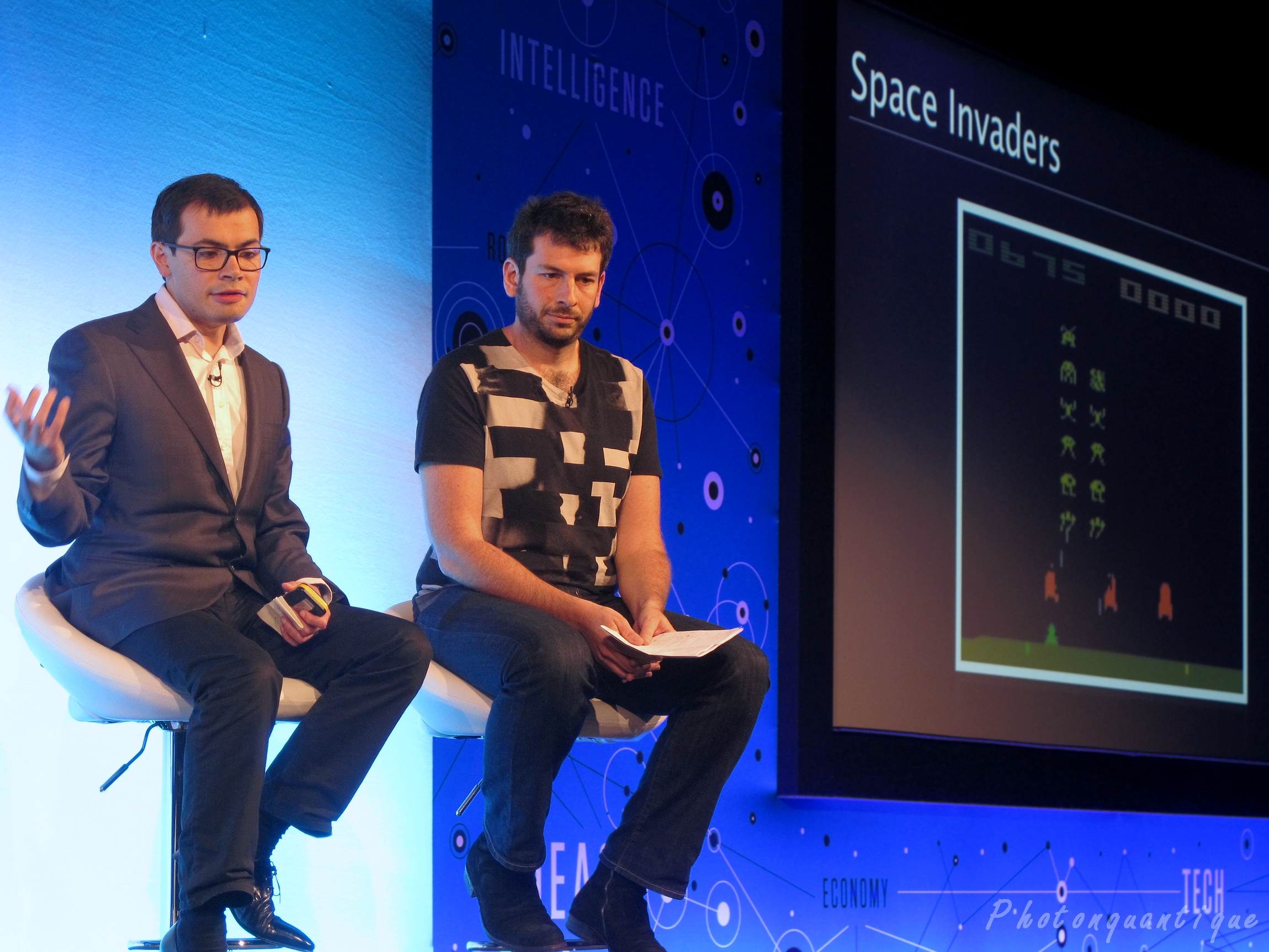
Hassabis (left) with Blaise Agüera y Arcas (right) in 2014, at the Wired conference in London

Following Elixir Studios, Hassabis returned to academia to obtain his PhD degree in cognitive neuroscience from UCL Queen Square Institute of Neurology in 2009 supervised by Eleanor Maguire. He sought to find inspiration in the human brain for new AI algorithms.

He continued his neuroscience and artificial intelligence research as a visiting scientist jointly at Massachusetts Institute of Technology (MIT), in the lab of Tomaso Poggio, and Harvard University, before earning a Henry Wellcome postdoctoral research fellowship to the Gatsby Computational Neuroscience Unit at UCL in 2009 working with Peter Dayan.

Working in the field of imagination, memory, and amnesia, he co-authored several influential papers published in Nature, Science, Neuron, and PNAS. His very first academic work, published in PNAS, was a landmark paper that showed systematically for the first time that patients with damage to their hippocampus, known to cause amnesia, were also unable to imagine themselves in new experiences. The finding established a link between the constructive process of imagination and the reconstructive process of episodic memory recall. Based on this work and a follow-up functional magnetic resonance imaging (fMRI) study, Hassabis developed a new theoretical account of the episodic memory system identifying scene construction, the generation and online maintenance of a complex and coherent scene, as a key process underlying both memory recall and imagination. This work received widespread coverage in the mainstream media and was listed in the top 10 scientific breakthroughs of the year by the journal Science. He later generalised these ideas to advance the notion of a 'simulation engine of the mind' whose role it was to imagine events and scenarios to aid with better planning.

=== DeepMind ===
Hassabis co-founded the machine learning company DeepMind in 2010 with Shane Legg and Mustafa Suleyman. He served as its CEO until 2026, when he became Alphabet's chief scientist.

Hassabis met Legg when both were postdocs at the Gatsby Computational Neuroscience Unit, and he and Suleyman had been friends through family. Hassabis also recruited his university friend and Elixir partner David Silver.

DeepMind's mission is to "solve intelligence" and then use intelligence "to solve everything else". More concretely, DeepMind aims to combine insights from systems neuroscience with new developments in machine learning and computing hardware to unlock increasingly powerful general-purpose learning algorithms that will work towards the creation of an artificial general intelligence (AGI). The company has focused on training learning algorithms to master games, and in December 2013 it announced that it had made a pioneering breakthrough by training an algorithm called a Deep Q-Network (DQN) to play Atari games at a superhuman level by using only the raw pixels on the screen as inputs.

DeepMind's early investors included several high-profile tech entrepreneurs. In 2014, Google purchased DeepMind for £400 million. Although most of the company has remained an independent entity based in London, DeepMind Health has since been directly incorporated into Google Health.

Since the Google acquisition, the company has notched up a number of significant achievements, perhaps the most notable being the creation of AlphaGo, a program that defeated world champion Lee Sedol at the complex game of Go. Go had been considered a holy grail of AI, for its high number of possible board positions and resistance to existing programming techniques. However, AlphaGo beat European champion Fan Hui 5–0 in October 2015 before winning 4–1 against former world champion Lee Sedol in March 2016 and winning 3–0 against the world's top-ranked player Ke Jie in 2017. Additional DeepMind accomplishments include creating a neural Turing machine, reducing the energy used by the cooling systems in Google's data centres by 40%, and advancing research on AI safety.

DeepMind has also been responsible for technical advances in machine learning, having produced a number of award-winning papers. In particular, the company has made significant advances in deep learning and reinforcement learning, and pioneered the field of deep reinforcement learning which combines these two methods. Hassabis has predicted that artificial intelligence will be "one of the most beneficial technologies of mankind ever" but that significant ethical issues remain.

Hassabis has also warned of the potential dangers and risks of AI if misused, and has been a strong advocate of further AI safety research being needed. In 2023, he signed the statement that "Mitigating the risk of extinction from AI should be a global priority alongside other societal-scale risks such as pandemics and nuclear war". He considers however that a pause on AI progress would be very hard to enforce worldwide, and that the potential benefits (e.g. for health and against climate change) make it worth continuing. He said that there is an urgent need for research on evaluation tests that measure how capable and controllable new AI models are.

==== AlphaFold ====
In 2016, DeepMind turned its artificial intelligence to protein structure prediction, a 50-year grand challenge in science, to predict the 3D structure of a protein from its 1D amino acid sequence. This is an important problem in biology, as proteins are essential to life, almost every biological function depends on them, and the function of a protein is thought to be related to its structure. Knowing the structure of a protein can be very helpful in drug discovery and disease understanding. In December 2018, DeepMind's tool AlphaFold won the 13th Critical Assessment of Techniques for Protein Structure Prediction (CASP) by successfully predicting the most accurate structure for 25 out of 43 proteins. "This is a lighthouse project, our first major investment in terms of people and resources into a fundamental, very important, real-world scientific problem", Hassabis said to The Guardian.

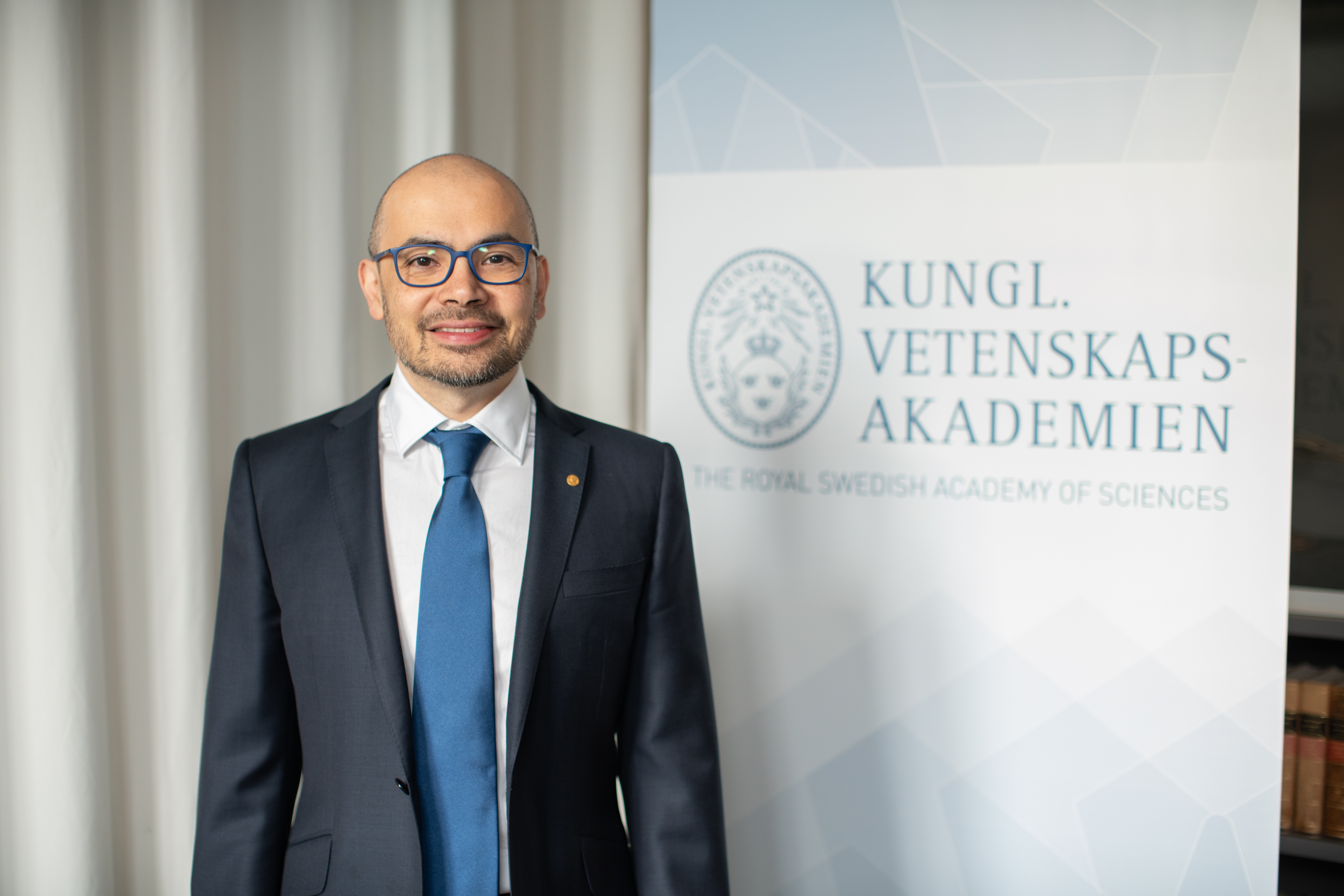
Hassabis at 2024 Nobel Week

In November 2020, DeepMind again announced world-beating results in the CASP14 edition of the competition with AlphaFold 2, a new version of the system. It achieved a median global distance test (GDT) score of 87.0 across protein targets in the challenging free-modelling category, much higher than the same 2018 results with a median GDT < 60, and an overall error of less than the width of an atom (<1 Angstrom), making it competitive with experimental methods, and leading the organisers of CASP to declare the problem essentially solved. Over the next year DeepMind used AlphaFold2 to fold all 200 million proteins known to science, and made the system and these structures openly and freely available for anyone to use via the AlphaFold Protein Structure Database developed in collaboration with EMBL-EBI.

== Personal life ==
Hassabis and his family live in North London. He is a lifelong fan of Liverpool FC. Hassabis' father is a Greek Cypriot who grew up as an only child and was the first of his family to attend university but, according to Sebastian Mallaby, "he was too much of a bohemian free spirit to abide office work", as he was an aspiring singer-songwriter and made a living out of selling toys out of the back of a van. Hassabis' mother was a Chinese Singaporean, who grew up poor and an orphan. She was adopted by a relative and studied nursing, but worked as a retail clerk and part-time as a cleaner. Other than English, Hassabis understands some Greek as well and says he is proud and enthusiastic about his Greek origin, being a regular visitor to Greece and having "a lot of contact with the Greek side of things". He met and conversed with Greek Prime Minister Kyriakos Mitsotakis in 2025.

Hassabis is the main subject of the documentary The Thinking Game, which premiered at the 2024 Tribeca Festival, by the same filmmaker as the award-winning documentary AlphaGo (2017), which chronicles the famous 2016 $1M challenge match in Seoul, South Korea, between Lee Sedol and AlphaGo. In 2026, a book-length biography by Sebastian Mallaby was published, The Infinity Machine: Demis Hassabis, DeepMind and the Quest for Superintelligence.

== Awards and honours ==
Hassabis delivering his Nobel Lecture at Stockholm University, December 8, 2024.

- 2009 – Fellow of the Royal Society of Arts (FRSA)
- 2013 – Listed on Wired's 'Smart 50'
- 2014 – Third most influential Londoner according to the London Evening Standard
- 2014 – Mullard Award of the Royal Society
- 2015 – Financial Times top 50 Entrepreneurs in Europe
- 2015 – Fellow Benefactor, Queens' College, Cambridge
- 2016 – Honorary Fellow, University College London
- 2016 – Francis Crick Institute scientific advisory board
- 2016 – London Evening Standard list of influential Londoners, number 6
- 2016 – Royal Academy of Engineering Silver Medal
- 2016 – Wired Leadership in Innovation
- 2016 – Nature's 10: the 10 most influential (good or bad) scientists of the year
- 2016 – Financial Times Digital Entrepreneur of the Year
- 2016 – Wired Global 100
- 2017 – Appointed Commander of the Order of the British Empire (CBE) in the 2018 New Year Honours for "services to Science and Technology".
- 2017 – Time 100: The 100 Most Influential People
- 2017 – The Asian Awards: Outstanding Achievement in Science and Technology
- 2017 – Elected a Fellow of the Royal Academy of Engineering (FREng)
- 2017 – American Academy of Achievement: Golden Plate Award
- 2018 – Elected a Fellow of the Royal Society (FRS) in May
- 2018 – Adviser to the UK's Government Office for Artificial Intelligence
- 2018 – Honorary doctorate, Imperial College London
- 2019 – Winner of UKtech50 (the 50 most influential people in UK technology) from Computer Weekly
- 2020 – Pius XI Medal from the Pontifical Academy of Sciences
- 2020 – The 50 most influential people in Britain from British GQ magazine
- 2020 – Dan David Prize – Future Award
- 2021 – Royal Designer for Industry
- 2021 – IRI Medal, established by the Industrial Research Institute (IRI)
- 2021 – International Honorary Member of the American Academy of Arts and Sciences
- 2022 – VinFuture Prize for Innovators with Outstanding Achievements in Emerging Fields
- 2022 – Global Swiss AI Award
- 2022 – BBVA Foundation Frontiers of Knowledge Award in the category "Biology and Biomedicine"
- 2022 – Princess of Asturias Award (with Yoshua Bengio, Geoffrey Hinton, and Yann LeCun) for Technical and Scientific Research
- 2022 – Wiley Prize in Biomedical Sciences
- 2022 – Advisor to the Advanced Research and Invention Agency
- 2023 – BCS Lovelace Medal
- 2023 – UCL Prize Lecture in Life and Medical Sciences
- 2023 – Albert Lasker Award for Basic Medical Research
- 2023 – Honorary degree, École Polytechnique Fédérale de Lausanne
- 2023 – Included in the Time 100 AI list
- 2023 – Member of the Academia Europaea
- 2023 – Canada Gairdner International Award
- 2023 – Ordinary Member of Pontifical Academy of Sciences
- 2023 – Breakthrough Prize in Life Sciences for developing AlphaFold, which accurately predicts protein structures
- 2024 – Nobel Prize in Chemistry
- 2024 – Clarivate Citation Laureates
- 2024 – Keio Medical Science Prize
- 2024 – The AI Citizen of the Year
- 2024 – Included in the Time 100 AI list
- 2024 – Science Museum Group Fellowship Awards
- 2024 – Honorary degree, University of Oxford
- 2024 – Knight Bachelor for "services to artificial intelligence"
- 2025 – Winner of UKtech50 (the 50 most influential people in UK technology) from Computer Weekly
- 2025 – Gold House A100 Honoree
- 2025 – Time 100: The 100 Most Influential People
- 2025 – STAT Status List
- 2025 – Ukie Hall of Fame
- 2025 – Included in Time's Person of the Year issue
- 2026 – International member of the National Academy of Engineering
- 2026 – Albert Medal (Royal Society of Arts)

=== Breakthroughs of the Year ===
Hassabis's research work has been listed in the Top 10 Scientific Breakthroughs of the Year by the journal Science on four separate occasions:

- 2007 Breakthrough of the Year (Top 10) – for neuroscience research on imagination
- 2016 Breakthrough of the Year (Top 10) – for AlphaGo
- 2020 Breakthrough of the Year (Top 10) – for AlphaFold v1
- 2021 Breakthrough of the Year (Winner) – for AlphaFold v2

=== DeepMind ===
- Cambridge Computer Laboratory Company of the Year (2014)
- Nine Nature front cover articles (2015, 2016, 2019, 2020, two in 2021, 2022, 2024, and 2026) and one Science front cover article (2017)
- Honorary 9-dan Go rank for AlphaGo from Korea Baduk Association (2016), Chinese Weiqi Association (2017), and Japan Go Association (2024)
- Cannes Lion Grand Prix for the documentary AlphaGo (2016)
- Wired Innovation in AI Award (2016)
- City A.M. Innovative Company of the Year (2016)
- Time 100 most influential companies of 2025

=== Games ===
Hassabis is a five-time winner of the all-round world board games championship (the Pentamind), and an expert player of many games including:

- Chess: achieved Master standard at age 13 with an Elo rating of 2300
- Diplomacy: World Team Champion in 2004, 4th in 2006 World Championship
- Poker: cashed at the World Series of Poker six times including in the Main Event
- Multi-games events at the London Mind Sports Olympiad: World Pentamind Champion (five times: 1998, 1999, 2000, 2001, 2003) and World Decamentathlon Champion (twice: 2003, 2004)
- Go: 7th amateur dan from Korea Baduk Association in honor of 10th anniversary of AlphaGo versus Lee Sedol match.
