= Deathwing =

Deathwing may refer to:

== Literature ==
- Deathwing (comics), an alternate-future incarnation of Dick Grayson/Nightwing in DC Comics
- The Deathwing, a fictional organisation in Douglas Hill's Last Legionary novel series

== Games ==
- Deathwing (board game), a 1990 expansion of the Space Hulk board game
- Space Hulk: Deathwing, a 2016 video game
- Deathwing, antagonist in World of Warcraft: Cataclysm
- Deathwing, a 2019 patch of Heroes of the Storm
