= Republic: The Revolution =

2003 video game

- Developer: Elixir Studios (Note: Ported to Mac OS X by Feral Interactive.)
- Publishers: Eidos Interactive (Windows); Feral Interactive (Mac OS X)
- Director: Demis Hassabis
- Producer: Adrian Bolton
- Designer: Demis Hassabis
- Artist: Wayne Kresil
- Composer: James Hannigan
- Engine: Totality Engine
- Platforms: Windows, Mac OS X
- Release: Windows: NA: August 26, 2003; EU: August 29, 2003; AU: September 11, 2003; Mac OS X: NA: July 30, 2004; EU: 2004
- Genre: Strategy
- Mode: Single player

Republic: The Revolution is a video game produced by Elixir Studios and published by Eidos Interactive and for Mac OS X by Feral Interactive. The game is a political simulation in which the player leads a political faction to overthrow the government of a fictional totalitarian country in Eastern Europe, using diplomacy, subterfuge, and violence. Development of Republic was led by Elixir Studios, a company by founder Demis Hassabis, who had previously worked on simulation games for Bullfrog Productions and Lionhead Studios. Design of the game was ambitious, with the game experiencing media hype from Demis Hassabis' descriptions of the game as a highly detailed and realistic simulation of political dynamics. The game experienced several delays, leading to the restriction of the scope of the game's features and scale.

Republic was released on 27 August 2003 to mixed reception, with many critics observing that the game fell short of the expectations induced by its lead developer. Whilst the originality and detail of the game was praised, many reviews observed the game lacked depth. The underperformance of Republic lead to Elixir Studios' discontinuation of development of additional features for the game, and a planned multiplayer sequel, Republic Dawn, was discontinued.

== Gameplay ==
The player in Republic leads a grassroots political faction seeking to place their preferred government in power. As a strategy game, the 3D game engine is mostly a facade on top of simpler rules and mechanics reminiscent of a boardgame. The 3D engine provides a high level of detail and helps 'flesh out' the world of Novistrana, enabling players to take a virtual tour of their current location. However, the overall influence of the 3D engine on the actual mechanics of gameplay is minimal - the ability to view actions taking place does not affect the outcome of those actions. Some actions carried out in the game offer extra customization options in the 3D view (for instance, choosing the approach for canvassing or allocating 'cards' in negotiations) but these are separate to the 3D world.

Ideology is the main way in which the political dynamics in Novistrana are simulated in Republic. The player, characters, actions, and districts in the game possess an ideology score as a total sum of three measures: Force, Influence, and Wealth. This score represents alignment towards certain actions on the political spectrum. Ideology influences many aspects of gameplay, including player's chances of success or failure in interacting with other characters, and their ability to take over and maintain a district.

The game is divided into Days, each of which is a cycle of a Morning, Afternoon, and Night. Each of these periods is a turn of sorts, in which orders may be given to faction members to be carried out in the next available turn. Every morning force, influence, and wealth, the in-game resources, are collected.

== Synopsis ==
=== Setting ===
A press kit screenshot of Republic depicting an aerial view of the game's setting, Novistrana.

The game is set in Novistrana, a fictional former state of the Soviet Union. The design of Novistrana was inspired by real-world states such as Belarus, Ukraine, and Azerbaijan. Game characters speak a fictional language reminiscent of Ukrainian or Russian. The population is largely Slavic, and the country's churches are Eastern Orthodox. Novistrana is rife with political turmoil, with many differing political forces vying for power representing a range of ideologies. The ideologies of Novistranans are generally influenced by their class or career. Police brutality and political corruption are prevalent. Novistrana has its own national anthem, which is sung in a fictional language. Similarly, the alphabet used in Novistrana is fictional although it draws heavily from the Cyrillic alphabet. "Novistrana" can be translated in Russian and some Eastern European/Slavic languages as "New Country". In other Slavic languages it could be translated as "New Party".

=== Plot ===
Republic depicts the rise to political power of the player in the country of Novistrana. Following the collapse of communism across the Soviet Union, Novistrana has deteriorated into a totalitarian regime run by Vasily Karasov. Elected President-for-life, Karasov has overseen enormous inequality in Novistrana, whilst orchestrating crackdowns on dissidents, siphoning state funds into his own accounts, and conducting clandestine arrests with the Secret Police. The player is a young man in Novistrana who is compelled to take political action after witnessing the arrest of his parents by the Secret Police. The player has been monitoring the rise of Karasov over the previous decades, waiting for a chance to exact revenge. The game's ultimate goal is to build a faction to topple Novistrana's government and liberate the country from Karasov's rule.

== Development ==
=== Production ===
Republic was the initial project of Elixir Studios, a company established by London based founder Demis Hassabis. Hassabis had closely collaborated with Peter Molyneux on the 1994 simulation game Theme Park with Bullfrog Productions. In 1998, Hassabis left the successor company Lionhead Studios to pursue his aspirations to establish his own studio. The Republic development team initially consisted of 15 Elixir Studios staff, growing to a team of 35 by 2003. Hassabis acquired several staff for Elixir Studios from colleagues and graduates at Cambridge University, and had avoided poaching staff from his connections from Lionhead Studios due to having left on good terms with the studio. The studio immediately began work on Republic, inspired by a range of sources, including the board games Junta, Illuminati, and Diplomacy, and the Elias Canetti book Crowds and Power.

Starting in 1998, Republic had a troubled production, with the game experiencing considerable delays over its initial release schedule for Spring 2002. Demis Hassabis attributed these delays at the time to an underestimation of the time needed to implement features at scale and detail desired for the game. However, alternative explanations have included the decision to hire Cambridge University graduates inexperienced with games development to undertake lead and manager positions within Elixir Studios. Further issues in the development process resulted from the close involvement of founder Demis Hassabis in all stages of production. In acting as lead designer, CEO and producer, Hassabis curated the game's vision in a way that led to direct decision-making over critical design aspects of the game. Hassabis ultimately decided to step down from his role as CEO of Elixir Studios during production in May 2003, to focus on involvement in the development process.

Delays to Republic led the Elixir Studios development team to restrict the ambitious scope of the game. Revisions to the scope included the number of locations, with the concept of "hundreds of cities and towns" to a district-based system within a single city. Furthermore, the level of detail advertised early in the game, citing "thousands of factions, organizations and parties to subvert and control, each with their own goals and powers" was profoundly simplified to a total of ten distinctive factions. Following major delays, Republic reached its beta testing stage in July 2003, with final mastering of the game completed on August 8, 2003, and the game was launched by Eidos Interactive in North America on August 26, Europe on August 29, and Australia on September 11. Feral Interactive released a port for Mac OS X the following year on July 30, 2004.

=== Marketing ===
A screenshot of Republic illustrating the level of detail at the street level using the Totality Engine.

Republic experienced significant media hype arising from how its political simulation mechanics and level of graphical detail were marketed to the press, and significant coverage of the game at events such as E3. Many outlets were impressed by the scope of previews of the game, and shared predictions that the game would be "the most ambitious game ever", "a landmark moment in strategy gaming", and "a gaming milestone and stunning paradigm shift in games technology". Initial previews of Republic in 2000 focused upon the purported level of detail behind the game's engine, the "Totality Engine". Described as "the most advanced graphics engine ever seen, (with) no upper bound of on the number of polygons and objects", it was claimed the game could "render scenes with an unlimited number of polygons in real time". Tech demonstrations of Republic at this time showcased a high polygonal level of detail, with the claim that players would be able to zoom smoothly from the buildings in Novistrana to assets such as flowers upon the balconies of buildings with no loss of detail. The game was further purported to have artificial intelligence that would simulate "approximately one million individual citizens" at a high level of detail, each with "their own unique and specific AI" comprising "their own daily routine, emotions, beliefs and loyalties".

Republic was showcased to press at several major events, including the Game Developers Conference in March 2001, and E3 in May 2001 to 2003, Industry impressions were broadly positive of Republic, with the game winning several accolades from publishers, including GameSpy awarding the game the "Best of Show" at E3 2001 for its "fresh new concept and great graphics engine", and IGN awarding it with the most "Innovative Design" of E3 2002.

However, by 2003, delays in the release of the game and the ambitious tone of the marketing had soured the enthusiastic tone of the gaming press. Interviews with Demis Hassabis at this time began to highlight shared concerns that the game may be too detailed or cerebral to attract an audience, that delays to the game indicated scope creep with the project, and that the high expectations for the game may be unrealistic and not met upon release.

=== Soundtrack ===
The music for Republic was composed by James Hannigan, and used an innovative adaptive music system. This process involved programming software to re-order and layer recordings from an orchestra into a seamless background music track. The music was designed to play certain elements in accord with events that occurred in the game, such as the transitions from day and night, the occurrence of in-game events, and the success or failure of player actions. James Hannigan reflected that "a lot of music tends in games tends to be disconnected from what is going on...the aim of the game is rise to power and I wanted the music to play a narrative role in that." Hannigan was nominated for a BAFTA Games award for Original Music in 2004 for his work on Republic.

== Reception ==
=== Reviews ===
Republic: The Revolution

Aggregate score
Aggregator	Score
Metacritic	62/100 (PC; based on 21 reviews)

Review scores
Publication	Score
Computer Gaming World	2.5/5
Eurogamer	6/10
Game Informer	6/10
GameSpot	6.9
GameSpy	68%
IGN	7.2
PC Gamer (US)	50%
PC PowerPlay	64%
PC Zone	8.8

Critical reception of Republic was mixed, with review aggregator Metacritic indicating the game received "mixed or average" reviews, with an average score of 62 out of 100 based on 21 reviews.

Many reviewers expressed disappointment that Republic fell short of their expectations. Anthony Fordham of PC PowerPlay described the game as a "colossal disappointment", citing the "hype about its living city...a massively detailed game world where you could zoom in to unprecedented levels of intimate detail." Stephen Poole of PC Gamer similarly observed "it's almost never a good sign when a game spends four years in development and ships two years after its original release date, and Republic doesn't buck the odds."

Many reviews of Republic praised the game's originality in spite of its acknowledged shortcomings. PC Zone praised the game as a game that "(dares) to be unique", with "levels of depth and subtle complexity that have not been seen in computer games before". Sam Parker of GameSpot found "the core game...can be at times fascinating in its free-form simulation of grassroots politics. In a negative review, Anthony Fordham of PC PowerPlay conceded "you will eventually discover a deep and detailed game buried somewhere under Republic's layers of obscurity", suggesting that it may find appeal as a "cult hit".

Reviews of Republic were mixed in their assessment of whether the game reflected a convincing political simulation. PC Zone stated the game is "simulating real-world social, class and moral dynamics closer than anything seen before". Stephen Poole of PC Gamer stated the "ideological relationships" underpinning the politics of Republic "have all the depth of rock, paper scissors...it's not very gratifying for anyone expecting a realistic representation of realpolitik in action." Reviewers were also mixed on the representation and detail of the setting, Novistrana, due to its poor relationship to the gameplay. Sam Parker of GameSpot noted ironically that despite the "lofty technical ambitions and sustained development delays...the huge world that took so long to construct ends up as the least involving part of the game." Similarly, Bruce Geryk of Computer Gaming World observed "the attempt to create an immersive game world utterly fails...the vast environment turns out to be singularly uninspiring and completely useless", due to all actions in the game being planned in the two-dimensional menu of the game.

Many critics expressed frustration with the poor ability of the interface to reflect the mechanics of the game. Rob Fahey of Eurogamer stated the game "lacked the "interface...suited to handling masses of statistics and information in a competent way." Anthony Fordham of PC PowerPlay found "the methodology of managing that information tedious. The interface is woeful. The game fails to communicate with the player effectively." Similarly, Allen Rausch of GameSpy stated the interface was "one of the most diabolically obscure I've ever seen in a video game...the (map) does a remarkably poor job of transmitting what's going on." Negative reviews of Republic also focused on the slow pace and passive turn-based approach to the gameplay. Reviewers Adam Biessner and Andy McNamara of Game Informer felt the game was "really pretty tedious for little to no pay off, especially since it starts off at an insanely slow place...it's turn-based at heart (and) nothing happens except in time blocks." Allen Rausch of GameSpy noted "you'll often be waiting for an event to occur...while time can be sped up, there's far too much dead time waiting for the clock to move."

== Legacy ==
Following the release of Republic, many evaluated the game to have been a disappointment, with journalists remarking it was "widely considered to be a letdown following its lengthy development cycle and ambitious design", and was an "unusual and expensive misfire". Elixir Studios abandoned additional features planned for Republic following poor reception of the game, including the testing of a multiplayer mode for potential inclusion.

=== Republic Dawn ===
Elixir Studios undertook initial development on a sequel to Republic, titled Republic Dawn: The Chronicles of the Seven. The sequel was announced by the studio on February 22, 2005, and was planned for release in 2007. The game was announced as a partnership with Nicely Crafted Entertainment, who had created the online strategy game Time of Defiance.

Republic Dawn was envisaged as a first-person massively multiplayer online game featured in space in which players must build a republic. The game's online capabilities were touted to support "hundreds of thousands of people (who) will be able to take part in building a republic." The game would feature player versus player mechanics allowing for combat and competitive business, allowing players to create political movements and influence the running of the republic and its actions. The game's story was also developed independent of Republic, with both studios collaborating as a result of uniting "separate long term visions", with both companies reportedly contributing to the game's creative development towards developing a prototype.

Elixir Studios shut down in April 2005, leading to the discontinuation of the development of Republic Dawn. Whilst Elixir Studios CEO Mark Hewitt initially represented that the studio's closure would "have no bearing on Republic Dawn" and technical advice and ongoing support would continue to be provided to Nicely Crafted Entertainment, the project was ultimately abandoned and Republic Dawn was never released.
