= The Thinking Game =

- Directed by: Greg Kohs
- Produced by: Gary Krieg; Greg Kohs
- Cinematography: Greg Kohs
- Edited by: Steven Sander
- Music by: Dan Deacon
- Production companies: Across the Pond Productions; Reel As Dirt; Cityspeak Films
- Distributed by: Google DeepMind; YouTube
- Release dates: June 7, 2024 (Tribeca); March 21, 2025 (United Kingdom); November 26, 2025 (global)
- Running time: 83 minutes
- Country: United States
- Language: English

The Thinking Game is a 2024 documentary film directed by Greg Kohs. It follows Demis Hassabis and the Google DeepMind team as they solve the "grand challenge" of biology—the protein folding problem—using the AI system AlphaFold, while pursuing the broader goal of artificial general intelligence (AGI).

The film documents the scientific work that ultimately led to Hassabis and John Jumper being awarded the Nobel Prize in Chemistry in 2024. Following a limited theatrical run, the film was released for free on YouTube in late 2025, where it became a viral phenomenon, amassing over 200 million views in four weeks.

== Premise ==
Filmed over five years, The Thinking Game chronicles the work of Demis Hassabis at Google DeepMind's headquarters in London.

The documentary focuses on the development of AlphaFold, an AI system designed to predict the 3D structure of proteins. This culminates in DeepMind's participation in the 14th Critical Assessment of Protein Structure Prediction (CASP14) in 2020, where the system successfully solved a 50-year-old biological problem. This achievement is framed as part of a broader effort to develop artificial general intelligence capable of accelerating scientific discovery.

== Release ==
The Thinking Game had its world premiere at the Tribeca Festival in New York City on June 7, 2024. It was subsequently screened at the Vancouver International Film Festival and the Tallinn Black Nights Film Festival.

The film received a limited theatrical release in the United Kingdom beginning March 21, 2025. It was released globally via YouTube on November 26, 2025. By late December 2025, the documentary had surpassed 200 million views on the platform.

== Reception ==
=== Critical response ===
Early critical response to The Thinking Game was positive, with praise directed at its accessibility and the scope of its scientific subject matter. Writing for The Guardian, Leslie Felperin described the film as a "competent, fluent documentary" that offers an "approachable entry" into the subject of AGI, though noting it occasionally carried the flavor of a "corporate video."

The Wall Street Journal highlighted the film's success on YouTube, noting its appeal to a broad audience beyond the tech sector.

=== Accolades ===
Year	Nominee / work	Award	Result
2024	Tribeca Festival	Official Selection: Spotlight Documentary	Nominated
2024	Vancouver International Film Festival	Official Selection	Nominated
2024	Tallinn Black Nights Film Festival	Official Selection	Nominated

== See also ==
- AlphaGo (film)
- The Imitation Game
