= Elixir Studios =

Defunct British video game developer

- Type: Video game developer
- Industry: Video games
- Founded: 1998
- Defunct: 2005
- Fate: Closed
- Headquarters: London, England, United Kingdom
- Key people: Demis Hassabis; David Silver
- Products: Republic: The Revolution; Evil Genius

Elixir Studios was a British video game development company based in London, England. It was founded in 1998 by Demis Hassabis, a former developer at Lionhead Studios, with the goal of creating innovative and original intellectual properties in the video game space. The company sought to differentiate itself from industry trends by avoiding licensed content and focusing on strategic, simulation-based experiences. Elixir gained recognition for its unique titles such as Republic: The Revolution and Evil Genius. Despite early promise and a publishing deal with Eidos Interactive, the studio closed in 2005 due to the cancellation of a major project and difficulties in securing continued support in what it described as an increasingly risk-averse industry. The rights to Elixir's intellectual properties were later acquired by Rebellion Developments.

== History ==
The company was founded on 7 July 1998 by Demis Hassabis, formerly a prominent figure at Lionhead Studios. After failing to secure venture capital at acceptable terms, Hassabis had pitched his startup to 15 different publishers at E3 1998 in Atlanta, eventually signing a three-game deal with Eidos Interactive. At its height, Elixir had employed around sixty people and was based in London. It aimed to be an independent developer, creating its own intellectual properties rather than licensing established ones. The studio promoted a research-led approach to game design, with a particular focus on artificial intelligence and emergent gameplay systems.

The company’s first game, Republic: The Revolution, was released in 2003, following a lengthy development cycle of over five years. The game attempted to simulate a functioning society with thousands of individual citizens and complex AI systems. Though it received mixed reviews due to performance issues and steep learning curves, it was noted for its ambitious scope.

A second game, Evil Genius, was released in 2004. In contrast to the political seriousness of its predecessor, Evil Genius adopted a humorous tone and presented players with the opportunity to become an over-the-top villain in a stylized 1960s spy-fi world. The game was generally well-received for its innovative concept, art direction, and base-building mechanics, and it developed a cult following over time.

In 2005, however, the company announced that it would be closing. This followed the cancellation of development on a major project due to its "perceived high-risk", which had been underway for two years. The company, citing "the current risk averse publishing climate", concluded that its goal of exploring new territory was not possible. In a press release, Hassabis said: "It seems that today's games industry no longer has room for small independent developers wanting to work on innovative and original ideas. [...] This was the sole purpose of setting up Elixir and something we could never compromise on." Elixir stated that it had sufficient resources to pay redundancy packages to its staff and ensure that the company was wound down in an orderly manner.

Following the closure, Rebellion Developments bought Elixir's intellectual property in March 2006, including Evil Genius.

After Elixir's closure, Hassabis went on to co-found DeepMind Technologies in 2010, an artificial intelligence company acquired by Google in 2014. He later attributed many of the lessons in running a high-risk, innovation-driven team to his experience at Elixir Studios.

== Games ==
Elixir Studios developed two major titles during its operation, both falling within the strategy genre. The studio also worked on several additional projects that were ultimately cancelled.

=== Releases ===
Release date	Title	Genre	Platform(s)
2003	Republic: The Revolution	Strategy	Microsoft Windows, Mac OS X
2004	Evil Genius	Strategy	Microsoft Windows

==== Republic: The Revolution (2003) ====
Republic: The Revolution is a political strategy game set in a fictional post-Soviet state named Novistrana. The player assumes the role of a revolutionary leader attempting to overthrow a corrupt government through influence, propaganda, and strategic action. The game was notable for its ambitious scope and complex AI systems, though it received mixed reviews due to performance issues and steep learning curves.

==== Evil Genius (2004) ====
Evil Genius is a real-time strategy and simulation game that puts players in control of a criminal mastermind building a secret lair. Inspired by classic spy fiction, the game allows players to construct elaborate bases, manage henchmen, and execute plots for world domination. It was well-received for its humour, unique theme, and visual style, gaining a cult following over time.

=== Cancelled projects ===
Title	Genre	Platform(s)
Blue Vault	Real-time strategy	Microsoft Windows
Republic Dawn: The Chronicles of the Seven	Persistent online strategy	Microsoft Windows
Republic: The Revolution 2	Strategy	Xbox
Evil Genius 2	Strategy	Microsoft Windows
Dreams	Social simulation	

==== Blue Vault ====
A real-time strategy game developed by Elixir Studios that was previewed in 2004. Little information is available about the gameplay, but it was expected to feature tactical combat and futuristic themes before its cancellation.

==== Republic Dawn: The Chronicles of the Seven ====
Intended as a massively multiplayer online strategy game set in the same universe as Republic: The Revolution. The project was ambitious, aiming to create a persistent online world where players could influence the fate of entire civilizations.

==== Republic: The Revolution 2 ====
A proposed sequel to Republic: The Revolution that was planned for the Xbox console. Development did not progress far before it was cancelled, likely due to the commercial performance of the original game.

==== Evil Genius 2 (cancelled version) ====
This version of Evil Genius 2 was initially planned by Elixir Studios following the success of the original. However, it was cancelled when the studio shut down in 2005. The rights to the franchise were later acquired by Rebellion Developments, who released a new version of Evil Genius 2 in 2021.

==== Dreams ====
A competitor to The Sims was in development at Elixir Studios for Microsoft, described as being "about making relationships with the characters." It was ultimately cancelled as Microsoft did not believe they could compete with The Sims 2.

=== Game Descriptions ===
Republic: The Revolution (2003) A political strategy game set in a fictional post-Soviet state named Novistrana. Players assume the role of a revolutionary leader attempting to overthrow a corrupt government through influence, propaganda, and strategic action. The game was notable for its ambitious scope and complex AI systems.

Evil Genius (2004) A real-time strategy and simulation game that puts players in control of a criminal mastermind building a secret lair. Inspired by classic spy fiction, the game allows players to construct elaborate bases, manage henchmen, and execute plots for world domination.

Blue Vault A real-time strategy game developed by Elixir Studios that was previewed in 2004. Little information is available about the gameplay, but it was expected to feature tactical combat and futuristic themes before its cancellation.

Republic Dawn: The Chronicles of the Seven Intended as a massively multiplayer online strategy game set in the same universe as Republic: The Revolution. The project was ambitious, aiming to create a persistent online world where players could influence the fate of entire civilizations.

Republic: The Revolution 2 A proposed sequel to Republic: The Revolution that was planned for the Xbox console. Development did not progress far before it was cancelled, likely due to the commercial performance of the original game.

Evil Genius 2 (cancelled version) This version of Evil Genius 2 was initially planned by Elixir Studios following the success of the original. However, it was cancelled when the studio shut down in 2005. The rights to the franchise were later acquired by Rebellion Developments, who released a new version of Evil Genius 2 in 2021.

== Legacy and impact ==
Despite its short lifespan, Elixir Studios left a significant impact on both the gaming and technology industries. The studio was widely regarded as ambitious and experimental, attempting to push the boundaries of artificial intelligence and simulation in games at a time when the technology was still evolving. Titles like Republic: The Revolution and Evil Genius were praised for their originality and complexity, even though they received mixed reviews upon release.

Over time, Evil Genius gained a cult following due to its unique blend of humor, strategic gameplay, and 1960s spy-fi aesthetic. This enduring popularity ultimately led to the development of a sequel, Evil Genius 2: World Domination, by Rebellion Developments in 2021 — nearly two decades after the original game's release. The sequel maintained many of the core elements that made the original beloved, serving as a testament to Elixir's creative legacy.

The studio's founder, Demis Hassabis, went on to co-found DeepMind Technologies, a leading artificial intelligence research company. He has frequently cited his experiences at Elixir Studios—especially around managing complex systems and working with cutting-edge technology—as formative in shaping his path to AI research. DeepMind has since become known for its development of advanced AI models such as AlphaGo, and was acquired by Google in 2014.

Through both its games and the broader technological contributions of its founder, Elixir Studios is often cited as an example of the intersection between creative vision and technological innovation.

== Development philosophy ==
Elixir Studios distinguished itself in the early 2000s by embracing a development philosophy centered on innovation, artificial intelligence, and emergent gameplay systems. The studio aimed to develop deeply immersive and dynamic gaming experiences by simulating real-world systems and behaviors, rather than relying on scripted or linear mechanics.

In Republic: The Revolution, the team attempted to simulate a functioning city populated by thousands of citizens with individual routines, beliefs, and relationships. Although the final release scaled back some of these features due to technical limitations, the design ambition was clear—aiming to offer players a sandbox of political strategy in an open-ended world.

Evil Genius followed a different but equally ambitious path, combining strategy, base-building, and humor with AI-controlled minions who responded to in-game situations in emergent ways. The game required players to plan for indirect outcomes, emphasizing systems-thinking over micromanagement.

According to Demis Hassabis, this systems-based approach stemmed from his academic interest in artificial intelligence and complex problem-solving. The studio often sought to blur the boundaries between simulation and narrative, striving to create games that felt alive, unpredictable, and player-driven.

This philosophy placed Elixir Studios ahead of its time but also contributed to the difficulties it faced in a commercially conservative publishing environment. Its commitment to original IPs, long development cycles, and high-risk ideas made it challenging to secure sustainable publisher support, ultimately leading to its closure.

Nevertheless, the studio's design approach has been retrospectively praised and seen as a precursor to more modern sandbox and simulation titles that emphasize emergent behavior and AI-driven interaction.
