= David Silver (computer scientist) =

Computer scientist and researcher

David Silver FRS
- Born: 1976 (age 49–50)
- Education: University of Cambridge (BA); University of Alberta (PhD)
- Known for: AlphaGo; AlphaZero; AlphaStar
- Awards: Royal Society University Research Fellowship (2011); ACM Prize in Computing (2019)
- Scientific career
- Fields: Artificial intelligence Machine learning Reinforcement learning Planning; Computer Games
- Workplaces: Google Deepmind; University College London; Elixir Studios
- Thesis: Reinforcement learning and simulation-based search in computer Go (2009)
- Doctoral advisor: Richard S. Sutton
- Website: www.davidsilver.uk

David Silver (born 1976) is an AI researcher and the CEO of the AI startup Ineffable Intelligence. He is also a professor at University College London.

From 2013 to 2026, Silver worked full-time at DeepMind, leading reinforcement learning research. He notably led the development of AlphaGo and AlphaZero.

== Education ==
He studied at Christ's College, Cambridge, graduating in 1997 with the Addison-Wesley award, and having befriended Demis Hassabis whilst at Cambridge. Silver returned to academia in 2004 at the University of Alberta to study for a PhD on reinforcement learning, where he co-introduced the algorithms used in the first master-level 9×9 Go programs and graduated in 2009. His version of program MoGo (co-authored with Sylvain Gelly) was one of the strongest Go programs as of 2009.

== Career and research ==
After graduating from university, Silver co-founded the video games company Elixir Studios, where he was CTO and lead programmer, receiving several awards for technology and innovation.

Silver was awarded a Royal Society University Research Fellowship in 2011, and subsequently became a lecturer at University College London. His lectures on reinforcement learning are available on YouTube.

=== Google DeepMind ===
Silver consulted for DeepMind from 2010, and joined in 2013 as a full-time employee.

His work focused on deep reinforcement learning, a field combining reinforcement learning with deep learning. Early work included a program that learns to play Atari games directly from pixels. Silver led the AlphaGo project, culminating in the first program to defeat a top professional player in the full-size game of Go. AlphaGo subsequently received an honorary 9-dan professional certification; and won the Cannes Lion award for innovation. He then led development of AlphaZero, which used the same AI to learn to play Go from scratch (learning only by playing itself and not from human games) before learning to play chess and shogi in the same way, to higher levels than any other computer program. His team also developed AlphaStar, an AI program that could play StarCraft II at a professional level.

Silver has over 300,000 citations and an h-index of 104 according to Google Scholar.

=== Ineffable Intelligence ===
Silver founded the AI startup Ineffable Intelligence in November 2025 and left Google DeepMind in January 2026 to become the director of Ineffable Intelligence. In February 2026, the startup was seeking a $1 billion seed funding round at a $4 billion valuation. In April 2026, it was announced that Silver had raised $1.1bn (£880m) for Ineffable Intelligence at a valuation of $5.1bn.

Silver pledged to donate 100% of his equity proceeds in Ineffable Intelligence, marking the largest commitment in the history of Founders Pledge.

== Awards and honours ==
Silver was awarded the 2019 ACM Prize in Computing for breakthrough advances in computer game-playing.

In 2021, Silver was elected Fellow of the Royal Society (FRS) for his contributions to Deep Q-Networks and AlphaGo. He was elected a Fellow of the Association for the Advancement of Artificial Intelligence in 2022.
