= Space Hulk (1993 video game) =

1993 video game

Space•Hulk
- Box cover art for Space Hulk
- Developer: Electronic Arts
- Publisher: Electronic Arts
- Designers: Nick Wilson; Kevin Shrapnell; Andy Jones
- Series: Warhammer 40,000
- Platforms: MS-DOS 3.3 or higher, Amiga, PC-98
- Release: June 1993 (MS-DOS); Autumn 1993 (Amiga)
- Genre: Real-time tactical first-person shooter
- Mode: Single-player

Space Hulk is a 1993 real-time tactical video game for MS-DOS, Amiga and PC-98. The game was based on Games Workshop's 1989 board game of the same name. Set in the fictional Warhammer 40,000 universe, the player directs squads of Space Marines, genetically enhanced armoured soldiers, in their missions to protect the human race from deadly aliens. Space Hulk was developed and published by Electronic Arts, with support from Games Workshop.

The game takes place aboard huge derelicts known as space hulks. Drifting in and out of the Warp—an alternate dimension used to cross interstellar distances—these vessels are infested with the four-armed Genestealers. Using overhead maps, the player orders the Marine squads, and controls individual Marines via first-person shooter interfaces. The game features a time-limited option to pause the action while enabling the player to continue issuing commands.

Space Hulk's theme of pitting slow and heavily armed Marines against fast, deadly Genestealers produced moments of frantic gameplay and a scary atmosphere for its reviewers, earning positive ratings for the game. A few reviewers, however, felt the game was too difficult and proved to be too frustrating. Space Hulk was followed up by Space Hulk: Vengeance of the Blood Angels in 1996.

== Gameplay ==
The game features 51 missions that involve exterminations, retrieval of objects, and rearguard actions. A campaign, comprising 21 of these missions played in sequence, centres around a story about a Space Marine investigation of a distress beacon in a region of space threatened by Genestealers. The remaining missions are tutorials designed to help players learn the game and standalone missions. Before a mission, the game briefs the player on the objectives and shows a small map of the operational area. Marines are usually equipped with a gun—the Storm Bolter—for long-range combat, and an energised glove—the Power Fist—for hand-to-hand fighting. For certain missions, the player can customise the squads' armaments, selecting from 10 other weapons, such as Heavy Flamers for destroying targets and the Chainfist for opening locked doors. In the campaign, Marines who survive a mission gain experience, improving their combat abilities and chances of survival for future missions.

On the Planning Screen, orders are issued to the Marines while they come under Genestealer attacks.

The player's Marines begin each mission grouped together at one or two starting points of the operational area, while Genestealers continually enter from marked entry points. Gameplay at this stage takes place between two separate interfaces: the Terminator View Screen, where the player takes direct control of individual Marines, and the Planning Screen, where orders are issued to the Marines by clicking on command icons. The Planning Screen has two maps; the smaller one on the bottom-left shows the operational area and the larger one displays a close-up view of the region selected by the player. Shown on the maps are the continuously updated positions of the Marines and their enemies. The game simulates fog of war by blacking out unexplored areas on the maps and representing unseen Genestealers as blips, unveiling them as Marines come within sight.

Switching to the Terminator View Screen offers a first-person perspective of the mission through the Marines' eyes. The Screen contains five monitors: a large primary monitor at the bottom and four smaller secondary displays arrayed above. The primary monitor displays the view of the Marine under the player's control. The character is moved by pressing the keyboard's cursor keys or clicking the directional arrows next to the monitor. The mouse is also used to aim and shoot at targets, although the computer determines if an accurate shot kills the target. The secondary monitors show the views of other squad members. Although the player cannot control the movements of these Marines through these interfaces, he or she can click them to shoot the Marines' weapons at the centre of their views. However, the player can take full control of a Marine by switching the character's view to the primary monitor.

At any time, Marines armed with Storm Bolters and not under the player's control assume "Overwatch" mode, automatically firing at obstacles and enemies that come into their paths. Storm Bolters have unlimited ammo, but may jam under sustained firing, rendering the weapon useless for a few seconds until the malfunction is cleared. In melee, the Power Fist is of limited effectiveness against a Genestealer's razor-sharp claws, while Marines armed with Lightning Claws or Thunder Hammer & Storm Shield are hand-to-hand specialists who forgo a ranged weapon.

Although the action unfolds in real-time, the player can pause the game by clicking the "Freeze" button and entering "Freeze Time". During this mode, all units stop moving while a timer runs down; the player can freely issue and modify orders to the Marines. Once the timer is depleted or the Freeze button is clicked again, every unit resumes its movement. The timer for Freeze Time slowly replenishes, as long as the game stays in real-time.

== Synopsis ==
=== Setting ===
Space Hulk is a video game based on a 1989 board game of the same name. Set in the fictional Warhammer 40,000 universe, the video game tasks the player to take control of genetically enhanced soldiers called Space Marines. As veterans of their Space Marine Chapter who earn the right to wear powered exoskeletons known as Terminator Armor, these Marines embark on missions aboard the eponymous derelict starships that drift in and out of the Warp, an alternate region of space where vast interstellar distances can be traversed in a short time. The vessels are infested with Genestealers, four-armed aliens, who invade worlds encountered in the ships' paths. Sworn to protect the human race, the Marines aim to eradicate the alien threat.

=== Plot ===
Overwhelmingly quick Genestealer attacks in narrow spaces led reviewers to proclaim this game as very difficult and frightening. Oft-remarked is the aliens' likeness to H. R. Giger's creations.

Space Hulk's campaign is mostly exposited through pre-mission briefings. The prologue in the manual says the Dark Angels, a force of Space Marines, had repelled a Genestealer incursion in the Tolevi system many centuries before current events in the game. A Dark Angel hero was leading his men aboard the invading space hulk, Sin of Damnation, when it vanished into the warp. The first mission in the campaign sends the player's squad to investigate the Tolevi system for a distress call of Dark Angels' origin. A nest of Genestealers is uncovered on the planet Ma'Caellia, and the player's forces are ordered to destroy the aliens' Hive Mind. However, there are too many Genestealers, and the Marines are forced to withdraw. Without any other options, the Marines destroy the infestation and all other life forms on the planet through exterminatus with virus bombs—biological weapons of mass destruction. As they are doing so, the Sin of Damnation re-enters the system, and the player receives orders to invade the hulk. Aboard the vessel, the player's squads destroy the Genestealers' gene banks and their Patriarch. The end of the campaign tasks the player to control a lone Marine as he goes deep into the hulk to find the source of the distress call.

== Development ==
The original Space Hulk board game was published by Games Workshop. It was the company's third board game that was adapted as a video game; the previous two board games were HeroQuest and Space Crusade, whose video game adaptations were both published by Gremlin Graphics. The board game version of Space Hulk is played between two players, who assume the roles of the Marines and Genestealers. The players take turns moving their pieces to accomplish their objectives; the Marines' player, however, is given a certain amount of time to finish each of their turns. The game is designed to encourage the two players to adopt different tactics in their play—the slow-moving Space Marines with long-range guns versus the fast-moving Genestealers who fight hand-to-hand.

Conversion of Space Hulk into a video game was initiated in 1991 by Electronic Arts, who also managed the project's development. Instead of following Gremlin's approach and creating exact copies of the board games in digital form, Electronic Arts and Games Workshop opted to develop a video game, based on Space Hulk, with features that took advantage of the personal computer's technological advancements. The interior walls of the space hulks were rendered by ray tracing, passing much of the graphical work to computers. This method reduced the time needed to introduce new sets of walls into the game from two weeks to twelve hours. Although digital speech was a relatively new technology at the time, the team made use of sound card technologies to produce alien screeches and roars that permeate the hulks, and warning cries from Marines under attack. The game's opening tune, "Get Out Of My Way", was recorded by British hard rock band D-Rok, with Brian May of Queen as guest guitarist. Games Workshop helped Electronic Arts keep the game true to its Warhammer 40,000 roots by providing the writers with materials and answers on the fictional universe. The development team created the tutorial missions, but adapted the other missions straight from the board game and the Deathwing Campaign expansion set.

Initially released in June 1993 on floppy disks for IBM PC compatibles, Space Hulk was later published for other platforms and media. The CD-ROM version of Space Hulk included nine new missions, new cinematic animations, and new digital sound effects and speech (which required a sound card). Unlike the versions that ran on DOS, the Amiga version (published in Autumn 1993) cannot be installed on a hard drive; Amiga users have to swap floppy disks at several points of the game while playing it. In Japan, the game was ported to the NEC PC-9821 by a local video game company, Starcraft. In 1996, Electronic Arts produced a sequel, Space Hulk: Vengeance of the Blood Angels, to Space Hulk.

== Reception ==
Reception

Review scores
Publication	Score
Computer Gaming World	3.5/5
Next Generation	3/5

Mission briefing from the game
The monastic briefings received polar reviews on their effects to the game's atmosphere; these vocals are produced over PC speakers.

Reviewers noted the atmosphere experienced while playing Space Hulk, describing it as similar to the science-fiction film Aliens (1986). Aside from the concept of pitting heavily armed soldiers against aliens that looked like H. R. Giger's "exo-skeletal nightmares", Space Hulk's Terminator View Screen was reminiscent of a sequence in the film where a marine lieutenant monitored and ordered his troops as they executed a mission in a dark, dank environment.

Handling slow, cumbersome Marines against fast, deadly Genestealers proved to be intense sessions of panic and fear for the game's critics. They were stressed from monitoring several Marines at the same time while Genestealers probed the flanks and sent decoys to lure Marines to their deaths. Despite playing in a well-lit, noisy office, David Upchurch of The One said the game "[scared] the pants off" him, and Jeff James of Computer Gaming World stated that because of the combination of "excellent use of digitized sound" and "Genestealers rendered in sickening purple hue", "More than once I jumped out of my command chair". A February 1994 survey of space war games in the magazine gave it a grade of B, stating that "graphics are superb and there is gore aplenty", but comparing non-controlled squad members to Star Trek redshirts. A May 1994 survey in the magazine of strategic space games set in the year 2000 and later gave the game three-plus stars out of five, stating that it was "as authentic as you'll find, with great graphics and sound". CU Amiga's Tony Dillon believed the game was not for those with "a weak heart", and Compute!'s Scott May declared the game "a bug blaster's nightmare come true." The game further evoked a sense of esprit de corps with its monastic-style briefings, according to Amiga User International. However, video game journalist Alec Meer remembered the briefings as "one of videogame history's greatest atmosphere-spoilers" for their flat deliveries.

Besides its atmosphere, Space Hulk's game mechanics received close attention. Lester Smith of Dragon said the video game was an excellent adaptation of its original tabletop form. He praised Electronic Arts for conveying the "bug-hunting experience on its own merits, using the computer's strength", rather than trying to imitate those aspects of the board game. Upchurch, along with Rik Skews of Computer and Video Games, agreed, pointing out that the electronic version was better off with the concept of Freeze Time than implementing a recreation of dice rolls and sequence of turns found in the board game. A few reviewers disagreed. Dee and Jay of Dragon wanted a "computer game that was faithful to the elements of the board game", and said the video game's design proved too difficult for them; they found controlling five or more Marines in real-time against Genestealers impossible. Similarly, Amiga Force's Mark Smith and Ian Osborne were flustered by having to command several Marines at the same time while they came under sudden attacks from several directions. The Marines' slow speed were another frustration. Offering another insight, Meer opined the Marines' slow response was integral to the game's atmosphere: made slow and cumbersome by the game's design and interface, the Marines' battles against fast and deadly foes became nerve-wrecking affairs for the player. Likewise, May found the multitasking nature of the game crucial to its intensity. Rob Mead offered an opinion not from a player of the board game in his article for Amiga Format. He rated the video game "very good, but not brilliant", and suggested it would appeal more to aficionados of the board game because such players tend to appreciate attention to detail, planning, and tactics.

Jim Trunzo reviewed Space Hulk in White Wolf #38 (1993), giving it a final evaluation of "Excellent" and stated that "even after playing the same scenario time after time (learning new tricks all the while), I kept going back for more. I was never bored and never upset. It's that much fun. Besides, once one has entered the Space Hulk, frankly, it becomes personal - the Genestealers have killed your brothers-in-arms and it's up to you to deliver the payback!"

Amiga reviewers had a common grouse: the frequent disk swaps required were tedious. Regardless, the game's tense atmosphere—generated by the combination of game mechanics, use of sounds, and artificial intelligence—provided memorable moments to many reviewers. As one of them—Simon Clays of Amiga Computing—put it, Space Hulk was "a very difficult strategy-cum-3D dungeon-esque title with plenty of action and gripping play." May said the game offered "demented" violence, but was "irresistibly exhiliarating when the action erupts in nonstop, heartpounding carnage." A decade after the game's release, several reviewers mentioned Space Hulk as a Warhammer 40,000 video game worthy of praise. Meer reflected on replaying the game fifteen years after its release, "The panic and terror of facing 90 degrees away from your enemy, and knowing that you can't do a damn thing about it before your lower intestine spills onto your feet, is still something pretty special."

Next Generation reviewed the PlayStation version of the game, and stated that "if you like a heavy dose of atmosphere and a little strategy mixed in with the action, Space Hulk delivers."

In 1994, PC Gamer UK named Space Hulk the 10th best computer game of all time. The editors considered it uniquely high-quality for a board game adaptation, and wrote that "the tension created as you struggle to keep your group alive against increasingly insurmountable odds is incredible."
