= Space Hulk =

Board game

- Manufacturers: Games Workshop
- Designers: Richard Halliwell, Dean Bass
- Publishers: Games Workshop
- Years active: 1989—present
- Players: 2

Space Hulk is a board game for two players produced by Games Workshop. It was originally released in 1989. The game is set in the fictional universe of Warhammer 40,000. In the game, a "space hulk" is a mass of ancient, derelict space ships, asteroids, and other assorted space debris. One player takes the role of Space Marine Terminators, superhuman elite soldiers who have been sent to investigate such a space hulk. The second player takes the role of Tyranid Genestealers, the vanguard of an aggressive alien species which have made their home aboard the derelict ship.

== Background ==
In Warhammer 40,000, the term "space hulk" is used to refer to any massive derelict space ship that drifts through the vacuum of the galaxy without apparent direction. Since the hulks often exit and re-enter the Warp seemingly at random, searching or travelling within them is dangerous in the extreme, however the Imperium often takes the risk of exploring these hulks for valuable millennia-old technology and artifacts. Space hulks may house more than just Genestealers; other threats aboard can include human followers of the dark gods of Chaos, nightmarish Warp Daemons, and Orks who use space hulks as their "standard" method of interstellar travel. The only realistic means of stopping such threats to the Imperium is to send boarding parties to clear out these infested hulks, as they are often so huge that they can easily shrug off all but the heaviest naval firepower while having their own atmosphere and gravity.

Genestealers were described in an entry of the "Aliens and monsters" section of the first edition of Warhammer 40,000 (the "WH40K - Rogue Trader" manual). However Genestealers were redesigned for Space Hulk, being influenced by the xenomorphs depicted in the Alien franchise. The expanded and rewritten game lore cast Genestealers as a sub-species and shock troops of the all-consuming Tyranids alien race, and of particular note is that Genestealers infiltrate/infect the local populace of target planets to cause civil unrest in advance of an invasion of their Tyranid Hive Fleet.

Space Marine Terminators are described in game lore as first company veterans in each Space Marine Chapter, having earned the right to don the sacred Terminator Armor, making them more powerful and resilient but slower than regular Marines, so Terminators are normally used in close quarter battle environments. Space Marine Terminators were originally only used in Space Hulk-type scenarios, but rules were added in White Dwarf magazine and subsequent releases of Warhammer 40,000 for the inclusion of Terminators as a small/elite part of a Marine army on the open battlefield.

Besides a space hulk, similar skirmishes between Space Marine Terminators and Genestealers can also be set in other environments.

== Gameplay ==
The game is set on a modular board made up of various board sections which represent corridors and rooms and which can be freely arranged and locked together like a jigsaw puzzle to represent the interior of a space hulk. One player controls the Space Marine Terminators, and the other player controls the Tyranid Genestealers.

It is an asymmetric game in the following respects:

- The two players have different forces.
- The players have different objectives to fulfil during a "mission" (the in-game term for a particular scenario). For example, the Terminator player may have the objective of destroying a specified area of the board or a specified Genestealer piece or some other objective; while the Genestealer player may have the objective of destroying a specified Terminator piece or all of the Terminator pieces or some other objective.
- The pieces of the two players move at different rates (Terminators move slowly, Genestealers rapidly).
- Terminator pieces excel at ranged combat, but are weak in close combat; the Genestealer pieces excel at close combat, but cannot perform ranged combat at all.

The pieces are moved by the players through a system of "action points", where each piece has a certain number specified for it. A Terminator piece has few action points; a Genestealer piece has many action points.

The game is notable for its hidden play mechanics, from which it derives much of its playability and tension.

On the one hand, the Terminator player has a variable number of "command points" available each turn which are only revealed to the Genestealer player after they are used up; these command points may be used to move the Terminator pieces either during the Terminator player's own turn or during the Genestealer player's turn. (In the second edition, the extra points were not hidden from the Genestealer player.) On the other hand, the actual number of Genestealer pieces in play is hidden from the Terminator player, because the Genestealer pieces come into play as "blips" which may represent multiple creatures. (1-3 creatures in the 1st, 3rd and 4th editions; 0-6 in the 2nd edition; 0-3 in the Deathwing expansion; and 1-6 in the Genestealer expansion.)

In the basic version of the game, playing as the Terminators can be engaging and tactically challenging, partly because the Terminator player is constrained by a time limit for their turn, while playing as the Genestealers can be very straightforward. To overcome this asymmetry, players are encouraged to play each mission of the game twice, swapping between playing with Terminators and playing with Genestealers. The fairly fast play time (around half an hour per mission), driven by the Terminator player's time limitation, makes this feasible.

The Deathwing expansion pack for the first edition included rules for playing the game as a one-player game—that is, playing the game as Terminators using different mechanics for moving the Genestealer pieces. There is also the addition of the Captain and Librarian, plus further Terminator weapons into the game, which greatly expanded the Terminator player's tactical capabilities. For instance, Terminators could be configured as melee specialists in lieu of carrying ranged weapons.

The Genestealer expansion pack for the first edition included rules for human-genestealer hybrids, which could carry weapons and equipment, and for a Magus and for a Patriarch, adding more depth for the Genestealer player. However, these additions were not carried over in the second or the third or the fourth editions, although the third and the fourth editions did include rules for a Broodlord.

== Editions ==
=== First edition ===
The first edition of Space Hulk was released in May 1989.

This edition was further expanded with additional scenarios and rules in articles in the magazines White Dwarf and Citadel Journal. The early articles from White Dwarf were collected and published as two separate expansion packs, and most of the later articles from White Dwarf were collected and published as a book:

- Deathwing, a box set, was released in 1990. It introduced the Deathwing Company (First Company) of the Dark Angels Space Marines Chapter, including the Captain and the Librarian and additional Terminator weapons into the game, which greatly expanded the tactical possibilities for the Terminator player. Among other things the expansion pack also featured rules for the Space Marine player to play the game solo, and it included additional board sections.
- Genestealer, a box set, was released in 1990. It introduced the Genestealer Cult including Human-Genestealer Hybrids and the Magus and the Patriarch into the game, which greatly expanded the tactical possibilities for the Genestealer player. Among other things, the expansion pack also featured rules for an elaborate system of psychic combat, and it included additional board sections.
- Space Hulk Campaigns, a hardback book, was released in 1991 and later reprinted as a paperback in 1993. It introduced rules for Imperial Space Marine Terminators against Chaos Space Marine Terminators, and rules for Space Marines in Power Armour, and it included additional board sections.

=== Second edition ===
Second edition rulebook cover

The second edition of Space Hulk was released in April 1996.

This edition featured revamped board artwork and miniatures. It featured two identical plastic five-man Terminator squads with standard weaponry and assorted Genestealers.

This edition significantly simplified the rules compared to those of the 1st edition, and it offered less opportunity for expansion, due to the specific dice used for the game. A critical change was made to the Command Point system, no longer allowing them to be used in the enemy turn, altering the strategic complexity of the game. The rules for the heavy flamer were also changed, and the difference between the standard weapons and the area effect flamer was reduced.

This edition was further expanded with additional scenarios and rules in articles in the magazines White Dwarf and Citadel Journal, such as "Defilement of Honour" which involves rules for air ducts, a new kind of board section which allows Genestealers to move off the main board and back onto it from one place to another place, and "Fangs of Fenris" which involves Wolf Guard Terminators of the Space Wolves Space Marines Chapter. However the articles from White Dwarf were never collected and published as any expansion pack.

=== Third edition ===
The third edition of Space Hulk was released in September 2009.

The mail order stocks sold out three days before release, and most Games Workshop retail outlets were sold out within a week of release. Games Workshop announced no plans to reprint this edition of the game as it was intended to be a limited release.

This edition featured new sculpts designed specifically for Space Hulk, instead of being shared with the sets for the tabletop game Warhammer 40,000. Advancements in sculpting and moulding have allowed Games Workshop's Alex Hedström to add a greater level of detail to the miniatures. Each of the twelve miniatures representing Terminators has a distinct appearance, such as Brother Omnio being shown consulting a scanner mounted in his Power Fist. The miniatures representing Genestealers were depicted in various poses, with one bursting up from the floor and another climbing down from the wall. The counters and the board sections of the game were made using new debossing techniques which applied shallow depressions into the cardboard. These board sections were additionally much thicker and heavier than those of previous editions. The Games Workshop studio and box art represents the Blood Angels Space Marine Chapter.

The rules were modernised to some extent, but were largely similar to those of the 1st edition. One critical rule change was that a Terminator jamming his gun on overwatch does not lose the overwatch status. Also, a new rule, allowing a Terminator to go on guard (essentially a close combat version of overwatch), was added.

A reissue of the third edition was released on September 20, 2014.

Although the Games Workshop website sold out of Space Hulk less than 24 hours after it was available for pre-order, most stores had a number of copies available to buy on release day. The game was largely a re-release of the third edition with a few rules tweaked. It featured additional board sections and missions, plus refreshed graphical presentation of the existing art assets.

Three expansion campaigns were released specifically for iPad. These campaigns chronicle other Space Marine chapters, and they include rules for additional Space Marine Terminator troopers and weapons.

- Space Hulk Mission Files: Dark Angels - Bringer of Sorrow
- Space Hulk Mission Files: Space Wolves - Return to Kalidus
- Space Hulk Mission Files: Ultramarines - Duty and Honour

== Spin-offs ==
Two types of spin-offs of the board game have been released - a video game and a card game.

=== Video games ===
Numerous video games based on the Space Hulk board game have been released.

Space Hulk, released in 1993, is a real-time tactical game for PC (MS-DOS) and Amiga, developed and published by Electronic Arts. Using overhead maps, the player orders the Marine squads, and controls individual Marines via first-person shooter interfaces. The game features a time-limited option to pause the action while enabling the player to continue issuing commands. The Space Marines featured in this game are the Deathwing (1st Company) from the Dark Angels Chapter.

A game titled Aspect Warriors was under development and planned to be published by Electronic Arts for the Sega Mega Drive but it was never released.

Space Hulk: Vengeance of the Blood Angels was released by Electronic Arts in 1995 and 1996, on PC, PlayStation, Sega Saturn, and 3DO. The sequel to the 1993 video game, Vengeance of the Blood Angels combines first-person shooter gameplay with real-time tactical elements.

In 2005, a mobile phone version called Warhammer: Space Hulk was released. This game replicated the board game's play mechanics and allowed play as either Space Marines or Genestealers.

In 2008, a small group of hobbyists released a PC conversion of the board game, along with assorted scenarios, for free over the Internet. However, within a month the game was removed from the developers' site. They noted that the web download traffic was creating problems, and that Games Workshop were threatening legal action due to THQ's current ownership of the Warhammer 40,000 video game license. According to the development team, their attempts to negotiate for the release of the game with THQ were refused, resulting in the game being rebranded under the name "Alien Assault". A fan-made game called NetHulk is currently available as freeware. It allows two players to compete head-to-head over an internet or LAN connection, or in a hotseat mode. The game's rules do not strictly adhere to the board game, but are a hybrid of the first and second editions. QSpacehulk is another fan-made freeware available which strictly follows the rules of the second edition.

Space Hulk is a video game for PC (Windows) and Mac and Linux by Copenhagen-based game developer Full Control ApS. It was released in August 2013. The game has received mixed reviews, holding a rating of 59 (out of 100, based on 4 reviews) on review aggregator Metacritic.

Space Hulk: Ascension is a video game for PC (Windows), Mac, Linux and PlayStation 4 by Full Control ApS. It was released in November 2014 for PC.

Space Hulk: Deathwing is a tactical first-person shooter developed by Streum On Studio released in 2016 for the PC and PlayStation 4. It expands the gameplay environment, beyond the narrow maze-like corridors of the original board game and earlier video games, to include massive space ship interiors such as a cathedral. The story is co-written by Gav Thorpe, a longtime Games Workshop author and games designer.

Space Hulk: Tactics, released in 2018, is a video game for PlayStation 4, Windows PC and Xbox One. It was developed by Cyanide Studio and published by Focus Home Interactive.

=== Card game ===
One official card game has been released.

Space Hulk: Death Angel — The Card Game is a card game using a special die for one to six players by Fantasy Flight Games. It was released in 2010.

Four expansion packs have been released:

- Death Angel: Mission Pack 1 Expansion
- Death Angel: Space Marine Pack 1 Expansion
- Death Angel: Tyranid Enemy Pack
- Death Angel: Deathwing Space Marine Pack

== Reception ==
In the August 1989 edition of Games International (Issue #8), Brian Walker admired the professional production quality of this game. However, he found the game lacked play balance, since the space marines nearly always lost badly. He concluded by giving the game a poor rating of only 2 out of 5, saying, "There are some great ideas buried deep in the bowels of Space Hulk, but at the moment ideas is all they are."

Two issues later, in the November 1989 edition of Games International (Issue 10), Space Hulk's rating was raised to 3 out of 5, with the comment "Upgraded one star since our original review [...] as subsequent scenarios proved to be more balanced."

In Issue 43 of Challenge, John Theisen commented, "There's something very different about this game. Maybe it's the ugly nature of the opponent, or maybe it's just the odds." Theisen liked the components and artwork, calling them "up to Games Workshop's usual high standard for quality and use of color." He found that "Space Hulk is easy to learn and (I would venture to guess) very difficult to master." Theisen concluded, "Space Hulk possesses too many tactical subtleties to evaluate and has the potential for too many new scenarios to design to permit any dust to accumulate on it for very long. [...] Despite its high price, I recommend Space Hulk — or, to quote an Australian friend of mine, 'This one's a ripper!'"

In the April 1991 edition of Dragon (Issue 168), Ken Rolston called the 1st edition of the game "excellent", commenting on the "Expensive and elegant components, lovely alien Genestealer and Space Marine models, simple systems, and exceptionally clear rules with lots of helpful diagrams." He also complimented the "fast pace of play and lots of action and mayhem."

In Issue 22 of Magia i Miecz, Artur Marciniak reviewed the Polish language version of the game, and although he found the translation almost as good as the original edition, he bemoaned some of the translation issues, saying, "Unfortunately, the translation of the rules of the game leaves a lot to be desired. Bizarre syntax, English terms left untranslated (including some quite important ones), it all worked to reduce my satisfaction with the Polish release of this game."

In the May 1996 edition of Arcane (Issue 6), Mark Donald questioned its replayability and rated the 2nd Edition of Space Hulk a 7 out of 10, saying, "It's a fun game, a doddle to play, but it'll probably fade away to nothing once the initial playing frenzy is spent and all the missions have been played through to completion."

Space Hulk was chosen for inclusion in the 2007 book Hobby Games: The 100 Best. Matt Forbeck commented, "Space Hulk taught me more about elegance in design than any other game. It's an icon of well-nested mechanics that build a system far greater than its parts. Better yet, every part of the game works to support not only each other but the game's underlying metaphor, giving a united play experience that's unmatched."

== Reviews ==
- Syfy

== Awards ==
- Space Hulk won the Origins Award for Best Fantasy or Science Fiction Boardgame of 1989.
- One of its first expansions, Genestealers, won the Origins Awards the following year for Best Fantasy or Science Fiction Boardgame of 1990.
- Space Hulk won the 2009 Origins Award for Best Board Game.

== See also ==
- Space Crusade, Advanced Space Crusade, and Tyranid Attack, which has the same setting but simpler game mechanics
