= Space Hulk: Ascension =

2014 video game

- Steam store art
- Developer: Full Control
- Publishers: WW: Full Control; NA: Hoplite Research (PS4); PAL: Funbox Media (PS4)
- Series: Warhammer 40,000
- Platforms: Windows, Linux, OS X, PlayStation 4, Xbox One
- Release: Windows, OS X, Linux; November 12, 2014; PlayStation 4: NA: October 4, 2016; EU: October 14, 2016; AU: November 3, 2016; Xbox One; April 20, 2018
- Genre: Turn-based tactics
- Mode: Single-player

Space Hulk: Ascension (also known as Space Hulk: Ascension Edition) is a turn-based tactics video game developed and published by Full Control. It is set in the fictional universe of Warhammer 40,000, and is specifically an adaptation of the board game Space Hulk by Games Workshop. It is a follow-up to Full Control's 2013 Space Hulk.

== Gameplay ==
Space Hulk: Ascension is a turn-based tactics game. The player controls a squad of Space Marine Terminators as they invade "space hulks", a type of spaceship, and battle with alien creatures called Tyranid Genestealers. Compared to its predecessor, Ascension plays less like a board game, with less randomness, an upgrade system based on experience points, and an added fog of war system.

== Release ==
Space Hulk: Ascension was developed by Full Control, a studio based in Copenhagen, Denmark. Ascension was announced on August 12, 2014, and released on November 12, 2014, for Windows, Linux, and OS X. Several downloadable content (DLC) packs were released for the game, including Salamanders and The Dark Angels expansions. The PlayStation 4 version was announced on January 13, 2016, and released on October 4, 2016. The Xbox One version was released on April 19, 2018.

Ascension was the final game from Full Control before the studio stopped making new games.

== Reception ==
Reception

Aggregate score
Aggregator	Score
Metacritic	(PC) 72/100 (PS4) 68/100 (XOne) 53/100

Review scores
Publication	Score
GameSpot	(PC) 7/10
GamesTM	(PC) 4/10
Hardcore Gamer	(PC) 4/5
MeriStation	(PC) 7.5/10
PC Games (DE)	(PC) 76%
PC PowerPlay	(PC) 7/10

The PC, PlayStation 4, and Xbox One versions received "mixed or average reviews" according to the review aggregation website Metacritic.

Brett Todd of GameSpot summarized: "Space Hulk: Ascension rises to the challenge by preserving the spirit and most of the mechanics of the original board game, while still expanding on the design to embrace its new home on the PC." Bradly Halestorm of Hardcore Gamer summarized: "Space Hulk: Ascension Edition is the more complete and refined version of 2013's title bearing the same namesake." Sascha Lohmüller of PC Games said: "The Ascension edition of Space Hulk is better than its predecessor in every regard. The tactical gameplay opens up a lot of opportunities and the Warhammer-atmosphere is well-made. Its presentation is still a bit barren though and we miss the hot-seat-multiplayer of the first Space Hulk." Adam Smith of Rock Paper Shotgun summarized: "There's a good game hidden in the grimdark corridors, and it's [sic] best qualities aren't just borrowings from Games Workshop, but Ascension has taken two steps forward and one step back. And, as in the game, the backwards step is twice as costly."
