= Space Hulk (2013 video game) =

- Developer: Full Control
- Publishers: Full Control; Funbox Media (PS Vita); Hoplite Research (Android)
- Series: Warhammer 40,000
- Engine: Unity
- Platforms: Microsoft Windows; OS X; iOS; Linux; PlayStation 3; PlayStation Vita; Wii U; Android; PlayStation 4
- Release: 15 August 2013: Windows, OS X 15 August 2013 iOS 5 December 2013 Linux 29 January 2014 PlayStation 3, PS Vita; NA: 1 September 2015; PAL: 23 October 2015 Wii U; NA: 14 January 2016; EU: 4 February 2016 Android 8 June 2016 PlayStation 4; NA: 31 August 2016; EU: 9 September 2016; AU: 15 November 2017
- Genre: Turn-based tactics
- Modes: Single-player, multiplayer

Space Hulk is a 2013 turn-based tactics video game developed by Danish studio Full Control. It is based on the tabletop game of the same name by Games Workshop. It features the Blood Angels Chapter of the Space Marines battling grotesque aliens known as Genestealers. A follow-up game, Space Hulk: Ascension, was released in 2014.

== Plot ==
The plot of this table-top game is that the player has a squad of 2 assaulters, 1 force commander, 1 flamer and a librarian. The goal is to get to the shuttle at the exit while genestealers and tyranids block the player's path. A narrator explains each mission before starting.

== Gameplay ==
The gameplay is based heavily on the 4th edition of the tabletop game. The game is turn based and uses dice rolls. At each turn there is a limited number of action points to direct your squad. Extra action points can be earned from a dice roll. The game allows for undoing the last made action. The multiplayer supports hotseat mode.

== Reception ==
Reception

Aggregate score
Aggregator	Score
Metacritic	(iOS) 63/100 (PC) 58/100 (Wii U) 53/100 (Vita) 51/100

Review scores
Publication	Score
Edge	(iOS) 5/10
Eurogamer	(PC) 6/10
GameSpot	(PC) 6/10
Gamezebo	(iOS) 4/5
IGN	(PC) 6.7/10
Nintendo Life	(Wii U) 6/10
PlayStation Official Magazine – UK	(Vita) 4/10
PC Gamer (UK)	(PC) 64%
Pocket Gamer	(Vita) 3/5 (iOS) 2.5/5
Retro Gamer	(PC) 62%
The Guardian	(PC) 3/5
USgamer	(PC) 3/5
The Huffington Post UK	(PC) 4/5

The iOS, PC, PlayStation Vita and Wii U versions received "mixed" reviews according to the review aggregation website Metacritic.

Eurogamer's Dan Whitehead viewed the PC version as an exercise in nostalgia, faithful to the design of the original board game without innovating in any way, "more awestruck tribute than actual adaptation." Rob Zacny of IGN said that the same PC version's main problem was that "its designers couldn't let it deviate from or build on the simple rules of a board game experience that lacks tactical depth." It was considered, nevertheless to be "a fine game, a pleasant diversion."
