= Space Hulk: Tactics =

2018 video game

- Developer: Cyanide
- Publisher: Focus Home Interactive
- Series: Warhammer 40,000
- Platforms: Microsoft Windows; PlayStation 4; Xbox One
- Release: 9 October 2018
- Genre: Turn-based tactics
- Modes: Single-player, multiplayer

Space Hulk: Tactics is a turn-based tactics video game developed by Cyanide and published by Focus Home Interactive. The game is set in the Warhammer 40,000 universe and is based upon the turn-based strategy tabletop miniatures board game Space Hulk. The game was released on 9 October 2018.

== Gameplay ==
Players can play as one of four chapters of Space Marines (Blood Angels, Dark Angels, Space Wolves and Ultramarines) or their opponents, grotesque aliens known as Genestealers who come in four different factions. The game has two single-player campaigns, one you play as Blood Angels, the other as the Genestealers, along with competitive PvP multiplayer and a skirmish mode. A map builder allows players to create their own maps and scenarios to share with others. It is a turn-based tactics game and has elements of deck-building games. For example, players can use cards to give bonuses to their characters or refresh action points.

== Reception ==
Space Hulk: Tactics received mixed reviews on Metacritic. Charlier Hall for Polygon praised the customisation options for players. Fraser Brown, writing for Rock Paper Shotgun criticised the games pace and UI which "punishes even tiny mistakes". IGN called it "a wonderfully challenging, asymmetrical tactics game in spite of its poor PC controls".
