= Deathwing (board game) =

1990 board game expansion set

Cover art by Chris Baker, 1990

Deathwing is an expansion set published by Games Workshop (GW) in 1990 for the board game Space Hulk.

== Description ==
In the 1989 two-player board game Space Hulk, one player takes the role of Space Marine Terminators, superhuman elite soldiers who have been sent to investigate a wrecked spaceship drifting in interstellar space; the other player takes the role of Tyranid Genestealers, an aggressive alien species that have made their home aboard the wreck.

An expansion set, Deathwing, introduces the Deathwing Company (First Company) of the Dark Angels Space Marines Chapter, including the Captain and the Librarian. The expansion includes:

- New rules and additional Terminator weapons, greatly expanding the tactical possibilities for the Terminator player.
- New rules allowing the Space Marine player to play the game solo.
- Additional board sections that could be added to the original Space Hulk board.
- Several new missions.

Deathwing is not a complete game — a copy of Space Hulk is needed in order to play.

== Publication history ==
In 1989, Games Workshop released the two-player board game Space Hulk. The game proved popular and also won an Origins Award for Best Fantasy or Science Fiction Boardgame of 1989. and a series of extra scenarios and rules appeared in the magazines White Dwarf and Citadel Journal. The earliest articles from White Dwarf were collected and published in 1990 as two separate expansion packs — Deathwing and Genestealer — and most of the later articles were published in 1991 as a book, Space Hulk Campaigns.

Deathwing was designed by Richard Halliwell and Jervis Johnson, with interior art by Tony Cottrell, Wayne England, David Gallagher, and Richard Wright, and cover art by Chris Baker.

== Reception ==
In the April 1991 edition of Dragon (Issue #168), Ken Rolston complimented the original Space Hulk game for its "fast pace of play and lots of action and mayhem." About the new expansion, Rolston commented that "The Deathwing set contains some useful supplemental material and more scenarios."

== Reviews ==
- Casus Belli #60
