= Evil Genius 2: World Domination =

- Developer: Rebellion Developments
- Publisher: Rebellion Developments
- Producer: Ash Tregay
- Designer: Rich Edwards
- Programmer: Robert Myall
- Artist: Ian Pestridge
- Writers: Guy Adams; Kate Heartfield; Paul Krueger; Wayne Santos
- Composer: James Hannigan
- Platforms: Microsoft Windows; PlayStation 4; PlayStation 5; Xbox One; Xbox Series X/S
- Release: Microsoft Windows; 30 March 2021; PlayStation 4, PlayStation 5, Xbox One, Xbox Series X/S; 30 November 2021
- Genres: Real-time strategy, simulation
- Mode: Single-player

Evil Genius 2: World Domination is a real-time strategy and simulation video game developed and published by Rebellion Developments. As the sequel to Evil Genius (2004), which was developed by the now-defunct Elixir Studios, the game was released for Microsoft Windows on 30 March 2021, and PlayStation 4, PlayStation 5, Xbox One, and Xbox Series X/S on 30 November 2021.

== Gameplay ==
In Evil Genius 2, the player is tasked to construct a criminal lair on an abandoned island which may be a tropical or an ice island depending on the players choice in order to build a doomsday device secretly while operating a casino as a cover operation. Players have to construct extra rooms from the pre-built casino which may be larger or smaller depending on which island you picked. You can also add decor and gambling stations to support the cover operation and the inner operations of the base with the cover operations lowering the resolve of infiltrating agents and distracting them . There are four evil geniuses for players to choose from at the beginning of the game, each of whom has their own unique missions, specialties and doomsday devices. Players also need to choose from three islands which have different designs and features. Inside the base, the players can train various minions into three different classes: Muscle, Deception, and Science. Each minion has unique personalities and traits. For instance, some minions are more observant than others, allowing them to detect suspicious individuals.

Players need to send their minions to the world to complete missions and commit crimes in order to collect gold. Players would gradually construct their own criminal network, and recruit powerful crime bosses as their henchmen. Players can also complete side stories in order to unlock minion specialists or special loot items. As the player's operations expand, they will attract the attention of the Forces of Justice, which will send agents to investigate and infiltrate the player's base. Players can test their doomsday device in different parts of the world whenever they want, though the Forces of Justice will try to intervene. The minions can be sent into high alert, where they would try to actively seek, capture or kill the intruder. The ultimate objective of the game's narrative campaign is to take over the world and deploy the weapon of mass destruction which would then prompt the Forces of Justice to surrender.

Among the playable villains include a former spymaster Emma (voiced by Samantha Bond), tyrant and ex-henchman Red Ivan (Brian Blessed), the gold-fanatic industrialist Maximilian (Glen McCready), and the mad scientist Zalika (Rakie Ayola).

== Development ==
Financial reports at the end of 2004 revealed Elixir Studios, the developer of the first Evil Genius, had begun work on a sequel. However, the studio's closure in 2005 led to the project's cancellation. While Rebellion purchased the intellectual property rights to Elixir's titles, the franchise remained dormant for several years aside from being re-released on digital platforms before the sudden 2010 release of the Facebook app Evil Genius: WMD, which took the IP and applied it to the FarmVille style of apps popular at the time. Rebellion then developed and released Evil Genius Online. Similar to the original, Evil Genius Online maintained the idea of attaining power and building elaborate lairs and hiring minions, progressing using timed missions that could be sped up or bypassed with virtual currency. In a blog post on their website, Rebellion Developments addressed rumours about a 'sequel' that had been circulating via Twitter. Specifically, the post said that this was not in reference to Evil Genius Online, but instead concerned a fully featured PC follow-up:

We've always wanted to make a fully-featured PC follow-up. We've taken concepts for an Evil Genius sequel to publishers before but we weren't able to secure the funding we needed. However since then, we've looked into alternative ways to get this game funded and created. We are going to make this happen. And it's going to be soon.

Evil Genius 2 was announced by Rebellion in July 2017 as being in development since Q2 2017. The game also utilizes Rebellion's in-house Asura engine. At E3 2019 Rebellion premiered the first trailer for the sequel, titled Evil Genius 2: World Domination, and stated that the game would be released on Steam sometime in 2020. The game was delayed to 2021 due to the COVID-19 pandemic, which slowed down the pace of the game's development. The game was released on 30 March 2021. In August 2021, it was announced that the game would be released for PlayStation 4, PlayStation 5, Xbox One, and Xbox Series X/S on 30 November 2021.

== Reception ==
Reception

Aggregate score
Aggregator	Score
Metacritic	75/100

Review scores
Publication	Score
Destructoid	8.5/10
Game Informer	7/10
GameSpot	7/10
Hardcore Gamer	4/5
IGN	6/10
Jeuxvideo.com	15/20
PC Gamer (US)	75/100
PCMag	3.5/5
Push Square	8/10
Shacknews	9/10
The Guardian	4/5
CGMagazine	7.5/10

Evil Genius 2 received "generally favorable" reviews from critics, according to the review aggregation website Metacritic.

=== Awards and accolades ===
The game was nominated for Best Sim/Strategy Game at The Game Awards 2021.
