= AlphaGo (film) =

2017 American documentary by Greg Kohs

- Poster
- Directed by: Greg Kohs
- Produced by: Gary Krieg; Kevin Proudfoot; Josh Rosen
- Production companies: Moxie Pictures; Reel As Dirt
- Distributed by: Netflix
- Release date: September 29, 2017
- Running time: 90 minutes
- Country: United States
- Languages: English; Korean

AlphaGo is a 2017 documentary directed by Greg Kohs about the Google DeepMind Challenge Match with top-ranked Go player Lee Sedol.

== Premise ==
The film presents how AlphaGo, a computer program developed by DeepMind Technologies, mastered the game of Go through artificial intelligence. Its competence was tested by Lee Sedol, a South Korean world champion.

== Release ==
AlphaGo was released in New York City on September 29, 2017, and Los Angeles the next month.

== Reception ==
=== Critical response ===
AlphaGo earned positive reviews. On Rotten Tomatoes, the film has an approval rating of 100%, with an average score of 8/10, based on 10 reviews. Charlotte O'Sullivan of Evening Standard gave the film 4 stars out of five, calling it a "gripping, emotional documentary, which gets us thinking, about thinking, in a whole new way".

=== Accolades ===
Award nominations for AlphaGo
Year	Category	Institution or publication	Result	Notes	Ref.
2017	Best Documentary Feature	Anchorage International Film Festival	Nominated	—N/a	
2017	Best Sports Documentary	Critics' Choice Documentary Awards	Nominated	—N/a	
2017	Maysles Brothers Award, Best Documentary	Denver International Film Festival	Won	—N/a	
2017	Student Choice Award	Philadelphia Film Festival	Nominated	—N/a	
2017	Knowledge is Power Science Prize	Traverse City Film Festival	Won	—N/a	
2017	Audience Award, documentary feature	Warsaw International Film Festival	Won	—N/a	
2018	Best Trailer	New Media Film Festival	Won	—N/a	

== See also ==
- The Thinking Game
