= Genestealer (board game) =

Tabletop game addition

Cover art for Genestealer, 1990

Genestealer is an expansion set published by Games Workshop in 1990 for the science fiction board game Space Hulk.

== Description ==
Genestealer is an expansion which adds psychic combat to Space Hulk, as well as Genestealer Hybrids armed with various ranged weaponry.

== Reception ==
In the April 1991 edition of Dragon (Issue #168), Ken Rolston thought the "charming 'space magic,' card-driven, psychic-powers system [...] adds lots of flavor while completely altering the balance of game elements — a good thing if you've played the Space Hulk game to death and worked out all the basic tactics."

== Awards ==
In 1991, Genestealer won the Origins Award for Best Fantasy or Science Fiction Boardgame of 1990.

== Reviews ==
- Casus Belli #60
