= Evil Genius (video game) =

2004 video game

- Developer: Elixir Studios
- Publishers: Sierra Entertainment (Vivendi Universal Games)
- Producer: Peter Gilbert
- Designer: Sandro Sammarco
- Programmer: Alex Thomson
- Artist: Brian Gillies
- Composer: James Hannigan
- Platform: Microsoft Windows
- Release: NA: 28 September 2004; EU: 1 October 2004; AU: 14 October 2005
- Genres: Real-time strategy, simulation
- Mode: Single-player

Evil Genius is a single-player real-time strategy and simulation video game developed by Elixir Studios and published by Sierra Entertainment, a subsidiary of Vivendi Universal Games. It was released on 28 September 2004. The game is inspired by the spy thriller genre (notably the James Bond film series), and is set in an alternative 1960s–70s era. Most closely resembling Dungeon Keeper, the gameplay puts players in charge of a villainous force attempting to achieve global domination whilst fending off the forces of justice; to this end the gameplay is split between management of a base and the completion of "acts of infamy" in the rest of the world. The game has stylish, cartoon-like visuals and contains a great deal of tongue-in-cheek humour, particularly playing to clichés of the spy genre.

Elixir once worked on a sequel, but it was cancelled following the studio's closure. Since 2 March 2006, the intellectual property rights of the game have been owned by Rebellion Developments. Rebellion released a sequel, Evil Genius 2: World Domination, on 30 March 2021.

== Gameplay ==
Evil Genius contains a mixture of real-time strategy and simulation elements, and is described by Rebellion Developments as a "real-time mad scientist lair management strategic simulation". Gameplay is split between managing a lair, together with the "minions" that populate it, and the "World Domination screen". The game is set in a non-specific time period, with the use of historic regions (the Eastern Bloc) and events (the Cuban Missile Crisis) suggestive of the 1960s and 1970s, albeit in an alternate timeline; furthermore, the styling of the game is reminiscent of the 1960s Atomic Age designs. Evil Genius consists of a single game mode wherein the ultimate goal is to build a doomsday device and force the capitulation of the world to the player's "Evil Genius". This figure is selected at the beginning of the game from one of three choices—Maximilian, Alexis or Shen Yu—and acts as the player's avatar; if killed, the game ends.

A player-made lair containing several rooms and objects being used by minions.

The first lair is constructed within the base of a mountain on a desert island. During the course of the game the player relocates to a larger, tropical island, the extinct volcano at the center of which is used as the foundation for a rocket silo. The lair comprises various rooms, each of which contains objects for use by minions, either for the replenishment of certain "stats" (e.g. objects in the Mess Hall restore endurance) or to provide a function (e.g. the Power Plant room contains objects that generate power and allow the lair to function). Corridors connect the rooms within the lair and can also contain traps, which serve as one of several ways to deter agents of justice and their attempts to enter the base and gather evidence, steal money, or sabotage equipment. Trap results vary from simple confusion and movement impairment to stat reduction and death, and catching agents within a combination of traps will reward the player with money. New objects can eventually be unlocked through the Laboratory via combining already-existing items with pieces of equipment.

The player's forces include their Evil Genius, unique henchmen, and various minions. The Evil Genius and henchmen may be directly controlled by the player while minions are managed through the use of orders (such as: create room, buy/build item, move item, or even attack or weaken target). Minions are all initially recruited as Construction (yellow) minions which are the only type that can create rooms in the lair. As the game progresses, Construction minions may also be trained to specialize in one of three color-coded fields: military (orange), scientific (blue), or social (purple). Each field has three successive minion levels, with the third level having two specialized branches. All of the minion specializations are unlocked by acquiring and interrogating civilian hostages, after which their skills can be passed on to other minions via training equipment. Henchmen are unique named characters that are much stronger than conventional Minions and can be upgraded with two special moves after gaining experience. Each of the three Evil Geniuses are paired with a specific henchman that is available from the beginning of the game, while additional henchmen may be recruited as the game progresses.

The "World Domination screen". White dots highlight "Acts of Infamy" yet to be completed and the minions available are displayed at the bottom.

In addition to managing their lair, the Evil Genius's plans frequently involve taking action across the world. This is managed through the "World Domination screen", consisting of an interactive map of the world divided into regions to which the player is able to send minions from their lair to steal money or to plan and commit missions known as "Acts of Infamy". These Acts can be used to obtain loot to adorn the lair (increasing minion statuses), capture civilian hostages (to interrogate them), and to garner "Notoriety". Many Acts advance the ultimate goal of constructing the doomsday device. Acts require variable amounts and types of minions, and each carries a degree of risk. Although the player has no direct control over a mission, they can increase the chance of success by mixing minion classes and allocating greater numbers; the danger of committing Acts is compounded by the occasional appearance of Agents in certain regions, which the player can choose to hide their minions from. Some Acts of Infamy are references to historical events, such as the Cuban Missile Crisis, while others are comical, such as a "humanitarian mission" to destroy Nashville, Tennessee and rid the world of country music.

The lair must be defended from the "forces of justice": five government counter-terrorist agencies under whose control the world is split. S.A.B.R.E controls Western Europe, Australasia, the Indian subcontinent and Southern Africa. P.A.T.R.I.O.T controls North America and the "Pacific Allies" (Japan, South Korea, and Taiwan). H.A.M.M.E.R controls the Soviet Union, the Eastern Bloc, and Cuba. A.N.V.I.L controls China and Southeast Asia. S.M.A.S.H controls the remainder of the world with the Middle East, Northern and Central Africa, South America, and Antarctica. Any Act of Infamy carried out within a region, and even the mere presence of minions (but especially if they are siphoning money back to the lair) will increase the level of notice, or "Heat", of the alliance that controls it, triggering a proportionate response: those alliances with the highest levels of heat will send their most skilled forces. Agents, appearing singularly or in groups, are divided according to their roles: Investigators, who will try to uncover evidence of illegal operations, thus increasing "Heat"; Saboteurs, whose goal is to destroy parts of the base; Thieves, who will attempt to steal back stolen items and cash; and Soldiers, who will assault minions, henchmen and the Evil Genius him/herself. As the player acquires "Notoriety", they will attract the attention of "Super Agents", one from each of the five alliances; these agents combine two of the aforementioned roles, require special objectives to be met to permanently defeat, and are able to kill henchmen over time by depleting their pool of lives.

== Development ==
The game was in development for two years and two months. with between 20 and 25 people working on it at various times.

== Reception ==
Reception

Aggregate scores
Aggregator	Score
GameRankings	78%
Metacritic	75/100

Review scores
Publication	Score
1Up.com	B−
Computer and Video Games	8.4/10
Eurogamer	7/10
GameSpot	7.3/10
GameSpy	4/5
IGN	7.8/10

Evil Genius has an average review score of 78% and 75 out of a possible 100, according to the review aggregators GameRankings and Metacritic respectively, which indicates "generally favourable reviews". Most critics praised the game for its humour and unique take on the god-game genre, but also criticised it for its frustrating micromanagement and annoying bugs.

GameSpot gave the game a 7.3 out of 10, stating that "while Evil Genius' dry, campy humor is often amusing from the start, it takes quite a bit of time and effort to pull off acts of infamy and establish your notoriety among global powers" and states "Evil Genius is hampered by some frustratingly haphazard pacing as well as issues with the artificial intelligence of your minions".

IGN gave Evil Genius a 7.8 out of 10, the reviewer stating that "Evil Genius hearkens back to the glorious Bullfrog creation Dungeon Keeper. Not only did it have us building a base underground (far, far underground), but also put us in the shoes of a sadistic dungeon master with imps, demons, and horned reapers to "control". There are quite a few differences in the two titles, but the influence is certainly there" but went on to say that "had there been more interactivity with during acts of infamy on the World Domination Map, less micromanagement for taking care of enemies, more information passing between the map and the base screens, and more useful information about why things happened the way they did, Evil Genius really could have been genius... but in a good way".

Eurogamer gave Evil Genius a 7 out of 10, commenting that "even as we sit here picking over the carcass, we're not actually all that angry about the things that are wrong with the game. They're bad on paper, but they didn't interfere hugely with our having fun - a sure sign that that Evil Genius overcomes its flaws and ultimately satisfies".

Evil Genius' music score, composed by James Hannigan, received a BAFTA nomination for Best Original Music in 2004. Hannigan has spoken of how the work he did for the game stands out amongst his oeuvre, on account of its "uniqueness".

== Sequel ==
Financial reports at the end of 2004 revealed Elixir Studios had begun work on a sequel to Evil Genius. However, the studio's closure in 2005 led to the project's cancellation. While Rebellion purchased the intellectual property rights to Elixir's titles, the franchise remained dormant for several years aside from being re-released on digital platforms and the release of several online games. A proper sequel, Evil Genius 2: World Domination, was released by Rebellion on 30 March 2021.

== See also ==
- Startopia
