= James Hannigan =

British composer (born 1971)

James Hannigan FRSA
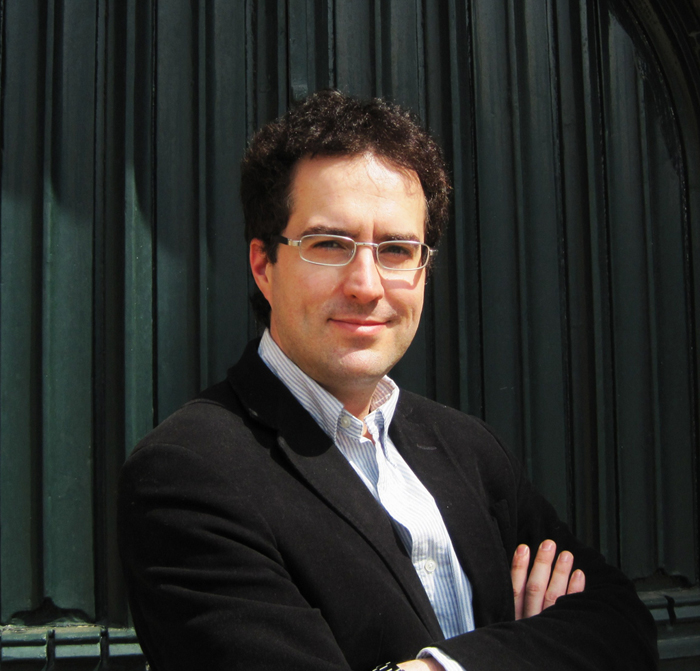

Background information
- Born: 23 July 1971 (age 55)
- Genres: Soundtrack; contemporary classical; post-industrial; dark ambient; video game music; film score
- Occupation: Composer
- Labels: Visceral Games; Nettwerk America; Extreme Music; Universal Music; West One Music; EA Games Soundtrack; Du Vinage Publishing; Sumthing Distribution
- Website: jameshannigan.com

James Hannigan (born 23 July 1971) is a BAFTA Award winning television, game, and film composer. His credits include entries in the Harry Potter, Command & Conquer, Dead Space, RuneScape, Evil Genius, FIFA, The Lord of the Rings, and Theme Park game series; full-cast adaptations of The Sandman (DC Comics/Audible) and the Audie Award winning Alien dramas (2016–2019).

The composer is known for themes such as the parodic Red Alert 3 Theme - Soviet March. In 2022, James Hannigan composed a new orchestral theme for the Discworld universe. Hannigan's music is regularly used in television shows and has been heard in many productions including BBC America's Primeval, BBC's Top Gear, Amazon's The Grand Tour, Disney's The World According to Jeff Goldblum and other productions. He also created music for the bestselling series of Harry Potter audiobooks read by Stephen Fry. A conference founder and writer, he has created music industry events such as Screen Music Connect and Game Music Connect (held between 2013 and 2019 at London's Southbank Centre) and has written articles for Classic FM, Pixel Addict, and Develop (UK magazine).

== Awards ==
Hannigan's music scores have been nominated five times by the British Academy of Film and Television Arts (BAFTA) and Hannigan won a BAFTA Award with Electronic Arts in 2000 for Sim Theme Park (UK title: Theme Park World). In 2010 his score for the Harry Potter and the Half-Blood Prince video game received a BAFTA nomination and won an International Film Music Critics Association (IFMCA) award. In 2014, Hannigan was nominated for a Develop Award for his work on RuneScape. His other BAFTA-nominated scores include those of Republic: The Revolution, FA Premier League Manager and Evil Genius. In 2022, The Sandman Act II received a Webby People's Choice Award for Music and Sound Design.

== Live recording ==
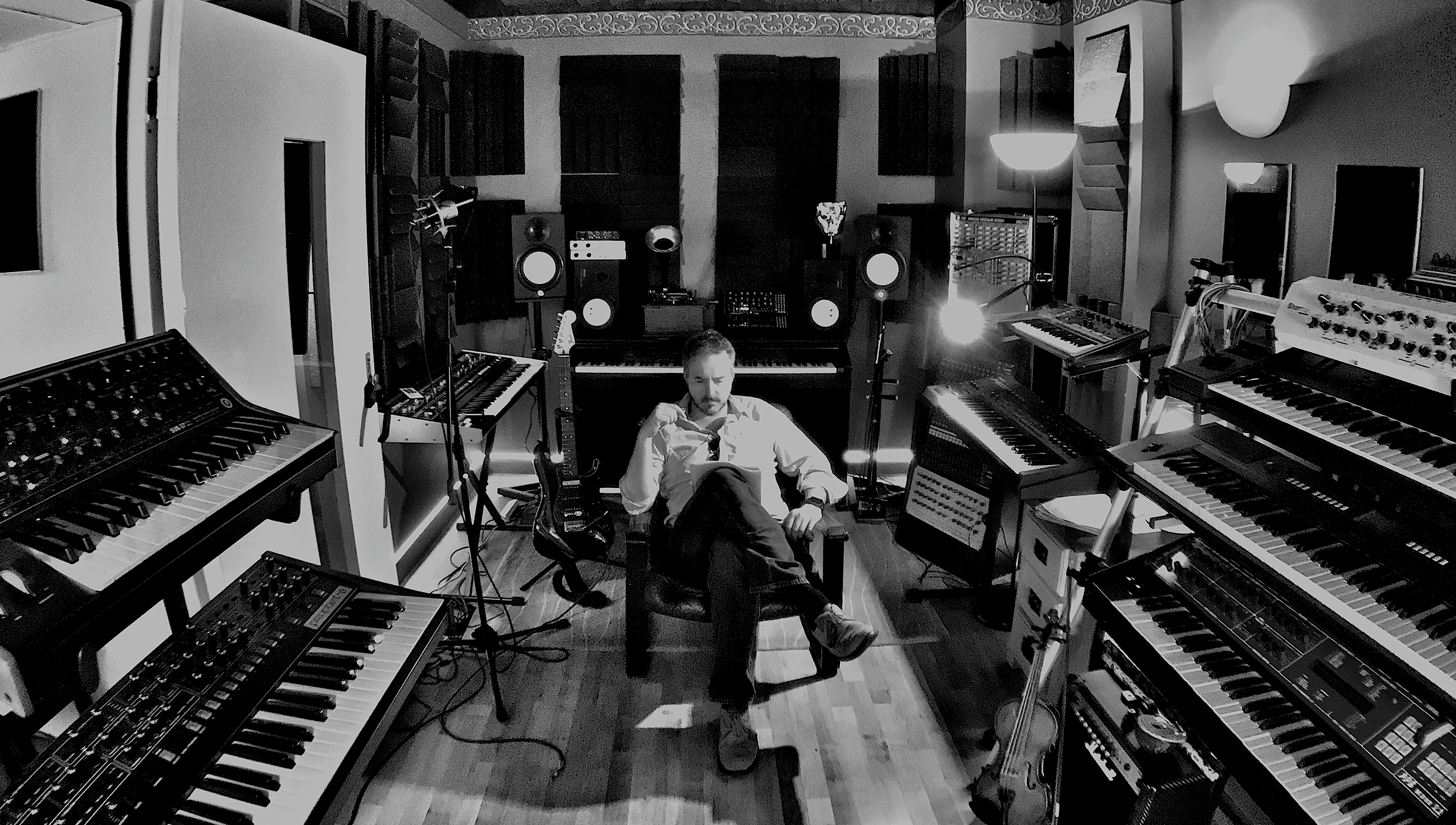
James Hannigan in his studio

Hannigan has worked with the Philharmonia Orchestra, The Skywalker Symphony Orchestra, The Slovak Symphony Orchestra, The Budapest Film Orchestra, and The Chamber Orchestra of London, recording at Abbey Road Studios, AIR Studios and Skywalker Ranch. The composer is known to be an analogue synthesizer enthusiast.

== The Sandman (Audible Originals/DC Comics) and other audio production ==
On July 15, 2020, Audible released an adaptation of the comic book series as a multi-part audio drama directed by Dirk Maggs with music by James Hannigan. The voice cast included Gaiman as the Narrator, James McAvoy as Dream, Kat Dennings as Death, Taron Egerton as John Constantine, Michael Sheen as Lucifer, Riz Ahmed as the Corinthian, Andy Serkis as Matthew the Raven, Samantha Morton as Urania Blackwell, Bebe Neuwirth as The Siamese Cat, Arthur Darvill as William Shakespeare, and Justin Vivian Bond as Desire. The production spent two months at #1 in The New York Times Best Seller list

The follow-up, The Sandman: Act II, was released on 22 September 2021, and featured most of the original cast. New additions to the cast included: Regé-Jean Page as Orpheus, Jeffrey Wright as Destiny, Brian Cox as Augustus, Emma Corrin as Thessaly, John Lithgow as Joshua Norton, David Tennant as Loki, Bill Nighy as Odin, Kristen Schaal as Delirium, Kevin Smith as Merv Pumpkinhead, and Niamh Walsh as Nuala. Neuwirth also returned, but portrayed Bast.

In The Sandman: Act III, actor Regé-Jean Page was heard singing Hannigan's The Song of Orpheus in English, in the episode of the same name. The composer posted footage of the orchestral session on YouTube.

Hannigan has also scored the Audi-award winning Alien series of Audible Originals, including Alien: Out of the Shadows, Alien: River of Pain, Alien: Sea of Sorrows, and Alien 3, with series cast members including Michael Biehn, Lance Henriksen, and Rutger Hauer. The series was directed by Dirk Maggs.

Hannigan composed music introducing the Harry Potter series of audiobooks read by Stephen Fry, the intro music for Penguin Random House Audio's production of Terry Pratchett's Discworld, along with the full-cast audio drama Unseen Academicals. The Discworld main audiobook theme was released on Spotify in 2024. His music has also been heard in BBC Radio 4 productions including Neverwhere and Good Omens. Neverwhere featured cast members such as Benedict Cumberbatch, James McAvoy, and the late Christopher Lee.

== Interactive music career ==
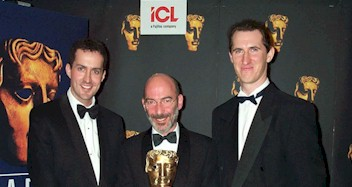
Hannigan, Richard Joseph and Nick Laviers at the BAFTA Interactive Awards 2000

In the early years of his career in the 1990s, Hannigan worked as composer for Electronic Arts Europe before basing his studio at Pinewood Studios in England for ten years between 1997 and 2007, where he sometimes worked as a sound designer on films alongside composing. His sound design credits include New Line Cinema's Lost in Space, which was nominated for a Golden Reel Award.

At EA, Hannigan became involved in devising interactive music playback systems for video games during the early days of digital audio and streaming, and went on to form a strong working relationship with the company. His early work at EA included God games such as Beasts and Bumpkins, EA Sports titles in the F1 and FIFA series, Privateer 2: The Darkening, and various entries in the Theme Park series including Theme Park World (US title: Sim Theme Park) and Theme Park Inc.

In the course of his career, Hannigan has worked with several well-known figures from the chip music and 8-bit gaming era, including Richard Joseph, Mark Knight, and Commodore 64 maestro, Martin Galway. The former two were among the first to invite Hannigan into the games industry during the early 1990s to compose for titles such as Warhammer: Shadow of the Horned Rat and Flight of the Amazon Queen, while Martin Galway, then Audio Director at Digital Anvil and working on several titles for Chris Roberts, invited Hannigan to compose for Conquest: Frontier Wars and Freelancer. Hannigan had earlier worked on Wing Commander related titles such as Privateer 2: The Darkening.

Privateer 2 featured Full-motion video and its movie component starred Christopher Walken, John Hurt, and Clive Owen. The composer would later work on other games integrating full-cast film productions, such as Command & Conquer: Red Alert 3 with a cast including Tim Curry, J. K. Simmons, and Jonathan Pryce, and later, Command & Conquer 4: Tiberian Twilight.

Freelancer's soundtrack was released on Nile Rodgers' Sumthing Else Music Works label in 2003, but was subsequently removed when the company went out of business in 2010.

Certain cues for Conquest: Frontier Wars and Freelancer were recorded by Hannigan with a full orchestra, unusual during this era of game development.

One of Hannigan's best-known themes is Red Alert 3 Theme: Soviet March, which has been streamed hundreds of millions of times on platforms such as YouTube, and over 27 million times on Spotify at the time of writing. The theme, along with other cues including Frank Klepacki's Hell March 3, was recorded with the Skywalker Symphony Orchestra at Skywalker Sound in Marin County, California. Soviet March, a parodic take on Soviet-era military music, has become a widespread internet meme.

Hannigan has posted videos on the subject of his early interactive music system design for titles such as Republic: The Revolution (designed by Google DeepMind founder Demis Hassabis) on YouTube. The composer would go on to score the fully orchestral Evil Genius, also developed by Hassabis's company, Elixir Studios, and each game would receive BAFTA nominations for Original Music at the BAFTA Games Awards in 2003 and 2004 respectively.

James Hannigan provided music for the videogame Infestation in 1999, created by Frontier Developments. In an article posted on the composer's website entitled "Press Start to Compose" Hannigan describes himself as a BBC Micro, Elite and David Braben fan, citing his work on Infestation for Braben's company as an "early career bucket-list moment". He also talks about his collection of vintage arcade machines.

In 2018, James Hannigan and Jagex released an orchestral album of Runescape music featuring orchestral renditions on earlier Runescape tunes along with new music by Hannigan, entitled Runescape: The Orchestral Collection. The album was recorded at Abbey Road Studio 1 in London with the Philharmonia Orchestra and conducted by Allan Wilson. Earlier, in 2013, Hannigan had recorded several new orchestral cues for RuneScape 3 with the Slovak Radio Symphony Orchestra.

In 2015, Hannigan contributed music for Terraria: Otherworld, which was subsequently cancelled. A soundtrack was later released and some of the music has been used in the main Terraria game. After a period away from games, Hannigan returned to the industry to score Steelrising and Evil Genius 2 in 2021.

Some of Hannigan's other game credits include Dead Space 3, Steelrising, Transformers Universe, FA Premier League Manager, Art Academy, Cloudy With a Chance of Meatballs, Harry Potter and the Order of the Phoenix, Harry Potter and the Half-Blood Prince, Catwoman, Harry Potter and the Deathly Hallows, Grand Prix 4, F1 2000, and Call of Antia. The composer recorded his Harry Potter scores at Air studios and Abbey Road Studios with Philharmonia Orchestra. Soundtracks were released for Harry Potter and the Order of the Phoenix and Harry Potter and the Half-Blood Prince, but later withdrawn when Electronic Arts lost its license to create Harry Potter video games. Much of the music would later be re-released on the EA Music Composer Series label in the form of EA Music Composer Series Volumes 1 and 2, currently available on digital music outlets.

The operatic score of 1999's FA Premier League Manager featured performances by soprano Miranda Keys, who would record again with Hannigan many years later for 2022's Steelrising, which also featured performances from the Budapest Film Orchestra.

== Screen Music Connect and other conferences ==
In 2013, James Hannigan founded popular yearly conference Game Music Connect with friend and industry commentator, John Broomhall. Held each year at London’s Southbank Centre, the event partnered with PRS For Music, Playstation and British Academy of Film and Television Arts (BAFTA). Running for three years between 2013 and 2015, events featured numerous panels with leading composers, and keynote speeches from industry executives from Electronic Arts, Sony Interactive Entertainment and others.

In 2018, it was announced that James Hannigan had founded a new London-based conference on film, television, game and virtual reality music, to be known as 'Screen Music Connect'.

The composer has talked at numerous conferences and events, including NY Comic Con alongside Neil Gaiman, Kat Dennings and James McAvoy, Musicworks and The BAFTA Interactive Festival. In 2012 James Hannigan was made the subject of BAFTA's Conversations With Composers, held at the Albert Hall.

James Hannigan has spoken at the Royal College of Music, has joined panels at NY Comic Con and academic conferences including Ludomusicology.

== Written publications ==
In 2004, Hannigan wrote "Changing Our Tune", a cover article for the UK's Develop magazine, outlining some of the differences between scoring for games and conventional linear media forms such as film and television. It was the magazine's first audio related cover feature.

In 2010, Hannigan was interviewed for Tom Hoover’s book, “Soundtrack Nation: Interviews with Today's Top Professionals in Film, Videogame, and Television Scoring”.

In 2015, he wrote a series of articles on video game music for Classic FM.

In 2016, Hannigan wrote a foreword for Tim Summer's book, Understanding Video Game Music, published by Cambridge University Press.

The composer started a blog in 2024 and has written on the subject of AI Music and its implications in an article entitled "AI's Hollow Harmony". He has also written on his love of retro technology and the arcades of the 1980s, showcasing his studio arcade.

== Public performances ==
In 2007, a collage of Hannigan's music entitled Welcome to Hogwarts was added to Video Games Live debuting in London at the Royal Festival Hall on 22 October 2007, and featuring the Philharmonia orchestra.

James Hannigan's music from The Sandman has been used for several installations and launch events, including the Dream Portal at New York Comic Con, 2022.

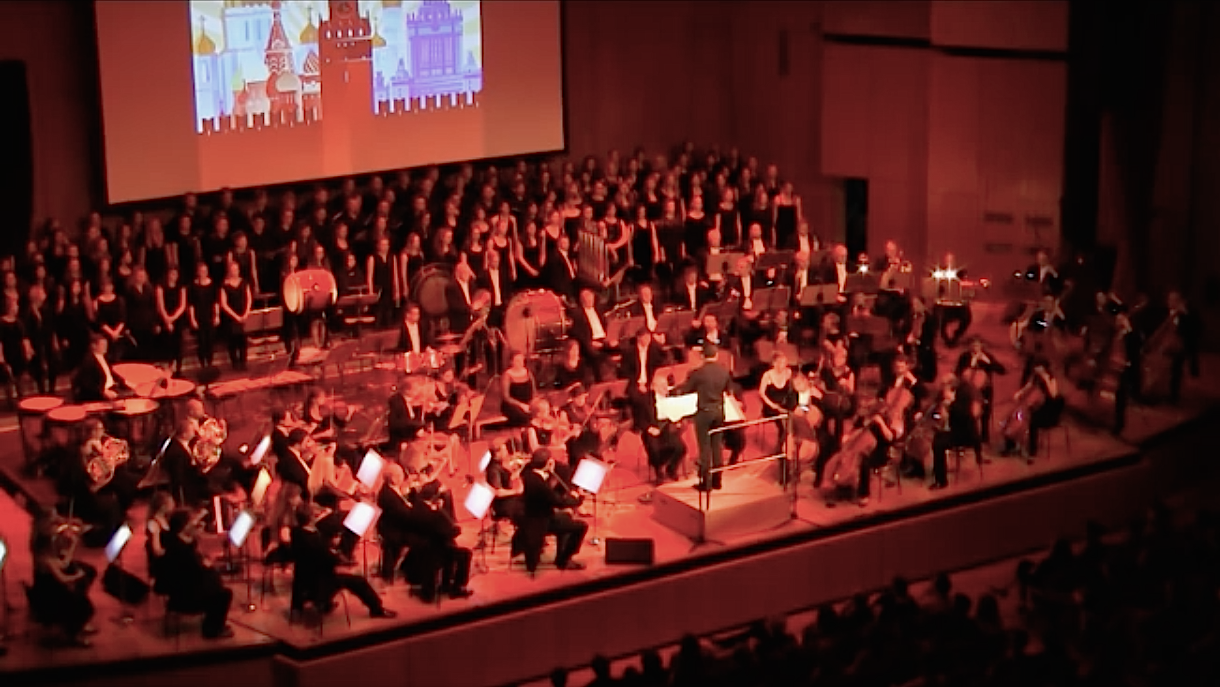
Video Games Music Live performing the Red Alert 3 Theme

Hannigan's 'Soviet March' theme from Command and Conquer: Red Alert 3 was performed at 'A Night in Fantasia', by the Eminence Symphony Orchestra at the Sydney Entertainment Centre, Australia on 26 September 2009. The popular track can be heard on YouTube. Other public performances include Video Games Music Live and the Games & Symphonies concert series.

On 28 October 2010, a concert of Hannigan's music was held at St. Mary's Church, Nottingham, England. As part of the GameCity 2010 Festival, the concert featured The Pinewood Singers and soloists performing the theme of 'Harry Potter and the Deathly Hallows – Part 1', pieces from Command and Conquer: Red Alert 3, Evil Genius and other titles

In May 2018, it was announced that there would be a performance of Hannigan's RuneScape music by the Royal Philharmonic Concert Orchestra at RuneFest 2018.

James Hannigan's music for RuneScape was performed in 2024 by the Metropole Orkest in the Netherlands as part of the Games in Concert series.

== Partial list of credited works ==
- Steelrising (Spiders Studio/NACON)
- Discworld (by Terry Pratchett; Penguin Random House)
- The Sandman (Acts ii and iii, By Neil Gaiman; DC Comics/Audible/Amazon; Webby People's Voice Award, Best Score and Sound Design)
- The Sandman (Act i, By Neil Gaiman; DC Comics/Audible/Amazon)
- Evil Genius 2 (Rebellion Developments)
- Call of Antia (FunPlus)
- Alien III (By William Gibson; Audible)
- RuneScape: The Orchestral Collection
- Super Smash Bros. Ultimate (Additional Music; Nintendo)
- Unseen Academicals (Audible/Amazon)
- Alien: Sea of Sorrows
- Alien: River of Pain (Audible/Amazon)
- Alien: Out of the Shadows (Audible/Amazon)
- Dead Space 3 (Electronic Arts)
- Terraria: Otherworld (as guest composer)
- Harry Potter and the Order of the Phoenix (EA/Warner Bros. 'Best of 2007', IGN; 'Best VG Score', Movie Music UK Awards 2007).
- Super Smash Bros. Wii U (Nintendo)
- Transformers Universe
- Neverwhere (BBC)
- RuneScape (Jagex Studio)
- Good Omens (BBC)
- Harry Potter and the Deathly Hallows: Part 2 (EA Bright Light Studio)
- Harry Potter and the Deathly Hallows: Part 1 (EA Bright Light Studio)
- Command and Conquer: Red Alert 3 (Electronic Arts)
- Command and Conquer 4: Tiberian Twilight (EA LA)
- Harry Potter audio books (Nar: Stephen Fry; Pottermore)
- Primeval (Impossible Pictures/ITV)
- Art Academy (Nintendo/Headstrong)
- The Lord of the Rings: Aragorn's Quest (Headstrong/Warner Bros.)
- Freelancer (Digital Anvil/Microsoft)
- Harry Potter audiobook series (Read by Stephen Fry; Audible)
- Harry Potter and the Half-Blood Prince (Electronic Arts/Warner Bros; BAFTA nomination, 2010)
- Cloudy with a Chance of Meatballs (Ubisoft/Sony Pictures)
- Saints Row IV (additional music)
- Evil Genius (VU Games. BAFTA Nomination, Music, 2005)
- Command and Conquer: Red Alert 3 Uprising (EA LA)
- Command and Conquer: Red Alert 3 Commander's Challenge (EA LA)
- Republic The Revolution (Eidos. BAFTA Nomination, Music, 2004)
- Conquest: Frontier Wars (Digital Anvil/Ubisoft)
- Dance Moms (Tribal Council, The Hostage)
- Warhammer: SotHR (Mindscape; Games Workshop)
- NASCAR Thunder 2004 (2003), Electronic Arts, Inc.
- NASCAR Racing 2002 Season (2002), Sierra Entertainment, Inc.
- NASCAR Thunder 2003 (2002), Electronic Arts, Inc.
- F1 2000 (EA Sports)
- F1 Manager (EA Sports)
- FIFA 96, FIFA 98 (EA Sports)
- Theme Park World (Sim Theme Park in US) (EA/Bullfrog; BAFTA Award, 2000)
- Hasbro Family Game Night 3 (EA Bright Light)
- Grand Prix 4 (Infogrames)
- Brute Force (Digital Anvil/Microsoft. Co-composed with Jesper Kyd and Mike Reagan)
- Catwoman (EA/Warner Bros.)
- Reign of Fire (KUJU/BAM)
- Mr. Bean (VG)
- Lost In Space (Sound Design; New Line Cinema)
- Theme Park Inc. (Simcoaster in US) (EA/Bullfrog)
- Warhammer: Dark Omen (Electronic Arts; Sound Design)
- Action Man (Hasbro/Intelligent Games; multiple titles in the series)
- Privateer: The Darkening (Electronic Arts, Origin Systems)
- FA Premier League Manager(EA Sports; BAFTA Nomination, 2000)
- FIFA Soccer Manager (EA Sports)
- Cutthroat Island (Software Creations)
- Short Cuts series (Chappell)
- Big Screen (West One Music)
- Distorted Reality (Chappell)
- Jetix (multiple titles in the series)
- Flight of the Amazon Queen (Renegade)
- Yamaha SuperCross
- ATV Racing
- Infestation (Frontier Developments)
- MoHo (Lost Toys)
- Ball Breakers
- Beasts and Bumpkins (Electronic Arts)
- Gummy Bears Crazy Golf (Beyond Reality Games)
- Darklight Conflict (Electronic Arts; additional music)
- Space Hulk (Electronic Arts/Games Workshop; music for the PlayStation version)
