= List of Focus Entertainment games =

This list contains all games published by Focus Entertainment (formerly Focus Home Interactive).

== List ==
Title	Platform(s)	Release date	Developer(s)	Ref.
Cycling Manager	Microsoft Windows	2001	Cyanide	
Cycling Manager 2	Microsoft Windows	June 21, 2002	Cyanide	
Virtual Skipper 2	Microsoft Windows	September 2002	Nadeo	
Runaway: A Road Adventure	Microsoft Windows	March 21, 2003	Péndulo Studios	
Cycling Manager 3	Microsoft Windows	June 20, 2003	Cyanide	
TrackMania	Microsoft Windows	November 21, 2003	Nadeo	
Pro Rugby Manager	Microsoft Windows	March 26, 2004	Cyanide	
Chaos League	Microsoft Windows	June 25, 2004	Cyanide	
Cycling Manager 4	Microsoft Windows	June 25, 2004	Cyanide	
TrackMania Sunrise	Microsoft Windows	April 6, 2005	Nadeo	
80 Days	Microsoft Windows	November 4, 2005	Frogwares	
Virtual Skipper 4	Microsoft Windows	November 10, 2005	Nadeo	
Chaos League: Sudden Death	Microsoft Windows	June 23, 2005	Cyanide	
Pro Cycling Manager	Microsoft Windows	June 30, 2005	Cyanide	
Fire Department: Episode 3	Microsoft Windows	March 30, 2006	Kyiv's Games	
Runaway 2: The Dream of the Turtle	Microsoft Windows	November 17, 2006	Péndulo Studios / Ácaro Multimedia	
TrackMania United	Microsoft Windows	November 17, 2006	Nadeo	
Sherlock Holmes: The Awakened	Microsoft Windows	November 25, 2006	Frogwares	
Runaway 2: The Dream of the Turtle	Nintendo DS	November 30, 2006	Cyanide	
Virtual Skipper 5: 32nd America's Cup: The Game	Microsoft Windows	April 20, 2007	Nadeo	
Pink Panther: Saving Planet Earth	Microsoft Windows	May 7, 2007	Compedia	
Loki	Microsoft Windows	June 12, 2007	Cyanide	
Pro Cycling Manager: Season 2007	Microsoft Windows	June 2007	Cyanide	
Jack Keane	Microsoft Windows	October 18, 2007	Deck13	
Escape from Paradise City	Microsoft Windows	October 25, 2007	Sirius Games	
Sherlock Holmes Versus Arsène Lupin	Microsoft Windows	October 25, 2007	Frogwares	
Pro Cycling: Season 2007	PlayStation Portable	2007	Cyanide	
Dracula: Origin	Microsoft Windows	May 29, 2008	Frogwares	
Pro Cycling Manager: Season 2008	Microsoft Windows	June 2008	Cyanide	
TrackMania DS	Nintendo DS	November 14, 2008	Firebrand Games	
Sherlock Holmes Versus Jack the Ripper	Microsoft Windows	April 30, 2009	Frogwares	
Blood Bowl	Microsoft Windows	June 26, 2009	Cyanide	
Ceville	Microsoft Windows	July 2, 2009	Realmforge Studios	
Pro Cycling Manager: Season 2009	Microsoft Windows	July 10, 2009	Cyanide	
Le Tour de France 2009: The Official Game	Xbox Live Arcade	July 15, 2009	Cyanide	
Blood Bowl	Nintendo DS	September 18, 2009	Cyanide	
Blood Bowl	PlayStation Portable	September 18, 2009	Cyanide	
Runaway: A Twist of Fate	Microsoft Windows	November 26, 2009	Péndulo Studios	
Runaway 2: The Dream of the Turtle	Wii	2009	Péndulo Studios	
Blood Bowl	Xbox 360	January 26, 2010	Cyanide	
TOW: Things on Wheels	Xbox Live Arcade	May 12, 2010	Load	
World of Battles	Microsoft Windows	May 28, 2010	Frogwares	
Pro Cycling Manager: Season 2010	Microsoft Windows	June 16, 2010	Cyanide	
Sherlock Holmes and the Mystery of Osborne House	Nintendo DS	June 25, 2010	Frogwares / Smack Down Productions	
TrackMania: Build to Race	Wii	September 23, 2010	Firebrand Games	
TrackMania Turbo	Nintendo DS	September 23, 2010	Firebrand Games	
Cities XL 2011	Microsoft Windows	October 14, 2010	Monte Cristo	
Divinity II: The Dragon Knight Saga	Microsoft Windows	November 4, 2010	Larian Studios	
Faery: Legends of Avalon	Xbox Live Arcade	November 9, 2010	Spiders	
Runaway: A Twist of Fate	Nintendo DS	2010	Péndulo Studios	
Faery: Legends of Avalon	PlayStation Network	January 12, 2011	Spiders	
Wallace & Gromit's Grand Adventures	Microsoft Windows	February 11, 2011	Telltale Games	
The Next Big Thing	Microsoft Windows	April 20, 2011	Péndulo Studios	
Faery: Legends of Avalon	Microsoft Windows	April 21, 2011	Spiders	
Divinity II: The Dragon Knight Saga	Xbox 360	May 12, 2011	Larian Studios	
Pro Cycling Manager: Season 2011	Microsoft Windows	June 24, 2011	Cyanide	
Le Tour de France	PlayStation 3	July 1, 2011	Cyanide	
Le Tour de France	Xbox 360	July 1, 2011	Cyanide	
Rotastic	Xbox 360	September 21, 2011	Dancing Dots Studio	
A Game of Thrones: Genesis	Microsoft Windows	September 29, 2011	Cyanide Montreal	
Cities XL 2012	Microsoft Windows	October 20, 2011	Focus Entertainment	
Sherlock Holmes: The Case of the Silver Earring	Wii	November 2011	Frogwares	
Wargame: European Escalation	Microsoft Windows	February 23, 2012	Eugen Systems	
Yesterday	Microsoft Windows	March 22, 2012	Péndulo Studios	
Confrontation	Microsoft Windows	April 5, 2012	Cyanide	
Game of Thrones	PlayStation 3	May 15, 2012	Cyanide	
Game of Thrones	Xbox 360	May 15, 2012	Cyanide	
Game of Thrones	Microsoft Windows	June 7, 2012	Cyanide	
Pro Cycling Manager: Season 2012	Microsoft Windows	June 22, 2012	Cyanide	
Le Tour de France 2012	PlayStation 3	June 2012	Cyanide	
Le Tour de France 2012	Xbox 360	June 2012	Cyanide	
R.A.W: Realms of Ancient War	Xbox Live Arcade	September 9, 2012	Wizarbox	
The Testament of Sherlock Holmes	Microsoft Windows	September 21, 2012	Frogwares	
The Testament of Sherlock Holmes	PlayStation 3	September 21, 2012	Spiders	
The Testament of Sherlock Holmes	Xbox 360	September 21, 2012	Spiders	
R.A.W: Realms of Ancient War	PlayStation Network	September 25, 2012	Wizarbox	
Blood Bowl: Chaos Edition	Microsoft Windows	October 11, 2012	Cyanide	
Of Orcs and Men	Microsoft Windows	October 11, 2012	Cyanide / Spiders	
Of Orcs and Men	PlayStation 3	October 11, 2012	Cyanide / Spiders	
Of Orcs and Men	Xbox 360	October 11, 2012	Cyanide / Spiders	
R.A.W: Realms of Ancient War	Microsoft Windows	October 11, 2012	Wizarbox	
Rotastic	Microsoft Windows	October 11, 2012	Dancing Dots Studio	
Farming Simulator 2013	Microsoft Windows	October 25, 2012	Giants Software	
Sherlock Holmes: The Mystery of the Frozen City	Nintendo 3DS	October 2012	WaterLily Games	
Rotastic	PlayStation 3	December 4, 2012	Dancing Dots Studio	
Another World: 20th Anniversary Edition	Mac OS	April 4, 2013	DotEmu	
Mars: War Logs	Microsoft Windows	April 26, 2013	Spiders	
Wargame: AirLand Battle	Microsoft Windows	May 29, 2013	Eugen Systems	
Magrunner: Dark Pulse	Microsoft Windows	June 20, 2013	3 AM Games	
Pro Cycling Manager: Season 2013	Microsoft Windows	June 21, 2013	Cyanide	
Farming Simulator 3D	Nintendo 3DS	June 23, 2013	Giants Software	
Le Tour de France 2013: 100th Edition	PlayStation 3	July 2, 2013	Cyanide	
Le Tour de France 2013: 100th Edition	Xbox 360	July 2, 2013	Cyanide	
Mars: War Logs	Xbox Live Arcade	July 26, 2013	Spiders	
Mars: War Logs	PlayStation Network	August 13, 2013	Spiders	
Magrunner: Dark Pulse	PlayStation Network	October 22, 2013	3 AM Games	
Magrunner: Dark Pulse	Xbox Live Arcade	October 25, 2013	3 AM Games	
Final Exam	Microsoft Windows	November 5, 2013	Mighty Rocket Studio	
Final Exam	PlayStation Network	November 5, 2013	Mighty Rocket Studio	
Final Exam	Xbox Live Arcade	November 5, 2013	Mighty Rocket Studio	
Contrast	Microsoft Windows	November 15, 2013	Compulsion Games	
Contrast	PlayStation Network	November 15, 2013	Compulsion Games	
Contrast	Xbox Live Arcade	November 15, 2013	Compulsion Games	
Wargame: Red Dragon	Microsoft Windows	April 17, 2014	Eugen Systems	
Bound by Flame	Microsoft Windows	May 7, 2014	Spiders	
Bound by Flame	PlayStation 3	May 7, 2014	Spiders	
Bound by Flame	PlayStation 4	May 7, 2014	Spiders	
Bound by Flame	Xbox 360	May 7, 2014	Spiders	
Space Run	Microsoft Windows	June 13, 2014	Passtech Games	
Pro Cycling Manager 2014	Microsoft Windows	June 19, 2014	Cyanide	
Farming Simulator 14	PlayStation Vita	June 24, 2014	Giants Software	
Le Tour de France: Season 2014	PlayStation 3	July 8, 2014	Cyanide	
Le Tour de France: Season 2014	Xbox 360	July 8, 2014	Cyanide	
Le Tour de France: Season 2014	PlayStation 4	July 22, 2014	Cyanide	
Crimes & Punishments: Sherlock Holmes	Microsoft Windows	September 30, 2014	Frogwares	
Crimes & Punishments: Sherlock Holmes	PlayStation 3	September 30, 2014	Frogwares	
Crimes & Punishments: Sherlock Holmes	PlayStation 4	September 30, 2014	Frogwares	
Crimes & Punishments: Sherlock Holmes	Xbox 360	September 30, 2014	Frogwares	
Crimes & Punishments: Sherlock Holmes	Xbox One	September 30, 2014	Frogwares	
Styx: Master of Shadows	Microsoft Windows	October 7, 2014	Cyanide	
Styx: Master of Shadows	PlayStation 4	October 7, 2014	Cyanide	
Styx: Master of Shadows	Xbox One	October 7, 2014	Cyanide	
Farming Simulator 15	Microsoft Windows	October 30, 2014	Giants Software	
Pix the Cat	Microsoft Windows	January 29, 2015	Pastagames	
Cities XXL	Microsoft Windows	February 5, 2015	Focus Entertainment	
Etherium	Microsoft Windows	March 25, 2015	Tindalos Interactive	
Farming Simulator 15	PlayStation 3	May 19, 2015	Giants Software	
Farming Simulator 15	PlayStation 4	May 19, 2015	Giants Software	
Farming Simulator 15	Xbox 360	May 19, 2015	Giants Software	
Farming Simulator 15	Xbox One	May 19, 2015	Giants Software	
Le Tour de France: Season 2015	PlayStation 4	June 18, 2015	Cyanide	
Le Tour de France: Season 2015	Xbox One	June 18, 2015	Cyanide	
Pro Cycling Manager 2015	Microsoft Windows	June 18, 2015	Cyanide	
Act of Aggression	Microsoft Windows	September 2, 2015	Eugen Systems	
Blood Bowl 2	Microsoft Windows	September 22, 2015	Cyanide	
Blood Bowl 2	PlayStation 4	September 22, 2015	Cyanide	
Blood Bowl 2	Xbox One	September 22, 2015	Cyanide	
Farming Simulator 16	Android	September 22, 2015	Giants Software	
Farming Simulator 16	iOS	September 22, 2015	Giants Software	
Farming Simulator 16	Windows Phone	September 22, 2015	Giants Software	
Farming Simulator 16	PlayStation Vita	October 12, 2015	Giants Software	
Divinity: Original Sin - Enhanced Edition	PlayStation 4	October 27, 2015	Larian Studios	
Divinity: Original Sin - Enhanced Edition	Xbox One	October 27, 2015	Larian Studios	
Mordheim: City of the Damned	Microsoft Windows	November 19, 2015	Rogue Factor	
Battlefleet Gothic: Armada	Microsoft Windows	April 21, 2016	Tindalos Interactive	
Act of Aggression: Reboot Edition	Microsoft Windows	May 10, 2016	Eugen Systems	
Le Tour de France: Season 2016	PlayStation 4	June 16, 2016	Cyanide	
Le Tour de France: Season 2016	Xbox One	June 16, 2016	Cyanide	
Pro Cycling Manager 2016	Microsoft Windows	June 16, 2016	Cyanide	
Space Run Galaxy	Microsoft Windows	June 17, 2016	Passtech Games	
The Technomancer	Microsoft Windows	June 28, 2016	Spiders	
The Technomancer	PlayStation 4	June 28, 2016	Spiders	
The Technomancer	Xbox One	June 28, 2016	Spiders	
Seasons After Fall	Microsoft Windows	September 2, 2016	Swing Swing Submarine	
Mordheim: City of the Damned	PlayStation 4	October 18, 2016	Rogue Factor	
Mordheim: City of the Damned	Xbox One	October 18, 2016	Rogue Factor	
Farming Simulator 17	Microsoft Windows	October 25, 2016	Giants Software	
Farming Simulator 17	PlayStation 4	October 25, 2016	Giants Software	
Farming Simulator 17	Xbox One	October 25, 2016	Giants Software	
Space Hulk: Deathwing	Microsoft Windows	December 14, 2016	Streum On Studio / Cyanide	
Styx: Shards of Darkness	Microsoft Windows	March 14, 2017	Cyanide	
Styx: Shards of Darkness	PlayStation 4	March 14, 2017	Cyanide	
Styx: Shards of Darkness	Xbox One	March 14, 2017	Cyanide	
Shiness: The Lightning Kingdom	Microsoft Windows	April 18, 2017	Enigami	
Shiness: The Lightning Kingdom	PlayStation 4	April 18, 2017	Enigami	
Shiness: The Lightning Kingdom	Xbox One	April 18, 2017	Enigami	
Seasons After Fall	PlayStation 4	May 16, 2017	Swing Swing Submarine	
Seasons After Fall	Xbox One	May 16, 2017	Swing Swing Submarine	
The Surge	Microsoft Windows	May 16, 2017	Deck13	
The Surge	PlayStation 4	May 16, 2017	Deck13	
The Surge	Xbox One	May 16, 2017	Deck13	
Farming Simulator 18	Nintendo 3DS	June 6, 2017	Giants Software	
Farming Simulator 18	PlayStation 4	June 6, 2017	Giants Software	
Farming Simulator 18	PlayStation Vita	June 6, 2017	Giants Software	
Le Tour de France: Season 2017	PlayStation 4	June 16, 2017	Cyanide	
Le Tour de France: Season 2017	Xbox One	June 16, 2017	Cyanide	
Pro Cycling Manager 2017	Microsoft Windows	June 16, 2017	Cyanide	
MudRunner	Microsoft Windows	October 31, 2017	Saber Interactive	
MudRunner	PlayStation 4	October 31, 2017	Saber Interactive	
MudRunner	Xbox One	October 31, 2017	Saber Interactive	
Farming Simulator: Nintendo Switch Edition	Nintendo Switch	November 7, 2017	Giants Software	
The Council: Episode 1 - The Mad Ones	Microsoft Windows	March 13, 2018	Big Bad Wolf	
The Council: Episode 1 - The Mad Ones	PlayStation 4	March 13, 2018	Big Bad Wolf	
The Council: Episode 1 - The Mad Ones	Xbox One	March 13, 2018	Big Bad Wolf	
Masters of Anima	Microsoft Windows	April 10, 2018	Passtech Games	
Masters of Anima	Nintendo Switch	April 10, 2018	Passtech Games	
Masters of Anima	PlayStation 4	April 10, 2018	Passtech Games	
Masters of Anima	Xbox One	April 10, 2018	Passtech Games	
The Council: Episode 2 - Hide and Seek	Microsoft Windows	May 15, 2018	Big Bad Wolf	
The Council: Episode 2 - Hide and Seek	PlayStation 4	May 15, 2018	Big Bad Wolf	
The Council: Episode 2 - Hide and Seek	Xbox One	May 15, 2018	Big Bad Wolf	
Space Hulk: Deathwing - Enhanced Edition	Microsoft Windows	May 22, 2018	Streum On Studio	
Vampyr	Microsoft Windows	June 5, 2018	Dontnod Entertainment	
Vampyr	PlayStation 4	June 5, 2018	Dontnod Entertainment	
Vampyr	Xbox One	June 5, 2018	Dontnod Entertainment	
Le Tour de France: Season 2018	PlayStation 4	June 28, 2018	Cyanide	
Le Tour de France: Season 2018	Xbox One	June 28, 2018	Cyanide	
Pro Cycling Manager 2018	Microsoft Windows	June 28, 2018	Cyanide	
The Council: Episode 3 - Ripples	Microsoft Windows	July 24, 2018	Big Bad Wolf	
The Council: Episode 3 - Ripples	PlayStation 4	July 24, 2018	Big Bad Wolf	
The Council: Episode 3 - Ripples	Xbox One	July 24, 2018	Big Bad Wolf	
The Council: Episode 4 - Burning Bridge	Microsoft Windows	September 25, 2018	Big Bad Wolf	
The Council: Episode 4 - Burning Bridge	PlayStation 4	September 25, 2018	Big Bad Wolf	
The Council: Episode 4 - Burning Bridge	Xbox One	September 25, 2018	Big Bad Wolf	
Space Hulk: Tactics	Microsoft Windows	October 9, 2018	Cyanide	
Space Hulk: Tactics	PlayStation 4	October 9, 2018	Cyanide	
Space Hulk: Tactics	Xbox One	October 9, 2018	Cyanide	
Call of Cthulhu	Microsoft Windows	October 30, 2018	Cyanide	
Call of Cthulhu	PlayStation 4	October 30, 2018	Cyanide	
Call of Cthulhu	Xbox One	October 30, 2018	Cyanide	
Farming Simulator 19	Microsoft Windows	November 19, 2018	Giants Software	
Farming Simulator 19	PlayStation 4	November 19, 2018	Giants Software	
Farming Simulator 19	Xbox One	November 19, 2018	Giants Software	
MudRunner: American Wilds	Nintendo Switch	November 27, 2018	Saber Interactive	
The Council: Episode 5 - Checkmate	Microsoft Windows	December 4, 2018	Big Bad Wolf	
The Council: Episode 5 - Checkmate	PlayStation 4	December 4, 2018	Big Bad Wolf	
The Council: Episode 5 - Checkmate	Xbox One	December 4, 2018	Big Bad Wolf	
Battlefleet Gothic: Armada II	Microsoft Windows	January 24, 2019	Tindalos Interactive	
A Plague Tale: Innocence	Microsoft Windows	May 14, 2019	Asobo Studio	
A Plague Tale: Innocence	PlayStation 4	May 14, 2019	Asobo Studio	
A Plague Tale: Innocence	Xbox One	May 14, 2019	Asobo Studio	
Fear the Wolves	Microsoft Windows	June 2, 2019	Vostok Games	
GreedFall	Microsoft Windows	September 10, 2019	Spiders	
GreedFall	PlayStation 4	September 10, 2019	Spiders	
GreedFall	Xbox One	September 10, 2019	Spiders	
The Surge 2	Microsoft Windows	September 24, 2019	Deck13	
The Surge 2	PlayStation 4	September 24, 2019	Deck13	
The Surge 2	Xbox One	September 24, 2019	Deck13	
Call of Cthulhu	Nintendo Switch	October 8, 2019	Saber Interactive	
Vampyr	Nintendo Switch	October 29, 2019	Dontnod Entertainment	
Farming Simulator 19	Google Stadia	December 19, 2019	Giants Software	
Farming Simulator 20	Android	December 3, 2019	Giants Software	
Farming Simulator 20	iOS	December 3, 2019	Giants Software	
Farming Simulator 20	Nintendo Switch	December 3, 2019	Giants Software	
SnowRunner	Microsoft Windows	April 28, 2020	Saber Interactive	
SnowRunner	PlayStation 4	April 28, 2020	Saber Interactive	
SnowRunner	Xbox One	April 28, 2020	Saber Interactive	
Othercide	Microsoft Windows	July 28, 2020	Lightbulb Crew	
Othercide	PlayStation 4	July 28, 2020	Lightbulb Crew	
Othercide	Xbox One	July 28, 2020	Lightbulb Crew	
Necromunda: Underhive Wars	Microsoft Windows	September 8, 2020	Rogue Factor	
Necromunda: Underhive Wars	PlayStation 4	September 8, 2020	Rogue Factor	
Necromunda: Underhive Wars	Xbox One	September 8, 2020	Rogue Factor	
Othercide	Nintendo Switch	September 10, 2020	Lightbulb Crew	
Shady Part of Me	Microsoft Windows	December 10, 2020	Douze Dixièmes	
Shady Part of Me	Nintendo Switch	December 10, 2020	Douze Dixièmes	
Shady Part of Me	PlayStation 4	December 10, 2020	Douze Dixièmes	
Shady Part of Me	Xbox One	December 10, 2020	Douze Dixièmes	
Curse of the Dead Gods	Microsoft Windows	February 23, 2021	Passtech Games	
Curse of the Dead Gods	Nintendo Switch	February 23, 2021	Passtech Games	
Curse of the Dead Gods	PlayStation 4	February 23, 2021	Passtech Games	
Curse of the Dead Gods	Xbox One	February 23, 2021	Passtech Games	
Hood: Outlaws & Legends	Microsoft Windows	May 10, 2021	Sumo Digital (Newcastle)	
Hood: Outlaws & Legends	PlayStation 4	May 10, 2021	Sumo Digital (Newcastle)	
Hood: Outlaws & Legends	PlayStation 5	May 10, 2021	Sumo Digital (Newcastle)	
Hood: Outlaws & Legends	Xbox One	May 10, 2021	Sumo Digital (Newcastle)	
Hood: Outlaws & Legends	Xbox Series X/S	May 10, 2021	Sumo Digital (Newcastle)	
SnowRunner	Nintendo Switch	May 18, 2021	Saber Interactive	
Warhammer Age of Sigmar: Storm Ground	Microsoft Windows	May 27, 2021	Gasket Games	
Warhammer Age of Sigmar: Storm Ground	Nintendo Switch	May 27, 2021	Gasket Games	
Warhammer Age of Sigmar: Storm Ground	PlayStation 4	May 27, 2021	Gasket Games	
Warhammer Age of Sigmar: Storm Ground	Xbox One	May 27, 2021	Gasket Games	
Necromunda: Hired Gun	Microsoft Windows	June 1, 2021	Streum On Studio	
Necromunda: Hired Gun	PlayStation 4	June 1, 2021	Streum On Studio	
Necromunda: Hired Gun	PlayStation 5	June 1, 2021	Streum On Studio	
Necromunda: Hired Gun	Xbox One	June 1, 2021	Streum On Studio	
Necromunda: Hired Gun	Xbox Series X/S	June 1, 2021	Streum On Studio	
GreedFall: Gold Edition	PlayStation 5	June 30, 2021	Spiders	
GreedFall: Gold Edition	Xbox Series X/S	June 30, 2021	Spiders	
A Plague Tale: Innocence	Nintendo Switch	July 6, 2021	Asobo Studio	
A Plague Tale: Innocence	PlayStation 5	July 6, 2021	Asobo Studio	
A Plague Tale: Innocence	Xbox Series X/S	July 6, 2021	Asobo Studio	
Aliens: Fireteam Elite	Microsoft Windows	August 24, 2021	Cold Iron Studios	
Aliens: Fireteam Elite	PlayStation 4	August 24, 2021	Cold Iron Studios	
Aliens: Fireteam Elite	PlayStation 5	August 24, 2021	Cold Iron Studios	
Aliens: Fireteam Elite	Xbox One	August 24, 2021	Cold Iron Studios	
Aliens: Fireteam Elite	Xbox Series X/S	August 24, 2021	Cold Iron Studios	
World War Z: Aftermath	Microsoft Windows	September 21, 2021	Saber Interactive	
World War Z: Aftermath	PlayStation 4	September 21, 2021	Saber Interactive	
World War Z: Aftermath	Xbox One	September 21, 2021	Saber Interactive	
Insurgency: Sandstorm	PlayStation 4	September 29, 2021	New World Interactive	
Insurgency: Sandstorm	Xbox One	September 29, 2021	New World Interactive	
Aeon Must Die	Microsoft Windows	October 14, 2021	Limestone Games	
Aeon Must Die	Nintendo Switch	October 14, 2021	Limestone Games	
Aeon Must Die	PlayStation 4	October 14, 2021	Limestone Games	
Aeon Must Die	Xbox One	October 14, 2021	Limestone Games	
Hardspace: Shipbreaker	Microsoft Windows	May 24, 2022	Blackbird Interactive	
Hardspace: Shipbreaker	PlayStation 5	May 24, 2022	Blackbird Interactive	
Hardspace: Shipbreaker	Xbox Series X/S	May 24, 2022	Blackbird Interactive	
SnowRunner	PlayStation 5	May 31, 2022	Saber Interactive	
SnowRunner	Xbox Series X/S	May 31, 2022	Saber Interactive	
A Plague Tale: Requiem	Microsoft Windows	October 18, 2022	Asobo Studio	
A Plague Tale: Requiem	Nintendo Switch	October 18, 2022	Asobo Studio	
A Plague Tale: Requiem	PlayStation 5	October 18, 2022	Asobo Studio	
A Plague Tale: Requiem	Xbox Series X/S	October 18, 2022	Asobo Studio	
Evil West	Microsoft Windows	November 22, 2022	Flying Wild Hog	
Evil West	PlayStation 4	November 22, 2022	Flying Wild Hog	
Evil West	PlayStation 5	November 22, 2022	Flying Wild Hog	
Evil West	Xbox One	November 22, 2022	Flying Wild Hog	
Evil West	Xbox Series X/S	November 22, 2022	Flying Wild Hog	
Blacktail	Windows	December 15, 2022	The Parasight (released under Focus Indie Series)	
Blacktail	PlayStation 5	December 15, 2022	The Parasight (released under Focus Indie Series)	
Blacktail	Xbox Series X/S	December 15, 2022	The Parasight (released under Focus Indie Series)	
Atomic Heart	Microsoft Windows	February 21, 2023	Mundfish	
Atomic Heart	PlayStation 4	February 21, 2023	Mundfish	
Atomic Heart	PlayStation 5	February 21, 2023	Mundfish	
Atomic Heart	Xbox One	February 21, 2023	Mundfish	
Atomic Heart	Xbox Series X/S	February 21, 2023	Mundfish	
Hotel Renovator	Microsoft Windows	March 7, 2023	Two Horizons	
Warhammer 40,000: Boltgun	Microsoft Windows	May 23, 2023	Auroch Digital	
Warhammer 40,000: Boltgun	PlayStation 4	May 23, 2023	Auroch Digital	
Warhammer 40,000: Boltgun	PlayStation 5	May 23, 2023	Auroch Digital	
Warhammer 40,000: Boltgun	Nintendo Switch	May 23, 2023	Auroch Digital	
Warhammer 40,000: Boltgun	Xbox One	May 23, 2023	Auroch Digital	
Warhammer 40,000: Boltgun	Xbox Series X/S	May 23, 2023	Auroch Digital	
Dordogne	Microsoft Windows	June 13, 2023	Un Je Ne Sais Quoi, Umanimation	
Dordogne	Nintendo Switch	June 13, 2023	Un Je Ne Sais Quoi, Umanimation	
Dordogne	PlayStation 4	June 13, 2023	Un Je Ne Sais Quoi, Umanimation	
Dordogne	PlayStation 5	June 13, 2023	Un Je Ne Sais Quoi, Umanimation	
Dordogne	Xbox One	June 13, 2023	Un Je Ne Sais Quoi, Umanimation	
Dordogne	Xbox Series X/S	June 13, 2023	Un Je Ne Sais Quoi, Umanimation	
Aliens: Dark Descent	Microsoft Windows	June 20, 2023	Tindalos Interactive	
Aliens: Dark Descent	PlayStation 4	June 20, 2023	Tindalos Interactive	
Aliens: Dark Descent	PlayStation 5	June 20, 2023	Tindalos Interactive	
Aliens: Dark Descent	Xbox One	June 20, 2023	Tindalos Interactive	
Aliens: Dark Descent	Xbox Series X/S	June 20, 2023	Tindalos Interactive	
Atlas Fallen	Microsoft Windows	August 10, 2023	Deck13	
Atlas Fallen	PlayStation 5	August 10, 2023	Deck13	
Atlas Fallen	Xbox Series X/S	August 10, 2023	Deck13	
Chants of Sennaar	Microsoft Windows	September 5, 2023	Rundisc (released under Focus Indie Series)	
Chants of Sennaar	Nintendo Switch	September 5, 2023	Rundisc (released under Focus Indie Series)	
Chants of Sennaar	PlayStation 4	September 5, 2023	Rundisc (released under Focus Indie Series)	
Chants of Sennaar	Xbox One	September 5, 2023	Rundisc (released under Focus Indie Series)	
Warstride Challenges	Microsoft Windows	September 7, 2023	Dream Powered Games (released under Focus Indie Series)	
Warstride Challenges	PlayStation 5	September 7, 2023	Dream Powered Games (released under Focus Indie Series)	
Warstride Challenges	Xbox Series X/S	September 7, 2023	Dream Powered Games (released under Focus Indie Series)	
My Time at Sandrock	Microsoft Windows	November 2, 2023	Pathea Games	
My Time at Sandrock	Nintendo Switch	November 2, 2023	Pathea Games	
My Time at Sandrock	PlayStation 5	November 2, 2023	Pathea Games	
My Time at Sandrock	Xbox One	November 2, 2023	Pathea Games	
My Time at Sandrock	Xbox Series X/S	November 2, 2023	Pathea Games	
Insurgency: Sandstorm	PlayStation 5	January 30, 2024	New World Interactive	
Insurgency: Sandstorm	Xbox Series X/S	January 30, 2024	New World Interactive	
Banishers: Ghosts of New Eden	Microsoft Windows	February 13, 2024	Don't Nod	
Banishers: Ghosts of New Eden	PlayStation 5	February 13, 2024	Don't Nod	
Banishers: Ghosts of New Eden	Xbox Series X/S	February 13, 2024	Don't Nod	
Expeditions: A MudRunner Game	Microsoft Windows	March 5, 2024	Saber Interactive	
Expeditions: A MudRunner Game	Nintendo Switch	March 5, 2024	Saber Interactive	
Expeditions: A MudRunner Game	PlayStation 4	March 5, 2024	Saber Interactive	
Expeditions: A MudRunner Game	PlayStation 5	March 5, 2024	Saber Interactive	
Expeditions: A MudRunner Game	Xbox One	March 5, 2024	Saber Interactive	
Expeditions: A MudRunner Game	Xbox Series X/S	March 5, 2024	Saber Interactive	
Hotel Renovator	PlayStation 5	March 12, 2024	Two Horizons	
Hotel Renovator	Xbox Series X/S	March 12, 2024	Two Horizons	
Hotel Renovator	PlayStation 4	June 19, 2024	Two Horizons	
Hotel Renovator	Xbox One	June 19, 2024	Two Horizons	
Warhammer 40,000: Space Marine 2	Microsoft Windows	September 9, 2024	Saber Interactive	
Warhammer 40,000: Space Marine 2	PlayStation 5	September 9, 2024	Saber Interactive	
Warhammer 40,000: Space Marine 2	Xbox Series X/S	September 9, 2024	Saber Interactive	
My Time at Sandrock	PlayStation 4	September 13, 2024	Pathea Games	
Void Crew	Microsoft Windows	November 25, 2024	Hutlihut Games	
RoadCraft	Microsoft Windows	May 20, 2025	Saber Interactive	
RoadCraft	PlayStation 5	May 20, 2025	Saber Interactive	
RoadCraft	Xbox Series X/S	May 20, 2025	Saber Interactive	
Void Crew	PlayStation 5	September 4, 2025	Hutlihut Games	
Void Crew	Xbox Series X/S	September 4, 2025	Hutlihut Games	
MIO: Memories in Orbit	Microsoft Windows	January 20, 2026	Douze Dixièmes	
MIO: Memories in Orbit	PlayStation 5	January 20, 2026	Douze Dixièmes	
MIO: Memories in Orbit	Xbox Series X/S	January 20, 2026	Douze Dixièmes	
MIO: Memories in Orbit	Nintendo Switch	January 20, 2026	Douze Dixièmes	
MIO: Memories in Orbit	Nintendo Switch 2	January 20, 2026	Douze Dixièmes	
John Carpenter's Toxic Commando	Microsoft Windows	March 12, 2026	Saber Interactive	
John Carpenter's Toxic Commando	PlayStation 5	March 12, 2026	Saber Interactive	
John Carpenter's Toxic Commando	Xbox Series X/S	March 12, 2026	Saber Interactive	
Yerba Buena	Microsoft Windows	May 26, 2026	Mad About Pandas	
Yerba Buena	PlayStation 5	May 26, 2026	Mad About Pandas	
Yerba Buena	Xbox Series X/S	May 26, 2026	Mad About Pandas	
SnowRunner	Nintendo Switch 2	June 9, 2026	Saber Interactive	
MudRunner	PlayStation 5	August 26, 2026	Saber Interactive	
MudRunner	Xbox Series X/S	August 26, 2026	Saber Interactive	
Resonance: A Plague Tale Legacy	Microsoft Windows	August 27, 2026	Asobo Studio	
Resonance: A Plague Tale Legacy	PlayStation 5	August 27, 2026	Asobo Studio	
Resonance: A Plague Tale Legacy	Xbox Series X/S	August 27, 2026	Asobo Studio	
BioEden	Microsoft Windows	September 3, 2026	Broken Arms Games	
BioEden	Nintendo Switch 2	September 3, 2026	Broken Arms Games	
BioEden	PlayStation 5	September 3, 2026	Broken Arms Games	
BioEden	Xbox Series X/S	September 3, 2026	Broken Arms Games	
Road Kings	Microsoft Windows	March 11, 2027	Saber Interactive	
Road Kings	PlayStation 5	March 11, 2027	Saber Interactive	
Road Kings	Xbox Series X/S	March 11, 2027	Saber Interactive	
Clutch	Microsoft Windows	TBA 2027	Maverick Games	
Clutch	PlayStation 5	TBA 2027	Maverick Games	
Clutch	Xbox Series X/S	TBA 2027	Maverick Games	
Elta: Defy All Gods	Microsoft Windows	TBA 2027	Afterburner Studios	
Elta: Defy All Gods	PlayStation 5	TBA 2027	Afterburner Studios	
Elta: Defy All Gods	Xbox Series X/S	TBA 2027	Afterburner Studios	
Magicians: The Devil's Deal	Microsoft Windows	TBA 2027	Uppercut Games	
Magicians: The Devil's Deal	PlayStation 5	TBA 2027	Uppercut Games	
Magicians: The Devil's Deal	Xbox Series X/S	TBA 2027	Uppercut Games	
Bradley the Badger	Microsoft Windows	TBA	Day 4 Night Studios	
Warhammer 40,000: Space Marine 3	TBA	TBA	Saber Interactive	
Untitled project by Rundisc	TBA	TBA	Rundisc	
