= Jehanne Rousseau =

French game designer

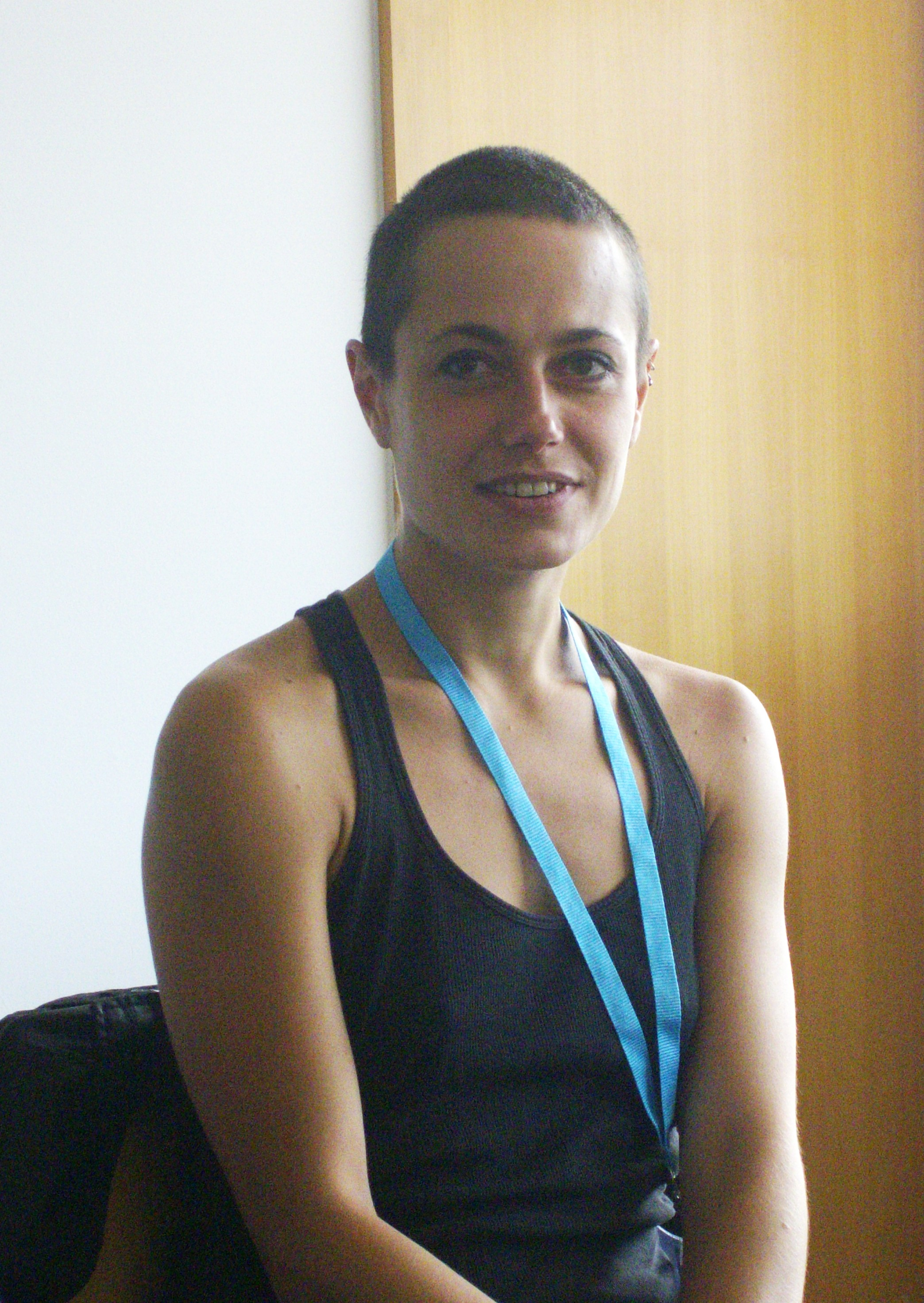

Jehanne Rousseau is a video game producer, co-founder and CEO of Spiders. She was lead writer for GreedFall.

== Career ==
In 1999 Jehanne Rousseau began her career as a 2D graphic designer at RFX Interactive and worked on Tonic Trouble for Game Boy Color. In 2005 she joined Monte Cristo and created the world of Silverfall until Monte Cristo stopped making RPGs.

In 2008 she co-founded and directed the Spiders studio with former Monte Cristo developers. She is also a screenwriter and dialogue writer. GreedFall is Spiders's biggest game a completely new universe with a language, different people, and different factions created from scratch in less than three years.

In 2020, she received the Pegasus Prize for Personality of the Year from the Academy of Video Game Arts and Techniques. She was awarded the Chevalier of the National Order of Merit medal.
