= Olivier Deriviere =

French video game composer (born 1978)

Olivier Derivière
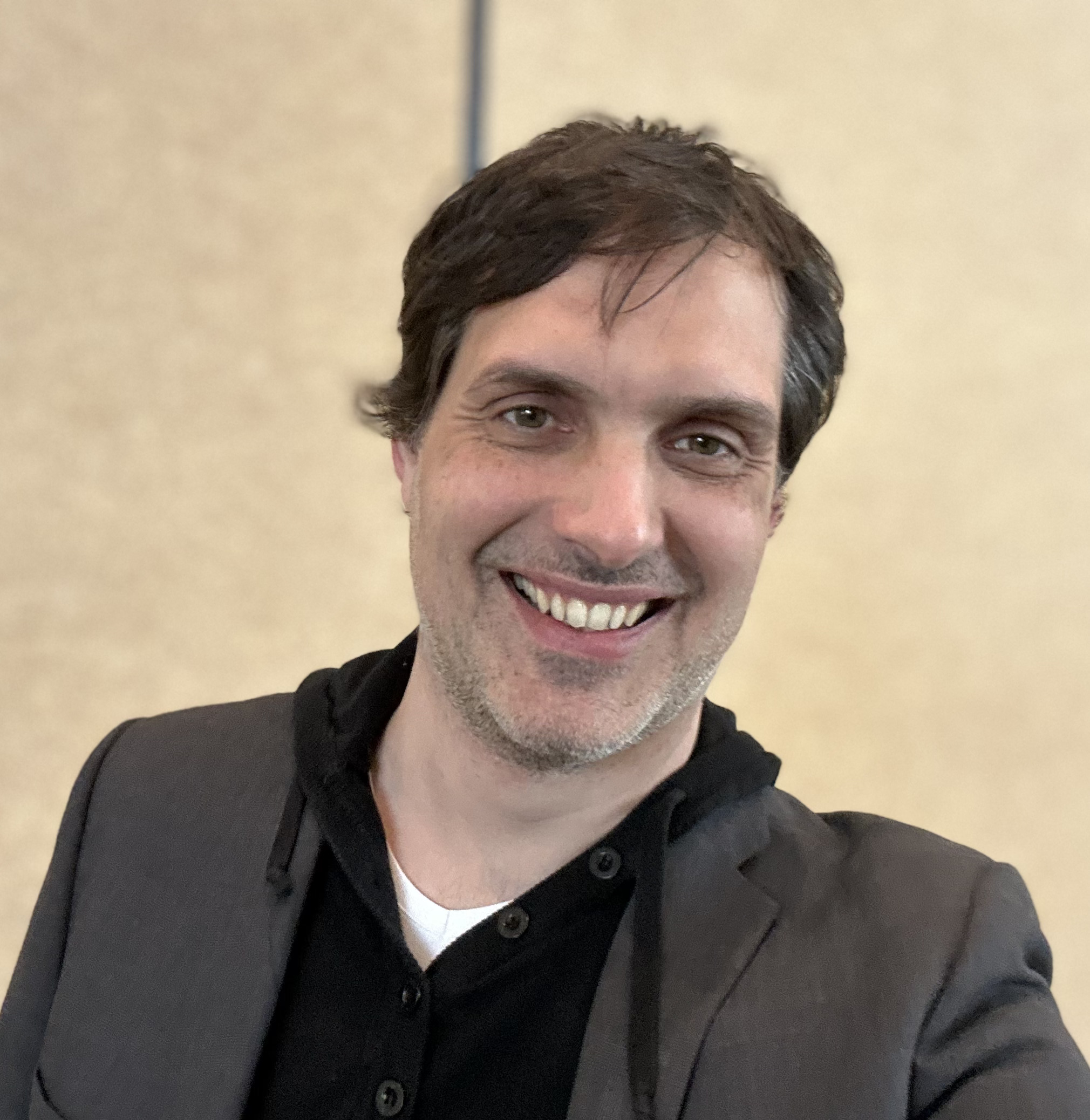
- Derivière at the Game Developers Conference 2025

Background information
- Born: 26 December 1978 (age 47); France
- Genres: Orchestral; electronic; industrial; video game music
- Occupation: Composer
- Website: olivierderiviere.com

Olivier Derivière (born 26 December 1978) is a French video game composer, best known for his work on the Alone in the Dark, Obscure, Remember Me and Streets of Rage 4 soundtracks. His work on Remember Me won the 2013 IFMCA award for Best Original Score for a Video Game or Interactive Media.

== Career ==
Deriviere took interest in music since childhood, studying classical percussion at the age of five. At the age of eight, Deriviere's mother bought a synthesizer, which he used to write various short pieces, and took interest in game music after hearing the main menu theme for Shadow of the Beast, which led to Deriviere taking advanced harmony and orchestration courses. Deriviere received training at the Nice Conservatoire and Berklee College of Music, and made his debut in the game industry with the soundtrack for Obscure.

Following his work on Obscure, Deriviere was contacted by Atari representatives to compose for Alone in the Dark. As the game was more-action oriented, Deriviere sought to compose the music with an epic scale in mind. Deriviere also discussed the game with director David Nadal to ensure a mutual understanding of the soundtrack's approach. In 2010, Deriviere established AMEO Productions, a music production company dedicated to video game scoring. The same year saw the release of Might and Magic: Heroes Kingdoms, for which Deriviere composed the cut-scene music. In 2013, Deriviere composed the soundtrack of Remember Me. Deriviere sought to reflect the game's theme of digitized memories by manipulating the recordings of a live orchestra, giving the impression of synthesized and acoustic instruments. For his work on the soundtrack, Deriviere won the 2013 IFMCA award for Best Original Score for a Video Game or Interactive Media.

In 2018, Deriviere composed for Vampyr, using a cello as the primary instrument to convey a sense of a sense of emptiness and solitude. Other instruments, such as bass flute, piano, double bass and cimbalom, were used to characterise aspects of the story. In the same year, Deriviere composed the soundtrack for 11-11: Memories Retold, having heard of the project during the Nordic Game Conference in Sweden. In 2020, Deriviere served as the lead composer for Streets of Rage 4, with additional music by Yuzo Koshiro, Motohiro Kawashima, Yoko Shimomura, Keiji Yamagishi, Harumi Fujita, XL Middleton, Scattle, Das Mörtal, and Groundislava. Deriviere wrote the game's main themes, while each boss fight's theme was written by one of the guest composers. Deriviere composed the soundtrack of Dying Light 2 Stay Human, which released in 2022. For the music, Deriviere collaborated with the London Contemporary Orchestra, and used a custom-built instrument.

== Discography ==
=== Video games ===
Year	Title	Notes
2004	Obscure	
2006	Championsheep Rally	
2006	My Little Flufties	With Nicolas Laborde
2007	Obscure II	
2008	Alone in the Dark	
2009	The Fall Trilogy	
2009	Might and Magic: Heroes Kingdoms	
2010	Tangled: The Video Game	
2011	Cardboard Castle	
2012	Of Orcs and Men	
2013	Harold	
2013	Remember Me	
2013	Assassin's Creed IV: Black Flag — Freedom Cry	
2014	Bound by Flame	With Markus Schmidt
2015	Life Is Strange	Special thanks
2015	Supernova	
2015	Subject 13	
2016	The Technomancer	
2017	Get Even	
2018	The Council	
2018	Vampyr	
2018	11-11: Memories Retold	
2019	A Plague Tale: Innocence	
2019	GreedFall	
2019	Chernobylite	Special thanks
2020	Streets of Rage 4	With several others
2022	Dying Light 2 Stay Human	
2022	Vampire: The Masquerade – Swansong	
2022	A Plague Tale: Requiem	
2023	Park Beyond	
2025	South of Midnight	
2025	Dying Light: The Beast	
2026	GreedFall: The Dying World	
2026	Resonance: A Plague Tale Legacy	

=== Television ===
Year	Title	Season	Episode
2023	Star Wars: Visions	Volume 2	The Spy Dancer

=== Other work ===
Year	Title
1998	Harry's Day

== Awards and nominations ==
Year	Award	Category	Work	Result	Ref.
2013	International Film Music Critics Association Awards	Best Original Score for a Video Game or Interactive Media	Remember Me	Won	
2017	British Academy Games Awards (BAFTAs)	Best Music	Get Even	Nominated	
2017	Develop Awards	Music Design	Get Even	Nominated	
2017	International Film Music Critics Association Awards	Best Original Score for a Video Game or Interactive Media	Get Even	Nominated	
2018	International Film Music Critics Association Awards	Best Original Score for a Video Game or Interactive Media	11-11: Memories Retold	Nominated	
2019	International Film Music Critics Association Awards	Best Original Score for a Video Game or Interactive Media	A Plague Tale: Innocence	Nominated	
2021	Pégases	Best sound universe	Streets of Rage 4	Won	
2022	The Game Awards	Best Score and Music	A Plague Tale: Requiem	Nominated	
2023	D.I.C.E. Awards	Outstanding Achievement in Original Music Composition	A Plague Tale: Requiem	Nominated	
