= Strength of the Sword 3 =

2013 video game

- Developer(s): Ivent Games
- Publisher(s): Ivent Games
- Designer(s): Lyubomir Iliev
- Programmer(s): Gerogi Rakidov
- Engine: PhyreEngine
- Platform(s): Wii U, PlayStation 3 Microsoft Windows, Linux, PlayStation 4, Xbox One
- Release: PlayStation 3: NA: December 10, 2013; EU: June 5, 2013; Microsoft Windows, Linux, PlayStation 4, Xbox One: WW: August 23, 2019
- Genre(s): Action, hack and slash
- Mode(s): Single player

Strength of the Sword 3 (re-released as Strength of the Sword Ultimate) is a third-person, fast-paced, challenge driven, action beat 'em up video game set in a fantasy realm. The game is produced by the small Bulgarian indie game studio Ivent Games for PlayStation 3, with updated versions released for Microsoft Windows, Linux, PlayStation 4 and Xbox One. The story focuses around Strahil, the former leader of the "Upper Kingdom" and the victim of a cruel plot that led to his imprisonment in a dark cave. As Strahil, you will have to advance through four different locations set on the "Island of Dreams" and seek vengeance from the evil figures behind the plot that led to his imprisonment. Throughout his way Strahil will have to deal with brutal enemies who would prefer to die rather than surrender.

Originally a PlayStation Network exclusive, it was released in Europe on June 5, 2013, and December 10, 2013, in North America for PlayStation 3. A Kickstarter campaign in 2015 received the funding to bring the game to more platforms. It was then released as Strength of the Sword Ultimate on August 23, 2019 for PlayStation 4, Xbox One and Windows through the Steam platform.

== Reception ==
Reception

Aggregate score
Aggregator	Score
Metacritic	PS3: 67/100

Review scores
Publication	Score
GameSpot	6/10
PlayStation Universe	7/10

Strength of the Sword 3 received mixed reviews from critics upon release. On Metacritic, the game holds a score of 67/100 based on 15 reviews, indicating "mixed or average reviews".
