= Deadfall Adventures =

2013 video game

- Box art for the Windows version of the game
- Developer: The Farm 51
- Publisher: Nordic Games
- Composers: Piotr Musial, Pawel Cincio, Arkadiusz Reikowski, Jakub Gawlina
- Engine: Unreal Engine 3
- Platforms: Microsoft Windows, Xbox 360, PlayStation 3
- Release: Microsoft Windows, Xbox 360: WW: November 15, 2013; PlayStation 3: WW: October 28, 2014
- Genres: First-person shooter, action-adventure
- Modes: Single-player, multiplayer

Deadfall Adventures is an action-adventure video game developed by The Farm 51 and published by Nordic Games. Deadfall Adventures was released on November 15, 2013, for Windows and Xbox 360, and on October 28, 2014, for PlayStation 3 under the name of Deadfall Adventures: Heart of Atlantis. The game is set in the universe of the Allan Quatermain series, created by H. Rider Haggard.

== Gameplay ==
Deadfall Adventures is a first person action-adventure video game that takes place before World War II. The protagonist, James Lee Quatermain, is a treasure hunter who fights Nazi soldiers and supernatural enemies through various environments like Egypt, the Arctic, and Mayan ruins. He has a compass that helps him find hidden treasures that improve his stats. He uses Allan Quatermain's notebook to solve puzzles and overcome traps, and a flashlight to travel in dark areas and fend off supernatural enemies like mummies. He can use various weapons like revolvers, shotguns and a knife for melee combat.

== Plot ==
The story takes place in the year 1938, with players assuming the role of famous adventurer Allan Quartermain's great-grandson, James Lee Quatermain. James' goal is to escort a U.S. agent as they travel to Egypt in search for the Heart of Atlantis. Rival factions such as the Nazis and Soviets are looking it for their own purposes.

== Development ==
Deadfall Adventures was developed with Unreal Engine 3. It is reportedly inspired by action-adventure books and movies such as Indiana Jones and adventurer Allan Quartermain (from the novels written by Henry Rider Haggard). The development team researched popular films and also took assistance from movie industry professionals to capture the treasure hunting genre’s tone and look. The game was announced to be released on July 30, 2013, but was delayed twice to September 27 and November 15, 2013, when it was finally released. A collector's edition was released that contains an Allan Quartermain revolver skin for the revolver in single-player mode and three multiplayer skins, a "Making Of" DVD, original soundtrack CD, a printed game manual and a "Bonus Content" DVD that included an artbook. A beta version for Linux was released on December 31, 2013, for those who bought the Windows version of the game on Steam. On June 11, 2014, the developers announced that a PlayStation 3 version titled Deadfall Adventures: Heart of Atlantis would be released in the summer of 2014 with a number of enhancements. The game includes a new co-op survival mode, new boss fights, cutscenes, locations and an improved leveling system.

== Reception ==
Reception

Aggregate scores
Aggregator	Score
GameRankings	PC: 52.37% X360: 45.00%
Metacritic	PC: 53/100; X360: 43/100

Review scores
Publication	Score
Edge	3/10
Game Informer	4/10
GameSpot	3/10
IGN	4/10
Official Xbox Magazine (UK)	4/10
Hardcore Gamer	3/5

The game received a mixed-to-negative reception. The Windows and Xbox 360 versions have scores of 53/100 and 43/100 respectively on Metacritic. Cameron Woolsey of GameSpot gave it a negative review of 3/10, saying "Deadfall Adventures becomes hopelessly predictable, breaking down into a tiresome formula of kill rooms and effortless puzzles." Craig Pearson of IGN gave it a negative review of 4/10 saying "It's an uninspired retread of good concepts, and an unfortunate visitor into a genre with some genuine giants. It might take you on a long trip across the globe to visit some attractive locations, but by the end the only temples I cared for were throbbing away in my head." Jeff Marchiafava of Game Informer gave it a score of 4/10 calling it "An Adventure Best Forgotten". Edge also gave it a review score of 4/10.
