= Get Even (video game) =

2017 first-person shooter video game

- Developer: The Farm 51
- Publisher: Bandai Namco Entertainment
- Directors: Wojciech Pazdur; Artur Fojcik
- Producer: Wojciech Rutkowski
- Designer: Malgorzata Platek
- Programmer: Lukasz Zamyslowski
- Artists: Sebastian Gola; Rafal Trafalski
- Writers: Haris Orkin; Marcin Kiszela; Przemyslaw Pomorski; Stephen Long; Iain Sharkey
- Composer: Olivier Deriviere
- Engine: Unreal Engine 3
- Platforms: Microsoft Windows; PlayStation 4 Xbox One
- Release: 23 June 2017
- Genre: First-person shooter
- Mode: Single-player

Get Even is a first-person shooter psychological thriller video game developed by The Farm 51 and published by Bandai Namco Entertainment for Microsoft Windows, PlayStation 4 and Xbox One. The game was originally scheduled to be released on 26 May 2017, but due to the Manchester Arena bombing, it was delayed to 23 June 2017.

== Gameplay ==
Get Even is played from a first-person perspective, combining elements of shooter, puzzle, and adventure games. As Cole Black, players make their way through an abandoned insane asylum on the orders of the mysterious Red. Along the way he will interact with a number of fellow "inmates," some of whom are friendly, some hostile. At specific points Black will enter a memory regarding a specific event that Red wishes to reconstruct, which are the game's levels. Each concludes with Black returning to the asylum and making his way further into it, until encountering the next memory.

Black is equipped with a smartphone that has five apps: a scanner that can analyze specific objects for evidence; a map with which Black can navigate environments and track enemies; a thermal vision for spotting heat signatures; a phone and messaging app through which various characters communicate with Black; and an ultraviolet (UV) light for detecting trace evidence such as fingerprints and blood.

Throughout each level, there are various notes, photographs, and audio recordings that can be discovered and examined, which are then stored in a special evidence room that can be accessed at specific points during or between levels. Although the gathering of these notes is not required to complete the game, collecting 100% of a level's evidence unlocks a code that can be used to open specific doors in each level.

Combat is similar to that of most first-person shooters, although it is discouraged, with the explanation that killing people threatens the stability of the memory and could cause it to break down completely. The player's preference for either stealth or aggression also affects the ending they receive. Black has access to a small arsenal with which to defeat enemies, including pistols, assault rifles, and shotguns, as well as the option to perform a stealth kill at close quarters. One unique aspect of combat is a device known as the CornerGun. When it is equipped, the player can turn the gun at a 90-degree angle and look and/or fire a weapon in that direction using the smartphone. Combined with the game's emphasis on using cover, it allows the player to fire around corners or over the top of low walls and tables.

Puzzles consist of deciphering codes with which to open doors, or the use of valves and levers to open a particular passage. These often make use of the smartphone's apps in specific ways. Levels also contain anomalies which, when scanned with the smartphone's camera, cause the environment to alter in certain ways, usually to the player's advantage – for example, causing a van to appear in a parking garage so that an enemy's line of sight is diminished, or making a wall vent disappear, thus opening up an alternate route.

At certain points in the game the player will have to make choices that can have consequences later on. For example, an early scene has Black decide whether or not to release an asylum inmate from a cell. Later, he has a choice between rerouting steam through pipes to open a passageway, or bypassing the puzzle by shooting the lock off a door. Like their approach to combat, the player's choices are commented on by Red, and influence the ending of the game.

Late in the game, players take control of Red. While controlling identically to Black, Red does not use the smartphone or CornerGun. Instead, he has the power to assimilate enemies and take their weapons, which he can then use. He also makes use of warp points, which are in specific places in each level, to move quickly and avoid enemies. Instead of the map, he has a sonar vision that allows him to briefly see where enemies and warp points are from a distance. While Red does not collect evidence, he encounters engrams at specific points, which are used to reconstruct memories.

== Plot ==
Cole Black finds himself outside an abandoned building with only one thing on his mind: "save the girl." After infiltrating the building and killing the armed men he finds there, he discovers the girl tied to a chair with a bomb strapped to her chest. Black is unable to defuse the bomb before it explodes.

Black suddenly wakes up in an old, abandoned asylum, with a strange device strapped to his head. He is introduced via television screens to a shadowy figure identifying itself as Red, who tells him the device is known as the Pandora, or Savant, an experimental technology designed to record and play back human memory for analytical purposes. In this case, Red wants Black to explore the circumstances surrounding the girl's kidnapping, claiming that Black had something to do with it, although he cannot remember anything. While making his way through the asylum, Black encounters several fellow inmates, whose fates are ultimately determined by his actions. Many of them refer to Black as the "Puppet Master" and make other references to Alice in Wonderland.

Through the examination of several of his own memories and others provided by Red, Black begins to piece together what happened. He was hired by a man named Robert Ramsey to infiltrate ADS, a weapons contractor, and steal a prototype of their latest invention, the CornerGun. Ramsey then patented the CornerGun as his own creation, nearly bankrupting ADS and humiliating its CEO, Roger Howard. As a reward, Ramsey made Black the head of security for his own company.

Black manages to recall the name Jasper Prado, an Irish mercenary who was killed in suspicious circumstances around the same time as the kidnapping. Further investigation reveals that Jasper was hired by Rose Atkins, Robert Ramsey's research assistant, with whom he had an affair. Atkins, an ambitious, amoral woman, felt she was not getting the credit she deserved for the Pandora project and decided to betray Ramsey. She hired Prado and his men to kidnap Ramsey's daughter Grace and demand the Pandora device as ransom. Black frequently stumbles upon memories that depict Ramsey as a driven man whose obsession with memory—presumably due to his mother's succumbing to some form of mental illness—and the hope that his Pandora device will change the world causes him to neglect his wife Lenore and Grace. Based on these flashbacks and Red's angry response to them, Black deduces that Red is really Robert Ramsey, who confirms this and declares his intention to find out why Grace was taken.

Black remembers himself confronting Rose about the kidnapping and then throwing her out a window, killing her. When Ramsey questions his motives, Black cannot offer a definitive answer. Black's final memory is of himself being approached by Howard, who propositions him to steal the Pandora device as revenge for the CornerGun theft, in exchange for a hefty reward and a purging of Black's criminal record (which Ramsey is apparently using as leverage). Black flatly refuses; Ramsey, however, does not believe this either, and reveals that Black is not in an asylum at all, but incapacitated in a life support chamber. The "world" dissolves around Black as he screams for mercy.

The player then assumes the role of Ramsey, who is sequestered in a basement room filled with technology powering his Pandora device, through which he has been reviewing Black's recall of his memories, while Black himself is still in the life support chamber. With the help of an AI named Hope, Ramsey decides to perform an "audit" of specific memories, believing that Black was deliberately trying to hide something from him. However, these memories are distorted further by Ramsey's own fragile mental state. Distraught over the kidnapping and Lenore's leaving him because of it, Ramsey has Black, who was put in a coma by the bombing, taken from the hospital and put into his care. He discovers Black had some knowledge of the kidnapping, and that the intended target was Lenore, but Prado's impulsiveness led to Grace being taken instead. When Black discovers this, and the fact that Prado has also constructed a bomb against orders, he murders Prado himself and forces Atkins to tell him where Grace is. Unfortunately, he fails to defuse the bomb, which is haphazardly constructed and far too powerful.

In the audit of Black's meeting with Howard, Black again refuses to work for Howard, but this time offers to have Howard work for him, revealing himself as the mastermind behind the kidnapping (hence the "Puppet Master" references). Depending on Black's morality during the game Ramsey either shuts off Black's life support, killing him or sends Black away to a hospital to live out the rest of his comatose life. Suddenly, the room begins to dissolve and a disembodied voice of Grace, which Black has heard throughout the game, condemns her father for causing all this to happen. Overcome with guilt, Ramsey admits that he is a terrible father and husband, who loved both his family and his mistress but could commit to neither, because he wanted his work to make a difference in the world more than anything.

In a final twist, the disembodied voice is revealed to be Grace in the real world; she survived the explosion, but was left paralyzed from the waist down, and has been using the only working Pandora prototype to watch her father's memories, including his watching Black analyze his own memories. Grace can choose to shut down the Pandora link to her father, or watch one final memory: a distraught Ramsey confronts an unrepentant Howard and kills him, before attempting to commit suicide, which has left him in a vegetative state. Atkins – whose death at Black's hands was another false memory – reveals that Ramsey left his company and research to Grace, and urges her to sign a contract allowing work on the Pandora to continue. A disgusted Lenore tries to object, but Grace insists she knows what she's doing.

Based on the player's approach to use of lethal force throughout the game, and certain choices made as Black (which are catalogued during Ramsey's audit), one of two endings occur. In the Good ending, Grace signs the contract, which will make her rich and still in control of the company, and fires Atkins, vowing to ensure the technology be used the way her father hoped it would be. In the Bad ending, Grace refuses to sign and destroys the Pandora prototype, ensuring the technology will never be used again.

== Other media ==
On 16 November 2018, Cole Black appeared in Blue Sunset Games' fighting platform game Go All Out, where he is a playable fighter; he is also the first AAA game character to be in the game.

== Reception ==
Reception

Aggregate score
Aggregator	Score
Metacritic	PC: 75/100; PS4: 71/100; XONE: 73/100

Review scores
Publication	Score
Destructoid	8/10
Electronic Gaming Monthly	7.5/10
Game Informer	8.25/10
GameSpot	7/10
PC Gamer (US)	66/100
VideoGamer.com	7/10

Get Even received "generally favorable" reviews for the Windows version but "mixed or average" reviews for the PlayStation 4 and Xbox One versions, according to review aggregator Metacritic.

8/10 was Brett Makedonski's score on Destructoid with the consensus: "Impressive effort with a few noticeable problems holding it back. Won't astound everyone, but is worth your time and cash."

Michael Goroff's 7.5/10 score on Electronic Gaming Monthly stated that "Get Even is better as an experience than as a game, but it's an extremely evocative experience. Even still, what could have been a completely unique gaming experience is hampered by its desire to be a more action-oriented, generic thriller."

Andy Kelly's score of 66/100 on PC Gamer called the game "A messy, unfocused mishmash of genres with a few smart ideas."

Alice Bell said on VideoGamer.com that "Get Even's use of layered sound and even more layered story is unsettling and great, but other awkward mechanics make this psychological thriller a bit less than the sum of some very fine parts." and awarded it a score of 7/10.

The game was nominated for "Music Design" and "Best Writing" at the 2017 Develop Awards, and for "Music" at the 14th British Academy Games Awards.
