= GreedFall: The Dying World =

2026 video game

- Developer: Spiders
- Publisher: Nacon
- Artist: Cyril Tahmassebi
- Writer: Jehanne Rousseau
- Composer: Olivier Derivière
- Platforms: PlayStation 5; Windows; Xbox Series X/S
- Release: 10 March 2026
- Genre: Action role-playing
- Mode: Single-player

GreedFall: The Dying World is a 2026 action role-playing video game developed by Spiders and published by Nacon. A prequel to GreedFall (2019), the game was released via early access in September 2024, with the full release following in March 2026 for PlayStation 5, Windows and Xbox Series X/S.

== Gameplay ==
GreedFall: The Dying World is an action role-playing video game played from a third-person perspective. The player assumes control of a member of an indigenous tribe on the island of Teer Fradee, who is abducted by forces of the mainland who seek to colonize the island. The game is set in the continent of Gacane, an open world which can be freely explored. The game features a character creator, allowing players to customize the appearance of their player avatar. Players can use a variety of ways to approach their objectives: they can engage with direct combat with their enemies, sneak past them using stealth tactics, or negotiate with other non-playable characters using the player character's skills in diplomacy. The game's combat gives the player three modes: Tactical – where the player controls their entire team, Hybrid – which automates a few of the player's team's moves, and Focused – that has the player fully concentrating on the protagonist. Different characters have distinct skills. Some are more skilled in melee combat, while some are more observant, allowing them to discern traps from a distance.

== Development ==
GreedFall: The Dying World was developed by Spiders by a team of less than 100 people. As the original game was a commercial success for the studio, Spiders listened to player's feedback and incorporated changes such as deepening the lore of the game, and introducing an explorable setting that was only hinted at in the first game. The Dying World flips the narrative of the first game and its story sees an islander venturing into the mainland. Jehanne Rousseau, lead writer of the game, described the setting as a fantasy world that was also "based on history". She added that The Dying World tells "a story about political schemes and murders", and that the world was "more dirty than heroic". According to art director Cyril Tahmassebi, the team also wanted to improve the "Rembrandt-inspired art design and golden century feel" of the first game, and the expanded setting allowed the team to create more factions and locations.

The team also completely revamped the combat system in an effort to make party members more involved. As opposed to the first game in which companions are controlled by artificial intelligence, players can directly issue commands to companions in The Dying World so that players can feel like they were controlling a team of characters. The game was heavily inspired by BioWare's Dragon Age: Origins and Star Wars: Knights of the Old Republic, and the team spent an extensive amount of time developing the game's companion characters.

Publisher Nacon and Spiders announced the game in May 2022. The early access version of the game, which includes the first chapter of the game, was released for Windows on 24 September 2024. The full version of the game, as well as versions for PlayStation 5 and Xbox Series X/S, was released on 10 March 2026. This would be Spiders' last game to be released. In April 2026, it was reported that Nacon had attempted to sell the studio but had failed to find a buyer. As a result, the studio was shut down after 18 years of operation.

== Reception ==
Reception

Aggregate scores
Aggregator	Score
Metacritic	(PC) 63/100 (PS5) 65/100 (XSXS) 68/100
OpenCritic	19% recommend

Initial responses to the game's early access launch were mixed.

GreedFall: The Dying World received "mixed or average" reviews, according to review aggregator website Metacritic. Fellow review aggregator OpenCritic assessed that the game received fair approval, being recommended by 19% of critics.
