= My Little Flufties =

2006 video game

- Developer: DK Games
- Publisher: Lexicon Entertainment
- Designer: Christophe Kohler
- Programmer: Eric Meldonian
- Composers: Olivier Deriviere (Music); Sylvain Prunier (Sound)
- Engine: Game Incubator PC
- Platforms: Nintendo DS, Windows
- Release: Windows: EU: October 13, 2006; Nintendo DS: EU: September 7, 2007; US: July 14, 2007
- Genre: Simulation
- Mode: Single-player

My Little Flufties, known as AniMates in North America, is a 3D virtual pet published for the Nintendo DS and Windows by Lexicon Entertainment. The game is distributed by JoWood Productions in Europe and Dreamcatcher in North America.

== Gameplay ==
Aimed at children aged 5–9, players can choose between 5 imaginary creatures. Players must feed, wash, educate, and entertain the creatures to keep the game going.

The fairy-like 3D world contains several attractions, such as swings and slides. There are also 5 mini-games available:

- Mole-o-matic: Jump on the head of the moles to stun them.
- Shoot the balloons: Shoot with a peashooter to pop coloured balloons.
- Fish-o-matic: Catch fish with a fishing net.
- Hopscotch: Jump on the good squares to advance.
- Find the Tweet-Tweet: Find 4 birds hidden in the game's world.

The game uses a full 3D engine with a traditional drawing style.

My Little Flufties was also distributed by Oberon Media on digital storefronts.
