= PhyreEngine =

Multiplatform game engine

- Developer: Sony Interactive Entertainment
- Operating system: PlayStation 4, PlayStation 3, PlayStation VR, PlayStation Vita, PlayStation Portable, Nintendo Switch, Microsoft Windows, Android, iOS, Xbox One
- Type: Game engine
- License: Proprietary
- Website: develop.scee.net/research-technology/phyreengine/

PhyreEngine is a license-only free to use game engine from Sony Interactive Entertainment, compatible with PlayStation 4, PlayStation 3, PlayStation VR, PlayStation Vita, PlayStation Portable, Nintendo Switch, Microsoft Windows (for OpenGL and DirectX 11), Google Android and Apple iOS. PhyreEngine has been adopted by several game studios and has been used in over 200 published titles.

== Features ==
PhyreEngine is exclusively distributed to Sony licensees as an installable package that includes both full source code and Microsoft Windows tools, provided under its own flexible use license that allows any PlayStation 3 game developer, publisher or tools and middleware company to create software based partly or fully on PhyreEngine on any platform. The engine uses sophisticated parallel processing techniques that are optimized for the Synergistic Processor Unit (SPU) of the Cell Broadband Engine of PS3, but can be easily ported to other multi-core architectures.

PhyreEngine supports OpenGL and Direct3D, in addition to the low level PS3 LibGCM library. It provides fully functional "game templates" as source code, including support for Havok Complete XS, NVIDIA PhysX and Bullet for physics.

== History ==
The development of PhyreEngine was started in 2003 to create a graphics engine for PlayStation 3. The first public demonstration occurred in 2006.

PhyreEngine was launched during the 2008 Game Developers Conference. New features (including deferred rendering) were showcased during GDC 2009. Version 2.40, released in March 2009, included a new "foliage rendering" system that provides tools and technology to render ultra-realistic trees and plants to be easily integrated into games.

Version 3.0, released in 2011, has a new and powerful asset pipeline, combining enhanced versions of the already robust exporters, with a powerful processing tool to generate optimized assets for each platform. Also new is the rewritten level editor, which permits a far more data-driven approach to authoring games using PhyreEngine. Version 3.0 added support for the PlayStation Vita.

List of games using PhyreEngine
Title	Developer	Year
Akiba's Trip: Undead & Undressed	Acquire	2013
Malicious	Alvion	2010
Rugby League Live	Big Ant Studios	2010
AFL Live	Big Ant Studios	2011
AFL Live: Game of the Year Edition	Big Ant Studios	2012
Critter Crunch	Capybara Games	2009
Below	Capybara Games	2018
Colin McRae: Dirt (Note: Uses the derivative EGO game engine)	Codemasters	2007
Race Driver: Grid	Codemasters	2008
Unravel	Coldwood Interactive, Electronic Arts	2016
Unravel Two	Coldwood Interactive, Electronic Arts	2018
Hyperdimension Neptunia	Compile Heart, Idea Factory, Gust Corporation, Nippon Ichi Software, Sega	2010
Hyperdimension Neptunia mk2	Compile Heart, Idea Factory	2011
Hyperdimension Neptunia Victory	Compile Heart, Idea Factory	2012
Megadimension Neptunia VII	Compile Heart, Idea Factory	2015
Mugen Souls	Compile Heart, Idea Factory, Nippon Ichi Software	2012
Mugen Souls Z	Compile Heart, Idea Factory, Nippon Ichi Software	2013
Hotline Miami	Dennaton Games, Abstraction Games	2012
Burn Zombie Burn	Doublesix Games	2009
The Legend of Heroes: Trails of Cold Steel	Falcom	2013
The Legend of Heroes: Trails of Cold Steel II	Falcom	2014
Tokyo Xanadu	Falcom	2015
The Legend of Heroes: Trails of Cold Steel III	Falcom	2017
The Legend of Heroes: Trails of Cold Steel IV	Falcom	2018
The Legend of Heroes: Trails into Reverie	Falcom	2020
Savage Moon	FluffyLogic	2008
Catan	Game Republic	2008
Knytt Underground	Green Hill Studios	2012
Atelier Rorona: The Alchemist of Arland	Gust Corporation	2009
Ar tonelico Qoga: Knell of Ar Ciel	Gust Corporation	2010
Atelier Totori: The Adventurer of Arland	Gust Corporation	2010
Atelier Meruru: The Apprentice of Arland	Gust Corporation	2011
Atelier Ayesha: The Alchemist of Dusk	Gust Corporation	2012
Divekick	Iron Galaxy Studios	2013
PachiPara DL Hyper Sea Story In Karibu	Irem	2008
Zettai Zetsumei Toshi 4: Summer Memories	Irem	2011
Strength of the Sword 3	Ivent	2013
Super Mega Baseball	Metalhead Software	2014
Trinity Universe	Nippon Ichi Software	2009
Last Rebellion	Nippon Ichi Software	2010
Disgaea 4	Nippon Ichi Software	2011
The Witch and the Hundred Knight	Nippon Ichi Software	2013
Rocketbirds: Hardboiled Chicken	Ratloop	2011
Rocketbirds 2: Evolution	Ratloop	2016
OlliOlli2: Welcome to Olliwood	Roll7	2015
Gravity Rush	Japan Studio	2011
Under Siege	Seed Studios	2011
GripShift	Sidhe Interactive	2007
Shatter	Sidhe Interactive	2009
Mars: War Logs	Spiders	2013
Bound by Flame	Spiders	2014
The Technomancer	Spiders	2016
Final Fantasy X/X-2 HD Remaster	Square Enix	2014
Final Fantasy XII Zodiac Age	Square Enix	2016
Dragon Quest Builders	Square Enix	2016
Flower	thatgamecompany	2009
Flow	thatgamecompany	2007
Journey	thatgamecompany	2012
Amy	VectorCell	2012
Flashback	VectorCell	2013
ibb & obb	Sparpweed & Codeglue	2013
Super Motherload	XGen Studios	2013

== Derived game engines ==
- EGO
- Silk Engine
