= Rocketbirds: Hardboiled Chicken =

2011 video game

- Steam banner
- Developer: Ratloop
- Publishers: Ratloop; Reverb Publishing
- Director: Sian Yue Tan
- Producer: Ralph Egas
- Designers: Sian Yue Tan; James Anderson; Lucas Pope; Keiko Pope
- Programmers: Lucas Pope; Keiko Pope
- Artists: Sian Yue Tan; Xinru Zou; Tze Yi Ang
- Composer: Herwig Maurer
- Series: Rocketbirds
- Engine: PhyreEngine
- Platforms: Microsoft Windows, OS X, Linux, PlayStation 3, PlayStation 4, PlayStation Vita
- Release: PlayStation 3: NA: October 18, 2011; PAL: October 19, 2011; Windows; October 15, 2012; PlayStation Vita: NA: February 12, 2013; PAL: February 13, 2013; OS X, Linux; September 20, 2013; PlayStation 4: NA: November 15, 2020; PAL: November 16, 2020
- Genre: Platform game
- Modes: Single-player, multiplayer

Rocketbirds: Hardboiled Chicken is a platform adventure game created and developed by Ratloop for Microsoft Windows, PlayStation 3, and PlayStation Vita. OS X and Linux ports were later released in September 2013 as part of Humble Bundle, followed by the PlayStation 4 version in November 2020. A remake of the 2009 Flash game Rocketbirds: Revolution!, Hardboiled Chicken is a cinematic adventure game with full single and co-op campaigns and stereoscopic 3D support.

== Gameplay ==
Rocketbirds: Hardboiled Chicken is an adventure platform game in which the player controls Hardboiled Chicken. The player unlocks many different weapons throughout the campaign, with which they have to dispatch enemies of different ranks. The game balances brutal shootouts and puzzling elements, keeping the player alert. In the co-op campaign, two players can complete the missions together. The maps are the same as in the regular campaign, except the puzzles have to be solved in different ways as the characters are smaller and both players have to help each other to be able to progress.

== Plot ==
Rocketbirds' single player campaign opens with Hardboiled Chicken fighting a barrage of Penguin army soldiers. His mission is to find and kill the corrupt Penguin dictator, iL Putzki, in order to set the citizens of Albatropolis free. Hardboiled's jetpack runs low on fuel during his flight, dropping him into the woods where a nearby building is being guarded by penguins. Elsewhere, Putzki himself finds out about Hardboiled's whereabouts, going into a panic until Brno Albatross, Putzki's bodyguard, ensures him that Hardboiled is only a one-man army fighting against millions. Hardboiled soon enters the building, later getting himself trapped in a cell where he is then tortured by Brno. It is then revealed through a series of flashbacks that Hardboiled, alongside various others, had been initially captured at a young age and forced to serve for the Penguin army, after a failed attempt to cook him at birth led to him still being alive years later. The army's black star symbol was imprinted onto his head during training, where he was made to obey the dictatorial rules set by the Penguins. Hardboiled's reasoning for rebelling is implied in the third of these flashbacks, where during his time serving under Putzki, an adult Hardboiled spotted a younger chicken from Albatropolis who looked very similar to himself when he was young. This caused him to regain some sense of humanity and immediately turn against his own fleet, first by attacking one of his former colleagues after seeing the child being threatened with death if Hardboiled did not follow orders. Having been rescued afterwards, the young chicken gave Hardboiled a grey bandana to cover the black star on his forehead.

After the torture flashback, Hardboiled wakes up in another cell with a cardinal standing next to him. He is then provided with a box of brain bugs to trick the prison guards into letting both them and the other captives free. On his way out of the facility, Hardboiled encounters Brno fleeing with Putzki to go on a rocket ship departing into space. Hardboiled eventually reaches the rocket with his jetpack, provided by a cardinal finding it and giving it to him on his way out, where he is soon ambushed by Brno from behind a nearby door. Hardboiled eventually kills Brno, and he soon gives chase to Putzki on a series of elevators. At the end of the game, Hardboiled corners and possesses Putzki with a brain bug and forces him to walk into the vacuum of space without a suit, causing his head to explode and ultimately killing Putzki. The final cutscene reveals three Cosmic Owls finding Putzki's fez in space and Brno's corpse in the rocket where Hardboiled fought him in, setting up events for the sequel.

In the co-op campaign, the main mission is to rescue the general's daughter (later named Pinky in Rocketbirds 2) and bring her back alive from the hands of the G-Men, who are geese that look similar to Brno. Every time she's found however, she runs off elsewhere and leaves the player characters confused. This persists until the final stage in the campaign, where the now annoyed Budgie Commandos wrap her near the end of their escape rope as they head back into the rescue helicopter, flying her back home with them.

== Development ==
In 2000, Sian Yue Tan and James Anderson made the Flash animation Albatropolis: 'Pilot'. A parody of an 80s trend started by Teenage Mutant Ninja Turtles, the video featured chickens and penguins violently fighting against each other in a snowy field. The concept stuck around with Sian Yue for a while until he formed Ratloop Asia the same year, using the characters as a way of practicing game development. Nine years later, Rocketbirds: Revolution! was launched online in 2009 as a browser-based game, with a free playable demo for the first chapter and the remaining ten being paid for as long as the player had an account. This early version was later nominated for three awards in the 2010 Independent Games Festival for Excellence in Audio, Excellence in Visual Art and the Seumas McNally Grand Prize, losing out only to Closure, Limbo and Monaco in each category respectively.

Ratloop would eventually make a deal with Sony Computer Entertainment to have the game be an exclusive for the PlayStation 3 and PlayStation Vita, with PC ports releasing two years afterwards. These versions added the co-op story mode, jetpack stages, more cutscenes and miscellaneous visual improvements to the initial Flash version. The Vita version in particular featured different stage layouts and added short tutorial cutscenes, along with a teaser for the then-in-development Rocketbirds 2 that showcased early concept art. Some of these included concepts of tanks and Hardboiled riding a motorcycle, both of which never got implemented into the released game.

== Reception ==
Reception

Aggregate score
Aggregator	Score
Metacritic	(Vita) 76/100 (PC, PS3) 74/100

Review scores
Publication	Score
Destructoid	(PS3) 8.5/10
Edge	(Vita) 7/10
GamePro	(PS3) 4.5/5
GameSpot	(PS3) 6/10
Gamezebo	(PC) 4.5/5
GameZone	(PS3) 7/10
IGN	(PS3) 7.5/10
Pocket Gamer	(Vita) 4/5
PlayStation: The Official Magazine	(PS3) 8/10
Push Square	8/10
411Mania	(Vita) 7.5/10
The Digital Fix	(PS3) 6/10 (Vita) 5/10

The PlayStation Vita version received "generally favorable reviews", while the PC and PlayStation 3 versions received "mixed or average reviews", according to the review aggregation website Metacritic.

== Sequel ==
A sequel titled Rocketbirds 2: Evolution was released in 2016. The game featured various changes in controls and graphics to allow for a faster-paced experience. Hardboiled and the other playable characters can now double jump, aim in various directions, and use melee combat. The cooperative Rescue mode, released as free DLC, also gave players the opportunity to play as Hardboiled alongside the Budgie Commandos after unlocking him in the story campaign.
