= The Farm 51 =

Polish video game developer

- Industry: Video games
- Founded: 2005
- Headquarters: Gliwice, Poland
- Key people: Wojciech Pazdur; Kamil Bilczyński; Robert Siejka
- Products: Get Even; Chernobylite
- Number of employees: +100 (2018)
- Website: thefarm51.com

The Farm 51 is a Polish video game developer founded in 2005. It was most known for creating video games such as Get Even and Chernobylite.

== History ==
The studio was founded by Wojciech Pazdur and Kamil Bilczyński, which previously worked on the Painkiller series at People Can Fly, and Robert Siejka, former president of 3D Magazine. Originally, the company made some outsourcing contracts work for other studios, but then gathered enough IP to get funding from 1C Company for its 2009 debut project, NecroVisioN, and then its prequel, NecroVisioN: Lost Company. They were initially working on City Interactive's Alien Fear, but are no longer involved with the project. They released Deadfall Adventures in November 2013. Get Even was published by Bandai Namco Entertainment and released in June 2017. They released Chernobylite in July 2021 (on PC and later on consoles). Their upcoming game, World War 3 is in development with publishers My.Games and The 4 Winds Entertainment.

== Games developed ==
Year	Title	Platform(s)								
Year	Title	NDS	PS3	Win	X360	Lin	XOne	PS4	XSXS	PS5
2007	Time Ace	Yes	No	No	No	No	No	No	No	No
2009	NecroVisioN	No	No	Yes	No	No	No	No	No	No
2010	NecroVisioN: Lost Company	No	No	Yes	No	No	No	No	No	No
2012	Painkiller: Hell & Damnation	No	Yes	Yes	Yes	Yes	No	No	No	No
2013	Deadfall Adventures	No	Yes	Yes	Yes	Yes	No	No	No	No
2017	Get Even	No	No	Yes	No	No	Yes	Yes	No	No
2021	Chernobylite	No	No	Yes	No	No	Yes	Yes	Yes	Yes
2022	World War 3	No	No	Yes	No	No	No	No	No	No
TBA	Chernobylite 2: Exclusion Zone	No	No	Yes	No	No	No	No	No	No

=== Outsourced projects ===
- The Witcher (2007)
- Two Worlds II (2010)

== See also ==
- Hatred
- 1C Company
