= Under Siege (2011 video game) =

2011 video game

- Game cover
- Developer: Seed Studios
- Publisher: Sony Computer Entertainment
- Engine: PhyreEngine
- Platform: PlayStation 3
- Release: 2 June 2011
- Genre: Real-time tactics
- Modes: Single-player, multiplayer

Under Siege is a 2011 real-time tactics video game developed by Portuguese company Seed Studios and published by Sony Computer Entertainment for the PlayStation 3. It features a single player campaign, and multiplayer via online and co-op. It contains a level editor which allows users to make and share maps. The game is set in a medieval fantasy world and follows the story of Eirik, Kari and Asgeir. It is compatible with the PlayStation Move controller.

On 23 August 2011, the game was released into the Asian market including Singapore, Thailand, Taiwan, Hong Kong, Malaysia, South Korea and Indonesia.

== Gameplay ==
Under Siege places emphasis on user-generated content and in-game battles, according to the official website, and it is tailored for console gameplay and controls. The gameplay is battle orientated and not focused on resource farming. The player's army build experience by fighting battles and each army can consist of multiple races. Under Siege features multiplayer gaming with online matches for up to 2 players online and split screen matches for up to two players. The game allows Deathmatch, Capture Point, Capture Treasure, and Survival multiplayer game modes.

== Comic book ==
Prior to the game's release, a comic book titled Under Siege: First Encounter was released to set the scene.

== Reception ==
Reception

Aggregate score
| Aggregator | Score |
|---|---|
| Metacritic | 69/100 |

Review scores
| Publication | Score |
|---|---|
| Edge | 7/10 |
| GameSpot | 7/10 |
| IGN | 5/10 |

The game achieved an aggregate rating of 69% on video game review site Metacritic, indicating "mixed or average" reviews that were representative of good value for money with good production values but significantly hampered in general appeal by difficulty spikes, and a high overall difficulty level.

Edge gave the title a 7 out of 10, writing, "Under Siege may be a downloadable game, but it's certainly not throwaway. It's engaging and, if the controls can be mastered and the bugs forgiven, a satisfying sampler of RTS thrills for the uninitiated, and a stamina test for anyone who thinks they're hard enough."

Digitally Downloaded gave the game 4 stars out of 5 and stated, "There is some fine tuning that the game could have used, however. Difficulty is spotty at best – even on the easiest levels it's all too easy to accidentally wander into a massive enemy swarm because the fog of war is, frankly, too close to your units. And although the best effort has been done to get the controls down, it'll never manage to be as intuitive as mouse and keyboard for the strategy genre. But it's an impressive effort nonetheless, and a warm welcome back for the PSN. Given that everyone gets free PlayStation Plus subscriptions, take advantage of the fact this game is heavily discounted; it's well worth the budget asking price."

Eurogamer gave it a 7/10, concluding that it was "A game that requires a degree of patience and tolerance before it truly clicks. If you have the required resolve, there's plenty to admire."

IGN however gave it a 5/10 and was more critical of its "over-the-top" difficulty.

== Awards ==
Under Siege has won the Grand Prize for the "Zon Multimedia Awards 2010" held in January 2011 at the "Museu do Oriente" in Lisbon, Portugal. It also won 1st prize for "Applications and Multimedia Contents".
