= NecroVisioN =

2009 video game

- European cover art
- Developer: The Farm 51
- Publishers: RU: 1C Company; EU: 505 Games; NA: Aspyr Media (Note: Steam version published by 1C Company.)
- Platform: Microsoft Windows
- Release: RU: February 20, 2009; EU: February 27, 2009; NA: May 26, 2009
- Genre: First-person shooter
- Modes: Single-player, multiplayer

NecroVisioN is a World War I alternate history horror first-person shooter developed by Polish developer The Farm 51 and published by 505 Games. It was released for Microsoft Windows in February 2009. The game was published by Aspyr Media in the United States, on May 26, 2009, and Canada on August 10, 2009. A prequel entitled NecroVisioN: Lost Company was released in February 2010.

== Synopsis ==
=== Setting ===
NecroVisioN is set in 1916 during World War I. The player takes the role of Simon Bukner, a young American soldier recently recruited into the British Army. In addition to German soldiers, Simon soon finds himself fighting supernatural forces, including vampires, demons, and zombies found in locations varying from the battlefields of World War I to secret laboratories and caverns. The main setting is the Battle of the Somme, during which a rumor of a mysterious infection has appeared, which causes all people to turn into zombie-like state. Later, the game takes the player into two new settings; the underground realm of Vampires, and the demonic realm, Hell.

=== Plot ===
The game begins with the protagonist Simon Bukner being awakened by a British soldier within a bunker. It is apparently time for a counterattack against German lines. After a rallying speech by the commanding officer, Simon is to follow his squad of soldiers towards the assault point. But as soon as they arrive, they are ambushed by heavy German machine gun fire and mustard gas. Many of the soldiers die and Simon is seen running aimlessly, searching for cover from both bullets and gas. Soon, Simon collapses.

When Simon reawakens, he is in another bunker with several corpses and a surviving British soldier. The soldier claims he has barricaded the bunker from the inside to prevent anything from coming in. That includes members of Simon's squad escaping the gas. Simon is visibly upset and angry at the soldier's cowardice. The soldier continues rambling due to battlefield stress about having German passwords and other intel, including some on patrol routes. Thus he plans to evade and escape the trenches with the information he has. Simon then threatens him and soon, a fight ensues. Simon kills him and takes his rifle. Simon is disturbed by the fact that he has to kill a friendly soldier. By blowing up the barricade, Simon fights his way through the trenches and meets several soldiers who Simon initially believes are in a bad mental state (shell shock) because of the horrors they have seen. However, soon the zombies, hell hounds, and other netherworld creatures begin to manifest.

Nearing a trench, a demonic looking face manifests itself and starts rambling about a savior, and that Simon can be that savior. This is one of the last vampires, a mystic race that stood against demons. Simon begins to wonder what is going on here and suspects that there is something much more sinister happening at the trenches. Along the way, Simon begins to unravel and discover bits and pieces of information about what is going on. This leads him to Jonas Zimmerman, the person behind the monstrosity that has been going on. Eventually, the player travels through trenches, old ruins (where he first encounters Zimmerman, but is tricked) and finally the stronghold where Zimmerman was last located. At the basement lab of the stronghold, the player discovers a mechanical walking tank created by the Vampires. Using it, Simon proceeds to a showdown with Zimmerman who commandeers a Scorpion-shaped walking tank ten times the size of Simon's tank.

After getting rid of Zimmerman, Simon is chosen as the owner of the new Shadow Hand with Menthor inside - the spirit of an old Vampiric champion, bound within the glove. This glove was the source of Zimmerman's power over the undead, and now it is to be used against the demons deep underground. Menthor will act as the companion of the player, guides him all the way, and provides instructions about the spell system in the game. The goal of the game from now on is to conquer the great demon - Mephisto. Simon descends deep into steampunk-styled underground Vampire realm, which has been corrupted by demons.

After a long journey, Simon mounts an ancient dragon and makes his way to Hell itself, where he battles Mephisto's second-in-command, the fallen angel Azazel (who rides three-headed Cerberus). Later, Simon encounters Mephisto himself, and clashes with him in final battle. The game has three endings, which are chosen based on the difficulty level:

- EASY: Simon wakes up in the Somme trenches directly when the war ends in 1918 with the attack by Mephisto's forces having never taken place. He is taken back to Allied lines by a German soldier, where medics tell him he contracted shell shock resulting in him being unable to remember the last two years. They also discover strange multiple scars on his arms whose origins they cannot explain.
- NORMAL: Unable to escape from Hell, Simon makes a deal with Mephisto giving the human and vampire races 100 years of peace before his next attempted invasion of Earth. In return, Simon becomes General of the Army of Hell and wonders if humanity and the vampires will be ready for the next demonic invasion.
- HARD: Mephisto dies and Simon becomes the new King of Hell who starts preparing to lead another attack on the humans and vampires.

== Gameplay ==
NecroVisioN is a first-person shooter which also has a close-combat system and an ability to use both arms with different weapons. The health system is based on limited regeneration, with an ability to use a health pack or a red shard to restore it. Slain enemies may drop health or mana, which is used for spells. The gameplay is varied, and includes combo system, challenge mode, and storyline sections where player pilots a Vampire-made robotic exosuit and rides a dragon.

=== Multiplayer ===
There are no demonic spells, weapons or powers. The player can choose either to be a Human, Undead or a Vampire. The modes are Free for All, in which players fight each other in a classic deathmatch mode; Capture the Artifact in which teams attempt to capture a vampiric artifact and bring it to their base; Team Deathmatch in which players are grouped into teams to fight each other in a classic deathmatch mode; and Last Man Standing in which players start the game with additional health and fight each other. The last player left alive wins the match.

== Soundtrack ==
Preliator by Globus was featured as the final boss music. Orchard of Mines by Globus was featured as the ending credits song in the game.

== Reception ==
Reception

Aggregate scores
Aggregator	Score
GameRankings	65.92%
Metacritic	63/100

Review scores
Publication	Score
GameSpot	7.0/10
GamesRadar+	3/5
IGN	6.9/10
Best Gamer	82/100
Game Grin	6.5/10
PC World	60/100
Resolution Magazine	60/100
VicioJuegos	65/100
Videogamer	7/10

NecrovisioN received average to mixed reviews. Where IGN award with 6.9/10 while GameSpot rated it with 7/10. Martyn Clayden of IT Reviews had said that the game is a mix of H. P. Lovecraft and Medal of Honor set in World War I.

== Prequel ==
NecroVisioN: Lost Company is a prequel to the story of the first game. It features Jonas Zimmerman as the protagonist, and shows him fighting against demonic invaders during the war, slowly discovering the vampire tech. He eventually fights against a powerful golem, who guarded the Shadow Hand, but is corrupted by the demonic powers.
