= Bound by Flame =

2014 action role-playing video game

- Developer: Spiders
- Publisher: Focus Home Interactive
- Producer: Walid Miled
- Composer: Olivier Deriviere
- Engine: PhyreEngine
- Platforms: PlayStation 3 PlayStation 4 Xbox 360; Microsoft Windows; Linux
- Release: PlayStation 3, PlayStation 4: NA: 6 May 2014; PAL: 7 May 2014; Windows, Xbox 360: WW: 9 May 2014; Linux: WW: 3 December 2015
- Genre: Action role-playing
- Mode: Single-player

Bound by Flame is a 2014 action role-playing game developed by Spiders and published by Focus Home Interactive. Bound by Flame puts the player in the role of a victim of demonic possession who must choose between the evil powers that are offered or rejecting them in favor of developing heroic talents.

== Gameplay ==
Bound by Flame lets the players customize their character. During the creation of their hero, players will be able choose their gender and then choose from three pre-made models.

Through its different chapters, Bound by Flame follows a main quest with optional side quests. Several companions will join the player during their quest, and will, depending on the player's actions, develop friendship, romance, or rivalry. Depending on the choices made by the player and the influence of the demon, some chapters will offer different scenarios and a different experience.

Bound by Flame includes a crafting system, allowing players to create and improve equipment, including their armor and weapons. Using the crafting system, the player can customize weapons and armour with more depth than most other games.

The player can choose between three different skill trees that affect combat abilities; Ranger, Pyromancer, and Warrior. The Warrior skill tree relies on slow, heavy, strikes with large weapons, and a push/kick ability to interrupt enemies or break their defences. The Ranger skill tree uses small weapons like daggers for quick strikes and gives a dodge ability to evade enemy attacks. The Pyromancer skill tree utilizes high damage fire attacks which can be combined with the Ranger and Warrior skill trees to do things like enhance weapons with fire damage.

During combat, the player can use other attacks aside from striking with a weapon, like traps and abilities earned from the skill trees.

== Plot ==
The story takes place in the fictional land of Vertiel during a war between the Elves and Red Scribes against an assembly of immortal necromancers known as the Ice Lords and their undead empire, the Frozen Shadows. The player character is an unnamed mercenary known only by their pseudonym; Vulcan. They are a demolition specialist in service to the illustrious sellsword company, the Freeborn Blades. Vulcan is a mysterious person whose past is largely forgotten by them. The Freeborn Blades are under the employment of the Red Scribes in their attempt to hold back the army of undead in service to the Ice Lords. During a mysterious ritual conducted by the Red Scribes, something goes wrong and Vulcan is possessed by a fiery demon. Vulcan is endowed with inhuman powers of strength and magical abilities of pyromancy, which they then use to overpower and defeat an undead Juggernaut beast.

The unnamed Demon speaks to Vulcan in their subconscious, scolding them for their weakness and cowardice and blaming the Demon's situation on Vulcan. The Demon demands that Vulcan liberate the Worldheart, the literal heart that sustains the world, from the Ice Lords so that he may return there.

A victim of a demonic influence will have to choose between the evil powers offered or reject them in favor of developing heroic talents. Dangers and enemies will become more fearsome in battle throughout, increasing the temptations to acquire more power by giving up part of the hero's soul to the demon. Progression of the demonic influence is reflected visually by the transformation of the hero's body into a demon. After overcoming their enemies and recruiting various allies throughout their journey, Vulcan assaults an Ice Lord palace where they confront and defeat the game's antagonist, Lord Blackfrost, and then ventures off to free the Worldheart from the Ice Lords' control.

The game features three endings for the player to choose from, a neutral ending, an 'evil' ending, and a 'good ending', depending on whether the player resisted or succumbed to the demon's influence. If the player has given in to the demon's influence they will be able to become a full demon and destroy the world of Vertiel. If the player has resisted the demon's influence, they will be able to choose to reject the demon's powers and commit suicide to save the world of Vertiel. Regardless of the level of demon influence on the character, the player will always be able to choose to subdue the demon and become the ruler of Vertiel.

== Development ==
Jehanne Rousseau, CEO of Spiders, said "Bound by Flame is like Mars on the game-play aspect, but of course the universe is completely different. We really tried to listen to all the critics we had from the players, from the press, and we tried to work differently on some aspects that were very poor in Mars. Now we have more of a budget and more time to develop it, so we tried to improve all the things we can." The game was not released on the Xbox One due to the team not being given development kits for the console in time.

The game's soundtrack was composed by Olivier Deriviere. In an interview, Derivière stated, "I really wanted to capture a sense of loneliness and despair with the music so I created unique soundscapes to support the different locations and atmospheres." Derivière went on to talk about the possessed hero Vulcan and that he "thought it would be very interesting to have a contrast between the dead and the living." In the same interview, singer Iré Zhekova who lent her voice to some of the game's music tracks says she "used an imaginary language because she wanted to explore the human voice and express the emotion beyond the words."

== Reception ==
Reception

Aggregate scores
Aggregator	Score
GameRankings	(PC) 55.12% (PS4) 57.54%
Metacritic	(PC) 56/100 (X360) 56/100 (PS4) 53/100

Review scores
Publication	Score
Destructoid	7.0/10
Game Informer	8/10
GameSpot	4/10
GamesRadar+	3.5/5
IGN	7/10
PC Gamer (US)	54/100
Polygon	4/10
Hardcore Gamer	2/5

Bound by Flame received mixed reviews. It was criticized for its lack of deeper character development, relationship building with party members, poor AI system, short length, and poor combat that gives the game an unnecessary difficulty. Excessive and inappropriate swearing and profanity to give the game an artificial edge as well as out of place jokes and misplaced dialogue and information have also been cited. Kevin VanOrd of GameSpot stated that there are several questionable design choices such as when "you're asked to enter a name for your character—a name that is then summarily ignored by the game's supporting cast... This identity crisis may seem a minor detail, but it is a head-scratcher of an issue in a role-playing game full of head-scratchers, each one more stymieing than the last." Adam Beck of Hardcore Gamer had similar sentiment as other reviewers, opining "Bound by Flame is a charming RPG that's fundamentally and mechanically flawed."

On the other hand, Brittany Vincent of Destructoid wrote, "It's rough around the edges; a discount Witcher, by many counts, but it also possesses a certain degree of playability that I find devoid in other, more polished outings. And for that reason, despite its many confusing design decisions and mechanics, I commend developer Spiders on a job medium well." Others have praised the demon power's trade-off, crafting system, beautiful soundtrack, and that your choices and interactions factor heavily into how events play out and people react to you. Daniel Tack of Game Informer stated, "A skilled player doing no sidequests and blowing through dialogue can complete the game in about 10-12 hours, but this is sacrificing a ton of content both in the quest, exploration, and relationship-building categories... Bound by Flame is a solid romp and has plenty of ways to see your choices reflected in the world around you." Courtney Osborn of IGN echoed this writing, "Bound by Flame is a breath of fresh air in an otherwise crowded genre. Spiders has achieved what many developers fail to ever do."
