= MIO: Memories in Orbit =

2026 video game

- Developer: Douze Dixièmes
- Publisher: Focus Entertainment
- Director: Oscar Blumberg
- Producers: Sarah Hourcade; George Herrmann
- Programmers: Quentin Ferragu; Sevan Kazandjian
- Artist: Etienne Thibault Buisson
- Writer: Tom Ariaudo
- Composer: Nicolas Gueguen
- Engine: Joran Bigalet
- Platforms: Nintendo Switch; Nintendo Switch 2; PlayStation 5; Windows; Xbox Series X/S
- Release: WW: 20 January 2026
- Genre: Metroidvania
- Mode: Single-player

MIO: Memories in Orbit is a Metroidvania platformer video game developed by Douze Dixièmes and published by Focus Entertainment. It was released on 20 January 2026 on Nintendo Switch, Nintendo Switch 2, PlayStation 5, Windows and Xbox Series X/S.

== Gameplay ==
MIO: Memories in Orbit is a 2.5D side-scrolling metroidvania. The player controls a robot named Mio, who explores The Vessel, a ship now inhabited by only robots. The player has a finite amount of hit points (called layers of protection, once all layers of protection are lost Mio becomes one hit away from dying) but more can be obtained throughout the game. Occasionally throughout the game, The Heart's tremors will cause the player to permanently lose a layer of protection. The player can learn new abilities such as climbing on walls, dodging attacks, grappling to enemies, and gliding through a centipede-like robot named Samsk who you will encounter in multiple locations across the game's runtime (usually following an important moment such as a boss fight.) The combat in the game has a strong focus on aerial combat as striking any enemy will recover your double-jump. Players can purchase and equip various modifiers reminiscent of Hollow Knight's charm system which grant various increases to aspects of certain abilities (e.g. you do more damage for every layer of protection lost). Each modifier has a cost (modifier slots) dependent on its quality with some modifiers being negative (e.g. removing all layers of protection) but giving you more modifier slots.

Upon death, all Nacre (the game's form of currency used to purchase modifiers and other upgrades) is lost and given to Shii, an NPC that, in the early-game, is the only way of checking the map. After enough Nacre is lost, Shii is able to grant you permanent access to a map wherever you are.

Fast travel is done through devices called overseers who also serve as save points and the place where your map gets updated. Upon death you return to the last overseer you rested by. In the early-game you only have access to one overseer which serves as the only respawn point. Once more of The Vessel gets explored and more overseers are found, they are still sparse and spread out.

== Plot ==
The game takes place aboard a spaceship known as "The Vessel" . Originally set out to guide humans, or "travelers", to a new planet, it became inhabited and run solely by robots following the death of the travelers. The voices, travelers whose minds are implanted into a pearl via a process called embedding, are growing weak due to decay on The Heart, a voice that gives life to the robot inhabitants. This causes the robots to temporarily disconnect from the system resulting in damage or death. Your journey takes you exploring The Vessel in attempt to claim the 5 other Voices to heal the heart and complete The Vessel's original mission.

== Development and release ==
MIO: Memories in Orbit is developed by Douze Dixièmes, an indie game development studio from France. The game was announced during a Nintendo Direct presentation in June 2024, with its original release window of 2025. In December 2025, it was delayed to 20 January 2026.

Douze Dizièmes announced on 23 June 2026 the developer would close down.

== Reception ==
Reception

Aggregate scores
Aggregator	Score
Metacritic	(NS2) 81/100 (PC) 83/100 (PS5) 83/100 (XSXS) 81/100
OpenCritic	83% recommend (Note: Based on 102 reviews)

Review scores
Publication	Score
Destructoid	9/10
Game Informer	8.75/10
Nintendo Life	8/10
Nintendo World Report	7.5/10
Shacknews	6/10

MIO: Memories in Orbit received "generally favorable" reviews, according to review aggregator website Metacritic. OpenCritic assessed that the game received strong approval, being recommended by 83% of critics.

Rachel Samples of Destructoid praised MIO's art style and exploration aspect, and mentioned that figuring out the story of the Vessel through environmental storytelling clues was one of the most enjoyable parts of the game. She also felt that movement and traversal felt very smooth, and that despite combat being rather simple at first, there was an element of skill to it, and most fights were generally well balanced.

Writing for Game Informer, Matt Miller also described the visual aesthetic and exploration as highlights, although he was more critical of the combat systems. He described progression as tedious and repetitive, especially in the early game.

Will Borger of Shacknews was more critical of MIO than Samples and Miller. He also felt that the environmental storytelling on board the Vessel was a highlight, praising the emotional connection to the characters. However, he directed significant criticism towards the implementation of the upgrade system, noting that there was little reason to experiment, and "you’ll probably find a build early and stick with it." He also felt that the combat system's three-hit combo was shallow and did not allow much room for mastery, and it did not make boss fights very enjoyable.

Reviewing the game for Nintendo World Report, Willem Hilhorst wrote that "while this game is jawdroppingly gorgeous, I found myself getting stuck on its pacing and hurdles more often than I would have liked". In his review for Nintendo Life, Ken Talbot deemed the game "a compelling adventure with solid platforming and combat", praising the art style and audio design while finding it "[o]verly familiar in both form and function".
