= Spiders (company) =

French video game developer

- Type: Subsidiary
- Industry: Video games
- Founded: 2008; 18 years ago
- Defunct: 29 April 2026; 2 months ago
- Headquarters: Paris, France
- Key people: Jehanne Rousseau; Wilfried Mallet; Walid Miled
- Parent: Nacon (2019–2026)
- Website: spiders-games.com

Spiders was a French video game developer specializing in action role-playing games.

== History ==
Spiders was created in 2008 by former Monte Cristo developers who had worked together the previous year on the game Silverfall. Wanting to stay together after the completion of this game, some developers team up to found Spiders. Jehanne Rousseau is the director.

In addition to its role as service provider to other developers, in particular by porting games to Xbox 360, the studio has specialized in a specific genre, namely role-playing games.

In July 2019, French publisher Bigben Interactive, now known as Nacon, announced that it had acquired Spiders. In July 2020, the studio revealed its next game, Steelrising, an action RPG set during the French Revolution. The game was later released in 2022.

In February 2026, Nacon filed for insolvency just weeks before Spiders launched the full release of GreedFall 2. By the following month, several subsidiaries, including Spiders, had also filed for insolvency. In April, it was reported that Nacon had attempted to sell the studio, but had failed to find a buyer. As a result, Spiders would be shut down after 18 years of operation. The developer confirmed the shutdown on 29 April.

== Game engine ==
All games were produced and developed using the company's own modified version of Sony's PhyreEngine, called the "Silk Engine". It includes most of the features of its parent engine, and is modified to add its own unique features.

== Games developed ==
| Year | Title | Platform(s) | Notes | Ref. |
|---|---|---|---|---|
| 2009 | Sherlock Holmes Versus Jack the Ripper | Xbox 360 | Port development | |
| 2010 | Faery: Legends of Avalon | Microsoft Windows, PlayStation 3, Xbox 360 | —N/a | |
| 2010 | Gray Matter | Xbox 360 | Port development | |
| 2012 | The Testament of Sherlock Holmes | PlayStation 3, Xbox 360 | Port development | |
| 2012 | Of Orcs and Men | Microsoft Windows, PlayStation 3, Xbox 360 | Co-developed with Cyanide | |
| 2013 | Mars: War Logs | Microsoft Windows, PlayStation 3, Xbox 360 | —N/a | |
| 2014 | Bound by Flame | Microsoft Windows, PlayStation 3, PlayStation 4, Xbox 360 | —N/a | |
| 2016 | The Technomancer | Microsoft Windows, PlayStation 4, Xbox One | —N/a | |
| 2019 | GreedFall | Microsoft Windows, PlayStation 4, PlayStation 5, Xbox One, Xbox Series X/S | —N/a | |
| 2022 | Steelrising | Microsoft Windows, PlayStation 5, Xbox Series X/S | —N/a | |
| 2026 | GreedFall: The Dying World | Microsoft Windows, PlayStation 5, Xbox Series X/S | —N/a | |
