= Chernobylite (video game) =

- Developer: The Farm 51
- Publisher: All in! Games SA
- Directors: Artur Fojcik; Wojciech Pazdur
- Composer: Mikolai Stroinski
- Engine: Unreal Engine 4
- Platforms: Microsoft Windows; Nintendo Switch; PlayStation 4; PlayStation 5; Xbox One; Xbox Series X/S
- Release: Microsoft Windows; 28 July 2021; PlayStation 4, Xbox One; 28 September 2021; PlayStation 5, Xbox Series X/S; 21 April 2022; Nintendo Switch; 13 December 2024
- Genres: First-person shooter, survival horror
- Mode: Single-player

Chernobylite is a 2021 first-person shooter survival horror video game developed by Polish game developer The Farm 51 and published by All in! Games. The game is set in the Chernobyl Exclusion Zone, where the player's objective is to explore, as Ukrainian physicist Igor Khymynuk, and find his fiancée in the radioactive wasteland. It was released for Windows in July 2021, PlayStation 4 and Xbox One in September 2021, PlayStation 5 and Xbox Series X/S in April 2022, and Nintendo Switch in December 2024. It received generally positive reviews from critics.

== Gameplay ==
Chernobylite is a survival game in which the player controls Igor Khymynuk, a former Chernobyl Nuclear Power Plant physicist who must explore the Chernobyl Exclusion Zone in search of his fiancée. Most of the single-player gameplay revolves around exploring the exclusion zone, gathering supplies and tools while encountering "Stalkers" and hostile military personnel. The player is also forced to make decisions which affect the nonlinear story line. There is also a crafting system, which allows the player to craft their own equipment and weapons. Any character can die and any task can be failed. Deep in the contaminated environment also lie strange supernatural threats, due to the "chernobylite" created from the nuclear aftermath.

== Synopsis ==
=== Setting and characters ===
The game is set in the Chernobyl Exclusion Zone 30 years after the Chernobyl disaster. Following the disaster, a strange material dubbed "Chernobylite" began to appear in the Zone. Interested in Chernobylite's potential applications, the military contractor NAR has leased the entire Zone in order to carry out experiments that are led by Chernobylite specialist Dr. Semonov. The presence of Chernobylite also attracts Shadows, extradimensional creatures that are hostile to humans. In order to secure their investment, the NAR enlists the services of former Soviet General Kozlov and the mysterious and dangerous Black Stalker to remove any intruders into the Zone by any means necessary.

Meanwhile, Ukrainian physicist Igor Khymynuk arrives in the Zone to search for his missing fiancée Tatyana, who disappeared shortly before the Chernobyl disaster. In order to find her and uncover the conspiracy behind her disappearance, Igor may recruit allies in the Zone, such as the Canadian mercenary Olivier, guerilla freedom fighter Olga, the mysterious hermit Tarakhan, outlaw Sashko, and local Stalker Mikhail.

=== Plot ===
After receiving a picture of his missing wife Tatyana and being haunted by her in his dreams, Igor decides to travel to the Chernobyl Exclusion Zone and sneak into the Chernobyl Nuclear Power Plant to find answers, as both he and Tatyana used to work at the plant and Tatyana disappeared shortly before the disaster. Igor successfully breaks into the power plant and recovers a Chernobylite crystal, which he uses to power a special portal gun he had developed. However, he is then attacked by the Black Stalker and forced to flee before he can find Tatyana.

With his first intrusion a failure, Igor realizes that he will need a better plan, along with resources and allies to help him break through the NAR defenses around the plant. As he journeys around the Zone, he has the option of recruiting allies such as Olivier, Olga, Tarakhan, Sashko, and Mikhail, as well as negotiating with or killing Dr. Semonov and General Kozlov. Meanwhile, Chernobylite continues to spread around the zone, bringing more Shadows in its wake. Igor also discovers that thanks to his connection to Tatyana and Chernobylite, whenever he dies, he will be sent to an alternate timeline. In addition, while dead, he can change past decisions in order to change their outcomes.

Eventually, Igor learns that Tatyana was abducted by the KGB after she was reported by their close friend Boris, who was jealous of Igor and Tatyana's relationship. Both Tatyana and Boris were subjected to Chernobylite experiments, with Boris eventually becoming the Black Stalker while Tatyana serves as a conduit to open a portal to the source of Chernobylite. Igor also learns that Chernobylite itself is actually a living organism that has its own intelligence and will.

When all preparations are complete, Igor and his allies manage to break into the power plant once again. Igor decides to travel deeper into the plant alone, where he confronts the Black Stalker. The Black Stalker reveals that he is not actually Boris, but the real Igor who killed Boris and assumed his identity. He further reveals that Igor is in fact Tatyana's son, created as a clone of the original Igor by the Chernobylite. Concerned for Igor's safety, Tatyana had the Black Stalker break Igor out of NAR custody, though thanks to Igor's flawed mental development as a child, he has no memory of it. Igor somehow inherited the original Igor's memories, making himself believe he is Igor, and it was Dr. Semonov that originally sent the picture of Tatyana to him to lure him to the Zone. Since shutting down the portal will kill Tatyana, the Black Stalker decides to fight Igor, with Igor ultimately becoming the victor.

At this point, the Black Stalker pleads with Igor, telling him that instead of destroying the portal and killing Tatyana, he can instead enter the portal and destroy the Chernobylite at its source, which should free Tatyana. If Igor does choose to enter the portal, the Chernobylite reveals it created Igor to serve as its method of fully manifesting on Earth, intending to save humanity by purging it and remaking it. Igor then has the option of communing with the Chernobylite to allow it to carry out its plans or killing himself to deny the Chernobylite a foothold on Earth.

- If Igor chooses to close the portal or kill himself, Chernobylite disappears from the Zone. Igor's surviving allies carry on the fight against NAR, ultimately driving them out of the Zone after the company's shareholders decide to cut their losses now that their investment is gone.
- If Igor chooses to commune with the Chernobylite, he will disappear, and Chernobylite continues to spread in the Zone in greater numbers and will eventually engulf the world despite humanity's best efforts to fight back.

== Development ==
Chernobylite was developed by The Farm 51. The game's map was developed from 3D scans and recreations of the Chernobyl Exclusion Zone in Ukraine.

The Farm 51 started a Kickstarter crowdfunding campaign to help fund further development. The funds were said to be needed to complete the 3D scanning process. On 11 May 2019 the Kickstarter campaign ended having exceeded the $100,000 funding goal and raising $206,671 in total from 3,350 backers. The game entered Steam and GOG.com early access programs on 19 October 2019 and achieved full release on 28 July 2021 for Microsoft Windows.

== Reception ==
Reception

Aggregate score
| Aggregator | Score |
|---|---|
| Metacritic | PC: 75/100; PS4: 60/100; XONE: 82/100; PS5: 78/100; XSXS: 71/100 |

Review scores
| Publication | Score |
|---|---|
| Eurogamer | Recommended |
| GameStar | 80/100 |
| Hardcore Gamer | 4/5 |
| HobbyConsolas | 82/100 |
| Jeuxvideo.com | 14/20 |
| MeriStation | 7.8/10 |
| PC Gamer (US) | 78/100 |
| PC Games (DE) | 6/10 |
| Push Square | 8/10 |
| RPGamer | 3.0/5 |
| RPGFan | 88/100 |
| The Games Machine (Italy) | 7.8/10 |

Chernobylite received "generally favorable" reviews from critics for most platforms, while the PlayStation 4 and Xbox Series X/S versions received "mixed or average" reviews, according to review aggregator website Metacritic.
