= Silverfall =

2007 video game

- European cover art
- Developer: Monte Cristo
- Publishers: EU: Monte Cristo; NA: Atari
- Designer: Stéphane Versini; Jehanne Rousseau
- Platforms: Windows, PlayStation Portable
- Release: Windows: FRA: November 23, 2006; EU: March 9, 2007; NA: March 20, 2007; PlayStation Portable: PAL: August 3, 2007
- Genre: Action role-playing
- Modes: Single-player, multiplayer

Silverfall is an action role-playing video game, developed by software company Monte Cristo for Windows. A port has been made for PlayStation Portable. An expansion for the Windows version of the game, entitled Silverfall: Earth Awakening, was released in 2008. Silverfall: Gold Edition was also released in 2008, containing the main game as well as the expansion.

== Plot ==
The Kingdom of Silverfall is being attacked by an unnamed evil force. The protagonist is asked to go to the city of Cloudworks, a technologically aligned city in the middle of a desert, to search for the Archmage of Silverfall. The protagonist finds the Archmage has been corrupted by the Shadow Mage, who is revealed as the same evil force attacking the kingdom as a whole.The Shadow mage possesses the Archmage's child and flees in its new vessel.

The party then returns to the ruined Silverfall to find the water supply has been contaminated by the undead summoned by the Shadow Mage, and must be purified by Gaian druids. The druids agree to bless the water, but ask that the protagonist kill the Prince of the corrupt Elves to prevent further attacks. The party slay the Prince.

The party receives the water to cleanse Silverfall's supplies but as they return, they discover the king has been killed and the princess kidnapped. The few clues left behind leads the party to Greybay.

In the Greybay docks, the party fights their way to a ship belonging to the Princess' kidnappers and kill the captain of the ship. On his body, directions are found to the Necroraider graveyard where the Princess is being held. The party then fight their way to the crypt of Iznahel, the creator of the Necroraiders. Upon Iznahel's defeat, the protagonist discovers that the means to defeat the Shadow Mage lie in the mountain town of Steelight.

Once there, they find that the current Duke of Steelight's health is rapidly failing. The duke's mother asks the player to find the legitimate heir, her grandchild, whom she exiled several years before. In exchange for finding the heir, the protagonist will be given the stone to save the Archmage's child. The child is rescued and returns to his grandmother.

The protagonist receives the stone to cleanse the Archmage's child, but before they can do so, the King of Darkness arrives and kills the child. It is revealed that the King of Darkness is creating a portal in the dwarven palace and after a battle with the protagonist where he's mortally wounded, he manages to escape through the portal to Blaize, where he plans to use the temple to summon the God.

The party follows him through and fights their way to the temple, where the Avatar of the God kills the King of Darkness. The Avatar then attacks the party, but is defeated. The protagonist is declared the King/Queen of the Silverfall.

== Reception ==
Reception

Aggregate score
Aggregator	Score
Metacritic	PC: 62/100

Review scores
Publication	Score
GameSpot	6.5/10
IGN	5.5/10

Silverfall received "mixed or average reviews" on review aggregator Metacritic for the PC version based on 32 Reviews.
