= Faery: Legends of Avalon =

2010 video game

- Developer: Spiders
- Publisher: Focus Home Interactive
- Platforms: Xbox 360, PlayStation 3, Microsoft Windows
- Release: Xbox 360; 10 November 2010; PlayStation 3; 12 January 2011; Windows; 6 May 2011
- Genre: Role-playing

Faery: Legends of Avalon is a role-playing video game released for Xbox 360 on 10 November 2010, and for PlayStation 3 and Microsoft Windows in 2011. It was developed by Spiders Studio and published by Focus Home Interactive.

== Gameplay ==
There are two components to the gameplay of Faery: Legends of Avalon, combat and (non-combat) exploration. The game uses a turn-based combat system. The attacks available to characters are in part determined by the player's choices when leveling up the characters. Outside of combat, the player character can fly, and therefore exploration takes place in three dimensions, as opposed to the more common two dimensional exploration seen in most other role playing games. The game features a small number of options for customizing the player character, including the gender and face of the character, the equipment that the character uses, and what new abilities are gained when the character levels up. All of these options change the in-game appearance of the player character.

== Plot ==
In the game, the player assumes control over a winged faery who has just emerged from stasis. The faery king Oberon informs the player that because humans have stopped believing in faeries, the power of magic has failed and the faery civilization and its inhabitants are slowly being destroyed. The player's objective is to assemble a party of magical creatures and attempt to save several mythical worlds from destruction. The mythical worlds that serve as the game's setting are drawn from preexisting mythologies, and include the ghost ship Flying Dutchman, the great tree Yggdrasil, and the City of Mirage, which is built on the back of a giant beetle.

== Reception ==
Reception

Aggregate score
Aggregator	Score		
Aggregator	PC	PS3	Xbox 360
Metacritic	59/100	57/100	57/100

Review scores
Publication	Score		
Publication	PC	PS3	Xbox 360
Eurogamer	N/A	N/A	5/10
GameRevolution	N/A	N/A	C+
GameSpot	4.5/10	N/A	4.5/10
GameZone	N/A	N/A	7/10
IGN	7/10	7/10	7/10
Official Xbox Magazine (US)	N/A	N/A	6.5/10
PC Gamer (UK)	40%	N/A	N/A
PlayStation: The Official Magazine	N/A	6/10	N/A
RPGamer	N/A	N/A	3/5
RPGFan	N/A	N/A	70%

The game received "mixed" reviews on all platforms according to the review aggregation website Metacritic. Critics praised the game's vivid visuals, which employ cel-shading, the bright and upbeat music, and the creative depictions of several well known mythical worlds. However, they also point out that the quests are tedious and repetitive, that the dialogue is bare bones and contains numerous spelling errors, and that the combat is excessively easy. Kevin VanOrd of GameSpot summarized the Xbox 360 version as "disappointingly threadbare" and stated that "Legends of Avalon amounts to a bunch of bland missions separated by elementary turn-based battles that inspire only a few faint yawns."

The Xbox 360 version sold 48,248 units worldwide by the end of 2011.
