= The Council (video game) =

2018 video game

- Developer: Big Bad Wolf
- Publisher: Focus Home Interactive
- Directors: Sylvain Sechi; Fabrice Granger
- Designer: Pierre Gilbert (lead)
- Writer: Thomas Veauclin
- Composer: Olivier Deriviere
- Engine: CyaTech
- Platforms: Microsoft Windows; PlayStation 4 Xbox One
- Release: Episode 1; 13 March 2018; Episode 2; 15 May 2018; Episode 3; 24 July 2018; Episode 4; 25 September 2018; Episode 5; 4 December 2018
- Genres: Adventure, RPG
- Mode: Single-player

The Council is a 2018 episodic interactive mystery graphic adventure video game developed by Big Bad Wolf and published by Focus Home Interactive. It was released in five episodes between March 13, 2018, and December 4, 2018.

Set in 1793, The Council follows Louis de Richet, a French man searching for his missing mother Sarah, who is the head of the French branch of a secret society known as the Golden Order. Louis arrives on an elusive island near the coast of England where various influential political figures from Europe and the United States are gathering for a mysterious purpose. The game combines fictional characters with real-life figures such as George Washington, Napoléon Bonaparte and Manuel Godoy, all of whom appear as key characters, and also heavily features real-life paintings, books and sculptures as part of its setting and puzzles. The first release of French development studio Big Bad Wolf, a branch of Cyanide, it also incorporates RPG elements in the form of leveling and skill systems, which influence the interactions with both the environment and non-player characters.

The game received a mixed to positive reception, with most praise going to the complex story, setting, and art direction, and most of the criticism aimed at the graphics, character animation, and technical issues.

== Gameplay ==
The player chooses between three classes each with a different set of skills: Diplomat (Etiquette, Conviction, Politics, Diversion and Linguistics), Occultist (Science, Occultism, Manipulation, Erudition and Subterfuges) and Detective (Questioning, Vigilance, Psychology, Logic and Agility). There is a RPG's EXP gaining system, which raises the player character's level and skill levels.

The progression system has 15 available character skills, 44 talents, and 20 traits that will make the character behave differently in accordance with them.

Character skills are where the player can spend points to develop particular abilities, and they are broken down into the three classes mentioned.

Talents are separate from skills, and they bestow permanent character bonuses on the character. Some are gained by leveling skills up to a certain point, performing specific actions, or consulting the game's journal for useful snippets of info about other characters' weaknesses and immunities.

Traits are permanent positive or negative effects the player does not know the character is gaining, as the requisites are hidden from the player.

== Synopsis ==
Louis de Richet is the main character, son of Sarah Faustine de Richet and member of The Golden Order, a fictional secret society which seeks occult artifacts. During the prologue, they are both kept captive as a result of getting caught stealing a book. The captor mentions the book by name: Al-Azif. Following the summoning of Louis to the manor of Lord Mortimer, under the guise of helping find his missing mother Sarah de Richet, secrets regarding the influence of Lord Mortimer upon world leaders begin to unfold.

== Reception ==
Aggregate review scores
Game	Metacritic
The Council	(PC) 67 (PS4) 74
Episode 1: The Mad Ones	(PC) 73 (PS4) 75 (Xbox One) 79
Episode 2: Hide and Seek	(PC) 70 (PS4) 67 (Xbox One) 76
Episode 3: Ripples	(PC) 71 (PS4) 68 (Xbox One) 77
Episode 4: Burning Brides	(PC) 58 (PS4) 75 (Xbox One) 73
Episode 5: Checkmate	(PC) 56 (PS4) 64 (Xbox One) 62

The Council received mixed to positive reviews. On Metacritic, the PC version holds a rating of 67 out of 100, with the PS4 version holding a score of 74.

John-Paul Jones of PlayStation Universe gave a positive review, calling it "an innovative narrative adventure quite unlike any other" and stating: "Though the modest technical execution tarnishes The Council to an extent, it remains an innovative and clever adventure which does that rarest of things - it treats the audience as intelligent, educated individuals. With its sophisticated geopolitical backdrop, occult themes and in-depth RPG style progression and decision systems, The Council sets a compelling blueprint for the episodic adventure to follow."

Brittany Vincent of The Indie Game Website gave a positive review, calling it "a fantastic example of what adventure games are capable of, with tons of content, choices, and characters you won't soon forget", and praising the story and gameplay mechanics which "makes it feel like something is truly on the line. If you fall in love with a particular character but make potentially problematic decisions, you could actually end up losing them. Given the tangled web of decisions you have to make to reach that point, it's not as simple as just reloading your save and doing something else, either."

In a mixed review, Adventure Gamers's Todd Rigney, while praising the game's setting and ideas, criticized the pacing of the story, stating that "sometimes the game doesn't have a whole lot to say despite the mountains of dialogue the characters tend to spew." They also criticized the final episodes, stating "If you've taken the time to play Louis as a proper character, as opposed to simply an avatar in a game, this will force you down one particular path that can completely transform his carefully cultivated personality with a few questionable decisions. This definitely wasn't the ending I'd hoped the series would deliver."
