= Mars: War Logs =

2013 video game

- Developer: Spiders
- Publisher: Focus Home Interactive
- Engine: PhyreEngine
- Platforms: Microsoft Windows, Xbox 360, PlayStation 3
- Release: Microsoft Windows: WW: 26 April 2013; Xbox 360 (XBLA): WW: 26 July 2013; PlayStation 3 (PSN): WW: 13 August 2013
- Genre: Action role-playing
- Mode: Single-player

Mars: War Logs is a cyberpunk role-playing video game developed by Spiders and published by Focus Home Interactive. It was released in 2013 for Microsoft Windows, Xbox 360, and PlayStation 3. The game is set on Mars and features a character who can specialize in stealth, combat or 'technomancy'.

Spiders CEO Jehanne Rousseau has described the game as featuring a variety of companions and side-quests, as well as a world which reacts to the moral choices made by the player. In June 2013, a new English localization was released for the game, containing rewritten game text and rerecorded dialog. It was followed by The Technomancer in 2016.

== Plot ==
The game is set on the colonized planet of Mars, a century after a great, cataclysmic upheaval called the Turmoil. Having lost all communication with Earth, powerful water guilds fight over the scarce sources of water, the most valuable resource on the red planet. Two of the most powerful of these are Aurora and Abundance. The player takes on the role of "Roy" Temperance, an Auroran man with a mysterious past, who finds himself caught between a variety of powerful factions. During his journey, Roy must survive the hostile nature of Mars and battle a variety of mutant creatures created by the planet's radioactive environment.

The game begins at Camp 19, an Abundance POW camp far away from the front. Roy teams up with a young prisoner named Innocence; working together, they eventually manage to escape the camp aboard a prison train. During the prison break, Roy is forced to kill Sean, an Abundance technomancer in charge of the camp. Technomancers are specially trained soldiers armed with pre-Turmoil technology that allows them to channel and discharge electricity generated by their bodies. Equipping Sean's gloves, Roy reveals himself to Innocence as a renegade technomancer himself.

An unspecified time later, Roy and Innocence reach Shadowlair, the capital city of Aurora. With a ceasefire following a strategic Auroran victory at the settlement of Green Hope, both sides have begun demobilizing their troops, but the city remains on high alert due to a recent power struggle between the technomancers and the citizens' militia forces. After learning that his parents were arrested and possibly executed by the technomancers due to their ties with the militia, Innocence joins the local resistance cell led by a man named Marco. Meanwhile, Roy is contacted by Gen. Honour Grant, the supreme commander of the Auroran military, who asks for his help in ascertaining the reasons behind the sudden increase in influence of the technomancers. Gen. Grant is worried that Dowser Wisdom (his old friend and the political leader of Aurora) is being manipulated by the technomancers, and has put together a clandestine task force to investigate the matter. Roy initially refuses the offer, preferring to not get himself involved.

During a raid on a military train transporting political prisoners, several members of the resistance are captured, including Innocence. The player, as Roy, must make the choice of allying with either Marco's rebels or Gen. Grant's task force in order to save Innocence.

- If Roy joins Marco, the rebels are ultimately unable to rescue Innocence, and Roy witnesses the young man being executed by a firing squad. Motivated by revenge, Roy performs several missions of sabotage and espionage for Marco, mostly concerning the mysterious activities of Auroran technomancers at a dig site near Green Hope. It is revealed that the technomancers are, in fact, colluding with Dowser Wisdom and performing unethical experiments on Auroran citizens (mostly political dissidents and former members of the militia); the true goals of this research, however, are not revealed in this story line. The rebels eventually carry out an attack on the Source, the technomancers' base in Shadowlair. Roy and Marco encounter Gen. Grant, who has personally executed Wisdom for his apparent betrayal of the Auroran people. The rebels arrest Grant, take over Shadowlair, and establish a new, democratic government across Aurora. The ultimate fates of both Marco and Gen. Grant are determined by the player, but in most of these outcomes, Roy stays behind in Shadowlair, working as an agent of the new government.
- If Roy joins Gen. Grant, he uses his influence to release Innocence from prison; under Roy's request, Innocence is forcibly relocated to a frontier settlement of Shadevalley for his safety. Roy continues to work for Grant, investigating technomancer activities at Green Hope and Dowser Wisdom's connection to the human experiments conducted there; he also encounters Marco's rebels on several of these missions, and is eventually forced to kill Marco. In this story line, it is revealed that Wisdom has been negatively affected by exposure to the radioactive environment of Mars and began to show early signs of mutation. Scared both for his health and reputation of Aurora, Wisdom has made a deal with Auroran technomancers, agreeing to grant them more political autonomy in exchange for a cure to his mutation. Angered by his old friend's selfishness and betrayal of the Auroran people, Grant confronts and executes Wisdom at the Source. Holding Roy at gunpoint, Grant explains that in order the keep the knowledge of Wisdom's sickness secret, he can't risk letting Roy go; however, Roy reveals that he has kept a detailed record of his operations with Grant's secretive task force, and has arranged for these documents to be released to public should anything happen to him. Grant begrudgingly lets Roy leave Shadowlair. As he boards a train heading to Shadevalley to join Innocence, Roy muses that under Grant's supervision, Aurora is likely to become more authoritarian, and that the war with Abundance is bound to reignite as a result.

Throughout the story, Roy is accompanied by a variety of characters, which include Mary, a mentally unstable technomancer and former apprentice of Sean; Tenacity, a notorious bounty hunter and Roy's former partner in crime; Judy, an idealistic member of the resistance and Marco's second-in-command; and Devotion, Gen. Grant's personal aide who serves him as a spy and assassin. Based on player's choices, Mary, Judy and Devotion can become Roy's romantic interests, with Mary available to be romanced in both story lines, and Judy and Devotion being exclusive to whichever faction Roy joins in the latter half of the game.

== Reception ==
Reception

Aggregate scores
Aggregator	Score
GameRankings	(PC) 59.50% (X360) 61.67% (PS3) 60.00%
Metacritic	(PC) 59/100 (X360) 61/100

Review scores
Publication	Score
IGN	5.3/10
PC Gamer (US)	65%

Mars: War Logs received a mixed reception, with the PC version scoring 59 out of 100 on Metacritic based on 32 reviews and 59.50% on GameRankings based on 20 reviews. The Xbox 360 version scored 61 out of 100 based on six reviews on Metacritic, and 61.67% based on six reviews on GameRankings, while the PlayStation 3 version scored 60.00% based on two reviews on GameRankings.

IGN praised the game as one that "shoots for the moon", saying it is "an attempt to pull off an epic in the style of Mass Effect or The Witcher 2 on a fraction of the budget." However, they criticized the game's "clumsily" handled story line, silly "virtue" names like Morality or Charity, stiff characters and a lack of focus, but stated that while it "isn't a great RPG, it is at least the seed of one – and a seed with some surprisingly green shoots sticking out of it." PC Gamer bemoaned the need to constantly "wrestle with an exuberant camera" and joked that the "combat can't remember if this is a third-person game or one where you don't really need to see anything at all." They also criticized the UI design, "stance" gimmick, uncanny valley facial animation, subtlety-free script, and a rushed final act. PC Gamer recommended the game however, saying "you should consider Mars: War Logs – a budget title that's more entertaining than all my complaints about it would seem to imply. There's also a B-movie charm. It's clumsily goodhearted, and has a couple of great moments where you feel like you're affecting the world. Every bit of it needs more time and money, but it's something of a surprise to find that I left the game genuinely fond of its big, fractionally-realised ambition."
