= The Technomancer =

2016 video game

- Developer: Spiders
- Publisher: Focus Home Interactive
- Composer: Olivier Deriviere
- Engine: PhyreEngine
- Platforms: Microsoft Windows; PlayStation 4 Xbox One
- Release: 28 June 2016
- Genre: Action role-playing
- Mode: Single-player

The Technomancer is a 2016 action role-playing video game developed by Spiders and published by Focus Home Interactive. It is set within the same universe as Spiders' previously developed game, Mars: War Logs. Olivier Deriviere scored the game.

== Gameplay ==
There are three styles of combat. The player can add companions to their party, who can then level up. The player will also be able to improve their own combat abilities, and they can make different choices about how to solve each quest. There are three different endings, and each is slightly modified by several major choices the player makes throughout the game. The player can craft their weapons and armor. There are four different skill trees.

== Plot ==
The game is set during the War of Water, 200 years after human colonization of Mars. The protagonist is a rookie technomancer named Zachariah, a former delinquent from Abundance, one of the powerful water guilds on the red planet. Soon after his initiation as a technomancer, Zachariah finds himself on the run from the guild's secret police. After fleeing the city of Ophir with a group of companions, he takes refuge in the hidden merchant city of Noctis, where he begins his search for a functioning communications beacon in order to reestablish contact with Earth.

== Development ==
The game was first announced on 10 April 2015. Spiders wrote an open letter to PlayStation Blog accompanied by a new trailer for the game. A 13-minute gameplay video was released on 7 August 2015, and another five-minute video was released on 21 June 2015.

In an April interview, CEO Jehanne Rousseau explained that "Mars is a lot bigger in The Technomancer compared to what you saw in Mars: War Logs." There will be several hubs and cities that can be unlocked. Rousseau estimated the main quest to be around 25 to 30 hours of play and "easily extended to around 50 hours with the inclusion of side quests." Overall there are around 4 times as many quests as there were in Bound by Flame. In a second interview when asked about the possibility of DLC, Rousseau stated that the game would be a complete and finished product, and although they do not currently have plans for additional content after launch, Spiders "may consider it at a later date." According to Spiders CEO and Creative Director, Jeanne Rousseau, the game is their largest and most expansive to date.

== Reception ==
Reception

Aggregate score
Aggregator	Score
Metacritic	(PC) 56/100 (PS4) 60/100 (XONE) 68/100

Review scores
Publication	Score
GameSpot	6/10
IGN	4.9/10
PC Gamer (US)	60/100

The Technomancer received "mixed or average" reviews, according to video game review aggregator website Metacritic. IGN stated the game "has all the moving parts of a mid-2000s BioWare game but lacks technical polish and storytelling finesse to a sometimes painful degree." Combat was heavily criticized for its lack of "flow or rhythm" and difficulty that depends on random chance, but they praised the setting.
