= GreedFall =

2019 video game

- Developer: Spiders
- Publisher: Focus Home Interactive
- Designer: Romain Meyer
- Programmer: Wilfried Mallet
- Artist: Cyril Tahmassebi
- Writer: Jehanne Rousseau
- Composer: Olivier Deriviere
- Platforms: Microsoft Windows; PlayStation 4; Xbox One; PlayStation 5; Xbox Series X/S
- Release: Windows, PS4, Xbox One; September 10, 2019; PS5, Series X/S; June 30, 2021
- Genre: Action role-playing
- Mode: Single-player

GreedFall is an action role-playing game developed by Spiders and published by Focus Home Interactive. The game is set in an early 18th century-styled setting and was released for Microsoft Windows, PlayStation 4, and Xbox One on September 10, 2019, and subsequently in a graphically uplifted and performance enhanced version for PlayStation 5 and Xbox Series X/S on June 30, 2021.

GreedFall was met with a mixed critical reception. A prequel, titled GreedFall: The Dying World, was released on March 10, 2026.

== Gameplay ==
The player, alongside other settlers, mercenaries, and treasure hunters, explores a remote island where the locals, who are fighting off invading settlers, are protected by supernatural beings. The game includes combat, diplomacy, and stealth. The player's decisions influence and affect the game's story, as well as the relationship between the different factions established on the island. The game also supports enhanced graphical capabilities on the PlayStation 4 Pro and Xbox One X.

== Synopsis ==
=== Setting ===
An island paradise has been discovered by colonial forces from several distinct nations from fictional lands, but with magic and monsters. Players assume the role of De Sardet, a neutral Human who recently arrived at the island, able to ally with either the natives who inhabit the land, or any of the foreign nations competing to conquer and colonize the "new" land, while also trying to find a cure to a mysterious illness that plagues De Sardet and their homeland.

=== Plot ===
De Sardet, a noble of the Merchant Congregation, travels to the newly settled island of Teer Fradee to serve as Legate to Prince Constantin d'Orsay, their cousin and the newly appointed governor of New Serene, the Congregation's capital on the island. The Congregation hopes that the exotic environment of Teer Fradee will yield a cure for the malichor, a deadly plague spreading on the continent.

On arrival, De Sardet is quickly dispatched to establish diplomatic relations with the island natives and two neighboring countries with a presence on the island. They gain several new allies and learn of the doneigada, native islanders with a supernatural bond to the earth that grants them mystical abilities. The natives worship a being known as "en on mil frichtimen" which has a connection to the island. Believing en on mil frichtimen is real and capable of curing the malichor with its power, De Sardet begins seeking a way to speak with it.

Constantin's health begins to decline; he soon learns he is infected with the malichor. After thwarting an attempted coup by the Congregation's mercenary guards, De Sardet contacts a native healer named Catasach to relieve Constantin's pain while the search for a cure continues. They learn that en on mil frichtimen's sanctuary can only be opened by the high king of the natives, Vinbarr, who has been missing for months. Upon returning to New Serene, De Sardet finds Catasach dead and Constantin taken by Vinbarr. Tracking Vinbarr to his lair, De Sardet kills him and rescues Constantin.

Three days later, Constantin's sickness is cured, but his physical appearance has changed, becoming similar to that of the natives. He reveals that Catasach performed a ritual that turned him into a doneigad, making him resistant to the malichor. With Vinbarr dead, De Sardet intervenes in the natives' election of the new high king, and the winning candidate grants them entry into the sanctuary. En on mil frichtimen reveals that the malichor is not a disease, but a poison generated by the continent in response to its exploitation by its people. It promises to help cure the malichor, but warns that Constantin's actions are weakening it.

Confused and horrified by the warning, De Sardet discovers that Constantin has become addicted to his doneigad powers, and is performing more rituals to steal more of the island's power from en on mil frichtimen, intending to destroy both the natives and the settlers and rule the island alone. De Sardet confronts Constantin alone in the sanctuary, and is given the choice to either kill him and leave the island's fate in the hands of the factions, or join him in conquering the island.

If the player chooses to kill Constantin, the ending that follows will vary depending on the elected high king and the player's relationship with their companions and the various factions on Teer Fradee. If the player chooses to join Constantin, the two cousins steal en on mil frichtimen's power and become godlike beings, unleashing a reign of terror upon the world.

== Reception ==
Reception

Aggregate score
| Aggregator | Score |
|---|---|
| Metacritic | PC: 72/100; PS4: 72/100; XONE: 78/100; PS5: 73/100 |

Review scores
| Publication | Score |
|---|---|
| Destructoid | 6/10 |
| Eurogamer | Recommended |
| Game Informer | 7.25/10 |
| GameSpot | 5/10 |
| IGN | 8.2/10 |
| PC Gamer (US) | 67/100 |
| Push Square | 7/10 |
| RPGamer | 3.5/5 |
| Shacknews | 7/10 |
| USgamer | 3/5 |

GreedFall received "mixed or average reviews" on review aggregator website Metacritic for the PC and PlayStation 4 versions based on 38 and 37 reviews respectively, while the Xbox One version received "generally favorable reviews" based on 14 reviews.

The game was nominated for "Best RPG" at the 2019 Titanium Awards, for "Game, Original Role Playing" at the NAVGTR Awards, and for "Best Message-Bearer Game", "Best Artistic Design", and "Best Game Setting" at the Pégases Awards 2020.

=== Sales ===
The PlayStation 4 version of GreedFall sold 13,292 physical copies within its first week on sale in Japan, making it the seventh bestselling retail game of the week in the country. It was confirmed in November 2020 that Greedfall had sold over one million copies worldwide. By May 2022, the game had shipped two million copies.

== Prequel ==
A prequel titled GreedFall: The Dying World was announced on May 18, 2022. It was released for PlayStation 5, Xbox Series X/S, and Steam on March 12, 2026.
