= Styx: Master of Shadows =

2014 video game

- Developer: Cyanide
- Publisher: Focus Home Interactive
- Composer: Henri-Pierre Pellegrin
- Engine: Unreal Engine 3
- Platforms: Microsoft Windows; PlayStation 4; Xbox One
- Release: 7 October 2014
- Genre: Stealth
- Mode: Single-player

Styx: Master of Shadows is a stealth video game developed by Cyanide Studios for Microsoft Windows, PlayStation 4 and Xbox One. The game is a prequel, and the second video game to take place in the world established by 2012's Of Orcs and Men. The game received a sequel, Styx: Shards of Darkness, in 2017.

== Gameplay ==
Styx: Master of Shadows is a stealth game where the player must keep to the shadows to survive. Styx has arcane abilities that assist him in his escapades, including the ability to make himself invisible (also featured in Of Orcs and Men), and the ability to use amber-vision to detect hidden foes and areas. His ability to clone himself through magic offers opportunities to disrupt the traditional stealth gaming formula. It gives the player a clone for purposes such as scouting without risk and creating a diversion.

Guards, soldiers and other protectors of the Tower will adapt their behavior dynamically, depending on the player's actions. The player is expected to keep a low profile and prepare a course of action beforehand: study the guard patrols closely, use areas of light and shadow to one's advantage, lure a target to a secluded area to assassinate him silently, or arrange "accidents" to remain undetected. Styx: Master of Shadows also includes RPG game mechanics, the player gains experience, which can unlock new skills, special moves, new and more lethal weapons, all divided into six talent trees.

== Plot ==
Taking place before the events of the previous game, Styx infiltrates the Tower of Akenash, a massive flying fortress held aloft by the magic of the World Tree, around which the fortress was built. Styx desires to reach the heart of the World-Tree and rescue an imprisoned friend elsewhere in the fortress, but he doesn't know why he wants to do these things: he suffers from confused memories and a voice in his head that prods him on. When he finally liberates his "friend", he discovers that it is a creature identical to himself. The creature that the player has been controlling since the beginning of the game has in fact been a clone of the real Styx, who has been held in an interrogation chamber all this time.

The original Styx was once an orc scholar who sought to study the World Tree, and somehow was transformed by the tree's magical amber into the small creature he is now (the first goblin). He has for centuries been plagued by the voices of the elves who sleep among the roots of the World Tree. The elves share a telepathic hive mind, and because they too are creatures of the amber, Styx can hear their constant chatter and cannot shut it out. Stealing the heart of the World-Tree will silence the elves permanently and possibly give him a means to become an orc again.

One of the gifts that the amber gave Original-Styx was the ability to spawn clones of himself. Usually these clones are stupid thralls, but when Original-Styx infiltrated Akenash, he created a clone with an exceptionally high degree of intelligence so that it could accomplish more difficult tasks without guidance, such as rescuing Original-Styx if he were captured. Original-Styx still considers this clone to be a disposable tool like all the others. Furious, Clone-Styx swears to destroy Original-Styx and make a new life for himself.

With the help of an elf, Clone-Styx breaks the telepathic control that Original-Styx has on him, then chases Original-Styx to the Heart of the World Tree. Clone-Styx destroys the Heart, then commits suicide by leaping into the pool of amber at the base of the tree. Hordes of Styx clones (stupid and feral) emerge from the amber and instinctively tear Original-Styx apart. As the World Tree dies, the magic that keeps Akenash aloft fails and the tower crashes to the ground. The feral clones of Styx emerge from the ruins and disperse into the wilderness. This is the birth of the goblin race. All these goblins are stupid except for one, with higher intelligence but with no memories other than that his name is Styx. It is not certain whether this is Original-Styx or Clone-Styx, or a new goblin altogether, but regardless, this goblin is now the one and only Styx.

== Reception ==
Reception

Aggregate score
Aggregator	Score
Metacritic	PC: 71/100; PS4: 70/100; XONE: 69/100

Review scores
Publication	Score
GameSpot	5/10
Hardcore Gamer	4.5/5
IGN	7.2/10
Official Xbox Magazine (US)	8/10

Styx: Master of Shadows received mixed reviews. Aggregating review website Metacritic gave the Xbox One version 69/100 based on 8 reviews, the Microsoft Windows version 71/100 based on 31 reviews, and the PlayStation 4 version 70/100 based on 9 reviews.

Britton Peele of GameSpot complained that the combat "feels stiff and unwieldy, making battle a painful experience whether you win or lose." However, some publications praised the system for disincentivizing confrontation. Geoff Thew of Hardcore Gamer said that Styx "makes full-on assaults next to impossible, and forces you to observe, think, and plan in order to advance.". They went on to say that, as a pure stealth game, Styx delivers "a satisfying tension that few games can match", and praised its levels for having "much more depth than the flat environments typical of the genre," concluding that Styx is "one of the best titles the [stealth] genre has to offer." Heather Newman of VentureBeat said that Styx is "truly engrossing for hardcore stealth fans, at a bargain price," and advised that you should "be ready to save often and die a lot — with a smile on your face."

== Sequel ==
A sequel of the game, titled Styx: Shards of Darkness was announced on 14 October 2015. It is powered by Unreal Engine 4, and has a larger budget than the original Master of Shadows. The game was released worldwide on 14 March 2017 for Microsoft Windows, PlayStation 4, and Xbox One. A third game, titled Styx: Blades of Greed, was announced in early 2025 and was released on 19 February 2026.
