= Confrontation (video game) =

2012 video game

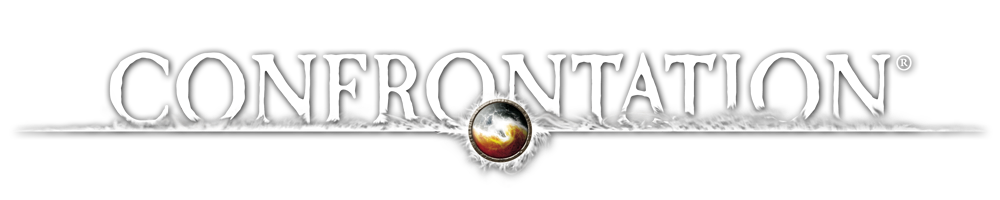
- Developer(s): Cyanide
- Publisher(s): Focus Home Interactive
- Platform(s): Microsoft Windows
- Release: April 5, 2012
- Genre(s): Role-playing game
- Mode(s): Single-player, multiplayer

Confrontation is a tactical role-playing game developed by Cyanide and based on Rackham's miniatures game. The game is set in the fantasy universe of Aarklash, a continent riven by an unending war. The player follows a party of Akkylannian fighters in their quest to seek out and destroy the source of the latest threat posed by the Alchemists of Dirz. Their journey will take them through numerous settings with rich decors where they will encounter other races which populate the continent.

== Gameplay ==
Confrontation aims to reproduce the tactical combat of heroic fantasy classics as Baldur's Gate. The party is made up of four characters, chosen by the player amongst 12 available classes. Various synergies are possible and any combination could work to succeed a mission. However, it is far more challenging with an unbalanced party.

Four of Aarklash's factions are found in the game. The Akkylannian people built an empire whose aims are both religious and military. The Syhar are depraved scientists, specialized in alchemy and ungodly experiments. Their origins lie within the Empire of Akkylannie, but their quest to create the perfect being led them to be condemned for heresy and they were forced to flee. Seeking an army to protect themselves, the Syhars mixed goblin blood with that of men and created the Orcs. The union of Yllia, the Moon goddess, with the leader of a great pack of wolves, lead to the birth of the Wolfen. They are the protectors of nature and are guided only by their predatory instincts.

== Reception ==
The game received "mixed" reviews, according to video game review aggregator Metacritic.
