= Styx: Shards of Darkness =

2017 video game

- Developer: Cyanide
- Publisher: Focus Home Interactive
- Director: Julien Desourteaux
- Producer: Antoine Villepreux
- Designer: Mathias Chataignier
- Programmer: Colas Markowski
- Artist: Sophie Legrand
- Writers: Rémi Guerin; Mathieu Weschler
- Composer: Henri-Pierre Pellegrin
- Engine: Unreal Engine 4
- Platforms: Microsoft Windows; PlayStation 4; Xbox One
- Release: 14 March 2017
- Genre: Stealth
- Modes: Single-player, multiplayer

Styx: Shards of Darkness is a stealth video game developed by French developer Cyanide and published by Focus Home Interactive. The game was released worldwide on 14 March 2017 for Microsoft Windows, PlayStation 4, and Xbox One. It is the sequel to the 2014 game Styx: Master of Shadows, and the third game set in the fictional world of the Of Orcs and Men series. A sequel, Styx: Blades of Greed, was released in 2026.

== Gameplay ==
Like its predecessor, Styx is able to clone himself and to lay traps for his enemies, and can temporarily turn invisible. The player has the option of engaging enemies or avoiding them. Ropes and grappling hooks can be used to reach high areas. There is also a multiplayer co-op mode, with the second player controlling one of Styx's clones.

== Plot ==
=== Background ===
The game takes place several decades after the events of Master of Shadows. Most communities in the world are suffering from goblin infestations. Goblins in general are stupid creatures and most people consider them to be vermin ("rakash"). Styx is an exceptional goblin who has human-like intelligence and can talk, and he doesn't care much for his fellow goblins either. Styx works as a thief and assassin for hire.

=== Main story ===
Styx plies his trade in the slum town of Thoben, which is infested with goblins. There, a goblin hunter named Helledryn hires Styx to steal a magical scepter from an ambassador to the dark elves, with the promise of amber as payment. Styx breaks into the ambassador's airship, but before he can grab the scepter, a shapeshifting dark elf takes it first. He attaches a large crystal to the staff and uses it to paralyze Styx. He then shapeshifts into a human and raises the alarm, forcing Styx to flee empty-handed.

Helledryn wanted the scepter so that she could gain entry into the dark elf mountain fortress of Korrangar and spy on a diplomatic summit. She asks Styx to help her infiltrate the fortress, which he agrees to for a hefty payment in amber. Styx also wants to get revenge on the shapeshifting elf and investigate his scepter.

Korrangar is ruled by a priestess named Lyssril. A routine practice of her devotees is to consume daily doses of amber, and occasionally they sacrifice themselves to a monster they call Laxima. Styx overhears some dark elves talking about an outcast named Djarak, who was the elf Styx encountered in Thoben.

Styx obtains a dark elf disguise for Helledryn to infiltrate the diplomatic summit, and learns that Djarak has disguised himself as a human diplomat. At the meeting, Lyssril demonstrates a magical crystal called Quartz that can paralyze goblins at a distance. With these Quartz scepters, the humans and dwarves will be able to remove the goblin infestations from their communities. Furthermore, Lyssril offers to pay the humans and dwarves if they deliver live goblins to Korrangar, though she refuses to explain for what purpose. As the meeting draws to a close, Helledryn spots the disguised Djarak and tries to lure him out. Djarak senses the ruse and tries to assassinate Lyssril, and fails.

Styx discovers that Laxima is a Roabie Queen. In exchange for the sacrifices, Laxima uses her supernatural power to refine the Quartz that the dark elves have been digging out of their mountain. Styx kills the Roabie Queen, but he is spotted by a dark elf guard, and Korrangar launches a manhunt for a "talking goblin". Styx and Helledryn flee to Thoben.

In Thoben, Styx helps Helledryn dispose of some colleagues who backstabbed her. When Styx returns to his hideout, he is captured in a trap by the dark elves. The dark elves take Styx back to Korrangar and prepare to ritually sacrifice him, but he escapes with the aid of Djarak.

Djarak explains to Styx that the amber that Lyssril gives her followers is addictive, and also connects them telepathically, eroding their sense of individuality. It reminds Styx of how the humans back in Akenash became addicted to the amber of the World Tree (see Styx: Master of Shadows). Djarak wants to free his people of their thralldom by destroying Lyssril's amber reserves. He asks Styx to help him, warning Styx that he'll never be safe so long as Lyssril is in power, because Lyssril can sense Styx's location through the amber in his blood, which is how she was able to find his hideout in Thoben. Styx cannot attack Lyssril directly because of this, so Djarak suggests an indirect way: they will instigate a war between the dark elves and the dwarves by murdering the dwarven ambassador and framing Lyssril. Styx murders the dwarven ambassador and plants a dagger belonging to Lyssril on his body.

Styx found a diagram on the dwarven ambassador that describes some sort of amber-making machine they designed for the dark elves, and they decide they must destroy it, so they return to Korrangar with explosives. In Korrangar, the dark elves are in disarray as Lyssril has fled the fortress. Styx discovers that the elves' amber machine extracts amber from the bodies of slaughtered goblins. Styx and Djarak destroy the slaughterhouse and the amber reservoirs.

With their mission complete, Styx and Djarak try to flee Korrangar, but are blocked by a giant golem. The golem was a gift from the dwarves to the dark elves, which suggests that the dwarves had always planned to attack the dark elves and the golem is a trojan horse. Djarak is seemingly killed by falling rubble, so Styx is forced to fight the golem alone. After defeating the golem, he jumps on Helledryn's ship as it leaves Korrangar, and he finds Djarak at the helm. Styx is furious that Djarak abandoned him, and the game ends with Styx pointing his crossbow at Djarak.

== Development ==
The game was announced on 14 October 2015. Developer Cyanide confirmed that it would have a bigger budget and that it would run on a new engine. At the time of its announcement, it had been in development for six months. A new trailer was displayed at E3 2016.

== Reception ==
Reception

Aggregate score
Aggregator	Score
Metacritic	PC: 72/100; PS4: 72/100; XONE: 72/100

Review scores
Publication	Score
Destructoid	7/10
IGN	7.8/10
PC Gamer (US)	79/100

Styx: Shards of Darkness received "mixed or average" reviews, according to video game review aggregator platform Metacritic. Destructoid's Nic Rowen scored the game a 7/10 with the consensus "Solid and definitely has an audience. There could be some hard-to-ignore faults, but the experience is fun." Leif Johnson from IGN gave the game a score of 7.8/10 saying that "Styx: Shards of Darkness is a challenging stealth adventure with just as much snark as it has sneaking." Jon Morcom of PC Gamer awarded it a 79/100 stating that "A mean-spirited character leads a big-hearted game; you're unlikely to dwell on its lore but its features combine well to create a satisfying stealth experience."
