= Call of Cthulhu (video game) =

2018 video game

- Developer: Cyanide
- Publisher: Focus Home Interactive
- Director: Jérémie Monedero
- Designers: Jean-Marc Gueney; Jérémie Monedero
- Programmer: Jonathan Leemans
- Artists: Faouzi Hamida; Rémi Mennerat
- Writers: Pia-Victoria Jacqmart; Maximilian Lutz
- Composer: Markus Schmidt
- Engine: Unreal Engine 4
- Platforms: Microsoft Windows; PlayStation 4; Xbox One; Nintendo Switch
- Release: Microsoft Windows, PlayStation 4, Xbox One: WW: 30 October 2018; Nintendo Switch: WW: 8 October 2019
- Genres: Role-playing, survival horror
- Mode: Single-player

Call of Cthulhu is a role-playing survival horror video game developed by Cyanide and published by Focus Home Interactive for Microsoft Windows, PlayStation 4, Xbox One and Nintendo Switch. The game features a semi-open world environment and incorporates themes of Lovecraftian and psychological horror into a story that includes elements of investigation and stealth. Despite its title, it is not a direct adaptation of H. P. Lovecraft's short story "The Call of Cthulhu" as it is mostly based on the Cthulhu Mythos along with the 1981 role-playing game of the same title.

== Plot ==
In 1924 Boston, private investigator and war veteran Edward Pierce suffers from increasingly bizarre nightmares and self-medicates with sleeping pills and alcohol. He is soon contacted to look into the case of the Hawkins family, who mysteriously died in a fire. As the only clue is a strange picture painted by the wife, Sarah, shortly before her death, Edward has to set out to Darkwater Island off the coast to find out more about the matter.

Upon arriving in Darkwater, Pierce is steeped in the strange local culture. Darkwater was home to a booming whaling industry until a sudden scarcity in 1847. That year, the island's last ship, the Scylla, returned with a legendary "Miraculous Catch", that saved the island. The islanders are superstitious and suspicious of outsiders like Pierce. The detective meets Captain Fitzroy, who provides him with a few details of the Hawkins family; Officer Bradley, who handled the case; and Cat Baker, a successful bootlegger and feared gang leader. He also sees a beached killer whale, killed by ghastly wounds, being dragged back into the sea by the police, much to the locals' chagrin.

While exploring the Hawkins' mansion with Bradley, Pierce learns more about the Hawkins family. Sarah was a famous painter known for her macabre style, but also rumoured to have been mentally unstable. Pierce determines that the fire may not have been an accident, and furthermore, someone may have survived. Shortly after, he is accosted by a robed man who is stealing something from the attic. Pierce and Bradley give chase and soon discover a hidden door that leads to secret caves and tunnels beneath the island. There, they discover the thief and other cultists performing a ritual. Bradley recognizes the leader as Charles Hawkins, thought dead in the fire. Hawkins is horrifically mutated now and kills Bradley with a tentacled arm. Pierce barely escapes, but passes out when he is trapped in the collapsing cave.

He awakens in the basement of the Riverside Institute, a suspiciously large mental hospital, under the care of Dr. Fuller. He is drugged and suffers more nightmares and hallucinations, including visits from an otherworldly voice that seems to be directing certain events. Eventually, he escapes with the help of Dr. Marie Colden. Along the way he discovers evidence of strange experiments by Fuller. He also encounters Francis Sanders, who had been given a painting by Sarah. Francis is another patient/prisoner of Fuller, and after speaking to Pierce about "The Shambler", he is brutally killed by an unseen force. Once back at the Hawkins mansion, Pierce, Colden and a suddenly alive Bradley (who has a broken recollection of his supposed death) decide to visit the widowed Mrs. Sanders and learn more about Francis and The Shambler. At the Sanders house, he also finds Cat once more, there to help the widow sell her late husband's art collection.

The Shambler was a painting by Sarah that she gave to Francis after much resistance. Pierce examines the painting, which comes to life and pits him against the physical manifestation of the creature. He manages to banish it by slashing the painting with a ritualistic dagger from the Sanders art gallery.

His investigation then leads him to a bookstore owned by Algernon Drake, a friend of Sarah Hawkins, where he discovers the Necronomicon in a safe. Upon reading the book, he has an out of body experience that places him into the mind of Marie Colden, seeing events at the Institute through her eyes. After discovering numerous patients exhibiting signs of mutation, Colden confronts Fuller about his experiments and is knocked out. Upon returning to his body, Pierce is confronted by Drake, and the two form a shaky alliance.

Pierce rushes to the institute to save Colden, but after suffering more hallucinations and taunting by the voice in his head, finds her dead at Fuller's hands. Exploring further, he discovers Sarah Hawkins, imprisoned but alive. The two run, but are stopped by the monstrous Charles Hawkins, who claims he was trying to protect Sarah from the cult due to her gifts as an "Oracle". Pierce and Sarah defeat and kill Charles, before escaping back to the mansion, leaving the Institute in flames. In their fight with Charles, a strange liquid, responsible for a gas that causes hallucinations and mutations in the living and is circulated throughout the Institute basement, is set alight by the institute's furnace.

Back at the mansion, Pierce finds an amulet Charles had hidden, which Drake says can protect Sarah from the cult's influence. Exiting the house, Pierce is arrested by Darkwater police after being identified as the perpetrator of the Riverside Institute fire. While at the jail, he is visited by a ghostly figure, who identifies itself as "Leviathan". It speaks to Pierce about destiny and offers him a gift in the form of knowledge. Pierce once again leaves his body and experiences events through Sarah's eyes as she and Drake perform a ritual to banish the Shambler for good (Drake can die here, depending on the player's actions). Back in his cell, Pierce is again visited by Leviathan, and shown visions of his companions: Bradley doubts himself and their fight against the cult; Cat is shown shooting and killing Pierce; and Sarah is shown painting a portrait of him, calling him the "Truth Seeker". His consciousness is then sent to Cat at her gang's warehouse examining a dead policeman left there, where she discovers he was killed by a Cult after happening upon their meeting. The gang is then attacked by the local fishermen, seemingly bewitched by Leviathan's influence.

Pierce is released from his cell by Bradley, who is also succumbing to the madness. Pierce takes his gun and fights his way to the whaling station, where Sarah was seen heading. There, he discovers the secret of the island's dark history. The "Miraculous Catch" of 1847 was Leviathan. The crew of the Scylla captured the enormous creature and were driven mad by its influence. Some of them, namely Fitzroy, Fuller and Charles Hawkins, ate its flesh, gaining immortality. The Leviathan seems to have wanted to be caught, in order to direct through its influence the events that followed, including Pierce's arrival to the island and his actions in the whaling station. While trapped in a hallucination, Pierce causes an explosion that destroys the whaling station, freeing Leviathan. The Cult, led by Fitzroy, tell Pierce that he is not there of his own accord. Pierce rebels, attempting to flee, but falls into the water, encountering Leviathan one last time before it swims back to the depths of the sea.

Pierce washes up near a coastal cave and makes his way through the tunnels toward Alabaster Point, a place of cyclopean architecture. Along the way, he encounters visions of Marie Colden, Dr. Fuller and Charles Hawkins. He finally arrives at the Cult's meeting place, where a strange storm is brewing over the ocean, and a great tentacle can be seen beyond the veil. Drake (if he survived) is seen captured and held hostage by the cult. Sarah, a fully willing cultist now, explains his destiny to Pierce and he is given the choice to give in to the madness and help perform the Cult's ritual or not. Depending on choices made throughout the game: dialogue, exploration and events that affect Pierce's sanity, there are four possible endings:

- If Pierce's sanity is intact, he can refuse to take part in the ritual. Sarah Hawkins, not able to fight Pierce's free will, kills herself. Later, Pierce is seen back at his office in Boston, drunk and depressed, traumatized by the events and staring at a painting depicting Sarah's suicide.
- If Pierce's sanity is broken, he can choose to shoot himself, ruining the cult's chances of performing their ritual. Later, his office in Boston is seen being cleared out, but a painting of his suicide is seen in the room.
- If Drake survived his battle with the Shambler, Pierce can free him from his cultist captors and have him perform a counter-ritual. The storm and the cult disappear forever. Later, Pierce is seen in Riverside Institute, insane and being treated by Fuller.
- Lastly, Pierce always has the option to give in and perform the ritual. His blood is spilled by the ritualistic dagger, and the storm grows, summoning the Great Old One Cthulhu. The arrival of the entity causes those present to go mad, fighting and killing each other. Pierce surveys the violence before joining in, killing Sarah in a mad frenzy.

== Development ==
On 16 January 2014, publisher Focus Home Interactive announced via Twitter that video game developer Frogwares was working on developing the game. They also announced that the game would be released on Microsoft Windows and "next-gen consoles". Later that month, a Frogwares spokesperson said that the game was still in "early development". They noted that the game would have a focus on investigations in a horror setting and that they would be using the experience from developing their Adventures of Sherlock Holmes series. They also revealed that they were working with multiple writers who had written scenarios for the 1981 role-playing game Call of Cthulhu.

After two years of inactivity on the title, prompting concerns that the game might have been canceled, Focus Home announced the game again in February 2016, in development for release in 2017 by studio Cyanide. They revealed that the game would be a semi-open world investigative role-playing game with elements of stealth and psychological horror. The game will be built on the Unreal Engine 4 game engine. It will be more closely based on the Call of Cthulhu "pen and paper" role-playing video game than on H. P. Lovecraft's original short story of the same name. Frogwares went on to make their own Cthulhu-esque game called The Sinking City, which came out in 2019.

Focus Home Interactive released the first trailer for the game just before E3 2016, on 10 June 2016. A "Depths of Madness" trailer was released on 19 January 2017. The game was at first scheduled for release on Microsoft Windows, PlayStation 4 and Xbox One in the fourth quarter of 2017. In September 2017, however, the game was delayed to 2018. The game was released worldwide on 30 October 2018.

== Reception ==
Reception

Aggregate score
Aggregator	Score
Metacritic	PC: 67/100; PS4: 63/100; XONE: 66/100; NS: 68/100

Review scores
Publication	Score
Adventure Gamers	4/5
Game Informer	6.75/10
GameSpot	5/10
IGN	8.6/10
PC Gamer (US)	59/100
VideoGamer.com	4/10

Call of Cthulhu received "mixed or average" reviews, according to review aggregator Metacritic. The general consensus is that while both the graphics and atmosphere are great, the game progression is not well implemented with unclear story elements and poor RPG mechanics.

GameSpot's David Wildgoose was critical of Call of Cthulhu, saying that the RPG element felt "undernourished". He added that "the differences between having leveled up your Strength stat instead of your Investigation stat feel ambiguous at best and trivial at worst." Neil Bolt of Bloody Disgusting writes that both stealth and combat gameplay is not well explained in the game. While it captures the essence of Lovecraft's work well, he criticised the character models for their unpolished look and the fact most of them look so similar. PC Gamer's Samuel Horti calls it "a mediocre detective game with predictable stealth and a surreal story that runs out of steam near the end."

However, DM Schmeyer of IGN praised the game with a rating of 8.6/10. He said the dialogue options is one of the best features in Call of Cthulhu, unlike other games that are more "stunted and unimaginative". He concluded that despite its poor level and encounter design, the "engaging mystery and an intriguing utilization of RPG mechanics make it one of the more enjoyable Lovecraftian games in years."
