= Aarklash: Legacy =

2013 tactical role-playing video game

Aarklash Legacy
- Developer(s): Cyanide
- Publisher(s): Bigben Interactive
- Platform(s): Microsoft Windows
- Release: US: 12 September 2013
- Genre(s): Tactical RPG
- Mode(s): Single-player

Aarklash Legacy is a tactical role-playing video game developed by Cyanide and published by Bigben Interactive. It was released in 2013 for Microsoft Windows. Inspired by the Confrontation figurines universe, the game sees the player control 4 characters from a cast of 8 to form their party.

== Reception ==
Reception

Aggregate score
Aggregator	Score
Metacritic	72/100

Review scores
Publication	Score
Eurogamer	7/10
IGN	7.5/10
PC PowerPlay	8/10

Aarklash Legacy received "mixed or average" reviews, according to Metacritic with a score of 72 from critics and 7.7 for users as of October 2019. Some critics commented on the limited plot notably with Hooked Games stating "Story-telling and depth are lacking.", Gamer.no stating "It's a game with combat and little else.", and PC PowerPlay finding it "Devoid of plot".
