= Blood Bowl 2 =

2015 video game

- Developer: Cyanide
- Publisher: Focus Home Interactive
- Director: Gauthier Brunet
- Programmer: Aurélien Caussin
- Artists: Thomas Veauclin; Christophe Live Tha Kine
- Writer: Andy Hall
- Series: Blood Bowl
- Engine: Gamebryo
- Platforms: PlayStation 4; Windows; Xbox One; OS X
- Release: PlayStation 4, Windows, Xbox One; 22 September 2015; OS X; 18 May 2016
- Genres: Sports, turn-based strategy
- Modes: Single-player, multiplayer

Blood Bowl 2 is a turn-based fantasy sports video game developed by Cyanide Studios and published by Focus Home Interactive. It is a sequel to the 2009 video game Blood Bowl, based on the board game by Games Workshop. The game was developed for Windows, PlayStation 4, and Xbox One, and was released on 22 September 2015. A OS X version of the game was launched in May 2016.

The game uses a new engine and removes the real-time mode found in the previous game, making the game purely turn-based. It also introduces the Bretonnian as a new playable race, which was developed out of a fan-developed rulebook. The game features both a solo campaign and a multiplayer mode, with the solo campaign featuring the human team, the Reikland Reavers. Initially eight races are playable, but additional races were available as preorder bonus and downloadable content, in addition to the Legendary Edition.

A sequel, Blood Bowl 3 was released in February 2023.

== Gameplay ==
Several new and improved features have been added since the first Blood Bowl game. These new features include the new Campaign mode, Stadium Customization, Cabalvision, and the Player Marketplace.

Campaign Mode

In Campaign Mode, the player follows the story of the Reikland Reavers, a team in disgrace. It is the player's job, as the team's coach, to raise them back to their former glory. Beyond the standard game play that can be found in League and Multiplayer modes, Campaign Mode includes a number of scripted, one-time events, such as a goblin crashing a helicopter in the middle of the field. When these events occur, the player has to continue to play around them.

Stadium customization

The base game includes five stadiums for customization. These are stadiums that originate with the Human, Orc, Dwarf, Dark Elf and Skaven. As players grow their teams, they can also grow their stadium. The stadium can be raised through four tiers, excluding 10 add-ons, for a total of 20 unique stadium designs.

Cabalvision

Cabalvision is Blood Bowl 2's version of sports commentary. Play-by-play announcer (and immortal vampire) Jim Johnson injects his witty commentary alongside analyst Bob Bifford's forthright preference to sheer violence, providing the player with a colourful commentary based on the teams, players, and the action happening on the field.

Player marketplace

Because of the brutal nature of Blood Bowl, teams will often have to find more players to field—due to death, injury, or retirement—or to make some extra money. One way to do this is through the Player Marketplace. The Player Marketplace allows players to be both bought and sold from other coaches (both AI and Human).

=== Races ===
Eight races are included in the Blood Bowl 2 base game. These are the Humans, Orcs, Dwarfs, Skaven, High Elves, Dark Elves, Bretonnians, and Chaos. There are also two races that were originally available as pre-order bonus, but have since been made available to all as DLC. The Wood Elves can be obtained by pre-ordering the game for Xbox One, and the Lizardmen can be obtained by pre-ordering the game for the PlayStation 4. If the game was pre-ordered through Steam, both races are available.

On December 17, 2015, Cyanide announced that they would be adding four new races into the game, starting from the Norse (released in May 2016), followed by Undead (released in July 2016), Necromantic (released in September 2016), and Nurgle (released in November 2016). Players who purchased Blood Bowl 2 on Steam before the release of these races received them for free as they were gradually rolled out. In February 2017, two new playable races - Chaos Dwarfs and Khemri - were released as DLC.

The Official Expansion added seven returning races and introduced one new race to the game, namely Halflings, Ogres, Goblins, Vampires, Amazon, Elven Union, Underworld, and Kislev Circus.

== Reception ==
Reception

Aggregate score
Aggregator	Score
Metacritic	PC: 76/100; PS4: 72/100; XONE: 70/100

Review scores
Publication	Score
GameSpot	8/10
IGN	7.8/10
PlayStation Official Magazine – UK	6/10
Official Xbox Magazine (UK)	7/10
PC Gamer (US)	60/100

Blood Bowl 2 received "generally favorable" reviews for Windows and "mixed or average" reviews for PlayStation 4 and Xbox One, according to review aggregator Metacritic. PC Gamer awarded it a 60%, saying "Blood Bowl 2 is the flashiest iteration of the game so far, but its dice rolls are frustrating, and its ample ruleset isn't introduced well to newcomers." IGN awarded it 7.8 out of 10, saying "Blood Bowl 2 is a smashy, satisfying, goofy tactical melee that leaves just a bit too much up to the six-sided dice." GameSpot awarded it a score of 8 out of 10, saying "Yet overall, Blood Bowl 2 is a step forward. It's a much friendlier, easier game than its predecessors, with improved looks, a tutorial campaign, controller support, and the UI improvements. New players won't feel blocked off from enjoying it."
