= Of Orcs and Men =

2012 video game

- Developers: Cyanide; Spiders
- Publisher: Focus Home Interactive
- Composer: Olivier Deriviere
- Platforms: Microsoft Windows; PlayStation 3 Xbox 360
- Release: WW: 11 October 2012
- Genre: Action role-playing
- Mode: Single-player

Of Orcs and Men is a fantasy action role-playing game developed by Cyanide and Spiders for PlayStation 3, Xbox 360 and PC. The Empire of Men's oppressive threat looms over the territories of the Orcs and the Goblins. Goblins are systematically persecuted and slaughtered, while Orcs not killed in battle are captured and enslaved.

Three prequels, titled Styx: Master of Shadows (2014), Styx: Shards of Darkness (2017), and Styx: Blades of Greed (2026) came out with Styx the goblin as the main protagonist.

== Plot ==
Of Orcs and Men puts the player into the role of an elite Orc soldier, Arkail, from the legendary legion known as the Bloodjaws. The legion is a league of warriors deeply involved in the war between the Orcs and the Goblins on one side and their persecutors, Humankind, on the other. As a veteran warrior who has seen the most brutal of battles, the player is appointed by the Bloodjaw commander to complete a mission that could change the course of the war, to kill the Emperor himself, the man responsible for the bloodshed. A sentient and sly Goblin, Styx, soon joins the player, an unlikely but indispensable ally.

Arkail and Styx travel throughout the empire where many Orcs have been enslaved or have turned traitor and joined the empire on its campaign of destroying all greenskins. Eventually, they both encounter Arkail's father who has been aiding the resistance and planning to rescue Arkence, a sorceress who is the only one capable of getting Arkail and Styx to the island of Laments, where the emperor has been occupied with political matters. Arkail and Styx round up a rag tag team of Orcs and assault the prison where Arkence has been holding out. They kill many guards along the way and rescue Arkence but at the cost of many Orcs lives and escape the prison to sail off to the island of Laments.

Arkail and Styx finally make it to the island and dispose of the soldiers who guard the island palace where Arkail locates and either kills the emperor or watches as the emperor is killed by Barimen, a supporter of the resistance who in reality wanted Arkail to kill the emperor so he could ascend to the throne while securing the aid of the Elves and Dwarves in carrying out the greenskin genocide. The two manage to escape the island, but now find themselves facing the full might of the empire and its new allies.

Arkail and Styx return to the wall and plan to destroy the palace with explosives and kill Barimen with the support of Arkail's father, Arkence, and the Orcs and Mages who defected from the empire. The duo assault the palace personally, fighting through soldiers and traitor Orcs before reaching the throne room. Arkail then kills Barimen and the Grand Inquisitor who has been chasing him and Styx throughout their journey. The palace crumbles as the bombs are set off and thousands of Orcs escape the wall and head to the Orc occupied regions to live freely. Even though the empire has gained new allies and are determined to retaliate, the Orcs have a better chance of winning the war and Arkail and Styx are now hopeful that the future will turn out better for them and all those who have been oppressed by the empire.

== Gameplay ==
Taking advantage of their natural traits, the two characters have their own skill trees to develop. While the Orc focuses on power, reflecting his incredible strength, the Goblin will benefit from darker powers and stealth abilities, making him the perfect assassin.

== Reception ==
Reception

Aggregate score
Aggregator	Score
Metacritic	(PC) 69/100 (PS3) 57/100 (X360) 64/100

Review scores
Publication	Score
Destructoid	(PC) 8/10
Eurogamer	(X360) 8/10
GameSpot	(PC) 7/10
RPGamer	(PS3) 2.0/5
DigitallyDownloaded	(PS3) 3.5/5

The game received "mixed or average" reviews across platforms on Metacritic.
