= Blood Bowl (2009 video game) =

- Developer: Cyanide
- Publisher: Focus Home Interactive
- Director: Antoine Villepreux
- Designer: Régis Robin
- Programmers: Antoine Villepreux; Arnaud Chapalain
- Artists: Faouzi Hamida; Christophe Live Tha Kine; Thomas Veauclin
- Series: Blood Bowl
- Engine: Gamebryo
- Platforms: Microsoft Windows; Nintendo DS; PlayStation Portable; Xbox 360; Android iOS
- Release: June 26, 2009: Microsoft Windows; WW: June 26, 2009 (digital); FR/SP/GER: June 26, 2009 (retail); AUS: October 22, 2009 (retail) Nintendo DS; EU: September 18, 2009; AU: October 22, 2009 PlayStation Portable; EU: September 18, 2009; AU: October 22, 2009; NA: April 13, 2010 Xbox 360; UK: November 27, 2009; AU: December 10, 2009; NA: January 26, 2010 iOS/Android; WW: July 31, 2014 Legendary Edition Microsoft Windows; AU: October 26, 2010; NA: October 28, 2010; UK: October 29, 2010
- Genres: Sports, real-time strategy, turn-based strategy
- Modes: Single-player, multiplayer

Blood Bowl is a 2009 fantasy sports video game developed by Cyanide, loosely based on gridiron football, and adapted from the board game of the same name, which is produced by Games Workshop, using the CRP ruleset. It was released for Microsoft Windows, Xbox 360, Nintendo DS, PlayStation Portable, iOS, and Android.

== Gameplay ==
The game is a fantasy version of American football, played between two teams of up to 16 players, each team fielding up to 11 players at a time. Touchdowns are scored by taking the ball into the opposition's end zone, and a team can win either by scoring the most touchdowns, or by violently eliminating the other team's entire roster. The game has both real-time and turn-based strategy modes. Players may choose to play the game in either mode. The Special Play cards are not included in the main game.

During the main career mode, the player must start from scratch and build a team; the career mode can go on ad infinitum. As the team goes up in ranking on the tournament ladder, a player will sign better players for their roster. If one or several of the roster players are injured or killed during a match, the player needs to replace them for one or several of the next matches until they are ready to go back to the field. If the player lacks money to heal them, they will still be able to play the injured player, but the chances that player is killed increases.

Roster players take part in tournaments, where they gain experience and level up. The player can assign skill points to buy new abilities that will affect the player's performance, such as improving their dice rolls, have a second chance on a bad roll, and other bonuses along those lines. Leagues are completely customizable: there are 25 elements that can be edited by the user, such as teams, races, players, and championship rules. Players may also set up online tournaments with others in the online community, which also allows players to gain experience as with the single player mode. Tournaments may have a minimum of four participants, and a maximum of 24; none of the teams may be AI-controlled. A player may play with a solo franchise team online, but may not use it in online tournaments or leagues. Players may not switch between RTS and turn-based modes mid-tournament. Players may create custom logos for their teams.

The Nintendo DS and PlayStation Portable versions lack career league play and customization options. Multiplayer involves turn-based hotseat gameplay on the handheld versions, though the PSP version also includes wireless multiplayer.
The first release on both DS and PSP showed significant functional issues that prevented players to complete career mode as their data files were corrupted after a few hours of game play. A replacement service has since been provided to owners of the PSP version. The Xbox 360 version also suffered issues, such as in-game players not keeping experience they gained during games, making league play useless. The Xbox 360 version was also dropped after the original version of the game.

== Expansions ==
French DS version

In October 2009, Cyanide Studios announced a free expansion containing the Dark Elves race. The update was released on November 20, 2009 as a free download and as an in-store release in Europe with a strategy guide. Downloadable content featuring Dark Elves was released along with a title update for Xbox 360, but, while free on the PC, Microsoft chose to charge players for them on the Xbox 360. Despite being approved in North America, the Xbox 360 title update was not approved in the EMEA territories.

In April 2010, Cyanide announced an updated version of the game, Blood Bowl: Legendary Edition would be released in November 2010, with 11 new teams (Amazon, Elf, Halfling, High Elf, Khemri, Necromantic, Norse, Nurgle, Ogre, Undead, and Vampire), and added bug and rules fixes. BB:LE is based on the current CRP rule set, and contains 21 of the 24 BBRC (Blood Bowl Rules Committee) official rosters. The missing races are the Chaos Dwarfs, Chaos Pact and Slann.

In May 2012, Cyanide and Focus announced the next version of the game, Blood Bowl: Chaos Edition would be released, with 3 new teams (2 from the rules - Chaos Dwarves and Underworld, and a third made completely up by them - Daemons of Khorne), 2 additional star players and a new stadium, with the Chaos Pact and Slann being left out of this release. Cyanide Studios also released an adaptation of Dungeonbowl in the same year.

A sequel, Blood Bowl 2, was released in September 2015. A second sequel, Blood Bowl 3, was announced in August 2020 and was released on 23 February 2023.

== Development ==
Two players engaging in battle

Cyanide created a similar title, Chaos League, in 2004. The similarity between Chaos League and Games Workshop's Blood Bowl led to a lawsuit, which was settled out of court. One of the terms of the settlement was that Cyanide would receive a license to develop a new title using the official Blood Bowl property.

In August 2007, Cyanide announced that a new game for Microsoft Windows computers would be developed, due to be released in 2008. On November 14, 2007, the Nintendo DS, PlayStation Portable, and Xbox 360 versions were announced. It was originally believed the game would be on Xbox Live Arcade, but it was revealed to be a store release title. A limited playable version of the game was demonstrated at the Blood Bowl Grand Tournament in Nottingham over the weekend of the May 10, 2008. On December 18, 2008 it was announced on the Cyanide Blood Bowl forum by a Focus employee that the release date had been pushed back to Q2 2009 (June). The PC version was made available for digital download on June 26, 2009.

On June 25, 2008, a trailer was released featuring the opening cinematic and some gameplay.

Cyanide Studios received permission from Games Workshop to include a real-time mode in the game, providing the developer strictly adhered to the Living Rulebook 5.0's rules; it was Cyanide's success with Chaos League that gave Games Workshop the confidence to allow them to adapt the rules to real-time gameplay.

=== Digital rights management ===
The PC version of Blood Bowl has SecuROM digital rights management technology. SecuROM exists in both the DVD retail box release and the digital download releases, including digital download distributions from both Steam and Impulse content delivery services. An activation code is provided with the game, and there is a specific uninstallation program installed which can be used to revoke the licence for further use.

== Reception ==
Reception

Aggregate score
Aggregator	Score
Metacritic	PC: 72/100; DS: 52/100; PSP: 61/100; X360: 61/100 iOS: 62/100; Legendary Edition (PC): 73/100

Review scores
Publication	Score
Eurogamer	6/10
Game Informer	7.75/10
GameSpot	(PC) 7/10 (X360) 5.5/10
GamesRadar+	3.5/5
GameZone	6.5/10
IGN	6.4/10
Pocket Gamer	(iOS) 3.5/5
TouchArcade	(iOS) 2.5/5

Blood Bowl received "mixed or average" reviews according to review aggregator Metacritic, with the Windows version faring better than the rest. The DS version garnered the most negative reception.

GameZone's Steven Hopper gave the Xbox 360 version a 6.5/10, saying, "Blood Bowl is a missed opportunity as evidenced by the potential of the source on which it's based. If you really want to get into the depth and fun of Blood Bowl, you're better off checking out the board game." IT Reviews pointed out that on the Xbox 360, Blood Bowl had a "flaccid and pointless-seeming real-time mode, rough presentation, [and] a lack of online options compared to the PC." While reviewing the Windows version, PC Powerplay commented, "Despite some presentation concerns the rest of what was on offer during this match was truly thrilling." PC Gamer wrote similarly, concluding, "If you can penetrate the mysteries of its boardgame-based rules, Blood Bowl can offer true barbaric happiness."
