= Tour de France (2011 video game) =

2011 video game

Pro Cycling Manager 2011
- Developer(s): Cyanide
- Publisher(s): Focus Entertainment
- Series: Tour de France
- Platform(s): PlayStation 3, Xbox 360
- Release: July 1, 2011
- Genre(s): Sports
- Mode(s): Single-player

Le Tour de France is a 2011 sports game developed by the French studio Cyanide and published by Focus Entertainment. It is the second installment in the Tour de France video game series, and it was released on July 1, 2011, for the PlayStation 3 and Xbox 360.

== Gameplay and release ==
In the game, the player controls a cyclist through 21 stages.

The game was released in Europe for the PlayStation 3 and Xbox 360 on July 1, 2011.

== Reception ==
On Metacritic, the game has a score of 54 for the PlayStation 3 version and a 46 for the Xbox 360 version.
