= Cities XL 2012 =

2011 video game

- Developer(s): Focus Home Interactive
- Publisher(s): Focus Home Interactive
- Series: Cities XL
- Platform(s): Microsoft Windows
- Release: October 20, 2011
- Genre(s): City simulator
- Mode(s): Single-player

Cities XL 2012 is a city simulator developed by Focus Home Interactive. Cities XL 2012 is the third game in the Cities XL franchise. The game focuses on a single-player mode, and was released on October 20, 2011. New features include new structures, new maps and a starter guide; additionally, the game has been opened to modding and allows players to share their mods. It is fully compatible with Cities XL 2011 version with a discounted upgrade available. An expansion pack was released simultaneously.

== Development ==
The game was officially announced by Focus Home Interactive on July 13, 2011. Cities XL first released on October 8–9, 2009, with the following Cities XL 2011 released on October 14, 2010, then Cities XL 2012 on October 20, 2011. The game was developed by Focus Home Interactive and originally published by Monte Cristo.

== Reception ==
Cities XL 2012 received mixed reviews from various critics. It currently has a rating of 61/100 on Metacritic.
