= Tour de France 2013: 100 Edition =

2013 video game

- Developer: Cyanide
- Publisher: Focus Home Interactive
- Series: Tour de France series
- Platforms: PlayStation 3, Xbox 360
- Release: 2013
- Mode: Single-player

Tour de France 2013: 100 Edition is a video game developed by Cyanide, the creators of Pro Cycling Manager, and published by Focus Home Interactive.

The game is based on the 2013 Tour de France, which is the 100th edition of the race.

Like the earlier game, it's possible to play online and as in the real Tour de France, the final stage takes place at dusk.

== Reception ==
Reception

Review scores
Publication	Score
Multiplayer.it	6/10
Eurogamer Italy	5/10
Jeuxvideo	13/20
