= Blood Bowl 3 =

2023 video game

- Developer: Cyanide
- Publisher: Nacon
- Director: Jérémie Monedero
- Designer: Basile Bastian
- Programmer: Colas "Cø" Markowski
- Artists: Jean Bey; Tristan Marodon
- Writer: Pia Jacqmart
- Composer: Arnaud Galand
- Series: Blood Bowl
- Engine: Unreal Engine 4
- Platforms: PlayStation 4 PlayStation 5 Windows; Xbox One; Xbox Series X/S; Nintendo Switch
- Release: PlayStation 4, PlayStation 5, Windows, Xbox One, Xbox Series X/S: WW: 23 February 2023; Nintendo Switch: WW: TBA
- Genres: Sports, turn-based strategy
- Modes: Single-player, multiplayer

Blood Bowl 3 is a turn-based fantasy sports video game developed by Cyanide Studios and published by Nacon. It is a sequel to the 2015 video game Blood Bowl 2, based on the Blood Bowl board game by Games Workshop and is the third Blood Bowl game created by Cyanide. The game was released on 23 February 2023 for PlayStation 4, PlayStation 5, Windows, Xbox One and Xbox Series X/S, with a Nintendo Switch port planned to be released at a later date.

The game uses the newly updated Second Season ruleset. It contains a single-player campaign as well as multiplayer.

The game was announced in August 2020 but had numerous delays and postponement to its release date. The launch was met with criticism over the new monetisation system introduced into the game, bugs and crashes, poor AI, readability, as well as server issues and a lack of tools and features present in the previous game.

== Gameplay ==
A screenshot of an Orc versus Human match

The game is a fantasy version of gridiron football, played between two teams made up from various races from the Warhammer Fantasy setting. Each team can have a maximum of 16 players with each team fielding up to 11 players per drive. Touchdowns are scored by taking the ball into the opposition's end zone. Players may attempt to injure, maim or kill the opposition in order to make scoring easier by reducing the number of enemy players on the field.

The game is turn based and features strict two minute timed turns as well as a time bank of seven and a half minutes which players can use if they need extra time on a particular turn. Players perform various actions such as fouling a prone player, passing the ball or hitting another opposing player by rolling dice to succeed, certain failures can lead to a turnover ending a teams turn.

Players have various stats and skills that impact how good they are at certain actions or giving them special abilities. Players can earn experience, known in game as 'Star Player Points', which can be spent to gain new skills or boost their stats. There are also various special rules such as certain players bringing chainsaws onto the field or the ability to bribe the referee to stop them sending a player off the pitch.

The game contains a new feature for the Blood Bowl series in that it introduces a battle pass system called "Blood Pass" which take place over three month long seasons and allow players to unlock cosmetics (such as dice, armour and balls). On completion of the pass a new faction is unlocked to play with. Players can also pay for the Blood Pass at the start of a season to instantly unlock the reward faction and also additional rewards as players progress through the tiers but these cosmetic items do not have any bearing on the actual gameplay. An in-game currency called Warpstone, which is earned by playing games or can be bought as a microtransaction, can be used to buy cosmetics such as helmets, skins or shoulder pads. Cosmetic items are split into different tiers of rarity; common, rare, epic and legendary, the latter of which is single-use.

The single player campaign is called the Clash of Sponsors and sees players choose a team from one of the 12 factions to play for a sponsor with different perks and bonuses and beat bosses in the form of another team with a super star player.

== Development ==
Cyanide had created the previous two Blood Bowl video games: Blood Bowl (released 2009) and Blood Bowl 2 (released 2015). They had gained the license to create the games following an out of court settlement with Games Workshop over similarities between Blood Bowl and Cyanide's 2004 game Chaos League.

In 2016, Games Workshop began supporting and releasing miniatures for the Blood Bowl board game after a 22 year hiatus. On 27 November 2020, they released a new ruleset called Blood Bowl Second Season Edition which saw new rosters and rules introduced to the game. This meant that Blood Bowl 2 was outdated and using old rules and as such Blood Bowl 3 would have to allow players to play the newly updated and current version of the game. Along with that Blood Bowl 2 was difficult to update with the new rules and so it was necessary to build a new game from scratch while moving to Unreal Engine for better graphics. Blood Bowl 3 had already entered development in 2018 on the old rules and so needed to be changed to comply with the new ones.

Blood Bowl 3 was announced in August 2020 during Gamescom 2020 with a release in 'early 2021'. This proved too optimistic and in February 2021 the game was pushed to a release in August. In June the August release date was further pushed back to February 2022. The delay announcement was accompanied with a trailer showcasing the games campaign. A closed beta was run between the 3 and 13 June 2021 which required registering for. There was to be an early access release for PC in September 2021 but Cyanide announced an "indefinite delay". In November 2021, Nacon announced that the February 2022 release date was being further postponed due to delays caused by the COVID-19 pandemic and that the game would be released "later in 2022". Project manager Gautier Brésard addressed the delays by explaining that alongside the pandemic, Cyanide had been overly optimistic on the time scale needed to build the game from the ground up saying “We thought that we would be quicker since we’ve done it twice already. But actually it's still quite a lot of work, and having done it before doesn't make it go that much faster.”

In January 2022, Nacon announced that the game would no longer have an early access release as originally planned and would instead run another closed beta from 25 January to 2 February with a final full release on PC and consoles later in the year. Only players who had registered for the June 2021 closed beta had access. Another beta was held for PC between the 1 and 12 June 2022. Brésard stated that the beta tests had provided good player feedback which had inadvertently extended the development time of the game as Cyanide implemented the feedback on areas such as the user interface which players found too cluttered and the games colours which had to be toned down after some players complained of headaches.

In November 2022, Nacon announced that the game would release on 23 February 2023 on all platforms except Nintendo Switch. The delay for the Switch release was due to the Switch's smaller screen which meant that the UI had to be tailored specifically to the platform.

A new gameplay trailer was shown at The Game Awards 2022. An overview trailer was released in early February to highlight differences with previous games and new features.

2 minute turns, compared to 4 minute turns in Blood Bowl 2, and the 7 and a half minute time bank were introduced in an attempt to speed the game up and to cut down the length of matches which could be over 1.5 to 2 hours in Blood Bowl 2 and was seen as a turn off for many new players. Brésard said "[our] goal was to reduce the time per match to around one hour."

A worry during development was the notion of 'runaway leaders' in the multiplayer setting which refers to the idea that teams that are highly developed and skilled can monopolise the multiplayer format. It was a problem in Blood Bowl 2 which was addressed by periodically wiping all teams and forcing players to start from new. Due to the introduction of three month long seasons and the new way players level up and gain new skills in this edition of the game it allows coaches even more freedom and time to develop highly skilled teams. Brésard said that the problem of runaway leaders "may be more prevalent in Blood Bowl III". The board game addresses this problem by forcing teams to 'redraft' after each season and making players that are kept on between seasons more expensive and it was initially decided that this would be the system used in Blood Bowl 3 but that after the first season it would be reviewed to make sure "it's suited to the Blood Bowl III digital environment" or if another solution is necessary.

Cyanide worked closely with Games Workshop in the design process with a licensing manager attached to the project to ensure the design and creative work was compliant with Games Workshop. Everything had to be approved by Games Worksop and Cyanide made effort to follow the existing board game miniatures and style wherever possible as well as taking inspiration from the official artwork. In areas where there was no artwork or miniature to copy they had to create original content, such as with the cheerleaders, to then be approved by Games Workshop. Owen Rees, head of video game licensing at Games Workshop praised Cyanide as "their knowledge and passion for Blood Bowl is phenomenal" and that "outside of Games Workshop they are probably the foremost experts on the game".

Brésard said that the game may also receive more content that is featured in the Games Workshop magazines White Dwarf and Spike! Magazine such as special play cards and race specific wizards, features that aren't in the game at launch.

A change from Blood Bowl 2 is the tutorial and how new players are taught the game because "Blood Bowl is a very complex game, very hard to get into." It was felt the tutorial in Blood Bowl 2 was overly long and so an aim with this game was to compress the tutorial down to 45 to 60 minutes and teach the 'basic tools' to play the game. Another change with the previous game is that Blood Bowl 3 contains a formation editor which players can use outside of games to create formations which can be quickly accessed in matches. The campaign focus was to make it less linear than the previous game, increase replayability, and include the ability to play as any faction as opposed to only humans. Saul Jephcott and David Gasman reprise their roles from the previous game as the match commentators Jim and Bob respectively.

In September 2025 Games Workshop announced a new edition of the board game Blood Bowl that was released in November. Cyanide confirmed that Blood Bowl 3 would be updated in 2026 with the new ruleset.

== Release ==
The game was released on 23 February 2023 for PlayStation 4, PlayStation 5, Windows, Xbox One and Xbox Series X/S with the Nintendo Switch version to be released later in 2023. The game featured 12 races to play on release with more to be added. The races at release were; Black Orcs, Chaos Chosen, Chaos Renegades, Dark Elf, Dwarfs, Elven Union, Humans, Imperial Nobility, Nurgle, Old World Alliance, Orcs and Skaven. The game had 4 pre-order editions, the basic being the 'Standard Edition' which came with 3 extra team logos and a dice set as a bonus. Two race specific 'Deluxe Editions', one for Black Orcs and the other for Imperial Nobility, were available with bonus extra cosmetic gear for the players of each specific race and also an extra ball and dice. The 'Brutal Edition' contained all of the above but also included a 48 hour early access from the 21 February, extra cheerleader cosmetics and 1000 warpstone (the in-game currency). Many customers had problems with cosmetics not rendering correctly or disappearing and some players who bought the standard edition of the game were given customisation options from higher tier editions which Cyanide announced would be addressed. Cyanide acknowledged that all editions gained the 1000 warpstone and cosmetic bonuses that should have only applied to Brutal Edition. It was decided that while the warpstone would not be taken off gamers, the bonus cosmetics would. In addition, Brutal Edition buyers would gain an additional 1000, and those who played during the early access launch a further 250 warpstone.

Administrators of numerous private multiplayer leagues on Blood Bowl 2, including the Reddit run REBBL, signed an open letter to Cyanide and to Nacon, highlighting that many features used to create and run private leagues present in Blood Bowl 2 were not present in Blood Bowl 3 and were not in the roadmap of post launch development. The letter stated that without these tools it would “severely hamper the potential we all see in BB3” and diminish the player base and that these player run leagues would not move on to the new game until the issues were addressed. Cyanide responded to the letter saying that the tools would be available in a couple of weeks. Admin tools in beta were released to the public 48 weeks later.

In mid-March a patch was released for the game to address the criticism around monetisation and customisation. Previously, cosmetics were single use but this was changed to allow all items that aren't Legendary to be used multiple times.

The first season and Blood Pass were released on 22 June alongside a new faction, Lizardmen, which was released for free. This provided for online competitive play and also added new tools for admins of private leagues. The second season, alongside the Underworld faction, was released in September 2023. Third season came with the Shambling Undead team in December 2023. The fourth season and the Wood Elves team were released in March 2024. Fifth season and the Necromantic Horrors team were released in June 2024. The fifth season release also saw the addition of the much wanted cross-platform play. The Halfling team and the Goblin team came with the sixth season in September 2024. The Norse team were added in December followed by the Amazon team in March 2025. The Khorne team was released in June with Vampires following next for Season 10 in September. Season 11 was released in December alongside the Chaos Dwarf faction.

== Reception ==
Reception

Aggregate scores
Aggregator	Score
Metacritic	PC: 60/100; PS5: 56/100; XSX: 51/100
OpenCritic	31% recommend

Review scores
Publication	Score
IGN	5/10
NME	1/5
Softpedia	4/5
TheGamer	3/5
Wargamer	7/10
Gamereactor	4/10

Blood Bowl 3 received "mixed or average reviews" according to review aggregator Metacritic, based on 25 reviews for Windows. OpenCritic determined that 31% of critics recommend the game. Robin Valentine writing for PC Gamer criticised the microtransactions within the game along with the numerous bugs that were present during the review period just before release. The UI was described as 'messy' and 'awkward' and he found the players hard to differentiate. He went on to predict the game would have a 'disastrous launch' due to it being 'fundamentally unfinished'. Timothy Linward at Wargamer praised the core game and also the graphics as an improvement on its predecessor but found it hard to follow what was happening in the game or differentiate the player models on some teams. He also had problems with bugs and the AI of the game in single-player. Wargamer also criticised the early access due to the bugs, crashes and server issues at release with Cyanide coming out in a statement to say they were dealing with the problems and blamed the large volume of players overwhelming the servers. Wargamer also later conceded that the game they had reviewed was not representative of the one that was released. TheGamer praised the variety of cosmetic upgrades, the tournament management options and the core game but had doubts over the microtransaction and live-service direction of the game.

Jake Tucker in NME said that the game was "Bug-infested and content-light" and that it shouldn't have launched in such a poor condition. NME also collected fan reviews which criticised the microtransactions and the poor launch. Andrei Dumitrescu for Softpedia gave the game a positive review praising the customisation and tournament options but also pointing out the technical issues the game faced at launch. IGN couldn't find any reason to recommend the game over its predecessor describing it as "a sloppy, muddy, buggy rehash of a better game".

In the week of its release users on Steam had reviewed the game as 'mostly negative' due to the launch issues, monetisation, poor AI and bugs/crashes. Cyanide apologised for the poor launch and responded to the criticism around its monetisation system by saying they would make it fair, rewarding and optional.

Jody Macgregor in PC Gamer ranked Blood Bowl 3 21st out of 30 in a list of the best ever Warhammer Fantasy video games, beaten by both its prequels; the 2009 Blood Bowl in 12th and Blood Bowl 2 in 6th. He described the issues in the game as "galling because it's still quite fun when it works" but that the lack of basic features mean "it's impossible to keep faith in".
