= Loki (video game) =

2007 video game

- Developer(s): Cyanide
- Publisher(s): EU: Focus Home Interactive; NA: DreamCatcher Interactive
- Programmer(s)
- Engine: Gamebryo
- Platform(s): Windows
- Release: FRA: June 12, 2007; EU: August 24, 2007; NA: October 2, 2007
- Genre(s): Action role-playing
- Mode(s): Single-player

Loki (titled Loki: Heroes of Mythology in North America) is an action role-playing video game developed by Cyanide and released for Microsoft Windows in June 2007. The game combines Aztec, Egyptian, Greek and Norse mythologies and allows the player to take on the role of a hero, each drawn from one of the four different mythologies.

The hero is plunged into the chaos brought about by Seth, the Egyptian god of chaos and the desert. The hero must pass through each mythology in pursuit of Seth before reaching the game's final showdown.

== Gameplay ==
Following the influence of Diablo and Diablo II, Loki is a speedy action-oriented RPG. The players can create their playable character choosing between a male or female warrior and mage characters from the Norse, Greek, Egyptian and Aztec mythologies and take part in four different campaigns that can be played solo or with up to six players.

Quests themselves are varied and drawn from specific myths. Regardless of the player's goal in Loki, the gameplay path will always be slaughtering horde of monsters through deserts, caves, volcanoes and jungles. Besides following the Diablo template, Loki still manages to mostly pull it off by sticking to the featuring an extreme difficulty even on the easiest "mortal" game setting, resulting in players respawning at the beginning of levels and areas multiple times before they actually conquer their enemies in battle.

== Reception ==
=== Critical response ===
Reception

Aggregate score
Aggregator	Score
Metacritic	PC: 61/100

Review scores
Publication	Score
GameSpot	7/10
GameZone	7.7/10
IGN	6/10

The reviews were mediocre at the time, scoring an average score of 61/100 according to review aggregator Metacritic. Reviews pointed out technical issues with the game's engine struggling sometimes to render the combination of dozens of enemies on the screen. The comparisons to Diablo were heavy. The game was praised for its gameplay loop, but most reviews criticized the lack of innovation for a game of that year.

IGN review praised the game's presentation, "The graphics and sound add to the game, rather than take your attention away with a goofy voice or crummy animation", but pointed out that the game's online experience was not fully functioning at launch with some patch problems.
