= Cities XXL =

2015 city-building video game

- Developer: Focus Home Interactive
- Publisher: Focus Home Interactive
- Series: Cities XL
- Platform: Microsoft Windows
- Release: NA: February 5, 2015; PAL: February 12, 2015
- Genre: City-building game
- Mode: Single-player

Cities XXL is a city-building computer game developed by Focus Home Interactive as a sequel to their earlier game Cities XL Platinum. The game allows players to design, build, and manage cities.

== Gameplay ==
=== Zoning ===
The game offers the designation of three types of building lots: residential, commercial and industrial. Each of which can have a different density. Residential lots have four social classes: unskilled workers, skilled workers, executives, and elites. Before designating building lots, the game requires players to select which class of residents may live there. The social class chosen for a lot will not be modified by the simulation.

To create building lots, players can zone an area of the map in which, upon confirmation, individual building lots will be created by the game. Players can also plop building lots individually.

=== Transport ===
Cities XXL allows players to create a road network of a variety of road types at many different angles and curvatures. Bridges and tunnels are also part of the simulator. Other transport options are buses, trains, ferries, and subways.

== Reception ==
Reception

Aggregate score
Aggregator	Score
Metacritic	47/100

Review scores
Publication	Score
4Players	45%
GameStar	56%
Jeuxvideo.com	10/20
MeriStation	5/10
PC Games (DE)	64%
PCGamesN	3/10

Cities XXL received "generally unfavorable reviews" according to the review aggregation website Metacritic. Many of the reviews were negative due to lack of new content, and poor multithreading support, which was a selling point of the game.

== See also ==
- City Life
