= Dungeon Party =

2009 video game

- Developer: Cyanide Studio
- Publisher: Focus Home Interactive
- Platform: Microsoft Windows
- Genre: massively multiplayer online role-playing game
- Mode: Multiplayer

Dungeon Party is a 3D massively multiplayer online role-playing game developed by Cyanide Studio. The game was released May 15, 2009, globally.

Dungeon Party is a team-based online game. Players can create characters of a different number of classes and take part in dungeon raids. The objective of these raids is to obtain the treasure and get to the exit of the dungeon. Two teams compete against each other for this objective. Each Dungeon contains numerous traps and dungeon guardians which either aid or hamper a team's efforts.
