= Cyanide (company) =

French video game developer

Cyanide SA
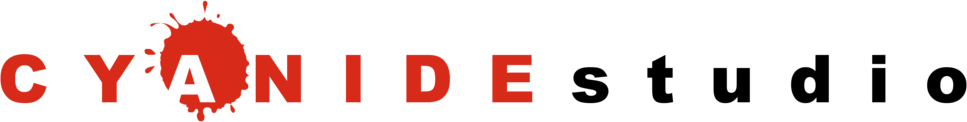
- Company type: Subsidiary
- Industry: Video games
- Founded: 2000; 26 years ago
- Founder: Patrick Pligersdorffer
- Headquarters: Nanterre, France
- Key people: Patrick Pligersdorffer (CEO)
- Products: Pro Cycling Manager; Blood Bowl; Of Orcs and Men
- Number of employees: 110 (2018)
- Parent: Nacon (2018–present)
- Subsidiaries: Amusement Cyanide Inc. Big Bad Wolf; Rogue Factor
- Website: cyanide-studio.com

Cyanide SA (also known as Cyanide Studio) is a French video game developer based in the Nanterre suburb of Paris. The company was founded in 2000 by Patrick Pligersdorffer, formerly of Ubi Soft. Since 2007, Cyanide operates a second studio, Amusement Cyanide, in Montreal, Canada, and employs a total of 110 staff members as of 2018. Cyanide was acquired by French publisher Bigben Interactive (now Nacon) in May 2018.

Big Bad Wolf, founded in 2015 at Bordeaux, and Rogue Factor, founded in 2013 at Montréal, are branches of Cyanide.

== History ==
Before founding Cyanide, Patrick Pligersdorffer began working in the video game industry with Ubi Soft, where he assisted the opening of an internal development studio in Japan. After leaving Ubi Soft, Pligersdorffer established Cyanide in Nanterre in 2000. In November 2007, Cyanide announced that they had set up a new studio in Montreal, Canada. At the time, the new studio, known as Amusement Cyanide, was tasked with creating a new proprietary 3D animation engine for a game that was in development at Cyanide's headquarters. On 14 May 2018, French publisher Bigben Interactive (now Nacon) announced that it had wholly acquired Cyanide for a total sum of €20 million. By this time, Cyanide employed 110 people in its two studios. Focus Home Interactive, Cyanide's primary publisher, previously also attempted to take over the studio, but the move was rejected by the publisher's supervisory board, which eventually led to the resignation of Focus Home Interactive's chief executive officer, Cédric Lagarrigue.

== Developed titles ==
=== Games by Cyanide ===
| Year | Title | Platform(s) | Publisher |
|---|---|---|---|
| 2001 | Cycling Manager | Windows | Focus Home Interactive |
| 2002 | Cycling Manager 2 | Windows | Focus Home Interactive |
| 2003 | Cycling Manager 3 | Windows | Focus Home Interactive |
| 2003 | Final Stretch: Horse Racing Sim | Windows | Bigben Interactive |
| 2004 | Chaos League | Windows | Focus Home Interactive |
| 2004 | Cycling Manager 4 | Windows | Focus Home Interactive |
| 2004 | Pro Rugby Manager | Windows | Focus Home Interactive |
| 2005 | Chaos League: Sudden Death | Windows | Focus Multimedia |
| 2005 | Pro Cycling Manager | Windows | Focus Home Interactive |
| 2005 | Pro Rugby Manager 2 | Windows | Digital Jesters |
| 2005 | Pro Rugby Manager 2005 | Windows | Scubb Interactive |
| 2006 | Horse Racing Manager 2 | Windows | Micro Application |
| 2006 | NFL Head Coach | Windows, PlayStation 2, Xbox | Electronic Arts |
| 2006 | Pro Cycling Manager: Season 2006 | Windows | Focus Home Interactive |
| 2006 | Wintersport Pro 2006 | Windows | Crimson Cow |
| 2007 | Loki | Windows | Focus Home Interactive |
| 2007 | Pro Cycling: Season 2007 | PlayStation Portable | Focus Home Interactive |
| 2007 | Pro Cycling Manager: Season 2007 | Windows | Focus Home Interactive |
| 2007 | Runaway 2: The Dream of the Turtle | Nintendo DS | Focus Home Interactive |
| 2008 | Pro Cycling: Season 2008 | PlayStation Portable | 93 Games |
| 2008 | Pro Cycling Manager: Season 2008 | Windows | Focus Home Interactive |
| 2009 | Blood Bowl | Windows, Nintendo DS, PlayStation Portable, Xbox 360 | Focus Home Interactive |
| 2009 | Le Tour de France 2009: The Official Game | Xbox Live Arcade | Focus Home Interactive |
| 2009 | Pro Cycling Manager: Season 2009 | Windows | Focus Home Interactive |
| 2010 | Blood Bowl: Legendary Edition | Windows | Focus Home Interactive |
| 2010 | Dungeon Raiders | Nintendo DS | UFO Interactive Games |
| 2010 | Pro Cycling Manager: Season 2010 | Windows | Focus Home Interactive |
| 2011 | Le Tour de France | PlayStation 3, Xbox 360 | Focus Home Interactive |
| 2011 | Pro Cycling Manager: Season 2011 | Windows | Focus Home Interactive |
| 2012 | Blood Bowl: Chaos Edition | Windows | Focus Home Interactive |
| 2012 | Confrontation | Windows | Focus Home Interactive |
| 2012 | Dungeonbowl | Windows | Cyanide |
| 2012 | Game of Thrones | Windows, PlayStation 3, Xbox 360 | Focus Home Interactive |
| 2012 | Le Tour de France 2012 | PlayStation 3, Xbox 360 | Focus Home Interactive |
| 2012 | Of Orcs and Men | Windows, PlayStation 3, Xbox 360 | Focus Home Interactive |
| 2012 | Pro Cycling Manager: Season 2012 | Windows | Focus Home Interactive |
| 2013 | Aarklash: Legacy | Windows | Cyanide |
| 2013 | Dungeon Party | Windows | Cyanide |
| 2013 | Le Tour de France 2013: 100th Edition | PlayStation 3, Xbox 360 | Focus Home Interactive |
| 2013 | Pro Cycling Manager: Season 2013 | Windows | Focus Home Interactive |
| 2014 | Basketball Pro Management 2015 | Windows | Cyanide |
| 2014 | Dogs of War Online | Windows | Cyanide |
| 2014 | Front Page Sports Football | Windows | Cyanide |
| 2014 | Le Tour de France: Season 2014 | PlayStation 3, PlayStation 4, Xbox 360 | Focus Home Interactive |
| 2014 | PRM 2015: Pro Rugby Manager | Windows | 505 Games |
| 2014 | Pro Cycling Manager 2014 | Windows | Focus Home Interactive |
| 2014 | Styx: Master of Shadows | Windows, PlayStation 4, Xbox One | Focus Home Interactive |
| 2015 | Blood Bowl 2 | Windows, PlayStation 4, Xbox One | Focus Home Interactive |
| 2015 | Le Tour de France: Season 2015 | PlayStation 4, Xbox One | Focus Home Interactive |
| 2015 | Pro Cycling Manager 2015 | Windows | Focus Home Interactive |
| 2016 | Le Tour de France: Season 2016 | PlayStation 4, Xbox One | Focus Home Interactive |
| 2016 | Pro Basketball Manager 2016 | Windows | Cyanide |
| 2016 | Pro Basketball Manager 2016: US Edition | Windows | Cyanide |
| 2016 | Pro Cycling Manager 2016 | Windows | Focus Home Interactive |
| 2017 | Le Tour de France: Season 2017 | PlayStation 4, Xbox One | Focus Home Interactive |
| 2017 | Pro Basketball Manager 2017 | Windows | Cyanide |
| 2017 | Pro Cycling Manager 2017 | Windows | Focus Home Interactive |
| 2017 | Styx: Shards of Darkness | Windows, PlayStation 4, Xbox One | Focus Home Interactive |
| 2018 | Call of Cthulhu | Windows, PlayStation 4, Xbox One, Nintendo Switch | Focus Home Interactive |
| 2018 | Le Tour de France: Season 2018 | PlayStation 4, Xbox One | Focus Home Interactive |
| 2018 | Pro Cycling Manager 2018 | Windows | Focus Home Interactive |
| 2018 | Space Hulk: Tactics | Windows, PlayStation 4, Xbox One | Focus Home Interactive |
| 2019 | Blood Bowl: Death Zone | Windows | Bigben Interactive |
| 2019 | Tour de France: Season 2019 | PlayStation 4, Xbox One | Bigben Interactive |
| 2019 | Paranoia: Happiness is Mandatory | Windows | Bigben Interactive |
| 2019 | Pro Cycling Manager Season 2019 | Windows | Bigben Interactive |
| 2020 | Pro Cycling Manager 2020 | Windows | Nacon |
| 2020 | Tour de France 2020 | Windows, PlayStation 4, Xbox One | Nacon |
| 2021 | Pro Cycling Manager 2021 | Windows | Nacon |
| 2021 | Rogue Lords | Windows, Nintendo Switch, PlayStation 4, Xbox One | Nacon |
| 2021 | Tour de France 2021 | Windows, PlayStation 4, Xbox One | Nacon |
| 2021 | Werewolf: The Apocalypse - Earthblood | Windows, PlayStation 4, PlayStation 5, Xbox One, Xbox Series X/S | Nacon |
| 2022 | Tour de France 2022 | Windows, PlayStation 4, PlayStation 5, Xbox One, Xbox Series X/S | Nacon |
| 2022 | Pro Cycling Manager 2022 | Windows | Nacon |
| 2023 | Chef Life | Windows, Nintendo Switch, PlayStation 4, PlayStation 5, Xbox One, Xbox Series X/S | Nacon |
| 2023 | Blood Bowl 3 | Windows, Nintendo Switch, PlayStation 4, PlayStation 5, Xbox One, Xbox Series X/S | Nacon |
| 2023 | Pro Cycling Manager 2023 | Windows | Nacon |
| 2023 | Tour de France 2023 | Windows, PlayStation 4, PlayStation 5, Xbox One, Xbox Series X/S | Nacon |
| 2024 | Pro Cycling Manager 2024 | Windows | Nacon |
| 2024 | Tour de France 2024 | Windows, PlayStation 4, PlayStation 5, Xbox One, Xbox Series X/S | Nacon |
| 2025 | Pro Cycling Manager 2025 | Windows | Nacon |
| 2025 | Tour de France 2025 | Windows, PlayStation 5, Xbox Series X/S | Nacon |
| 2026 | Styx: Blades of Greed | Windows, PlayStation 5, Xbox Series X/S | Nacon |
| 2026 | Tour de France 2026 | Windows, PlayStation 5, Xbox Series X/S | Nacon |

=== Games by Amusement Cyanide ===
| Year | Title | Platform(s) | Publisher |
|---|---|---|---|
| 2011 | A Game of Thrones: Genesis | Windows | Focus Home Interactive |
| 2013 | Impire | Windows | Paradox Interactive |

=== Games by Big Bad Wolf ===
| Year | Title | Platform(s) | Publisher |
|---|---|---|---|
| 2018 | The Council | Windows, PlayStation 4, Xbox One | Focus Home Interactive |
| 2022 | Vampire: The Masquerade – Swansong | Windows, Nintendo Switch, PlayStation 4, PlayStation 5, Xbox One, Xbox Series X/S | Nacon |
| 2026 | Cthulhu: The Cosmic Abyss | Windows, PlayStation 5, Xbox Series X/S | Nacon |

=== Games by Rogue Factor ===
| Year | Title | Platform(s) | Publisher |
|---|---|---|---|
| 2015 | Mordheim: City of the Damned | Windows | Focus Home Interactive |
| 2016 | Mordheim: City of the Damned | PlayStation 4, Xbox One | Focus Home Interactive |
| 2020 | Necromunda: Underhive Wars | Windows, PlayStation 4, Xbox One | Focus Home Interactive |
| 2025 | Hell is Us | Windows, PlayStation 5, Xbox Series X/S | Nacon |
