= Chaos League =

2004 video game

- PAL box art
- Developer: Cyanide
- Publishers: FRA: Focus Home Interactive; UK: Digital Jesters; WW: Cyanide (digital)
- Platform: Windows
- Release: FRA: 25 June 2004; UK: 6 August 2004; WW: 12 November 2004
- Genres: Sports, management, real-time strategy
- Modes: Single-player, multiplayer

Chaos League is a 2004 fantasy-based sports management game developed by Cyanide Studios and published by Digital Jesters. The game is a spin on American football, the violence of the Medieval football with no rules and rugby-style of sports yet set in a fantasy world with teams being made up of fantasy races such as dwarves, elves, orcs and undead, along with the use of magic and other fictional elements during a "match". The tone of the game is satirical with comedic color commentary and adverts for fictional in-game universe products. An official expansion was later released in 2005 bundled with the original, titled Chaos League: Sudden Death that added new features and gameplay tweaks.

While not a direct video game adaption, Chaos League bears resemblance to Games Workshop's Blood Bowl tabletop board game, which is also about fantasy sports. Cyanide Studios would later develop the video game version of Blood Bowl in 2009, which itself utilizes certain features from Chaos League.

== Gameplay ==
Chaos League falls into a multiple genre category, both real time strategy and sports games as the game involves war based tactics like unit positions and fighting strategies however the main goal of the game to score points by getting a pig skin ball to the opposite end zone, very much like the same rules found in American football and Medieval football. Players are given a choice of 10 different fantasy based races (13 in Sudden Death) to play as their team, each with their own style of play, skill and tactics. The player then has to handle the team's finances in order to hire different players like Linemen, Quarterbacks etc. after of which can name them individually to their liking. When gameplay starts, players are given 1 minute to set up their formation, after game starts in real time. The player can click on individual teammates and give them an order like attack opponent and pick up and/or throw. Each game lasts 10 minutes, after players can be upgraded to gain extra speed or strength or to add new skills or magic abilities, all from gaining experience during the last game they played like scoring or crippling an opposing teammate.

Other aspects that differ from normal sports games include causing player knock outs, injuries or even deaths. Chaos League also includes rather crude options like stamping on downed players, intervening hooligans, drugging players before games and bribing or assaulting the referee when the rules are broken. The main basis of the game's comical style is from the commentary, done by a pair of dysfunctional Chaos League enthusiasts that would insult both each other, the fans and the players in the current game. The Sudden Death add on expanded the features to include team clans to help during gameplay, fighting the ref, and aging players over time, requiring new players every few seasons.

== Blood Bowl ==
According to Eurogamer, Cyanide originally pitched the game idea to Games Workshop in hopes of developing a licensed Blood Bowl video game. When they were rejected, they developed Chaos League independently. Besides the obvious connections to the style of the game itself, both being violent fantasy sports, minor similarities were also noticeable to Blood Bowl fans. Most notable were the recurring skills in both like "Mighty Blow", "Bulldoze" and "Projectile". Even during a loading menu in after games, a well known red sun with an Orc face, usually found on Games Workshop inks can be seen in the background.

Games Workshop has announced that Cyanide Studios now have a license to create computer games based on Blood Bowl and that "Any differences between Games Workshop and Cyanide have been amicably settled for an undisclosed sum, and as part of the settlement the Chaos League title has been assigned to Games Workshop". The game Blood Bowl was released in Q3 2009 for the PC, PlayStation Portable, Nintendo DS and Xbox 360.
