= City Life (video game) =

2006 video game

- Developers: Monte Cristo; Wizarbox (DS)
- Publishers: FRA: Monte Cristo (Note: Distributed by Focus Home Interactive.); UK: Deep Silver; UK: Monte Cristo (DS); NA: CDV
- Designer: Renaud Boclet
- Composer: Dario Eskenazi
- Platforms: Windows, Nintendo DS
- Release: April 14, 2006: FRA: April 14, 2006; UK: May 12, 2006; NA: May 30, 2006 World Edition; WW: December 30, 2006 (online); NA: February 9, 2007; EU: April 13, 2007 2008 Edition; GER: November 16, 2007; EU: February 22, 2008; NA: July 15, 2008 City Life DS; FRA: September 5, 2008; UK: August 7, 2009
- Genre: City building games
- Mode: Single-player

City Life is a city-building video game developed by Monte Cristo. It is the first modern building game to allow the player to work in full 3D environment. It was published in France by Monte Cristo, in the UK and Germany by Deep Silver and in North America by CDV. It was released in May 2006.

City Life allows players to zoom in and see every little bit of detail. The placement method allows buildings to be placed at an angle, as also seen in Sierra Games' Caesar IV.

== Summary ==
City Life continues the very long tradition of city-building and construction and management games that was originally started by Utopia from developer Don Daglow and Will Wright's SimCity series by allowing the player to customize their urban city's roads, buildings, finances, ordinances and much more. City Life utilizes a three dimensional game engine in displaying cities, and also includes the requirement to satisfy six different socioeconomic groups within the city, an essential part of gameplay. The six groups include the Elites, Suits, Radical Chics, Fringe, Blue collars and Have-Nots.

=== Socioeconomic classes ===
Diagram of the relationships between the classes in City Life.

The game classifies city residents into six socioeconomic classes, which are depicted in a circle. Clockwise from the top are Elites, Suits, Blue Collars, Have-Nots, Fringes, and Radical Chics. Each class can tolerate the two adjacent to it, but is hostile towards the three across the circle. Further, the income generated by businesses focusing on each class is indicated by its height on the circle, Have-Nots generating the least and Elites generating the most. Lastly, the left side of the circle favors education while the right side favors safety (e.g. police and fire department coverage). The higher classes are of course more demanding. When a city is founded, only Fringes, Have-Nots, and Blue Collars will settle there. The Suits must be attracted by having good conditions for the Blue Collars, the Radical Chics are attracted by good conditions for the Fringes, and the Elites are attracted by good conditions for both the Suits and the Radical Chics. Due to the literal class warfare, if classes that dislike each other live near each other, they will start riots and make complaints. Much of the gameplay focuses on arranging a city so that this will not occur.

Every business will employ a specific mix of classes; the earlier, less profitable buildings may employ only one class, e.g. six fringe, but later buildings require a mix of several classes to reach their full potential. Thus, a successful city must manage a population of each of the classes.

A city in City Life.

As their name implies, the Elites are the most powerful and wealthiest segment of the population. However, they are also the most demanding of the six, requiring quality services in sectors like education, safety, leisure, and environment. Elites are usually attracted to a city by "evolving" from either the Radical Chic or Suit groups. Most of their employment will derive from jobs in the private industry (i.e. private clinics and private colleges,) as well as jobs in large financial institutions. They are, by far, the most lucrative socialculture of the six.

The Radical Chics are ranked among the higher income groups and are as lucrative as the Suits. They are very close to the artistic and creative world and have liberal views and dispositions. Employment for Radical Chics derive from jobs in designing (i.e. clothing and interior spaces,) researching, and cosmetic surgery. Radical Chics get attracted to a city by "evolving" from Fringes. This group favors services in education and retail.

The Suits are a wealthy community whom conduct business transactions within industries. Suits are attracted to a city by "evolving" from Blue Collars. They demand quality services in safety and healthcare among others. Their employment will derive from jobs in financial advising, auditing, accounting, and stock trading.

The Fringes are artists who have low incomes (slightly lower than that of Blue Collars) and are usually fans of cultural activities. They also lean towards liberal views of the world. Fringes are naturally attracted to any city with available housing, though under certain circumstances, they will "evolve" from Have-Nots. They demand good retail services and adequate educational services. Employment for the Fringes derives primarily from clothing workshops, wood companies, and paranormal activities (i.e. wraith hunters and extraterrestrial landing sites.)

The Blue Collars work in the manufacturing and "dirty" energy industries of the city and have revenues close to that of the Fringes (they are slightly more lucrative, but their workplaces generate more pollution) They represent working class families with traditional values. Blue Collars will usually be attracted to a city with available housing, but under certain circumstances will "evolve" from Have-Nots. They demand good services for healthcare and decent services for safety. Employment for Blue Collars is usually found in manufacturing, private investigating, fishing companies, and oil derricks/platforms.

The Have-Not community is the working poor, who are too focused on meeting the most basic needs to concern themselves with the clashing values of the Fringes and Blue Collars. They are the lowest on the scale of power and wealth. Have-Nots do not demand any services at all. In fact, they are content with having nothing more than a house and a job. Unlike Fringes and Blue Collars, Have-Nots are not too easily attracted to a city. In order for them to appear, the player will usually have to create a district focusing primarily on Have-Not jobs and leisure activities. It is also possible to attract Have-Nots by having Fringes and Blue Collars "devolve" into Have-Nots. This is achieved when Fringes and Blue Collars remain unemployed for a certain amount of time.

=== Economy ===
City Life has a simple economy. Each building has infrastructure costs which are paid by the city to the business, including fixed costs and costs which are related to the number of employees a building requires. Roads, bridges, parks and monuments also count as buildings in this way. Buildings also have indirect costs with regards the energy they consume and waste they produce. Buildings which represent businesses also generate income which is taxed and is paid back to the city. Therefore, the monthly budget for the city (i.e. for the player) is calculated by taking the taxed income and subtracting the infrastructure costs for each building. For example, the basic industrial building has $50 of fixed infrastructure costs and generates up to $100 in revenue tax per worker. When staffed with 3 workers the net profit for the city is thus $250 per month.

However, profits from business are not guaranteed at a fixed rate. For example, building a vegan restaurant in a city with a low population of Radical Chics will result in less than maximum income. Similarly, a casino won't turn maximum profit until there are Elites. In this way, the game forces the player to partially develop the richer communities in order to make their larger businesses viable.

Energy and waste in City Life are also considered a kind of income. Energy or waste management that the city provides for itself is cheaper than buying those services externally. Any surplus energy can be sold for profit, as can excess waste management. For example, a power station generates 5100 points of energy. If the city uses only 3100 energy, then the remaining 2000 energy will be sold and is counted as monthly profit. Incidentally this makes the power station one of the best initial industries for a city since it provides work for Blue Collar and profits are much larger than other industrial businesses.

== Expansions ==
=== World Edition ===
A City Life expansion pack, dubbed City Life: World Edition, was released on December 30, 2006 online and on February 9, 2007 in stores in the U.S. World Edition features landmarks around the world, including the Eiffel Tower and the Sears Tower. Additional content includes:

- Building Creation Tool
- 100 new buildings, bringing the total number of buildings to 300.

==== City Life Deluxe ====
On December 30, 2006, registered game users received an email advertisement for City Life Deluxe, which was released only in Europe on April 13, 2007.

=== 2008 Edition ===
On August 30, 2007, Monte Cristo and Focus announced an upcoming second expansion pack for City Life entitled City Life 2008 Edition, saying the expansion would include "60 more buildings, bringing the total to 360, including famous structures such as St Paul's Cathedral, Royal Opera etc... New scenarios, 10 new maps, and an updated version of the editor allow you to import satellite maps, as well as import from applications such as World Machine, or GeoControl." The official release date for the expansion pack was November 10, 2007. On November 16, 2007, the release date was pushed back to November 23, 2007. The game was finally released in 2007-2008.

=== DS ===
Monte Cristo confirmed, in 2008, that they would make a City Life game for Nintendo DS. The DS version was released in Europe in late 2008, and in the UK in August 2009.

== Reception ==
=== City Life ===
City Life

Aggregate score
Aggregator	Score
Metacritic	76/100

Review scores
Publication	Score
1Up.com	B+
4Players	79%
Computer Games Magazine	4/5
Computer Gaming World	(mixed)
Eurogamer	8/10
GamesMaster	77%
GameSpot	7.8/10
GameSpy	3/5
GameZone	7.9/10
IGN	8/10
Jeuxvideo.com	14/20
PC Gamer (UK)	79%
PC Gamer (US)	83%
PC Zone	73%
The Sydney Morning Herald	3.5/5
The Times	4/5

City Life received "generally favorable reviews" according to the review aggregation website Metacritic.

=== World Edition ===
City Life: World Edition

Aggregate score
Aggregator	Score
Metacritic	75/100

Review scores
Publication	Score
1Up.com	A−
GameZone	8.2/10

City Life: World Edition received "generally favorable reviews according to Metacritic.

=== 2008 Edition ===
City Life 2008 Edition

Aggregate score
Aggregator	Score
Metacritic	66/100

Review scores
Publication	Score
1Up.com	C
Eurogamer	5/10
GamesMaster	75%
GameSpot	5/10
GameZone	7/10
IGN	6.9/10
PC Gamer (UK)	76%
PC Zone	74%

City Life 2008 Edition received average reviews according to Metacritic. PC Gamer UK said it was "No great shakes, but an awful lot better than SimCity Societies." 1Up.com concluded that "the solid city-building engine still has legs – just nowhere to walk."

=== City Life DS ===
City Life DS

Review scores
Publication	Score
4Players	77%
Jeuxvideo.com	15/20

City Life DS received average reviews.

== See also ==
- Cities XXL
- Cities XL
