= Cities XL 2011 =

2010 video game

- Cities XL 2011 disc case
- Developer(s): Focus Home Interactive
- Publisher(s): Focus Home Interactive
- Series: Cities XL
- Platform(s): Microsoft Windows
- Release: October 14, 2010
- Genre(s): City simulator
- Mode(s): Single-player

Cities XL 2011 is a city simulator developed by Focus Home Interactive. Cities XL 2011 is the second game in the Cities XL franchise. The game focuses on a single-player mode, and was released on October 14, 2010. New features include more buildings and maps, improved public transport, an enhanced tax system, and better trading options.

== Development ==
The game was officially announced by Focus Home Interactive, who took over the game license when Monte Cristo shut down due to the poor sales of Cities XL.

== Release ==
Cities XL 2011 was released on October 14, 2010.

== Reception ==
Reception

Aggregate scores
Aggregator	Score
GameRankings	75%
Metacritic	70 of 100

Review scores
Publication	Score
GameZone	7 of 10
IGN	7.0 of 10
PC Gamer (UK)	71%

Cities XL 2011 received average reviews. IGN describes the game as "much like its predecessor, minus the multiplayer" and concludes that it "doesn't have much new to offer". The review did however praise the game's tutorial and graphics. GameZone compared Cities XL 2011 to Civilization IV and concluded that "while the lack of a game-winning goal or story won't sit well with some players, it by no means disrupts the addictive nature of Cities XL 2011". Aggregate review websites give scores of 75.13% on GameRankings, and 70 (out of 100) on Metacritic.
