= Impire =

2013 video game

- Developer: Cyanide Studios
- Publisher: Paradox Interactive
- Platform: Microsoft Windows
- Release: February 14, 2013
- Genres: Strategy, dungeon management

Impire is a real-time strategy video game developed by Cyanide Studios and published by Paradox Interactive, and released for Microsoft Windows via Steam on February 14, 2013.

== Gameplay ==
Initial press reactions to Impire drew comparisons with Bullfrog Productions's Dungeon Keeper, a real-time strategy game released in 1997 that received widespread critical acclaim. Alongside Dungeon Keeper, Impire similarly grants the player command over a subterranean empire, with the ability to construct buildings, recruit monsters, and engage minions in combat.

== Setting ==
Within the fictional universe of Impire, the player assumes the persona of Baʿal-Abaddon, a primordial evil summoned from Tartarus and imprisoned in the physical form of a demonic imp, initially forced to serve the incompetent sorcerer Oscar van Fairweather. During the course of Impire, Baal-Abaddon escapes van Fairweather's control and attempts to reconstruct his ancient, nefarious empire under the continent of Ardania.

== Development ==
Shortly after announcing the project on July 26, 2012, Yves Bordeleau, the Studio Director of Cyanide Montreal indicated that Impire was in 'pre-pre-alpha' during his presentation to GameSpot staff. Throughout Bordeleau's demonstration, he frequently referenced the 'scenarios' in the single-player and co-operative campaign setting of Impire, suggesting that the structure of the game is predominantly mission-based.

== Reception ==
Reception

Aggregate score
Aggregator	Score
Metacritic	45/100

Review scores
Publication	Score
4Players	65%
Destructoid	3.5/10
Eurogamer	3/10
Game Informer	5/10
GameSpot	4.5/10
GameSpy	1.5/5
GameStar	47%
Jeuxvideo.com	14/20
PC Gamer (UK)	63%
PC PowerPlay	3/10
The Escapist	1/5

Impire received "unfavorable" reviews according to the review aggregation website Metacritic.
