= Cities XL =

2009 video game

- Developer: Monte Cristo
- Publisher: Monte Cristo
- Designer: Patrick Marechal
- Composer: Dynamedion
- Series: Cities XL
- Platform: Microsoft Windows
- Release: AU: October 8, 2009; EU: October 8, 2009; NA: October 9, 2009
- Genres: City-building game, massively multiplayer online game
- Modes: Single-player, multiplayer

Cities XL (originally Cities Unlimited) is a city-building video game developed by Monte Cristo as a sequel to their earlier title City Life. It was originally scheduled for release in the first quarter of 2009, but was eventually released on October 8, 2009. The game allowed players to play online and interact with others on massive persistent planets, and to work together by trading resources or building blueprints in order to satisfy the needs of city inhabitants. However, on March 8, 2010 the online service was closed and the game became single-player only.

Focus Home Interactive acquired the franchise in June 2010 and released Cities XL 2011 on October 14, 2010. The third installment, Cities XL Platinum, was released on February 14, 2013. A new version, Cities XXL, was announced on November 15, 2014, and released on February 5, 2015.

== Gameplay ==
=== Beginnings as MMO ===
Cities XL allowed players an option to play on a persistent online virtual community known as a planet which required a monthly subscription fee. As a member of a planet, players were able to build their cities in a virtual world populated by other subscribers, trade resources such as electricity with other players, work together to create structures such as the Eiffel Tower, and visit other cities as an avatar and host events.

On January 27, 2010 Monte Cristo announced due to a low subscription rate they would be closing the multiplayer online service, and they did so on March 8, 2010. A patch was released on the same day allowing players to use buses in single-player mode, as they had previously only been available in multiplayer mode.

=== Zoning ===
Concept image of Cities XL.

The game offers the designation of three types of building lots: residential, commercial and industrial, each of which can have a different density. Residential lots are furthermore distinguished by four social classes: unskilled workers, skilled workers, executives, and elites. Before designating building lots, players are required to select which class of residents may live there. The social class chosen for a lot will not be modified by the simulation.

To create building lots, players can zone an area of the map in which, upon confirmation, individual building lots will be created by the game. Players can also plop building lots individually. A Mass Placement Tool has been announced in previews allowing players to select tags that define what categories of buildings they want to see created when outlining an area of lots.

=== Transport ===
Cities XL allows players to create a road network of a variety of road types at many different angles and curvatures. Bridges and tunnels are also part of the simulator. Other transport options that were planned to be included in the game were airports, trains, ferries and subways. An add-on introducing buses to the game was released in December 2009.

=== Gameplay Extension Modules ===
An unimplemented feature known as Gameplay Extension Modules (GEMs), also referred to as Game Enhancement Modules, were features, such as a ski resort or a beach, that would have been implemented into a city and managed in extra detail by the player. For example, in a ski resort GEM, it would have been possible to add ski lifts, restaurants, shelters, and ski-trails. It was planned that when a player was managing a GEM the main city simulation was stopped, but successful management of GEMs could help enhance a city.

== Development ==
Release timeline
2006	City Life
2007
2008
2009	Cities XL
2010	Cities XL 2011
2011	Cities XL 2012
2012
2013	Cities XL Platinum
2014
2015	Cities XXL

=== Terrain ===
World view in Cities XL.

The terrain is composed of height maps, textures and a normal map. Instead of creating new tools, Monte Cristo relies on existing third-party tools like EarthSculptor, World Machine and GeoControl to generate unique realistic terrain before importing it into their terrain-editing software. In addition, middleware like SpeedTree has also been used for in-game afforestation. In an interview on September 11, 2007 Philippe Da Silva announced that Cities XL would include a large variety of maps and landscapes, which would allow players a greater depth with the types of cities they wanted to create. A pre-released screen shot of an Aspen map confirmed that Cities XL would include snowy landscapes.

=== 3D engine ===
Monte Cristo has made a 3D engine that allows lower-range PCs to run the game. The player may not have all the graphic options fully turned on but still get better quality visuals than City Life.

=== Release ===
In June 2007, a screenshot of a new city building game from Monte Cristo was posted in Philippe Da Silva's personal blog. However, it was later revealed in a community website interview that it would not be called City Life 2, and was initially named Cities Unlimited to avoid confusion. On April 15, 2008 it was announced that Cities Unlimited official game title would be Cities XL. On July 6, 2009, Namco Bandai Partners announced that they would distribute the game in the United Kingdom, Nordic regions, Iberica, Italy, Australia and New Zealand, while Monte Cristo would continue to distribute for the rest of Europe.

The game was released on October 8, 2009 in Oceania and in Europe, and on October 9, 2009 in North America. Two different versions of the game were released, a standard edition and a limited edition. The limited edition contained extra content including additional landmarks, additional maps, and a poster. A demo was also previously available.

During the development of Cities XL, Monte Cristo maintained a developer blog and internet forums on their main website. Prior to the game's release, both the blog and user forum were closed and removed from public view. The company had stated that the community was not to worry, as they have "saved all of the good posts", and would continue to maintain a presence on websites such as Simtropolis.

Monte Cristo shut down in May 2010 following poor sales of Cities XL.

=== Cities XL 2011 ===
On June 25, 2010 it was announced that Focus Home Interactive had acquired the Cities XL franchise, and that a new version of Cities XL titled Cities XL 2011 would be released on October 14, 2010. New features included more buildings and maps, improved public transport, an enhanced tax system, and better trading options.

=== Cities XL 2012 ===
On July 11, 2011 the franchise's developers announced a new version of Cities XL titled Cities XL 2012. It became available on October 20, 2011 as a standalone game. The new version includes new structures, new maps, a starter guide, opens the game to modding and allows players to share their mods. It is fully compatible with Cities XL 2011 version with a discounted upgrade available. It was also simultaneously released as an expansion pack or update of Cities XL 2011.

=== Cities XL Platinum ===
Cities XL Platinum was released on February 6, 2013, a sequel to Cities XL 2012 which adds 50 new buildings and new maps.

=== Cities XXL ===
On February 5, 2015 the franchise's developers released a new version of Cities XL titled Cities XXL. It features enhanced logic, and a few new buildings, with a new style for the user interface.

== Reception ==
Reception

Aggregate scores
Aggregator	Score
GameRankings	68%
Metacritic	69 of 100

Review scores
Publication	Score
1Up.com	C+
GamesMaster	77%
GameSpot	6.0 of 10
IGN	8.1 of 10
PC Gamer (UK)	75%
PC Zone	66%

Cities XL received average reviews. IGN described the game as having "pushed the genre in the right direction" with its "friendlier learning curve" compared to the SimCity series. The review praised the ability to add curved roads, and the "gorgeous" graphics, however, the multiplayer feature was described as "shallow" and the subscription cost was questioned.

GameSpot praised Cities XL for "taking a city builder online", but described the multiplayer feature as "limited and overpriced", and the single-player mode as an "afterthought". The review criticised the limited trading options in single-player mode and commented that the graphics were "bland". 1UP.com also criticised the trading features of the game, and while the review did describe the graphics as "fantastic", it concluded that Cities XL was being "dragged down" by a lack of features. Aggregate review websites give scores of 68.27% on GameRankings, and 69 (out of 100) on Metacritic.

== See also ==
- Cities: Skylines
- SimCity (series)
- City Life (video game)
