= Styx: Blades of Greed =

2026 video game

- Developer: Cyanide
- Publisher: Nacon
- Composer: H-Pi
- Engine: Unreal Engine 5
- Platforms: PlayStation 5; Windows; Xbox Series X/S
- Release: 19 February 2026
- Genre: Stealth
- Mode: Single-player

Styx: Blades of Greed is a stealth video game developed by Cyanide and published by Nacon. The sequel to Styx: Shards of Darkness (2017), it was released in February 2026 for PlayStation 5, Windows and Xbox Series X/S.

== Gameplay ==
Similar to its predecessors, Blades of Greed is a stealth game played from a third-person perspective. In the game, the player assumes control of a goblin named Styx, who must infiltrate Inquisition strongholds to steal a resource known as Quartz. The game has three large areas which can be freely explored, and there are multiple ways for players to reach their objectives and infiltrate a location. Styx is equipped with a variety of gadgets, such as a grappling hook and a glider, allowing it to travel between locations quickly. Styx also possesses magical abilities by using Quartz, allowing it to perform feats such as mind control and slowing down time. The game was also inspired by Metroidvania, as unlocking new tools and upgrades allows players to reach previously inaccessible areas.

== Development ==
The team described Blades of Greed as their most "ambitious" Styx game as it moved away from having traditional levels to having larger, semi-open worlds which can be explored by players. In the game, Styx remained a "sarcastic and irreverent" character, and the story explores the origin of the war between Orcs and the Empire, setting the foundation for the franchise's first game, Of Orcs and Men.

== Reception ==
Reception

Aggregate scores
Aggregator	Score
Metacritic	(PC) 75/100 (PS5) 70/100 (XSXS) 68/100
OpenCritic	51% recommend

Review scores
Publication	Score
Eurogamer	4/5
GamesRadar+	4/5
IGN	6/10
PC Gamer (US)	82/100
TechRadar	4/5

Styx: Blades of Greed received "mixed or average" reviews for the PlayStation 5 and Xbox Series X/S versions while the Windows version received "generally favorable" reviews, according to review aggregator website Metacritic. Fellow review aggregator OpenCritic assessed that the game received fair approval, being recommended by 51% of critics.

Jim Trinca from Eurogamer wrote that the game was "easily the best stealth game in years", praising how it weaved Metroidvania elements into its gameplay loop, and made revisiting locations engaging. Travis Northup from IGN praised the fundamental gameplay mechanics and the new adjustments introduced by Cyanide, though he felt that it also retained many of the franchise's problems, such as weak controls, forgettable story, and performance issues, which were "as disappointing as they are completely expected".
