= Pro Cycling Manager =

- Genre: Simulation
- Developer: Cyanide Studio
- Publisher: Nacon
- Platform: Microsoft Windows

Tour de France
- Genre: Simulation
- Developer: Cyanide Studio
- Publisher: Nacon
- Platforms: PlayStation; Xbox; Microsoft Windows

Pro Cycling Manager is a series of cycling management and real-time simulation games created by Cyanide. The game was first launched in 2001 as Cycling Manager, but the series took on the Pro label in June 2005. A new version is released every year to coincide with the Tour de France. The game is offered in a variety of languages (including French, English, German, Spanish, Italian, Dutch, Danish, Norwegian, Portuguese) although the actual language configuration depends on the local publisher. Pro Cycling Manager runs on the PC. The game is produced in cooperation with most of the main professional cycling teams under the aegis of the IPCT and the AIGCP. In September 2007 a PlayStation Portable version of the game was released, called Pro Cycling. It is engineered to take advantage of PSP gameplay capabilities and offers a limited management mode.

Every year there is a console game Tour de France for PlayStation and Xbox, where players can ride the Tour de France and more.

== Game objectives ==
In Pro Cycling Manager there are three game modes: Career, One-off Race and Track Cycling. In Career, the player becomes the manager of a cycling team of their choice. In One-off Race, the player can lead their team in any race without reaching the race date in career. In Track mode, the player can ride as a track cyclist in track disciplines such as Keirin, Points race, etc. In the 2015 version of the game there is a new mode called Be a Pro (later called Pro Cyclist), in which the player creates a custom young cyclist, sets his personality such as climber or sprinter, and builds his career.

There are also database and stage editors, which the player can use to edit cyclists, their stats, teams, etc., or to make custom stages and races to race on.

== See also ==
- Tour de France (2011)
- Tour de France 2013: 100 Edition
