= Confrontation (Rackham) =

Fantasy miniature wargame

- Manufacturers: Rackham
- Designers: Jean Bey, Jerome Rigal
- Publishers: Rackham
- Years active: 14 (1996-2010)
- Players: 2
- Playing time: 120 min.
- Chance: Lots of dice rolling
- Skills: Strategy

Confrontation is a skirmish level tactical fantasy miniature wargaming in which the combatants are represented by metal or plastic figures in 28 mm scale. For comparison purposes, the system's figures are slightly larger than those of Games Workshop or The Foundry.

The game is set in Aarklash, a world of medieval fantasy where knights, wizards, priests and barbarians fight each other as well as fantastic creatures such as wolfen, elves, orcs, goblins and the undead. The entire world is at war and all are fighting for the supremacy of the continent.

The rules are intended to be versatile, and are able to represent a small fight between a handful of warriors just as well as a large skirmish between several dozen soldiers and their leaders. The last rules were in its fourth edition, a single hardback edition. The first edition was only available in French, German and Italian, while the second was available in French, German, Italian, English and Spanish. Rackham collapsed in 2010.

== Playing the game ==
Each player in the game needs to acquire several miniatures to represent his forces. Miniatures are bought in blister packs, each containing one or more metal figures, a booklet of basic game rules, and a special reference card that describes the characteristics and special abilities of the game pieces. A photo or artist's drawing of the figures is on the reverse of the reference card, as a painting guide for the hobbyist.

Several six-sided dice and a table with scale scenery to play on are also needed.

== The Miniatures ==
Rackham originally produced metal miniatures for Confrontation in blisters of one to four models, or boxed sets of one to eight models.

=== Confrontation: Age of Ragnarok ===
With the release of "Confrontation: Age of Ragnarok", Rackham changed the supporting miniature line from unpainted metal figures to pre-painted plastic figures. This follows the production model used in "AT-43", their science fiction miniatures game. The models were packaged in multiple figure sets that correspond with units and auxiliaries as described in the various army lists.

== Factions ==
The Akkylannie Griffons are a fanatical army of humans that worship Merin, the God of Fire, spreading their truth through fire and sword. The Griffon army is characterized by heavily armoured troops, high Discipline, strong ranged weapons, and powerful Faithful. The Alchemists of Dirz were founded by a high priest of Merin who was so consumed with attaining perfection that he began dark experiments combining man and science. Dirz soldiers tend to have better attack stats with the possibility of boosting their abilities with their Mutagen. The Kelt Drunes are a tribe of human barbarians dwell within the heart of a dark forest. The Devourers of Vile-Tis are Wolfen who have separated from the rest of their race. Devourers have high Movement, Resilience, and Defence with above average Strength making very dangerous and hard to kill. There were also Dwarven, Goblin, Undead, Orc and Elven factions.

== Editions of the game ==
=== First Edition ===
Confrontation can be played with the basic rules alone, but there are several supplements available. These describe optional rules and multiply the tactical options allowed. All are packed free in the appropriate blisters, just like the basic rules.

Incantation introduces powerful Wizards to the game. In this supplement a new characteristic appears: Mental Strength. Mental Strength is the essential element used to call upon the power of Magic. Wizards can use that power to change the course of battle: project fire balls, raise the dead and even invoke powerful spirits. Every blister that contains a Wizard includes a free Incantation Rules Booklet as well as cards that describe magic items and special spells particular to each. A small plate of counters representing 'Mana', the very essence of Magic, is also included. 'Grimoires,' packs of 15 additional spell cards, are available separately.

Incarnation allows players to individualize their game characters. Special 'Adventurer' figures are furnished with the Incarnation Rules Booklet which details how they progress in experience. The character acquires power, fame, new abilities and magic objects as he accomplishes quests. Two new types of cards are packed in the Adventurer blisters: Scenarios and Experience Cards. Each Adventurer is furnished with a scenario specially written for him. Scenarios card packs are also available separately. Many scenarios based on the official characters of the range are available free on the Confrontation web site (in French). 'Travel Journals,' packs of cards for treasures, rare objects or magic artifacts, are available to further customize scenarios.

=== Second Edition ===
Divination addresses the gods themselves and their servants, the faithful Priests that represent them on the battlefields. The magic of the Priests is powerful but variable, for it depends on the vagaries of the fickle gods. It also tends to be more defensive in nature than Wizards' magic. The blisters of the Priests figures are packaged with the Divination Rules Booklet and several 'Miracle' cards to call upon the aid of the divine powers. The 'Litanies' card packs group together additional miracle cards.

Fortification adds in war machines such as cannon, ballista, and chariots. Some of the existing figures, such as the Dwarf Steam Cannon are reclassified to war machines.

=== Third Edition ===
The third edition of Confrontation was issued as both basic rules, included in miniature blisters, and as a hardback bound advanced rules. The basic rules described combat and movement, but did not explain abilities or magic. The advanced rules included all rules from the second edition with some refinements in play.

One notable aspect of the third edition was its obsolescence of the adventure, spell, and miracle card packs. The reworked magic rules in the third edition significantly reduced the number of available spells by eliminating the previously released spell books. The book also includes an extensive section covering the changes to the existing model line and associated cards.

The unbalancing army cards were removed in this edition. Also removed was the declarable target number while making attack die rolls. Separate shooting and magic phases were also done away with. Now the round is based on only 4 phases with shooting taking place in the activation and magic being used throughout the round dictated by card text.

An on-line only revision was published within a year of the publication of the third edition. Called "Confrontation 3.5", this revision changed some abilities, reworked the line of sight rules, and changed the way spells and miracles were added to a force by removing points costs from them. This update also significantly changed the balance of ranged units by giving them the abilities "Bull's eye" and "Assault fire" and giving units that already had those abilities "cookies" to improve them. Dogs of War was the only supplement for Confrontation Third Edition.

=== Fourth Edition ===
The fourth edition of Confrontation was named "Confrontation: Age of Ragnarok". This edition made major changes to the rules, including changing the game scope from single-model skirmish to small unit battle. As with second edition, Confrontation: Age of Ragnarok has re-issued the game cards to reflect the new rules and statistics.

== Supplements ==
=== Dogs of War ===
"Dogs of War" was the supplement to Confrontation, third edition. It provides campaign rules that allow players to create small warbands that gain experience and improve as they are fielded in the games. These personalized warbands can be played in games of Confrontation or Rag'Narok, though they are not sanctioned for official tournaments. In addition, Dogs of War includes expanded terrain rules, rules for Nexi, scenario rules, and rules for very large models, called Titans. Dogs of War is not suitable for earlier editions of the game.

=== Cry Havoc! Magazine ===
"Cry Havoc!", originally offered as a quarterly magazine, is available six times a year and is published by Rackham that includes information about its different games. The publication includes two magazines and new reference cards. The larger magazine has general articles on painting and modeling, as well as features on the games, tactics articles, battle reports, and background information on the world of Aarklash. The second magazine consists of play aids, variant rules, and scenarios. The reference cards supplement and augment the articles in the two magazines. These cards are not available separately.

== Other related games ==
=== Rag'Narok ===
"Rag'Narok" is at once an evolution of the basic game and an entirely new one. Where the basic game represents small confrontations and skirmishes, in Rag'Narok entire armies are involved in battles. Rag'Narok uses exactly the same basic resources as Confrontation (figures, cards and game characteristics), but the rules differ somewhat to accommodate the change in scope and keep the game manageable. "Confrontation: Age of Ragnarok" is a melding of the earlier versions of Confrontation with Rag'narok.

=== Hybrid ===
"Hybrid" and its expansion "Nemesis" is a board game set in the world of Aarklash. The game is played on illustrated tiles arranged to form the floor plan of the underground laboratories of the Alchemists of Dirz. Players take the role of either the denizens of these laboratories or the outside forces invading them to either steal their secrets or shut them down. The rules of this subgame resemble Space Hulk somewhat. The game uses a subset of the figures but with different reference cards.

=== Cadwallon ===
Unlike the miniatures wargame Confrontation, Cadwallon is a role-playing game. It uses the same setting of Aarklash and the same miniatures as other games in the Rackham line, and illustrated tiles could be purchased on which to play. Cadwallon was designed in 2006 by Jean Bey, co-founder of Rackham. A novel set in Cadwallon, Les Cendres de la Colère (The Ashes of Anger) by Mathieu Gaborit, was also published by Rackham. A total of six supplements for Cadwallon were published by Rackham from 2006 to 2008.

=== Arcana ===
A card game set in the city of Cadwallon.

=== Cadwallon:City of Thieves ===
A fast paper board game developed by Rackham and released by Fantasy Flight Games. Each player plays a gang of thieves and try to score highest thievery at the end of 'night'. An expansion named 'Cadwallon: City of Thieves - The King of Ashes' released for the game as well as some DLC by Fantasy Flight Games. A video game adaptation of the board game released by the same name for iPad and iPhone.

=== Guilds of Cadwallon ===
A tactical card and miniature game set in the city of Cadwallon, published by CoolMiniOrNot in 2013. The playing area consists of a 3x3 (or larger, depending on the number of players) grid of randomized cards, each representing a city district. Players compete for control of these districts with careful placement of their figures, and scoring is based on both the number of assets a player controls as well as how specialized those assets are in any given guild.

== The Confederations ==
The Confederations are a non-profit corporations set up in various countries to help expand the player base for Rackham's games. They work together as sister organizations, coordinating global tournaments and leagues. They also run tournaments, leagues, and demonstrations of the games in their own countries. Membership in the confederations is open to anyone in their region. For an annual fee, a member has access to purchase exclusive Confederation miniatures as well as the ability to be ranked both nationally and internationally.

== Reviews ==
- Backstab #9
- Backstab #34
