= Focus Entertainment =

French video game company

Focus Entertainment Publishing
- Formerly: Focus Home Interactive (1996–2021)
- Type: Subsidiary
- Industry: Video games
- Founded: 1996; 30 years ago
- Headquarters: Paris, France
- Key people: Christophe Nobileau (President and CEO)
- Products: A Plague Tale series City Life series Cities XL series Pro Cycling Manager series Sherlock Holmes series TrackMania series Wargame series
- Parent: PulluP Entertainment (2024–present)
- Subsidiaries: Deck13; Dotemu; Douze Dixiemes; Leikir Studio; BlackMill Games; Dovetail Games; Carpool Studio
- Website: www.focus-entmt.com

Focus Entertainment Publishing (formerly Focus Home Interactive and Focus Entertainment) is a French video game publisher based in Paris. It became a subsidiary of holding PulluP Entertainment Group in 2024. Founded in 1996, Focus has published and distributed original titles such as Sherlock Holmes, TrackMania, Runaway, and sports games like Cycling Manager and Virtual Skipper.

== History ==
Focus Home Interactive was founded in 1996 in Paris. Initially a distributor of software, the company shifted its focus to video game publishing around 2000. During the 2000s it established itself as a publisher of PC and console games, releasing titles and series such as Runaway, TrackMania, Cycling Manager, and Cossacks, while later publishing internationally successful franchises including Farming Simulator.

In June 2010, Focus acquired the Cities XL franchise from the bankrupt developer Monte Cristo. In 2012, the company began publishing games developed by Giants Software, further strengthening its position in the simuation genre. CEO Cédric Lagarrigue, who had led the company for two decades, departed in 2018.

Beginning in 2020, Focus pursued a strategy of expansion through acquisitions, purchasing several development studios including Deck13, Streum On Studio, Dotemu, Douze Dixièmes, Leikir Studio, BlackMill Games, and Dovetail Games. These acquisitions transformed the company from primarily a publisher into a group with substantial internal development capabilities.

On 6 September 2021, Focus Home Interactive was renamed Focus Entertainment to reflect its broader activities in the video game industry. In 2024, the company underwent a major corporate reorganization and adopted the name PulluP Entertainment. Under the new structure, Focus Entertainment Publishing continued as the group’s publishing subsidiary while the parent company assumed a holding and support role for its publishing and development businesses.

== Studios ==
Name		Location	Founded or acquired	Ref(s).
BlackMill Games		Heiloo, Netherlands	September 2022	
Deck13	Deck13 Hamburg	Hamburg, Germany	June 2020	
Deck13	Deck13 Montreal	Montreal, Canada	June 2020	
Deck13	Deck13 Spotlight	Frankfurt, Germany	June 2020	
Dotemu		Paris, France	August 2021	
Douze Dixièmes		Saint Ouen, France	October 2021	
Carpool Studio		Paris, France	June 2023	
Leikir Studio		Ivry-sur-Seine, France	February 2022	
Dovetail Games		Chatham, England	April 2023	
