= Feralia (disambiguation) =

Feralia was the ancient Roman public festival, celebrated on 21 February

Feralia may refer to:

- Feralia Planitia, a large feature on 4 Vesta
- Feralia (moth), a genus of moths
  - Feralia comstocki
  - Feralia deceptiva
  - Feralia februalis
  - Feralia jocosa
  - Feralia major
