= Funny Man =

Funny Man or Funnyman may refer to:

== People ==
- A comedian
- One member of a comedic double act
- A person who tells jokes
- A person who performs physical comedy

== Entertainment ==
- Funny Man (film), a 1994 British film written and directed by Simon Sprackling
- A Funny Man, a 2011 Danish drama film directed by Martin Zandvliet
- Funny Man (TV series), a British comedy television series
- Funnyman (comics), a comics character

=== Music ===
- Funny Man, a member of the American rap rock band Hollywood Undead
- Funny Man (album), a 1989 album by Ray Stevens
- "Funny Man", a single by Baby Cham from his 2000 album Wow... The Story
- "Funnyman", a song by KT Tunstall from her 2007 album Drastic Fantastic

== See also ==
- Comedian (disambiguation)
- Comic (disambiguation)
- Funny Boy (disambiguation)
- Funny Girl (disambiguation)
- Jester (disambiguation)
- Joker (disambiguation)
- Jokester (disambiguation)
- Practical joker (disambiguation)
