= Joker =

Joker(s) or The Joker(s) may refer to:

== Common meanings ==
- Jester, a person employed to tell jokes and provide entertainment during the Middle Ages and the Renaissance
- Joker (playing card), found in most modern French-suited card decks

== Fictional characters ==
=== Literature ===
- Joker (character), a DC Comics character
  - Joker (Jack Napier), the character as he appears in the 1989 film Batman
  - Joker (The Dark Knight), the character as he appears in the 2008 film The Dark Knight
  - Joker (Martha Wayne), the character as she appears in the 2011 story arc Flashpoint
- Joker, a character from the British comic strip Joker (comic strip), a comic strip in the British anthology comics
- Joker (Flame of Recca), from the Japanese manga series Flame of Recca
- Mr. Joker, or Joe Carpenter, in Read or Die
- Joker (Wild Cards), a person with a harmful mutation in Wild Cards
- Jokers, a race of super-beings in Terry Pratchett's novel The Dark Side of the Sun
- James T. "Joker" Davis, protagonist of the novel The Short-Timers
- Joker, a character from Black Butler: Book of Circus
- Joker, the underground alias of Donquixote Doflamingo, a pirate from One Piece
- Jackie Jokers, a character in Richie Rich comics from Harvey Comics

=== Film and television ===
- Kamen Rider Chalice, or Joker, from Kamen Rider Blade
- Kamen Rider Joker, a rider form of Shotaro Hidari, from Kamen Rider W Forever: A to Z/The Gaia Memories of Fate
- Joker, from J.A.K.Q. Dengekitai
- James T. "Joker" Davis, in Full Metal Jacket
- Impractical Jokers, also called Jokers, American cringe comedy show
- Joker, from Smile PreCure!
- Joker, from Mera Naam Joker (lit. 'My Name is Joker'), 1970 Indian film

=== Video games ===
- Joker (Mass Effect), from Mass Effect
- Joker (Persona), from Persona 5
- Joker, a character from Persona 2: Innocent Sin
- Joker, a character from the Monster Rancher series
- The Joker, from Fighters Destiny
- Joker (Suikoden), from Suikoden III
- The Joker, from SaGa Frontier
- Joker, from Alice in the Country of Hearts
- Joker, a character from Call of Duty: Advanced Warfare
- Joker Flight, The Player Squadron in Ace Combat 8: Wings of Theve

== People ==
- Joker (nickname), a list of people with the nickname
- Joker (British musician), English dubstep artist Liam McLean (born 1989)
- Jonas Berggren (born 1967), Swedish musician and record producer also known as Joker
- Jokeren or The Joker, Danish rapper Jesper Dahl (born 1973)
- Joker (wrestler), a ring name of American professional wrestler William Posada (born 1983)
- Joker Xue, Chinese singer-songwriter

== Places ==
- Joker, West Virginia, an unincorporated community in the US
- Jokers Hill, a hill in the Koffler Scientific Reserve, York County, Ontario, Canada

== Films ==
- The Joker (1928 film), a Danish-German silent drama
- The Joker (1960 film), a French comedy by Philippe de Broca
- The Jokers, a 1967 British comedy starring Michael Crawford and Oliver Reed
- The Joker (1987 film) or Lethal Obsession, a German crime-thriller film
- Joker (1993 film), an Indian Telugu comedy produced by P. Pattabhi Rama Rao
- Joker (2000 film), an Indian Malayalam film by A. K. Lohithadas
- Joker (2012 film), an Indian Hindi film starring Akshay Kumar
- The Joker (2014 film) or Poker Night, an American-Canadian crime thriller by Greg Francis
- Joker (2016 film), an Indian Tamil film by Raju Murugan
- Joker (2019 film), an American film starring Joaquin Phoenix

== Literature ==
- The Joker (comic book), a DC Comics comic book series starring the titular Joker
- Joker (graphic novel), a DC Comics graphic novel starring the titular Joker
- Joker (comic strip), in the British anthology comics
- Joker (American magazine), an American men's digest published by Humorama
- Joker (Slovenian magazine), a Slovenian monthly magazine based in Ljubljana

== Music ==
=== Albums ===
- The Joker (album), 1973, by the Steve Miller Band
- Joker, by Mirkelam
- Joker (soundtrack), 2019, for the 2019 film Joker

=== Songs ===
- "The Joker (That's What They Call Me)", 1957, by Billy Myles
- "The Joker" (Anthony Newley song), from the musical The Roar of the Greasepaint – The Smell of the Crowd (1964); covered by Lady Gaga for the 2024 film Joker: Folie à Deux
- "The Joker" (Steve Miller Band song) (1973)
- "The Joker", 1988, by Quiet Riot from QR
- "The Joker", 2006, by Heavenly from Virus
- "The Joker", 2010, by Zona B
- "Joker" (Anna Rossinelli song) (2011)
- "Joker" (Dax song), 2020
- "Joker", 1991, by X Japan from Jealousy

== Roller coasters ==
- The Joker (Six Flags México)
- The Joker (Six Flags Discovery Kingdom)
- The Joker (S&S Worldwide)

== Science ==
- Joker butterfly (Byblia ilithyia)
- Common joker butterfly (Byblia anvatara)
  - Byblia or jokers, a genus of brush-footed butterflies
- Joker moth (Feralia jocosa)
- Loureedia phoenixi, the Joker spider

== Sports ==
- Adelaide Jokers, an ice hockey team in South Australia
- Jokers de Cergy-Pontoise, an ice hockey team in Cergy-Pontoise, France
- Georgia Joker, term for a fan at Georgia Bulldogs football games, in American college football
- Helsingin Jokerit or Jokers, a Finnish ice hockey team
  - FC Jokerit, a Finnish association football club
  - Jokerit FC (2012)
- KK Joker, a Serbian basketball club
- Medical joker, temporary replacement for an injured player
- Team Joker, a Norwegian cycling team

== Transportation ==
- FreeX Joker, a German paraglider design
- Honda Joker, a scooter made from 1996 to 1999
- Peña Joker, a French amateur-built aircraft design
- Joker, an edition of the Volkswagen Golf Mk3
- Joker, an edition of the Volkswagen Westfalia Camper

== Other uses ==
- Joker (store), a Norwegian convenience store chain
- VF-20, a World War II US Navy squadron, nicknamed The Jokers
- Joker, a pricing game on the game show The Price Is Right
- Joker (TV series), Iranian reality television series
- Dragon Quest Monsters: Joker, 2006 video game

== See also ==
- Joker! Joker!! Joker!!!, a once-a-week version of the American gameshow The Joker's Wild (1979–1981)
- Comedian (disambiguation)
- Comic (disambiguation)
- Dzhokhar (disambiguation)
- Impractical Joker (disambiguation)
- Jokester (disambiguation)
- Jester (disambiguation)
- Joke (disambiguation)
- Practical joker (disambiguation)
- Joker's Wild (disambiguation)
- Joker 2 (disambiguation)
