= List of Saber Interactive games =

This is a list of all video games by Saber Interactive.

== Games published ==
Title	Platform(s)	Release date	Developer(s)	Publisher	Ref.
Will Rock	Microsoft Windows	June 9, 2003	Saber Interactive	Ubi Soft	
TimeShift	Microsoft Windows	October 30, 2007	Saber Interactive	Sierra Entertainment	
TimeShift	PlayStation 3	October 30, 2007	Saber Interactive	Sierra Entertainment	
TimeShift	Xbox 360	October 30, 2007	Saber Interactive	Sierra Entertainment	
Battle: Los Angeles	Microsoft Windows	March 11, 2011	Live Action Studios	Konami	
Battle: Los Angeles	Xbox Live Arcade	March 11, 2011	Live Action Studios	Konami	
Battle: Los Angeles	Xbox Live Arcade	March 22, 2011	Live Action Studios	Konami	
Halo: Combat Evolved Anniversary	Xbox 360	November 15, 2011	343 Industries, Bungie, Saber Interactive	Microsoft Studios	
Inversion	PlayStation 3	June 5, 2012	Saber Saint Petersburg	Namco Bandai Games	
Inversion	Xbox 360	June 5, 2012	Saber Saint Petersburg	Namco Bandai Games	
Inversion	Microsoft Windows	July 26, 2012	Saber Saint Petersburg	Namco Bandai Games	
God Mode	Microsoft Windows	April 19, 2013	Old School Games	Atlus	
God Mode	Xbox Live Arcade	April 19, 2013	Old School Games	Atlus	
God Mode	PlayStation Network	April 23, 2013	Old School Games	Atlus	
R.I.P.D. The Game	Microsoft Windows	July 17, 2013	Old School Games	Atlus	
R.I.P.D. The Game	PlayStation 3	July 17, 2013	Old School Games	Atlus	
R.I.P.D. The Game	Xbox 360	July 17, 2013	Old School Games	Atlus	
Halo: The Master Chief Collection	Xbox One	November 11, 2014	343 Industries, Saber Interactive, Certain Affinity, United Front Games, Blur Studio	Microsoft Studios	
FIE Swordplay	Android	July 28, 2016	My.com, Saber Saint Petersburg, Pestel Crew	International Fencing Federation	
FIE Swordplay	iOS	July 28, 2016	My.com, Saber Saint Petersburg, Pestel Crew	International Fencing Federation	
MX Nitro	Microsoft Windows	February 14, 2017	Saber Interactive	Miniclip	
MX Nitro	PlayStation 4	February 14, 2017	Saber Interactive	Miniclip	
MX Nitro	Xbox One	February 14, 2017	Saber Interactive	Miniclip	
NBA Playgrounds	Microsoft Windows	May 9, 2017	Saber Madrid, Saber Saint Petersburg	Mad Dog Games	
NBA Playgrounds	PlayStation 4	May 9, 2017	Saber Madrid, Saber Saint Petersburg	Mad Dog Games	
NBA Playgrounds	Xbox One	May 9, 2017	Saber Madrid, Saber Saint Petersburg	Mad Dog Games	
World of Speed	Microsoft Windows	August 22, 2017	Redemption Ark, Saber Interactive	Mad Dog Games	
Spintires: MudRunner	Microsoft Windows	October 31, 2017	Saber Interactive	Focus Home Interactive	
Spintires: MudRunner	PlayStation 4	October 31, 2017	Saber Interactive	Focus Home Interactive	
Spintires: MudRunner	Xbox One	October 31, 2017	Saber Interactive	Focus Home Interactive	
NBA Playgrounds: Enhanced Edition	Nintendo Switch	January 4, 2018	Saber Madrid, Saber Saint Petersburg	Saber Interactive	
Armored Warfare	PlayStation 4	February 20, 2018	Saber Interactive	My.com	
World of Warriors	PlayStation 4	March 21, 2018	Saber Interactive	Sony Online Entertainment	
Shaq Fu: A Legend Reborn	Microsoft Windows	June 5, 2018	Big Deez Productions	Mad Dog Games	
Shaq Fu: A Legend Reborn	Nintendo Switch	June 5, 2018	Big Deez Productions	Mad Dog Games	
Shaq Fu: A Legend Reborn	PlayStation 4	June 5, 2018	Big Deez Productions	Mad Dog Games	
Shaq Fu: A Legend Reborn	Xbox One	June 5, 2018	Big Deez Productions	Mad Dog Games	
Armored Warfare	Xbox One	August 2, 2018	Saber Interactive	My.com	
NBA 2K Playgrounds 2	Microsoft Windows	October 16, 2018	Saber Interactive	2K Sports	
NBA 2K Playgrounds 2	Nintendo Switch	October 16, 2018	Saber Interactive	2K Sports	
NBA 2K Playgrounds 2	PlayStation 4	October 16, 2018	Saber Interactive	2K Sports	
NBA 2K Playgrounds 2	Xbox One	October 16, 2018	Saber Interactive	2K Sports	
Bass Pro Shops: The Strike - Championship Edition	Nintendo Switch	October 23, 2018	Saber Interactive	Planet Entertainment	
Cabela's The Hunt: Championship Edition	Nintendo Switch	October 23, 2018	Saber Interactive	Planet Entertainment	
Road Redemption	Nintendo Switch	November 6, 2018	Saber Interactive	Tripwire Interactive	
Road Redemption	PlayStation 4	November 6, 2018	Saber Interactive	Tripwire Interactive	
Spintires: MudRunner - American Wilds	Nintendo Switch	November 27, 2018	Saber Interactive	Focus Home Interactive	
Road Redemption	Xbox One	December 19, 2018	Saber Interactive	Tripwire Interactive	
World War Z	Microsoft Windows	April 16, 2019	Saber Saint Petersburg	Mad Dog Games	
World War Z	PlayStation 4	April 16, 2019	Saber Saint Petersburg	Mad Dog Games	
World War Z	Xbox One	April 16, 2019	Saber Saint Petersburg	Mad Dog Games	
Ghostbusters: The Video Game Remastered	Microsoft Windows	October 4, 2019	Saber Interactive	Mad Dog Games	
Ghostbusters: The Video Game Remastered	Nintendo Switch	October 4, 2019	Saber Interactive	Mad Dog Games	
Ghostbusters: The Video Game Remastered	PlayStation 4	October 4, 2019	Saber Interactive	Mad Dog Games	
Ghostbusters: The Video Game Remastered	Xbox One	October 4, 2019	Saber Interactive	Mad Dog Games	
Call of Cthulhu	Nintendo Switch	October 8, 2019	Saber Interactive	Focus Home Interactive	
The Witcher 3: Wild Hunt - Complete Edition	Nintendo Switch	October 15, 2019	Saber Interactive	CD Projekt	
Vampyr	Nintendo Switch	October 29, 2019	Saber Interactive	Focus Home Interactive	
MX Nitro: Unleashed	Microsoft Windows	February 27, 2020	Saber Interactive	Mad Dog Games	
MX Nitro: Unleashed	Nintendo Switch	February 27, 2020	Saber Interactive	Mad Dog Games	
MX Nitro: Unleashed	PlayStation 4	February 27, 2020	Saber Interactive	Mad Dog Games	
MX Nitro: Unleashed	Xbox One	February 27, 2020	Saber Interactive	Mad Dog Games	
MX Nitro: Unleashed - City	Microsoft Windows	February 27, 2020	Saber Interactive	Mad Dog Games	
MX Nitro: Unleashed - City	Nintendo Switch	February 27, 2020	Saber Interactive	Mad Dog Games	
MX Nitro: Unleashed - City	PlayStation 4	February 27, 2020	Saber Interactive	Mad Dog Games	
MX Nitro: Unleashed - City	Xbox One	February 27, 2020	Saber Interactive	Mad Dog Games	
Halo: Combat Evolved - Anniversary	Microsoft Windows	March 3, 2020	343 Industries, Saber Interactive	Xbox Game Studios	
SnowRunner	Microsoft Windows	April 28, 2020	Saber Interactive	Focus Home Interactive	
SnowRunner	PlayStation 4	April 28, 2020	Saber Interactive	Focus Home Interactive	
SnowRunner	Xbox One	April 28, 2020	Saber Interactive	Focus Home Interactive	
Halo 2: Anniversary	Microsoft Windows	May 12, 2020	343 Industries, Saber Interactive	Xbox Game Studios	
Halo 3	Microsoft Windows	July 13, 2020	343 Industries, Saber Interactive	Xbox Game Studios	
MudRunner	Android	July 17, 2020	Saber Interactive, SmartPhone Labs	Focus Home Interactive	
MudRunner	iOS	July 17, 2020	Saber Interactive, SmartPhone Labs	Focus Home Interactive	
Crysis Remastered	Nintendo Switch	July 27, 2020	Saber Porto	Crytek	
Crysis Remastered	Microsoft Windows	September 18, 2020	Saber Porto	Crytek	
Crysis Remastered	PlayStation 4	September 18, 2020	Saber Porto	Crytek	
Crysis Remastered	Xbox One	September 18, 2020	Saber Porto	Crytek	
WWE 2K Battlegrounds	Microsoft Windows	September 18, 2020	Saber Madrid	2K	
WWE 2K Battlegrounds	Nintendo Switch	September 18, 2020	Saber Madrid	2K	
WWE 2K Battlegrounds	PlayStation 4	September 18, 2020	Saber Madrid	2K	
WWE 2K Battlegrounds	Xbox One	September 18, 2020	Saber Madrid	2K	
Halo 3: ODST	Microsoft Windows	September 22, 2020	343 Industries, Saber Interactive	Xbox Game Studios	
Halo 4	Microsoft Windows	November 16, 2020	343 Industries, Saber Interactive	Xbox Game Studios	
Crysis Remastered	PlayStation 5	April 7, 2021	Saber Porto	Crytek	
Crysis Remastered	Xbox Series X/S	April 7, 2021	Saber Porto	Crytek	
SnowRunner	Nintendo Switch	May 18, 2021	Saber Interactive	Focus Home Interactive	
World War Z: Aftermath	Microsoft Windows	September 21, 2021	Saber Interactive	Focus Entertainment	
World War Z: Aftermath	PlayStation 4	September 21, 2021	Saber Interactive	Focus Entertainment	
World War Z: Aftermath	Xbox One	September 21, 2021	Saber Interactive	Focus Entertainment	
Phoenix Point: Behemoth Edition	PlayStation 4	October 1, 2021	Snapshot Games, Saber Minsk	Prime Matter	
Phoenix Point: Behemoth Edition	Xbox One	October 1, 2021	Snapshot Games, Saber Minsk	Prime Matter	
Crysis 2 Remastered	Microsoft Windows	October 15, 2021	Saber Porto	Crytek	
Crysis 2 Remastered	Nintendo Switch	October 15, 2021	Saber Porto	Crytek	
Crysis 2 Remastered	PlayStation 4	October 15, 2021	Saber Porto	Crytek	
Crysis 2 Remastered	PlayStation 5	October 15, 2021	Saber Porto	Crytek	
Crysis 2 Remastered	Xbox One	October 15, 2021	Saber Porto	Crytek	
Crysis 2 Remastered	Xbox Series X/S	October 15, 2021	Saber Porto	Crytek	
Crysis 3 Remastered	Microsoft Windows	October 15, 2021	Saber Porto	Crytek	
Crysis 3 Remastered	Nintendo Switch	October 15, 2021	Saber Porto	Crytek	
Crysis 3 Remastered	PlayStation 4	October 15, 2021	Saber Porto	Crytek	
Crysis 3 Remastered	PlayStation 5	October 15, 2021	Saber Porto	Crytek	
Crysis 3 Remastered	Xbox One	October 15, 2021	Saber Porto	Crytek	
Crysis 3 Remastered	Xbox Series X/S	October 15, 2021	Saber Porto	Crytek	
World War Z	Nintendo Switch	November 2, 2021	SmartPhone Labs	Saber Interactive Incorporated	
Phoenix Point: Behemoth Edition	PlayStation 5	December 9, 2021	Snapshot Games, Saber Minsk	Prime Matter	
Phoenix Point: Behemoth Edition	Xbox Series X/S	December 9, 2021	Snapshot Games, Saber Minsk	Prime Matter	
World War Z: Aftermath	Google Stadia	April 5, 2022	Saber Interactive	Focus Entertainment	
SlotoTerra	Android	April 21, 2022	Saber Interactive	Saber Interactive	
SlotoTerra	iOS	April 21, 2022	Saber Interactive	Saber Interactive	
Evil Dead: The Game	Microsoft Windows	May 13, 2022	Saber Madrid	Boss Team Games	
Evil Dead: The Game	PlayStation 4	May 13, 2022	Saber Madrid	Boss Team Games	
Evil Dead: The Game	PlayStation 5	May 13, 2022	Saber Madrid	Boss Team Games	
Evil Dead: The Game	Xbox One	May 13, 2022	Saber Madrid	Boss Team Games	
Evil Dead: The Game	Xbox Series X/S	May 13, 2022	Saber Madrid	Boss Team Games	
SnowRunner	PlayStation 5	May 31, 2022	Saber Interactive	Focus Entertainment	
SnowRunner	Xbox Series X/S	May 31, 2022	Saber Interactive	Focus Entertainment	
Redout 2	Microsoft Windows	June 16, 2022	34BigThings	Saber Interactive	
Redout 2	PlayStation 4	June 16, 2022	34BigThings	Saber Interactive	
Redout 2	PlayStation 5	June 16, 2022	34BigThings	Saber Interactive	
Redout 2	Xbox One	June 16, 2022	34BigThings	Saber Interactive	
Redout 2	Xbox Series X/S	June 16, 2022	34BigThings	Saber Interactive	
I, Viking	Android	June 22, 2022	Next Dimension, Steel Monkeys	Saber Interactive	
I, Viking	iOS	June 22, 2022	Next Dimension, Steel Monkeys	Saber Interactive	
Demon Dungeons: Inferno Abyss	Android	June 30, 2022	Saber Minsk	Saber Interactive	
Demon Dungeons: Inferno Abyss	iOS	June 30, 2022	Saber Minsk	Saber Interactive	
Redout 2	Nintendo Switch	July 19, 2022	34BigThings	Saber Interactive	
Quake Champions	Microsoft Windows	August 18, 2022	Id Software, Saber Interactive	Bethesda Softworks	
Circus Electrique	Microsoft Windows	September 6, 2022	Zen Studios	Saber Interactive	
Circus Electrique	Nintendo Switch	September 6, 2022	Zen Studios	Saber Interactive	
Circus Electrique	PlayStation 4	September 6, 2022	Zen Studios	Saber Interactive	
Circus Electrique	PlayStation 5	September 6, 2022	Zen Studios	Saber Interactive	
Circus Electrique	Xbox One	September 6, 2022	Zen Studios	Saber Interactive	
Circus Electrique	Xbox Series X/S	September 6, 2022	Zen Studios	Saber Interactive	
Basketball Playgrounds	Android	September 28, 2022	Saber Interactive	Saber Interactive	
DAKAR: Desert Rally	Microsoft Windows	October 4, 2022	Saber Porto	Saber Interactive	
DAKAR: Desert Rally	PlayStation 4	October 4, 2022	Saber Porto	Saber Interactive	
DAKAR: Desert Rally	PlayStation 5	October 4, 2022	Saber Porto	Saber Interactive	
DAKAR: Desert Rally	Xbox One	October 4, 2022	Saber Porto	Saber Interactive	
DAKAR: Desert Rally	Xbox Series X/S	October 4, 2022	Saber Porto	Saber Interactive	
World War Z: Aftermath	PlayStation 5	January 23, 2023	Saber Interactive	Focus Entertainment	
World War Z: Aftermath	Xbox Series X/S	January 23, 2023	Saber Interactive	Focus Entertainment	
Wild Card Football	Nintendo Switch	October 10, 2023	Saber Interactive	Saber Interactive	
Wild Card Football	PlayStation 4	October 10, 2023	Saber Interactive	Saber Interactive	
Wild Card Football	PlayStation 5	October 10, 2023	Saber Interactive	Saber Interactive	
Wild Card Football	Xbox One	October 10, 2023	Saber Interactive	Saber Interactive	
Wild Card Football	Xbox Series X/S	October 10, 2023	Saber Interactive	Saber Interactive	
Wild Card Football	Microsoft Windows	October 10, 2023	Saber Interactive	Saber Interactive	
Gloomhaven	Nintendo Switch	September 18, 2023	Saber Interactive	Asmodee Digital	
Gloomhaven	PlayStation 4	September 18, 2023	Saber Interactive	Asmodee Digital	
Gloomhaven	PlayStation 5	September 18, 2023	Saber Interactive	Asmodee Digital	
Gloomhaven	Xbox One	September 18, 2023	Saber Interactive	Asmodee Digital	
Gloomhaven	Xbox Series X/S	September 18, 2023	Saber Interactive	Asmodee Digital	
Teardown	PlayStation 5	November 15, 2023	Tuxedo Labs	Saber Interactive	
Teardown	Xbox Series X/S	November 15, 2023	Tuxedo Labs	Saber Interactive	
Tomb Raider I–III Remastered	Microsoft Windows	February 14, 2024	Aspyr, Saber Interactive	Aspyr	
Tomb Raider I–III Remastered	Nintendo Switch	February 14, 2024	Aspyr, Saber Interactive	Aspyr	
Tomb Raider I–III Remastered	PlayStation 4	February 14, 2024	Aspyr, Saber Interactive	Aspyr	
Tomb Raider I–III Remastered	PlayStation 5	February 14, 2024	Aspyr, Saber Interactive	Aspyr	
Tomb Raider I–III Remastered	Xbox One	February 14, 2024	Aspyr, Saber Interactive	Aspyr	
Tomb Raider I–III Remastered	Xbox Series X/S	February 14, 2024	Aspyr, Saber Interactive	Aspyr	
Expeditions: A MudRunner Game	Microsoft Windows	March 5, 2024	Saber Interactive	Focus Entertainment	
Expeditions: A MudRunner Game	Nintendo Switch	March 5, 2024	Saber Interactive	Focus Entertainment	
Expeditions: A MudRunner Game	PlayStation 4	March 5, 2024	Saber Interactive	Focus Entertainment	
Expeditions: A MudRunner Game	PlayStation 5	March 5, 2024	Saber Interactive	Focus Entertainment	
Expeditions: A MudRunner Game	Xbox One	March 5, 2024	Saber Interactive	Focus Entertainment	
Expeditions: A MudRunner Game	Xbox Series X/S	March 5, 2024	Saber Interactive	Focus Entertainment	
Kingdom Come: Deliverance	Nintendo Switch	March 15, 2024	Warhorse Studios	Plaion	
Heading Out	Microsoft Windows	May 7, 2024	Serious Sim	Saber Interactive	
MudRunner VR	Meta Quest 2	May 30, 2024	Saber Interactive	Saber Interactive	
MudRunner VR	Meta Quest Pro	May 30, 2024	Saber Interactive	Saber Interactive	
MudRunner VR	Meta Quest 3	May 30, 2024	Saber Interactive	Saber Interactive	
Warhammer 40,000: Space Marine 2	Microsoft Windows	September 9, 2024	Saber Saint Petersburg	Focus Entertainment	
Warhammer 40,000: Space Marine 2	PlayStation 5	September 9, 2024	Saber Saint Petersburg	Focus Entertainment	
Warhammer 40,000: Space Marine 2	Xbox Series X/S	September 9, 2024	Saber Saint Petersburg	Focus Entertainment	
Exploding Kittens VR	Meta Quest 2	October 3, 2024	Saber Interactive	Saber Interactive	
Exploding Kittens VR	Meta Quest Pro	October 3, 2024	Saber Interactive	Saber Interactive	
Exploding Kittens VR	Meta Quest 3	October 3, 2024	Saber Interactive	Saber Interactive	
A Quiet Place: The Road Ahead	Microsoft Windows	October 17, 2024	Stormind Games	Saber Interactive	
A Quiet Place: The Road Ahead	PlayStation 5	October 17, 2024	Stormind Games	Saber Interactive	
A Quiet Place: The Road Ahead	Xbox Series X/S	October 17, 2024	Stormind Games	Saber Interactive	
MudRunner VR	Microsoft Windows	October 23, 2024	Saber Interactive	Saber Interactive	
Tomb Raider IV–VI Remastered	Microsoft Windows	February 14, 2025	Aspyr, Saber Interactive	Aspyr	
Tomb Raider IV–VI Remastered	Nintendo Switch	February 14, 2025	Aspyr, Saber Interactive	Aspyr	
Tomb Raider IV–VI Remastered	PlayStation 4	February 14, 2025	Aspyr, Saber Interactive	Aspyr	
Tomb Raider IV–VI Remastered	PlayStation 5	February 14, 2025	Aspyr, Saber Interactive	Aspyr	
Tomb Raider IV–VI Remastered	Xbox One	February 14, 2025	Aspyr, Saber Interactive	Aspyr	
Tomb Raider IV–VI Remastered	Xbox Series X/S	February 14, 2025	Aspyr, Saber Interactive	Aspyr	
RoadCraft	Microsoft Windows	May 20, 2025	Saber Interactive	Focus Entertainment	
RoadCraft	PlayStation 5	May 20, 2025	Saber Interactive	Focus Entertainment	
RoadCraft	Xbox Series X/S	May 20, 2025	Saber Interactive	Focus Entertainment	
World War Z VR	Microsoft Windows	August 12, 2025	Saber Interactive	Saber Interactive	
World War Z VR	Meta Quest 2	August 12, 2025	Saber Interactive	Saber Interactive	
World War Z VR	Meta Quest Pro	August 12, 2025	Saber Interactive	Saber Interactive	
World War Z VR	Meta Quest 3	August 12, 2025	Saber Interactive	Saber Interactive	
The Knightling	Microsoft Windows	August 28, 2025	Twirlbound	Saber Interactive	
The Knightling	Nintendo Switch	August 28, 2025	Twirlbound	Saber Interactive	
The Knightling	PlayStation 5	August 28, 2025	Twirlbound	Saber Interactive	
The Knightling	Xbox Series X/S	August 28, 2025	Twirlbound	Saber Interactive	
Docked	Microsoft Windows	March 5, 2026	Saber Interactive	Saber Interactive	
Docked	PlayStation 5	March 5, 2026	Saber Interactive	Saber Interactive	
Docked	Xbox Series X/S	March 5, 2026	Saber Interactive	Saber Interactive	
John Carpenter's Toxic Commando	Microsoft Windows	March 12, 2026	Saber Interactive	Focus Entertainment	
John Carpenter's Toxic Commando	PlayStation 5	March 12, 2026	Saber Interactive	Focus Entertainment	
John Carpenter's Toxic Commando	Xbox Series X/S	March 12, 2026	Saber Interactive	Focus Entertainment	
Bus Bound	Microsoft Windows	April 30, 2026	stillalive studios	Saber Interactive	
Bus Bound	PlayStation 5	April 30, 2026	stillalive studios	Saber Interactive	
Bus Bound	Xbox Series X/S	April 30, 2026	stillalive studios	Saber Interactive	
SnowRunner	Nintendo Switch 2	June 9, 2026	Saber Interactive	Focus Entertainment	
MudRunner	PlayStation 5	August 26, 2026	Saber Interactive	Focus Entertainment	
MudRunner	Xbox Series X/S	August 26, 2026	Saber Interactive	Focus Entertainment	
Clive Barker's Hellraiser: Revival	Microsoft Windows	October 8, 2026	Saber Interactive	Saber Interactive	
Clive Barker's Hellraiser: Revival	Nintendo Switch 2	October 8, 2026	Saber Interactive	Saber Interactive	
Clive Barker's Hellraiser: Revival	PlayStation 5	October 8, 2026	Saber Interactive	Saber Interactive	
Clive Barker's Hellraiser: Revival	Xbox Series X/S	October 8, 2026	Saber Interactive	Saber Interactive	
Road Kings	Microsoft Windows	March 11, 2027	Saber Interactive	Focus Entertainment	
Road Kings	PlayStation 5	March 11, 2027	Saber Interactive	Focus Entertainment	
Road Kings	Xbox Series X/S	March 11, 2027	Saber Interactive	Focus Entertainment	
Hitman Classic Trilogy Remastered	Microsoft Windows	TBA 2027	Saber Interactive, IO Interactive	Saber Interactive	
Hitman Classic Trilogy Remastered	PlayStation 5	TBA 2027	Saber Interactive, IO Interactive	Saber Interactive	
Hitman Classic Trilogy Remastered	Xbox Series X/S	TBA 2027	Saber Interactive, IO Interactive	Saber Interactive	
Turok: Origins	Microsoft Windows	TBA 2027	Saber Interactive	Saber Interactive	
Turok: Origins	Nintendo Switch 2	TBA 2027	Saber Interactive	Saber Interactive	
Turok: Origins	PlayStation 5	TBA 2027	Saber Interactive	Saber Interactive	
Turok: Origins	Xbox Series X/S	TBA 2027	Saber Interactive	Saber Interactive	
Jurassic Park Survival	Microsoft Windows	TBA	Saber Interactive	Saber Interactive	
Jurassic Park Survival	PlayStation 5	TBA	Saber Interactive	Saber Interactive	
Jurassic Park Survival	Xbox Series X/S	TBA	Saber Interactive	Saber Interactive	
Rails of Fury: Train Defence	Android	TBA	Saber Interactive	Saber Interactive	
Rails of Fury: Train Defence	iOS	TBA	Saber Interactive	Saber Interactive	
Star Wars: Knights of the Old Republic Remake	Microsoft Windows	TBA	Saber Interactive	TBA	
Star Wars: Knights of the Old Republic Remake	PlayStation 5	TBA	Saber Interactive	TBA	
Untitled Avatar: The Last Airbender title	TBA	TBA	Saber Interactive	TBA	
Warhammer 40,000: Space Marine 3	TBA	TBA	Saber Interactive	Focus Entertainment	
Rideshare “Stimulator”	Microsoft Windows	TBA	Unigine	Saber Interactive	
Rideshare “Stimulator”	PlayStation 5	TBA	Unigine	Saber Interactive	
Rideshare “Stimulator”	Xbox Series X/S	TBA	Unigine	Saber Interactive	
Stuntman: Hollywood	Microsoft Windows	TBA	Saber Interactive	Saber Interactive	
Stuntman: Hollywood	PlayStation 5	TBA	Saber Interactive	Saber Interactive	
Stuntman: Hollywood	Xbox Series X/S	TBA	Saber Interactive	Saber Interactive	
Untitled John Wick title	Microsoft Windows	TBA	Saber Interactive	Saber Interactive	
Untitled John Wick title	PlayStation 5	TBA	Saber Interactive	Saber Interactive	
Untitled John Wick title	Xbox Series X/S	TBA	Saber Interactive	Saber Interactive	
