= Jokester (disambiguation) =

"Jokester" is a 1956 science fiction short story by Isaac Asimov.

Jokester may also refer to:

== People ==
Roles

- Jester, a court fool
- Comedian, a comic, person who tells jokes
- Practical joker, one who plays practical jokes
- Funnyman or joker, a person who frequently tells jokes

Persons

- Marlon Jackson (born 1957) nicknamed "Jokester", member of the Jackson 5

=== Fictional characters ===
- The Jokester, an alternate universe version of the DC Comics character The Joker
- The Jokester, a fictional character from the 2006 MTV TV show The Gamekillers

== Other uses ==
- Jokester (1995 song) a song by Leftover Salmon off their album Ask the Fish

== See also ==
- Practical joker (disambiguation)
- Joker (disambiguation)
- Jester (disambiguation)
- Comedian (disambiguation)
- Comic (disambiguation)
- Funny Man (disambiguation)
