= Comedian (disambiguation) =

A comedian is an entertainer who performs in a comic manner, especially by telling jokes.

Comedian or comedians may also refer to:

== Films ==
- Comedienne (film), a 1923 film
- Comedians (1925 film), a German silent film
- The Comedians (1941 film), a 1941 film
- Comedians (1954 film), a Spanish drama film
- The Comedians (1967 film), a 1967 film based on the novel by Graham Greene
- Comedian (film), a 2002 documentary focused on Jerry Seinfeld
- The Comedian (2012 film), a 2012 film
- The Comedian (2016 film), a 2016 film starring Robert De Niro
- Comedian (character), a fictional character in the 2009 film Watchmen and the graphic novel series upon which it is based

== Television ==
- The Comedian (Playhouse 90), a 1957 live drama written by Rod Serling and directed by John Frankenheimer
- The Comedians (1971 TV series), a British television show running between 1971 and 1993
- The Comedians (2015 TV series), a 2015 FX comedy starring Billy Crystal and Josh Gad
- Comedians (Beavis and Butt-Head), an episode of the TV series Beavis and Butt-Head
- "The Comedian" (The Twilight Zone), 2019 episode of the television series The Twilight Zone

== Music ==
- The Comedians (Kabalevsky), a 1940 concert suite by Dmitry Kabalevsky
- The Comedians (Glière), Op. 68, a ballet written by Reinhold Glière in 1922 and revised in 1930 and 1935, also arranged into two orchestral suites
- Eddie Murphy: Comedian, a 1983 album by American entertainer Eddie Murphy
- "Comedian", a song by Devon Welsh from the 2018 album Dream Songs
- "Comedian", a song by Telenova from the 2021 EP Tranquilize
- "The Comedians", a song by Elvis Costello from the album Goodbye Cruel World

== Others ==
- The Comedians (novel), a 1966 novel by Graham Greene
- Comedians (play), a 1975 play by Trevor Griffiths
- Comedian (character), a character from the 1986 comic book series Watchmen
- Comedian (artwork), a banana taped to a wall with duct tape by Maurizio Cattelan
- List of comedians

== See also ==
- Joker (disambiguation)
- Jester (disambiguation)
- Jokester (disambiguation)
- Practical joker (disambiguation)
- Funny Man (disambiguation)
- Comic (disambiguation)
