= RoadCraft =

- Developer: Saber Interactive
- Publisher: Focus Entertainment
- Director: Vitialiy Yaruta
- Producer: Ivan Khomenko
- Designers: Lev Danilov; Aleksei Kiriushkin
- Programmers: Ruslan Vizgalin; Evgeniy Tsyimbalyuk
- Artist: Andrey Gromov
- Writers: Andrei Paskhalov; Nathan M. Farrugia; Kim Smith
- Composers: Mikhail Kotov; Nikita Valamin; Steve Molitz; Ryan Liatsis
- Platforms: PlayStation 5; Windows; Xbox Series X/S
- Release: May 20, 2025
- Genre: Vehicle simulation
- Modes: Single-player, multiplayer

RoadCraft is a vehicle simulation video game developed by Saber Interactive and published by Focus Entertainment. It tasks players to manage construction operations in sites previously ravaged by natural disasters using a variety of heavy equipment vehicles.

== Gameplay ==
RoadCraft is a vehicle simulation game. In the game, the player character is in charge of a construction company specializing in natural disaster recovery. The game features 40 different heavy equipment vehicles, which can be used for damage assessment, debris removal, transport of materials, infrastructure repair, and reconstruction of damaged bridges and roads. Debris can be recycled, turning them into materials for reconstruction. Players can manually operate each vehicle, though tasks can also be automated to enhance efficiency, with the player plotting the routes of each vehicle. The game featured eight maps at launch, and supports four-player cooperative multiplayer.

== Development ==
The game was developed by Saber Interactive, the studio behind MudRunner, Expeditions: A MudRunner Game and SnowRunner. RoadCraft was announced in August 2024. The game was released for PlayStation 5, Windows and Xbox Series X/S on May 20, 2025. Players who purchased the physical edition of the game will receive an additional vehicle, the Aramatsu Bowhead 30T, for free.

A paid expansion for the game titled Rebuild was released in September 2025, alongside a free update that introduced additional difficulty options.

== Reception ==
Reception

Aggregate scores
Aggregator	Score
Metacritic	(PC) 78/100 (PS5) 78/100 (XSXS) 85/100
OpenCritic	78% recommend

Review scores
Publication	Score
Hardcore Gamer	4/5
PCGamesN	9/10
Push Square	8/10
Shacknews	8/10
VG247	4/5

RoadCraft received "generally favorable" reviews, according to review aggregator website Metacritic. Fellow review aggregator OpenCritic assessed that the game received strong approval, being recommended by 78% of critics.
