= Practical joker =

Practical joker, or Practical jokers may refer to:

- Someone who plays a practical joke, setting up a situation to produce a humorous physical outcome at the expense of a target
- "The Practical Joker", an episode of the animated television series Star Trek
- Practical Jokers, a 1938 comedy short film
- "The Practical Joker", an episode of The Adventures of Ozzie and Harriet
- "The Practical Joker", an episode of Zorro (1957 TV series)
- "The Practical Joker", an episode of The Hathaways
- "The Practical Joker", an episode of Deadly Games

== See also ==
- Comedian (disambiguation)
- Comic (disambiguation)
- Impractical Joker (disambiguation)
- Joker (disambiguation)
- Jester (disambiguation)
- Jokester (disambiguation)
- Prankster (disambiguation)
