= Jester (comics) =

Jester, in comics, may refer to:

- Jester (DC Comics), two characters:
  - Jester (Quality Comics), Chuck Lane, a Quality Comics character who has also appeared in DC Comics
  - Jester, Charles Lane his fictional grandson, a DC Comics character
- Jester (Marvel Comics), a number of Marvel Comics characters
- Jester, a Wildstorm Comics character who has appeared in Wetworks (comics)

== See also ==
- Jester (disambiguation)
