= Spintires =

2014 video game

- Developer: Pavel Zagrebelnyy
- Publishers: Oovee Game Studios, IMGN
- Platform: Microsoft Windows
- Release: June 13, 2014
- Genre: Vehicle simulation
- Modes: Single-player, multiplayer

Spintires is a 2014 off-roading simulation video game by developer Pavel Zagrebelnyy. In Spintires, players take control of off-road vehicles and drive them through muddy off-road terrain to complete objectives. The game was released on June 13, 2014, and has sold over one million copies. A spin-off game called MudRunner was released on October 30, 2017.

== Gameplay ==
An example of gameplay in Spintires with the Truck B-130

Spintires is an all-terrain simulation video game which tasks driving through muddy unpaved Russian roads in aging Soviet vehicles with nothing but a map and a compass. The aim of the game is to transport cargo to its destination without depleting resources (such as fuel) or damaging the vehicle. There is both a single-player and multiplayer mode.

The game takes into account several properties such as physics, mud, terrain deformation, as well as driving controls and a day/night cycle. Due to the challenging terrain, players must take all conditions into consideration and drive accordingly; for example, they cannot simply just press "forward" on their keyboard to drive straight.

Players can choose between casual and hardcore mode. In hardcore mode, fuel consumption is increased and routes the player charts on the map will not be displayed as a guide on the road as they drive. The game's camera is positioned outside the vehicle and can be moved around using the mouse; there is no in-car view.

== Development ==
Development was preceded by a demo game made by Pavel Zagrebelnyy for the 2008 Intel Level Up game development competition, where the game won the first prize in the 'Best Multithreaded Game' category and finished second in the 'best game optimized for Intel graphics' category.

The game initially raised $82,684 on Kickstarter in 2013. A few days following its release, Spintires briefly became the top-selling video game on the Steam platform, and a month after it still retained a position in the Steam Top 10, selling over 100,000 copies. In 2014, developer Zagrebelny alleged that Oovee took the money and cut off communication, which left him unable to update it. Oovee, however, has denied the allegations, saying Zagrebelnyy has been paid in full for the work he completed and that there is no breach of contract on the side of Oovee. Later, both Oovee and Zagrebelnyy attributed the dispute to "communications issues", and said that an eventual sequel to Spintires was a possibility.

In December 2015, Oovee opened up the game to its player base with Steam Workshop support, seeing the release of its truck and map editor. A news post on the Spintires Steam page by Oovee, suggested that Spintires was not over as many had suggested, and showed signs of further graphical improvements and additions to gameplay.

Throughout 2019, Spintires has received numerous updates including fixes, graphical enhancements and DLC.

As of 2022, the game is no longer available for purchase from Steam due to copyright disputes.

== Release and reception ==
Spintires was released on June 13, 2014, and had sold more than 100,000 copies by July. Spintires has received mixed reviews. Christian Donlan of Eurogamer placed Spintires onto the site's "Games of 2014", writing, "Spintires can make a set-piece out of a puddle. Spintires can make precisely zero mph feel like knuckle-splintering stuff. Spintires is a roguelike in which you load the game up, roll a wheeled character, and see how far you can get on a single tank of gas", and that it was "ugly but beautiful, and fixated with the beauty of ugliness."

Andy Kelly, for PC Gamer, scored Spintires 60/100, commending the game's gameplay and variety of vehicles. However, he also found fault with the game's limited scope and camera system, writing, "[...] as endearingly bizarre as I find Spintires, and as much as I admire the technology, I can't say I really ever enjoyed it. There are moments of what I could loosely call excitement—like almost rolling over and spilling my load just metres from the delivery point, or thinking I was crossing a shallow pond only to become totally submersed in a river—but they're few and far between. Mostly I just find myself swearing at mud." James Cunningham in Hardcore Gamer praised the game, stating, "[...] Spintires is a game that wants people to play rather than work. The great outdoors is big and beautiful, and the maps have plenty of personality and memorable locations, but they're also the enemy. The inviting gameplay and lovely scenery make it easy to underestimate what an unforgiving bastard the great outdoors can be, but it only takes getting irretrievably stuck a couple of times before that illusion gets shattered. After that it's time to stomp the scenery flat with the biggest earth-gouging, fume belching trucks Spintires has to offer."

Phil Hartup of New Statesman rated Spintires as the video game with the Best Visuals of 2014, claiming, "What I saw in Spintires was mud. The best mud I have ever seen in a game. I saw mud that splattered and squelched and I saw water that flowed around in the treads of the tyres of my truck and pooled in the mud furrows. I would stare at it, and not just because I was often hopelessly stuck. It might be a low key game about trucks and trees, but there are a lot that other games should learn from Spintires."

== Sequel ==
In 2015, Zegrebelnyy started working at Saber Interactive, a former employer of his, to aid development of MudRunner. and Oovee licensed the game to Saber Interactive. SnowRunner, sequel to MudRunner, was released in 2020. At Gamescom 2023, a new game called Expeditions: A MudRunner Game was announced. The game was released on March 5, 2024. A VR game titled MudRunner VR was also released on May 30, 2024.
