= Joker's Wild =

Joker's Wild or Jokers Wild may refer to:

- Joker (playing card), when used as a Wild card
- Joker's Wild (film), an American 2016 horror thriller film starring Eric Roberts
- The Joker's Wild, an American TV game show
- Jokers Wild (TV series), a British comedy panel show
- "Joker's Wild" (Batman: The Animated Series), a 1992 episode of Batman: The Animated Series
- Jokers Wild (novel), a 1987 novel in the Wild Cards series by George R. R. Martin
- Jokers Wild (band), a 1960s British blues-rock band
- Joker's Wild (quartet), an American barbershop quartet
- "The Joker's Wild", a song by Insane Clown Posse from Riddle Box
- Jokers Wild Casino, a former casino in Henderson, Nevada, U.S.
- Joker's Wild, a wrestling tournament promoted by TNA One Night Only
- The Joker Is Wild 1957 film directed by Charles Vidor
- Jokers Wild, an American 2025 short film, starring David Howard Thornton

== See also ==
- Jokers in Solitaire
- Joker (disambiguation)
- Wild card (disambiguation)
