= Prankster =

A prankster is a person who enjoys playing pranks.

Prankster may also refer to:

- Prankster (Charlton Comics), a short-lived comic book super hero
- Prankster (comics), a DC Comics supervillain
- The Prankster (film), a 2010 teen comedy
- Fazbear Frights 11: Prankster, a 2021 book by Scott Cawthon

== See also ==
- Trickster (disambiguation)
