= Joker (nickname) =

Joker is a nickname of the following people:

- Joker Arroyo (1927–2015), Filipino lawyer, politician and senator
- Jonas Berggren (born 1967), Swedish musician
- Novak Djokovic (born 1987), Serbian tennis player
- Alec Hall (Australian footballer) (1869–1933), Australian rules footballer
- Nikola Jokić (born 1995), Serbian basketball player
- Jess Liaudin (born 1973), French mixed martial artist
- Joker Phillips (born 1963), American former football player and coach
- Joe Randa (born 1969), American retired Major League Baseball player
- Yong Jun-hyung (born 1989), South Korean pop singer
- Mac Jones (born 1998), American football quarterback

== See also ==
- Joker (disambiguation)
