= Comedy (disambiguation) =

Comedy is a genre of literary works that have happy endings, in contrast to tragedies that have unhappy endings.

Comedy may also refer to:

- Comedy (drama), in the performing arts
- Comedy album
- Comedy film
- Comedy music
- Radio comedy
- Sketch comedy
- Television comedy
- Humour
- Stand-up comedy

== Film and television ==
- Comedy (2002 film), a 2002 animated short film
- The Comedy Network, a Canadian specialty channel
- ABC Comedy, the former name of Australian television channel ABC Family (Australian TV channel)
- "Comedy" (Stewart Lee's Comedy Vehicle), a TV episode

== Music ==
- Comedy (Black album), 1988
- Comedy (Paul Kelly & The Messengers album), 1991
- "Comedy", a 2021 song by Bo Burnham from the special Bo Burnham: Inside
- Comedy (song), a 2022 song by Gen Hoshino

== See also ==
- The Comedy (disambiguation)
- Comedic genres
