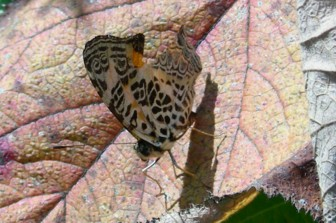

Scientific classification
- Kingdom: Animalia
- Phylum: Arthropoda
- Clade: Pancrustacea
- Class: Insecta
- Order: Lepidoptera
- Family: Nymphalidae
- Genus: Symbrenthia
- Species: S. hypselis

Binomial name
- Symbrenthia hypselis (Godart, 1824)

= Symbrenthia hypselis =

Himalayan jester

Species of butterfly

Symbrenthia hypselis, the Himalayan jester, is a species of nymphalid butterfly found in South Asia, and some islands in South East Asia (Sumatra, Java)

== See also ==
- List of butterflies of India (Nymphalidae)
