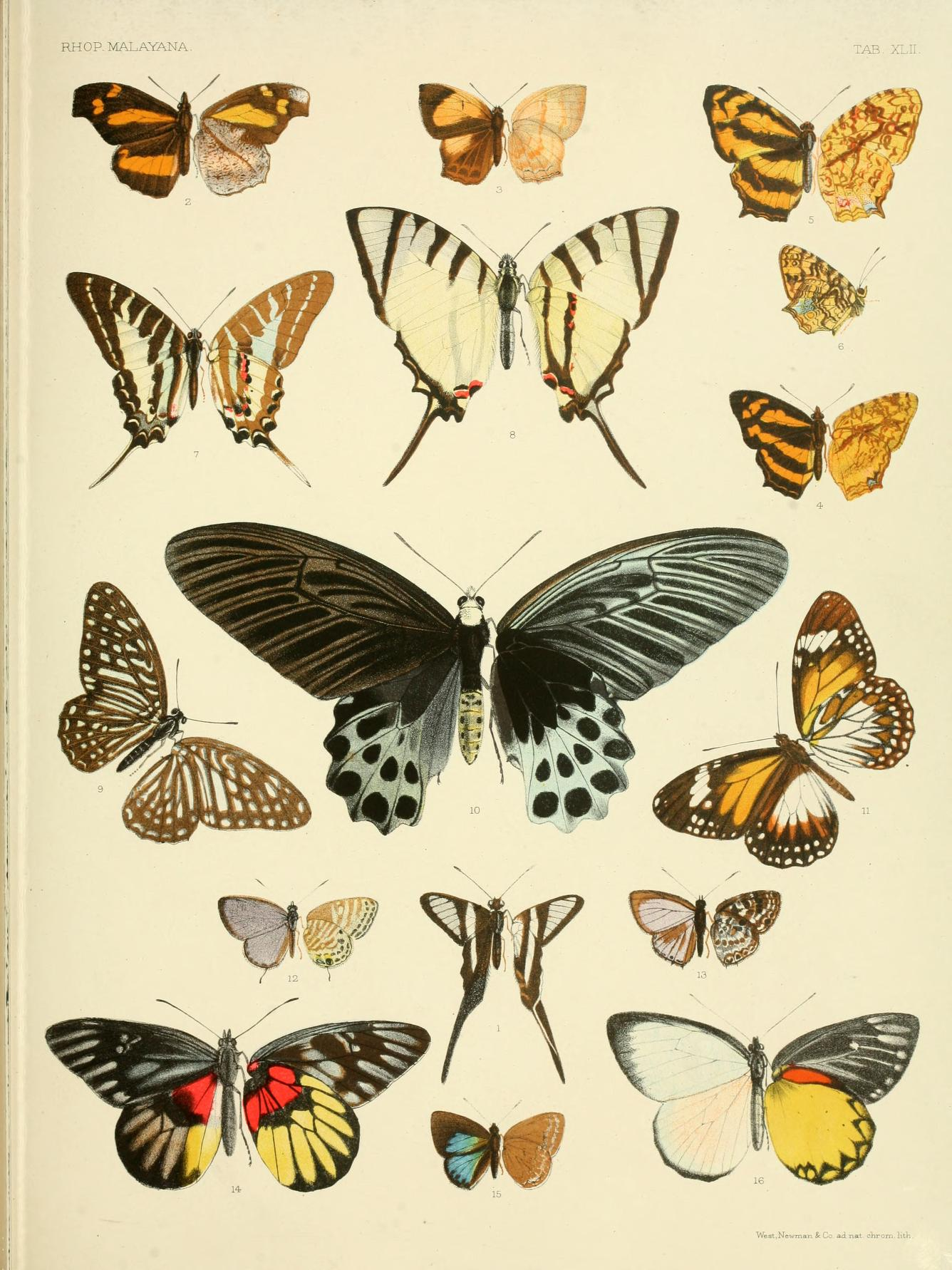
- Figure 6, in Rhopalocera Malayana

Scientific classification
- Kingdom: Animalia
- Phylum: Arthropoda
- Clade: Pancrustacea
- Class: Insecta
- Order: Lepidoptera
- Family: Nymphalidae
- Genus: Symbrenthia
- Species: S. hypatia

Binomial name
- Symbrenthia hypatia (Wallace, 1869)

Synonyms
- Laogona hypatia Wallace, 1869; Symbrenthia hypatia var. chersonesia Fruhstorfer, 1894; Symbrenthia hyptia var. hippocrene Staudinger, [1897]

= Symbrenthia hypatia =

Species of butterfly

Symbrenthia hypatia is an Indomalayan nyphaline butterfly found in Thailand, Peninsular Malaya, Java, Sumatra, Borneo and the Philippines.

== Subspecies ==
- Symbrenthia hypatia hypatia
- Symbrenthia hypatia chersonesia Fruhstorfer, 1894 (Malacca)
- Symbrenthia hypatia hippocrene Staudinger, [1897] (Borneo)
