= Wild card =

Wild card most commonly refers to:

- Wild card (cards), a playing card that substitutes for any other card in card games
- Wild card (sports), a tournament or playoff place awarded to an individual or team that has not qualified through normal play

Wild card, wild cards or wildcard may also refer to:

== Computing ==
- Matching wildcards or globbing, an algorithm for comparing text with wildcard characters
- Wildcard character, a character that substitutes for any other character or character range in regular expressions and globbing
- Wildcard DNS record, a record in a DNS zone file that will match all requests for non-existent domain names
- Wildcard mask, a netmask that swaps 1 to 0 and 0 to 1 compared to the normal netmask
- Wildcard certificate, a public key certificate used to secure multiple subdomains
- Wildcard (Java), a special actual type parameter for generic instantiations in the Java programming language
- Studio Wildcard, an American video game developer best known for Ark: Survival Evolved

== Books ==
- Wild Cards, an anthology series of science fiction superhero books
  - Wild Cards, the first installment of Wild Cards books and short stories
- Wildcard (G.I. Joe), a fictional character in the G.I. Joe universe
- Wildcard, the sequel to Warcross by Marie Lu
- Wildcard, two DC Comics characters in stories featuring the Royal Flush Gang
  - Hector Hammond, the first Wildcard
  - Amos Fortune (character), the second Wildcard

== Film and television ==
- Wild Card (2003 film), a 2003 South Korean action film
- Wild Card (2015 film), an American crime drama film
- Wild Card (TV series), a.k.a. Zoe Busiek: Wild Card, a Canadian TV series starring Joely Fisher
- Wild Cards (TV series), a 2024 Canadian/American police procedural TV series
- "Wild Cards", an episode of Justice League
- "Wild Cards", an episode of The King of Queens

== Music ==
- Wildcard, imprint of Polydor Records
- The Wild Card, a 2020 album by Ledisip
- Wild Card (ReVamp album), 2013
- Wild Card (The Rippingtons album), 2005
- Wild Card (The Warratahs album), 1990
- Wildcard (Terence Trent D'Arby album), 2001
- Wildcard (Miranda Lambert album), 2019
- Wildcard, an album by Ridley Bent 2014
- Wildcard (EP), a 1989 EP by Pennywise
- Wildcard / A Word from the Wise, compilation album by Pennywise
- "Wildcard", song by Kshmr
- "Wild Card", a 2014 song by Hunter Hayes from Storyline

== Other uses ==
- Wild Card (lottery), a lottery game played in Idaho, Montana, North Dakota, and South Dakota
- Wild card (foresight), low-probability, high-impact events
- Wild card (linguistics), letters or symbols used to cover broad classes of sounds
- Wild Card, the antagonist of NFL Rush Zone season 2
- Wild Card (video game), a 2001 role-playing video game
- Wild Card Football, a 2023 arcade-style football video game by Saber Interactive

== See also ==
- Wild Cardz, a manga series and anime
- Wild Card Series, previously Wild Card Games, used in the Major League Baseball postseason since 2012
- Wyldcard, American musician
