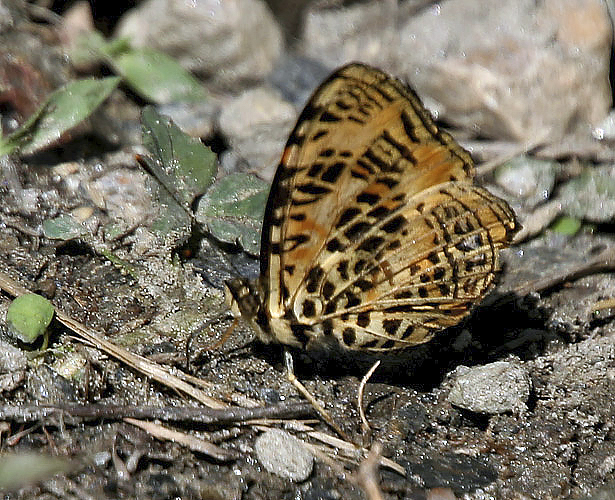

Scientific classification
- Domain: Eukaryota
- Kingdom: Animalia
- Phylum: Arthropoda
- Class: Insecta
- Order: Lepidoptera
- Family: Nymphalidae
- Genus: Symbrenthia
- Species: S. niphanda

Binomial name
- Symbrenthia niphanda Moore, 1872

= Symbrenthia niphanda =

Bluetail jester

Species of butterfly

Symbrenthia niphanda, the bluetail jester, is a species of nymphalid butterfly found in South Asia. (Kashmir, Assam, Yunnan)

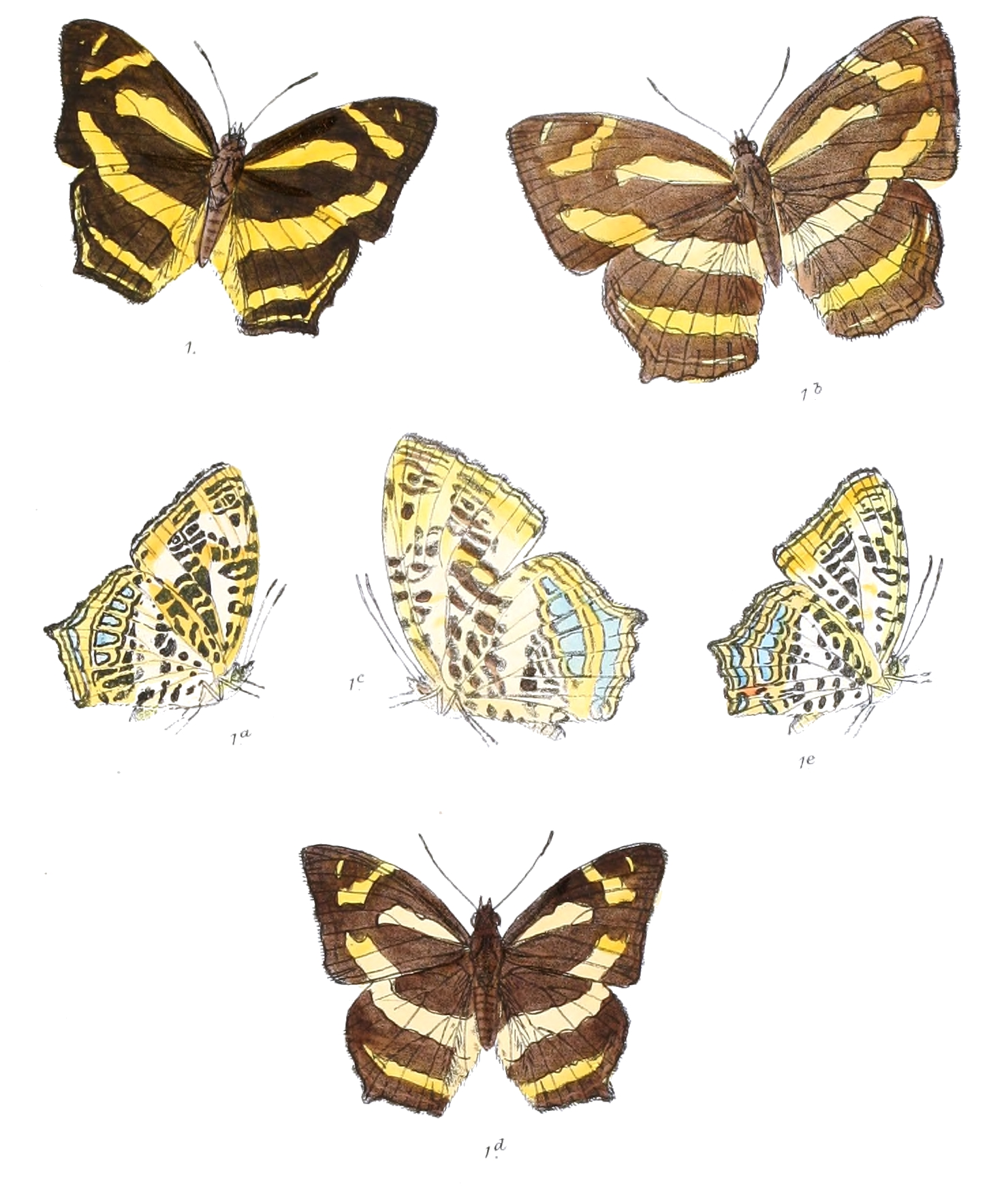
