= Funny Girl =

Funny Girl may refer to:

- Funny Girl (musical), 1964 Broadway musical with score by Jule Styne and Bob Merrill, which starred Barbra Streisand
  - Funny Girl (Original Broadway Cast Recording), 1964 album of the stage musical
  - Funny Girl (New Broadway Cast Recording), 2022 album of the stage musical revival
- Funny Girl (film), 1968 film based on the stage musical
  - Funny Girl (soundtrack), soundtrack album to the 1968 musical film
  - "Funny Girl" (Barbra Streisand song), 1968 song from the film sung by Barbra Streisand
- Funny Girl (Fiona album), 2005 album by Cantopop artist Fiona Sit
- Funny Girl (novel), 2014 novel by Nick Hornby
- "Funny Girl" (Laura Rizzotto song), 2017 song that represented Latvia in the Eurovision Song Contest 2018
- Funny Girls (burlesque bar), a burlesque cabaret bar in Blackpool, Lancashire, England, UK
- Funny Girls (TV series), New Zealand comedy television series airing from 2016–2018
- "Funny Girl", 2022 song by Father John Misty from the album Chloë and the Next 20th Century

== See also ==
- Comedienne
- Funny Man (disambiguation)
- Girls (disambiguation)
- Girl (disambiguation)
