= Impractical Joker =

Impractical Jokers is an American hidden camera reality TV series

Impractical Joker or Impractical Jokers may refer to:

- The Impractical Joker, a 1937 animated short starring Betty Boop
- "The Impractical Joker" (Garfield and Friends), a television episode
- The Tenderloins, often referred to as the Impractical Jokers, the stars of the American hidden camera reality TV series
- Impractical Jokers UK, a British adaptation of the American TV series
- Impractical Jokers: The Movie, a 2020 American comedy film based on the TV series

== See also ==
- Practical joker (disambiguation)
- Joker (disambiguation)
