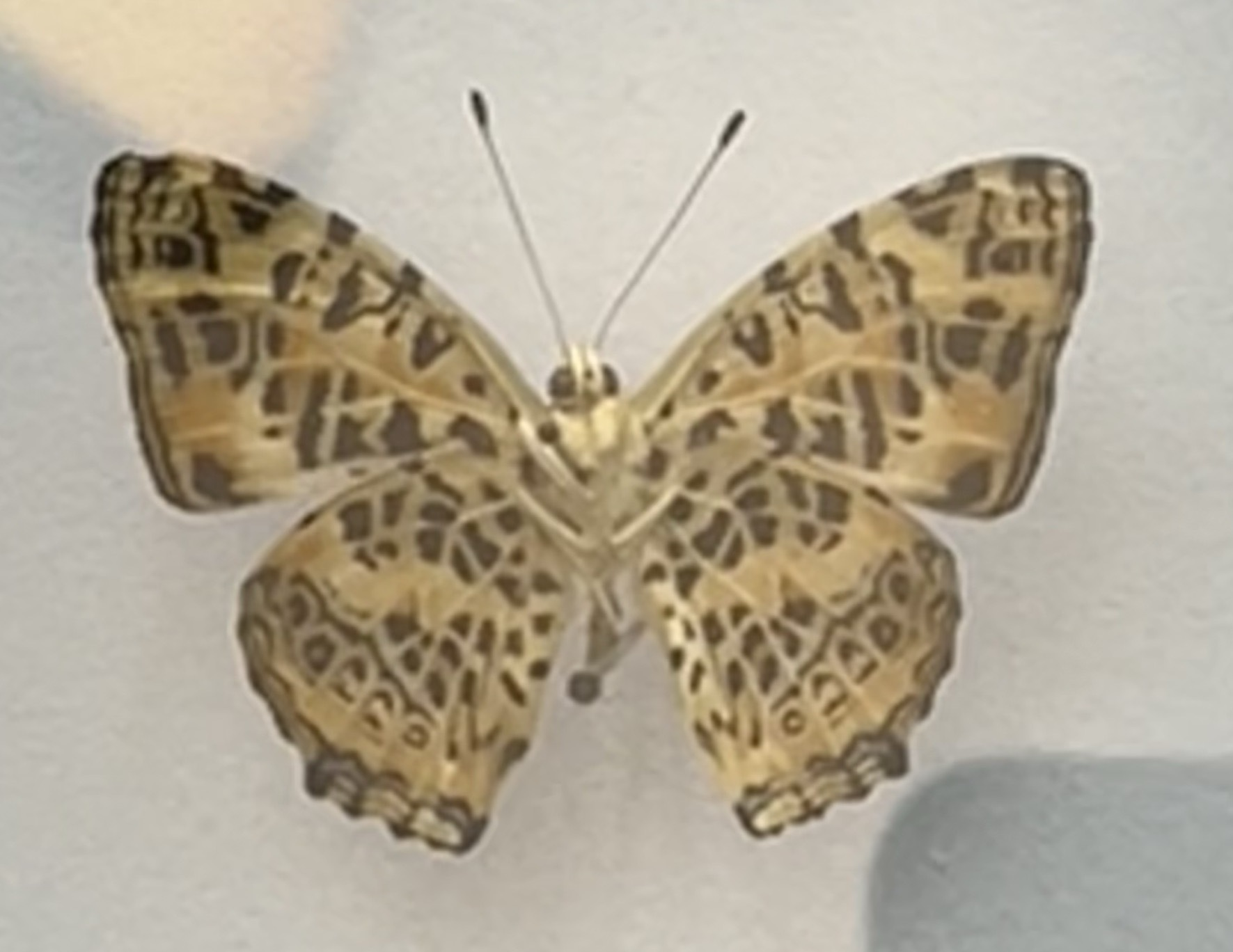

Scientific classification
- Kingdom: Animalia
- Phylum: Arthropoda
- Class: Insecta
- Order: Lepidoptera
- Family: Nymphalidae
- Genus: Symbrenthia
- Species: S. brabira

Binomial name
- Symbrenthia brabira Moore, 1872

= Symbrenthia brabira =

Species of butterfly

Symbrenthia brabira is a nyphaline butterfly found in India, Nepal, Bhutan, Taiwan and China.

== Description ==
Like that of many tropical butterflies, the wing patterning of Symbrenthia brabira butterflies varies between wet season and dry season forms.

The wings of wet-season males are fulvous-black with reddish-yellow bands on the upper-side. The underside are almost uniformly bright ochreous-yellow with small tessellated markings. It has conical spots on the submargin of the hindwings which are sparsely speckled with metallic-green scales. The marginal lunules (crescent-shaped markings) are continuous and also speckled metallic green.

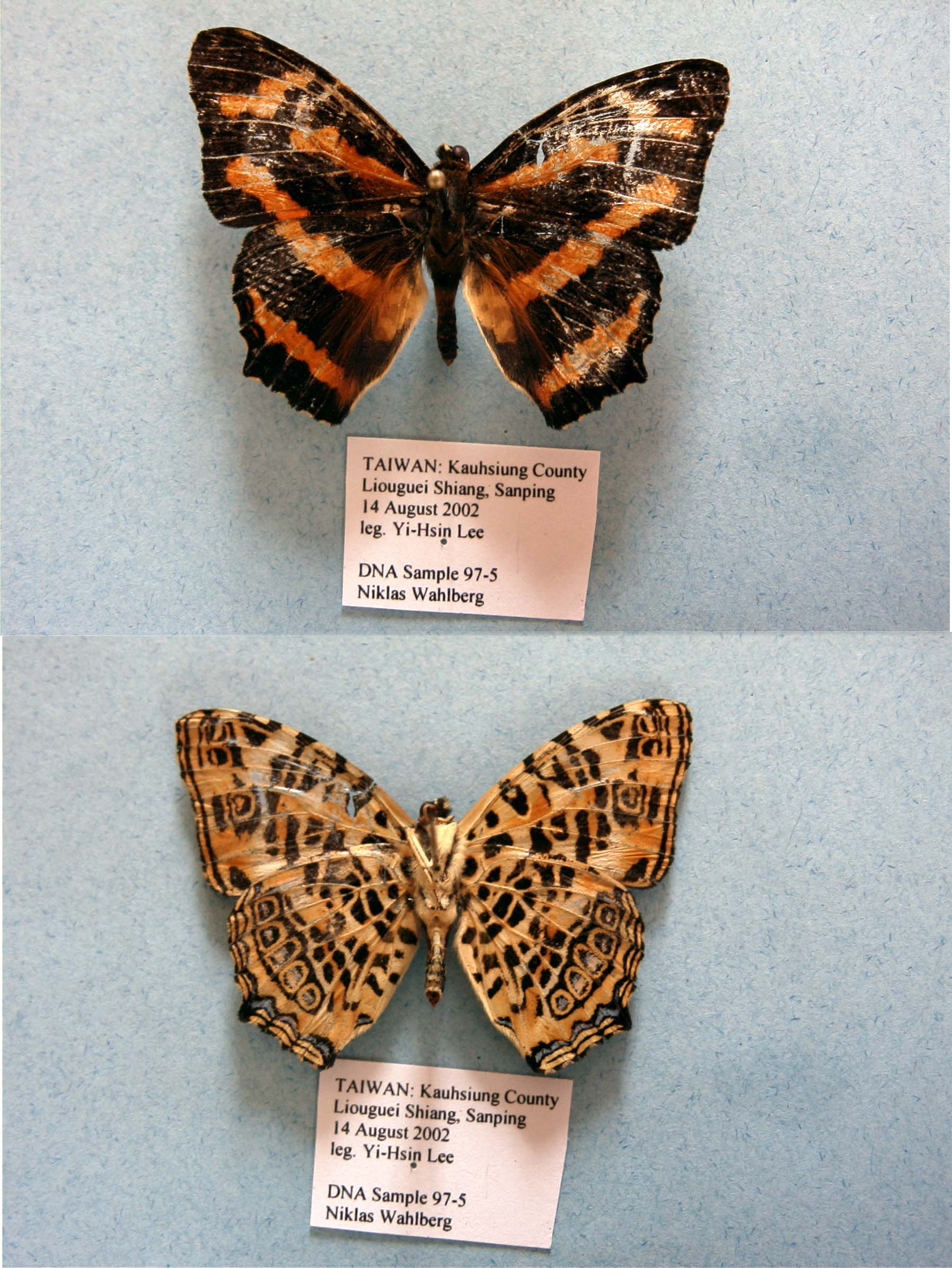
Dorsal and ventral views of Symbrenthia brabira

The wings of wet-season females have slightly paler, broader bands compared to the males, with an exception of the discoidal band which is somewhat narrower. The subapical band touches the costa, with two very small apical spots above its end. The bands on the hindwing are both narrower than in the male. The wings' undersides are identical to the male's.

The wings of dry-season males are duller fulvous-black and the bands paler than in the males' wet-season form. The bands on both wings are very broad with irregular-edges. The underside is bright ochreous-yellow with narrower and less uniform tessellated markings. The submarginal spots on the hindwings are not as conical and the centers are very sparsely metallic-speckled. The wings of dry-season females are similar to the males, but with even paler, broader markings.

Males and females both have a wingspan of 45-58 mm.

== Subspecies ==
- Symbrenthia brabira brabira
- Symbrenthia brabira leoparda Chou & Li, 1994 (South Yunnan)
- Symbrenthia brabira sinica Moore, 1899 (West China)
