= Joker 2 (disambiguation) =

Joker 2 most commonly refers to Joker: Folie à Deux, the sequel to the 2019 film Joker.

Joker 2 may also refer to:

- Joker 2.0, a version of the DC Comics character Joker
- Dragon Quest Monsters: Joker 2, a 2011 videogame
- Joker II, a 1991 videogame by Birdy Soft; see List of X68000 games and List of PC-98 games
- FC Joker II, a soccer team in Raasiku, Estonia; see List of active football clubs in Estonia

== See also ==
- Joker (disambiguation)
