= Joke (disambiguation) =

A joke is a humorous question, short story or quip.

Joke(s) or The Joke may also refer to:

- Joke (given name), also Jokes

== Music ==
- Joke (rapper), a French rapper
- "The Joke" (string quartet), nickname of Op. 33 No. 2 String Quartet by Joseph Haydn
- "The Joke" (song), a 2017 song by Brandi Carlile
- "Joke", a 2015 song by Chastity Belt from Time to Go Home
- "The Joke", a 1995 song by The Fall from Cerebral Caustic
- "The Joke", a 1991 song by Human Resource
- "The Joke", a 2007 song by Lifehouse from Who We Are

== Other media ==
- "Joke" (sketch), a comedy sketch by Rowan Atkinson and Richard Curtis
- The Joke (novel), a 1967 novel by Milan Kundera
- The Joke (film), a 1969 film based on the Kundera novel
- Jokes, an unfinished 2000 film by Harmony Korine

== See also ==
- Joker (disambiguation)
- "Jokester", a science fiction short story by Isaac Asimov
- Jokey Smurf, a prankster smurf
