= Dzhokhar =

Dzhokhar may refer to:

- Dzhokhar (name)
- Grozny, formerly (1998–2000) called Dƶoxar by the Chechen Republic of Ichkeria
