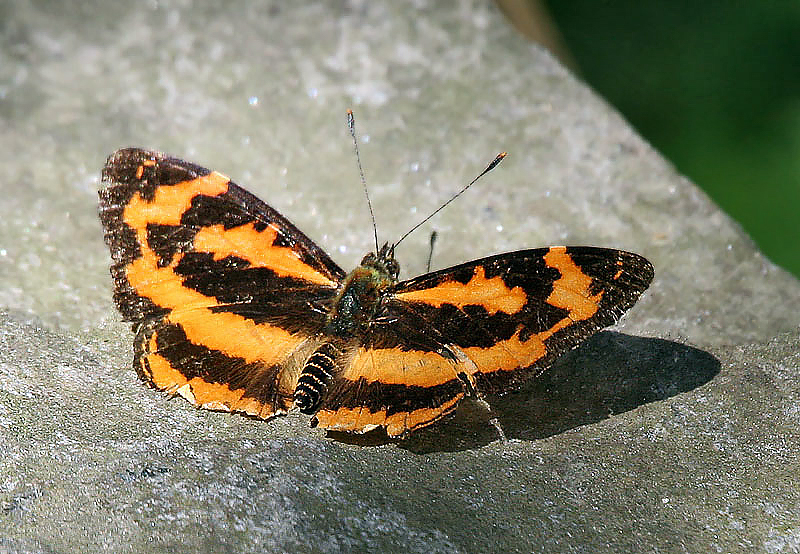

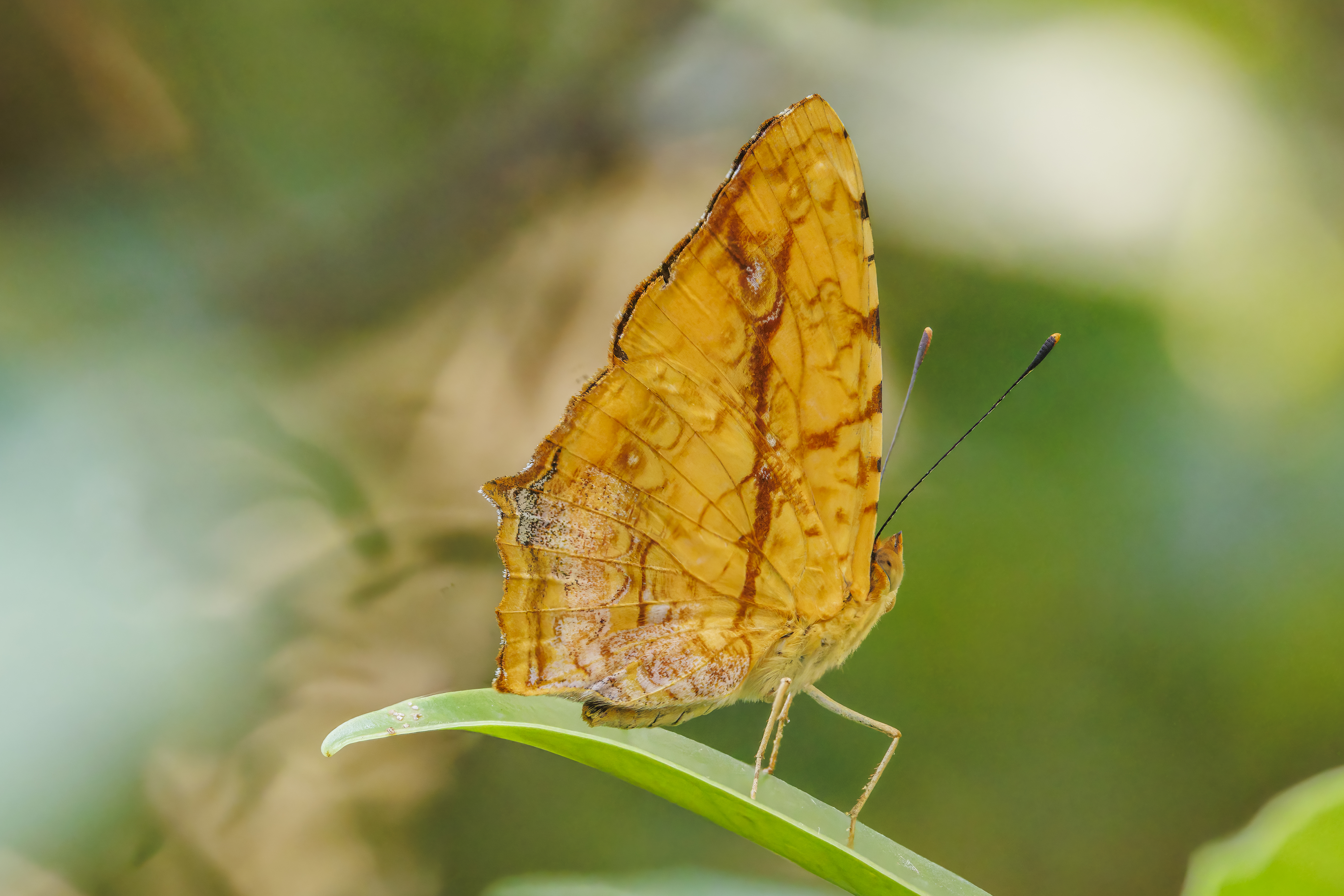

Scientific classification
- Kingdom: Animalia
- Phylum: Arthropoda
- Clade: Pancrustacea
- Class: Insecta
- Order: Lepidoptera
- Family: Nymphalidae
- Genus: Symbrenthia
- Species: S. lilaea

Binomial name
- Symbrenthia lilaea (Hewitson, 1864)

Synonyms
- Symbrenthia lilaea lucina

= Symbrenthia lilaea =

Common jester

Species of butterfly

Symbrenthia lilaea, the peninsular jester, is a species of nymphalid butterfly found in South and Southeast Asia. It forms a superspecies with S, hippoclus. Numerous regional forms are part of a poorly resolved taxonomy.

== Description ==
Wet-season form, male. The upperside is black, with orange-yellow markings.

The forewing has a clavate discoidal streak. It is bi-indentate above with a contiguous spot at the base of interspace 3. A short, outwardly oblique band runs from the middle of the dorsum, contracted in the middle; another outwardly oblique, somewhat macular, short, broad, preapical band goes from beyond the middle of costa to interspace 4, with two small spots above it in interspaces 5 and 6.

The hindwing has a broad sub-basal transverse band narrow at the costal margin and a postdiscal narrower similar band contracted into a line towards costal margin, sometimes traversed by a line of black spots and a subterminal very slender line.

The forewing underside is ochraceous orange with numerous spots and ferruginous lines. A short, outwardly oblique streak does not extend beyond interspaced. The hindwing has a sub-basal transverse streak in continual ion of the above streak on the forewing. Both wings have a series of obscure postdiscal cone-shaped marks, irrorated and rendered indistinct on the hindwing by a large patch of pink scales turning to a bluish lunule in interspace 3. The forewing is ferruginous, while the hindwing has a pale yellow subterminal line.

The antennae are black and ochraceous at apex. The head has a ferruginous pubescence; the thorax and abdomen are black on the upperside, ochraceous beneath.

The female is similar, with broader, somewhat paler orange markings on the upperside.

The dry-season form differs. The orange markings on the upperside are broader and paler in the middle, the short bands show the anterior and posterior portions of the wing coalescing. The underside is paler, the dark markings are less clearly defined than in the wet-season form.

== Distribution ==
The species livds in the Himalayas from Hazara division Pakistan to Sikkim; Assam; Burma and Tenasserim, extending to the Malayan subregion.

== Life cycle ==
=== Larva ===
The body is cylindrical. The head is black, flattened in front, vortex broad and sharply depressed in the middle. It is minutely hairy, with slightly tuberculous cheeks. The third to the last segment is armed with a dorsal and four lateral rows of black, rigid, branched spines on each side; the segments are fuliginous black, the second segment has a slender pale ochreous dorsal line, while the third to last segment hs two sublateral rows of small, pale, ochreous spots.

=== Pupa ===
The pups is pale, purpurescent, and ochreous. The thorax and abdomen are laterally protuberant in front, with a thoracic and anterior-dorsal pointed prominence. The abdominal segment has a row of dorsal and lateral small points. The head-piece projects and is widely cleft. (Moore.)

== See also ==
- List of butterflies of India (Nymphalidae)
