= Funny Boy =

Funny Boy may refer to:

- Funny Boy (novel), a 1994 novel by Shyam Selvadurai
- Funny Boy (film), a 2020 Canadian drama film adaptation of the Selvadurai novel directed by Deepa Mehta
- Funny Boy (1987 film), a French film directed by Christian Le Hémonet
