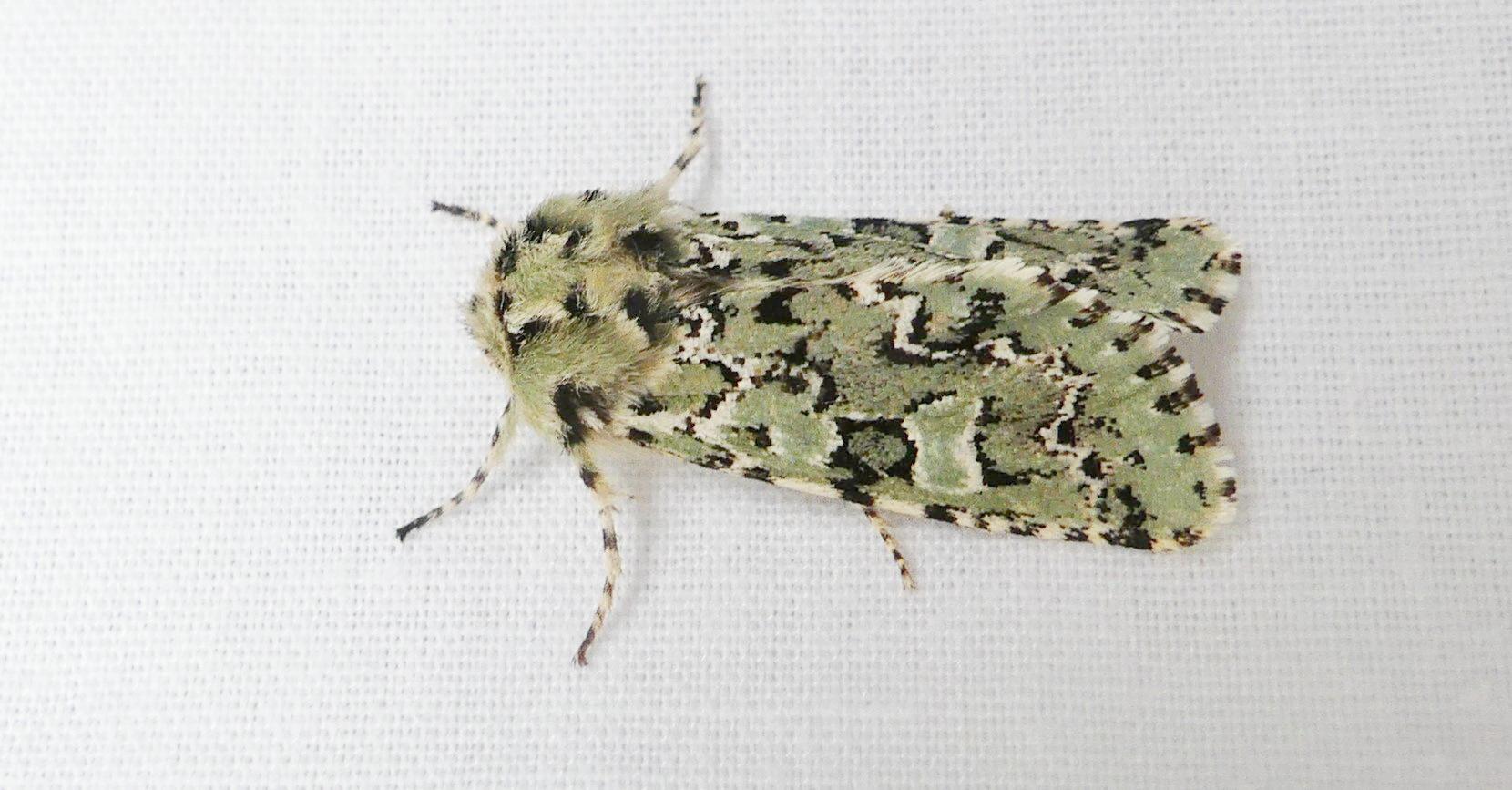

Scientific classification
- Kingdom: Animalia
- Phylum: Arthropoda
- Class: Insecta
- Order: Lepidoptera
- Superfamily: Noctuoidea
- Family: Noctuidae
- Genus: Feralia
- Species: F. jocosa

Binomial name
- Feralia jocosa Guenée, 1852

Synonyms
- Diphtera jocosa Guenée, 1852; Feralia furtiva Smith, 1909; Feralia jocosides Strand, 1916

= Feralia jocosa =

Species of moth

Feralia jocosa, the jocose sallow or the joker moth, is a moth of the family Noctuidae. The species was first described by Achille Guenée in 1852. It is found from the northeastern parts of the United States south to Maryland and Ohio, north to Newfoundland and west across the boreal forest to coastal British Columbia. In the lower mainland and Vancouver Island the species is replaced by Feralia deceptiva.

The wingspan is 30–32 mm. The moth flies from April to June depending on the location.

The larvae feed on Pinus species.

Although the larvae of Feralia jocosa primarily feed on Pinus species, historical observations indicate that they have also been associated with Tsuga canadensis (Eastern Hemlock), where they exhibit a strong preference for developing staminate aments before transitioning to newly sprouted leaves.
