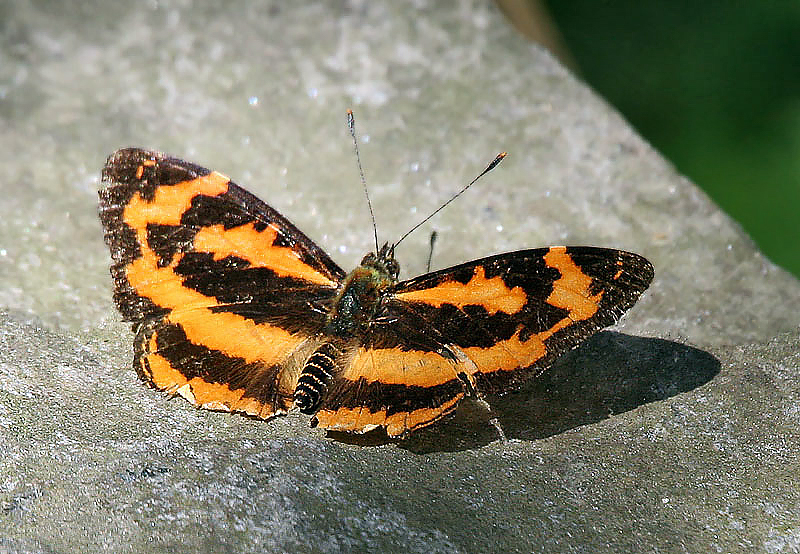
- Common jester (Symbrenthia hippoclus)

Scientific classification
- Kingdom: Animalia
- Phylum: Arthropoda
- Class: Insecta
- Order: Lepidoptera
- Family: Nymphalidae
- Tribe: Nymphalini
- Genus: Symbrenthia; Hübner, 1819

= Symbrenthia =

Genus of butterflies

Symbrenthia, commonly called jesters, is a genus of butterflies in the family Nymphalidae. They are found in south-eastern Asia

== Species ==
In alphabetical order:

- Symbrenthia anna Semper, 1888
- Symbrenthia brabira Moore, 1872
- Symbrenthia doni (Tytler, 1940) – Tytler's jester
- Symbrenthia hippalus C. & R. Felder, 1867
- Symbrenthia hippoclus (Cramer, 1779) – common jester
- Symbrenthia hypatia (Wallace, 1869)
- Symbrenthia hypselis (Godart, 1824) – Himalayan jester, spotted jester
- Symbrenthia hysudra Moore, 1874
- Symbrenthia intricata Fruhstorfer, 1897
- Symbrenthia javanus Staudinger, 1897
- Symbrenthia lilaea (Hewitson, 1864) – peninsular jester
- Symbrenthia niphanda Moore, 1872 – bluetail jester
- Symbrenthia platena Staudinger, 1897
- Symbrenthia silana de Nicéville, 1885 – scarce jester
- Symbrenthia sinoides Hall, 1935
- Symbrenthia viridilunulata Huang & Xue, 2004
