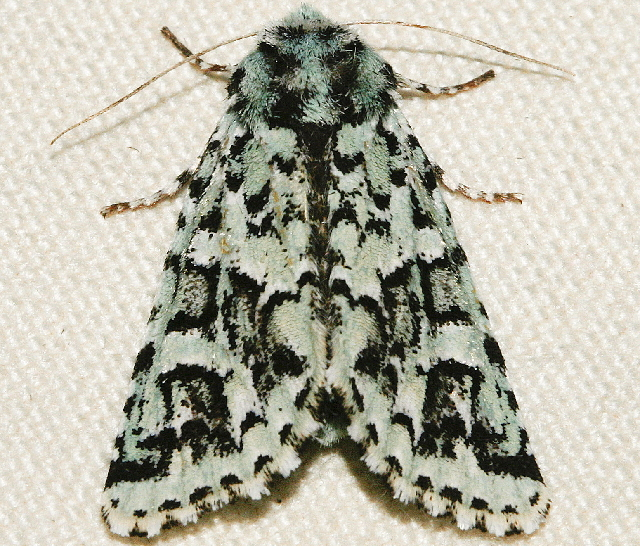
- Feralia comstocki columbiana

Scientific classification
- Kingdom: Animalia
- Phylum: Arthropoda
- Class: Insecta
- Order: Lepidoptera
- Superfamily: Noctuoidea
- Family: Noctuidae
- Genus: Feralia
- Species: F. comstocki

Binomial name
- Feralia comstocki Grote, 1874

= Feralia comstocki =

Species of moth

Feralia comstocki, or Comstock's sallow, is a moth of the family Noctuidae. The species was first described by Augustus Radcliffe Grote in 1874. It is found in North America from the southern Appalachians north to the Maritime provinces, west across the southern boreal forest to Vancouver Island, south to Oregon. In Alberta, the species has been collected from the Lake Athabasca and Zama areas south to about Pigeon Lake.

The wingspan is 33–35 mm. The moth flies from April to June depending on the location.

The larvae feed on Pinus species.

== Subspecies ==
There is one recognized subspecies, Feralia comstocki columbiana.
