= The Comedy =

The Comedy may refer to:

- Dante's Divine Comedy
- The Comedy (film), 2012 film directed by Rick Alverson
- The Comedy (album), a 1962 album by the Modern Jazz Quartet
