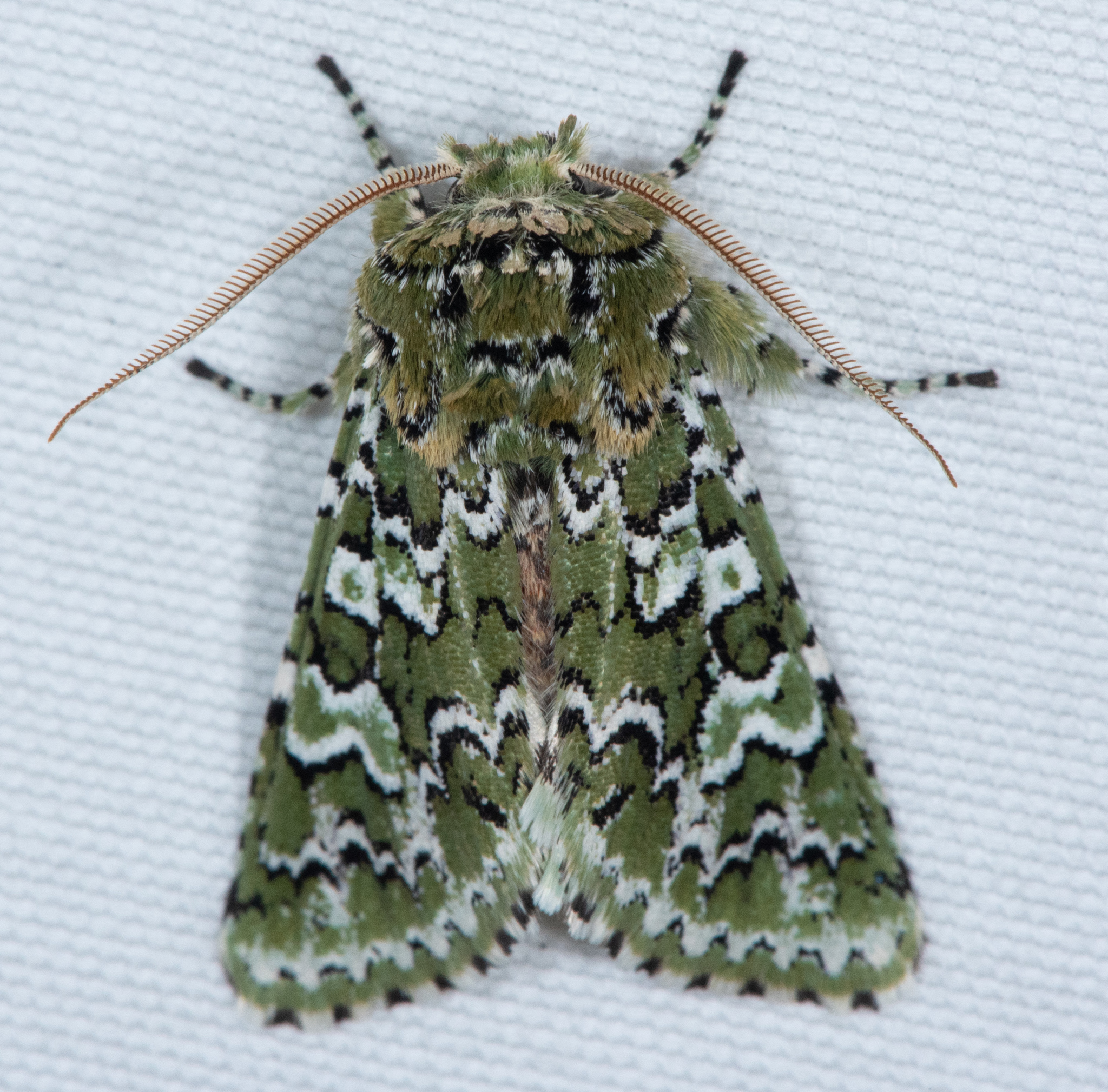

Scientific classification
- Domain: Eukaryota
- Kingdom: Animalia
- Phylum: Arthropoda
- Class: Insecta
- Order: Lepidoptera
- Superfamily: Noctuoidea
- Family: Noctuidae
- Genus: Feralia
- Species: F. februalis

Binomial name
- Feralia februalis Grote, 1874

Synonyms
- Momaphana februalis

= Feralia februalis =

Species of moth

Feralia februalis is a species of moth of the family Noctuidae. It is found in the dry woodlands of the Pacific West of North America.

The wingspan is about 34 mm. Adults are on wing from late winter to early spring.

The larvae feed on the foliage of broad-leaved trees, such as Quercus species.
