= Trickster (disambiguation) =

In mythology and folklore, a trickster is a god, goddess, spirit, human hero or anthropomorphic animal who plays pranks or otherwise disobeys normal rules and conventional behaviour.

Trickster may also refer to:

== In music ==
- Trickster (musician), eclectic Austrian musician
- Trickster (album), 1998 album by Kidneythieves
- Trickster, 2014 album by Sky-Hi
- Trickster (EP), a 2022 EP by Oneus
- "Trickster" (song), 2008 single by Japanese singer and voice actress Nana Mizuki
- "Trickster", a song by We Are Scientists from the 2002 album Safety, Fun, and Learning (In That Order)
- "The Trickster", a song by Radiohead from the EP My Iron Lung

== In video games ==
- Trickster Online, a free, 2D isometric MMORPG
- Trickster, a style used by Dante in the third and fourth installments of the Devil May Cry series
- The Trickster, also known as the Woodsie Lord, the main antagonist in Thief: The Dark Project
- The Trickster, a mob hunt in Final Fantasy XII
- Joker (Persona), the protagonist of Persona 5, is sometimes referred to as Trickster

== Other uses ==
- Trickster (Japanese TV series), 2016 Japanese anime series based on The Boy Detectives Club novels by Edogawa Ranpo
- Trickster (Canadian TV series), 2020 Canadian drama series based on the novel Son of a Trickster by Eden Robinson
- Trickster (DC Comics), two DC Comics supervillains and enemies of the Flash
- Trickster (board game) 2010 spin-off of the board game Scrabble
- The Trickster (Doctor Who), villain from the television series Sarah Jane Adventures
- The Trickster's Brigade, organization led by The Trickster, in the BBC television series Dr. Who
- The Trickster (Supernatural), an alter ego of the archangel Gabriel in the TV series Supernatural
- The Tricksters, a novel by Margaret Mahy
- Tricksters (The Flash), an episode of The Flash

== See also ==
- List of fictional tricksters
