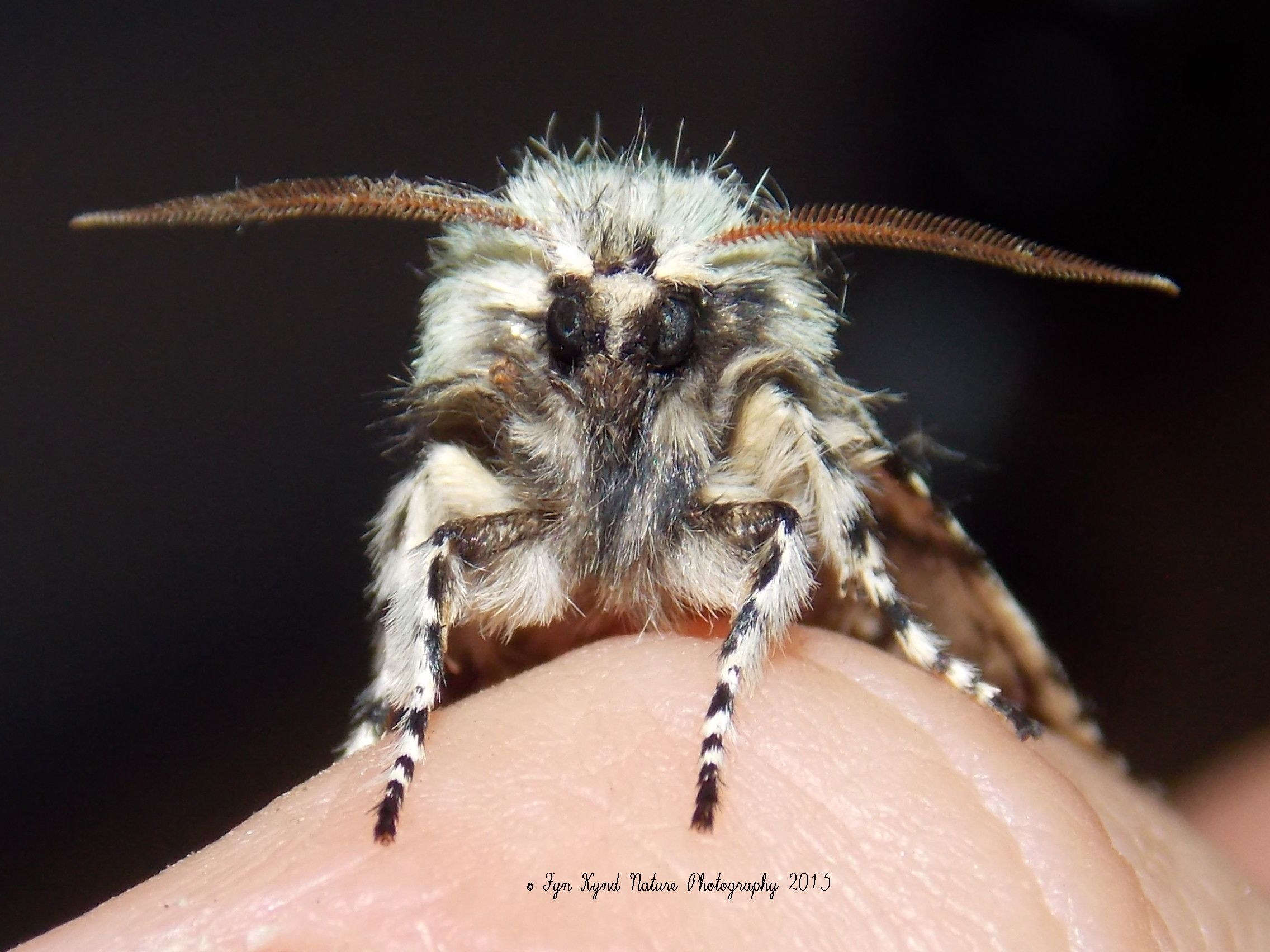
- Feralia major

Scientific classification
- Domain: Eukaryota
- Kingdom: Animalia
- Phylum: Arthropoda
- Class: Insecta
- Order: Lepidoptera
- Superfamily: Noctuoidea
- Family: Noctuidae
- Subfamily: Amphipyrinae
- Tribe: Psaphidini
- Subtribe: Feraliina
- Genus: Feralia; Grote, 1874

Synonyms
- Momophana Grote, 1875; Arthrochlora Grote, 1875

= Feralia (moth) =

Genus of moths

Feralia is a genus of moths of the family Noctuidae. The genus was erected by Augustus Radcliffe Grote in 1874.

== Species ==
- Feralia comstocki (Grote, 1874) – Comstock's sallow
- Feralia deceptiva McDunnough, 1920
- Feralia februalis Grote, 1874
- Feralia jocosa (Guenée, 1852) – jocose sallow
- Feralia major J. B. Smith, 1890 – major sallow
- Feralia meadowsi Buckett, 1967, [1968]
- Feralia sauberi (Graeser, 1892)
