= Comedians (Beavis and Butt-Head) =

- Beavis and Butt-Head episode
- Beavis and Butt-Head stand and watch the comedy club burning
- Episode no.: Season 3 Episode 1
- Directed by: Mike Judge; Mike de Sève and Brian Mulroney (Animation)
- Written by: Mike Judge
- Original air date: September 6, 1993

Episode chronology
← Previous "Be All You Can Be"	Next → "Carwash"

"Comedians" is the first episode of the third season of Beavis and Butt-Head and the 30th episode of the series overall. The episode sparked controversy after a 5-year-old boy burned down his trailer home in Ohio, killing his 2-year-old sister who was sleeping in the next room. It was suggested that the boy was inspired by the episode, in which Beavis and Butt-Head accidentally burn down a comedy club. This, however, has been disproven.

== Plot ==
Beavis and Butt-Head are sitting watching television when they see a commercial for a documentary about a stand-up comedian (Andrew Dice Clay) who lives an affluent lifestyle from his earnings. Although Beavis would rather go to Stewart's house and burn things, Butt-Head decides that they should go to the comedy club to become "stand-up chameleons".

They arrive at the club (named The Laff Hole), and Butt-Head goes on stage first, but only Beavis finds his jokes funny, and he is eventually booed off stage. Beavis is next, and the audience exits quickly, leaving only Butt-Head to watch him. Inspired by an earlier act, Beavis attempts to juggle burning newspapers but ends up burning the club down. The pair watch the fire spread from outside, all while they declare how funny and cool they both are.

== Music videos ==
- Primus - "My Name Is Mud"
- Tiffany - "I Think We're Alone Now"
- Vince Neil - "Sister of Pain"
- Belly - "Feed the Tree"

== Controversy ==
On October 6, 1993 (exactly one month after the episode had aired), Austin Messner, a 5-year-old boy from Moraine, Ohio, burned down his family's trailer with a cigarette lighter, killing his 2-year-old sister. The boy's mother claimed that he had been watching the show prior to the incident, a claim refuted by neighbors who stated the family did not have cable. Regardless, this episode in particular was blamed, due to the similarities between the plot and the incident. The following week, MTV decided to move the show to 10:30 PM instead of 7:00 PM, so that the show would be less likely to be watched by children at that time, and also decided to delete and omit fire references in future episodes and added a disclaimer. They extensively edited the episode before pulling it from broadcasting and locking it away in the MTV vault.

In 2008, Messner himself would confirm that his family did not have cable at the time since it was unaffordable due to his mother's drug addiction, and that he had never seen an episode of the show, nor planned to.
