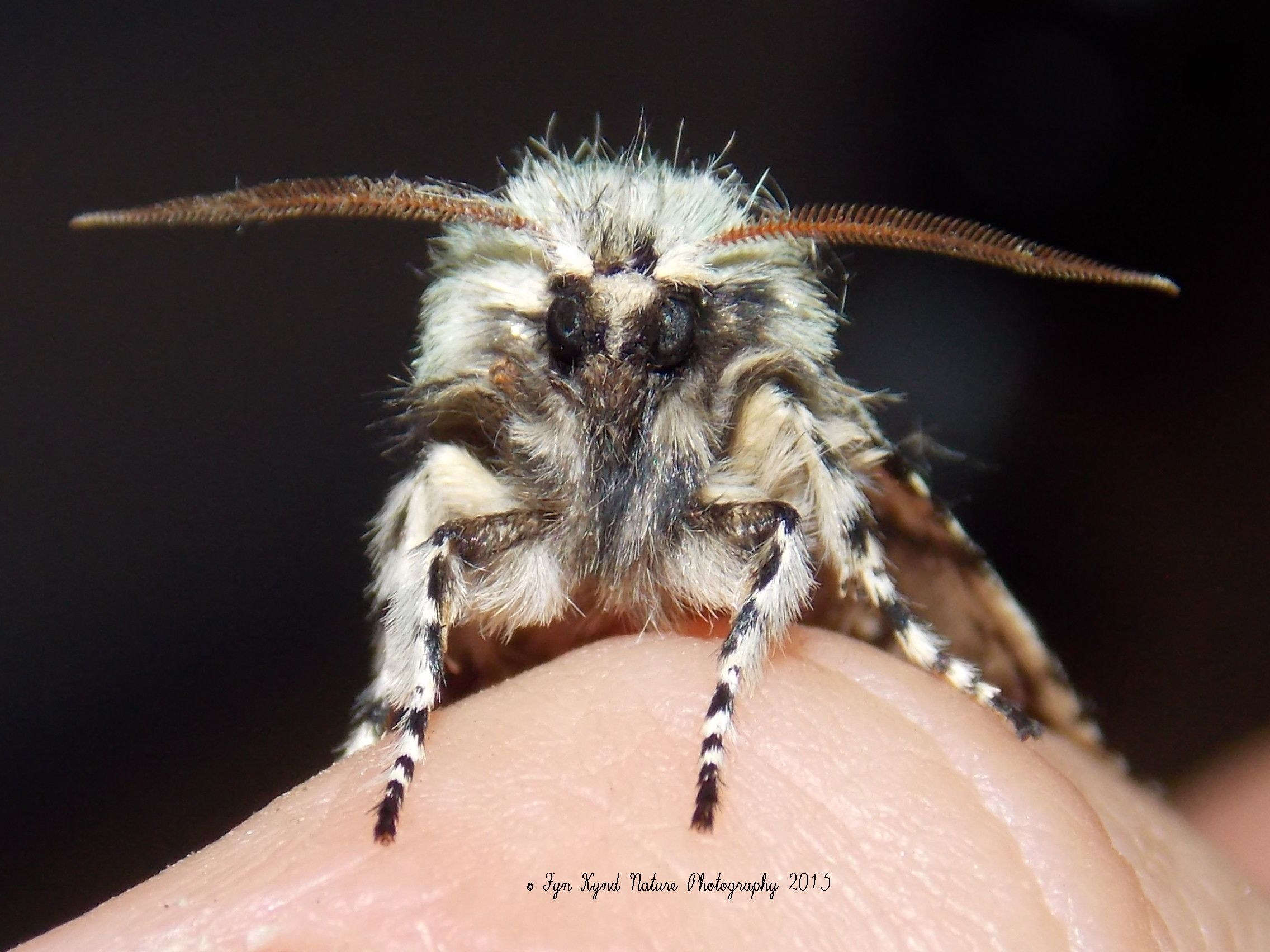

Scientific classification
- Kingdom: Animalia
- Phylum: Arthropoda
- Clade: Pancrustacea
- Class: Insecta
- Order: Lepidoptera
- Superfamily: Noctuoidea
- Family: Noctuidae
- Genus: Feralia
- Species: F. major

Binomial name
- Feralia major J. B. Smith, 1890

= Feralia major =

Species of moth

Feralia major, the major sallow, is a moth of the family Noctuidae. The species was first described by John Bernhardt Smith in 1890. It is found from the northeastern parts of the United States west across the southern boreal forest to western Alberta. The exact southern range is uncertain, as populations from the southeastern US south to Texas are brighter blue green and appear to be a separate species.

The wingspan is about 40 mm. The moth flies in April depending on the location.

The larvae feed on Pinus species.
