= Jester (surname) =

Jester is a surname.

== People ==
- Beauford H. Jester (1893–1949), Governor of Texas from 1947 to 1949
- Cole Jester (born 1997). American politician
- George Taylor Jester (1847–1922), Lieutenant Governor of Texas from 1895 to 1899, father of Beauford
- Maurice D. Jester (1889–1957), United States Coast Guard officer
- Ralph Jester (1901–1991), American costume designer
- T.C. Jester (1884–1950), American pastor and civic leader
- Virgil Jester (1927–2016), American Major League Baseball pitcher
