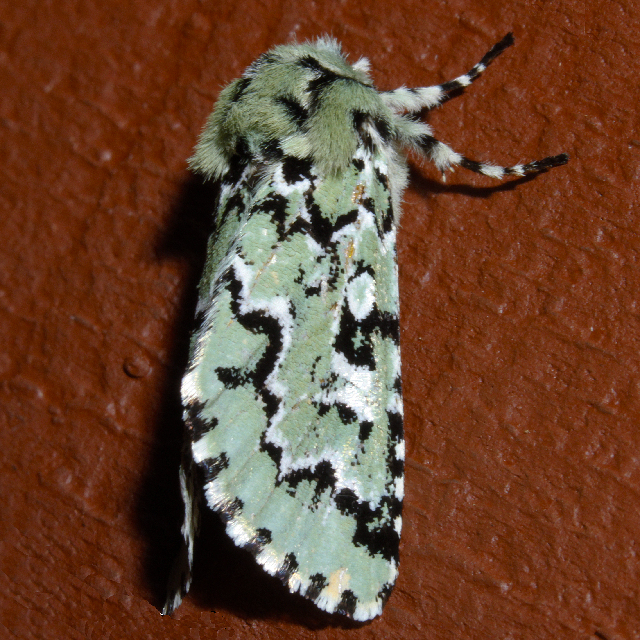

Scientific classification
- Domain: Eukaryota
- Kingdom: Animalia
- Phylum: Arthropoda
- Class: Insecta
- Order: Lepidoptera
- Superfamily: Noctuoidea
- Family: Noctuidae
- Tribe: Psaphidini
- Subtribe: Feraliina
- Genus: Feralia
- Species: F. deceptiva

Binomial name
- Feralia deceptiva McDunnough, 1920

= Feralia deceptiva =

Species of moth

Feralia deceptiva, the deceptive sallow, is a species of mossy sallow in the moth family Noctuidae. It is found in North America.

The MONA or Hodges number for Feralia deceptiva is 10006.
