= Expeditions: A MudRunner Game =

- Developer: Saber Interactive
- Publisher: Focus Entertainment
- Director: Oliver Hollis-Leick
- Platforms: Microsoft Windows; Nintendo Switch; PlayStation 4; PlayStation 5; Xbox One; Xbox Series X/S
- Release: March 5, 2024
- Genre: Vehicle simulation
- Modes: Single-player, multiplayer

Expeditions: A MudRunner Game is a vehicle simulation game developed by Saber Interactive and published by Focus Entertainment. A spin-off game in the MudRunner series, it was released for Microsoft Windows, Nintendo Switch, PlayStation 4, PlayStation 5, Xbox One and Xbox Series X and Series S on March 5, 2024.

== Gameplay ==
Similar to previous games in the series, the player must drive a variety of all-terrain vehicles through treacherous roads in the wilderness. However, unlike its predecessors, the game focuses on exploring instead of transporting cargo. In the game, players lead scientific expeditions to three distinct environments set in Little Colorado, Arizona, and Carpathian Mountains in Central Europe. Each map in the game is a large, open environment filled with optional objectives, though freeroam mode is not unlocked until players complete each map's expedition mission. Expeditions introduces a number of new tools, including jackscrews which flip over players' cars, metal detectors and camera drones which allow players to scout the environment and find valuable caches, and sonar detector which helps detect the depth of water. Players can also attach a winch to a tree or any rock surface, enabling the vehicle to scale steep cliffs. As players progress in the game, they need to expand their base camp's research structure and trade sites, unlocking new tools and recruiting new non-playable characters to aid their missions.

== Development ==
Saber Interactive, the developer of MudRunner and SnowRunner, returned to develop Expeditions. Creative director Oliver Hollis-Leick added that when compared with SnowRunner, Expeditions had a "more adventurous spirit", as players are tasked to use technology to identify and reach their objectives. Expeditions: A MudRunner Game was announced by publisher Focus Entertainment in August 2023. The game was released for Microsoft Windows, Nintendo Switch, PlayStation 4, PlayStation 5, Xbox One and Xbox Series X and Series S on March 5, 2024. Cooperative multiplayer mode is set to be added to the game through a free post-launch update.

== Reception ==
Reception

Aggregate scores
Aggregator	Score
Metacritic	(PC) 78/100 (PS5) 79/100 (XSX) 81/100
OpenCritic	79% recommend

Review scores
Publication	Score
IGN	8/10
Shacknews	7/10

The game received "generally favourable" reviews upon release according to review aggregator Metacritic. Fellow review aggregator OpenCritic assessed that the game received strong approval, being recommended by 79% of critics.

Luke Reilly from IGN described it as a "worthwhile complementary experience" to SnowRunner. He concluded his review by writing that Expedition's "unique brand of slow-paced bushwhacking won't ever be for everybody, but successfully taking a truck on a trek through terrain that the toughest trailblazers would fear to tread is still an oddly satisfying challenge that proves the journey is always more important than the destination". Jan Ole Peek from Shacknews described the game as an "interesting iteration" for the franchise. While he thought the game was enjoyable, he was disappointed by the game's new additions, feeling that they were underdeveloped. Rick Lane from Rock, Paper, Shotgun wrote that the game "nonetheless succeeds in its primary objective, to build a world where the car and the ground are at irrepressible odds", though he criticized the game's user interface, underwhelming objectives and the lack of a central story. Ultimately, he concluded that "doing fake science is quite dull without any characters or stakes to pin it to".
