= SnowRunner =

2020 video game

- Cover art featuring the Freightliner M916A1 and the Hummer H2
- Developer: Saber Interactive
- Publisher: Focus Home Interactive
- Series: MudRunner
- Platforms: Microsoft Windows macOS (ended with S16); PlayStation 4 Xbox One; Nintendo Switch (ended with S16); PlayStation 5 Xbox Series X/S; Nintendo Switch 2
- Release: Windows, PlayStation 4, Xbox One; April 28, 2020; Nintendo Switch; May 18, 2021; PlayStation 5, Xbox Series X/S; May 31, 2022; Nintendo Switch 2 June 9, 2026
- Genre: Vehicle simulation
- Modes: Single-player; Multiplayer

SnowRunner is a 2020 simulation video game developed by Saber Interactive and published by Focus Home Interactive. Following on from Spintires and the sequel MudRunner, the game was announced as MudRunner 2 in August 2018. Focus Home and Saber Interactive re-revealed the title a year later as SnowRunner. The game was first released for Microsoft Windows, PlayStation 4, and Xbox One on April 28, 2020, which was then followed by a port for Nintendo Switch on May 18, 2021, then for PlayStation 5 and Xbox Series X/S on May 31, 2022, and then by a port for Nintendo Switch 2 on June 9, 2026. SnowRunner has the player control off-road vehicles as they traverse locations to complete objectives. The game features over 60 different vehicles and more than 15 locations. Much of the content is delivered across 5 anniversary year editions as DLC. A spin-off title, Expeditions: A MudRunner Game was released on March 5, 2024.

== Gameplay ==
SnowRunner is an off-roading open world simulation video game where the player's job is to deliver cargo, completing construction projects and/or repairs at different locations while driving over rough terrain. The game has a damage system in which there is both damage on the physical model and damage shown through the user interface (UI). Each of the game regions is set after a disaster has taken place, whether natural like a flood or manmade, such as a pipeline breaking. Every location is in a rural region in either North America, Russia, Europe or Central Asia. As the player progresses by doing certain missions, they earn money which can be spent on either upgrades for their current vehicles or better vehicles altogether. Both of these usually make it easier for the player to traverse the game's terrain. Along the way the player encounters optional timed missions called "contest" in which the rewards for completion get better the faster the player completes them. Each region has its own story associated with it, usually involving the player fixing the damage caused by the disaster that occurred in the region.

The game features a mix of aesthetic and mechanical customizations, ranging from changing the color of the player's vehicle, to changing the type of tires on the vehicle or installing a frame attachment. SnowRunner has a large selection of trucks, such as the Chevrolet Kodiak and the BAZ-69092; trucks found in the North American or Russian regions usually match their location. The Russian trucks usually have names differing from real life, while the North American trucks are mostly officially licensed. Mechanical improvements to trucks usually require the player to reach a certain progress threshold before being able to purchase and install them. Downloadable content (DLC) available for the game includes skin packs, map expansions, and additional vehicles.

== Development ==
SnowRunner is based on the same physics engine developed by Pavel Zagrebelnyy, as MudRunner. During development of SnowRunner, Zagrebelnyy was mainly involved as a consultant, rather than deciding on the gameplay. It uses the Swarm video game engine.

== Reception ==
Reception

Aggregate score
Aggregator	Score
Metacritic	PC: 82/100; PS4: 81/100; XONE: 81/100; NS: 75/100

Review scores
Publication	Score
IGN	8/10
Jeuxvideo.com	16/20
Nintendo Life	7/10
PC Gamer (US)	83/100

The game received "generally positive" reviews according to media review aggregator website Metacritic across its three platform releases. Some critics praised the visuals and pacing of the game. The game sold more than one million copies by July 2020. More than two million copies had been sold by May 2021.

In November 2024, Tim Willits, Chief Creative Officer of Saber Interactive, told the Game Maker’s Notebook that over 15 million people have played SnowRunner across all platforms since release.
