= Comic (disambiguation) =

Comic or Comics may refer to:

== Arts and entertainment ==
- Comic, another term for a comedian
  - The Comic, a 1969 comedy film directed by Carl Reiner
  - Comics!, a 1990s Canadian television series
  - Comics (British TV series), a 1993 miniseries
- Comics or comic, a storytelling medium using sequential images and words, such as:
  - Comic book
  - Comic strip
  - Comics, an app for reading comics from ComiXology
- "Comics", a track on the Caravan Palace album <|°_°|>
- "The Comic" (King Rollo), a 1980 television episode

== Aviation ==
- Comic, a nickname of the night fighter version of the Sopwith Camel, a World War 1 aircraft
- Comic, a nickname of a variant of the Sopwith 1½ Strutter, a World War 1 aircraft

== Typography ==
- Comic Sans a typeface released by Microsoft in the 1990s

== See also ==
- Comedian (disambiguation)
- Comedy (disambiguation)
- Komic
- Comix
- The Comiq
