= Jester (disambiguation) =

A jester is a type of entertainer employed by the nobility during the Middle Ages and the Renaissance.

Jester may also refer to:

== Arts, entertainment and media ==
=== Characters ===
- Jester (Marvel Comics), a supervillain
- Jester (Quality Comics), a superhero
- Jester (Puppet Master)
- Jester, a character in the Oz book series by L. Frank Baum
- Jester Lavorre, a tiefling cleric player character in web series Critical Role
- Jester, a Devil May Cry 3: Dante's Awakening character
- Jester, a Gauntlet Dark Legacy character class

=== Films ===
- The Jester (1937 film), a Polish musical comedy
- The Jester (1988 film), a Soviet drama film
- The Jester (2023 film), an American horror film
  - The Jester 2
- O Bobo, a 1987 Portuguese film with the English-language title The Jester

=== Music ===
- Jester Records, a record label
- The Jesters (R&B band), a group from Athens, GA
- The Jesters, an American doo-wop group
- Jesters III, a band from Gaffney, South Carolina
- "The Jester", a song by Sum 41 on the album Underclass Hero
- Jester, a 2017 album by Savant
- Jim Messina and His Jesters, a California-based surf band (See Jim Messina (musician))

=== In print ===
- The Jester (novel), by James Patterson
- Jester of Columbia or Jester, a humor magazine
- Simon Jester, in Robert Heinlein's novel The Moon is a Harsh Mistress an alias of the sentient computer Mike
- The Jester, 1951 humorous science fiction short story by William Tenn

=== Television series ===
- The Jesters (TV series), an Australian comedy series which aired in 2009 and 2011

== People ==
- Jester (surname), several people and a fictional character
- Jester Hairston (1901–2000), American composer and actor
- Jester Naefe (1924–1967), Austrian actress
- Jester Weah (born 1995), American football player
- The Jester (hacktivist), computer vigilante

== Other uses ==
- Newcastle Jesters, an English ice hockey team
- Royal Order of Jesters, a fraternal organization
- The Jester (roller coaster), at Six Flags New Orleans
- Jester (sailboat)
- Jester Center, a University of Texas at Austin residence hall
- Jester Rock, Antarctica
- Jesters, butterflies of the genus Symbrenthia
  - Common jester, Symbrenthia lilaea
