= MudRunner =

2017 video game

- Developer: Saber Interactive
- Publisher: Focus Home Interactive
- Engine: Havok
- Platforms: Windows; PlayStation 4; Xbox One; Nintendo Switch; Android; iOS
- Release: Windows, PS4, Xbox One; October 31, 2017; Nintendo Switch; November 27, 2018; Android, iOS; July 15, 2020
- Genre: Vehicle simulation
- Modes: Single-player, online co-op

MudRunner (formerly Spintires: MudRunner) is a 2017 off-roading simulation game developed by Saber Interactive and published by Focus Home Interactive. It was released on October 31, 2017 for Microsoft Windows, PlayStation 4, and Xbox One and is a spin-off/sequel of the 2014 Windows-exclusive Spintires, which was developed by Oovee Game Studios. Similar to Spintires, MudRunner has the player control off-road vehicles as they traverse locations to complete objectives. The game was released in Japan on Nintendo Switch on June 18, 2020. A sequel to MudRunner was released on April 28, 2020 titled SnowRunner.

== Gameplay ==
MudRunner is an all-terrain simulation video game which tasks driving through muddy unpaved roads in aging Soviet vehicles with nothing but a map and a compass. The aim of the game is to transport logs to their destination without depleting resources (such as fuel) or damaging the vehicle. There is both a single-player and multiplayer co-op mode that both use the same main six maps (base game), with an addition of 3 American maps and 2 Russian maps along with DLC content. Over the game's time, there have been 4 batches of DLC content added introducing new vehicles (some licensed), new gameplay maps and challenge maps. The main game maps often included various off-roading elements such as water bodies and rivers, paved roads, trails and changes in elevation (particularly evident in maps such as "Island" and "Downhill") which enable the player to experience a larger and more accurate simulation of the genre. The map setup is very similar to the previous installment "Spintires" in the series as maps contain similar amounts of these elements and naming (e.g. "Flood" in Spintires and "Deluge" in Mudrunner).

The game includes various real life aspects of off-roading simulation including additional fuel usage when engaging features such as all-wheel-drive and a differential lock. The game also incorporates a dynamic environment with a day to night game cycle as well as terrain deformation physics (when driving over particular areas multiple times the terrain will become softer and thus provide less grip). When selecting a map in single-player mode, a choice can be made between "hardcore" and "casual" difficulty levels which include different parameters for the game, being increased fuel consumption for hardcore compared to casual, a reduced ability of navigation with checkpoint markers becoming more vague, the inability to enable differential lock when driving in automatic gearbox (the game includes an H-Pattern shifter for all vehicles) and the main adjustment being the necessity of using a crane to manually load up logs and pack them into your vehicle as opposed to automatic loading in casual mode.

Various add ons can be equipped to allow tasks to be complete such as fuel tankers and log trailers of each different sizes. The game's object is to deliver a total of 8 load points to either 1 or 2 lumber mills in a single map, with different log sizes providing varied amounts of load points (commonly short logs; 3 points, medium logs; 4 points and long logs; 6 points (there can be exceptions to this system)). All vehicles in the game are organised in different classes which represent their utility and offroad capabilities, with each vehicle yielding a different number of "balance points". These balance points add up to a sum for each map, and when completing the map the number of points used to achieve this is stated, with the lowest number of points used being the objective for total completion.

The game has a challenge mode that presents nine small maps each based around a specific gameplay function meant to teach the player the different aspects of the game which was later increased to 11 total challenge maps after the addition of the American Wilds DLC. Each level also has three bonus objectives which can be completed to earn achievements; they offer no in-game rewards.

== Post-release content ==
The game has an expansion, American Wilds, which features American automobiles instead of Soviet. It also bundled with the base game and release on console as an ultimate edition of the game. This DLC included 9 new vehicles (7 licensed trucks) and 2 separate new maps that generally contain a larger amount of paved roads when compared to the base game to simulate American regions. This DLC demonstrated a new “scavenge” log mechanism in which the player must explore an area with random types of logs spawning and manually load them into the vehicle. The add ons and trailers for the American vehicles were refined to better suit the location of the DLC. Adjustments to the game’s graphics were also present with an increased saturation and warmer tone when compared to the somewhat dull and foggy conditions in base game. Other DLC contents such as “Old Timers”, “The Valley” and “The Ridge” were also added with new vehicles and gameplay mechanisms.

== Reception ==
Reception

Aggregate score
Aggregator	Score
Metacritic	PC: 77/100; PS4: 67/100; XONE: 72/100

Review scores
Publication	Score
Nintendo Life	7/10
PCGamesN	6/10
Push Square	7/10
Shacknews	9/10

On review aggregation site Metacritic, MudRunner has aggregate scores of 67 and 72 for the PlayStation 4 and Xbox One versions of the game respectively, indicating "mixed or average reviews", and a score of 77 for the PC version, indicating "generally favorable reviews". Nintendo Life gave the Nintendo Switch version of the game a 7/10, praising the quality port to the Switch and the lush environments of the American Wilds DLC included with the game, while criticizing "frustrating design faults" from the previous version, such as the lack of an automatic navigation system.
