= List of PlayStation 3 games (J–P) =

There are currently 2304 games in this table across all pages: A to C, D to I, J to P, and Q to Z. It does not include PlayStation minis, PS one Classics or PS2 Classics.

Key
3D Stereoscopic 3-D	M PlayStation Move optional M required	SV SimulView	F2P Free-to-play	E PlayStation Eye	D Digital only games

Title	Developer(s)	Release date			Options	Ref.
Title	Developer(s)	JP	PAL	NA	Options	Ref.
J-Stars Victory Vs	Spike Chunsoft	March 19, 2014	June 26, 2015	June 30, 2015		
J-Stars Victory Vs+ (Note: update for J-Stars Victory Vs.)	Spike Chunsoft	Unreleased	June 30, 2015	June 30, 2015		
Jak 3 HD	Naughty Dog	February 22, 2012	February 22, 2012	February 22, 2012	D 3D	
Jak and Daxter: The Precursor Legacy HD	Naughty Dog	February 22, 2012	February 22, 2012	February 22, 2012	D 3D	
Jak II HD	Naughty Dog	February 22, 2012	February 22, 2012	February 22, 2012	D 3D	
JAM Live Music Arcade	Zivix	Unreleased	Unreleased	May 15, 2012	D	
James Bond 007: Blood Stone	Bizarre Creations	Unreleased	November 5, 2010	November 2, 2010		
Jane's Advanced Strike Fighters	Trickstar Games	Unreleased	November 15, 2011	October 18, 2011		
Janline R	Recom	August 6, 2009	Unreleased	Unreleased		
Jeopardy!	Sony Online Entertainment	Unreleased	Unreleased	September 11, 2008	D	
Jeopardy! (2012)	Pipeworks Software	Unreleased	Unreleased	October 16, 2012		
Jeremy McGrath's Offroad	2XL Games	Unreleased	March 13, 2013	June 26, 2012	D	
Jet Car Stunts	Grip Digital	Unreleased	October 8, 2014	October 7, 2014	D	
Jet Set Radio	Smilebit	February 20, 2013	September 19, 2012	September 18, 2012	D	
Jetpack Joyride	Halfbrick Studios	Unreleased	December 21, 2012	December 31, 2012	D	
Jetpack Joyride Deluxe (Note: update for Jetpack Joyride.)	Halfbrick Studios	Unreleased	November 25, 2014	November 25, 2014	D	
Jikkyou Powerful Pro Yakyuu 2010	Konami	July 15, 2010	Unreleased	Unreleased		
Jikkyou Powerful Pro Yakyuu 2011	Konami	July 14, 2011	Unreleased	Unreleased		
Jikkyou Powerful Pro Yakyuu 2012	Konami	July 19, 2012	Unreleased	Unreleased		
Jikkyou Powerful Pro Yakyuu 2013	Konami	October 24, 2013	Unreleased	Unreleased		
Jikkyou Powerful Pro Yakyuu 2014	Konami	October 23, 2014	Unreleased	Unreleased		
Jikkyou Powerful Pro Yakyuu 2016	Konami	April 28, 2016	Unreleased	Unreleased		
Jikkyou Powerful Pro Yakyuu Championship 2017	Konami	May 25, 2017	Unreleased	Unreleased	D	
Jikkyou Powerful Pro Yakyuu: Success Special	Konami	April 28, 2016	Unreleased	Unreleased	D	
Jimmie Johnson's Anything with an Engine	Isopod Labs	Unreleased	Unreleased	November 1, 2011		
Jissen Pachi-Slot Hisshouhou! Hokuto no Ken F - Seikimatsu Kyuuseishu Densetsu	Sega	May 31, 2012	Unreleased	Unreleased		
Joe Danger	Hello Games	January 26, 2012	June 9, 2010	June 8, 2010	D	
Joe Danger 2: The Movie	Hello Games	Unreleased	October 10, 2012	October 9, 2012	D	
John Daly's ProStroke Golf	Gusto Games	Unreleased	October 15, 2010	October 5, 2010	M	
John Woo Presents: Stranglehold	Midway Chicago	Unreleased	November 30, 2007	October 29, 2007		
JoJo's Bizarre Adventure HD Ver.	Capcom	August 21, 2012	August 22, 2012	August 21, 2012	D	
JoJo's Bizarre Adventure: All Star Battle	CyberConnect2	October 29, 2013	April 25, 2014	April 29, 2014		
JoJo's Bizarre Adventure: Eyes of Heaven	CyberConnect2	December 17, 2015	Unreleased	Unreleased		
Journey Collector's Edition	Thatgamecompany	October 28, 2012	October 28, 2012	October 28, 2012		
Joust	Sony Online Entertainment	Unreleased	June 15, 2007	May 24, 2007	D	
Joysound Dive (app)	Xing Inc.	November 24, 2011	Unreleased	Unreleased	D	
JOYSOUND.TV Plus (app)	XING	December 11, 2014	Unreleased	Unreleased	D	
Juiced 2: Hot Import Nights	Juice Games / Paradigm Entertainment	January 24, 2008	October 26, 2007	October 22, 2007		
Judge Dee: The City God Case	BigBen Interactive	Unreleased	July 11, 2012	December 11, 2012	D	
Juju	Flying Wild Hog	Unreleased	December 10, 2014	December 9, 2014	D	
Jurassic Park: The Game	Telltale Games	November 15, 2011	November 15, 2011	November 15, 2011	D	
Jurassic: The Hunted	Cauldron HQ	Unreleased	Unreleased	November 3, 2009		
Just Cause 2	Avalanche Studios	Unreleased	March 26, 2010	March 23, 2010		
Just Dance 3	Ubisoft Reflections	Unreleased	December 9, 2011	December 6, 2011	M	
Just Dance 4	Ubisoft Paris	Unreleased	October 2, 2012	October 9, 2012	M	
Just Dance 2014	Ubisoft Paris	Unreleased	October 1, 2013	October 8, 2013	M	
Just Dance 2015	Ubisoft Paris	Unreleased	October 23, 2014	October 21, 2014	M	
Just Dance 2016	Ubisoft Paris	Unreleased	October 22, 2015	October 20, 2015	M	
Just Dance 2017	Ubisoft Paris	Unreleased	October 27, 2016	October 25, 2016	M	
Just Dance 2018	Ubisoft Paris	Unreleased	October 27, 2017	October 24, 2017	M	
Just Dance Kids 2 •Just Dance Kids^{EU/AUS}	Land Ho!	Unreleased	November 4, 2011	October 25, 2011	M	
K-ON! Ho-kago Live!!	Sega	June 21, 2012	Unreleased	Unreleased		
Kaihou Shoujo SIN	Sega	December 5, 2013	Unreleased	Unreleased		
Kamen Rider Battride War	Bandai Namco Games	March 23, 2013	Unreleased	Unreleased		
Kamen Rider Battride War Sousei	Bandai Namco Games	February 25, 2016	Unreleased	Unreleased		
Kamen Rider Battride War 2	Bandai Namco Games	June 24, 2014	Unreleased	Unreleased		
Kamen Rider: SummonRide	Bandai Namco Games	December 4, 2014	Unreleased	Unreleased		
Kane & Lynch: Dead Men	IO Interactive	July 10, 2008	November 23, 2007	November 13, 2007		
Kane & Lynch 2: Dog Days	IO Interactive	Unreleased	August 20, 2010	August 17, 2010		
Karaoke Revolution	Blitz Games	Unreleased	February 12, 2010	November 24, 2009		
Karaoke Revolution Presents: American Idol Encore	Blitz Games	Unreleased	Unreleased	March 4, 2008		
Karaoke Revolution Presents: American Idol Encore 2	Blitz Games	Unreleased	Unreleased	November 18, 2008		
Katamari Forever	Namco Bandai	July 23, 2009	September 18, 2009	September 22, 2009		
Katsuragi Misato Houdou Keikaku (app)	Bandai Namco Games	June 6, 2009	Unreleased	Unreleased	D	
Karateka	Liquid Entertainment	Unreleased	February 13, 2013	December 18, 2012	D	
Kazoku Keikaku Tumugu Ito	Cyber Front	October 24, 2013	Unreleased	Unreleased		
Ken to Mahou to Gakuen Mono. 3 (Class of Heroes 3)	Acquire	October 7, 2010	Unreleased	Unreleased		
Ketsui: Kizuna Jigoku Tachi Extra	5pb.	July 25, 2013	Unreleased	Unreleased		
Kevin Van Dam's Big Bass Challenge	Zoo Games	Unreleased	Unreleased	June 30, 2011		
Kick-Ass: The Game	Frozen Codebase	Unreleased	May 5, 2010	April 29, 2010		
Kick-Ass 2: The Game	Grasshopper Manufacture	Unreleased	August 1, 2014	Unreleased		
KickBeat	Zen Studios	Unreleased	September 11, 2013	September 3, 2013	D	
Killer is Dead	Grasshopper Manufacture	August 1, 2013	August 27, 2013	August 27, 2013		
Killzone 2	Guerrilla Games	Unreleased	February 25, 2009	February 27, 2009		
Killzone 3	Guerrilla Games	February 24, 2011	February 25, 2011	February 22, 2011	3D SV M	
Killzone HD	Supermassive Games	Unreleased	Unreleased	October 23, 2012		
King's Quest	The Odd Gentlemen	Unreleased	July 29, 2015	July 28, 2015	D	
King Oddball	10tons	Unreleased	Unreleased	February 3, 2015	D	
The King of Fighters XII	SNK Playmore	July 28, 2009	July 28, 2009	July 28, 2009		
The King of Fighters XIII	SNK Playmore	December 1, 2011	November 25, 2011	November 22, 2011		
Kingdom Hearts HD 1.5 Remix	Square Enix	March 14, 2013	September 13, 2013	September 10, 2013		
Kingdom Hearts HD 2.5 Remix	Square Enix	October 2, 2014	December 5, 2014	December 5, 2014		
Kingdoms of Amalur: Reckoning	38 Studios, Big Huge Games	Unreleased	February 9, 2012	February 7, 2012		
Kite Fight	Gameshastra	Unreleased	May 29, 2013	Unreleased	D	
Knights Contract	Namco Bandai	July 7, 2011	February 25, 2011	February 22, 2011		
Knytt Underground	nifflas	Unreleased	December 21, 2012	December 18, 2012	D	
Koihime Embu	BaseSon	January 28, 2016	Unreleased	Unreleased		
Kono Oozora Ni Tsubasa Wo Hirogete Cruise Sign	5pb.	March 31, 2016	Unreleased	Unreleased		
Krinkle Krusher	Ilusis Interactive Graphics	Unreleased	August 5, 2016	April 7, 2015	D	
Kung-Fu Live	Virtual Air Guitar	Unreleased	December 8, 2010	December 7, 2010	D E	
Kung Fu Panda	Luxoflux	Unreleased	June 27, 2008	June 3, 2008		
Kung Fu Panda 2	Griptonite Games	Unreleased	June 10, 2011	May 24, 2011		
Kung Fu Panda: Showdown of Legendary Legends	Vicious Cycle Software	Unreleased	November 27, 2015	December 1, 2015		
Kung Fu Rabbit	Bulkypix	Unreleased	August 27, 2014	August 19, 2014	D	
Kung Fu Rider	Japan Studio	October 21, 2010	September 17, 2010	September 17, 2010	M	
L.A. Noire	Team Bondi	July 7, 2011	May 20, 2011	May 17, 2011		
L@ve Once: Mermaid's Tears	Silicon Studio	February 24, 2011	Unreleased	Unreleased		
La Voz Vol. 2	Creat Studios	Unreleased	October 17, 2014	Unreleased		
La Voz Vol. 3	Creat Studios	Unreleased	November 13, 2015	Unreleased		
Labyrinth Legends	Creat Studios	Unreleased	December 19, 2012	December 18, 2012	D	
Lair	Factor 5	October 11, 2007	November 16, 2007	August 30, 2007		
Landit Bandit	The Bearded Ladies	Unreleased	June 23, 2010	July 13, 2010	D	
Lara Croft and the Guardian of Light	Crystal Dynamics	September 28, 2010	September 29, 2010	September 28, 2010	D	
The Last of Us	Naughty Dog	June 20, 2013	June 14, 2013	June 14, 2013		
Last Rebellion	Hit Maker	January 28, 2010	March 26, 2010	February 23, 2010		
Lead and Gold: Gangs of the Wild West	Fatshark	November 30, 2010	April 22, 2010	May 4, 2010	D	
Learning with The PooYoos: Episode 1	Lexis Numérique	Unreleased	Unreleased	June 2, 2011	D	
Learning with The PooYoos: Episode 2	Lexis Numérique	Unreleased	November 23, 2011	November 22, 2011	D	
Legendary	Spark Unlimited	Unreleased	October 31, 2008	November 4, 2008		
Legend of Kay Anniversary	Kaiko	Unreleased	July 28, 2015	July 28, 2015	D	
Legend of Robots	The Bearded Ladies Consulting	Unreleased	July 13, 2011	Unreleased	D	
Legend of the Guardians: The Owls of Ga'Hoole	Krome Studios	Unreleased	September 14, 2010	September 14, 2010		
The Legend of Heroes: Trails in the Sky Kai HD Edition	Nihon Falcom	December 13, 2012	Unreleased	Unreleased		
The Legend of Heroes: Trails in the Sky SC Kai HD Edition	Nihon Falcom	April 25, 2013	Unreleased	Unreleased		
The Legend of Heroes: Trails in the Sky the 3rd Kai HD Edition	Nihon Falcom	June 27, 2013	Unreleased	Unreleased		
The Legend of Heroes: Trails of Cold Steel	Nihon Falcom	September 26, 2013	January 29, 2016	December 22, 2015		
The Legend of Heroes: Trails of Cold Steel II	Nihon Falcom	September 25, 2014	November 11, 2016	September 6, 2016		
The Legend of Spyro: Dawn of the Dragon	Étranges Libellules	Unreleased	November 28, 2008	October 21, 2008		
Lego Batman: The Videogame	Traveller's Tales	December 8, 2008	October 10, 2008	September 23, 2008		
Lego Batman 2: DC Super Heroes	Traveller's Tales	Unreleased	June 19, 2012	June 22, 2012		
Lego Batman 3: Beyond Gotham	Traveller's Tales	November 26, 2014	November 11, 2014	November 14, 2014		
Lego Dimensions Starter Pack	Traveller's Tales	Unreleased	September 27, 2015	September 27, 2015		
Lego Harry Potter: Years 1–4	Traveller's Tales	April 21, 2011	June 25, 2010	June 29, 2010		
Lego Harry Potter: Years 5-7	Traveller's Tales	Unreleased	November 18, 2011	November 11, 2011		
Lego Indiana Jones: The Original Adventures	Traveller's Tales	Unreleased	June 6, 2008	June 3, 2008		
Lego Indiana Jones 2: The Adventure Continues	Traveller's Tales	Unreleased	November 20, 2009	November 17, 2009		
Lego Jurassic World	TT Fusion	November 5, 2015	June 30, 2015	June 30, 2015		
The Lego Movie Videogame	TT Fusion	Unreleased	February 14, 2014	February 14, 2014		
Lego Lord Of The Rings	Traveller's Tales	Unreleased	November 23, 2012	November 23, 2012		
Lego Marvel's Avengers	Traveller's Tales	Unreleased	January 27, 2016	January 26, 2016		
Lego Marvel Super Heroes	Traveller's Tales	January 22, 2015	November 23, 2013	November 23, 2013		
Lego Pirates of the Caribbean: The Video Game	Traveller's Tales	Unreleased	May 13, 2011	May 10, 2011		
Lego Rock Band	TT Fusion / Harmonix	Unreleased	November 27, 2009	November 3, 2009		
Lego Star Wars: The Complete Saga	Traveller's Tales	March 27, 2008	November 9, 2007	November 6, 2007		
Lego Star Wars: The Force Awakens	TT Fusion	October 13, 2016	June 28, 2016	June 28, 2016		
Lego Star Wars III: The Clone Wars	Traveller's Tales	February 28, 2011	March 25, 2011	March 22, 2011		
Lego The Hobbit	Traveller's Tales	Unreleased	April 11, 2014	April 11, 2014		
Lemmings	Team17	Unreleased	March 23, 2007	December 7, 2006	D M	
Let's Dance With Mel B	Unknown	Unreleased	April 24, 2012	Unreleased		
Le Tour de France	Cyanide Studio	Unreleased	June 23, 2011	June 23, 2011		
Le Tour de France 2012	Cyanide Studio	Unreleased	June 22, 2012	June 22, 2012		
Le Tour de France 2013	Cyanide Studio	Unreleased	June 20, 2013	June 20, 2013		
Le Tour de France 2014	Cyanide Studio	Unreleased	June 20, 2014	June 20, 2014		
Le Tour de France 2015	Cyanide	Unreleased	June 17, 2015	June 23, 2015		
Leisure Suit Larry: Box Office Bust	Team17	Unreleased	April 24, 2009	May 5, 2009		
Level 22	Moving Player	Unreleased	February 11, 2016	February 11, 2016	D	
Life Is Strange	Dontnod Entertainment	March 3, 2016	January 30, 2015	January 30, 2015	D	
Lightning Returns: Final Fantasy XIII	Square Enix	November 21, 2013	February 14, 2014	February 11, 2014		
Lights, Camera, Party!	Frima Studio	Unreleased	August 29, 2012	August 28, 2012	D	
Little League Baseball World Series 2010	Now Production	Unreleased	Unreleased	July 20, 2010	M	
Limbo	Playdead	August 4, 2011	July 20, 2011	July 19, 2011	D	
Linger in Shadows	Plastic	December 4, 2008	October 9, 2008	October 9, 2008	D	
LittleBigPlanet	Media Molecule	October 30, 2008	November 5, 2008	October 27, 2008	E	
LittleBigPlanet 2	Media Molecule	February 10, 2011	January 19, 2011	January 18, 2011	M E	
LittleBigPlanet 2: Special Edition (Note: update for LittleBigPlanet 2.)	Media Molecule	Unreleased	November 15, 2011	November 15, 2011	M E	
LittleBigPlanet 3	Sumo Digital	December 4, 2014	November 26, 2014	November 18, 2014		
LittleBigPlanet Karting	United Front Games	January 17, 2013	November 7, 2012	November 6, 2012		
Little Busters! Converted Edition	Key / Prototype	March 20, 2013	Unreleased	Unreleased		
LocoRoco Cocoreccho	Japan Studio	September 20, 2007	September 20, 2007	September 20, 2007	D	
Lollipop Chainsaw	Grasshopper Manufacture	June 14, 2012	June 15, 2012	June 12, 2012		
London 2012	Sega	Unreleased	June 29, 2012	June 26, 2012	M	
Lone Survivor: The Director's Cut	superflat games	Unreleased	September 25, 2013	September 24, 2013	D	
The Lord of the Rings: Aragorn's Quest	TT Fusion / Headstrong Games	Unreleased	October 29, 2010	September 14, 2010	M	
The Lord of the Rings: Conquest	Pandemic Studios	Unreleased	January 16, 2009	January 13, 2009		
The Lord of the Rings: War in the North	Snowblind Studios	Unreleased	November 9, 2011	November 1, 2011		
Los 40 Principales: Karaoke Party	Le Cortex	Unreleased	November 14, 2014	Unreleased		
Los 40 Principales: Karaoke Party Vol. 2	Le Cortex	Unreleased	November 13, 2015	Unreleased		
Lost Dimension	Lancarse	August 7, 2014	July 28, 2014	July 28, 2015		
Lost Planet: Extreme Condition	Capcom / K2 LLC	February 21, 2008	February 29, 2008	February 26, 2008		
Lost Planet 2	Capcom	May 20, 2010	May 11, 2010	May 11, 2010		
Lost Planet 3	Spark Unlimited	August 29, 2013	August 30, 2013	August 27, 2013		
Lost: Via Domus	Ubisoft Montreal	Unreleased	February 29, 2008	February 26, 2008		
Lucha Libre AAA 2010: Héroes del Ring	Immersion Software & Graphics	Unreleased	Unreleased	October 12, 2010		
Luftrausers	Vlambeer	February 19, 2015	March 19, 2014	March 18, 2014	D	
Lumines Supernova	Q Entertainment	December 18, 2008	February 5, 2009	December 23, 2008	D	
Machi-ing Maker 4	D3 Publisher	December 23, 2011	Unreleased	Unreleased		
Machinarium	Amanita Design	December 24, 2014	September 6, 2012	October 9, 2012	D	
Macross 30: Voices across the Galaxy	Artdink	February 28, 2013	Unreleased	Unreleased		
Mad Dog II: The Lost Gold	Digital Leisure	Unreleased	May 15, 2013	April 16, 2013	D	
Mad Dog McCree	Digital Leisure	Unreleased	January 23, 2013	January 22, 2013	D	
Mad Riders	Techland	Unreleased	May 30, 2012	May 29, 2012	D	
Madagascar: Escape 2 Africa	Toys For Bob	Unreleased	November 28, 2008	November 4, 2008		
Madagascar 3: The Video Game	Toys For Bob	Unreleased	June 5, 2012	June 5, 2012		
Madagascar Kartz	Sidhe	Unreleased	November 6, 2009	October 27, 2009		
Madden NFL 07	EA Tiburon	April 26, 2007	July 30, 2007	November 17, 2006		
Madden NFL 08	EA Tiburon	Unreleased	October 5, 2007	August 14, 2007		
Madden NFL 09	EA Tiburon	September 25, 2008	August 15, 2008	August 12, 2008		
Madden NFL 10	EA Tiburon	Unreleased	August 18, 2009	August 14, 2009		
Madden NFL 11	EA Tiburon	Unreleased	August 13, 2010	August 10, 2010		
Madden NFL 12	EA Tiburon	Unreleased	September 2, 2011	August 30, 2011		
Madden NFL 13	EA Tiburon	Unreleased	August 31, 2012	August 28, 2012		
Madden NFL 15	EA Tiburon	Unreleased	August 29, 2014	August 26, 2014		
Madden NFL 16	EA Tiburon	Unreleased	August 25, 2015	August 25, 2015		
Madden NFL 17	EA Tiburon	Unreleased	August 23, 2016	August 23, 2016		
Madden NFL 25	EA Tiburon	Unreleased	August 27, 2013	August 27, 2013		
Madden NFL Arcade	EA Sports	December 3, 2009	November 26, 2009	November 24, 2009	D	
Mafia II	2K Czech	Unreleased	August 27, 2010	August 24, 2010		
MAG	Zipper Interactive	Unreleased	January 29, 2010	January 26, 2010	M	
Magic Orbz	Creat Studios	Unreleased	January 15, 2009	January 15, 2009	D	
Magic: The Gathering – Duels of the Planeswalkers	Stainless Games	Unreleased	December 22, 2010	November 23, 2010	D	
Magic: The Gathering – Duels of the Planeswalkers 2012	Stainless Games	July 6, 2011	June 15, 2011	June 14, 2011	D	
Magic: The Gathering – Duels of the Planeswalkers 2013	Stainless Games	June 21, 2012	June 20, 2012	June 19, 2012	D	
Magic: The Gathering – Duels of the Planeswalkers 2014	Stainless Games	June 27, 2013	June 26, 2013	June 25, 2013	D	
Magical Beat	Arc System Works	August 5, 2014	Unreleased	Unreleased	D	
Magrunner: Dark Pulse	Frogwares	Unreleased	October 23, 2013	October 22, 2013	D	
Magus	Aksys Games	Unreleased	February 25, 2014	June 4, 2014		
Mahjong ★ Dream C Club	Tamsoft	April 5, 2012	Unreleased	Unreleased		
Mahjong Haoh: Dankyuu Battle 3	NCS	October 31, 2013	Unreleased	Unreleased		
Mahjong Kakutou Club	Konami	November 16, 2006	Unreleased	Unreleased		
Mahjong Taikai IV	Koei	November 22, 2006	Unreleased	Unreleased		
Mahjong Tales: Ancient Wisdom	Creat Studios	Unreleased	December 23, 2008	January 8, 2009	D	
Mahjong World	Recom	February 26, 2010	Unreleased	Unreleased	D	
Mahjong World W (Note: update for Mahjong World.)	Recom	April 20, 2015	Unreleased	Unreleased	D	
Mainichi Issho	Japan Studio	November 11, 2006	Unreleased	Unreleased	D	
Maji de Watashi ni Koi Shinasai! R	Minato Station	February 23, 2012	Unreleased	Unreleased		
Majin and the Forsaken Kingdom	Game Republic	January 20, 2011	November 26, 2010	November 23, 2010		
Major League Baseball 2K7	Kush Games	Unreleased	Unreleased	February 26, 2007		
Major League Baseball 2K8	Kush Games	Unreleased	Unreleased	March 4, 2008		
Major League Baseball 2K9	Visual Concepts	July 9, 2009	Unreleased	March 3, 2009		
Major League Baseball 2K10	Visual Concepts	Unreleased	Unreleased	March 2, 2010		
Major League Baseball 2K11	Visual Concepts	Unreleased	Unreleased	March 8, 2011		
Major League Baseball 2K12	Visual Concepts	Unreleased	Unreleased	March 6, 2012		
Major League Baseball 2K13	Visual Concepts	Unreleased	Unreleased	March 5, 2013		
Makai Senki Disgaea 3 Append Disc: Raspberyl-hen Hajime Mashita (Note: DLC for Disgaea 3: Absence of Justice.)	Nippon Ichi Software	September 17, 2009	Unreleased	Unreleased		
Makai Senki Disgaea 4: Fuuka & Desco-hen Hajime Mashita (Note: update for Disgaea 4: A Promise Unforgotten (regular full-game edition))	Nippon Ichi Software	October 27, 2011	Unreleased	Unreleased		
Malicious	Alvion	October 27, 2010	February 8, 2012	July 24, 2012	D	
Mamorukun Curse!	Gulti	March 31, 2011	Unreleased	July 16, 2013		
Man vs. Wild	Scientifically Proven	Unreleased	Unreleased	April 26, 2011		
Mars: War Logs	Spiders	Unreleased	August 13, 2013	August 13, 2013	D	
Marvel Pinball	Zen Studios	Unreleased	December 15, 2010	December 14, 2010	D	
Marvel Puzzle Quest: Dark Reign	WayForward Technologies	Unreleased	October 26, 2015	October 16, 2015	D	
Marvel Super Hero Squad: Comic Combat	Griptonite Games	Unreleased	November 15, 2011	November 15, 2011		
Marvel Super Hero Squad: The Infinity Gauntlet	Griptonite Games	Unreleased	November 19, 2010	November 19, 2010		
Marvel: Ultimate Alliance	Raven Software	May 17, 2007	March 23, 2007	November 17, 2006		
Marvel: Ultimate Alliance 2	Vicarious Visions	Unreleased	September 25, 2009	September 15, 2009		
Marvel vs. Capcom 3: Fate of Two Worlds	Capcom	February 17, 2011	February 18, 2011	February 15, 2011		
Marvel vs. Capcom 2	Backbone Entertainment	August 13, 2009	August 13, 2009	August 13, 2009		
Marvel vs. Capcom Origins (Marvel Super Heroes, Marvel vs. Capcom: Clash of Super Heroes)	Capcom	Unreleased	October 10, 2012	September 25, 2012	D	
Masquerade: The Baubles of Doom	Big Ant Studios	Unreleased	April 20, 2016	April 19, 2016	D	
Mass Effect	BioWare / Electronic Arts	December 4, 2012	December 4, 2012	December 4, 2012		
Mass Effect 2	BioWare / Electronic Arts	June 23, 2011	January 21, 2011	January 18, 2011		
Mass Effect 3	BioWare / Electronic Arts	March 15, 2012	March 9, 2012	March 6, 2012		
Master Reboot	Wales Interactive	Unreleased	March 5, 2014	March 4, 2014	D	
Matt Hazard: Blood Bath and Beyond	Vicious Cycle Software	February 18, 2010	January 7, 2010	January 7, 2010	D	
Max & the Magic Marker: Gold Edition	Press Play	Unreleased	September 28, 2011	November 1, 2011	D	
Max Payne 3	Rockstar Studios	May 18, 2012	May 18, 2012	May 15, 2012		
Mayhem	Left Field Productions	Unreleased	Unreleased	March 25, 2011		
Medal of Honor	EA Los Angeles / EA Digital Illusions CE	Unreleased	October 14, 2010	October 12, 2010		
Medal of Honor: Airborne	EA Los Angeles	December 20, 2007	December 12, 2007	November 19, 2007		
Medal of Honor: Frontline	EA Los Angeles	Unreleased	October 15, 2010	October 15, 2010		
Medal of Honor: Warfighter	EA Los Angeles	October 25, 2012	October 26, 2012	November 15, 2012		
Medieval Moves: Deadmund's Quest	Zindagi Games	Unreleased	November 11, 2011	November 11, 2011	3D M	
Mega Man 9	Inti Creates	June 24, 2009	September 25, 2008	September 25, 2008	D	
Mega Man 10	Inti Creates	March 9, 2010	March 11, 2010	March 11, 2010	D	
Megamind: Ultimate Showdown	THQ Studio Australia	Unreleased	November 2, 2010	November 2, 2010		
Megazone 23: Aoi Garland	Compile Heart	September 13, 2007	Unreleased	Unreleased		
Meikyuu Touro Legasista	Nippon Ichi Software	March 15, 2012	Unreleased	Unreleased		
Memories Off: Yubikiri no Kioku	5pb.	June 27, 2013	Unreleased	Unreleased		
Memories Off 6 Complete	5pb.	June 27, 2013	Unreleased	Unreleased		
Men in Black: Alien Crisis	Activision	Unreleased	May 22, 2012	May 22, 2012		
Mercenaries 2: World in Flames	Pandemic Studios	November 30, 2008	September 5, 2008	August 31, 2008		
Mercia: Fractured Realms	Lockwood Publishing	Unreleased	Unreleased	August 31, 2012	D	
Mercury Hg	UTV Ignition Entertainment	Unreleased	September 28, 2011	September 27, 2011	D	
Mesmerize: Distort (app)	London Studio, Playlogic Entertainment	December 20, 2007	December 20, 2007	December 20, 2007	D E	
Mesmerize: Trace (app)	London Studio, Playlogic Entertainment	December 20, 2007	December 20, 2007	December 20, 2007	D E	
Metal Gear Online	Kojima Productions	July 17, 2008	Unreleased	Unreleased		
Metal Gear Rising: Revengeance	PlatinumGames	February 21, 2013	February 21, 2013	February 19, 2013		
Metal Gear Solid 2: Sons of Liberty HD Edition	Kojima Productions	December 8, 2011	August 21, 2012	August 21, 2012	D	
Metal Gear Solid 3: Snake Eater HD Edition	Kojima Productions	December 8, 2011	August 21, 2012	August 21, 2012	D	
Metal Gear Solid 4: Guns of the Patriots	Kojima Productions	June 12, 2008	June 12, 2008	June 12, 2008		
Metal Gear Solid V: Ground Zeroes	Kojima Productions	March 20, 2014	March 20, 2014	March 18, 2014		
Metal Gear Solid V: The Phantom Pain	Kojima Productions	September 1, 2015	September 1, 2015	September 1, 2015		
Metal Gear Solid: Peace Walker HD Edition	Kojima Productions	December 8, 2011	August 21, 2012	August 21, 2012		
Metal Slug 3	SNK	May 14, 2015	April 29, 2015	March 24, 2015	D	
Metro: Last Light	4A Games	Unreleased	May 17, 2013	May 14, 2013		
Michael Jackson: The Experience	Ubisoft Montpellier, Ubisoft Paris	December 8, 2011	April 15, 2011	April 12, 2011	M E	
MicroBot	Naked Sky Entertainment	February 10, 2011	January 5, 2011	January 4, 2011	D	
Middle-earth: Shadow of Mordor	Monolith Productions	Unreleased	November 21, 2014	November 18, 2014		
Midnight Club: Los Angeles	Rockstar San Diego	Unreleased	October 24, 2008	October 21, 2008		
Midway Arcade Origins	Backbone Entertainment	Unreleased	November 6, 2012	November 6, 2012		
Might & Magic: Clash of Heroes HD	Capybara Games	Unreleased	April 13, 2011	April 12, 2011	D	
Might & Magic: Duel of Champions – Forgotten Wars	Ubisoft	Unreleased	July 23, 2014	July 22, 2014	D	
Mighty No. 9	Comcept	June 21, 2016	June 24, 2016	June 21, 2016	D	
Military Madness: Nectaris	Backbone Entertainment	November 18, 2009	January 7, 2010	November 5, 2009	D	
Mindjack	feelplus	January 27, 2011	January 21, 2011	January 18, 2011		
Minecraft: PlayStation 3 Edition	4j Studios	May 15, 2014	May 15, 2014	May 15, 2014		
Minecraft: Story Mode	Telltale Games	October 30, 2015	October 30, 2015	October 30, 2015		
Mini Ninjas	IO Interactive	Unreleased	September 11, 2009	September 8, 2009		
Mirror's Edge	EA Digital Illusions CE	Unreleased	November 13, 2008	November 11, 2008		
Minnya no Putter Golf	SCEI	December 18, 2008	Unreleased	Unreleased	D	
Mist of Chaos	Idea Factory / Neverland Co.	March 22, 2007	Unreleased	Unreleased		
Mix Superstar	Digital Leisure	Unreleased	January 23, 2013	December 11, 2012	D	
Miyasato Miyoshi Kyoudai Naizou: Sega Golf Club	Sega	November 11, 2006	Unreleased	Unreleased		
MLB 07: The Show	San Diego Studio	Unreleased	Unreleased	May 15, 2007		
MLB 08: The Show	San Diego Studio	Unreleased	Unreleased	March 4, 2008		
MLB 09: The Show	San Diego Studio	Unreleased	Unreleased	March 3, 2009		
MLB 10: The Show	San Diego Studio	Unreleased	Unreleased	March 2, 2010		
MLB 11: The Show	San Diego Studio	Unreleased	Unreleased	March 8, 2011	3D M	
MLB 12: The Show	San Diego Studio	Unreleased	Unreleased	March 6, 2012	3D SV M	
MLB 13: The Show	San Diego Studio	Unreleased	March 5, 2013	March 5, 2013	3D SV M	
MLB 14: The Show	San Diego Studio	Unreleased	April 2, 2014	April 1, 2014	3D M	
MLB 15: The Show	San Diego Studio	Unreleased	Unreleased	March 31, 2015		
MLB 16: The Show	San Diego Studio	Unreleased	Unreleased	March 29, 2016		
MLB Bobblehead	Konami	September 29, 2011	Unreleased	Unreleased		
MLB Front Office Manager	Blue Castle Games	Unreleased	Unreleased	January 26, 2009		
MLB The Show: Home Run Derby	San Diego Studio	Unreleased	Unreleased	July 2, 2013	D	
Mobile Suit Gundam Battlefield Record U.C. 0081	Namco Bandai	September 3, 2009	Unreleased	Unreleased		
Mobile Suit Gundam: Crossfire •Mobile Suit Gundam: Target in Sight^{EU/AUS} •Kidou Senshi Gundam: Target in Sight^{JP}	Namco Bandai	November 11, 2006	March 23, 2007	November 13, 2006		
Mobile Suit Gundam: Battle Operation	Bandai Namco Entertainment	June 28, 2012	Unreleased	Unreleased	D	
Mobile Suit Gundam: Extreme Vs.	Namco Bandai	December 1, 2011	Unreleased	Unreleased		
Mobile Suit Gundam: Extreme Vs. Full Boost	Namco Bandai	January 30, 2014	Unreleased	Unreleased		
Mobile Suit Gundam Side Stories	Namco Bandai	April 29, 2014	Unreleased	Unreleased		
Mobile Suit Gundam Unicorn	From Software	March 8, 2012	Unreleased	Unreleased		
Modern Combat: Domination	Gameloft	February 15, 2011	January 19, 2011	January 18, 2011	D M	
ModNation Racers	United Front Games / San Diego Studio	July 29, 2010	May 21, 2010	May 25, 2010		
Moe Moe Daisensou * Gendaiban++	SystemSoft	March 8, 2012	Unreleased	Unreleased		
Monkey Island Special Edition Collection	LucasArts	Unreleased	September 9, 2011	September 9, 2011		
Monopoly	EA Casual Entertainment	Unreleased	October 24, 2008	October 21, 2008		
Monopoly Deal	Asobo Studio	Unreleased	January 21, 2015	January 13, 2015	D	
Monopoly Plus	Asobo Studio	Unreleased	January 28, 2015	January 13, 2015	D	
Monopoly Streets	EA Casual Entertainment	Unreleased	October 26, 2010	October 26, 2010		
Monster High: New Ghoul in School	Torus Games	Unreleased	November 17, 2015	November 17, 2015		
Monster Hunter Frontier G	Capcom	November 20, 2013	Unreleased	Unreleased		
Monster Hunter Frontier G5 (Note: update for Monster Hunter Frontier G.)	Capcom	July 23, 2014	Unreleased	Unreleased		
Monster Hunter Frontier G6 (Note: update for Monster Hunter Frontier G.)	Capcom	November 19, 2014	Unreleased	Unreleased		
Monster Hunter Frontier G7 (Note: update for Monster Hunter Frontier G.)	Capcom	April 15, 2015	Unreleased	Unreleased	D	
Monster Hunter Frontier G8 (Note: update for Monster Hunter Frontier G.)	Capcom	July 22, 2015	Unreleased	Unreleased	D	
Monster Hunter Frontier G9 (Note: update for Monster Hunter Frontier G.)	Capcom	November 18, 2015	Unreleased	Unreleased	D	
Monster Hunter Frontier G10 (Note: update for Monster Hunter Frontier G.)	Capcom	April 21, 2016	Unreleased	Unreleased	D	
Monster Hunter Frontier GG (Note: update for Monster Hunter Frontier G.)	Capcom	April 23, 2014	Unreleased	Unreleased		
Monster Hunter Frontier Z (Note: update for Monster Hunter Frontier G.)	Capcom	November 9, 2016	Unreleased	Unreleased	D	
Monster Hunter Portable 3rd HD Ver.	Capcom	August 25, 2011	Unreleased	Unreleased		
Monster Jam: Path of Destruction	Activision	Unreleased	November 9, 2010	November 9, 2010		
Monster Jam Battlegrounds	Team 6	Unreleased	May 24, 2016	July 14, 2015	D	
Monster Madness: Grave Danger	Psyonix Studios / Immersion Games	Unreleased	September 5, 2008	August 5, 2008		
Monsters vs. Aliens	Beenox / Amaze Entertainment	Unreleased	March 27, 2009	March 24, 2009		
Monster World IV	Sega	May 23, 2012	May 23, 2012	May 22, 2012	D	
Moon Diver	feelplus	March 29, 2011	March 30, 2011	March 29, 2011	D	
Mortal Kombat	NetherRealm Studios	Unreleased	April 21, 2011	April 19, 2011	3D	
Mortal Kombat vs. DC Universe	Midway Games	Unreleased	November 21, 2008	November 16, 2008		
Mortal Kombat Arcade Kollection (Mortal Kombat, Mortal Kombat II, Ultimate Mortal Kombat 3)	Warner Bros. Interactive	Unreleased	December 7, 2011	August 30, 2011	D	
Mortal Kombat II	Sony Online Entertainment	Unreleased	June 8, 2007	April 12, 2007	D	
MotionSports Adrenaline	Ubisoft Milan	Unreleased	November 11, 2011	November 11, 2011	M	
MotoGP '08	Milestone	Unreleased	October 24, 2008	October 28, 2008		
MotoGP 09/10	Monumental Games	Unreleased	March 19, 2010	March 23, 2010		
MotoGP 10/11	Monumental Games	Unreleased	March 15, 2011	March 15, 2011		
MotoGP 13	Milestone srl	Unreleased	June 21, 2013	June 21, 2013		
MotoGP 14	Milestone srl	Unreleased	June 20, 2014	November 4, 2014		
MotoGP 15	Milestone srl	Unreleased	June 24, 2015	June 24, 2015		
Motorbike	baKno Games	Unreleased	October 23, 2013	June 25, 2013	D	
Motorcycle Club	Kylotonn	Unreleased	November 28, 2014	January 20, 2015		
MotorStorm	Evolution Studios	December 14, 2006	March 23, 2007	March 6, 2007		
MotorStorm: 3D Rift	Evolution Studios	Unreleased	August 24, 2010	August 25, 2010	D 3D SV	
MotorStorm: Apocalypse	Evolution Studios	Unreleased	March 16, 2011	May 3, 2011	3D SV	
MotorStorm: Pacific Rift	Evolution Studios	October 31, 2008	November 7, 2008	October 28, 2008		
MotorStorm: RC	Evolution Studios	March 19, 2012	February 22, 2012	March 6, 2012	D 3D	
Motto! SoniComi	Nitroplus	March 20, 2014	Unreleased	Unreleased		
Mountain Crime: Requital	Alawar	Unreleased	March 13, 2013	May 28, 2013	D	
MouseCraft	Crunching Koalas	February 3, 2016	July 9, 2014	July 8, 2014	D	
Move Fitness	ColdWood Interactive	Unreleased	March 11, 2013	Unreleased		
Move Mind Benders	XDEV	Unreleased	November 11, 2011	Unreleased		
Move Street Cricket	Trine Game Studios	Unreleased	February 15, 2012	Unreleased		
Move Street Cricket 2	Trine Game Studios	Unreleased	May 15, 2013	Unreleased		
Ms. Germinator	Creat Studios	Unreleased	August 14, 2013	August 20, 2013	D	
MUD FIM Motocross World Championship	Milestone srl	Unreleased	April 25, 2012	February 26, 2012		
Mugen Souls	Compile Heart	March 22, 2012	September 28, 2012	October 16, 2012		
Mugen Souls Z	Compile Heart	April 25, 2013	May 23, 2014	May 20, 2014		
Murdered: Soul Suspect	Airtight Games	July 17, 2014	June 6, 2014	June 3, 2014		
Mushroom Wars	Creat Studios	Unreleased	October 15, 2009	October 15, 2009	D	
Musou Orochi Z	Omega Force	March 12, 2009	Unreleased	Unreleased		
Mutant Mudds Deluxe	Renegade Kid	Unreleased	Unreleased	December 17, 2013	D	
Muv-Luv	5pb.	October 5, 2012	Unreleased	Unreleased		
Muv-Luv Alternative	5pb.	October 25, 2012	Unreleased	Unreleased		
Muv-Luv Alternative: Total Eclipse	5pb.	May 16, 2013	Unreleased	Unreleased		
Muv-Luv Photon flowers	5pb.	April 24, 2014	Unreleased	Unreleased		
Muv-Luv Photon Melodies	5pb.	October 28, 2014	Unreleased	Unreleased		
MXGP The Official Motocross Videogame	Milestone srl	Unreleased	November 18, 2014	November 18, 2014		
MX vs. ATV: Untamed	Rainbow Studios	Unreleased	March 7, 2008	December 17, 2007		
MX vs. ATV Alive	Rainbow Studios	Unreleased	May 10, 2011	May 10, 2011		
MX vs. ATV Reflex	Rainbow Studios	Unreleased	February 5, 2010	December 1, 2009		
MX vs. ATV Supercross	Rainbow Studios	Unreleased	August 28, 2014	August 28, 2014		
My Aquarium	Hudson Soft	September 8, 2010	September 15, 2010	September 14, 2010	D	
My Body Coach 2	Ubisoft	Unreleased	March 18, 2011	Unreleased		
MySims SkyHeroes	Electronic Arts	Unreleased	October 1, 2010	September 28, 2010		
Nail'd	Techland	April 21, 2011	February 4, 2011	November 30, 2010		
Namco Museum Essentials (Dig Dug, Dragon Spirit, Galaga, Pac-Man, Xevious, Xevious Resurrection)	Bandai Namco Entertainment	January 29, 2009	April 1, 2010	July 16, 2009		
Naruto: Ultimate Ninja Storm	CyberConnect2	January 15, 2009	November 7, 2008	November 4, 2008		
Narco Terror	Keen Software House Ltd	Unreleased	July 31, 2013	July 30, 2013		
Naruto Shippuden: Ultimate Ninja Storm 2	CyberConnect2	October 21, 2010	October 15, 2010	October 19, 2010		
Naruto Shippuden: Ultimate Ninja Storm 3	CyberConnect2	April 18, 2013	March 8, 2013	March 5, 2013		
Naruto Shippuden: Ultimate Ninja Storm 3 Full Burst (Note: update for Naruto Shippuden: Ultimate Ninja Storm 3.)	CyberConnect2	Unreleased	October 22, 2013	October 22, 2013		
Naruto Shippuden: Ultimate Ninja Storm Generations	CyberConnect2	February 23, 2012	March 30, 2012	March 13, 2012		
Naruto Shippuden: Ultimate Ninja Storm Revolution	CyberConnect2	September 11, 2014	September 16, 2014	September 12, 2014		
NASCAR 08	EA Tiburon	Unreleased	August 10, 2007	July 23, 2007		
NASCAR 09	EA Tiburon	Unreleased	June 27, 2008	June 10, 2008		
NASCAR 2011: The Game	Eutechnyx	Unreleased	Unreleased	March 29, 2011		
NASCAR 2014	Eutechnyx	Unreleased	Unreleased	February 18, 2014		
NASCAR 2015	Eutechnyx	Unreleased	Unreleased	March 22, 2015		
NASCAR The Game: Inside Line	Eutechnyx	Unreleased	Unreleased	November 6, 2012		
NASCAR Unleashed	Firebrand Games	Unreleased	Unreleased	November 1, 2011		
Nat Geo Challenge! Wild Life	Gusto Games	Unreleased	June 25, 2010	November 16, 2010		
National Geographic Challenge!	Gusto Games	Unreleased	November 29, 2011	April 8, 2011		
Natsuiro High School: Seishun Hakusho	Tamsoft	June 4, 2015	Unreleased	Unreleased		
Natural Doctrine	Kadokawa Games	April 3, 2014	October 3, 2014	September 30, 2014		
Naughty Bear	Artificial Mind and Movement	Unreleased	June 25, 2010	June 29, 2010		
Naughty Bear: Panic in Paradise	Behaviour Interactive	Unreleased	October 10, 2012	October 9, 2012		
NBA 07	San Diego Studio	January 7, 2007	Unreleased	November 17, 2006		
NBA 08	San Diego Studio	Unreleased	February 15, 2008	October 12, 2007		
NBA 09: The Inside	San Diego Studio	Unreleased	Unreleased	October 7, 2008		
NBA 2K7	Visual Concepts / Kush Games	Unreleased	April 27, 2007	November 17, 2006		
NBA 2K8	Visual Concepts / Kush Games	August 7, 2008	November 23, 2007	October 2, 2007		
NBA 2K9	Visual Concepts / Kush Games	March 26, 2009	October 10, 2008	October 7, 2008		
NBA 2K10	Visual Concepts / Kush Games	October 15, 2009	October 6, 2009	October 6, 2009		
NBA 2K10 Draft Combine	Visual Concepts	Unreleased	Unreleased	September 3, 2009		
NBA 2K11	Visual Concepts / Kush Games	October 14, 2010	October 8, 2010	October 5, 2010	3D M	
NBA 2K12	Visual Concepts / Kush Games	October 14, 2011	October 8, 2011	October 5, 2011	3D M	
NBA 2K13	Visual Concepts / Kush Games	Unreleased	August 5, 2012	August 2, 2012		
NBA 2K14	Visual Concepts	November 7, 2013	October 4, 2013	October 1, 2013		
NBA 2K15	Visual Concepts	November 27, 2014	August 10, 2014	August 7, 2014		
NBA 2K16	Visual Concepts	September 29, 2015	September 29, 2015	September 29, 2015		
NBA 2K17	Visual Concepts	September 20, 2016	September 20, 2016	September 20, 2016		
NBA 2K18	Visual Concepts	September 19, 2017	September 19, 2017	September 19, 2017		
NBA Ballers: Chosen One	Midway Games	Unreleased	Unreleased	April 25, 2008		
NBA Jam	EA Canada	Unreleased	November 26, 2010	November 26, 2010		
NBA Jam: On Fire Edition (Note: update for NBA Jam.)	EA Canada	Unreleased	October 5, 2011	October 4, 2011		
NBA Live 08	EA Canada	November 8, 2007	October 26, 2007	October 2, 2007		
NBA Live 09	EA Canada	October 23, 2008	October 10, 2008	October 7, 2008		
NBA Live 10	EA Canada	November 5, 2009	October 9, 2009	October 6, 2009		
NBA Street Homecourt	EA Canada	May 24, 2007	March 23, 2007	March 8, 2007		
NBA Unrivaled	A.C.R.O.N.Y.M. Games	Unreleased	June 23, 2010	April 1, 2010		
NCAA Basketball 09	EA Canada	Unreleased	Unreleased	November 17, 2008		
NCAA Basketball 10	EA Canada	Unreleased	Unreleased	November 18, 2009		
NCAA Football 08	EA Tiburon	Unreleased	Unreleased	July 17, 2007		
NCAA Football 09	EA Tiburon	Unreleased	Unreleased	July 15, 2008		
NCAA Football 10	EA Tiburon	Unreleased	Unreleased	July 14, 2009		
NCAA Football 11	EA Tiburon	Unreleased	Unreleased	July 13, 2010		
NCAA Football 12	EA Tiburon	Unreleased	Unreleased	July 12, 2011		
NCAA Football 13	EA Tiburon	Unreleased	Unreleased	July 13, 2012		
NCAA Football 14	EA Tiburon	Unreleased	Unreleased	July 9, 2013		
NCAA March Madness 08	EA Canada	Unreleased	Unreleased	December 11, 2007		
NCIS	Ubisoft	November 1, 2011	November 1, 2011	November 1, 2011	M	
Need for Speed: Carbon	EA Black Box	December 21, 2006	March 23, 2007	November 16, 2006		
Need for Speed: Hot Pursuit	Criterion Games	December 9, 2010	November 19, 2010	November 16, 2010		
Need for Speed: Most Wanted	Criterion Games	November 15, 2012	November 2, 2012	November 2, 2012	M	
Need for Speed: ProStreet	EA Black Box	January 31, 2008	November 23, 2007	November 13, 2007		
Need for Speed: The Run	EA Black Box	December 8, 2011	November 18, 2011	November 15, 2011		
Need for Speed: Shift	Slightly Mad Studios	November 12, 2009	September 17, 2009	September 15, 2009		
Need for Speed: Undercover	EA Black Box	December 18, 2008	November 21, 2008	November 18, 2008		
Need for Speed: Rivals	Ghost Games	December 12, 2013	November 19, 2013	November 19, 2013		
Never Alone	Upper One Games	Unreleased	December 23, 2015	December 23, 2015		
NeverDead	Rebellion Developments	Unreleased	February 3, 2012	January 31, 2012		
NFL Blitz	EA Tiburon	Unreleased	Unreleased	January 3, 2012		
NFL Head Coach 09	EA Tiburon	Unreleased	Unreleased	September 3, 2008		
NFL Tour	EA Tiburon	Unreleased	January 8, 2008	January 8, 2008		
NHL 08	EA Canada	Unreleased	September 21, 2007	September 12, 2007		
NHL 09	EA Canada	Unreleased	September 26, 2008	September 9, 2008		
NHL 10	EA Canada	Unreleased	September 18, 2009	September 15, 2009		
NHL 11	EA Canada	Unreleased	September 17, 2010	September 7, 2010		
NHL 12	EA Canada	Unreleased	September 9, 2011	September 13, 2011		
NHL 13	EA Canada	Unreleased	September 14, 2011	September 11, 2012		
NHL 14	EA Canada	Unreleased	September 13, 2013	September 10, 2013		
NHL 15	EA Canada	Unreleased	September 12, 2014	September 9, 2014		
NHL 2K7	Visual Concepts / Kush Games	Unreleased	March 23, 2007	November 13, 2006		
NHL 2K8	Visual Concepts / Kush Games	Unreleased	November 2, 2007	September 10, 2007		
NHL 2K9	Visual Concepts	April 29, 2009	September 12, 2008	September 8, 2008		
NHL 2K10	Visual Concepts	October 15, 2009	September 18, 2009	September 15, 2009		
NHL Legacy Edition (Note: update for NHL 15.)	EA Canada	Unreleased	September 17, 2015	September 15, 2015		
Nier	Cavia	April 22, 2010	April 23, 2010	April 27, 2010		
Nier Replicant	Cavia	April 22, 2010	Unreleased	Unreleased		
Ni no Kuni: Wrath of the White Witch	Level-5, Studio Ghibli	November 17, 2011	February 1, 2013	January 22, 2013		
Nights into Dreams...	Sonic Team	October 4, 2012	October 3, 2012	October 2, 2012		
Ninja Gaiden Sigma	Team Ninja	June 14, 2007	July 6, 2007	July 3, 2007		
Ninja Gaiden Sigma 2	Team Ninja	October 1, 2009	October 2, 2009	September 29, 2009		
Ninja Gaiden 3	Team Ninja	March 22, 2012	March 23, 2012	March 20, 2012	M	
Ninja Gaiden 3: Razor's Edge (Note: update for Ninja Gaiden 3.)	Team Ninja	April 4, 2013	April 5, 2013	April 2, 2013		
Nissan GT Academy 2013	SCEI	July 3, 2013	Unreleased	Unreleased		
Nitroplus Blasterz: Heroines Infinite Duel	Nitroplus	December 10, 2015	Unreleased	Unreleased		
Nobunaga no Yabou Online: Houou no Shou (Note: update for Nobunaga no Yabou Online: Shinsei no Shou.) •Nobunaga no Yabou Online: 10-Shuunen Kinen Box^{JP}	Koei	March 7, 2012	Unreleased	Unreleased		
Nobunaga no Yabou Online: Kakusei no Shou (Note: update for Nobunaga no Yabou Online: Shinsei no Shou.)	Koei	December 17, 2014	Unreleased	Unreleased		
Nobunaga no Yabou Online: Shinsei no Shou	Koei	December 22, 2010	Unreleased	Unreleased		
Nobunaga no Yabou Online: Tenka Mugen no Shou (Note: update for Nobunaga no Yabou Online: Shinsei no Shou.)	Koei	July 10, 2013	Unreleased	Unreleased		
Nobunaga no Yabou Online: Yuushi no Shou (Note: update for Nobunaga no Yabou Online: Shinsei no Shou.)	Koei Tecmo	August 3, 2016	Unreleased	Unreleased		
Nobunaga no Yabou: Souzou •Nobunaga's Ambition: Sphere of Influence^{US}	Koei	December 11, 2014	Unreleased	September 1, 2015		
Nobunaga no Yabou: Souzou - Sengoku Risshiden (Note: stand-alone expansion for Nobunaga no Yabou: Souzou.)	Koei	March 24, 2016	Unreleased	Unreleased		
Nobunaga no Yabou: Souzou with power-up kit (Note: update for Nobunaga no Yabou: Souzou.)	Koei	December 11, 2014	Unreleased	Unreleased		
Nobunaga no Yabou: Tendou	Koei	March 4, 2010	Unreleased	Unreleased		
Nobunaga no Yabou: Tendou with Power-Up Kit (Note: update for Nobunaga no Yabou: Tendou.)	Koei	May 26, 2011	Unreleased	Unreleased		
Noby Noby Boy	Bandai Namco Entertainment	February 19, 2009	February 19, 2009	February 19, 2009		
NormalTanks	Beatshapers	Unreleased	March 18, 2010	September 1, 2015	D	
Nova-111	Curve Studios	Unreleased	August 25, 2015	September 1, 2015		
Novastrike	Tiki Games	Unreleased	October 23, 2008	June 5, 2008		
No More Heroes: Heroes' Paradise	feelplus / Grasshopper Manufacture	April 15, 2010	May 20, 2011	August 16, 2011	M	
Novus Prime: Vindication	Hellfire Games	Unreleased	Unreleased	January 11, 2012		
NPPL Championship Paintball 2009	Sand Grain Studios	Unreleased	March 13, 2009	November 18, 2008		
Nucleus	Kuju Entertainment	July 6, 2007	July 12, 2007	July 12, 2007		
Numblast/Qruton	Japan Studio	June 18, 2009	July 2, 2009	November 5, 2009		
Nurarihyon no Mago: Hyakki Ryouran Taisen	Arc System Works	November 17, 2011	Unreleased	Unreleased		
Obut Pétanque	Kylotonn Entertainment	Unreleased	October 19, 2011	Unreleased		
Obut Pétanque 2	Kylotonn Entertainment	Unreleased	December 12, 2012	Unreleased		
Oddworld: Munch's Oddysee HD	Just Add Water / Oddworld Inhabitants	Unreleased	December 19, 2012	December 24, 2012		
Oddworld: New 'n' Tasty!	Just Add Water / Oddworld Inhabitants	Unreleased	April 23, 2015	April 21, 2015		
Oddworld: Stranger's Wrath HD	Just Add Water	Unreleased	December 21, 2011	December 27, 2011	M	
Of Orcs and Men	Cyanide	October 11, 2012	October 11, 2012	October 11, 2012		
Okabu	HandCircus	Unreleased	October 19, 2011	October 18, 2011		
Okami HD	Capcom	November 1, 2012	October 31, 2012	October 30, 2012	M E	
OlliOlli	Roll7	September 24, 2014	August 27, 2014	August 26, 2014		
One Piece: Pirate Warriors •One Piece: Kaizoku Musou^{JP}	Tecmo Koei, Omega Force	March 1, 2012	September 21, 2012	September 25, 2012		
One Piece: Pirate Warriors 2	Tecmo Koei, Omega Force	March 20, 2013	August 30, 2013	September 3, 2013		
One Piece: Pirate Warriors 3	Tecmo Koei, Omega Force	March 26, 2015	August 28, 2015	August 25, 2015		
One Piece: Unlimited World Red	Ganbarion	June 12, 2014	June 27, 2014	July 8, 2014		
Oneechanbara Z Kagura: with NoNoNo!	D3 Publisher	November 7, 2013	Unreleased	Unreleased		
Operation Creature Feature	London Studio, Playlogic Entertainment	Unreleased	October 25, 2007	November 20, 2007	E	
Operation Flashpoint: Dragon Rising	Codemasters	January 14, 2010	October 8, 2009	October 6, 2009		
Operation Flashpoint: Red River	Codemasters	July 28, 2011	April 21, 2011	June 7, 2011		
The Orange Box	EA UK / Valve	Unreleased	December 14, 2007	December 11, 2007		
Onimusha Soul	Capcom	February 25, 2014	Unreleased	Unreleased		
Odin Sphere Leifthrasir	VanillaWare	January 14, 2016	June 24, 2016	June 17, 2016		
Orc Attack: Flatulent Rebellion	Casual Brothers Games	June 30, 2015	October 9, 2013	October 8, 2013		
Order Up!	SuperVillain Studios	Unreleased	December 9, 2011	March 1, 2012	M	
Ore no Imouto ga Konnani Kawaii Wake ga Nai Happy End HD Complete Box	Bandai Namco Games	September 26, 2013	Unreleased	Unreleased		
Oretachi Ni Tsubasa Wa Nai: Under the Innocent Sky	5pb.	April 10, 2014	Unreleased	Unreleased		
Outland	Housemarque	Unreleased	June 2, 2011	June 14, 2011		
OutRun Online Arcade	Sumo Digital	Unreleased	April 16, 2009	Unreleased		
Overlord: Raising Hell	4J Studios / Triumph Studios	Unreleased	June 20, 2008	June 24, 2008		
Overlord II	Triumph Studios	Unreleased	June 26, 2009	June 23, 2009		
Pac-Man and the Ghostly Adventures	Bandai Namco Games	June 25, 2014	March 6, 2014	October 3, 2013		
Pac-Man and the Ghostly Adventures 2	Bandai Namco Games	December 10, 2014	October 2, 2014	October 14, 2014		
Pac-Man Championship Edition DX	Bandai Namco Entertainment	November 24, 2010	November 24, 2010	November 23, 2010		
Pac-Man Championship Edition DX+ (Note: update for Pac-Man Championship Edition DX.)	Bandai Namco Entertainment	September 25, 2013	September 25, 2013	September 25, 2013		
Pac-Man Museum (Ms. Pac-Man, Pac & Pal, Pac-Attack, Pac-Land, Pac-Man, Pac-Man Arrangement, Pac-Man Battle Royale, Pac-Man Championship Edition, Pac-Mania, Super Pac-Man)	Bandai Namco Entertainment	June 25, 2014	February 26, 2014	February 25, 2014		
Pachi Para 15 ~Super Sea in Okinawa 2	Irem	March 25, 2010	Unreleased	Unreleased		
PachiPara 16: Gingira Paradise 2	Irem	October 25, 2010	Unreleased	Unreleased		
Pachi Para 17 ~New Sea Story With Agnes Lum	Irem	February 24, 2011	Unreleased	Unreleased		
Pachinko Hissatsu Shigotonin IV: Kyoraku Collection Vol. 2	Kyouraku Sangyou Holdings	November 15, 2012	Unreleased	Unreleased		
PachiPara DL Hyper Sea Story In Karibu	Sanyo Bussan	July 2, 2008	Unreleased	Unreleased		
Pachislot To Heart 2 •Heartful Simulator Pachi-Slot: To Heart 2^{JP}	Leaf	October 25, 2012	Unreleased	Unreleased		
Pacific Rim: The Video Game	Yuke's Co. Ltd.	November 26, 2013	November 6, 2013	October 15, 2013		
Page Chronica	Red Hare Studios	Unreleased	December 5, 2012	December 4, 2012		
Pain	Idol Minds	February 26, 2009	June 24, 2009	November 29, 2007	3D M	
Painkiller: Hell and Damnation	Nordic Games	Unreleased	June 28, 2013	December 13, 2013		
Papo & Yo	Minority	Unreleased	August 15, 2012	August 14, 2012		
Paranormal Pursuit: The Gifted One	Alawar	Unreleased	April 1, 2015	April 28, 2015		
Payday: The Heist	Overkill Software	Unreleased	October 18, 2010	October 18, 2010		
PAYDAY 2	Starbreeze Studios	Unreleased	August 16, 2013	August 13, 2013		
PDC World Championship Darts: Pro Tour	Kyouraku Sangyou Holdings	Unreleased	Unreleased	December 11, 2014		
Peggle	PopCap Games	Unreleased	February 18, 2010	November 19, 2009		
The Penguins of Madagascar: Dr. Blowhole Returns – Again!	Griptonite Games	Unreleased	September 16, 2011	September 6, 2011		
Penny Arcade Adventures: On the Rain-Slick Precipice of Darkness Episode One	Hothead Games	Unreleased	January 22, 2009	October 23, 2008	D	
Penny Arcade Adventures: On the Rain-Slick Precipice of Darkness Episode Two	Hothead Games	Unreleased	April 23, 2009	December 18, 2008	D	
Persona 4: Arena	Arc System Works	July 26, 2012	May 10, 2013	August 7, 2012		
Persona 4 Arena Ultimax	Arc System Works	August 28, 2014	November 21, 2014	September 30, 2014		
Persona 5	Atlus	September 15, 2016	April 4, 2017	April 4, 2017		
Phantom Breaker: Extra	5pb.	September 19, 2013	Unreleased	Unreleased		
Phineas and Ferb: Across the 2nd Dimension	High Impact Games	Unreleased	September 16, 2011	August 2, 2011	M	
Pictionary: Ultimate Edition	Page 44 Studios	Unreleased	November 18, 2011	November 15, 2011		
Pid	Might and Delight	Unreleased	November 7, 2012	November 6, 2012		
Pier Solar HD	WaterMelon	Unreleased	November 12, 2014	September 30, 2014		
The Pinball Arcade	FarSight Studios	Unreleased	July 11, 2012	April 10, 2012	3D	
Pinball Hall of Fame: The Williams Collection	FarSight Studios	Unreleased	Unreleased	September 22, 2009		
Pinballistik	Creat Studios	Unreleased	October 19, 2011	November 1, 2011	F2P	
Pirates of the Caribbean: At World's End	Eurocom	December 6, 2007	May 25, 2007	May 22, 2007		
PixelJunk 4am (app)	Q-Games	May 15, 2012	May 15, 2012	May 15, 2012	M	
PixelJunk Eden	Q-Games	July 31, 2008	July 31, 2008	July 31, 2008		
PixelJunk Monsters	Q-Games	December 6, 2007	January 24, 2008	January 24, 2008		
PixelJunk Racers	Q-Games	September 20, 2007	October 25, 2007	September 13, 2007		
PixelJunk Racers 2nd Lap (Note: update for PixelJunk Racers.)	Q-Games	July 15, 2010	August 25, 2010	August 24, 2010		
PixelJunk Shooter	Q-Games	December 24, 2009	December 10, 2009	December 10, 2009		
PixelJunk Shooter 2	Q-Games	March 3, 2011	March 2, 2011	March 1, 2011		
PixelJunk SideScroller	Q-Games	November 10, 2011	October 26, 2011	October 25, 2011		
Piyotama	Japan Studio	June 22, 2007	December 14, 2007	August 9, 2007		
Planet 51	Pyro Studios	Unreleased	November 6, 2009	November 17, 2009		
Planet Minigolf	Zen Studios	Unreleased	June 2, 2010	June 1, 2010	M	
Planet Minigolf: Stronghold Island (Note: DLC for Planet Minigolf.)	Zen Studios	Unreleased	Unreleased	September 21, 2010		
Planets Under Attack	Targem Games	Unreleased	November 21, 2012	November 13, 2012		
Plants vs. Zombies	Popcap	Unreleased	February 11, 2011	February 11, 2011		
Plants vs. Zombies: Garden Warfare	Popcap	September 4, 2014	August 22, 2014	August 19, 2014		
PlayStation All-Stars Battle Royale	SuperBot Entertainment / Santa Monica Studio / Bluepoint Games	January 31, 2013	November 21, 2012	November 20, 2012		
PlayStation Home (app)	London Studio	November 20, 2008	December 11, 2008	December 11, 2008		
PlayStation Move Heroes •Gachinko Heroes^{JP}	Nihilistic Software	March 25, 2011	March 25, 2011	March 25, 2011	M	
Playstation Move: Ape Escape	Japan Studio	December 9, 2010	June 22, 2011	July 5, 2011	M	
Poker Night 2	Telltale Games	Unreleased	May 1, 2013	April 30, 2013		
Polar Panic	Eiconic Games	Unreleased	January 28, 2010	December 22, 2009		
Pool Nation	Cherry Pop Games	Unreleased	May 22, 2013	June 25, 2013		
Port Royale 3: Pirates & Merchants	Gaming Minds Studios	Unreleased	Unreleased	October 2, 2012		
Port Royale 3 Gold (Note: update for Port Royale 3: Pirates & Merchants.)	Kalypso	Unreleased	September 3, 2013	September 2, 2013		
Portal 2	Valve	Unreleased	April 21, 2011	April 19, 2011	M	
Power Gig: Rise of the SixString	Seven45 Studios	Unreleased	Unreleased	October 19, 2010		
Power Pro Stadium	Konami	June 26, 2013	Unreleased	Unreleased		
PowerUp Forever	Blitz Arcade	Unreleased	March 19, 2009	December 11, 2008		
Premier Manager	Urbanscan	Unreleased	July 28, 2010	March 22, 2011		
Premier Manager 2012	Urbanscan	Unreleased	November 9, 2011	March 22, 2011		
Press Your Luck	Virtuos	Unreleased	Unreleased	August 24, 2010		
Prince of Persia	Ubisoft Montreal	Unreleased	December 5, 2008	December 2, 2008		
Prince of Persia Classic	Gameloft	Unreleased	October 23, 2008	October 23, 2008		
Prince of Persia: The Forgotten Sands	Ubisoft Montreal	Unreleased	May 21, 2010	May 18, 2010		
Prince of Persia: The Sands of Time	Ubisoft	Unreleased	November 17, 2010	November 16, 2010	3D	
Prince of Persia: The Two Thrones	Ubisoft	Unreleased	December 15, 2010	December 21, 2010	3D	
Prince of Persia: Warrior Within	Ubisoft	Unreleased	December 15, 2010	December 14, 2010	3D	
Prison Break: The Conspiracy	ZootFly	Unreleased	March 26, 2010	March 30, 2010		
PES 2008: Pro Evolution Soccer	Konami	November 22, 2007	October 26, 2007	March 11, 2008	E	
PES 2009: Pro Evolution Soccer	Konami	October 31, 2008	October 17, 2008	November 11, 2008	E	
PES 2010: Pro Evolution Soccer	Konami	November 5, 2009	October 23, 2009	November 3, 2009		
PES 2011: Pro Evolution Soccer	Konami	October 28, 2010	October 8, 2010	October 19, 2010		
PES 2012: Pro Evolution Soccer	Konami	Unreleased	October 14, 2011	September 27, 2011	3D	
PES 2013: Pro Evolution Soccer	Konami	October 4, 2012	September 21, 2012	September 25, 2012	3D	
PES 2014: Pro Evolution Soccer	Konami	October 4, 2013	September 20, 2013	September 24, 2013		
PES 2015: Pro Evolution Soccer	Konami	September 13, 2014	September 13, 2014	September 11, 2014		
PES 2016: Pro Evolution Soccer	Konami	October 1, 2015	September 17, 2015	September 15, 2015		
PES 2016: Pro Evolution Soccer myClub	Konami	December 8, 2015	December 8, 2015	December 8, 2015		
PES 2017: Pro Evolution Soccer	Konami	September 15, 2016	September 15, 2016	September 13, 2016		
PES 2018: Pro Evolution Soccer	Konami	September 13, 2017	September 15, 2017	September 12, 2017		
Pro Foosball	Quirkat	Unreleased	February 20, 2013	October 1, 2013		
Professional Baseball Spirits 4	Konami	May 1, 2007	Unreleased	Unreleased		
Professional Baseball Spirits 5	Konami	May 1, 2008	Unreleased	Unreleased		
Professional Baseball Spirits 6	Konami	July 16, 2009	Unreleased	Unreleased		
Professional Baseball Spirits 2010	Konami	April 1, 2010	Unreleased	Unreleased		
Professional Baseball Spirits 2011	Konami	April 14, 2011	Unreleased	Unreleased		
Professional Baseball Spirits 2012	Konami	March 29, 2012	Unreleased	Unreleased		
Professional Baseball Spirits 2013	Konami	March 20, 2013	Unreleased	Unreleased		
Professional Baseball Spirits 2014	Konami	March 20, 2014	Unreleased	Unreleased		
Professional Baseball Spirits 2015	Konami	March 26, 2015	Unreleased	Unreleased		
Proteus	Ed Key & David Kanaga	Unreleased	October 30, 2013	October 29, 2013		
Prototype	Radical Entertainment	Unreleased	June 12, 2009	June 9, 2009		
Prototype 2	Radical Entertainment	Unreleased	April 24, 2012	April 24, 2012		
Psych Yourself	Creat Studios	Unreleased	March 13, 2013	March 12, 2013		
Puddle	Neko Entertainment	Unreleased	January 25, 2012	January 31, 2012		
Pumped BMX +	Curve Digital	Unreleased	Unreleased	September 22, 2015		
Puppeteer	Japan Studio	September 5, 2013	September 11, 2013	September 10, 2013	3D M	
Pure	Black Rock Studios	June 25, 2009	September 26, 2008	September 16, 2008		
Pure Chess	VooFoo Studios	Unreleased	April 11, 2012	May 29, 2012		
Pure Football	Ubisoft Vancouver	May 27, 2010	May 28, 2010	June 1, 2010		
Puss in Boots	Blitz Games	Unreleased	December 2, 2011	October 25, 2011	M	
Putty Squad	System 3	Unreleased	November 29, 2013	Unreleased		
Puyo Puyo Tetris	Sega	February 6, 2014	Unreleased	Unreleased		
Puzzle Agent	Telltale Games	Unreleased	June 2, 2011	April 19, 2011		
Puzzle Chronicles	Infinite Interactive	Unreleased	April 29, 2010	April 22, 2010		
Puzzle Dimension	Doctor Entertainment	Unreleased	June 29, 2011	June 28, 2011	3D	
Puzzle Quest: Challenge of the Warlords – Revenge of the Plague Lord	Infinite Interactive	October 1, 2009	December 11, 2008	October 9, 2008		
Puzzle Quest: Galactrix	Infinite Interactive	October 1, 2009	June 11, 2009	May 7, 2009		
Puzzlegeddon	Pieces Interactive	Unreleased	June 23, 2010	December 17, 2009		

== Bundles and Game Versions ==
Title	Developer(s)	Release date			Options	Ref.
Title	Developer(s)	JP	PAL	NA	Options	Ref.
Jak and Daxter Collection Remastered in HD	Mass Media	Unreleased	February 22, 2012	February 7, 2012		
Killzone Trilogy	Guerrilla	October 24, 2012	October 24, 2012	October 23, 2012		
Metal Gear Solid HD Edition (Metal Gear, Metal Gear 2, Metal Gear Solid)	Kojima Productions	November 23, 2011	August 21, 2012	August 21, 2012		
Metal Gear Solid: The Legacy Collection (Metal Gear Solid, Metal Gear Solid: VR Missions)	Kojima Productions	July 11, 2013	September 13, 2013	July 9, 2013		
