= GTI Club+: Rally Côte d'Azur =

2008 video game

- PlayStation Store icon
- Developer: Sumo Digital
- Publisher: Konami
- Series: GTI Club
- Platform: PlayStation 3
- Release: EU: 4 December 2008; NA: 15 January 2009; JP: 25 February 2010
- Genre: Racing
- Modes: Single-player, multiplayer

GTI Club+: Rally Côte d'Azur is a racing video game developed by Sumo Digital and published by Konami for the PlayStation 3. The game itself is a remake of the original GTI Club arcade game released in 1996.

GTI Club+ was released through the European PlayStation Store on 4 December 2008, and the North American Store on 15 January 2009, and the Japan Store on 25 February 2010. As of 2012, it is no longer available for purchase due to license expiration.

== Production ==
A first trailer was unveiled at the Leipzig Game Convention 2008. The video was followed by a playable demo on 27 November.

This enhanced version is rendered in 720p and runs at 60fps. It supports Dolby Digital 5.1 surround sound and the original BGM has been remixed by Atjazz.

== Features ==
Compared to the original arcade version, GTI Club+ added a solo mode, an eight-player online multiplayer mode (Race and Time Bomb modes) instead of four-player, and an online rankings leaderboard. The game also featured voice chat via the Bluetooth headset and support for the PlayStation Eye, the latter of which allowed players to see themselves during playtime. Other supported features were motion sensor steering through Sixaxis, rumble through DualShock 3 and PlayStation Network Trophies feature. In addition, GTI Club+ included some content from GTI Club: Supermini Festa!, which was released roughly the same month, though the graphic itself stayed faithful to the original 1996 arcade game.

== Cars & tracks ==
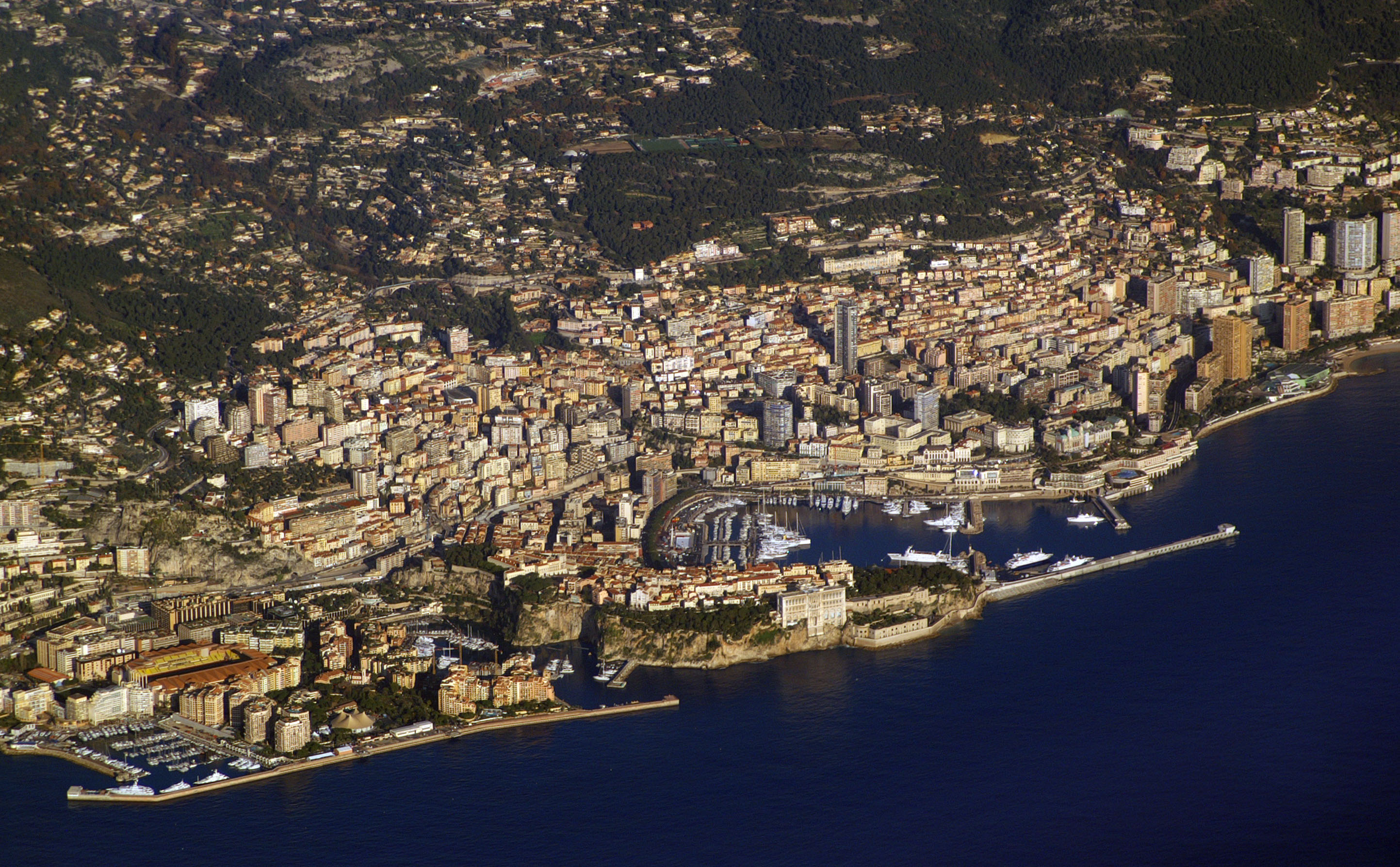
The Rally Côte d'Azur is predominantly based on Monaco.

The game was designed around the first ever GTI Club arcade game, therefore there was only one course available, the eponymous Rally Côte d'Azur. This was in contrast to the GTI Club: Supermini Festa! arcade game, which featured four courses, with the Rally Côte d'Azur referred to as the France Course.

The Rally Côte d'Azur consisted of fictitious urban and harbour areas located in the Côte d'Azur, also known as the French Riviera. Road signs clearly hinted at Monaco's Monte Carlo (Musée océanographique, parking Louis II, parking Square Gastaud) with references to nearby French cities of Menton (Port Garavan), Antibes, Digne and Nice.

Solo mode consisted of four circuits named Easy, Medium, Hard and Free Run. Easy was 3-lap course within a small area. Medium added traffic and new sections to the Easy course. Hard was a 5-lap reverse version of the Medium course. Free Run was a traffic-free Time Attack version of Medium course.

There were a total of five playable cars in the game, all of which were taken from Supermini Festa!. In addition to the Lancia Delta HF 4WD, the original 1996 arcade game's four licensed classic European superminis were included, namely the Morris Mini Cooper 1275S (Mk1), Renault 5 Alpine Turbo (A5/R122B), Volkswagen Golf GTi (Mk1) and Autobianchi A112 Abarth.

The customization feature allowed players to customize their cars with a selection of colors, paint jobs, stickers and decals, as well as horns. Alternative car versions were unlockable by winning races. Easy difficulty unlocked a Police colour scheme for the car the race was won in, with the scheme reminiscent of the livery of the police force of the country the car was made in (i.e. "Police", "Polizia" or "Polizei", though the Renault had a "Polizia" livery instead of the French "Police" for some reasons). Medium difficulty unlocked Taxi colour schemes for the cars. These Police and Taxi versions could not be customized.

A secret unlockable vehicle called Toy Dog was unlocked when beating the Hard difficulty. This special racer was simply a German Shepherd-shaped wooden rocking dog.

== Downloadable content ==
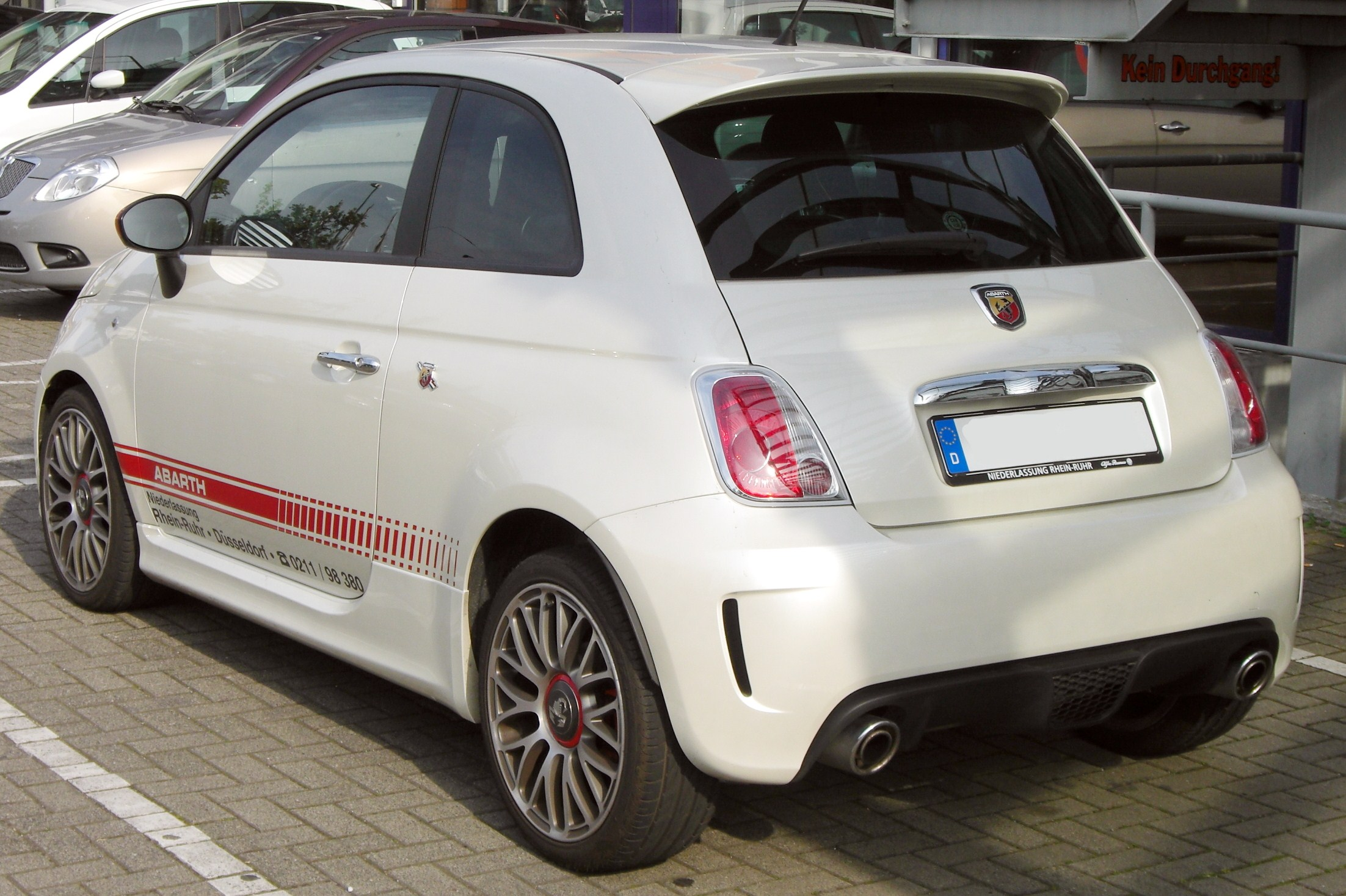
The Fiat 500 Abarth was available through DLC.

The first set of DLC entitled 'Car Pack 1' was released on 4 June 2009, adding four cars taken from GTI Club Supermini Festa!. These were the Fiat 500 Abarth, BMW Mini Cooper S (MkII), Peugeot 207 GTi (with a Supermini Festa! sticker) and Volkswagen Polo GTI (Mk5) with their respective Police and Taxi versions as in the arcade game. This DLC pack also included ten PSN Trophies.

Further additional cars were to be available as hinted by the empty car slots found in the in-game Garage. By the time the game was discontinued however, these cars remain unreleased. The cars in question appeared to be the remaining three from Supermini Festa!, i.e. Volkswagen Golf GTI 16v (Mk2), Fiat 500 Abarth 695SS and Nissan Micra (K12C).

== Reception ==
Reception

Aggregate score
Aggregator	Score
Metacritic	70/100

Review scores
Publication	Score
Edge	6/10
Eurogamer	7/10
GamesMaster	69%
GameSpot	7/10
GamesTM	7/10
IGN	(UK) 8/10 (US) 7/10
PlayStation Official Magazine – UK	6/10
Play	72%
PSM3	77%
VideoGamer.com	7/10

The game received "mixed or average reviews" according to the review aggregation website Metacritic.
