= The Trials of Topoq =

2007 video game

- Developer(s): London Studio
- Publisher(s): Sony Computer Entertainment
- Designer(s): Ron Festejo
- Series: PlayStation Eye
- Platform(s): PlayStation 3
- Release: EU: 25 October 2007; NA: 20 December 2007
- Genre(s): Puzzle
- Mode(s): Single-player

The Trials of Topoq is a 2007 puzzle video game developed by London Studio and published by Sony Computer Entertainment for the PlayStation 3. It utilizes the PlayStation Eye camera peripheral. It was released on the PlayStation Store.

== Gameplay ==
The game requires the PlayStation Eye to boot as the camera is not only used to maneuver the ball, but also to navigate through the game's menus where the player moves his own hands instead of using a gamepad. The PlayStation Eye's focale must be set to match the standard field of view (Red)

The main purpose of these trials is to guide an orb through five towers, known as City I (very easy), City II (easy), City III (intermediate), City IV (hard) and City V (very hard). With the help of his body and hands the player creates slopes in order to make roll the orb to hit the mystical cages of energy and avoid gargoyles. The player's image is captured by the camera and mapped on the tower's mosaic-like surface that make up each course. Each player motions rise up the tiles which forms slopes across the surface, these slopes are used to control the direction of the orb.

There are four styles of trials: Trial of Value, Trial of Caution, Trial of Speed, and Trial of Control.

== Reception ==
Reception

Aggregate scores
| Aggregator | Score |
|---|---|
| GameRankings | 64.00% |
| Metacritic | 62/100 |

Review score
| Publication | Score |
|---|---|
| IGN | 7.3/10 |

The Trials of Topoq received mixed reviews from critics upon release. On Metacritic, the game holds a score of 62/100 based on 6 reviews, indicating "mixed or average reviews". On GameRankings, the game holds a score of 64.00% based on 7 reviews.
