= Snakeball =

2007 video game

- PlayStation Store icon
- Developer(s): Gamoola Soft; Ravn Studio
- Publisher(s): Sony Computer Entertainment
- Producer(s): Tinka Town
- Designer(s): Duncan McIntosh
- Platform(s): PlayStation 3
- Release: NA: 20 November 2007; JP: 7 February 2008; PAL: 21 February 2008
- Genre(s): Action
- Mode(s): Single player, multiplayer

Snakeball is a party video game developed by Gamoola Soft and Ravn Studio and published by Sony Computer Entertainment for the PlayStation 3. It was released on the PlayStation Store. It is a 3D variant of the "Snake" concept. Main developer Gamoola Soft was a short-lived game development arm of British animation studio Gamoola.

== Gameplay ==
The game uses most of the mechanics of the late 1970s game Snake. The goal consists of taking the balls and throwing them into the hole at the center of the stage. While the game has many variations of gameplay, the main goal stays the same.

Snakeball has a flashy disco graphic style, with stages that are taking places on disco floors. The player can also choose between 16 characters with 8 colors each. The PlayStation Eye camera can be used to snap a picture of the player's face and map it onto one of the riders.

== Modes ==
Snakeball has three main game modes: Snakeball, Challenge and Ball Frenzy. Snakeball is the multiplayer mode, where up to eight players can play online. There are 10 variations of game for this mode:

- Raindrops: The player has to collect the balls as they appear and shoot them in the goal.
- Patience: Similar to Raindrops, but here, the balls do not appear immediately.
- Goal Fever: Similar to Raindrops, but every ball must be put into the goal of matching color.
- The Ball Ring: Similar to Raindrops, but only with bomb balls that explodes after 10 seconds.
- Open Season: At the beginning, the balls are launched and do not stop moving. Also, there are now enemies that the player must avoid.
- Bumper Jam: In this game variation, balls can only be shot at goal.
- Square Routes: Similar to Raindrops, but taking places in a maze of squares bumpers.
- Goal Tangle: The player can score balls in goals for shots and normal goals in a stage filled with enemies.
- Trigger Snappy: Similar to Open Season, but the enemies here are far more. Fortunately, the player can now eliminate them with guns.
- No balls: The player has no balls to score. The goal of the game is to destroy the ships of other players with guns.

The second game mode is Challenge, where the player must navigate through levels to open the teleporter and go to the next level. 14 levels are available. The last one is Ball Frenzy, which is a remake of the classic game Snake, with 10 levels. The goal of this mode is to get all the 1000 balls that are in the level without crashing and destroying the ship.

An additional mode, Team Mode was released on the PlayStation Store as downloadable content in May 2008. It includes team-based online and offline multiplayer matches up to 8 players.

== Reception ==
Reception

Aggregate score
Aggregator	Score
Metacritic	65/100

Review scores
Publication	Score
Eurogamer	7/10
IGN	8/10
PlayStation Official Magazine – UK	5/10
Play	57%
PSM3	54%

The game received "mixed" reviews according to the review aggregation website Metacritic.

== See also ==
- PlayStation Eye
- Snake (video game)
