= The Eye of Judgment =

2007 video game

- Developer: Japan Studio
- Publisher: Sony Computer Entertainment
- Platform: PlayStation 3
- Release: Set 1: NA: October 23, 2007; JP: October 25, 2007; EU: October 26, 2007; AU: October 25, 2007; Set 2: JP: March 27, 2008; EU: March 27, 2008; NA: April 24, 2008; Set 3: WW: October 16, 2008; CAN: November 10, 2008
- Genre: Collectible card game
- Modes: Single-player, multiplayer

The Eye of Judgment is a digital collectible card video game developed and published by Sony Computer Entertainment for the PlayStation 3. It is the first game to utilize the PlayStation Eye camera peripheral, with which it was available in a bundle in Japan, Europe, the Middle East, and North America. Once planned for release close to the PlayStation 3 launch in November 2006, the game was eventually released on October 25, 2007, as Set 1 in Japan.

Two expansion packs have been released for the game in 2008. Set 2 was released on PlayStation Network on March 27 in Europe and Japan (April 24 in North America), with additional enhancements such as improved graphic displays, a new ability and honor ranking system, an in-game encyclopedia, and special matches. Japan, United States and Europe have seen the release of Set 3 on PlayStation Network on October 16, with Canada on November 10. A "complete disc" of The Eye of Judgment with Sets 1–3 was also planned for release in stores in 2008, but was later canceled.

In 2010, a spin-off called The Eye of Judgment: Legends was released for the PlayStation Portable.

== Gameplay ==
Through use of an included "9 Fields" table mat featuring 3x3 rectangular grid, and special trading cards encoded with CyberCode matrix code, players conquer a playfield by employing various creatures and spells, taking turns playing cards of their choice strategically on the mat, and performing actions through gestures that are captured through the PlayStation Eye camera, which is mounted on a special stand (also included with the game). The first player to occupy five spaces (more than half the field) wins the match.

On each turn, players can move a card, changing its position and/or orientation. The cards are divided into two main classes: creature cards and spell cards. When a creature card is placed face-up on the grid, the creature is "summoned", and displayed perched on top of the field. Creatures have different offensive and defensive levels depending on their orientation on the field, and are more vulnerable to attacks from the side or behind. During an attack, the view switches from the field view to a "battle mode", in which the two battling creatures are shown battling. Spell cards can be used to attack other creatures, or claim or cause an effect on a space.

Each of the nine fields, as well as most cards, are categorized by one of five elements. The elements are fire, water, earth, wood, and Biolith. Fire and water are opposing elements, as are earth and wood. Creatures played on a field that corresponds to their element, such as a fire creature on a fire field, get an automatic bonus of +2 points to life, making them significantly tougher to kill. Creatures played on a field of their opposite element automatically lose 2 points of life, giving them a serious disadvantage. In fact, if a creature with 2 life points or less is played on its opposite element, it immediately dies. Biolith cards are neutral, and gain no bonus or penalty to life by being placed on any field. Each of the nine fields has a second element associated with it. This element is partially revealed on the edge of the field. That second element becomes active when certain cards cause the field to be "flipped". The original element then becomes inactive. In the default/official field configuration, the center field is always Biolith, and the other elements are in a set pattern such that each element has a corner field and a middle-edge field. The field can also be set to random or other unofficial configurations in casual (un-ranked) games.

Most actions in the game cost "mana". This includes summoning creatures, casting spells, attacking, and rotating a friendly creature that is in play. At the beginning of each player's turn, they gain 2 points of mana. If a creature is killed, it is moved to the discard pile and its owner gains 1 point of mana. There are other cards in the game that allow a player to gain mana in various ways.

== Features ==
The game features a profile mode in which players can hold cards in front of the camera and view their profiles; with information on health points, attack points, and special abilities and effects. In this mode, players can interact with the creatures, with the creature performing an attack action when poked. The game also features a simplistic "Rock, Paper, Scissors"-style mode for younger players.

Set 1 is bundled with a playing mat, the stand for holding the PlayStation Eye, a starter pack consisting of 30 summoning cards and 4 function cards, and an eight-card booster pack. All starter packs contain the same selection of cards, while booster packs consist of random summoning cards. Booster packs and pre-constructed theme decks are available for purchase separately by Wizards of the Coast. There are approximately 100 unique card types in each set, with 110 in Set 1, a further 100 in Set 2 and 101 in Set 3 (although only 100 of the Set 3 cards are playable 'in game', with card 311 being a promotional card only.

Two-player competitive matches could be played online. As a prohibitive measure against cheating the card draw, players' summoning decks were registered and saved by the game. In online matches, the random draw was handled virtually using the registered deck data. The cards were then played as normal. To prevent registering the same card multiple times as different copies, duplicate cards were to be presented simultaneously when registering. In response to questions regarding possible counterfeiting of cards, marketing director Christy Newton stated at the time that measures were incorporated in the recognition technology and in the printing of the cards to prevent color photocopies from being usable. Despite this, success has been reported using standard photocopies and hand-drawn copies.

== Development ==
When asked in an interview at E3 2006, Eye of Judgment producers Kazuhito Miyaki and Yusuke Watanabe answered that the game had been in development for three years; of which the previous year had been focused on graphics development, and the two years before that were spent developing the gameplay mechanics on paper. The developers elaborated that technological tests were conducted at the start of the development, and that one of the main areas of development was currently getting the game to properly recognize the cards on the play mat.

Regarding the implementation of the CyberCode matrix code, Miyaki said in a 2007 interview that working with the technology was challenging, noting that it started at Sony Computer Science Laboratories, featuring a more complicated barcode system where the initial implementation used "two supercomputers and high vision cameras", and wasn't practical for home game machines. According to Miyaki: "It had a whole mile to go, and to get from there to now has been very difficult".

In August 2006, an official teaser site indicated that the name contained the subtitle, Conquerors of 9 Fields. The game has since been given a new subtitle, Biolith Rebellion, in Japan.

Online support for the game was discontinued on September 30, 2010.

A spin-off for the PlayStation Portable titled The Eye of Judgement: Legends was released in 2010. While it does not utilize the PlayStation Portable's camera attachment, hence not able to be played with physical cards, it otherwise is identical in terms of gameplay.

== Reception ==
The Eye of Judgment received "generally favorable" reviews, according to review aggregator Metacritic.

Reception

Aggregate score
Aggregator	Score
Metacritic	75/100

Review scores
Publication	Score
Eurogamer	7/10
GameSpot	7.5/10
IGN	8/10

== Notes ==
a: Each booster pack consists of 5 Common cards, 2 Uncommon cards and 1 Rare or Ultra Rare card. In some cases the Ultra Rare card is a Phantom card which contains no text, featuring only the barcode and face positioning. Individual booster packs are sold for US$3.99 in the United States.
b: Each set has an accompanying selection of 5 different theme decks, each fully playable by itself, with a pre-set 30 Summoning Cards (spells and creatures) plus four Function Cards that allow players to put the controller away when playing. The theme decks for Set 1 are Wood Swarm, Fire Crusader, Water Barrage, Earth Emperor, and Biolith Scourge. Set 2's theme decks are Wood Unleashed, Water Conquest, Fire King's Rage, Earth Atonement, and Biolith Godmaker. Each theme deck comes with a Summoner's Companion, a 32-page book containing tactical hints, card lists, images and stories from The Eye of Judgment. In the United States, theme decks retail at US$14.99 each.
