= Star Trek DAC =

2009 video game

- Developers: Naked Sky Entertainment, Bad Robot Interactive
- Publisher: Paramount Digital Entertainment (Note: OS X version developed and published by TransGaming.)
- Platforms: Xbox 360, PlayStation 3, Microsoft Windows, Mac OS X
- Release: Xbox 360; May 13, 2009; Windows, PlayStation 3: NA: November 12, 2009; EU: December 17, 2009 (PS3); OS X December 21, 2009
- Genre: Shooter
- Modes: Single-player, multiplayer

Star Trek D·A·C (Deathmatch. Assault. Conquest) is a video game inspired by the 2009 Star Trek movie, developed by Naked Sky Entertainment in collaboration with Bad Robot. The title is derived from the game's three modes of play: Deathmatch, Assault, and Conquest. The game was released for the Xbox 360 via the Xbox Live Arcade on May 13, 2009, for the PlayStation 3 (via the PlayStation Network) and Microsoft Windows in November 2009, and for Mac OS X (Intel only) on December 21, 2009.

== Gameplay ==
The game was officially announced at the 2009 Game Developers Conference. D-A-C stands for the three modes of play available in the game: Deathmatch, Assault, and Conquest. The game is arcade-focused with the title being delivered without a narrative.

It is an online multiplayer with up to 12 players in two teams of 6 and supports 6 unique levels across 3 game modes including a Survival challenge mode (single-player campaign). The game's levels feature different objectives, and each level has been designed to have a completion time of ten minutes. It supports cooperative gameplay in which up to 6 players battle against 6 A.I controlled bots. It plays Federation versus Romulan factions. It uses the USS Enterprise model from the 2009 film, plus 9 other ships. Players are able to upgrade their ships during play by collecting various power-ups (each faction has 4 unique special weapons as well).

The PC version was pre-optimized to run in stereoscopic 3D on NVIDIA GeForce 3D Vision. DDD and iZ3D pre-optimization was arranged by the S-3D Gaming Alliance. In addition, the PC version has some GPU accelerated PhysX effects.

== Reception ==
Reception

Aggregate score
Aggregator	Score		
Aggregator	PC	PS3	Xbox 360
Metacritic	50/100	62/100	53/100

Review scores
Publication	Score		
Publication	PC	PS3	Xbox 360
1Up.com	N/A	N/A	C
Destructoid	N/A	N/A	3/10
GamePro	N/A	N/A	3.5/5
GameSpot	5/10	5/10	4/10
Giant Bomb	N/A	N/A	2/5
IGN	7/10	7/10	6.1/10
PlayStation Official Magazine – UK	N/A	6/10	N/A
Official Xbox Magazine (US)	N/A	N/A	7/10
PC Gamer (UK)	41%	N/A	N/A
PC PowerPlay	5/10	N/A	N/A
411Mania	N/A	N/A	7.6/10
Teletext GameCentral	N/A	N/A	3/10

The game received "mixed" reviews on all platforms according to the review aggregation website Metacritic. IGN's Hilary Goldstein and Daemon Hatfield pointed out in their review of the PC and PlayStation 3 versions:

Star Trek D-A-C definitely benefits from the inclusion of the single-player Survival mode. The multiplayer modes were all that were available when the game was first released on XBLA earlier this year, and the package feels more robust now. Also, whereas we previously couldn't tweak game settings, we now can customize multiplayer matches. It's very cool that the developers listened to feedback from the first release and actually improved the game. Originally this was something you could have a few hours of fun with. Now, we reckon you can extend those fun times to a few days.

— Hilary Goldstein and Daemon Hatfield, IGN

In 2016, Den of Geek ranked Star Trek DAC as one of the worst Star Trek games.
