= GTI Club =

Arcade racing game series that started in 1996

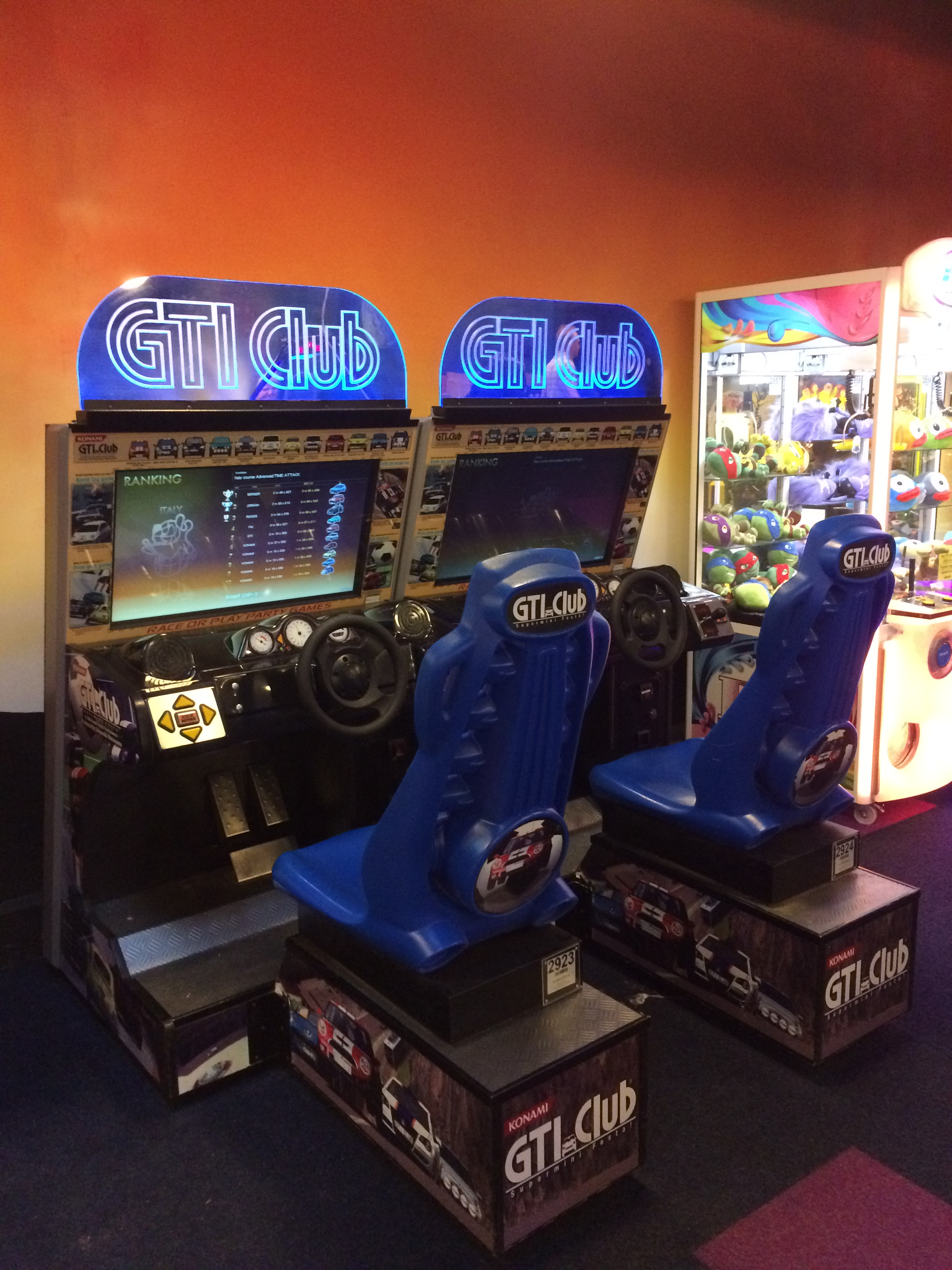
Konami GTI Club

GTI Club is a racing game originally released for the arcades in 1996 by Konami, on their new Cobra arcade board, which uses PowerPC-based hardware. In the original, the player raced around the Côte d'Azur and could choose from 5 rally cars including a Mini Cooper and Renault 5 Alpine Turbo. The game allowed free-roaming of the environment, which was revolutionary for the time, and contained several semi-hidden shortcuts that could be used to reduce lap times. A handbrake is provided which the player is encouraged to use to perform handbrake turns round sharp corners.

== Series ==
=== GTI Club: Corso Italiano (Arcade, July 2000) ===
The first sequel (GTIクラブ・コルソイタリアーノ) released in 2000, it was published overseas in 2001 as GTI Club 2 and Driving Party. The action moves from France to Italy with Town (Easy), Coast (Medium) and Mountain (Hard) courses, hence the title. It features eight unlicensed cars resembling the likes of Morris Mini and Bugatti EB110 plus a selection of new cars including the Fiat 500, Lotus Seven, AC Cobra, Volkswagen Beetle, Nissan Fairlady Z (S30) and Alfa Romeo Giulia.

=== GTI Club: Supermini Festa! (Arcade, December 2008) ===
In December 2008, Konami released Supermini Festa! in Japan and 2009 worldwide with the original "France Course" and "Italy Course" plus two additional circuits (England and U.S.A.) and twelve cars.

GTI Club ワールドシティレース (lit. "GTI Club: World City Race"), which adds a "Japan Course", was later released for the Wii on 25 February 2010 in Japan, and under the original name on 16 March in North America and 25 March in Europe. The PlayStation Portable version was released simultaneously in Japan but was delayed to 22 April 2010 in North America, and was not released physically in Europe.

European supply of the Wii game was reportedly affected by the Icelandic volcano eruption.

=== GTI Club+: Rally Côte d'Azur (PlayStation 3, December 2008) ===
GTI Club+: Rally Côte d'Azur, an HD port of original GTI Club, was released for the PlayStation Network (2008 in Europe, 2009 in United States). The port was developed by British studio Sumo Digital and published by Konami. The game featured a number of improvements over the original game, including enhanced graphics and sound, eight player online multiplayer, new modes and compatibility with the PlayStation Eye. As of 2012, it is no longer available for purchase due to license expiration.

== Arcade hardware description ==
- 3D DSP: ADSP-21062 (SHARC) @ 36 MHz
- Sound CPU: 68EC000 @ 16 MHz
- Sound chips: Ricoh RF5C400 PCM 32Ch, 44.4 kHz Stereo, 3D Effect Spatializer.
- Graphics (Custom 3D): 2 x KS10071 (Possibly graphics as well: KS10081, K001604)
- Unknown Chips (possibly sound related): K056800, K056230
