= Monster Hunter Frontier Z =

2007 video game

- Xbox 360 cover
- Developer: Capcom
- Publisher: Capcom
- Series: Monster Hunter
- Platforms: Microsoft Windows, Xbox 360
- Release: Windows: JP: June 21, 2007; Xbox 360: JP: June 24, 2010
- Genre: Action role-playing
- Mode: Multiplayer

Monster Hunter Frontier Online (モンスターハンター フロンティア オンライン, Monsutāhantā Furontia Onrain), later renamed Monster Hunter Frontier Z, is a discontinued massively multiplayer online role-playing game (MMORPG) for Microsoft Windows, the first spin-off in the Monster Hunter franchise to appear on the platform. Monster Hunter Frontier was released on the Xbox 360 in Japan on June 24, 2010, where it sold 93,000 copies during its initial launch week. It was continually updated through expansion packs known as Seasons and Forwards, which introduced new locations, armor sets, and new monsters. All Monster Hunter Frontier online services ended on December 18, 2019.

== Development ==
Capcom announced in February 2010 that the game would be ported to the Xbox 360 with a subsequent release on June 24, 2010. There were rumors of a western release, but these speculations never materialized.

In an attempt to reach a wider audience across multiple gaming platforms, a variety of presets were made available to customize the overall game experience. "Heavy mode" presented the game with the highest graphics and audio settings, "Medium" presented the game in middle-range settings, and "Low" presented the game with the minimum settings necessary to run.

Capcom made use of nProtect GameGuard to combat cheating efforts in the online environment. In early 2013, an expansion called Monster Hunter Frontier G was confirmed for all platforms, which would serve as a major update to the Frontier service. The title was added to the PlayStation 3, Wii U, and PlayStation Vita later that year.
