= GTI Club: Rally Côte d'Azur =

1996 racing video game

- Developer: Konami
- Publisher: Konami
- Series: GTI Club
- Platform: Arcade
- Release: JP: September 12, 1996; WW: 1996
- Genre: Racing
- Modes: Single-player, multiplayer
- Arcade system: Konami Scorpion

GTI Club: Rally Côte d'Azur is a racing video game developed and published by Konami for the arcades in 1996. It is the first game in the GTI Club series. It was re-released for PlayStation Network in 2008.

== Gameplay ==
GTI Club: Rally Côte d'Azur is a game that gives players a choice of eight cars including the VW Golf GTI, Renault 5, and Mini Cooper, and the course winds through a European city. It is a street racing game with non-linear maps, allowing players to take shortcuts through alternative routes such as tunnels and back alleys.

== Development and release ==
The first GTI Club game was released for the arcades in 1996 by Konami, on their new Cobra arcade board. Three models were released: a deluxe single-player cabinet, a dual-player sitdown cabinet, and then a single-player sitdown cabinet. In the United States, the deluxe model cabinets were released in limited numbers.

== Reception ==
The game was a hit in arcades. In Japan, Game Machine listed GTI Club: Rally Côte d'Azur on their February 1, 1997 issue as being the third most-successful dedicated arcade game of the month.

Next Generation gave it four stars out of five and called it a "sufficiently immersive" one-player game. Hyper magazine also rated it 4 out of 5 stars.

== Reviews ==
- Console Plus
- Playmania
- Player One
