= Operation Creature Feature =

2007 video game

- United Kingdom digital artwork
- Developers: London Studio; Playlogic Entertainment
- Publisher: Sony Computer Entertainment
- Series: PlayStation Eye
- Engine: Havok
- Platform: PlayStation 3
- Release: EU: 25 October 2007; NA: 20 November 2007
- Genre: Puzzle
- Mode: Single-player

Operation Creature Feature is a 2007 puzzle video game developed by London Studio and Playlogic Entertainment and published by Sony Computer Entertainment for the PlayStation 3. It utilizes the PlayStation Eye camera peripheral. Announced at Tokyo Game Show in 2007, It was released on the European PlayStation Store on 25 October 2007 and appeared on the North American PlayStation Store on 20 November 2007.

== Gameplay ==
In this unique PlayStation Eye puzzler title, players must help the Blurbs find their way to safety. Players use their hands to grab and direct the different Blurb characters around each stage's challenges. Hand motions are used to coax or push them about as they guide them towards the goal.

== Reception ==
Ryan Clements of IGN praised the game for its innovative gameplay and cheap price, but noted that the imbalance of gameplay elements and its short length to be detrimental.

== See also ==
- PlayStation Eye
- Tori-Emaki
