= Twister Mania =

2011 video game

- North American box art
- Developer: Naked Sky Entertainment
- Publishers: NA: Majesco; EU: 505 Games
- Platform: Xbox 360
- Release: NA: November 1, 2011; EU: November 25, 2011
- Genre: Video board game
- Modes: Single player, multiplayer

Twister Mania launched in November 2011 for the Microsoft Kinect for Xbox 360 video game console as a digital version of the Twister board game.

Developed by Naked Sky Entertainment, Twister Mania is published by Majesco and is rated E for Everyone by the Entertainment Software Rating Board.

== Reception ==
Reviews of Twister Mania by its target audience are generally favorable. The game has been called out by Family Friendly Gaming as one of the most family friendly games of 2011, with a score of 96, where it was praised for both its fun gameplay and innovative UI. The UI is similarly called out in other reviews.
