= John Daly's ProStroke Golf =

2010 video game

- Cover art featuring golfer John Daly
- Developer: Gusto Games
- Publisher: O-Games
- Platforms: Microsoft Windows, PlayStation 3, Xbox 360
- Release: October 5, 2010: Windows; NA: January 25, 2011; UK: November 5, 2010 PlayStation 3; NA: October 5, 2010; PAL: October 15, 2010 Xbox 360; PAL: November 5, 2010
- Genre: Sports
- Modes: Single-player; Multiplayer

John Daly's ProStroke Golf is a 2010 sports video game developed by Gusto Games and published by O-Games. It is a spiritual successor to ProStroke Golf: World Tour 2007. It features golfer John Daly, and was released for Microsoft Windows, PlayStation 3, and Xbox 360. The PS3 version is the first golf game to have immediate compatibility with the PlayStation Move controller; Tiger Woods PGA Tour 11, released earlier in 2010, became compatible after its debut with the use of a patch. The Xbox 360 version was supposed to be released in North America on October 19, 2010, but was ultimately canceled. John Daly's ProStroke Golf received mixed reviews.

== Gameplay ==
John Daly's ProStroke Golf has 12 courses from around the world, including the Brabazon at the Belfry, Harpers Lake, The Shire, and Dale Hill. It features three game modes, including Career mode, in which the player takes on golfer John Daly in a competition across each course, seeking to perform certain golf moves such as longest drive. The player must finish these challenges to unlock tournaments at each course. Other modes include Quick Game and an online multiplayer option. The game also includes golf commentary from Sam Torrance and Peter Kessler.

The game features the return of the first-person ProStroke mode, previously used in ProStroke Golf: World Tour 2007. John Daly's ProStroke Golf is compatible with the PlayStation Move motion controller, with the player using it as if it were a golf club. The game can be played in its entirety using only the Move, but is also compatible with the standard PlayStation 3 controller.

== Reception ==
Reception

Aggregate score
Aggregator	Score
Metacritic	(PS3) 58/100 (X360) 57/100

Review scores
Publication	Score
Game Informer	(PS3) 7.5/10
GamesMaster	(PS3) 54%
GameSpot	(PS3) 6/10
GameZone	(PS3) 4.5/10
IGN	(PS3) 5.5/10
Jeuxvideo.com	(PS3) 9/20
Official Xbox Magazine (US)	(X360) 4.5/10
PALGN	(PS3) 5/10
PlayStation: The Official Magazine	(PS3) 7/10
Push Square	(PS3) 7/10
411Mania	6/10

John Daly's ProStroke Golf received "mixed or average" reviews, according to the review aggregation website Metacritic. Official Xbox Magazine gave the Xbox 360 version a negative review while it was still in development in the U.S.

Brett Todd of GameSpot wrote that it "looks like a budget title despite a full sticker price, with a scarcity of options, a fair number of quirks, and pixelly PlayStation 2-era graphics. This isn't so much a full-featured golf game as it is a stripped-down tech demo". Critics praised the accuracy of the Move controls, generally viewing this as the sole highlight of the game. Several critics considered Tiger Woods PGA Tour 11 to be superior.

Reviews criticized the Career mode for its difficulty, as well as its minimal resemblance to a typical career mode. The visuals received criticism as well. GameZone's Robert Workman wrote that the graphics "aren't horrible by any means", although he found them inferior to recent games in the Tiger Woods series, stating, "There are too many instances when the visuals look unfinished, leaving both the golfers and the courses looking unimpressive". Nate Ahearn of IGN wrote, "None of the texture work is very impressive and the courses are all relatively lifeless". James Newton of Push Square was critical of "stilted animation, poor texturing and generally mediocre graphics" throughout the game.

Criticism also went to Daly's appearance, with Ahearn stating that he "looks like a pre-pubescent, chubby blonde kid rather than a golf superstar". Todd found that Daly looked more like "a portly, middle-aged Dennis the Menace with a bowl haircut rather than the imposing guy that he still is on the tees in real life". Some critics also noted glitches, such as disappearing balls and camera errors.
