= Ravn Studio =

Norwegian video game developer

Ravn Studio AS
- Company type: Video game developer
- Industry: Video games
- Founded: 2002
- Defunct: 2025-07-16
- Headquarters: Drammen, Norway
- Key people: Stine Wærn, Tinka Town
- Number of employees: ca. 20
- Website: http://www.ravnstudio.no/

Ravn Studio AS is an independent game development studio based in Drammen, Norway. It was established in 2002 by Stine Wærn and Tinka Town.

Ravn Studio collaborated with Gamoola Soft on the Snake-remake Snakeball, released in 2007 exclusively for the PS3 (PSN).

Their first gaming project, Englekræsj, an adventure game for children, was released in August 2008. The game received generally positive reviews, notably from Verdens Gang and Aftenposten. Ravn Studio was later sued by Funcom co-founder Ian Neil, who claimed that the characters in the game were based on his designs. The district court ruled in favor of Ravn Studio, and Neil was ordered to pay damages and attorney's fees.

Ravn Studio is currently developing a Nintendo DS game based on Kaptein Sabeltann. They have previously released some of Norway's best selling DS-games like Knerten gifter seg and Flåklypa Grand Prix. These games went to number 1 on the official charts in Norway.

Ravn Studio is the only Norwegian company licensed to develop on all the major gaming platforms; Nintendo Wii and DS, Sony PSP, PlayStation 2 and PlayStation 3, and Xbox 360. In 2007, Ravn Studio was the recipient of the Nordic game program.

Ravn Studio filed for bankruptcy in July 2025.

== Games ==
- Snakeball (PSN) - (Published by Sony)
- Englekræsj (PC) - (Published by Norwegian Game Distribution)
