= Naked Sky Entertainment =

American video game developer

Naked Sky Entertainment was an independent game development studio based in Los Angeles. They are a licensed developer for Microsoft Windows, Xbox 360, PlayStation 3, and iOS.

== Games ==
- RoboBlitz (2006)
- Star Trek DAC (2009)
- MicroBot (2010)
- Twister Mania (2011)
- A Million Minions (2012)
- Aligned (2012)
- Max Axe (2013)
- Scrap Force (2014)
