= Tori-Emaki =

2007 video game

- Developers: London Studio, Playlogic Entertainment
- Publisher: Sony Computer Entertainment
- Designer: Jonathan Alpine
- Series: PlayStation Eye
- Platform: PlayStation 3
- Release: EU: 1 November 2007; NA: 17 January 2008
- Genre: Interactive art
- Mode: Single-player

Tori-Emaki (Japanese for "bird picture scroll") is an interactive art video game developed by London Studio in association with Playlogic Entertainment for the PlayStation 3 platform, which utilizes the PlayStation Eye camera peripheral. It was released on the European PlayStation Store on November 1, 2007 and on the North American PlayStation Store on January 17, 2008.

The player uses hand gestures and whole body movements seen by the PlayStation Eye to direct a flock of birds from location to location within the emakimono, left, right, up or down. Despite its Japanese culture influences, Japan Studio had no involvement in its development.
