= Planet Minigolf =

2010 minigolf video game

- Developer: Zen Studios
- Publisher: Zen Studios
- Platform: PlayStation 3
- Release: 1 June 2010
- Genre: Minigolf
- Modes: Single-player, Multiplayer

Planet Minigolf is a minigolf video game developed and published by Zen Studios for the PlayStation 3. It was originally released on the PlayStation Network on 1 June 2010. It features support for Sony's PlayStation Move control system. The game features four locations and 144 holes to play, and new courses can be created by players. A downloadable content pack entitled Stronghold Island was released on 21 September 2010.

The game were mixed by critics with an average of 68.40% at GameRankings and 66/100 at Metacritic, two aggregate websites. Reviewers generally praised the game's visuals, ability to customize and create new courses, and multiplayer components. They were critical of the game's camera angles, and some reviewers felt that the visuals were inconsistent. As of September 2010 the game has sold over 68,000 copies. That number rose to over 90,000 at the end of 2010.

== Gameplay ==
Planet Minigolf features exotic locales from around the globe.

Planet Minigolf is a minigolf game which features 144 unique holes spread across four worldwide locations; Buccaneer's Hideout, Soho, Polar Station and Ancient Valley, each with four 9-hole courses. They progress in difficulty from Warm-up through Pro, Extreme and finally Wacky. The game can be played as part of a single-player campaign or as part of any weekly online tournaments against players around the world. Local multiplayer is also supported. Planet Minigolf also features a leaderboard which organizes scores by nationality.

Powerup items can sometimes be found on the courses which allow you to control the ball in various ways to improve your score. Keys can be earned which allow players to purchase wardrobe items, various putters, and golf balls for the five playable characters. These are earned by winning single-player tournaments on the various courses. Players can also create their own golf courses and upload them for other players to download similar to LittleBigPlanet. The game also supports the PlayStation Move controller; players swing the controller in a similar fashion to an actual putter. As of December 2010 over 2,300 custom courses are available, with over 37,000 individual holes also available.

== Development ==
On 14 October 2009, Planet Minigolf was announced as a PlayStation 3-exclusive title that would be available via the PlayStation Network. On 29 March 2010 Zen Studios announced that the game would be fully compatible with PlayStation Move, Sony's motion controller for the PlayStation 3. A trailer released 22 April 2010 showcased the ability to customize minigolf courses, which would allow players to create new scenarios in each of the game's locations. It was revealed under Sony's Play, Create, Share banner, which encourages customization and sharing of user-generated content in games.

On 6 May 2010 Zen Studios revealed that the game would make use of the PlayStation 3's ability to upload replays directly to YouTube. Planet Minigolf was released 1 June 2010. The game received a patch which added Move support on 20 September 2010. A downloadable content pack entitled Stronghold Island was released on 21 September 2010. It contains one new location, four new trophies, four new tournaments, 36 new holes, and several new items for players to use in creating new courses.

== Reception ==
Planet Minigolf

Aggregate scores
Aggregator	Score
GameRankings	68/40%
Metacritic	66/100

Review scores
Publication	Score
GameRevolution	B
GameSpot	7.5/10
IGN	6.5/10
Adrenaline Vault	2/5
Kombo	8.0/10

Planet Minigolf was moderately well received by critics. It currently holds a 68.40% at aggregate website GameRankings and 66/100 at fellow aggregate site Metacritic. Initial sales were high, with the game moving more than 40,000 copies during the month of the game's release and 9,000 more the following month. As of September 2010 the game has sold more than 68,000 units. Year-end 2010 sales were reportedly over 90,000, with the game's downloadable content having over 6,000 units sold.

The ability to create custom minigolf courses was widely praised among reviewers. GameSpot's Justin Calvert felt that the course creation tools were easy to use and stated the game "has the potential to keep you playing for weeks and months as more player-created and downloadable content is added." The reviewer from Game Revolution noted that he preferred looking for difficult courses created by players in order to maintain a challenge. He stated players will "have access to literally thousands of different holes to shoot in hundreds of custom courses." The multiplayer component also received generally positive remarks. "Multiplayer modes, community features, and the course editor give you plenty to do" stated IGN's Daemon Hatfield. Justin Calvert of GameSpot also praised the game's ability to upload replays to YouTube.

Critics generally had mixed opinions on Planet Minigolf's visuals, and some cited issues with the game's camera. The reviewer from Game Revolution felt that the game's graphics were "very pretty for a downloadable title". IGN's Daemon Hatfield also felt that the character models were well done, but cited "hiccups" with the camera. Adrenaline Vault reviewer James Dolbeare felt that the graphics were inconsistent. He stated "characters are rendered well, whereas environments are often flat, pixilated, or simply lack detail."

The Stronghold Island downloadable content was moderately received as well, though it sold over 3,300 units in its first month of release.
