= MicroBot =

2010 video game

- Developer: Naked Sky Entertainment
- Publisher: Electronic Arts
- Platforms: Xbox 360 (XBLA), PlayStation 3 (PSN)
- Release: Xbox Live Arcade; December 29, 2010; PlayStation Network: NA: January 4, 2011; PAL: January 5, 2011
- Genre: Shoot 'em up

MicroBot is a twin-stick shooter video game developed by Naked Sky Entertainment and published by Electronic Arts. It was released on the Xbox 360 via Xbox Live Arcade on December 29, 2010, and on PlayStation 3 via the PlayStation Network in 2011. In the game the player controls a MicroBot; a microscopic robot designed to combat infections in the human body. The robot is tasked with destroying previous generation MicroBots which have become corrupted while fighting disease in the body.

Critics were divided on their opinions of the game, but overall review scores were moderate. Most reviewers praised the game's visual and audio presentation. They felt that the environments were convincing as areas of the body and that the soundtrack was strong. Critics differed in opinion about gameplay; many praised the addition of local cooperative play and the ability to upgrade the MicroBot with new weaponry and features, but many felt the game did not add enough new gameplay elements to the genre to keep the player interested long-term.

== Gameplay ==
MicroBot takes place inside a human body. Players control a microscopic robot designed to fight infection.

The game is a twin-stick shooter that takes place within a human body. Fictional medial corporation MicroHexon has developed a line of microscopic robots designed to fight infection inside humans. The player controls a fourth-generation MicroBot, the newest iteration of the series. It is tasked with destroying infections caused by now-corrupted previous generation MicroBots. The game begins with the player character floating inside a hypodermic needle. The MicroBot is then injected into the human body and gameplay begins. The game's levels span across five major areas of the human body with each area consisting of four levels.

The MicroBot can upgrade its weapons to destroy enemies and cure diseases. Weapons can be attached to multiple points on the robot, and each weapon type has different abilities which allows the player to customize their robot as they see fit. Over 20 different weapons can be attached to the robot. Additional attachment slots can be unlocked as players progress. In addition to smaller enemies, the game features five boss battles throughout the campaign. Levels are procedurally generated, meaning that the environment changes somewhat each time the game is played. MicroBot also features a Challenge mode in addition to the main campaign in which players must survive continuous waves of enemies for as long as possible. Local cooperative play for two players is supported. The second player can join or leave the game at any time during gameplay.

== Development ==
MicroBot was unveiled on October 18, 2010, via a press release. It was developed by Naked Sky Entertainment and published by Electronic Arts. It was released on the Xbox 360 via Xbox Live Arcade on December 29, 2010, and on PlayStation 3 via the PlayStation Network in 2011. Glazer cited several titles as inspiration for the game; older twin-stick shooters Robotron and Smash TV, 2003's Geometry Wars, the popular dungeon crawler series Diablo and fellow Electronic Arts title Spore were also cited as inspiration for their elements of customization. During its unveiling critics also cited similarities to the films Osmosis Jones and The Incredible Journey. It also was compared to the games R-Type Final, Einhänder, and Blasteroids. In response Jason Haber of Electronic Arts stated "we hope it invokes a lot of pleasant memories of older games but also creates new ones."

In speaking of the game's setting Haber stated "We wanted to take gamers to a place they have rarely visited before — the world inside the human body. The fluid dynamics of the world and the customization of the MicroBot come together to create a unique take on the arcade shooter genre." Naked Sky Entertainment Chief Technical Officer Joshua Glazer further explained the game's fluid dynamics. "[The game] has a really intense fluid simulation. The fluid isn't just for graphical effect though- you’ll feel it pushing you around as it spurts and spews all over the place."

== Reception ==
Reception

Aggregate score
Aggregator	Score	
Aggregator	PS3	Xbox 360
Metacritic	62/100	60/100

Review scores
Publication	Score	
Publication	PS3	Xbox 360
Edge	4/10	4/10
Eurogamer	8/10	8/10
GameRevolution	B	B
GameSpot	6/10	6/10
GameZone	N/A	5/10
IGN	6.5/10	6.5/10
Joystiq	2/5	N/A
Official Xbox Magazine (UK)	N/A	6/10
PALGN	N/A	4.5/10
PlayStation: The Official Magazine	7/10	N/A

MicroBot received "mixed" reviews on both platforms according to the review aggregation website Metacritic. Ars Technica gave the game a "buy" rating.

Reviewers generally praised the visual and audio design aspects of the game. RunDLC reviewer Chris Buffa praised the visual presentation. "The designers did outstanding work bringing the human body to life, with red blood cells, tissue, veins and bone." Chris Waters of GameSpot also praised the game's visuals. He called them a "vivid imagining of microscopic environments." He noted that the game's setting was convincing due to the visual design and "ethereal, atmospheric" soundtrack. Edge felt that the game made a strong first impression. They called the introduction sequence and soundtrack "high-class presentation". Kristan Reed, reviewer for Eurogamer, stated that players will want to convince their friends to try the game "thanks to the mere beauty of its organic environments." Dakota Grabowski of GameZone called the Xbox 360 version's soundtrack "beautifully creepy."

Critics were divided on their opinions of MicroBot's gameplay mechanics. IGN's Kristine Steimer felt that the levels were sometimes imbalanced, and that boss fights were occasionally "a pain in the ass". Steimer did note that the inclusion of puzzle elements were "refreshing". Edge felt that the game's procedurally generated level design did not deliver the desired effect of randomized gameplay. They stated that "the absence of a human touch is keenly felt." The reviewer did note the welcome addition of local cooperative multiplayer. Watters was more critical of gameplay; he called the action "rarely exciting" and "simplistic". Buffa felt that the gameplay did not provide enough new and fresh features to differentiate it from other twin-stick shooters, but praised the addition of cooperative gameplay. He noted that two player cooperative "gives you a chance to strategize with a friend." Grabowski expressed disappointment in the fact online play was omitted, but conceded that local cooperative play that allows the second player to join or leave the game at any time was a welcome addition.
