= CyberCode =

Visual tagging system

CyberCode is a visual tagging system based on a 2D barcode technology. Designed to be read by low-cost CMOS or CCD cameras common in mobile devices, it can also be used to determine the 3D position of the tagged object as well as its ID number.

A CyberCode tag is a 2D barcode symbology designed to be read from many angles. A computer with attached camera can locate the tag and decode the data within the 2D barcode. Visual fiduciary markers surrounding the barcode allow the computer to quickly locate the tag within the field of view of the camera. Additionally, the design of the CyberCode tag allows the computer to track position and orientation in three dimensions.

These features allow the tags to be used for augmented reality applications. CyberCode tags affixed to real-world objects would allow the user to view the world through the camera and have the computer overlay additional information over the display. The information encoded in the barcode identifies the object, and because of the tag's design, the computer can detect the orientation of the object relative to the viewer.

The main limitation of CyberCode is its extremely limited capacity. Holding only 24 data bits plus 7 error correction bits (or 48+14 in a double-sized variant), the number of objects it can identify is limited.

== Examples ==
In the video game "Eye of Judgment", CyberCode tags are printed on collectible cards. The surface where the cards are played is situated in front of a camera and the image is shown on the screen. When cards are placed in front of a camera, the computer displays a 3D model over the image of the card. As the card is moved and rotated on the playing surface, the computer can re-orient the 3D model to the new position of the card.

Some other, hypothetical examples include:

- A CyberCode tag is printed next to each diagram in an anatomy textbook. A student, equipped with a video-enabled phone or computer can quickly bring up a 3D version of the diagram on the computer and rotate and zoom to get a better view.
- An auto mechanic, equipped with video goggles could look at an engine and have diagnostic information overlain on the actual engine he is working on.
- CyberCode tags placed on products in a store would allow a shopper with a camera-equipped phone or PDA to quickly reference additional information such as videos of the product in use or consumer reviews.
- CyberCode tags in print advertisements could allow readers to quickly bookmark the manufacturer's website without the need to type the address into the computer.

== See also ==
- mobile tagging
