= PlayStation Eye =

Digital camera device for the PlayStation 3

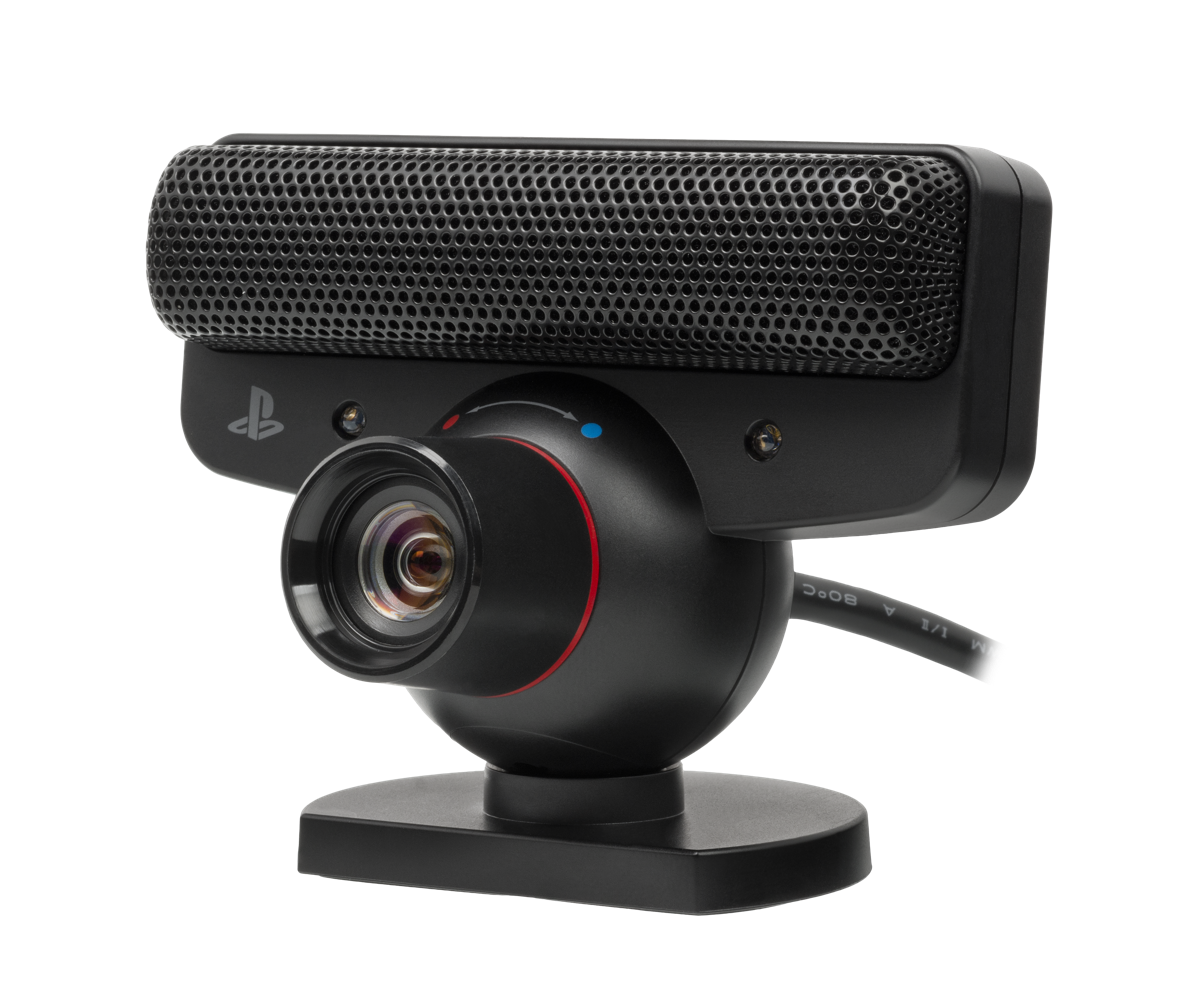
- Developer: Sony Computer Entertainment
- Product family: PlayStation
- Type: Gaming webcam
- Generation: Seventh
- Released: October 23, 2007
- Camera: 640×480 pixels @ 60 Hz; 320×240 pixels @ 120 Hz
- Connectivity: USB 2.0 (type-A)
- Platform: PlayStation 3
- Dimensions: 80 mm × 55 mm × 65 mm (3.25" × 2.12" × 2.5")
- Predecessor: EyeToy
- Successor: PlayStation Camera
- Related: PlayStation Move, EyeToy, Xbox Live Vision, Kinect

The PlayStation Eye (trademarked PLAYSTATION Eye) is a digital camera device, similar to a webcam, for the PlayStation 3. The technology uses computer vision and gesture recognition to process images taken by the camera. This allows players to interact with games using motion and color detection as well as sound through its built-in microphone array. It is the successor to the EyeToy for the PlayStation 2, which was released in 2003.

The peripheral was launched in a bundle with The Eye of Judgment in the United States on October 23, 2007, in Japan and Australia on October 25, 2007 and in Europe on October 26, 2007.

The PlayStation Eye was also released as a stand-alone product in the United States, Europe, and Australia. EyeToy designer Richard Marks stated that the EyeToy was used as a model for the rough cost design.

The device is succeeded by PlayStation Camera for PlayStation 4.

== Features ==
=== Camera ===
The PlayStation Eye is capable of capturing standard video with frame rates of 60 hertz at a 640×480 pixel resolution, and 120 hertz at 320×240 pixels, which is "four times the resolution" and "two times the frame-rate" of the EyeToy, according to Sony. Higher frame rate, up to 320×240@187 or 640×480@75 fps, can be selected by specific applications (FreeTrack and LinuxTrack).

The PlayStation Eye also has "two times the sensitivity" of the EyeToy, with Sony collaborating with sensor chip partner OmniVision Technologies on a sensor chip design using larger sensor pixels, allowing more effective low-light operation. Sony states that the PlayStation Eye can produce "reasonable quality video" under the illumination provided by a television set.

The camera features a two-setting adjustable fixed-focus zoom lens. Selected manually by rotating the lens barrel, the PlayStation Eye can be set to a 56° field of view (red dot) similar to that of the EyeToy, for close-up framing in chat applications, or a 75° field of view (blue dot) for long-shot framing in interactive physical gaming applications.

The PlayStation Eye is capable of outputting video to the console uncompressed, with "no compression artifacts"; or with optional JPEG compression. 8 bits per pixel is the sensor native color depth.

=== Microphone ===
The PlayStation Eye features a built-in four-capsule microphone array, with which the PlayStation 3 can employ technologies for multi-directional voice location tracking, echo cancellation, and background noise suppression. This allows the peripheral to be used for speech recognition and audio chat in noisy environments without the use of a headset. The PlayStation Eye microphone array operates with each channel processing 16-bit samples at a sampling rate of 48 kilohertz, and a signal-to-noise ratio of 90 decibels.

=== Applications ===
Like its predecessor, the EyeToy, the PlayStation Eye enables natural user interface and mixed reality video game applications through the use of computer vision (CV) and gesture recognition technologies implemented in the software. Though initial PlayStation Eye software has mostly been based on the same general techniques as the EyeToy (e.g. simple edge detection and color tracking, Digimask face mapping), (Note: One notable exception is The Eye of Judgment, which uses CyberCode visual tagging.) since the announcement of the forthcoming camera-based PlayStation Move and Kinect (then known as "Project Natal") control systems at the 2009 Electronic Entertainment Expo, Sony has been promoting a number of other technologies available for the PlayStation Eye. Among these are the Vision Library, which can perform advanced facial recognition/analysis and CV-based head tracking, and PSVR (PlayStation Voice Recognition), a speech recognition library intended to support about 20 different languages. According to Sony; the facial technology can identify features such as eyes, mouth, eyebrows, nose, and eyeglasses; read the shape of the mouth and detect a smile; (Note: See facial expression capture.) determine the position and orientation of the subject's head; and estimate the age and gender of the face.

In addition to gaming-oriented uses, Sony has stated that the PlayStation Eye will also feature applications for tasks such as interactive communication and content creation (e.g. movie-making and video blogging). An AV Chat feature allows for audio-visual chat with anyone on a user's PlayStation Network friends list (up to six at once). Additional free content and activities are planned for release via the PlayStation Network.

==== EyeCreate ====
video is taken with the PlayStation Eye

The PlayStation Eye features free EyeCreate video editing software, which enables users to capture pictures, video, and audio clips directly to the hard drive of the PlayStation 3 console. EyeCreate features a variety of different capturing modes, including stop motion and time-lapse. Through the software, users can edit, save, and share their own custom images, movies, and audio content.

Videos created using the program can be exported as MPEG-4 files for use outside PlayStation 3 consoles.

==== PlayStation Move ====
First revealed on June 2, 2009, PlayStation Move is a motion control system for the PlayStation 3 based on video tracking and inertial sensors. Based on a wand controller, PlayStation Move uses the PlayStation Eye to track the wand's position in three dimensions through a special illuminated orb at the end. The controller was released in the EU, UK and USA in September 2010, with an Asian release date listed as October 21, 2010.

== Compatible games ==
The following are some PlayStation 3 games with camera functionality, some of which may not be specifically developed for the PlayStation Eye. The PlayStation Eye does not support EyeToy compatible PlayStation 2 games.

- 2007
  - Aqua Vita/Aquatopia
  - Ember
  - Mesmerize (January 17, 2008 in North America)
  - Operation Creature Feature
  - The Eye of Judgment (uses PlayStation Eye on a stand and playing mat with cards to simulate card battles)
  - The Trials of Topoq
  - Tiger Woods PGA Tour 08
  - Tori-Emaki
  - SingStar
  - Sky Blue
  - Snakeball
  - PES 2008
  - EyeCreate (software, not a game)
- 2008
  - Buzz!: Quiz TV (also compatible with PlayStation 2 EyeToy)
  - Burnout Paradise (used to take personal snapshot after winning/losing against other players online. Also compatible with PlayStation 2 EyeToy)
  - FaceBreaker (used to capture personal image for the character)
  - GTI Club+: Rally Côte d'Azur
  - High Stakes on the Vegas Strip: Poker Edition (used to see others)
  - LittleBigPlanet (Used to turn images into in-game "stickers" in real time, all with different shapes and borders. These stickers could be placed onto any part of any in-game level.)
  - PES 2009 (used to capture personal image for the character, "Become a Legend" mode)
  - SingStar Vol. 2 (used to record video and take snapshots and upload online)
  - Tom Clancy's Rainbow Six: Vegas 2 (used to capture personal image for the character)
- 2009
  - Bomberman Ultra (streams video to other players when a tournament is won)
  - Buzz!: Quiz World
  - Tiger Woods 10
  - Fight Night Round 4
  - EyePet (Europe)
- 2010
  - Gran Turismo 5 (for head tracking)
  - EyePet
  - The Shoot
  - Kung-Fu Live (for full body tracking)
  - Def Jam Rapstar
  - Start the Party
  - Time Crisis: Razing Storm
  - TV Superstars
  - Buzz!: The Ultimate Music Quiz
  - The Fight: Lights Out (for head tracking)
  - EA MMA (for facial mapping on custom character)
  - Sports Champions
- 2011
  - Fight Night Champion
  - LittleBigPlanet 2 (see LittleBigPlanet)
  - Michael Jackson The Experience
  - Kung Fu Live
- 2012
  - Ōkami HD
- Unreleased
  - Eyedentify

== PC drivers and applications ==
While there is no official support or drivers by Sony to run the PlayStation Eye on other platforms such as personal computers, there are community-supported drivers available for Mac OS, (Note: Working drivers for MacOS can be downloaded from https://webcam-osx.sourceforge.net/ and https://github.com/inspirit/PS3EYEDriver/) Linux, (Note: There is support for the camera in Linux kernel 2.6.29. Drivers for earlier kernels can be downloaded from http://kaswy.free.fr/?q=node/38#ps3.) and NetBSD (Note: A working driver is included with NetBSD 5.0 and above, see https://man.NetBSD.org/cgi-bin/man-cgi?pseye++NetBSD-current for more information.) and a commercially available driver for Windows. (Note: A working driver for Windows XP and Vista can be downloaded from https://codelaboratories.com/downloads)

A video capture and analysis application is available for Windows. (Note: A video capture and analysis application for Windows can be downloaded from https://www.heath-studios.com/#proam1)

== See also ==
- EyeToy
- PlayStation Move
- Xbox Live Vision
- Kinect
