= Mesmerize (video game) =

2007 video game

- Developers: London Studio; Playlogic Entertainment
- Publisher: Sony Computer Entertainment
- Series: PlayStation Eye
- Engine: Havok
- Platform: PlayStation 3
- Release: 20 December 2007
- Genre: Interactive art
- Mode: Single-player

Mesmerize is a 2007 interactive art video game developed by London Studio and Playlogic Entertainment and published by Sony Computer Entertainment for the PlayStation 3. It utilizes the PlayStation Eye camera peripheral. It was released on the PlayStation Store on 20 December 2007.

== Gameplay ==
Mesmerize is a suite of visual and aural effects that respond to the user's body movements and sounds, such as clapping hands or clicking fingers. By moving their body and making sounds, the user can manipulate shapes, colours and lights as they appear on-screen. The game contains a selection of different modes to choose from, including Chain Reaction, Firefly, Twister, Flare, Genepool, Flora, Fallout, Blurmotion, Pincushion and Urban. The visual effects displayed will change with the mode the user chooses.

== Reception ==
PlayStation Official Magazine UK rated the game 50/100, stating that "It's a cheap way to show off your sexy new HDTV".
