= Kung-Fu Live =

2010 video game

- Kung-Fu Live logo
- Developer: Virtual Air Guitar
- Publisher: Virtual Air Guitar
- Engine: Gamebryo
- Platform: PlayStation 3 (PlayStation Network)
- Release: NA: 7 December 2010; EU: 8 December 2010; AU: 8 December 2010
- Genres: Action, Fighting
- Modes: Single-Player, Multiplayer

Kung-Fu Live is an interactive fighting game developed by Virtual Air Guitar Company exclusively for the PlayStation Network.

The game tracks the players movement using the PlayStation Eye and free-motion technology.

== Reception ==
Reception

Aggregate scores
Aggregator	Score
GameRankings	53.76%
Metacritic	50/100

Kung-Fu Live has received generally mixed reviews. It had an average score of 53.76% at GameRankings, based on 27 reviews and an average score of 50/100 at Metacritic, based on 30 reviews.

Ryan Clements, a writer for IGN who rated the game a 40/100, wrote that the game "has an appealing premise and fun visuals, but I can't recommend a game that left me feeling so defeated."

Steven Williamson, who writes for PSU.com and rated the game a 5.5/10, says "Meet the strict criteria for set-up and calibration and you might enjoy the novelty of seeing yourself kicking ass on screen, but you'll still have to battle with the controls just as much as you will against the bad guys."
