= NBA Unrivaled =

2009 basketball video game

- Developer(s): A.C.R.O.N.Y.M. Games
- Publisher(s): Tecmo
- Director(s): Murray McCarron
- Producer(s): Ray Murakawa; Michael Fahrny
- Designer(s): Sandy Spangler
- Platform(s): Xbox 360; PlayStation 3
- Release: Xbox 360; November 11, 2009; PlayStation 3: NA: April 1, 2010; EU: June 23, 2010
- Genre(s): Sports-simulation
- Mode(s): Single-player, multiplayer

NBA Unrivaled is a sports-simulation video game developed by Vancouver-based studio A.C.R.O.N.Y.M. Games and published by Tecmo.

== Gameplay ==
Wilson Chandler scoring two points in the game

The gameplay revolves around controlling a team of basketball players and competing against either AI-controlled teams or other players in online multiplayer matches. Players have the opportunity to select from a roster of real-life NBA players, each with their unique skills, strengths, and playstyles.

Players can play as players such as Dwight Howard, Kevin Durant, Kobe Bryant, LeBron James, and Shaquille O'Neal.

The game offers various modes, including exhibition matches, tournaments, and season modes, allowing players to engage in different basketball experiences. In exhibition matches, players can quickly jump into a game for a casual play session. At the same time, tournaments and season modes offer more in-depth and long-term gameplay experiences with progression elements such as team management, player development, and season standings.

NBA Unrivaled uses realistic basketball mechanics, aiming to capture the pace, intensity, and tactics of real NBA games. Players can dribble, pass, shoot, and defend using intuitive controls that aim to replicate playing basketball on a real court. The game also features commentary and crowd reactions, enhancing the atmosphere and immersion during matches.

== Reception ==
Reception

Aggregate score
Aggregator	Score	
Aggregator	PS3	Xbox 360
Metacritic	24/100	25/100

Review scores
Publication	Score	
Publication	PS3	Xbox 360
1Up.com	N/A	D−
GamePro	0.5/5 stars	N/A
GameSpot	N/A	2/10
GameZone	N/A	5.5/10
IGN	2.5/10	2.5/10
PlayStation Official Magazine – UK	1/10	N/A
Official Xbox Magazine (US)	N/A	1.5/10
PSM3	63%	N/A
TeamXbox	N/A	2/10

NBA Unrivaled received "generally unfavorable reviews" on both platforms according to the review aggregation website Metacritic.

Brett Todd of GameSpot said of the Xbox 360 version, "What's most surprising about NBA Unrivaled is that it made it out to the public. Regardless of how you feel about basketball and retro basketball arcade games, you should avoid this game at all costs." GameZone said of the same console version, "For the high price mark of $15 you're just not getting enough. The gameplay is good when played correctly, but that same lack of lenience in play style is also a deficiency. Most players will not be able to find enough value to make it worth their purchase." Official Xbox Magazine called it "the worst sports game in Xbox history!" PlayStation Official Magazine – UK said, "you should try playing this only to laugh at its total, across-the-board incompetence, but it'd be like recommending you throw eight quid into the bin and then roll around naked and giggling in a pile of your own feces. Unrivaled indeed."
