= ProStroke Golf: World Tour 2007 =

2006 video game

- Developer: Gusto Games
- Publisher: Oxygen Games
- Platforms: Microsoft Windows; PlayStation 2 Xbox; PlayStation Portable
- Release: Windows: EU: August 18, 2006; NA: August 29, 2006; PlayStation 2: EU: August 18, 2006; NA: September 1, 2006; Xbox: EU: August 18, 2006; NA: September 12, 2006; PlayStation Portable: EU: October 27, 2006; AU: December 7, 2006; NA: March 8, 2007
- Genre: Sports
- Modes: Single-player, multiplayer

ProStroke Golf: World Tour 2007 is a golfing simulator game for Microsoft Windows, PlayStation 2, Xbox and PlayStation Portable. It was developed by Gusto Games, published by Oxygen Games, and released in 2006–07.

== Gameplay ==
ProStroke Golf is an offline golf simulator game that can be played with up to 4 persons on a single console. It has a training mode, a quick round option, tournament play, or career game mode. It has eight licensed professional golfers and 16 fantasy courses. Commentary is provided by Ian Baker Finch, Sam Torrance, and Alan Green.

== Reception ==
Reception

Aggregate scores
| Aggregator | Score |
|---|---|
| GameRankings | (Xbox) 70.44% (PS2) 63.17% (PSP) 59.63% (PC) 55.62% |
| Metacritic | (Xbox) 66/100 (PS2) 63/100 (PSP) 60/100 (PC) 56/100 |

Review scores
| Publication | Score |
|---|---|
| Eurogamer | 7/10 |
| GameSpot | (PSP) 5.6/10 (PC) 5.3/10; 5/10 |
| GameZone | (PC) 7/10 (Xbox) 6.3/10 (PSP) 6.2/10 |
| IGN | 7/10 (PSP) 6.8/10 |
| Official Xbox Magazine (US) | 7/10 |
| PALGN | 7/10 |
| PC Gamer (UK) | 69% |
| PlayStation: The Official Magazine | 6/10 |
| VideoGamer.com | 7/10 (PSP) 6/10 |
| X-Play | 2/5 |
| The Times | 3/5 |

The game was met with mixed to very negative reception, due to its plot. GameRankings and Metacritic gave it a score of 30.78% and 58.54 out of 100 for the Xbox version; 63.17% and 63 out of 100 for the PlayStation 2 version; 59.63% and 60 out of 100 for the PSP version; and 55.62% and 56 out of 100 for the PC version.
