= Monster Hunter Frontier G =

2013 video game

- PlayStation 3 cover art
- Developer: Capcom
- Publisher: Capcom
- Series: Monster Hunter
- Platforms: Windows, Xbox 360, PlayStation Vita, PlayStation 3, Wii U
- Release: Windows, Xbox 360: JP: April 17, 2013; PlayStation 3: JP: November 20, 2013; Wii U: JP: December 11, 2013; PlayStation Vita: JP: August 13, 2014
- Genre: Action role-playing
- Modes: Single-player, multiplayer

Monster Hunter Frontier G is an updated version of Monster Hunter Frontier, a massively multiplayer online role-playing game (MMORPG) in the Monster Hunter series for Microsoft Windows, Xbox 360, PlayStation Vita, PlayStation 3, and Wii U. As of August 2014, the game had 4.5 million registered players. The game's service was shut down in December 2019.

== Development ==
Capcom announced Monster Hunter Frontier G on September 2, 2012, as a major update to Monster Hunter Frontier Online for the PC and Xbox 360. The new update would include 10 new monsters, upgrade 21 current monsters to G-rank, over 150 G class weapons and armor sets, 30 new skills, 4 new elementals, and new actions for 11 weapon types. It was also later announced that it would be released as a standalone game for the PlayStation 3 and Wii U around the end of 2013.

Capcom initially stated that it had no plans to bring the Monster Hunter franchise to the PlayStation Vita, but announced a port of Monster Hunter Frontier G during Tokyo Game Show 2013. The company stated that Vita players would have the ability to share character data with the upcoming PS3 version, similar to portable releases on other platforms like the Nintendo 3DS and Wii U.

== Promotions ==
Monster Hunter Frontier G had a number of promotional outfits available as part of collaborations with other companies. These included characters from Fire Emblem, Sengoku Basara, Street Fighter, Fate/stay night, as well as Hatsune Miku and many more.

The theme song for the game, Secrear, is performed by Maaya Sakamoto.
