= Novastrike =

2008 video game

- Developer(s): Tiki Games
- Publisher(s): Tiki Games
- Engine: Inhouse
- Platform(s): PlayStation 3
- Release: June 5, 2008
- Genre(s): Multidirectional shooter
- Mode(s): Single player

Novastrike is a downloadable game for the Sony PlayStation 3 video game console by American studio Tiki Games.

== Gameplay ==
Gameplay screenshot.

Novastrike is a top-down shoot 'em up game. Gameplay is very simplistic; you must shoot everything you see, but with "next-gen" graphics and sound effects.

The player controls an experimental fighter called the Scythe, a hybrid of human and alien technology. The Scythe can pick up weapon parts and "mega packs" left from destroyed enemies to upgrade weapons.
