= Kinetica (disambiguation) =

Kinetica is a PlayStation 2 video game.

Kinetica may also refer to:

- Kinetica (game engine), a game engine first used in the Kinetica video game
- Kinetica (software), an American software company
- Kinetica Sports Ltd, an Irish sports nutrition company
- Kinetica, former name for the Australian National Bibliographic Database
- Kinetica 1, a rocket by CAS Space
- Kinetica 2, a rocket by CAS Space
- Kinetica 3, a planned rocket by CAS Space
