= D1 Recordings =

Independent record label in Ireland

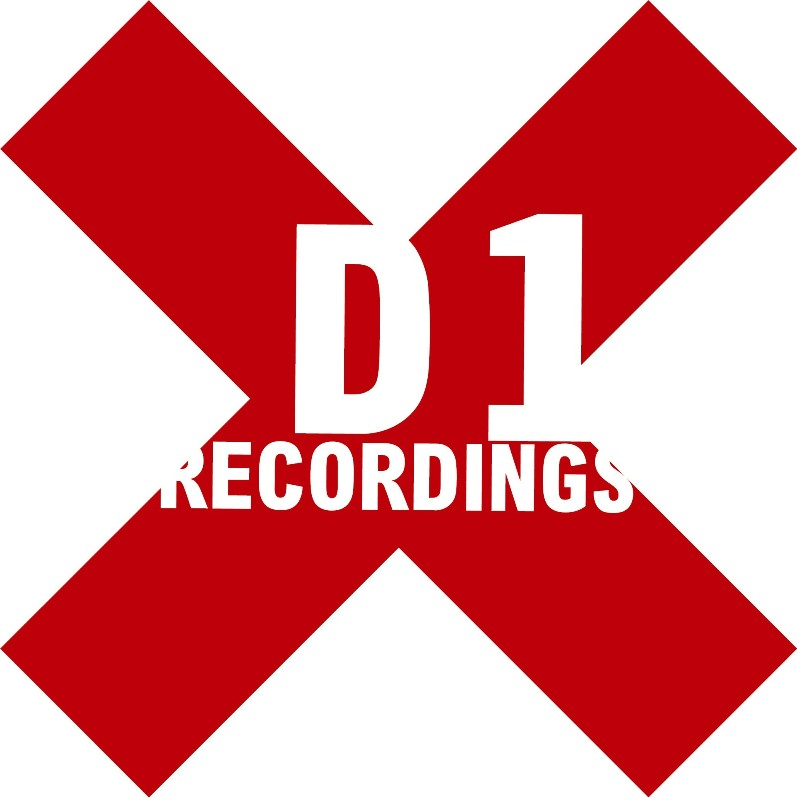
D1 Recordings logo

D1 Recordings is an Irish independent techno record label founded in 1994 by Eamonn Doyle. It is named after the Dublin postcode in which it was located and has released music by artists from there and elsewhere.

Ian Maleney wrote in The Irish Times in 2015 that "D1 is considered one of the most important chapters in recent Irish music history".

== History ==
Doyle worked in the independent music business for 15 years. Around 1993 he and others set up a recording studio in the basement of the building he lived in at 147 Parnell Street in Dublin's north inner city. Some of that music was released on the Dead Elvis indie record label he co-founded and ran. Doyle became a DJ, then founded D1 Recordings in 1994.

D1 Recordings also ran a recording studio (d1), record shop and, eventually, a distribution company (Dublin Distribution) all in the same Parnell Street building. D1 also ran a weekly club night on Saturday nights for over a decade.

Doyle also set up two subsidiary labels called D1aspora [Distributed via Submerge in Detroit] and DublinLondon with UK electronic music producer Mark Broom.

By the end of the 2000s, the shop, distribution company and club had closed down.

Ian Maleney wrote in The Irish Times in 2015 that "D1 is considered one of the most important chapters in recent Irish music history".

== Artists past and present ==
- Baiyon
- Mark Broom (AKA Visitor)
- Eamonn Doyle
- Roger Doyle
- Peter Van Hoesen
- Pan-Pot
