= Eamonn Doyle =

Irish photographer, electronic music producer, DJ, and record label owner

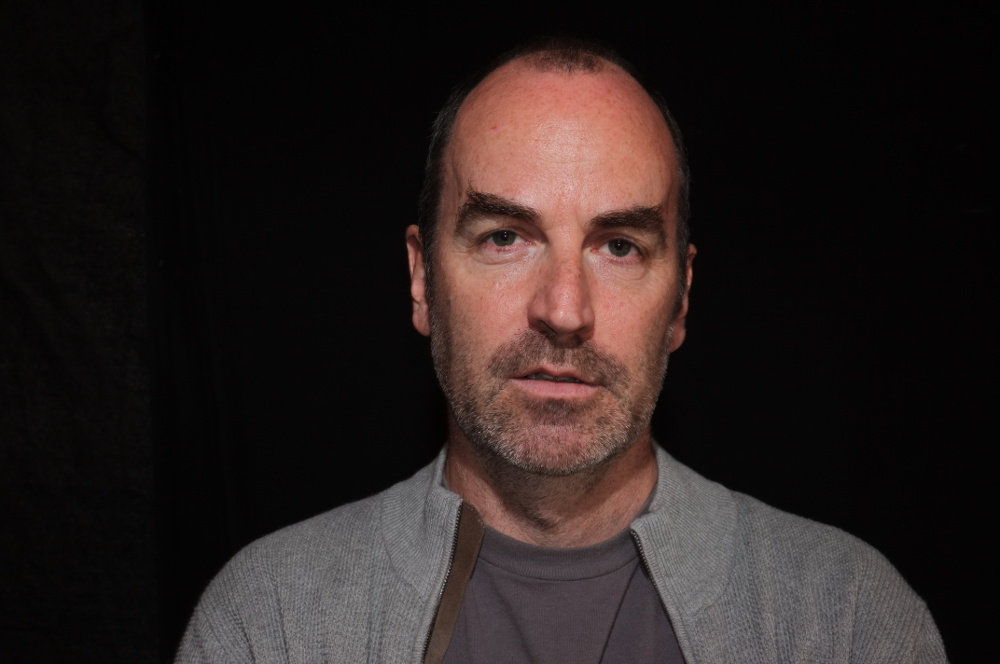
- Doyle in 2014
- Born: 1969 (age 56–57); Dublin, Ireland
- Occupations: Photographer, music producer, record label owner, DJ
- Years active: 1991-present
- Known for: Photography, Music
- Notable work: Photobooks: i, ON, END, K
- Website: www.eamonndoyle.com

Eamonn Doyle (born 1969) is an Irish photographer, electronic music producer, DJ, and owner/manager of the D1 Recordings record label. He has produced a number of records of his own music. His self-published photo-books include the trilogy i (2014), ON (2015) and End (2016), set in Dublin where he lives. He founded and ran the Dublin Electronic Arts Festival from 2001 to 2009.

Ian Maleney wrote in The Irish Times in 2015 that "D1 is considered one of the most important chapters in recent Irish music history". Martin Parr declared i "the best street photobook in a decade".

== Early life and education ==
Doyle was born in Dublin. He studied commercial photography in Dún Laoghaire College of Art and Design (1988–1991).

== Music ==
Doyle worked in the independent music business for 15 years. Around 1993 he and others set up a recording studio in the basement of the building he lived in at 147 Parnell Street in Dublin's north inner city. Some of that music was released on the Dead Elvis indie record label he co-founded and ran. Doyle became a DJ, then founded the techno record label D1 Recordings (named after the postcode it was located in) in 1994 which released music by artists from Dublin and elsewhere. D1 Recordings also ran a recording studio (d1), record shop and, eventually, a distribution company (Dublin Distribution) all in the same Parnell Street building. D1 also ran a weekly club night on Saturday nights for over a decade. The label resurfaced in 2018 in preparation for their 25th anniversary vinyl boxset release. Ian Maleney wrote in The Irish Times in 2015 that "D1 is considered one of the most important chapters in recent Irish music history". Doyle also set up two subsidiary labels called D1aspora [Distributed via Submerge in Detroit] and DublinLondon with UK electronic music producer Mark Broom.

Doyle produces and releases his own music through D1 Recordings and various other labels on 12" records and for download. He also produces music with Scott Logan as Active Service Unit.

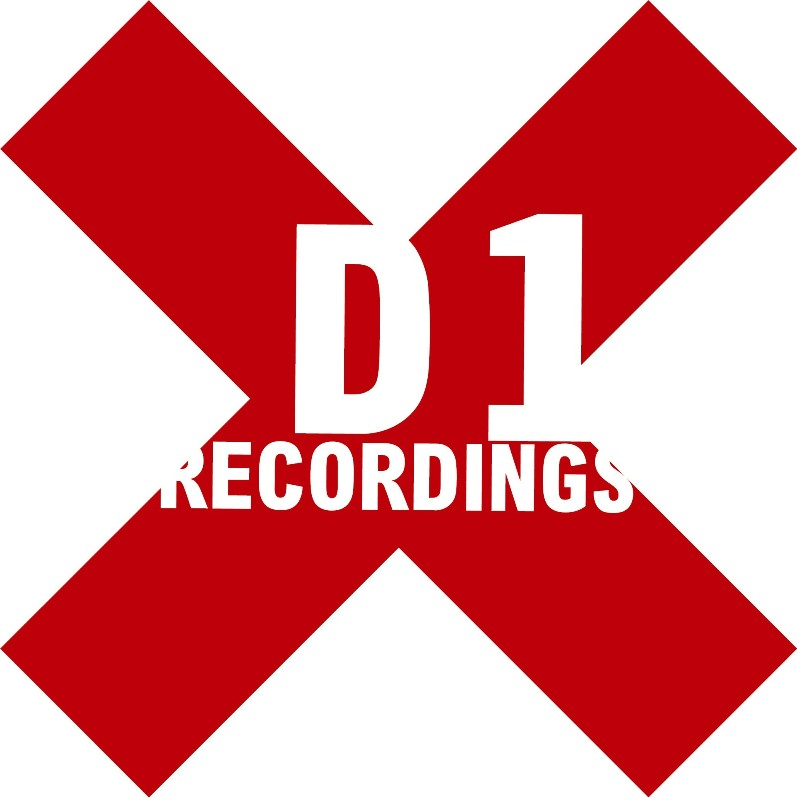
D1 Recordings logo

== Dublin Electronic Arts Festival ==
Doyle founded the Dublin Electronic Arts Festival (DEAF) in 2001 which he ran until 2009. The annual festival would take place over the course of nearly a week with events in venues across the city.

DEAF closed when both Arts Council funding and sponsorship money stopped due to the post-2008 Irish economic downturn.

== Photography ==
Doyle returned to photography in 2008, making street photographs of people on Parnell Street and O'Connell Street. He produced a trilogy of self-published photo-books on Dublin that were well received.

i (2014) was inspired by Samuel Beckett. Doyle's subjects were elderly working-class people photographed "from above, as if looming over them while they went about their daily business." Martin Parr declared it "the best street photobook in a decade". In ON (2015) "the location remains the same – Parnell Street and O’Connell Street in Dublin – but, this time, the subjects are younger and more varied in terms of ethnicity. Whereas i evoked an almost timeless Dublin, On shows a markedly contemporary city, where people stride purposefully onward, intent on their destination rather than their journey." End (2016) concluded the trilogy. K (2018) was made at the western Atlantic edge of Ireland.

== Publications ==
=== Photography books by Doyle ===
- State Visit. Dublin: Self-published / D1, 2013.
- i. Dublin: Self-published / D1, 2014. Edition of 750 copies.
- ON. Dublin: Self-published / D1, 2015. ISBN 978-0-99284-871-2. Edition of 999 copies (333 in each colour).
- End. Dublin: Self-published / D1, 2016. Photographs by Doyle, drawings by Niall Sweeney and ambient soundtrack by David Donohoe. ISBN 978-0-99284-8729. 13 sections and a 7" vinyl record, housed in a slipcase. Edition of 1000 copies.
- K. Dublin: Self-published / D1, 2018. Photographs by Doyle, music by David Donohoe. Includes a 10" vinyl record. Edition of 1000 copies.
- Made In Dublin. London: Thames & Hudson, 2019. Photographs by Doyle, text by Kevin Barry. ISBN 9780500545089
- Eamonn Doyle. RM/Fundación Mapfre, 2020. Photographs by Doyle, text by Sweeney, David Donohoe, Bob Quinn, Lisa Godson. ISBN 978-8417975005
- O. Self-published / D1, 2020. Edition of 250 copies. ISBN 978-0-9928487-4-3.

=== Other photography publications by Doyle ===
- One. Self-published / D1, 2021. Edition of 300 copies. ISBN 978-0-9928487-5-0.
- Two. Self-published / D1, 2022. Edition of 300 copies. ISBN 978-0-9928487-6-7.

=== Photography books with contributions by Doyle ===
- Moral Phobia: ein Zeitgeist-Glossar von Achtsamkeit bis Zigarette. Berlin: Gudberg Nerger, 2015. By Judith Mair and Bitten Stetter. ISBN 978-3-943061-35-2. Includes Doyle's i series.
- Mono Vol 2. London: Goma, 2015. ISBN 978-0957414525. Includes Doyle's ON series.
- CPHOTO - Street - Calle. Ivory Press, Spain. ISBN 9788494282003
- ARLES 2016 Les Recontres De La Photographie. France ISBN 9782330064679.
- 100 Great Street Photographs. Prestel ISBN 9783791383132.
- The Grain of the Present. San Francisco: Pier 24 Photography, 2018. ISBN 9781597110006. Edition of 1000 copies.
- Off The Wall - Cultures Photo 10. Paris.
- Prix Pictet 07: Space. London: teNeues, 2017. ISBN 9783832769079.
- Landskrona Foto: View Ireland. 2016. Sweden. ISBN 9789198303414.

=== Exhibition catalogues ===
- John McMahon, Eamonn Doyle: i, IRL — Landskrona Foto View: Ireland, Landskrona, Sweden, 2016
- Eamonn Doyle: End., Arles 2016, Les Rencontres de la Photographie, France, 2016
- Eamonn Doyle: i and State Visit, The Grain of the Present, Pier 24 Gallery, USA, 2017
- Eamonn Doyle: ON, Nuit de la Photo, La Chaux-de-Fonds, Switzerland, 'The Collectors Vision: Martin Parr's, 2017
- Best Photobooks — Eamonn Doyle, i, Photobook Phenomenon, RM, Spain, 2017

== Discography ==
=== 12" EPs ===
==== As Eamonn Doyle ====
- Defect - D1 Recordings Vol. 1 (D1 Recordings, 1997)
- Ghost of the Machine (Hertz, 2005) – edition of 300 copies
- Red Shift (D1 Recordings, 2006)
- Come Down on the Music (D1 Recordings, 2007)
- The Red Queen (Lunar Disco, 2018)
- Shelter E.P. (Piranha Records)

==== With Scott Logan as Active Service Unit ====
- Favoured State / Variable, Active Service Unit (D1, 1997)
- Allegro by Scott Logan (Paradiddle, 2001) – includes Township Jive by Doyle and Scott Logan, and Allegro (D1 Mix) remixed by Doyle

==== With David Donohoe as String Machine ====
- String Machine CD (Goethe Institute, 2012)

==== Under various pseudonyms ====
- Archive One [As The Seventh Earth Project] (D1, 2010)
- Takin It Home" [As D1] - D1 25th Anniversary Compilation (D1, 2019)
- Get of my planet by sundown" [As Seventh Earth Project] - D1 25th Anniversary Compilation (D1, 2019)
- Mid-Term Break" [As LDR-21] - D1 25th Anniversary Compilation (D1, 2019)
- If I make it to the end" [As H. Williams] - D1 25th Anniversary Compilation (D1, 2019)
- Hi Frequency O" [As Extremdura] - D1 25th Anniversary Compilation (D1, 2019)
- Loomereclipse" [Nnomae Elyod] - D1 25th Anniversary Compilation (D1, 2019)

== Photography exhibitions ==
=== 2020 ===
- Eamonn Doyle, La Fundación Municipal de Cultura, Gijón, Spain

=== 2019 ===
- Eamonn Doyle, Fundación Mapfre Madrid, Spain
- Eamonn Doyle, Michael Hoppen Gallery, London, UK
- Eamonn Doyle, RHA Gallery Dublin, Ireland 2016
- Dublin: Trilogie, Centre Photographique, Pôle Image Haute-Normandie, France
- Eamonn Doyle: End., with drawings by Niall Sweeney and music by David Donohoe. L’Espace van Gogh, Rencontres d’Arles, France
- Eamonn Doyle: End., Michael Hoppen Gallery, London

=== 2015 ===
- Eamonn Doyle: ON, Photo Ireland — The Library Project, Ireland

=== 2014 ===
- Eamonn Doyle: i, street installation [2014 – 2017], O’Connell Street, Dublin, Ireland
- Eamonn Doyle: i, The Library Project, Dublin, Ireland
- COLLABORATIVE

=== 2026 ===
- Eamon Doyle, Niall Sweeney, David Donohue. The Museum of the Image, AS IF

=== 2019 ===
- Made In Dublin, Eamonn Doyle, Niall Sweeney, David Donohoe, Kevin Barry. Fundación Mapfre Madrid, Spain
- Made In Dublin, Eamonn Doyle, Niall Sweeney, David Donohoe, Kevin Barry. Photo London, Somerset House, London, UK
- Made In Dublin, Eamonn Doyle, Niall Sweeney, David Donohoe, Kevin Barry. RHA Gallery, Dublin, Ireland

=== 2018 ===
- Made In Dublin, Eamonn Doyle, Niall Sweeney, David Donohoe. ‘Where We Live’ festival, ThisIsPopBaby at The Complex, Dublin, Ireland
- GROUP

=== 2019 ===
- AIPAD, Pier 94, New York, USA
- Michael Hoppen Gallery, Grand Palais, Paris Photo, France

=== 2017 ===
- The Grain of the Present, Pier 24, San Francisco, USA

=== 2016 ===
- Annual Exhibition, RHA Gallery, Dublin, Ireland
- Landskrona Foto View 2016, Sweden
- Michael Hoppen Gallery, The Armory Show, New York, USA
- Photo London, Somerset House, London, UK
- Solas Ireland, Fotohof, Salzburg, Austria
- Solas Ireland, The Gallery of Photography, Dublin, Ireland

=== 2015 ===
- Annual Exhibition, RHA Gallery, Dublin, Ireland
- Michael Hoppen Gallery, Grand Palais, Paris Photo, France

=== 2014 ===
- Michael Hoppen Gallery, Grand Palais, Paris Photo, France
- So Fine Art group show, Dublin, Ireland
- Annual Exhibition, RHA Gallery, Dublin, Ireland
- New Works Award, Gallery of Photography, Dublin, Ireland

=== 2012 ===
- Annual Exhibition, RHA Gallery, Dublin, Ireland

=== 2006 ===
- Dublin Street Portraits, The Globe, Dublin, Ireland
- untitled installation, DEAF, Storehouse, Dublin, Ireland

=== 1991 ===
- Iontas Small Works, Sligo Art Gallery, Sligo, Ireland

== Awards ==
- 2015: Curtin O'Donoghue Photography Prize, Royal Hibernian Academy, Dublin for "Westmoreland St, Dublin"
- 2015: Joint winner, Solas Ireland Award, Source and the Gallery of Photography, Dublin. The other winners were Ciarán Óg Arnold, Enda Bowe, Emer Gillespie, Shane Lynam, Dara McGrath and Yvette Monahan.
