= Frogger in Toy Town =

2019 video game

- App icon
- Developer: Q-Games
- Publisher: Konami
- Producer: Dylan Cuthbert
- Programmer: Ryuji Nishikawa
- Artist: Yutaka Kurahashi
- Composer: Tomohisa Kuramitsu
- Series: Frogger
- Platforms: iOS, macOS, tvOS
- Release: WW: September 19, 2019
- Genre: Action
- Modes: Single-player, multiplayer

Frogger in Toy Town is a discontinued 2019 platform action game developed by Q-Games and published by Konami. It is part of the Frogger series. Players explore scrolling room-themed levels as Frogger, a frog on a mission to rescue abandoned froglets from human buildings.

The game was published by Konami in 2019 to mixed reviews, becoming one of the first games distributed through Apple Arcade. A sequel, Frogger and the Rumbling Ruins, was released on the service in 2022. After numerous major updates, it was discontinued by the platform on March 21, 2024. The service for the game, including playability, was suspended on April 4, 2024.

== Gameplay ==
Frogger explores a level in Mansion, the game's third chapter.

Frogger in Toy Town is a 3D scrolling platformer, featuring levels that scroll either vertically or horizontally. Five chapters of the game are divided into sets that resemble rooms and include 2 or 3 levels. Players control Frogger as he jumps through the level and dodges various household object-themed obstacles and enemies, such as toy cars, pins or living spring toys and helicopters. Neutral objects and constructions, as well as collectible jelly beans and power-ups, are scattered throughout each level. When the player accumulates 100 jelly beans, Frogger becomes invincible for a short period of time. If Frogger is attacked by an enemy, drowns in the water or falls off-screen, the player loses a life, while losing all three lives fails the level.

The level is completed once the player reaches a door leading out of the room. The main objective of the game is to rescue froglets found in each level and guide them to a checkpoint. After a froglet is collected by the player, he follows Frogger until a checkpoint; however, if Frogger loses a life before reaching the checkpoint, all collected froglets flee and can no longer be retrieved during an attempt. Other goals may include finishing a level in a certain way (e.g. without losing lives) and vary between levels. Completion of level goals throughout a chapter brings tokens, which unlock bonus levels, new character costumes and the following chapters. The bonus levels involve collecting frog-shaped emeralds and have a unique setting with no automatic scrolling. Each bonus level has a unique sound, recreated from previous Konami games, that can be collected and replayed in Audio Room.

The game includes a cooperative mode, allowing a second player to control another character via Game Center connection. It significantly reduces level difficulty, as all froglets, instead of disappearing from the level, gather around a second player when the first one is hit.

=== Frogger Game Show ===
A special episode released in honor of Peacock game show Frogger included a variation of rules similar to the one used in the show. Each level of the chapter is divided into five parts, alternating between running through obstacles and saving the froglets. Unlike other chapters, it has a time limit and only includes time attack missions, in the respective level parts the froglets are rescued automatically, and Frogger only loses a life when drowns. The completion time is recorded on a global leaderboard.

=== Endurance Mode ===
An endless runner mode called Endurance Mode features a simplified version of the game with only one available life. The majority of obstacles are toy cars driving sideways and logs floating on water similar to those in Crossy Road and the original Frogger. The mode consists of three packs of alternating pre-created levels with a progressive level of difficulty. A player scores points for each move forward, finishing a level or collecting frog trophies. Every third stage is a special stage featuring frog emeralds which bring additional points. The player's highscore is recorded on a global leaderboard.

== Plot ==
Frogger is a frog that is fascinated about the life of people and lives in a house-like den. In the first chapter, a hurricane strikes and flings inexperienced froglets into human buildings, frightening and dangerous for all other frogs. When Frogger is asked for help, he sets out on a quest to rescue the froglets. His feats are soon recognized by his community, and two allies join him on his mission.

== Production ==
Frogger in Toy Town was developed in Japan by Q-Games in 2019. After the game was greenlit by Apple Arcade, it entered production alongside Scrappers, a title in PixelJunk game series, also developed for Apple Arcade. The concept behind the game was to "reinvent the classic Frogger" and increase its appeal to younger audience by transporting the events in a real world. Adopting physics-based engine was intended to increase the variability of the game, making it less straightforward than the series' earlier titles. For the sound effects, composer Baiyon had sampled the sounds from real objects, while the background music was recorded using a collection of rare musical instruments, such as the lithophone.

The game was officially announced during the Apple Special Event on September 10, 2019, and was released with the launch of Apple Arcade on September 19. The first major update featuring a new game mode was released in November 2019, while a new Christmas and Halloween-themed house was added a month later. In 2020, a simple mode, as well as a fifth and final chapter were added. A third major update comprising "Endurance Mode" and new collectible features was released in March 2021. The game was updated for the last time in December 2021, bringing the "Frogger Game Show" chapter.

In March 2024, it was announced that Konami would be closing the game because of a series of technical issues. The game was delisted from Apple Arcade on March 21, 2024. On April 4, 2024, the profile of Frogger in Toy Town was terminated, and the access to the game was closed. As of 2024, it is not available on video gaming distribution services.

== Reception ==
Reception

Aggregate score
Aggregator	Score
Metacritic	65/100

Review scores
Publication	Score
Destructoid	5/10
TouchArcade	4/5
TheGamer	4/5

The game received mixed reviews. Most critics felt like it modernized the original game while retaining its core aspects. Andrew King of TheGamer considered the game to be "the first really good Frogger game since Frogger 2". The game's setting and graphics were also described as an improvement from the previous games, with credit given to the toy theme, music and special effects. Tyler Woodward from TouchArcade praised new mechanics and bonus stages that contributed to the variativity of the game. However, the gameplay received criticism for unpredictable character movements which could lead to taking unintended damage. A Destructoid review was heavily focused on the issues brought to the game by its gravity mechanics. The reviewer disliked that, unlike the arcade versions of the game, the number of jumps needed to make a transition, as well as the jump length, varies sufficiently, whereas the engine made occasional mistakes in hit detection. The swipe controls were criticized as well.
