= The Con =

The Con may refer to:

- The Con (album), an album by Tegan and Sara
- The Con (film), a 1998 television movie
- Sydney Conservatorium of Music
- The Con (TV series), a 2020 American television series
- The Con (video game), a fighting game with an urban theme
