= Escape Plan (video game) =

2012 video game

- Game logo
- Developer: Fun Bits Interactive (Note: Santa Monica Studio assisted on development. Wholesale Algorithms developed the PlayStation 4 version.)
- Publisher: Sony Computer Entertainment
- Engine: Unity3D
- Platforms: PlayStation Vita, PlayStation 4
- Release: PlayStation Vita: NA: February 14, 2012; PAL: February 22, 2012; JP: March 1, 2012; PlayStation 4: PAL: November 29, 2013; NA: December 3, 2013; JP: February 22, 2014
- Genre: Puzzle
- Mode: Single-player

Escape Plan is a 2012 puzzle video game developed by Fun Bits Interactive and published by Sony Computer Entertainment for the PlayStation Vita It was originally released as a launch title for the system. It is the debut game from new developer Fun Bits Interactive and is produced by Chris Millar, known for his previous work on Fat Princess. In previews of the game it was noted for its sharp, black-and-white visuals, gruesome yet humorous tone and its intuitive use of the PlayStation Vita's inputs including touch and gyroscopic control. A PlayStation 4 version was released in 2013.

== Gameplay ==
Players control two characters, Lil and Laarg (centre). One of Bakuki's minions can also be seen in this image (top left).

In Escape Plan, the player controls two characters, Lil and Laarg, through a series of booby-trapped rooms using the PlayStation Vita's front and rear multitouch panels and motion controls. The gesture-based control system requires players to trace paths for the characters and tap obstacles to move them out of the way and clear a path for them. Traps range from a single brick lying on the floor to enormous rotating fan blades. Failure to guide Lil and Laarg to safety usually results in a gruesome death.

The characters can traverse the game world in numerous ways. In some levels they are inflated with helium, requiring the player to tilt the console to guide them as they float around the room. Lil and Laarg usually move relatively slowly and in order to avoid fast-moving traps the player must grab the characters and pull them quickly to safety by pinching the Vita, touching both the front and rear panels at once.

=== Bakuki's Lair ===
Chris Millar, Fun Bits Interactive team lead, announced on PlayStation Blog that Escape Plan owners would receive Bakuki's Lair, a downloadable content (DLC) pack for Escape Plan, on April 10, 2012. It adds 19 prequel puzzle rooms to the adventures of Lil and Laarg. Together with the DLC, the update brings new tweaks and improvements based on player feedback, allowing for more pin-point accuracy on tap blocks, as well as an adjustment to the game's Star Rating system. The patch also lays the foundation for future updates.

== Reception ==
Reception

Aggregate score
Aggregator	Score	
Aggregator	PS Vita	PS4
Metacritic	71/100	73/100

Review scores
Publication	Score	
Publication	PS Vita	PS4
The A.V. Club	B	N/A
Destructoid	4.5/10	N/A
Eurogamer	6/10	N/A
Game Informer	7.75/10	N/A
GameRevolution	6/10	N/A
GameSpot	6/10	N/A
GameTrailers	8.4/10	7.2/10
Giant Bomb	3/5 stars	N/A
IGN	8/10	8/10
Joystiq	3.5/5 stars	N/A
Pocket Gamer	4.5/5 stars	N/A
PlayStation: The Official Magazine	7/10	N/A
Push Square	7/10	8/10
The Guardian	3/5 stars	N/A
The Digital Fix	7/10	N/A
Digital Spy	4/5 stars	N/A

At a preview event in October 2011, IGN editors ranked Escape Plan as their favourite PlayStation Vita game so far, commenting specifically on the game's "stunning", black and white chiaroscuro visuals, "great" classical soundtrack and gameplay which makes good use of many of the Vita's control features. In a December 2011 preview of the game, Destructoid's Samit Sarkar described it as "perhaps the best showcase of the Vita's unique capabilities".

Upon release, the game received "average" reviews on both platforms according to the review aggregation website Metacritic.

Digital Spy gave the Vita version four stars out of five and called it "one of the most unique and charming looking games you'll ever play, and the pick-up-and-play value makes it perfect for a handheld. Minor control issues prevent it from achieving perfection, but it's still perhaps the most effective showcase of the Vita hardware to date." The A.V. Club gave it a B and said that its "macabre humor and beautiful black-and-white chiaroscuro look make it a welcome respite from the noise and flash of the other Vita launch titles. Sony has a knack for finding and funding indie developers with a refined sense of style." The Digital Fix gave it seven out of ten and said, "In all, we can't help but think that Escape Plan represents a missed opportunity. The wonderfully stunning visuals, the understated sound track [sic] and intuitive control system so very nearly elevate the game into a poster boy for the new hardware. However, the short, unchallenging nature of the game moves us away from this territory and instead positions Escape Plan as more of an experience than an outright game, with the nods to cinematic practices of the past aiding its artistic endeavors." Edge gave it a score of seven out of ten, saying, "It's not perfect, and even skilled players will struggle with some of the more demanding multitasking required for certain scenarios (the level-skip is an acknowledgement of the inconsistent difficulty), but it's clever, cunning and entertaining."

As of April 2012, Escape Plan was the number one selling PlayStation Network game on the PlayStation Vita.
