= PixelJunk Eden =

2008 video game

- PlayStation Store icon
- Developer: Q-Games (Note: Additional work by Santa Monica Studio.)
- Publisher: Q-Games: WW: Sony Computer Entertainment (PS3)
- Composer: Baiyon
- Series: PixelJunk
- Platforms: PlayStation 3 Microsoft Windows
- Release: PlayStation 3 July 31, 2008; April 16, 2009 (Encore); Microsoft Windows; February 2, 2012
- Genres: Platform, puzzle

PixelJunk Eden is a video game developed and published by Q-Games for the PlayStation 3 and Microsoft Windows. The third game in the PixelJunk series, it was released on the PlayStation Store on July 31, 2008 worldwide by Sony Computer Entertainment. A demo of the game was released on July 25, 2008. The game features the work of Baiyon, an independent artist from Kyoto who was invited by the studio founder Dylan Cuthbert to design the graphics and soundtrack.

== Gameplay ==
In PixelJunk Eden, players, as "Grimps", swing from abstract plant shapes to move about the garden, attacking the six-sided pollen carriers in order to gather the small pollen particles that can turn dormant seeds (top right) into activated seeds (top left). The new seeds can be used to create new plants and gain further mobility in the garden.

The player controls a "Grimp" (derived from the actions "grip" and "jump"), a small creature that maneuvers itself by jumping from and attaching itself to plant-like structures. The Grimp also has the abilities to swing itself from a silk-like tether for a short amount of time and spin while jumping. Using these abilities, the objective of the Grimp is to collect several objects called "Spectra" that are found in the game's stages (or "gardens"). Usually located high above the player's starting point, spectra must be reached by activating seeds, which will grow out into structures the Grimp can attach itself to. At first dormant, seeds can be activated by collecting pollen and jumping into them. Pollen is obtained by having the Grimp hit enemies with its body or the silk it is swinging from, and then jumping or swinging through the particles as they float to the ground. The player can attempt to jump and swing through multiple enemies without landing on the ground or a plant, each one creating a chain and increasing the amount of pollen generated. Later stages feature enemies that are more aggressive to the Grimp and attempt to knock it off the plant it is on or cut its silk, slowing down the player's progress to higher levels.

Once the player enters a garden, a "synchronization meter" begins to decrement at a fixed pace. If the meter should fall empty, the mission is considered failed and the player will have to restart the game. Objects referred to as "crystals" can be collected across each garden to refill the meter, including those generated after completing certain chain maneuvers. The meter is also completely refilled when a Spectra is collected. On January 15, 2009, the game was patched to include a "continue" option should the synchronization meter deplete. While choosing to continue will avoid the need to restart one's progress from the beginning, doing so will disable the ability to earn "Garden complete" trophies.

Each garden is visually and audibly centered around a number of colors and minimalist house and techno music. Each garden stage has a total of five Spectra to be collected. When the player first attempts a garden, they are required to collect only one Spectra. Upon revisiting the garden after successfully completing the previous mission, the number of Spectra that are required to complete the mission increase by one. The player is scored for their performance, and once all five Spectra in a garden are obtained, the player can return to try to improve their completion time or score, comparing it against a global high score chart. Not all garden levels are initially available from the start; as the player collects Spectra, new plants on the main screen for the game will grow and will ultimately allow the player to reach the other gardens.

=== Cooperative Play ===
PixelJunk Eden can be played alone or with up to three local players performing cooperatively, each controlling their own Grimp. Players must stay within a certain distance of one another; if any player moves outside of the screen boundaries, a brief timer will appear. Once the timer expires, the offscreen player will respawn next to an onscreen player (as long as the onscreen player is not in midair). While playing cooperatively, Grimps will stick to one another if they collide. Using this mechanic, players may "catch" a falling Grimp or "throw" each other to new heights.

=== Encore ===
In a similar structure to PixelJunk Monsters, Q-Games released an expansion for PixelJunk Eden titled PixelJunk Eden Encore. Released in April 2009, the add-on includes five additional gardens. Some new play elements were also introduced; for instance, the game now implements a "smart bomb" technique whereby opening three seeds in a row, all on-screen enemies will erupt into pollen simultaneously. At the release of Encore, these changes were patched into the original levels as well. The game also introduced new Spider Controls for players who collected all twenty-five spectra in the new version.

== Features ==
PixelJunk Eden is the first game to launch with PlayStation 3 trophy system support at its original release, although other titles had received support via patches prior to this.

Players are able to record video footage of their game performance onto the PlayStation 3's hard drive and then upload these videos to YouTube directly from the console. A maximum of ten minutes can be recorded at a time.

PixelJunk Eden also supports "custom soundtracks", the ability to play music from the PlayStation 3 hard drive as in-game music, as part of the 2.40 system update. This feature can only be accessed after collecting all 50 spectra in the game. Video capture is disabled when custom soundtracks are in use, presumably to avoid copyright issues.

== Reception ==
Reception

Aggregate score
Aggregator	Score	
Aggregator	PC	PS3
Metacritic	81/100	(E.) 86/100; 80/100

Review scores
Publication	Score	
Publication	PC	PS3
Destructoid	9.5/10	9/10
Edge	N/A	7/10
Eurogamer	N/A	7/10
GamePro	N/A	4/5
GameSpot	N/A	7/10
GameTrailers	N/A	8.4/10
GameZone	N/A	(E.) 8.5/10
IGN	N/A	8.4/10
PlayStation Official Magazine – UK	N/A	7/10
PC Gamer (UK)	84%	N/A
The A.V. Club	N/A	B+

PixelJunk Eden and PixelJunk Eden Encore received favorable reviews on both platforms according to the review aggregation website Metacritic. Many praised the PlayStation 3 version's colorful visuals and general gameplay. The controls are considered simple, allowing for the player to learn and explore the game's physics easily in order to become more adept at traversing the gardens. Reviews commented that the experience of the game is difficult to state in words; as stated in 1UP.com's review, "you have to play it in order to fully appreciate it".

Reviews of PixelJunk Eden also share common criticisms. Some critics consider the synchronization meter an unnecessary countdown timer for an experience that is otherwise relaxing. GameSpot called the timer "suffocating", "nightmarish", and "all too demanding" while 1UP.com referred to it as a "nagging tension". Another frequent criticism is aimed at the game's progression structure, which requires the player to visit each garden five times to fully complete it, each subsequent visit becoming more redundant than the previous one.

Eurogamer noted that at times the physics of the game seemed to fluctuate, making it difficult to judge jumps correctly and making for a frustrating experience, but despite the game's flaws, "there is something quite beautiful about PixelJunk Eden", and that "It's just about worth all the confusion, frustration, pretentiousness and frequent tedium."

During 2013's holiday Steam sale Q-Games doubled the income of the PC version of the game.

== Eden Obscura ==
A "reimagining", entitled Eden Obscura, was initially reported in May 2017 to be in production for smartphones. It was released for iOS devices on May 18, 2018, followed by an Android release on June 1, 2018.

== PixelJunk Eden 2 ==
A sequel, PixelJunk Eden 2, was released on December 10, 2020 for Nintendo Switch.

== See also ==
- PixelJunk Racers
