= PixelJunk Shooter 2 =

2011 video game

- PlayStation Store icon
- Developer: Q-Games (Note: Additional work by Santa Monica Studio.)
- Publishers: JP: Q-Games; WW: Sony Computer Entertainment; Ultimate; Double Eleven
- Series: PixelJunk
- Platforms: PlayStation 3, PlayStation 4, PlayStation Vita, Windows
- Release: PS3: NA: March 1, 2011; EU: March 2, 2011; AU/JP: March 3, 2011; PixelJunk Shooter Ultimate; PS4, Vita: NA: June 3, 2014; PAL: June 4, 2014; JP: June 18, 2014; Windows; October 21, 2015
- Genre: Multidirectional shooter
- Modes: Single-player, multiplayer

PixelJunk Shooter 2 is a 2011 multidirectional shooter video game developed by Q-Games for the PlayStation 3. It is the sequel to PixelJunk Shooter and was released on the PlayStation Store worldwide by Sony Computer Entertainment in March 2011. PixelJunk Shooter 2 was formally announced by Q-Games on 18 May 2010. The title is the first sequel to any PixelJunk game. A spin-off based on a bonus stage, PixelJunk SideScroller, was released the same year,

PixelJunk Shooter Ultimate, developed by Double Eleven, combines both games into one continuous game. It was released on PlayStation 4 and PlayStation Vita in June 2014 and for Microsoft Windows in October 2015.

== Reception ==
Reception

Aggregate score
Aggregator	Score
Metacritic	82/100

Review scores
Publication	Score
Destructoid	9.5/10
Edge	8/10
Eurogamer	7/10
GamePro	4.5/5
GameSpot	7.5/10
GamesRadar+	4/5
IGN	8/10
Joystiq	4/5
PlayStation Official Magazine – UK	8/10
PlayStation: The Official Magazine	8/10
Metro	7/10
Wired	7/10

PixelJunk Shooter 2 received "favourable" reviews according to the review aggregation website Metacritic.
