= Hohokum =

2014 art video game developed by Honeyslug

- Developer: Honeyslug (Note: Additional work by Santa Monica Studio.)
- Publishers: Sony Computer Entertainment (PS3, PS4, Vita); Annapurna Interactive (Windows)
- Producer: Zach Wood
- Artist: Richard Hogg
- Platforms: PlayStation 3; PlayStation 4; PlayStation Vita; Microsoft Windows
- Release: PS3, PS4, Vita: NA: August 12, 2014; EU/JP: August 13, 2014; Windows: WW: July 28, 2022
- Genre: Art game
- Mode: Single-player

Hohokum is a 2014 art video game developed by Honeyslug and published by Sony Computer Entertainment for PlayStation 3, PlayStation 4, and PlayStation Vita, and by Annapurna Interactive for Microsoft Windows. The player controls a snake-like creature to explore 17 whimsical worlds with no set objectives. The developers, who began development in 2008, compared the concept to flying a kite and were inspired by free London museums, Portmeirion, and indigenous cultures. It was released on August 12, 2014, and features a soundtrack by Ghostly International artists. The game received "generally favorable reviews", according to video game review score aggregator Metacritic. Critics appreciated the game's presentation, including its art and music, but felt that the gameplay turned to drudgery towards its end and that the objectives were too vague.

== Gameplay ==
Screenshot of gameplay in the Fun Fair level

The player-character is a multicolored serpent creature called the "Long Mover" who glides through whimsical game worlds with loose objectives. There is no correct way to play the game, which was designed to be enjoyed without necessarily pursuing objectives. It is non-linear and has no score, time limit, or tutorial. The developer described the game as about "relaxing in a space and just enjoying the experience and the music, instead of trying to complete it to make progress", and an IGN preview said it is "simply about the beauty of exploring". USgamer's Jeremy Parish wrote that the game's challenges were in distinguishing the interactive objects from the environment and then figuring out the function of those interactive objects. For example, a ball resembling a dandelion releases its spores when circled, but the player has to follow the floating spores to realize that other villagers use the spores as a vehicle. The game communicates with visual and audial cues, and uses few of the standard controller buttons: two buttons slow or accelerate the Long Mover, and the triggers make it wiggle for a boost. The Long Mover changes in color based on the direction it faces and the DualShock 4's light bar matches the color.

The game does not explicitly have a story, but has a narrative line that connects the disparate worlds. There are 17 worlds, each with unique characters, a single primary goal, and secondary activities. In "Lamp Lighting", the player activates lights while flying past silhouettes, and each light adds a new layer of music. The player flies through a series of color-changing circles to access the next world. In Sponge Land, an underwater world, the player gathers fish to swim alongside the Long Mover. The player can collect seeds in the Kite Village. Another level lets the player create shapes in the sky by flying past stars. The worlds are presented in flat colors with no outlines, and all worlds are unlocked from the beginning of the game. The credits roll once a hidden multicolored serpent is freed from each level.

== Development ==
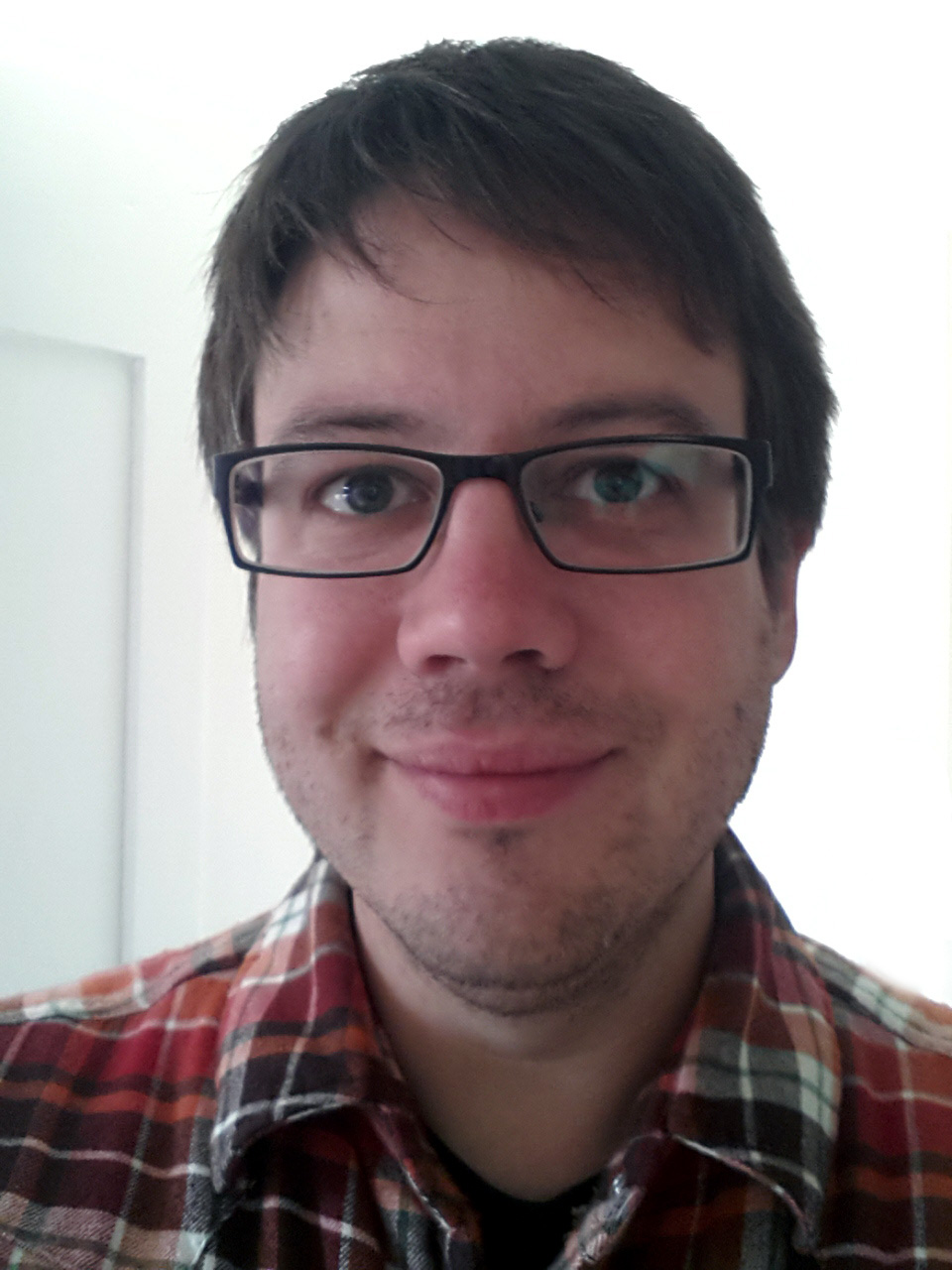
Hohokum developer Ricky Haggett

Hohokum is an art game developed by British game developer Honeyslug in collaboration with artist Richard Hogg and Santa Monica Studio beginning in 2008. Hogg and Honeyslug's Ricky Haggett knew each other through a music connection. The two discussed making a game and began to collaborate when Hogg sent images to Haggett, who was experimenting with Adobe Flash. They prototyped a top-down game similar to Flow as well as a platformer with a jetpack, and a mini-golf game. Their first formal collaboration was an entry for Kokoromi's Gamma event in Montreal. (Note: The Gamma event game was Poto and Cabenga, where two characters were controlled with one button, based on the event's theme of "one button". Haggett approached Hogg about the competition two weeks in advance.) The team's first game ideas for Hohokum were about racing, which grew into the idea of a "stunt kite". They wanted to make a game with the limitations and satisfaction of flying a kite where the conventional aims of video games were absent: no being commanded, avoiding failure, or being challenged to advance. The gameplay was designed to encourage expressive play and experimentation as "a playground, a place to wander about". Santa Monica Studio's lead game designer of external games Seth Killian described that world's nature as "about a feeling and a mood, a mental space". The first pieces of the game were abstract, and the development gradually grew figurative, with people and buildings. In pre-production, Richard Hogg and Ricky Haggett went to free London museums, such as the National Maritime Museum, Natural History Museum, Imperial War Museum, which inspired in-game content like ancient Egyptian tombs. The game's "Fun Fair" level was based on Portmeiron in North Wales, and they were also inspired by the festival costumes of the Selkʼnam people of southern Argentina.

Honeyslug and Hogg entered the game into the Eurogamer Indie Showcase and Independent Games Festival halfway through 2010 and spent two weeks polishing a rough draft. They then put the game on hold for a year starting in 2011 while they developed another game, Frobisher Says. (Note: The team began to plan Frobisher Says at the 2011 Independent Games Festival that they were attending to present Hohokum.) Digital Trends described the other game as containing "the DNA of Hogg's artistic vision for Hohokum". Hogg described the team's working relationship as informal and their decision-making as fully collaborative, particularly in the feel of the game world. For instance, Hogg would give unplanned drawings to Haggett, who would work the art into the game, or Haggett would envision something and ask Haggett to make it "look nice". Hogg was not as involved in the "nitty-gritty of gameplay and puzzle mechanics" due to his skill set. His interest in mixed metaphors and making the familiar seem unfamiliar is one of the game's guiding philosophies. The name of the snakelike Long Mover is a reference to a snake in a skit by British comedy troupe The Mighty Boosh. It was chosen to be purposefully more ambiguous than a specific, existing creature, and to have mythical connotations. The game's title is based on a misspelling of the Hohokam American Southwest archaeological culture.

Honeyslug made a Spotify playlist between 30 and 40 tracks long of ideal "dream" music for the game, including tracks by artists signed to indie record label Ghostly International. Santa Monica Studio used their personal connections with the label to coordinate a partnership. Ghostly's soundtrack partly consists of licensed tracks and partly of original compositions. The music is split into layers and manipulated with the gameplay. Honeyslug also formed a partnership with Santa Monica Studio to be the game's publisher and co-developer.

The game was released for PlayStation 3, PlayStation 4, and PlayStation Vita on August 12, 2014 in North America, and a day later in Europe and Japan. (Note: The Japanese release was originally scheduled for February 2014, but was delayed.) The Vita version uses its touchscreen, and the PlayStation 4 version uses its controller touchpad. Instead of integrating the then-new features of the PlayStation 4's DualShock 4 controller, the team sought to keep the controls simple to keep focus on the "elegance" of the Long Mover. Hohokum was a PlayStation Plus free title for subscribers during May 2015. Honeyslug disbanded in late 2015 for its members to pursue solo careers. Hohokum released for Microsoft Windows on July 28, 2022, published by Annapurna Interactive.

== Reception ==
Destructoid's Jordan Devore called Hohokum the "most relaxing game" of E3 2013, and one of his favorites of the show. Polygon selected the game as an E3 2013 Editor's Choice. Jeremy Parish of USgamer thought the game was the most intriguing PlayStation 4 title at the 2013 Tokyo Game Show and praised Sony for highlighting the "decidedly arty" game alongside the console's blockbuster launch titles. He compared the game to a low-stress puzzle in the same design vein of Flower and PixelJunk. Kotaku called the game both the "most confusing game" at E3 2013 and "the weirdest" on the PlayStation 4.

Reception

Aggregate scores
Aggregator	Score
GameRankings	75%
Metacritic	75/100

Review scores
Publication	Score
Game Informer	6/10
GameSpot	7/10
IGN	8.8/10
Polygon	6/10
Hardcore Gamer	3.5/5

The game received "generally favorable reviews", according to video game review score aggregator Metacritic. Critics appreciated the game's presentation, including its art and music, but felt that the gameplay turned to drudgery towards its end and that the objectives were too vague. Multiple reviewers also felt the game would make a good screen saver.

Matt Helgeson of Game Informer thought the game "lacked depth" and considered it evidence of how "games that wear their indie aesthetic on their sleeve" could, like AAA games, be "all flash and no substance". He cited the game's "oddball, ... colorful and charming" visuals, "tasteful" and "hip" Ghostly International soundtrack, and experimental gameplay as characteristic of the indie aesthetic, and wrote that despite its "whimsy" and "weirdness", the game did not appear to "have a point". He wished the game was either more structured or experimental. Polygon's Philip Kollar similarly felt that the game was "beautiful but shallow".

Matt Whittaker of Hardcore Gamer described the art style as a cross between Yo Gabba Gabba! and Sound Shapes and wrote that it was designed for simultaneous "sensory overload and hypnotizing lack of substance". He said that the game was "too strange and quirky" to be "gorgeous", but otherwise beautiful. Josiah Renaudin of GameSpot similarly appreciated its creativity. Whittaker also praised the soundtrack as one of the game's best parts, and thought it to be among the best game soundtracks of the year. He felt that the game did not make the transition "from playground to amusement park". While he found Hohokum fun and relaxing, he thought it lacked the special element that distinguished Flower, Journey, and Proteus from "ambiguous art-heavy experiences". Game Informer's Helgeson said that the game was more conventional than he expected, with "simple and uncreative" puzzle-solving and an elephant boss battle.

During the 18th Annual D.I.C.E. Awards, the Academy of Interactive Arts & Sciences nominated Hohokum for the "D.I.C.E. Sprite Award".
