= Bound (video game) =

2016 video game

- Developer: Plastic (Note: Additional work by Santa Monica Studio.)
- Publisher: Sony Interactive Entertainment
- Composer: Oleg Shpudeiko
- Platform: PlayStation 4
- Release: August 16, 2016
- Genre: Platform
- Mode: Single-player

Bound is a 2016 platform video game developed by Plastic and published by Sony Interactive Entertainment for the PlayStation 4.

The game received mostly positive reviews, with critics praising its art style and originality, but the gameplay was criticized as shallow.

== Gameplay ==
Gameplay showing the princess navigating a narrow beam

The player controls an unnamed princess and ballet dancer as she makes her way through surreal, dreamlike environments. She must complete platforming challenges and has the ability to repel enemies with her dancing.

The game uses an "Edge Guard" to prevent the player from falling off certain platforms. This was because the developer believed that being able to fall off detracted from the game experience by forcing players to pay closer attention to the character's legs than to the world. There are some places where the princess can fall and die, but she will respawn nearby.

== Plot ==
The game takes place inside the mind of a pregnant woman who is revisiting her childhood home and memories. In the woman's mind world, the main character is a Princess who is following the orders of her mother, the Queen, to vanquish a monster that is destroying the world. According to the game's creative director, "everything in the game is a big metaphor", and there are scenes in the game that show real life and not the game's world.

== Development ==
Bound was developed by Plastic, a Polish former demogroup who previously worked with Sony on Linger in Shadows and Datura. It was the third and final collaboration between these two companies, as Sony's Santa Monica Studio stopped assisting on other independent projects to focus on the God of War series, while core members of Plastic was hired by Epic Games from 2022 to 2024.

The creative director of Bound, Michal Staniszewski, said that the game took three and a half years to develop. The game was designed to be best played in a single sitting, and he suggested that investigating too much of the game before playing it would cause the experience to be spoiled, comparing it to the games Journey and Firewatch.

Inspiration for the game's idea also came from the game Ico. The game was directed at a target audience of older gamers who have been playing games "their whole life" and are tired of solving puzzles, instead simply wanting an audiovisual experience without frustrating or repetitive gameplay. However, the developers still wanted to include some challenge to the game, so that it was not simply a walking simulator. It was meant to be a short experience as the creative director noted that, like other adults, he lacked the time to play larger, 100-hour games such as The Witcher 3.

The game's aesthetics were largely inspired by modern art and its development from the beginning of the 20th century. The game developer Tale of Tales was also cited as an influence in the design of the game, as well as the digital art of the demoscene.

The idea of a dancing main character was not added from the beginning of development. Rather, after one and a half years in development, the developers were disappointed with how similar to a typical game character her movements looked, and were inspired by a video of a modern jazz dance to change their movements to those of a dancer. Motion capture was used on the dancer Maria Udod, who was chosen due to her experience both in ballet and contemporary dance, in order to record her movements for use by the protagonist. Her choreographer was Michał Adam Góral. Every animation of the character was changed to a dance move.

The game's developers were forced to sacrifice visual effects for performance, because they did not want the game to run with motion blur or framerate drops, due to the hardware limitations of the PlayStation 4. The game runs at a stable 60 frames per second (FPS), and Staniszewski believes that games that run at lower FPS than 60 are not the "proper way that games should look on TVs".

On October 13, 2016, Plastic released a patch that enabled PlayStation VR compatibility. Later, on November 10, 2016, another patch was published, enabling PlayStation 4 Pro support, including 4K resolution and increased pixel density in VR mode.

== Reception ==
Reception

Aggregate score
Aggregator	Score
Metacritic	71/100

Review scores
Publication	Score
Destructoid	6/10
Edge	8/10
Electronic Gaming Monthly	7/10
Game Informer	7.75/10
GameRevolution	8/10
GameSpot	7/10
Hardcore Gamer	3.5/5
IGN	7/10
Polygon	7.5/10
Push Square	6/10
Digital Spy	3.5/5
Slant Magazine	3.5/5

Bound received "mixed or average reviews" according to the review aggregation website Metacritic. Chris Carter of Destructoid said that its graphics are "gorgeous" and "stunning", but calling the movement "stiff" and combat too easy, believing the game leans "too hard" on the platforming aspect. Matt Peckham of Time said that while the game is fun to watch, it is boring to play because it is so easy to navigate the world. James Stephanie Sterling of The Jimquisition said that, while beautiful, playing it is a "messy, obstructive hassle" with poor controls and camera movement, as it is unable to commit to either being a walking simulator or a fully realized puzzle platformer and is instead a hybrid of both.

Justin Clark of GameSpot said that while its gameplay is "rudimentary", this is made up for by the graphical details of the game, calling each stage a "cubist marvel" and the idea of a dancing main character deserving of praise and saying that it "displays immense amounts of contemplation and ambition in every aspect except gameplay". He claimed that "[to] decry it for its overly simplistic mechanics is to ultimately miss the forest for the trees", and that "Bound is digital art installation" whose full impact is only evident in its final moments.

Stuart Andrews of Digital Spy gave it three-and-a-half stars out of five, saying, "This isn't quite the indie, arthouse Ratchet & Clank, then, but it's distinctive, unusual and frequently inspired." Aaron Riccio of Slant Magazine gave it a similar score of three-and-a-half stars out of five, saying, "Movement here isn't just treated as a necessity of the gameplay, but as an expression of joy and healing." However, David Wolinsky of Common Sense Media gave it one star out of five, saying, "If the game is about exploration, it doesn't matter because you can go in any direction and there's nothing it necessarily offers you. So the beauty is in the eye of the beholder here, which means it's worth a look but [it] doesn't have much to say beyond that."

The game was selected to appear in IndieCade 2016.
