= PixelJunk Shooter =

2009 video game

- PlayStation Store icon
- Developers: Q-Games (Note: Additional work by Santa Monica Studio.); Ultimate; Double Eleven
- Publishers: JP: Q-Games; WW: Sony Computer Entertainment; Ultimate; Double Eleven
- Composers: High Frequency Bandwidth; Alex Paterson; Dom Beken
- Series: PixelJunk
- Platforms: PlayStation 3, Microsoft Windows, Mac OS X, Linux, PlayStation 4, PlayStation Vita
- Release: PlayStation 3: WW: December 10, 2009; JP: December 24, 2009; Microsoft Windows, OS X, Linux; November 11, 2013; PixelJunk Shooter Ultimate; PlayStation 4, PlayStation Vita: NA: June 3, 2014; PAL: June 4, 2014; JP: June 18, 2014; Windows; October 21, 2015
- Genre: Multidirectional shooter
- Modes: Single-player, multiplayer

PixelJunk Shooter is a shooter video game developed and published by Q-Games for the PlayStation 3. It is the fourth game in the PixelJunk series. It was released on the PlayStation Store by Sony Computer Entertainment in December 2009, and for Windows on November 11, 2013. A remastered version of the game, PixelJunk Shooter Ultimate, was released by Double Eleven for the PlayStation 4 and PlayStation Vita in June 2014, and for Microsoft Windows on October 21, 2015.

== Gameplay ==
In PixelJunk Shooter, up to two players can control their own subterranean vehicles to rescue a number of surviving scientists trapped underground. Using their ships' missiles, players can defeat enemies and destroy weak rock to progress through the environment. In addition to rock and ice, players must manipulate three types of fluid (water, magma, and ferrofluid) in order to reach the survivors. Once each survivor is rescued or killed, players may progress to the next part of the stage. If too many survivors are killed, players are forced to quit or restart the stage. The game has fifteen stages divided evenly among three "episodes", each episode ending with a boss encounter.

== Development ==
PixelJunk Shooter was formally announced during a 2009 pre-E3 press event on April 29, 2009. Originally referred to as PixelJunk 1–4, a 13-day contest was held in which fans submitted game title suggestions to Q-Games. The official title, PixelJunk Shooter, was announced on May 25, 2009. The simplistic name was received negatively by some fans to which Q-Games president Dylan Cuthbert explained that the name was chosen not only for its simplicity, but also because shooting is the game's central mechanic ("Shooting jets of magma, shooting streams of water, shooting enemies, missiles, lasers, plasma spread weapons etc.") Several other titles were considered, including "PixelJunk Elements", the most popular submission. Ultimately, "Elements" was dismissed because "[it didn't] sound action-packed enough". The fluid mechanics are based on a particle flow simulation calculated using the Cell's Synergistic Processing Element or SPE.

PixelJunk Shooter is the first title in the PixelJunk series to offer a traditional narrative, conveyed to players through a series of speech boxes awarded upon rescuing certain survivors. The game's soundtrack is made up of songs by High Frequency Bandwidth, composed by Alex Paterson and Dom Beken.

== Reception ==
PixelJunk Shooter

Aggregate score
Aggregator	Score	
Aggregator	PC	PS3
Metacritic	73/100	87/100

Review scores
Publication	Score	
Publication	PC	PS3
Destructoid	N/A	8.5/10
Edge	N/A	8/10
Eurogamer	N/A	8/10
Game Informer	N/A	8.5/10
GamesMaster	N/A	89%
GameSpot	N/A	8/10
GameSpy	N/A	4/5
GameTrailers	N/A	8.7/10
Giant Bomb	N/A	4/5
IGN	N/A	9.1/10
PlayStation Official Magazine – UK	N/A	9/10
PC PowerPlay	7/10	N/A
PCGamesN	8/10	N/A
The A.V. Club	N/A	B
Teletext GameCentral	N/A	8/10

The PlayStation 3 version of PixelJunk Shooter received "generally favorable reviews", just three points shy of "universal acclaim", while the PC version received "average" reviews, according to the review aggregation website Metacritic. The former console version was described by Eurogamer as "part retro videogame, part chemistry set; part Geometry Wars, part Zelda", while Game Informer called it "one of the best titles you'll find on PlayStation Network". Similarly, IGN's review called it one of the best PlayStation Network titles of 2009, as well as Q Games' "best work yet".

The same console version was praised by critics for its level design and unique physics; 1UP.com lamented that said console version did not include a "sandbox" mode wherein players could experiment with its various fluid substances. The music of High Frequency Bandwidth was also praised, described as "a funky, dynamic collection of upbeat trip-hop" by Eurogamer.

Critics were not uniform in reception of the same console version's combat. While Eurogamer praised the enemies as "cunningly-designed", GameSpy remarked that the combat experience overall "isn't all that interesting".

Several reviews made note of said console version's brevity; GameSpot called it "ultimately too short for its own good, abruptly ending just when you're getting into a groove". Other reviewers were less critical of its length, noting that the story concludes with a "To Be Continued" screen, suggesting an "Encore" expansion was likely (similar to those released for PixelJunk Monsters and PixelJunk Eden). Rather than an expansion, a standalone sequel was announced by Q-Games.

== Legacy ==
The PixelJunk Shooter space in PlayStation Home is a 3D representation of elements seen in the 2D game. In the foreground are two Home avatars wearing scientist uniforms unlocked by playing PixelJunk Shooter.

A PlayStation Home space for PixelJunk Shooter was added onto the existing Q Games "PixelJunk Museum" space on December 17, 2009. Upon entering the Museum, players receive articles of clothing unlocked by completing portions of PixelJunk Shooter. Completing the game 100% will unlock a complete scientist costume for players to equip their Home avatars with. The Home space features the virtual interior of the "Ers Piñita Colada", a space center seen in the main menu for PixelJunk Shooter.

=== PixelJunk Shooter 2 ===
PixelJunk Shooter 2 was formally announced by Q-Games on May 18, 2010. The title is the first full-fledged sequel to any PixelJunk game. Q-Games' Dylan Cuthbert said of the title, "it will have some features that are new to the PixelJunk series in general and will be bigger than the first game."

=== PixelJunk Shooter Ultimate ===
PixelJunk Shooter Ultimate, developed by Double Eleven, combines both games into one continuous game. It was released on PlayStation 4 and PlayStation Vita in June 2014 and on the PC in October 2015 and was later released as a free title for PlayStation Plus subscribers for the month of June 2014. The title features cross-buy, meaning that one purchase grants access to both PS4 and PS Vita versions as well as cross-save, meaning that players can save progress on either PlayStation 4 or PlayStation Vita and continue on the other system.

==== Reception ====
PixelJunk Shooter Ultimate

Aggregate score
Aggregator	Score
Metacritic	(Vita) 87/100 (PS4) 82/100

Review scores
Publication	Score
GameRevolution	(Vita) 4/5
GamesMaster	(PS4) 81%
IGN	(PS4) 8/10

The Vita and PlayStation 4 versions of Ultimate received "generally favorable reviews", according to Metacritic.

== See also ==
- Sub-Terrania
- Oids
