= Enda Bowe =

Irish photographer

Enda Bowe is an Irish photographer that lives and works in Ireland . His publications include Kilburn Cherry (2013) and At Mirrored River (2016). Bowe was joint winner of the SOLAS Ireland award in 2015 and won second prize in the 2018 and 2019 Taylor Wessing Photographic Portrait Prize. He has had solo exhibitions internationally.

== Work ==
Kilburn Cherry is a collection of photographs of cherry blossoms in Kilburn, London, traditionally the home of the Irish diaspora. The work was inspired by Japanese renku poetry. Bowe has said the "bold appearance of the cherry blossom seemed to play with ideas of hopefulness and revival".

At Mirrored River was made over four years in an unspecified Irish midlands town. It contains portraits of young people at a point of transition to adulthood, depicted in their home setting of housing estates, supermarkets and social functions, juxtaposed with images of the town and its surrounding landscape.

== Publications ==
=== Publications by Bowe ===
- Kilburn Cherry. Includes a poem by Don Paterson ("Renku: My Last Thirty-Five Deaths").
  - First edition. London: Jane & Jeremy, 2013. Edition of 100 copies.
  - Second edition. London: Jane & Jeremy, 2016. Edition of 100 copies.
- At Mirrored River. Blue Swallow, 2016. ISBN 978-3902993304. Includes a poem by John Glenday ("The River") and a short story by Lucy Caldwell ("Days"). Edition of 800 copies.
- This Thing I Want. I Know Not What. Paper Tiger, 2018.

=== Zines by Bowe ===
- Me and My Friends. Issue 4. Nicole Bachmann.

== Awards ==
- 2015: One of 7 joint winners, SOLAS Ireland award, Source and Gallery of Photography, for At Mirrored River. The other winners were Ciarán Óg Arnold, Eamonn Doyle, Emer Gillespie, Shane Lynam, Dara McGrath and Yvette Monahan.
- 2018: Second prize, Taylor Wessing Photographic Portrait Prize, National Portrait Gallery, London for "Cybil McAddy with daughter Lulu"
- 2019: Second prize, Taylor Wessing Photographic Portrait Prize, National Portrait Gallery, London for "Neil", a portrait from a series exploring youth culture on either side of the Belfast peace lines
- 2019: First Prize, Zurich Portrait Prize, National Gallery of Ireland

== Exhibitions ==
=== Solo exhibitions ===
- At Mirrored River, Visual Centre of Contemporary Art Carlow, Carlow, Ireland, 2016 as part of PhotoIreland Festival.
- At Mirrored River, The Library Project, Dublin, 2018 as part of PhotoIreland Festival.

=== Group exhibitions ===
- "Samantha Nolan" in Taylor Wessing Photographic Portrait Prize, National Portrait Gallery, London, 2010.
- Plat(t)form, Fotomuseum Winterthur, Winterthur, Switzerland, 2011.
- SOLAS Photography Award Winners, Gallery of Photography, Dublin, 2015. Work from At Mirrored River.
- Taylor Wessing Photographic Portrait Prize, National Portrait Gallery, London, 2018.
- Taylor Wessing Photographic Portrait Prize, National Portrait Gallery, London, 2019.
