= Santa Monica Studio =

American video game developer

- Logo used since 2014
- Type: Subsidiary
- Industry: Video games
- Founded: 1999; 27 years ago in Santa Monica, California, US
- Founder: Allan Becker
- Headquarters: Los Angeles, US
- Key people: Yumi Yang (studio head); Cory Barlog (head of creative)
- Products: God of War series
- Number of employees: 250+ (2024)
- Parent: Sony Computer Entertainment (1999–2005); PlayStation Studios (2005–present)
- Website: sms.playstation.com

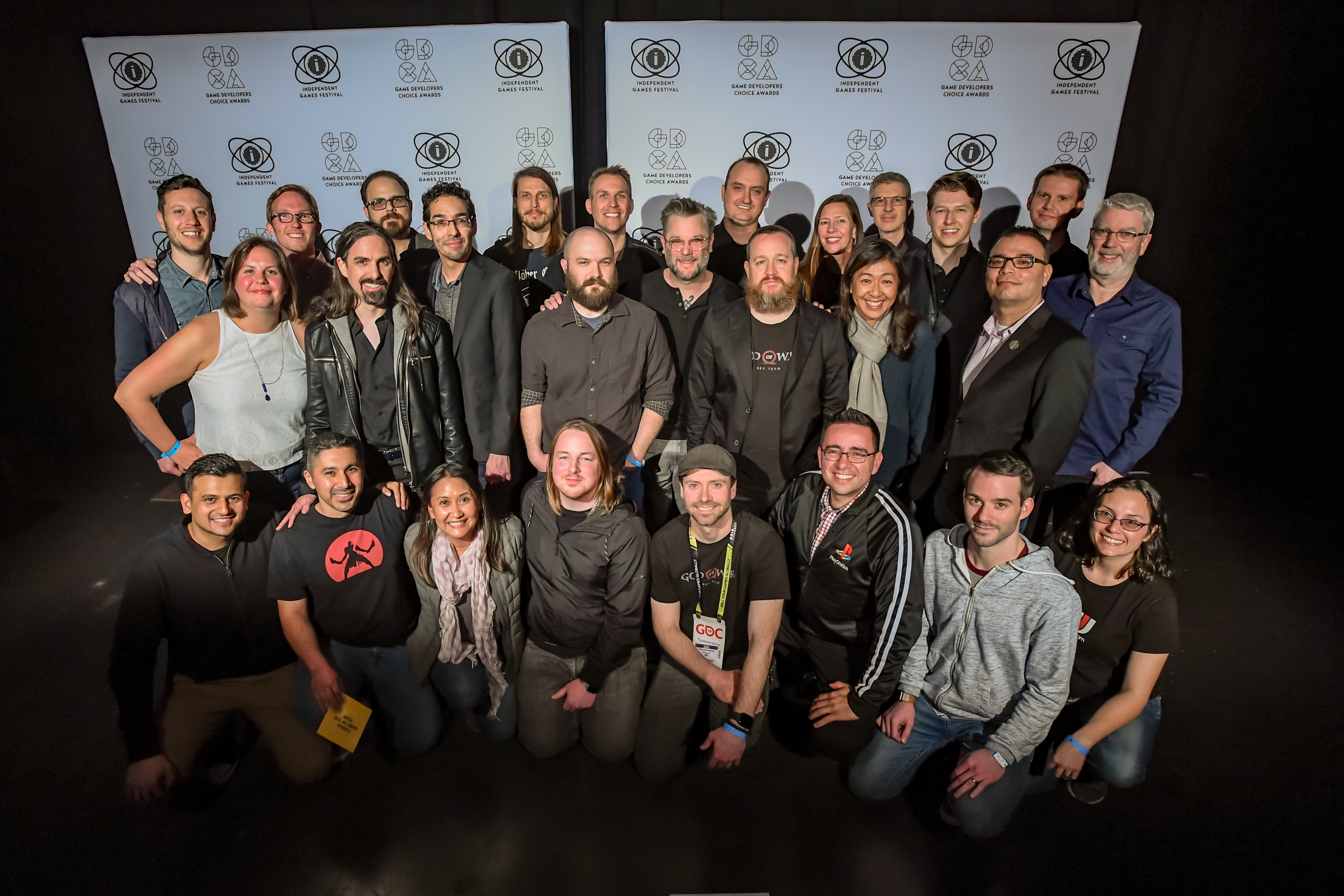
The Santa Monica Studio at the 2019 Game Developers Choice Awards

Santa Monica Studio (formerly known as SCEA SM Studio) is an American video game developer of Sony Interactive Entertainment based in Los Angeles. It is best known for developing the God of War series. The studio was founded in 1999 by Allan Becker and was located in Santa Monica, California, until relocating to Playa Vista in 2014.

A separate External Development group acted as both a video game publisher and business incubator for indie game studios, including Thatgamecompany and its game Journey. Other incubated teams include Broodworks, Eat Sleep Play, Fun Bits, Giant Sparrow, Incognito Entertainment, Q-Games, and Ready at Dawn.

== History ==
Santa Monica Studio was established in 1999 by Allan Becker, a long-time Sony employee who wanted "to break out of the corporate Foster City group" of Sony Computer Entertainment. The studio was initially an office of 989 Studios for the developers of the Twisted Metal and Jet Moto series, referred to as "the Santa Monica studio". This office was next to the developer Naughty Dog before moving into a brick building in the suburbs of Santa Monica, California. The building at Penn Station would be occupied for fifteen years.

For its first game, the racing title Kinetica, Santa Monica Studio decided to skip the PlayStation console and built the game for the console's then-upcoming successor, the PlayStation 2, instead. A game engine was developed "to give the [PlayStation 2] some legs" for Kinetica and future releases. While the game was developed during the studio's team building phase, producer Shannon Studstill focused on the game's release to prove to Sony that Santa Monica Studio was capable of delivering a product on schedule and within budget. Kinetica was released on time in 2001, with the studio staying under the allocated budget. After publication, Santa Monica Studio shifted to its next project, God of War, while re-using the engine from Kinetica.

Becker left Santa Monica Studio in 2011. By March 2012, Becker had joined Sony's Japan Studio, while Shannon became Santa Monica Studio's "Senior Director of Product Development". In January 2014, Santa Monica Studio announced that it would move from their Penn Station offices to The Reserve, a 20-acre facility on Jefferson Boulevard in Playa Vista, Los Angeles. The 30,000 square feet (2,800 m^{2}) of office space were "four or five times the size" of their previous Santa Monica office, according to Studstill. At the time, the studio employed roughly 240 people. An undisclosed numbers of staffers were laid off in February that year due to the cancelation of a new intellectual property, including Stig Asmussen, who headed the canceled project. The studio relocation was completed on July 22, 2014, coupled with a new logo, dubbed SMS "Vanguard". Santa Monica Studio would also close down its External Development group in 2016 and sold the rights to What Remains of Edith Finch and Wattam back to their developers, as well as publishing rights to Annapurna Interactive where the group's employees had relocated.

In March 2020, Studstill left Santa Monica Studio to lead a new development studio under Stadia. Subsequently, a long-time employee and previous director of product development for Santa Monica Studio, Yumi Yang, was installed as the developer's studio head.

== Games developed ==
Year	Title	Platform(s)
2001	Kinetica	PlayStation 2
2005	God of War	PlayStation 2, PlayStation 3, PlayStation Vita
2007	God of War II	PlayStation 2, PlayStation 3, PlayStation Vita
2010	God of War III	PlayStation 3, PlayStation 4
2013	God of War: Ascension	PlayStation 3
2018	God of War	PlayStation 4, Windows
2022	God of War Ragnarök	PlayStation 4, PlayStation 5, Windows
2026	God of War Sons of Sparta (Note: Co-developed with Mega Cat Studios)	PlayStation 5
2027	God of War Laufey	PlayStation 5
TBA	God of War Trilogy Remake	PlayStation 5

== Development support ==
Year	Title	Developer
2001	Twisted Metal: Black	Incog Inc. Entertainment
2001	Twisted Metal: Small Brawl	Incog Inc. Entertainment
2002	Twisted Metal Black: Online	Incog Inc. Entertainment
2003	War of the Monsters	Incog Inc. Entertainment
2003	Downhill Domination	Incog Inc. Entertainment
2005	The Con	Think & Feel
2005	Twisted Metal: Head-On	Incognito Entertainment
2005	Neopets: The Darkest Faerie	Idol Minds
2006	Blast Factor	Bluepoint Games
2007	Flow	Thatgamecompany
2007	Calling All Cars!	Incognito Entertainment
2007	Warhawk	Incognito Entertainment
2007	PixelJunk Racers	Q-Games
2007	Everyday Shooter	Queasy Games
2008	PixelJunk Monsters	Q-Games
2008	Twisted Metal Head-On: Extra Twisted Edition	Eat Sleep Play
2008	God of War: Chains of Olympus	Ready at Dawn
2008	PixelJunk Monsters Encore	Q-Games
2008	PixelJunk Eden	Q-Games
2008	Linger in Shadows	Plastic
2009	Flower	Thatgamecompany
2009	PixelJunk Eden Encore	Q-Games
2009	Fat Princess	Titan Studios
2009	PixelJunk Monsters Deluxe	Q-Games
2009	.detuned	Farbrausch
2009	God of War Collection	Bluepoint Games
2009	PixelJunk Shooter	Q-Games
2010	Fat Princess: Fistful of Cake	Super Villain Studios
2010	PixelJunk Racers 2nd Lap	Q-Games
2010	God of War: Ghost of Sparta	Ready at Dawn
2011	PixelJunk Shooter 2	Q-Games
2011	PixelJunk SideScroller	Q-Games
2011	God of War: Origins Collection	Ready at Dawn
2011	Carnival Island	Magic Pixel Games
2012	Twisted Metal	Eat Sleep Play
2012	Escape Plan	Fun Bits
2012	Journey	Thatgamecompany
2012	Starhawk	LightBox Interactive
2012	Datura	Plastic
2012	PixelJunk 4am	Q-Games
2012	Sorcery	The Workshop
2012	Sound Shapes	Queasy Games
2012	The Unfinished Swan	Giant Sparrow
2012	PlayStation All-Stars Battle Royale	SuperBot Entertainment
2014	Hohokum	Honeyslug
2015	Fat Princess: Piece of Cake	One Loop Games
2015	God of War III Remastered	Wholesale Algorithms
2015	The Order: 1886	Ready at Dawn
2015	Everybody's Gone to the Rapture	The Chinese Room
2015	Fat Princess Adventures	Fun Bits
2016	Bound	Plastic
2016	Here They Lie	Tangentlemen
