= Fat Princess Adventures =

2015 video game

- Developer: Fun Bits Interactive (Note: Additional work by Santa Monica Studio.)
- Publisher: Sony Computer Entertainment
- Engine: C4 Engine
- Platform: PlayStation 4
- Release: December 5, 2015
- Genre: Action role-playing
- Modes: Single-player, multiplayer

Fat Princess Adventures is an action role-playing video game developed by Fun Bits Interactive and published by Sony Computer Entertainment for PlayStation 4. It is a sequel to Fat Princess. It was released in North America and Europe on December 5, 2015.

== Gameplay ==
Unlike its predecessor, Fat Princess Adventures is a 4-player, co-op hack-and-slash dungeon crawler. Players can switch between four character classes at any time, Warrior, Mage, Archer, and Engineer, each with their own unique abilities and progression paths. At certain points within the game, the princesses serve as non-playable guides to the players, assisting with magic attacks, healing spells, and turning enemies into cake.

== Reception ==
Reception

Aggregate scores
Aggregator	Score
GameRankings	66.67%
Metacritic	66/100

Review scores
Publication	Score
Destructoid	7/10
Hardcore Gamer	4/5

Fat Princess Adventures has received mixed reviews from critics, scoring 66 out of 100 on Metacritic, and 66.67% on GameRankings.

Mark Steighner of Hardcore Gamer gave the game a 4 out of 5: "Fat Princess was subversive, politically incorrect and unexpectedly complex in its strategy and depth. Fat Princess Adventures trades a little of that depth for a more straightforward, action RPG-focused design". Chris Carter from Destructoid rated the game a 7/10: "Fat Princess Adventures is an enjoyable distraction for hardcore fans of the hack-and-slash genre, but now I just want a proper new Princess game".
