= PixelJunk SideScroller =

2011 video game

- PlayStation Store icon
- Developer(s): Q-Games (Note: Additional work by Santa Monica Studio.)
- Publisher(s): JP: Q-Games; WW: Sony Computer Entertainment
- Series: PixelJunk
- Platform(s): PlayStation 3
- Release: NA: October 25, 2011; EU: October 26, 2011; AU: November 2, 2011; JP: November 10, 2011
- Genre(s): Scrolling shooter
- Mode(s): Single-player, multiplayer

PixelJunk SideScroller is a 2011 scrolling shooter video game developed by Q-Games for the PlayStation 3. It is part of the PixelJunk series and was released internationally by Sony Computer Entertainment. The visuals are intended to resemble arcade video games with a vector monitor. It is based on the "Road to Dawn" bonus stage in PixelJunk Shooter 2.

== Reception ==
Reception

Aggregate score
Aggregator	Score
Metacritic	76/100

Review scores
Publication	Score
1Up.com	A−
Destructoid	9/10
Edge	8/10
Game Informer	7.75/10
GamesMaster	83%
GameSpot	6/10
GameTrailers	6.7/10
IGN	6.5/10
PlayStation Official Magazine – UK	7/10
PlayStation: The Official Magazine	8/10
The A.V. Club	C+

PixelJunk SideScroller received "generally favourable reviews" according to the review aggregation website Metacritic.
