= PixelJunk 4am =

2012 music video game

- Developer: Q-Games (Note: Additional work by Santa Monica Studio.)
- Publishers: JP: Q-Games; WW: Sony Computer Entertainment
- Composer: Baiyon
- Series: PixelJunk
- Platform: PlayStation 3 (PlayStation Network)
- Release: NA: May 15, 2012; PAL: May 16, 2012; JP: June 5, 2012
- Genre: Music

PixelJunk 4am, formerly called PixelJunk Lifelike, is a music video game developed by Q-Games for the PlayStation 3. It is an installment in the PixelJunk series and the last to be a collaboration with Sony Computer Entertainment. PixelJunk 4am makes use of the PlayStation Move controller to visualize included music (by Baiyon) and users' own music. The first trailer was released in September 2010.

== Reception ==
Reception

Aggregate score
Aggregator	Score
Metacritic	63/100

Review scores
Publication	Score
Eurogamer	6/10
GameRevolution	3.5/5
GamesMaster	88%
Hyper	5/10
PlayStation Official Magazine – Australia	5/10
PlayStation Official Magazine – UK	7/10
Play	40%
PlayStation: The Official Magazine	7/10

PixelJunk 4am received "mixed" reviews according to the review aggregation website Metacritic.
