= Starship Defense =

2009 video game

- Developer: Q-Games
- Publisher: Nintendo
- Platform: Nintendo DSi
- Release: EU: December 18, 2009; NA: January 18, 2010; JP: February 10, 2010
- Genres: Strategy; Tower defense
- Mode: Single-player

Starship Defense, released in PAL territories as Starship Patrol and Star Ship Defender in Japan, is a tower defense video game developed by Q-Games and published by Nintendo for the Nintendo DSi's DSiWare service.

== Gameplay ==
Similar to other games of the tower-defense genre, the player must defend a fleet of starships against alien attackers by strategically placing turrets and other defensive mechanisms. The player may make use of certain power-ups and bonuses, but is also rewarded for not using them. The game has 30 stages (or levels) of increasing difficulties, each featuring different structures to be defended. As with other games developed by Q Games for the DSi platform, the game has minimal styling, with the graphics being styled to appear like mathematical graph-paper.

The games differs from others in the tower defense genre in that the avenue of attack of the enemies varies significantly during the game, though the player is warned about the direction each attack will come from by dotted lines appearing on-screen. The player is allowed to adjust the aiming-zones of their weaponry during attacks to adapt to them.

== Reception ==
Reviewing the game for Nintendo Life, Marcel van Duyn game the game a positive score of 8/10. Van Duyn praised especially the art-style and called it "a game you should definitely consider picking up if you have the slightest bit of interest in the tower defence genre", though they criticised the music saying that it was "a bit low-key and won't really impress". Simon Parkin reviewing the game for the Eurogamer website also reviewed the game positively, describing it as "contemporary and stylish despite its obvious thriftiness" though also "a fairly orthodox Tower Defence game". Edge magazine also reviewed the game positively, stating that it was "as good as you'll find on DSiWare at the moment". Reviewing for IGN, Daemon Hatfield described it as "the best tower defense game on DSiWare". Matthew Blundon of Nintendo World Report gave the game a 9/10 score, praising its fresh and appealing gameplay, though he noted the bland visual style to be a negative.

The game was subsequently included in the 2010 book 1001 Video Games You Must Play Before You Die which described the graphics as "achingly lo-fi" and the game as a whole as a "rare work of craft".
