= Baiyon =

Japanese multimedia artist from Kyoto

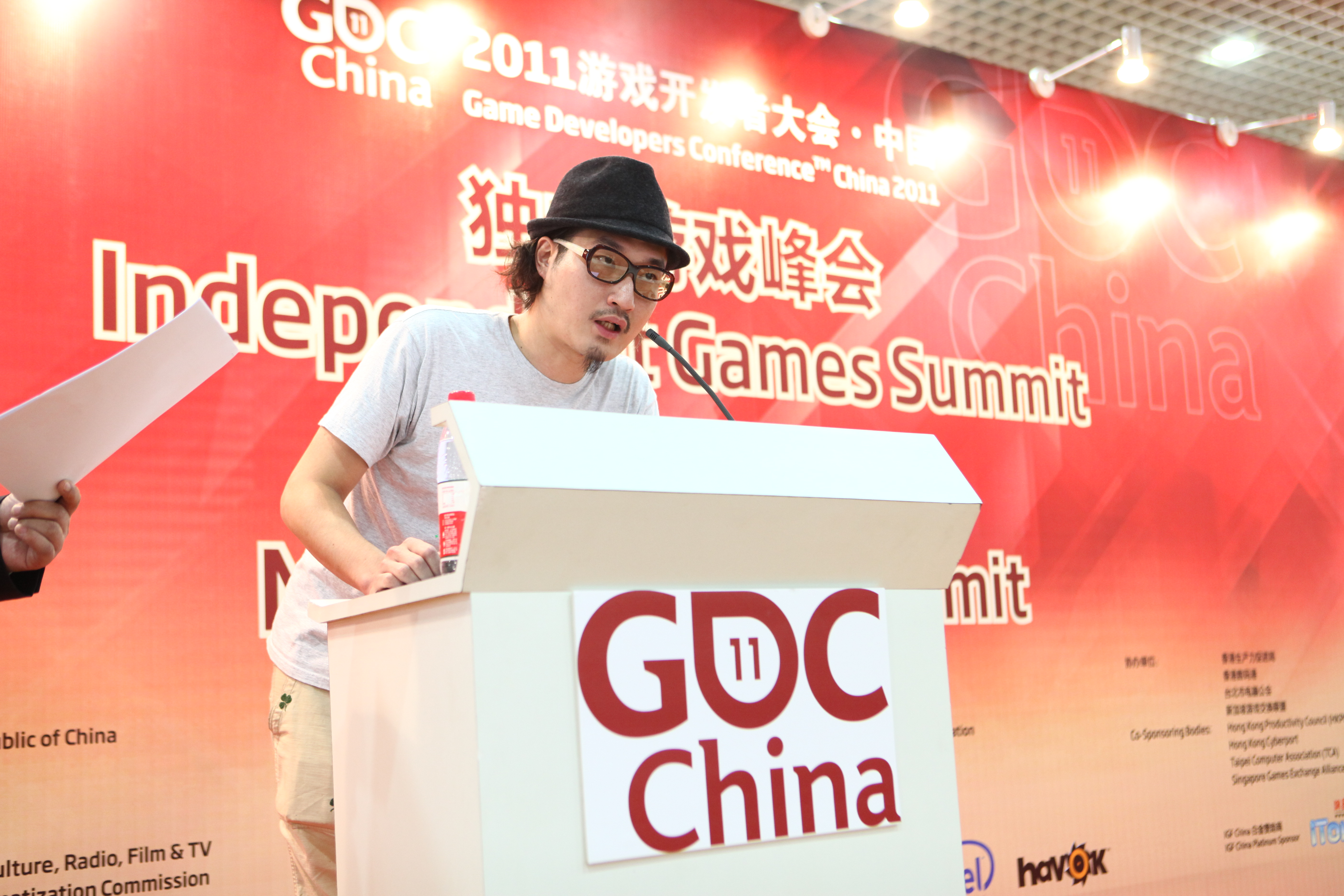
- Baiyon at the Game Developers Conference China 2011

Background information
- Also known as: Wet Side
- Born: Tomohisa Kuramitsu
- Origin: Japan
- Genres: Electronic; dance; techno; house
- Years active: 2004–present
- Website: baiyon.com

Tomohisa Kuramitsu, better known by his stage name Baiyon, is a Japanese multimedia artist from Kyoto. Baiyon uses graphical design and music in combination.

In 1998, he began painting and making music, and later founded the Brain Escape Sandwich Recordings label. As a visual artist, Kuramitsu went by the name Wet Side and applied worked with posters, clothing, and copyright-free graphics.

== History ==
- 2004 - Involved in the production of documentary "moog", charged with the opening, and sections of the closing, theme
- 2005 - Live painting at Aichi Expo
- 2006 - Released first Album Like a school on lunch time (also available on 7-inch EP)
- 2007 - Took part in Stop Rokkasho Project
- 2008 - Released "Goshoguruma EP" through WC Recordings
- 2008 - Released "S Soup EP" through Irish label D1 Recordings.
- 2011 - helped with Media Molecule to make a soundtrack for LittleBigPlanet 2

Baiyon created the graphics and composed the background music for the PlayStation Network game PixelJunk Eden. PixelJunk Eden has since been released for PC through Valve's digital distribution platform, Steam. The game's soundtrack, created by Baiyon, is available alone or bundled with the game. The soundtrack includes his music from the original game and the "Encore" expansion.

He was the musical director for the PlayStation Network game PixelJunk 4am, released in May 2012.
