= Q-Games =

Japanese video game developer

Q-Games, Limited
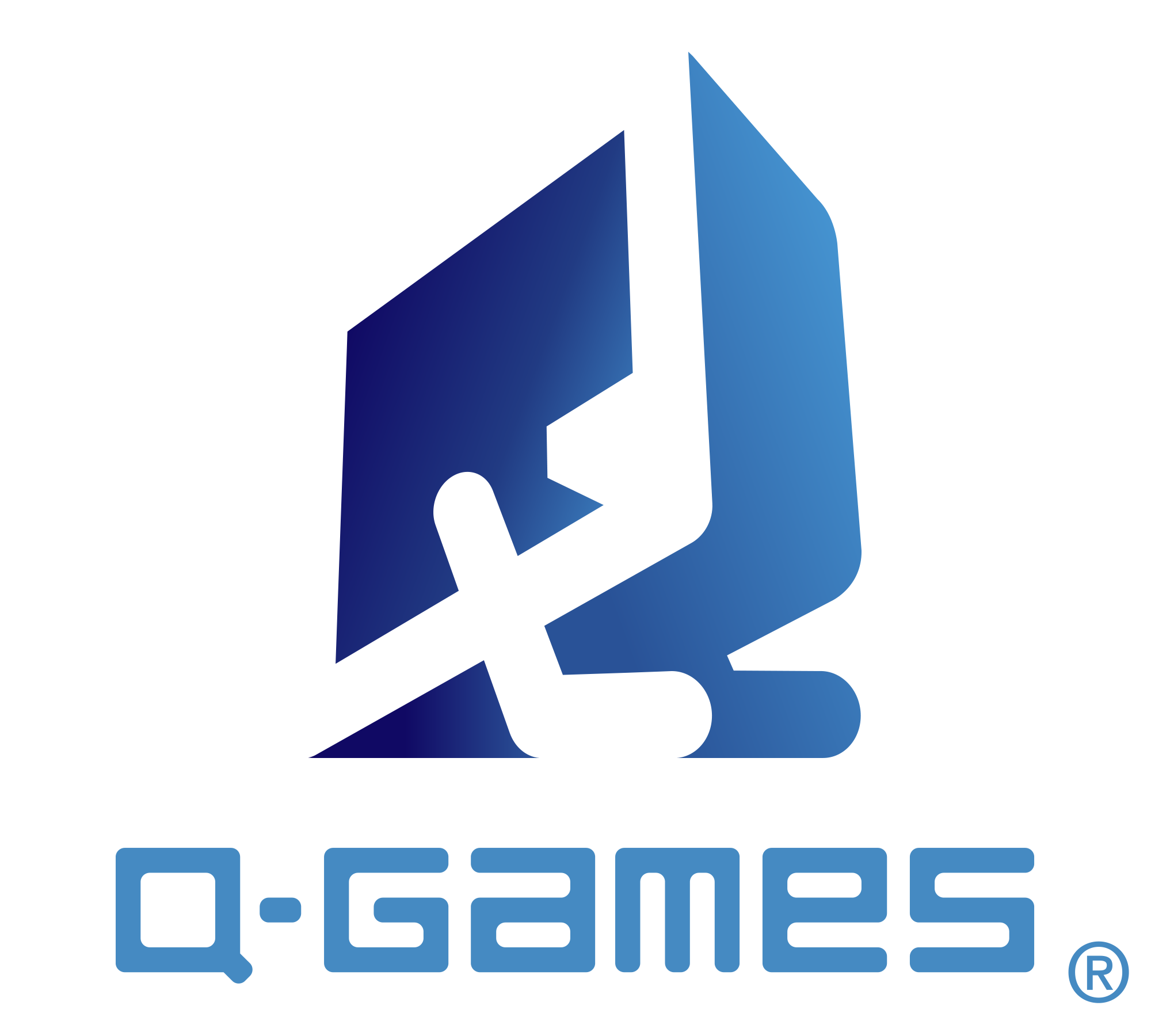
- Type: Private
- Industry: Video games
- Founded: 9 August 2001; 25 years ago
- Founder: Dylan Cuthbert
- Headquarters: Nakagyō-ku, Kyoto, Japan
- Key people: Dylan Cuthbert (President/Managing Director); Kenkichi Shimooka (Vice-President/Director)
- Products: PixelJunk series The Tomorrow Children
- Owner: Dylan Cuthbert
- Website: https://www.q-games.com/en/

Q-Games, Limited is a video game developer based in Nakagyō-ku, Kyoto, Japan. It was founded by Argonaut Games alumnus Dylan Cuthbert and was closely affiliated with Nintendo and Sony Interactive Entertainment.

== Foundation ==
Q-Games was founded by Dylan Cuthbert, of British origin, who at Argonaut Software previously helped create Starglider and Starglider 2, and gave programming assistance to X and the first Star Fox for Nintendo. After Star Fox 2 was canceled, Argonaut's contract with Nintendo ended. Cuthbert found the experimentation with Star Fox 2 helpful in his career. Cuthbert left Japan and moved to the United States to work with Sony. At Sony, he worked on Blasto for the PlayStation. After this, Cuthbert moved back to Japan to work at Japan Studio, where, in early 1999, he developed the Duck in a Bath technical demo that showcased the PlayStation 2's power to early developers and publishers. Following that, he developed Pipo Saru 2001 and then left Sony to start Q-Games Ltd. in Kyoto in August 2001.

== History ==
The studio's first few years were spent accumulating staff and developing behind-doors technology projects for a number of clients including Sony and Microsoft. At E3 2004, they showed two graphic technology demos for the PlayStation Portable and then internally began development on two games, one for the Game Boy Advance and one for the Nintendo DS. These titles were announced as Digidrive (part of the bit Generations series of puzzle games for the Game Boy Advance) and Star Fox Command respectively. Both were later released.

Following these projects, Q-Games began to collaborate with Sony Computer Entertainment, becoming a second-party studio partner, by developing the PixelJunk series of downloadable games for the PlayStation 3. They are available for download and purchase on the PlayStation Network Store worldwide. PixelJunk games are presented in 1080p full HD. PixelJunk made its worldwide debut on 11 July 2007 at E3 2007, held in Santa Monica, CA. At TGS 2009, Q-Games confirmed that it is extremely unlikely these games will ever appear on the Xbox 360.

Throughout its existence, Q-Games has continued to partner with multiple platform holders directly including Nintendo, Sony, and Google.

Q-Games have also worked with Nintendo again, releasing several games for the Nintendo DSi's DSiWare digital distribution service from 2009 to 2010. The studio would co-develop Star Fox 64 3D for the Nintendo 3DS with Nintendo EAD in releasing in 2011.

At Gamescom 2014, Q-Games announced The Tomorrow Children, an online adventure game that featured asynchronous multiplayer. The title was co-developed by Japan Studio and published by Sony Interactive Entertainment. The game launched in 2016 as a free to play title for the PlayStation 4, but was shut down by Sony after a year of operation.

Q-Games has also developed a number of titles exclusive for Apple Arcade including a new Frogger.

In 2021, it was announced that PixelJunk Raiders would be launching on Google Stadia. The title made use of the State Share feature to allow players to jump into other players game via a screenshot or video capture.

Q-Games negotiated with Sony to secure the rights to The Tomorrow Children in November 2021, and stated their intent to revive the game in the future. It was re-released by Q-Games in September 2022 as The Tomorrow Children: Phoenix Edition.

== Games developed ==
Game title	Release	Platform	Notes
Digidrive	July 27, 2006	Game Boy Advance	Part of the Bit Generations series
Star Fox Command	August 28, 2006	Nintendo DS	
PixelJunk Racers	September 13, 2007	PlayStation 3	
PixelJunk Monsters	January 24, 2008	PlayStation 3, PlayStation Vita, Microsoft Windows, Mac OS X, Linux	
PixelJunk Monsters Encore	April 24, 2008	PlayStation 3, PlayStation Vita, Microsoft Windows, Mac OS X, Linux	Expansion pack/add-on to PixelJunk Monsters
PixelJunk Eden	July 31, 2008	PlayStation 3, Microsoft Windows	
PixelJunk Monsters Deluxe	October 1, 2009	PlayStation Portable	
Art Style: DIGIDRIVE	October 2, 2009	DSiWare	Port of Digidrive
Trajectile	November 24, 2009	DSiWare	Known as Reflect Missile in PAL regions
PixelJunk Shooter	December 10, 2009	PlayStation 3, Microsoft Windows, Mac OS X, Linux, PlayStation 4, PlayStation Vita	
Starship Defense	December 18, 2009	DSiWare	Known as Starship Patrol in PAL regions
X-Scape	May 31, 2010	DSiWare	Known as X Returns in Japan and as 3D Space Tank in PAL regions
PixelJunk Shooter 2	March 1, 2011	PlayStation 3, PlayStation 4, PlayStation Vita, Microsoft Windows	Sequel to PixelJunk Shooter
Star Fox 64 3D	September 9, 2011	Nintendo 3DS	Remake of Star Fox 64, co-developed with Nintendo EAD
PixelJunk SideScroller	October 22, 2011	PlayStation 3	
PixelJunk 4am	May 15, 2012	PlayStation 3	
Visualizer	August 13, 2013	PlayStation 3	Music visualization
Nom Nom Galaxy	August 3, 2015	Microsoft Windows, Mac OS X, Linux, PlayStation 4	
PixelJunk Shooter Ultimate	October 21, 2015	Microsoft Windows, PlayStation 4, PlayStation Vita	
The Tomorrow Children	September 6, 2016	PlayStation 4	
Dead Hungry	December 6, 2016	Microsoft Windows, PlayStation VR	VR project for HTC Vive and Oculus Rift
Eden Obscura	May 18, 2018	iOS, Android	Follow-up to PixelJunk Eden
PixelJunk Monsters 2	May 25, 2018	Nintendo Switch, PlayStation 4, Microsoft Windows, Mac OS X, Linux	Sequel to PixelJunk Monsters, published by Spike Chunsoft
Frogger in Toy Town	September 20, 2019	Apple Arcade	Based on the 1981 arcade game Frogger
Scrappers	April 16, 2020	Apple Arcade	
PixelJunk Eden 2	December 10, 2020	Nintendo Switch, Microsoft Windows, PlayStation 4, PlayStation 5	a direct continuation of PixelJunk Eden and Eden Obscura
PixelJunk Raiders	March 1, 2021	Stadia	
The Tomorrow Children: Phoenix Edition	September 6, 2022	PlayStation 4, PlayStation 5	Re-release of The Tomorrow Children
All You Need is Help	September 26, 2024	Microsoft Windows, Nintendo Switch, PlayStation 5, Xbox One, Xbox Series X/S	
Dreams of Another	October 10, 2025	Microsoft Windows, PlayStation 5, PlayStation VR2	
PixelJunk Monsters 3	TBA	Microsoft Windows	

== Other projects ==
As well as games development, Q-Games developed technology directly with Sony Japan for the PlayStation 3. The PS3's XMB (Xross Media Bar) interface, background and music visualizer were developed by Q-Games and they are credited with 3D Graphics Technology in the About PS3 section of the PS3's OS.

=== PlayStation Home ===
On September 24, 2009, Q-Games released their own developer space for their series, PixelJunk in the PlayStation 3's online community-based service, PlayStation Home to the Japanese version and on October 9, 2009, to the North American version. The "PixelJunk Museum" (Japan), or "PixelJunk Exhibition" (North America), features the games PixelJunk Eden, PixelJunk Monsters, and PixelJunk Racers. For PixelJunk Eden there are glass wall art displays, for PixelJunk Monsters, there are displays of familiar characters from the game, and for PixelJunk Racers, there are displays of two different race cars. There is also a virtual shop in the space selling PixelJunk virtual items. In Japan's version from September 24, 2009, to October 9, 2009, near the shop, there was a panel that took users to a virtual version of Q-Games TGS 2009 Booth. Called the "Q-Games virtual public TGS Booth", it was a virtual recreation of the Q-Games TGS 2009 Booth that had a free T-shirt and a video screen. On December 17, 2009, they released another exhibition room to the "PixelJunk Exhibition" space. This room is to display PixelJunk Shooter and is called the "PixelJunk Shooter Mother Ship Hangar."

== Sources ==
- Chris Kohler's book Power-Up: How Japanese Video Games Gave the World an Extra Life - Chapter 6.
- "Special: Cuthbert On Japanese Game Development's Evolution". Game Developer. 2006-09-27.
- Dylan Cuthbert's profile on N-Sider.com (in English)
- Dylan Cuthbert video interview on the 1-UP Show (in English)
