= Kinetica Sports Ltd =

Irish sports nutrition brand

Kinetica Sports Limited
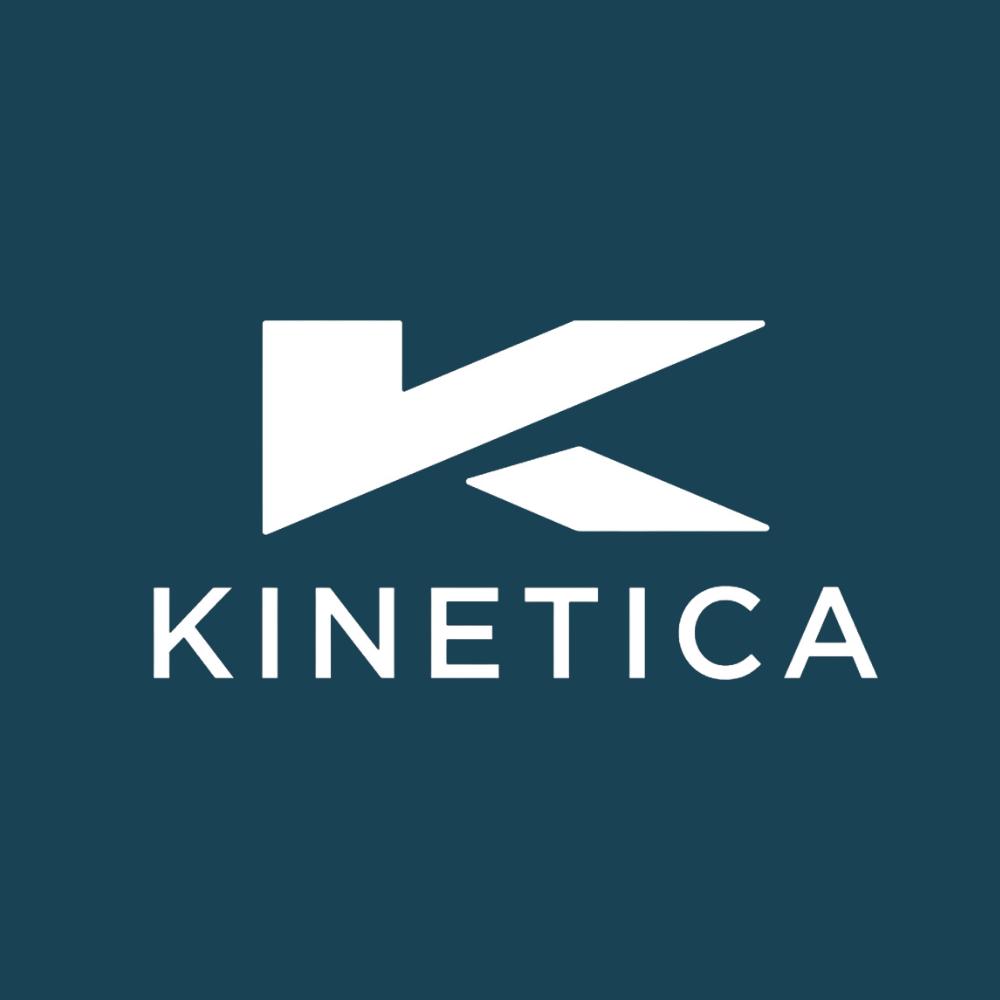
- Company type: Private limited company
- Industry: Sports Nutrition / Whey Protein
- Founded: 2009 (Cork, Ireland)
- Headquarters: Drogheda, County Meath, Ireland
- Products: Whey Protein, Lean Active Protein, Deluxe Protein Bars, 100% Creatine, BCAA, Energy Powder, Energy Gels, Caffeine Gels, Electro-C, Prefuel, Recovery, OatGain, Vitamin D3, Omega 3, Zinc Mg+, RTD High Protein Milkshake, Apparel, and Accessories
- Parent: Boyne Valley Group
- Website: kineticasports.com

Kinetica Sports Ltd is a global sports nutrition brand headquartered in County Meath, Ireland.

== Products ==
Kinetica Sports makes health and wellness products for the public and elite athletes like Olympians and professional sports people. Every batch of the Kinetica Sports product range is tested to comply to WADA (World Anti-Doping Agency) standards.

== Partnerships ==
Kinetica is the sports nutrition partner for sport associations and teams, including:

- Modest! Golf
- Connacht Rugby
- Rowing Ireland
- Cycling Ireland
- Dublin GAA
- West Ham United Women

Kinetica Sports has sponsored and exhibited at several events, including the ISPS Handa World Invitational, Thrive, Dubai Muscle Show and co-hosted Move at the Manor, the first of its kind fitness event post COVID restrictions beginning to lift.

== See also ==
- High-protein diet
- Whey protein
