= The Con (video game) =

2005 video game

- North American box art
- Developers: Think & Feel (Note: Development assistance by Santa Monica Studio.)
- Publisher: Sony Computer Entertainment: PAL: SouthPeak Interactive
- Platform: PlayStation Portable
- Release: NA: October 18, 2005; JP: February 23, 2006; AU: March 29, 2007; EU: March 30, 2007
- Genre: Fighting
- Modes: Single-player, multiplayer

The Con, released as Gamble Con Fight in Japan, and The Con: Gamble Fight in South Korea, is a fighting video game developed by Think & Feel and published by Sony Computer Entertainment for the PlayStation Portable in 2005. The story follows the life of a con artist who fights for money. It was released in North America in 2005, Japan in 2006 and PAL territories in 2007 by SouthPeak Interactive.

== Gameplay ==
The Con is an innovative 3D fighting game based on an underworld where illegal fighting tournaments exist and high-stakes gambling takes center stage. During gameplay, players can train their fighter to fight solo or in a team of three in Story Mode where their ability to build up a team and implementing match-up strategy plays a huge role. Throughout gameplay, players can learn re-programmable fighting combinations based on five different brawling disciplines—Boxing, Wrestling, Kick Boxing, Tae Kwon Do and Jeet Kune Do. These five brawling disciplines are always on default character, but the player's custom character can choose any brawling disciplines. All brawling disciplines have moves combinations that can be acted as combo, which can be updated depending on the moves a player puts in a combo.

=== Quick Play ===
There are three modes: arcade, time-attack and survival. In this mode, there are eleven stages. The first nine are random, and the final two are always the same: Hardcase, a supposedly disgraced man as he wears a cloth which covers his mouth and has scars on his body; and Mask, a man whose fighting style is dependent on the player; if the player is a street boxer, he is a street boxer too, etc.

== Plot ==
A con artist is introduced to underground fighting by Reina. He/she wins twice and then the protagonist is taught how to make money, and he/she has to do the following: Fight to win, pull off a comeback con, start like a loser and make a comeback, and take a dive, start like a winner and then lose.

Then the protagonist confronts Reina and tells her they are done. Reina says she owns him/her. Reina is killed by the protagonist who claims no one owns him. The protagonist then recruits two other fighters and form a team. Team (name) fight to get invited to the Big Time, where the winners of the tournament get 10 million dollars. They defeat Boneyard and his team Phantom of rank D (24-2), Smoke and his team Extreme of rank C (26-2), Shaman and his team Demoish of team B (36-2), Cinder and her team Crimson of rank A (52-6) and optionally, Cornfed and his team Triumph (57-0) (it is not required to defeat team Triumph to go to the Big Time Tournament). When that team jumps to rank A, Smoke, whom they fought at rank C, wants to join his/her team. If the protagonist wants him, he/she is going to have to choose which fighting style Smoke is going to fight as. Smoke masters every style in the game, but at the cost of another team member. One is going home, while Smoke joins the team. If he/she says no, he leaves immediately and there is no other chance. After some fights, the old team member comes back to take his/her old place. The protagonist can choose to keep Smoke or kick Smoke out.

Once they get to the Big Time tournament, the gang talk about the protagonist, but Kuro remains confident that Shades will take care of that team. That team fights to the finals, in the semi-finals defeating Shades and his team Collosus, but something strange happens during the finals. If the player accepted Smoke's offer, it is revealed he was infiltrating as he was never on the protagonist's side to begin with, alongside Cornfed and Kuro (they may have fought Cornfed at rank S already). If he/she did not accept the offer, or Smoke eventually got kicked out to get the old team member back, one of the team members is killed by Smoke. Either way, that team is going to have to fight team Menace with two members against the three.

Still, they defeat team Menace and bring home that prize money, and Kuro is arrested.

== Reception ==
Reception

Aggregate score
Aggregator	Score
Metacritic	63/100

Review scores
Publication	Score
Electronic Gaming Monthly	4/10
Eurogamer	6/10
Famitsu	26/40
Game Informer	8/10
GameRevolution	C
GameSpot	6.8/10
GameSpy	3.5/5
GameZone	7.5/10
IGN	6.2/10
Official U.S. PlayStation Magazine	2.5/5

The Con received "mixed" reviews according to video game review aggregator Metacritic. In Japan, Famitsu gave it a score of two sevens and two sixes, for a total of 26 out of 40.
