= PixelJunk Racers =

2007 video game

- PlayStation Store icon
- Developer(s): Q-Games (Note: Additional work by Santa Monica Studio.)
- Publisher(s): JP: Q-Games; WW: Sony Computer Entertainment
- Series: PixelJunk
- Platform(s): PlayStation 3
- Release: NA: September 13, 2007; JP: September 20, 2007; EU: October 25, 2007; 2nd Lap: JP: July 15, 2010; NA: August 24, 2010; PAL: August 25, 2010
- Genre(s): Racing
- Mode(s): Single-player, multiplayer

PixelJunk Racers is a racing video game developed and published by Q-Games for the PlayStation 3. It was released on the PlayStation Store in 2007 as the first title in the PixelJunk series, a collaboration between Q-Games and Sony Computer Entertainment, who released the game outside Japan. An updated version, PixelJunk Racers: 2nd Lap, was released in 2010.

== Gameplay ==
A screenshot of gameplay in PixelJunk Racers

Bearing structural similarity to slot car racing games, the tracks of PixelJunk Racers consist of five separate lanes within which the cars move. The camera is always fixed above the circuit, giving an aerial overview of the entire track. The commands a player can execute are; changing lanes, controlling the throttle, and honking the horn.

There are 32 gameplay modes available out of 16 core modes. Core racing modes have up to three levels of difficulty (Normal, Turbo and Master) varying with the speed of the gameplay. There is a total of 10 tracks on which each mode can be played.

The single player mode includes a tournament, free racing (Quick Race), and Score Attack. In Score Attack, the player's best score in any mode is ranked online, and scores appear on PlayStation Network leaderboards. The multiplayer mode is exclusively offline, and up to seven players may simultaneously play the game on the same console.

=== 2nd Lap ===
PixelJunk Racers 2nd Lap, an enhanced version of Racers, was released in 2010. 2nd Lap was made available for free to players who had already purchased the original Racers. 2nd Lap includes new game types, trophies, and a "Ghost Attack" mode in which players can race the recorded "ghosts" of any online player with registered high scores.

== Reception ==
=== PixelJunk Racers ===
PixelJunk Racers

Aggregate score
Aggregator	Score
Metacritic	62/100

Review scores
Publication	Score
1Up.com	D+
GameSpot	7/10
GamesTM	8/10
IGN	5.2/10
PlayStation Official Magazine – UK	5/10
PALGN	4.5/10
Play	74%
PSM3	80%

Upon its release, PixelJunk Racers received "mixed" reviews according to the review aggregation website Metacritic. The variety of gameplay modes was praised by some critics, though IGN asserted that the "diverse game types can't quite save the core mechanics", calling them "aggravatingly repetitive". The difficulty of the game in general was unappealing to many reviewers. In a review from 1UP.com, a phenomenon was noted in which the enemy cars would fill up all five lanes, making them impassable. Gameplay instances such as this were described as "controller-hurlingly frustrating".

Another significant criticism stems from the lack of online multiplayer capabilities. The only online component of the game involves comparing high scores with other players. However, PixelJunk Racers does support up to seven players offline; GameSpot suggested this feature would make it an enjoyable party game, even if organizing a seven-player session in one area could be considered a hassle.

=== 2nd Lap ===
PixelJunk Racers: 2nd Lap

Aggregate score
Aggregator	Score
Metacritic	66/100

Review scores
Publication	Score
Eurogamer	7/10
GamesMaster	60%

2nd Lap received "average" reviews, albeit a bit more favorable than the original PixelJunk Racers, according to Metacritic.
