= Peter Van Hoesen =

Belgian electronic music producer, composer, DJ and live performer

Peter van Hoesen
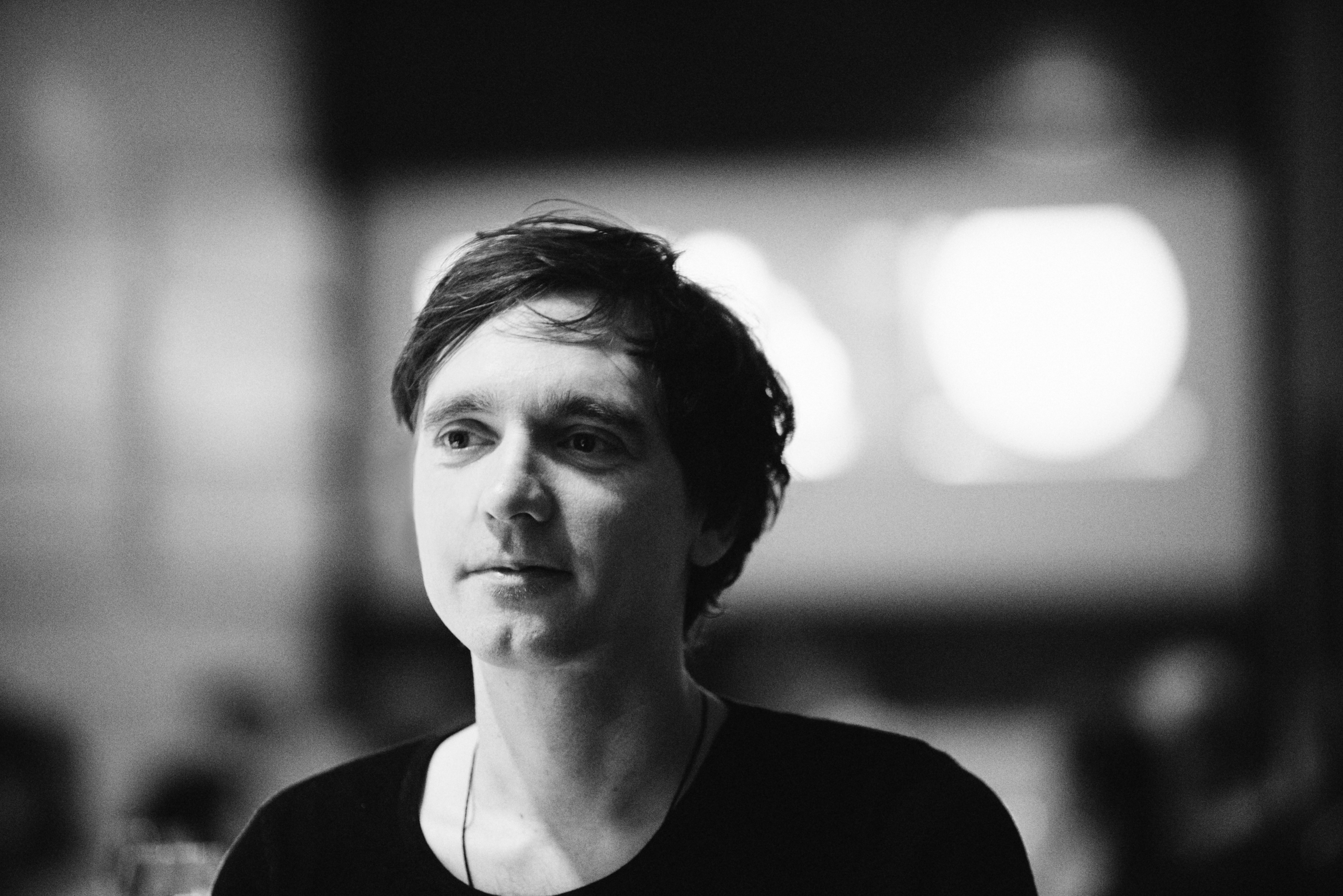
- Born: 19 July 1970 (age 55); Schoten, Belgium
- Education: Masters in Communication Sciences from Vrije Universiteit Brussel
- Occupations: Electronic music producer, composer, DJ, live performer
- Known for: Bass-heavy, abstract techno with a psychedelic approach
- Notable work: Geotope, A Smaller Divide, Ground and Figure

Peter van Hoesen (born 19 July 1970) is a Belgian electronic music producer, composer, DJ and live performer.

== Biography ==
Van Hoesen was born in Schoten near Antwerp, Belgium and grew up in Antwerp. He attended music academy between the ages of 11 and 14 and in those years started playing the electronic organ, then bass guitar and guitar. He was a member of several bands and played bass and keys. Leaving Antwerp for Brussels aged 18, van Hoesen went to Vrije Universiteit Brussel from 1988 to 1994 to study for a master's degree in Communication Sciences.

Growing up around the time of EBM's peak popularity in Belgium, it was this and New Beat that first excited him. A first club experience came during his teenage years and inspired him to get into techno and DJing. He also started putting on his own techno events while at University and got ever more involved with the Brussels's scene.

Attending clubs like Fuse in its early years, he grew bored of techno by the year 2000 and began researching other forms of music. At this time he was also developing the Foton collective (experimental music) and released a first album under his Object alias, 2001's Release the Object. In 2002 he released 1025 as RM, a collaborative alias with Jeroen Baekelandt.

Around 2004 van Hoesen expanded his experimental interests and started exploring drum and bass and later dubstep. He co-organised one of the first Belgian dubstep events with Mutant Hip Hop in 2005. In 2006 he returned to techno with the release of the Increments EP.

Throughout his career, van Hoesen has launched labels like Foton, which ran from 1998 to 2006, Time To Express in 2008, and was co-founder of Archives Interieures in 2013.

He also collaborates with Yves De Mey as Sendai, composing music which focusses on fragmented rhythms and advanced sound design. They have released albums such as Geotope(2012), A Smaller Divide (2014) and Ground and Figure (2016) on Editions Mego.

As such, van Hoesen has produced various styles of music, but is best known for his bass-heavy, abstract take on techno with a psychedelic approach.

Hoesen is also a composer who has made music for Zoo/Thomas Hauert's contemporary dance company in the form of Accords and You've Changed, which was composed in 7.1 surround sound. He has done composition and programming for Bent Object: In Human Format and Winning, composed the tracks for Terrene with Heleen Blanken and has curated art installations with the Foton collective.

As both a DJ and performer van Hoesen has played at key clubs and festivals across Europe, America, Australia and Asia.

In 2010 he moved from Brussels to Berlin, where he co-founded synthesizerstudio Handwerk Audio.

As of 2023, he is based in Ho Chi Minh City, Vietnam.

== Discography ==
=== Albums ===
- 2010 – Entropic City (Time To Express)
- 2012 – Perceiver (Time To Express)
- 2013 – Life Performance (Tresor)

=== EPs / singles ===
- 2006 – Increments E.P. (Lan Muzik)
- 2008 – Empire In Decline/Third Piece (Time To Express)
- 2008 – L.O.C (Lan Muzik)
- 2008 – Casual Care (Time To Express)
- 2008 – Trusted E.P. (Time To Express)
- 2009 – Face Of Smoke / Continued Care (Morse)
- 2009 – Attribute One (Time To Express)
- 2009 – Past Revisited EP (Morse)
- 2010 – Talis (Single) (Curle Recordings)
- 2010 – Variable Parts EP (Time To Express)
- 2010 – Entroppic Minus Six (Time To Express)
- 2010 – Irrational X (Exone)
- 2011 – North 6th (Komisch)
- 2012 – Transitional State (Time To Express)
- 2013 – Receiver 2/3 (Time To Express)
- 2013 – Life Performance EP (Tresor)
- 2013 – Receiver 3/3 (Time To Express)
- 2013 – Receiver 1/3 (Time To Express)
- 2014 – Outlands EP (Curle Recordings)
- 2014 – Call & Responses EP (Time To Express)
- 2015 – Stealth 1/3 (Time To Express)
- 2015 – Seventy Secrets (Time To Express)
- 2016 – Stealth 3/3 (Time To Express)
- 2016 – Quadra (Dekmantel UFO Series)
- 2020 – Chapter for the Agnostic
- 2020 – Illusions of Contributions
- 2020 – Debord's Children
- 2021 – Echoes from Westbrook Bay

=== DJ mixes ===
- 2008 – Process Series Part 078 (Modyfier-Modifying)
- 2009 – Process Series Part 136 ( Leave The Land Untouched) (Modyfier-Modifying)
- 2009 – LWE Podcast 25 (Little White Earbuds)
- 2009 – Mnml Ssgs Mx09 (mnml ssgs)
- 2009 – RA.168 (Resident Advisor)
- 2010 – FACT Mix 153 (FACT Magazine)
- 2011 – Smoke Machine Podcast 022 (Smoke Machine)
- 2011 – Ssg Special (mnml ssgs)
- 2012 – Mnml Ssgs Mx Fnl (mnml ssgs)
- 2014 – /IA/ MIX 142 (Inverted Audio)
- 2015 – Stealth (Time To Express)
