= Kinetica =

2001 racing game

- Developer: Santa Monica Studio
- Publisher: Sony Computer Entertainment
- Producer: Shannon Studstill
- Designers: Richard Foge; Quinlan Richards; Tobin A. Russell; David Jaffe
- Programmer: Tim Moss
- Platform: PlayStation 2
- Release: NA: October 16, 2001
- Genre: Racing
- Modes: Single-player, multiplayer

Kinetica is a 2001 racing video game developed by Santa Monica Studio and published by Sony Computer Entertainment for the PlayStation 2 in North America. The game incorporates the use of SoundMAX audio technology by Analog Devices.

It was the first game to use the Kinetica game engine which would later be used for the video games SOCOM U.S. Navy SEALs, God of War and God of War II. An art book titled The Art of Kinetica was included with the game itself, containing artwork of the game's characters. In 2016, the game was re-released on PlayStation 4.

== Gameplay ==
Kinetica is set in the future versions of Earth's major cities, outer-space, and some fictional locations in the Earth's distant future. Twelve racers compete while wearing "Kinetic Suits", which have wheels on the hands and feet, giving racers the appearance of motorcycles. Kinetic Suits have the ability to scale walls and ceilings, the vehicles are capable of reaching terminal velocity and beyond, reaching speeds of over 350 miles per hour (560 km/h).

The goal is the same as any racing game: be the first to cross the finish line. There are fifteen tracks and three seasons in the game. Each season consists of four tracks that the player must obtain a certain place in to advance. Getting first place in every race in a season will unlock a bonus track, and getting first place in the bonus track will unlock both the default and alternate versions of one of the unlockable characters. In order to progress through the game, the player must obtain first, second, or third place in the first season races. In the second season, the player must place first or second place, while in the third season the player must win each race in first place to advance.

Scattered around the tracks are power-up crystals that come in yellow and purple colors. Collecting five yellow crystals will give the player a power-up, while getting one purple crystal automatically gives the player a power-up regardless of how many yellow crystals the player has collected. Characters can perform stunts on the ground and in the air to add to the boost meter to gain access to faster than normal speeds, though this meter can also be filled by getting one of the three boost power-ups from the power-up crystals.

== Reception ==
Reception

Aggregate score
Aggregator	Score
Metacritic	77/100

Review scores
Publication	Score
EP Daily	8/10
Game Informer	8/10
GameRevolution	B
GameSpot	7/10
GameSpy	4/5
GameZone	8/10
IGN	8/10
Next Generation	3/5
Official U.S. PlayStation Magazine	4.5/5
PlayStation: The Official Magazine	8/10
Maxim	8/10

Kinetica received "generally favorable reviews" according to the review aggregator website Metacritic. Louis Bedigian of GameZone praised the game, stating "it practically annihilates Extreme G3 [sic] and the last two F-Zero games released." Gary Whitta of NextGen called it "An intriguing twist on a largely played-out genre, although the Autobots-style racers might turn some gamers off." Four-Eyed Dragon of GamePro said, "Despite its setbacks, Kinetica is a decent racer worth trying. It offers a phenomenal visual rush into new-age racing." (Note: GamePro gave the game 4/5 for graphics, 3/5 for sound, and two 3.5/5 scores for control and fun factor.)
