= Fat Princess =

2009 video game

- Pre-eliminary logo
- Developers: Titan Studios; SuperVillain Studios (PSP) (Note: Additional work by Santa Monica Studio.)
- Publisher: Sony Computer Entertainment
- Engine: Unreal Engine 3
- Platforms: PlayStation 3; PlayStation Portable
- Release: July 30, 2009: PlayStation 3; WW: July 30, 2009; JP: December 25, 2009 PlayStation Portable; PAL: March 11, 2010; JP: March 11, 2010; KO: March 12, 2010; NA: May 4, 2010
- Genres: Action, real-time strategy
- Modes: Single-player, multiplayer

Fat Princess is an action real-time strategy video game developed by Titan Studios and published by Sony Computer Entertainment for the PlayStation 3. It was released in North America, Europe and Australia on July 30, 2009, and in Japan on December 25 the same year, as Pocchari Princess (ぽっちゃり☆プリンセス, Pocchari ☆ Purinsesu). It was included on the Best of PlayStation Network Vol. 1 compilation disc, released on June 18, 2013. A PlayStation Portable version, titled Fat Princess: Fistful of Cake, (Note: Known in Japan as Pocchari Princess Portable (ぽっちゃり☆プリンセス ポータブル, Pocchari ☆ Purinsesu Pōtaburu)) was released in 2010.

Fat Princess is a multiplayer game for up to 32 players, with the basic goal of rescuing the Princess and bringing her back to the team's base, a twist on capture the flag. The players pick up and carry cakes to feed the Princess, which makes her heavier and harder for the enemy to carry back to their own castle. The game contains six character classes (Villager, Worker, Priest, Ranger, Mage and Warrior) and three downloadable classes (Pirate, Ninja and Giant), each of which contributes to the team's task of capturing the princess in a unique way.

== Gameplay ==
Feeding the enemy princess pieces of cake makes her harder to carry.

In Fat Princess, players play as team members. There are two teams, red and blue, with up to 16 members each (32 players in total). To make their opponents' task more difficult, players can feed the captive princess cake slices. With each slice, she becomes heavier and harder to carry back to her respective castle. Over time, the effect of the cake wears off.

Players can change their character classes and abilities by picking up hats that are generated by the hat machines at their team's castle. Hats can be found on the warzone where enemies have fallen. The game's six classes are the Villager, Priest, Mage, Warrior, Ranger, and Worker with three additional classes (Pirate, Ninja, and Giant) from Fat Roles add-on pack. Each class has its own unique set of abilities and skills, and different amount of health. When damage is taken, the health level is reduced and all classes except giant can sit to eat cake in order to restore health. The three classes from Fat Roles add-on do not come from hat machines, instead they come from a magic hat. Players can pick up this hat and switch between the three classes.

Players can upgrade hat machines, and construct fortifications and siege equipment using resources like woods and ores, which can be gathered from various locations on each map. Upgrades provide alternative weapons or attacks to each class. The three classes that do not come from hat machines cannot be upgraded, but they have magic points that will accumulate as time goes and once the bar is full, they can use special abilities. Pirates can fire cannonballs, Ninjas can turn invisible, and Giants can eat enemies and regain health.

Other interactive objects are bombs, potions that turn players into chickens when thrown, and torches that most classes can use to ignite their weapons to do additional damage.

There are several modes featured:

- Rescue the Princess: This is the main mode of the game. The main objective is to rescue the princess from the opposing team's castle, while simultaneously keeping the enemy's princess imprisoned in their own castle.
- Legend of the Fat Princess: This is the story mode. It contains seven chapters and six levels, comprising all the other modes.
- Team Deathmatch: The objective is to kill members of the opposing team. The first team to reduce the opposing team's life to zero is the winner. No princess to rescue in this mode.
- Invasion: The objective of this mode is to capture outposts. As soon as a team controls 50% of all outposts, the opposing team's counter will start to count down. The first team to have their counter reach zero loses.
- Snatch 'n Grab: This mode is very similar to Rescue the Princess. However, instead of rescuing the princess, both teams already have their princesses in their castle at the beginning of the game. The objective is to kidnap the opposing team's princess and imprison her. As soon as the enemy's princess is put in the dungeon, she will disappear and re-spawn in her castle. The first team to kidnap and imprison the opposing team's princess three times is the winner.
- Queen's Rule: This is a special mode that is only available in soccer map. As soon as this map is selected, the game mode will automatically switch to this mode. There is no princess and hat machines in this mode. Occasionally, hats, bombs, and resources will drop from the sky. The objective of this mode is to put the soccer ball into the opposing team's goal post. The team with more goals at the end of the game wins.
- Gladiate: In this mode, the player plays solo instead of being in a team most of the time. The player choose a hat at the beginning and they will stay in that class throughout the game. There are 12 rounds to win, and some rounds introduce new enemies.

== Development ==
The game was originally developed by Darkstar Industries, which went defunct at some point; the developers opened a new studio named Titan Studios under Epic Games China. Fat Princess was their only original game as they mostly provided support to other Epic Games projects. A private beta for the game was held in June 2009.

There were several supporting reports dealing with the game's release date before it was confirmed for release on July 30, 2009. While some sources presently indicate the game should be ready by "late August", it was later revealed by the PlayStation Store team that, while the game will have a simultaneous local release, its release window could only be told as "[at] some point this century".

=== PlayStation Home ===
In PlayStation Home from July 30 to September 10, 2009, Sony launched a new event in PlayStation Home, which involved the player embarking on a "very special confectionery quest". The event was called "Fat Princess: Quest for Cake". In this quest the users had to hunt down eight pieces of cake locked in cages and when they managed to do this successfully they were rewarded with a "Fat Princess: Throne" for their personal apartment. This event was being held in the European and North American versions of PlayStation Home in a specially decorated PlayStation Events Space. The spaces used were Events Landing and The Gallery. The event was also held in the Asian version of Home the same year, but began on 27 August and ended on 10 September. An interesting note about this event is that the redesigning of the Events Landing and The Gallery spaces and the event were done by nDreams, the company behind the world's first console-based alternate reality game, Xi, which was also based in Home.

=== Downloadable content ===
An add-on pack, named Fat Roles, developed by Atomic Operations Media, was released on June 19, 2010, adding three new character classes: Pirate, Ninja and Giant. A free patch released alongside the downloadable content added support for same-screen co-op, clan tags and password-protected private games.

=== PSP version ===
A PSP port, titled Fat Princess: Fistful of Cake, was made by SuperVillain Studios and published by Sony Computer Entertainment in March 2010. There are four new multiplayer modes exclusive to the PSP version: Demolition, Dilapidation, Grim Reaper, and Jailbreak. There are also six more levels than the original, and an expanded single-player story mode with the new modes added into the storyline.

== Reception ==
Reception

Aggregate score
Aggregator	Score	
Aggregator	PS3	PSP
Metacritic	79/100	74/100

Review scores
Publication	Score	
Publication	PS3	PSP
Destructoid	9/10	N/A
Edge	7/10	N/A
Eurogamer	6/10	N/A
GamePro	4.5/5	N/A
GameSpot	7.5/10	6/10
GameSpy	4/5	N/A
GameTrailers	8.4/10	8/10
Giant Bomb	4/5	N/A
IGN	9/10	6.8/10
PlayStation Official Magazine – UK	8/10	N/A
PlayStation: The Official Magazine	N/A	7/10
The A.V. Club	B−	N/A
Teletext GameCentral	6/10	N/A

The original Fat Princess received "generally favorable reviews", while Fistful of Cake received "average" reviews, according to the review aggregation website Metacritic. IGN praised the PS3 version's versatility and charm. GameTrailers gave the same console version the award of Best Downloadable Game of 2009.

411Mania gave the PS3 version 8.5 out of 10 and called it "a breath of fresh air: A good multiplayer game that is not another generic shooter, with an excellent art style, quirky charm and well-balanced units. Two thumbs up for Fat Princess." However, The A.V. Club gave it a B− and said that "the core design, which seems so elegant at first, leads either to quick decisions between teams of unmatched skill, or long slogs worthy of a Russian winter campaign. When the action drags on, the not-inconsiderable cute factor starts to wear away. Fat princesses need love, sure, but they also need more complex characters to earn it." Teletext GameCentral gave it six out of ten and said: "The princess may have bitten off more than she can chew with her clever but confused multiplayer melees."

Some feminist groups criticized the game's premise, accusing it of reinforcing stereotypes and promoting prejudice against overweight women.

== Additional games ==
In 2015, two additional Fat Princess titles were released. Fat Princess Adventures, a dungeon-crawler action role-playing game, was released on December 5, 2015, for the PlayStation 4. A mobile puzzle game, Fat Princess: Piece of Cake, was released on January 13, 2015, for iOS, Android, and PlayStation Vita.

The titular character was also included in 2012's PlayStation All-Stars Battle Royale as a playable fighter.
