= Datura (video game) =

2012 video game

- Developer: Plastic (Note: Additional work by Santa Monica Studio.)
- Publisher: Sony Computer Entertainment
- Platform: PlayStation 3
- Release: NA: 8 May 2012; PAL: 9 May 2012; JP: 17 May 2012
- Genre: Adventure
- Mode: Single-player

Datura is a 2012 adventure game developed by Polish former demogroup Plastic and published by Sony Computer Entertainment for the PlayStation 3. It is the second collaboration between Plastic and Sony after Linger in Shadows.

== Gameplay ==
Datura can be played with either the PlayStation Move or the DualShock 3. The player starts as a patient in an ambulance, from which ends up mysteriously in a forest. The gameplay is built upon the exploration of the forest, where the player can interact with objects and other characters.

== Reception ==
Reception

Aggregate score
Aggregator	Score
Metacritic	57/100

Review scores
Publication	Score
Edge	4/10
Eurogamer	5/10
GameRevolution	3.5/5
GameSpot	4/10
GamesRadar+	3.5/5
GameTrailers	6/10
IGN	6/10
PlayStation Official Magazine – UK	6/10
Polygon	6.5/10
PlayStation: The Official Magazine	6/10
Metro	4/10

The game received "mixed or average" reviews, according to the review aggregation website Metacritic. IGN praised the atmospheric elements, but criticised the shortness and the clumsiness of the gameplay. GameSpot heavily criticised the shortness and the lack of clarity in the plot. Kotaku commended its originality, yet defined the overall experience of Datura as "confusing, unsatisfying, and ultimately fleeting".
