= PixelJunk =

Video game series

- Developers: Q-Games; Double Eleven (ports)
- Publishers: Q-Games; Sony Computer Entertainment (2007–12); Spike Chunsoft (2018)
- Platforms: Android, Apple Arcade, Facebook, Google Stadia, iOS, Linux, macOS, Microsoft Windows, Nintendo Switch, PlayStation 3, PlayStation 4, PlayStation 5, PlayStation Portable, PlayStation Vita, Wii U
- First release: PixelJunk Racers; July 11, 2007
- Latest release: PixelJunk Raiders; March 1, 2021

PixelJunk is a series of downloadable games developed by Q-Games. The series made its debut on PlayStation 3 with PixelJunk Racers, released July 11, 2007.

The series was a collaboration with Sony Computer Entertainment, who released the games on PlayStation platforms until 2012, with Q-Games themselves publishing on other platforms and for PlayStation in Japan. Spike Chunsoft handled worldwide publishing for PixelJunk Monsters 2 in 2018.

== Development ==
PixelJunk is developed by Q-Games, headed by Dylan Cuthbert. The series began in 2007 with the release of PixelJunk Racers. While Racers was met with modest critical and commercial reception, 2008 and 2009 saw the releases of the more popular, critically acclaimed titles PixelJunk Monsters, PixelJunk Eden and PixelJunk Shooter.

In an interview at TGS 2009, Q-Games stated that proper development on PixelJunk 1-5 would start in 2010. A PixelJunk title known tentatively as PixelJunk Dungeons, and was in the conceptual phase of production in 2008. Q-Games officially revealed PixelJunk 1-5 as PixelJunk Lifelike on September 16, 2010 during the SCEI's 2010 Tokyo Game Show conference. However, it was later renamed PixelJunk 4am. It is unclear if PixelJunk Dungeons is still under development.

On May 18, 2010 PixelJunk Shooter 2 was revealed on the official PlayStation blog due for release in 2011.

== Games ==
=== Series 1 ===
The first series of PixelJunk games are all described by Q-Games president Dylan Cuthbert as having "simplicity, familiarity, and originality" in common. Games in the first series are also two-dimensional and run in 1080p HD at 60fps.

#	Title	Year	Platform(s)	Notes
1-1	PixelJunk Racers	2007	PlayStation 3	An expanded version, 1-1a PixelJunk Racers 2nd Lap, was released in 2010.
1-2	PixelJunk Monsters	2007	PlayStation 3, PlayStation Portable, PlayStation Vita, Windows, macOS, Linux, Wii U	An expansion, 1-2a PixelJunk Monsters Encore, was released in 2008. An expanded version for PSP, PixelJunk Monsters Deluxe, was released in 2009. A remastered version, PixelJunk Monsters Ultimate, was released in 2013.
1-3	PixelJunk Eden	2008	PlayStation 3, Windows	An expansion, 1-3a PixelJunk Eden Encore, was released in 2009.
1-4	PixelJunk Shooter	2009	PlayStation 3, PlayStation 4, PlayStation Vita, Windows, macOS, Linux	A remastered version, PixelJunk Shooter Ultimate, was released in 2014 combining both parts with updated graphics.
1-4a	PixelJunk Shooter 2	2011	PlayStation 3, PlayStation 4, PlayStation Vita, Windows	A remastered version, PixelJunk Shooter Ultimate, was released in 2014 combining both parts with updated graphics.
1-4b	PixelJunk SideScroller	2011	PlayStation 3	A full game based on the bonus level of Shooter 2
1-5	PixelJunk 4am	2012	PlayStation 3	Titled PixelJunk Lifelike during development. Compatible with PlayStation Move.
1-6	PixelJunk Nom Nom Galaxy	2015	PlayStation 4, Windows	Titled PixelJunk Inc. during development.

=== Series 2 ===
The second series was planned concurrently with the first. In 2008, Cuthbert suggested that games of the second series could "take some of the old 3D looks and bring them up to the full HD kind of style." He later confirmed Series 2 would "venture into aesthetically pleasing 3D," though not all releases in the series are 3D.

#	Title	Year	Platform(s)	Notes
2-1	PixelJunk Monsters 2	2018	PlayStation 4, Nintendo Switch, Windows	Two expansions, 2-1a PixelJunk Monsters 2 Encore and 2-1b PixelJunk Monsters 2 Danganronpa, were released in 2018.
2-2	PixelJunk Scrappers	2020	PlayStation 4, PlayStation 5, Nintendo Switch, Windows, Apple Arcade	An expanded version, PixelJunk Scrappers Deluxe, was released in 2023. Discontinued from Apple Arcade in 2023.
2-3	PixelJunk Eden 2	2020	PlayStation 4, PlayStation 5, Nintendo Switch, Windows	
2-4	PixelJunk Raiders	2021	Google Stadia	Discontinued with Stadia's closure in 2023.
2-5	All you need is Help	2024	PlayStation 4, PlayStation 5, Nintendo Switch, Windows	
2-6	Dreams of Another	2025	PlayStation 5	Compatible with PlayStation VR2.

=== Spin-offs ===
#	Title	Year	Platform(s)	Notes
1	PixelJunk Monsters Online	2011	Facebook	A free-to-play version of Monsters released as a social network game. Discontinued between 2013 and 2014.
2	PixelJunk VR: Dead Hungry	2016	PlayStation 4, Windows	Compatible with PlayStation VR, Oculus Rift and HTC Vive.
3	PixelJunk Eden Obscura	2018	iOS, Android	A "reimagining" of Eden that utilises the smartphone's camera to create background effects within the game.
4	PixelJunk Monsters: Trouble in Paradise	2021	iOS, Android	Titled PixelJunk Monsters Duo during development.

== PixelJunk Museum ==
On September 24, 2009, Q-Games released a virtual space for PlayStation Home. Titled PixelJunk Museum (PixelJunk Exhibition in North America), the space included virtual displays for PixelJunk Racers, PixelJunk Monsters, and PixelJunk Eden, as well as a virtual gift shop where users could buy PixelJunk and Q Games-branded Home items. A separate "room" featuring the interior of the "Ers Piñita Colada" space center from PixelJunk Shooter was added to the space on December 17, 2009 in the NA region.

The Japanese version of the space included an exclusive "Q-Games virtual public TGS Booth" — a recreation of the Q-Games booth at the 2009 Tokyo Games Show where users could claim a free T-shirt for their Home avatar.
