= Source (photography magazine) =

Northern Irish photography magazine

- The cover of Source issue 55, Summer 2008, featuring the work of artist Hew Locke
- Categories: Photography
- Frequency: Quarterly
- Based in: Belfast, Northern Ireland
- Language: English
- Website: www.source.ie
- ISSN: 1369-2224

Source is a quarterly photography magazine published in Belfast. It is distributed throughout Ireland, Great Britain and internationally.

== History ==
Source was first published in 1992 as a newsletter of the organisation Photo Works North. This organisation had been set up the previous year to promote photography in Northern Ireland. The first editor was the photographer Paul Seawright.

From 1995 Source expanded its remit to include review coverage of exhibitions across Ireland and the UK. Since 2002 it has also included extensive reviews of photographic publishing. In 2007 Source published its 50th issue and was relaunched in a new format with additional columns and more review coverage.

== Coverage ==
Source is primarily concerned with social, historical or aesthetic uses of photography rather than technical or amateur photography. The magazine deals largely with art photography, in exhibition or book reviews, essays or in the portfolios of photographs it publishes. These portfolios are selected from submissions, including those from photographers who have attended the regular portfolio days the magazine has run at venues around Ireland and the UK since 1997.

However, as well as art photography the magazine is also concerned with other non-artistic uses of the medium and has in the past published essays on subjects such as police photography, pornography, satellite photographs, children's book illustration, copyright, photography and literature, and the history of photography. This approach is typified by two columns that have run since the magazine's relaunch in 2007, discussing photography in relation to 'advertising' and 'law'.

== Source website ==
Source has had a website since 1997. Since 2002 this has included a growing archive of all the back issue content of the magazine. Additionally it contains two projects that are specific to the website: oral history interviews and graduate photography online. The Source oral history archive consists of lengthy interviews with photographers, curators and writers about their lives and involvement in photography. These are gradually being made available as indexed audio files sometimes up to three hours in length. Graduate photography online, running since 2007 is a large gallery of the work of graduating photography students in Ireland and the UK with each student represented by a selection of their work indexed by the universities they have attended.
