= PixelJunk Monsters =

2007 tower defense video game

- PlayStation Store icon
- Developers: Q-Games (Note: Additional work by Santa Monica Studio); Double Eleven (Ultimate HD, Wii U)
- Publishers: JP: Q-Games; WW: Sony Computer Entertainment (PS3); WW: Double Eleven (Ultimate HD, Wii U)
- Series: PixelJunk
- Platforms: PlayStation 3 PlayStation Portable; PlayStation Vita; Microsoft Windows; Mac OS X Linux; Wii U
- Release: December 6, 2007: PlayStation 3; JP: December 6, 2007; WW: January 24, 2008 Encore; JP: April 24, 2008; NA: May 8, 2008; EU: May 15, 2008 PSP; EU: October 1, 2009; JP: November 1, 2009; NA: April 27, 2010 Ultimate HD PlayStation Vita; NA: July 30, 2013; PAL: July 31, 2013; JP: November 26, 2013 Microsoft Windows August 26, 2013 Mac OS X & Linux October 1, 2013 Wii U May 19, 2016
- Genre: Tower defense
- Modes: Single-player, multiplayer

PixelJunk Monsters is a tower defense video game developed by Q-Games for the PlayStation 3. The second game in the PixelJunk series, it was originally released in Japan on December 6, 2007 and worldwide by Sony Computer Entertainment on the PlayStation Store on January 24, 2008. The game was released for the PlayStation Portable under the title PixelJunk Monsters Deluxe.

PixelJunk Monsters Encore, an expansion pack for the game, was released on April 24, 2008 in Japan; May 8, 2008 in North America; and May 15, 2008 in Europe.

In 2013, an enhanced version developed by Double Eleven titled PixelJunk Monsters Ultimate HD was released in 2013 for the PlayStation Vita, Windows, Mac OS X and Linux. In May 2016, a port of the original game also developed by Double Eleven was released for the Wii U.

In 2018, PixelJunk Monsters 2 was released, incorporating 3D graphics and new features.

== Gameplay ==
A screenshot of gameplay in PixelJunk Monsters Encore

Gameplay in PixelJunk Monsters has similarities to various tower defense titles. The objective is to build defense towers along the enemies' path to keep them from reaching a hut, or base. Several small creatures dwell at the base. For each enemy that survives the defense towers and reaches the hut, one offspring is killed. If all offspring are wiped out, the level is failed.

Towers have distinct attributes, such as rapid fire, long range, air-focused, etc. Destroyed enemies usually drop coins and occasionally give gems, which then can be used to upgrade and research new towers.

There are a total of 21 different levels (36 with the expansion pack) at 3 stages of difficulty. There are also 3 special stages that unlock unique abilities for the player character. Several "Trophy Challenges" were also added to the game after a patch.

Unlike more traditional tower defense games, the player controls a character around the screen, collecting coins and building towers. This replaces the standard cursor controls. A second player can also join in and assist in building towers.

== Encore ==
The PixelJunk Monsters Encore expansion pack includes an additional 15 levels, including layouts inspired by classic arcade games such as Pac-Man and Space Invaders. There are also small tweaks to gameplay; for instance, the ice tower is unlocked at the beginning of every level and the Tesla tower is less expensive to purchase.

== Deluxe ==
A new version of PixelJunk Monsters was available for the PlayStation Portable. Titled PixelJunk Monsters Deluxe, it has been described by Dylan Cuthbert as the "ultimate version" of the game. It contains all of the level content from the original game and its Encore expansion pack, as well as new levels, enemies, and towers. Additional music, videos, concept art, and other special features are also included.

== Soundtrack ==
Dive into PixelJunk Monsters

Studio album by Otograph
- Released: May 22, 2008
- Length: 40:53

The music for the game was developed by Otograph. On May 22, 2008, a soundtrack album for the game titled Dive into PixelJunk Monsters was released via the PlayStation Store. It is the first audio album to be released through PSN.

== Reception ==
The PlayStation 3 version of PixelJunk Monsters, Encore, Deluxe, and the Vita version of Ultimate received "favorable" reviews, while the PC version of Ultimate and the Wii U version of PixelJunk Monsters received "average" reviews, according to the review aggregation website Metacritic.

Reception

Aggregate score
| Aggregator | Score | | | | |
| Aggregator | PC | PS Vita | PS3 | PSP | Wii U |
|---|---|---|---|---|---|
| Metacritic | 72/100 | 84/100 | 83/100 (E.) 82/100 | 86/100 | 73/100 |

Review scores
| Publication | Score | | | | |
| Publication | PC | PS Vita | PS3 | PSP | Wii U |
|---|---|---|---|---|---|
| 1Up.com | N/A | N/A | A | A | N/A |
| Destructoid | N/A | N/A | N/A | 9/10 | N/A |
| Edge | N/A | N/A | 7/10 | N/A | N/A |
| Eurogamer | N/A | N/A | 8/10 | N/A | N/A |
| GamePro | N/A | N/A | 4.5/5 | N/A | N/A |
| GameSpot | N/A | N/A | 7.5/10 (E.) 7/10 | 8/10 | N/A |
| GameZone | N/A | N/A | 8/10 | 9/10 | N/A |
| IGN | N/A | 9/10 | 8.5/10 (E.) 7.9/10 | 9/10 | N/A |
| Nintendo Life | N/A | N/A | N/A | N/A | 8/10 |
| PlayStation Official Magazine – UK | N/A | 8/10 | 7/10 | 8/10 | N/A |
| The A.V. Club | N/A | N/A | B | N/A | N/A |
