= Mark Broom =

British techno DJ and music producer

Mark Broom (born 6 May 1971) is a British techno DJ and music producer.

== Life and career ==
During the Second Summer of Love in 1989 Broom was travelling to Tenerife, where he first heard music genres like Chicago house and Acid house. At his return to the UK he bought his first turntables and started his musical career. He regularly visited the London record store FatCat Records and was introduced to Baby Ford as well as Ed Handley and Andy Turner from Black Dog Productions. Broom became a DJ in Ford's club Nude. Together with Handley and Turner he released a few records for General Production Recordings.

While Broom first was mainly associated with intelligent techno, he later focussed on dancefloor oriented productions. Broom and fellow musician Dave Hill in 1994 founded Pure Plastic Recordings, through which Broom's debut album Angie Is A Shoplifter was released in 1996. Broom, Hill, Handley and Turner released one album and several singles under the name Repeat.

== Discography (selected) ==
Albums

- 1995: Repeat – Repeats (A13)
- 1996: Mark Broom – Angie Is A Shoplifter (Pure Plastic)
- 1998: Rue East – Summer of Blood (Pure Plastic)
- 2001: Rue East – Indoor Culture
- 2010: Mark Broom – Acid House (Saved Records)
- 2021: Mark Broom – Fünfzig (Rekids)
