= List of PlayStation 3 games (Q–Z) =

tok There are currently 2304 games in this table across all pages: A to C, D to I, J to P, and Q to Z. It does not include PlayStation minis, PS one Classics or PS2 Classics.

Key
3D Stereoscopic 3-D	M PlayStation Move optional M required	SV SimulView	F2P Free-to-play	E PlayStation Eye	D Digital only games

Title	Developer(s)	Release date			Options	Ref.
Title	Developer(s)	JP	PAL	NA	Options	Ref.
Q*bert	Sony Online Entertainment	Unreleased	April 27, 2007	February 22, 2007		
Q*bert Rebooted	Loot Interactive	Unreleased	February 18, 2015	February 17, 2015		
Q.U.B.E. Director's Cut	Toxic Games	Unreleased	July 22, 2015	July 21, 2015		
Qlione	Rockin' Android	Unreleased	December 7, 2010	December 7, 2010		
Qlione 2	Rockin' Android	Unreleased	December 7, 2010	December 7, 2010		
Quantum Conundrum	Airtight Games	July 24, 2012	July 11, 2012	July 10, 2012		
Quantum Theory	Team Tachyon	September 30, 2010	September 24, 2010	September 28, 2010		
Quiplash	Jackbox Games	Unreleased	September 15, 2015	June 30, 2015		
Quizball Goal	Pixel Tales	Unreleased	February 22, 2012	Unreleased		
R-Type Dimensions (R-Type & R-Type II)	Tozai Games	November 21, 2013	May 21, 2014	May 20, 2014		
R.B.I. Baseball 14	MLBAM	Unreleased	Unreleased	April 9, 2014		
R.I.P.D. Rest in Peace Department the Game	Saber Interactive	Unreleased	July 31, 2013	July 16, 2013		
R.U.S.E.	Eugen Systems	October 21, 2010	September 10, 2010	September 7, 2010	M	
Ra.One: The Game	Trine Games	Unreleased	October 6, 2011	Unreleased		
Race Driver: GRID	Codemasters	January 15, 2009	May 30, 2008	June 3, 2008		
Race Driver: GRID 2	Codemasters	July 25, 2013	May 31, 2013	May 28, 2013		
Race the Sun	Flippfly	Unreleased	October 22, 2014	October 21, 2014		
Racquet Sports	Asobo Studio	Unreleased	September 14, 2010	September 14, 2010	M	
Rag Doll Kung Fu: Fists of Plastic	Tarsier Studios	April 16, 2009	April 9, 2009	April 9, 2009		
Rage	id Software	Unreleased	October 7, 2011	October 4, 2011		
Ragnarok Odyssey ACE	Game Arts	October 29, 2013	April 30, 2014	April 1, 2014		
Raiden IV: Overkill	Curve Digital	May 13, 2014	May 28, 2014	April 29, 2014		
Railfan: Chicago Transit Authority Brown Line	Ongakukan / Taito	December 21, 2006	Unreleased	Unreleased		
Railfan: Taiwan High Speed Rail	Ongakukan / Actainment	July 12, 2007	Unreleased	Unreleased		
Rain	Sony Computer Entertainment	June 5, 2014	Unreleased	October 1, 2013		
Rainbow Moon	SideQuest Studios	April 3, 2014	July 4, 2012	July 10, 2012		
Rainbow Skies	SideQuest Studios	Unreleased	June 27, 2018	June 26, 2018		
Rambo: The Video Game	Teyon	Unreleased	February 21, 2014	April 29, 2014	M	
Rampage World Tour	Sony Online Entertainment	Unreleased	June 22, 2007	May 17, 2007		
Rampart	Sony Online Entertainment	Unreleased	June 15, 2007	May 10, 2007		
Rango	id Software	Unreleased	March 10, 2011	March 1, 2011		
Rapala Fishing Frenzy 2009	Fun Labs	Unreleased	October 17, 2008	September 2, 2008		
Rapala Pro Bass Fishing	Fun Labs	Unreleased	October 29, 2010	September 28, 2010	M	
Ratatouille	Heavy Iron Studios	November 22, 2007	September 28, 2007	October 23, 2007		
Ratchet & Clank Future: A Crack in Time	Insomniac Games	November 19, 2009	November 4, 2009	October 27, 2009		
Ratchet & Clank Future: Quest for Booty	Insomniac Games	Unreleased	August 21, 2008	August 21, 2008		
Ratchet & Clank Future: Tools of Destruction	Insomniac Games	November 11, 2007	October 23, 2007	October 23, 2007		
Ratchet & Clank HD	Idol Minds	August 28, 2012	August 28, 2012	August 28, 2012		
Ratchet & Clank: All 4 One	Insomniac Games	October 20, 2011	October 21, 2011	October 18, 2011	3D	
Ratchet & Clank: Full Frontal Assault •Ratchet and Clank: Q-Force^{EU}	Insomniac Games	Unreleased	November 28, 2012	November 28, 2012	3D	
Ratchet & Clank: Going Commando	Idol Minds	August 28, 2012	August 28, 2012	August 28, 2012		
Ratchet & Clank: Into the Nexus	Insomniac Games	Unreleased	November 15, 2013	November 15, 2013		
Ratchet & Clank: Up Your Arsenal	Idol Minds	August 28, 2012	August 28, 2012	August 28, 2012		
Ratchet: Deadlocked	Idol Minds	May 21, 2013	May 21, 2013	May 21, 2013		
Rayman 3 HD	Ubisoft	Unreleased	March 20, 2012	March 20, 2012		
Rayman Origins	Ubisoft Montpellier	April 12, 2012	November 25, 2011	November 25, 2011		
Rayman Legends	Ubisoft Montpellier	Unreleased	November 8, 2013	November 8, 2013		
RayStorm HD	Taito	May 6, 2010	Unreleased	Unreleased		
Real Steel	Yuke's Co. Ltd.	October 18, 2011	October 12, 2011	October 18, 2011		
Realms of Ancient War	Wizarbox	April 25, 2013	September 19, 2012	September 25, 2012		
Record of Agarest War	Idea Factory	September 27, 2007	October 16, 2009	April 27, 2010		
Record of Agarest War Zero	Idea Factory	June 25, 2009	August 19, 2011	June 14, 2011		
Record of Agarest War 2	Idea Factory	October 18, 2010	June 26, 2012	October 31, 2012		
Red Baron Arcade	Stainless Studios	Unreleased	Unreleased	March 12, 2009		
Red Dead Redemption	Rockstar San Diego	October 7, 2010	May 21, 2010	May 18, 2010		
Red Faction Collection (Red Faction PS2)	Volition Inc.	Unreleased	March 14, 2014	April 29, 2014		
Red Faction: Armageddon	Volition	June 9, 2011	June 10, 2011	June 7, 2011		
Red Faction: Battlegrounds	THQ Digital Warrington	April 20, 2011	April 6, 2011	April 5, 2011	3D	
Red Faction: Guerrilla	Volition	Unreleased	June 5, 2009	June 2, 2009		
Red Johnson's Chronicles	Lexis Numérique	January 12, 2012	April 20, 2011	June 2, 2011		
Red Johnson's Chronicles – One Against All	Lexis Numérique	Unreleased	September 12, 2012	September 11, 2012		
Remember Me	Dontnod Entertainment	Unreleased	June 7, 2013	June 4, 2013		
Renegade Ops	Avalanche Studios	August 22, 2012	September 14, 2011	September 13, 2011		
Resident Evil 4 HD	Capcom	March 13, 2012	September 21, 2011	September 20, 2011		
Resident Evil 5	Capcom	March 5, 2009	March 13, 2009	March 13, 2009	M	
Resident Evil 6	Capcom	November 22, 2012	November 20, 2012	November 20, 2012		
Resident Evil 6 Anthology Edition (Resident Evil: Director's Cut, Resident Evil 2, Resident Evil 3: Nemesis)	Capcom	Unreleased	Unreleased	October 2, 2012		
Resident Evil – Code: Veronica X HD	Capcom	March 13, 2012	September 28, 2011	September 27, 2011		
Resident Evil: Operation Raccoon City	Slant Six Games / Capcom	April 26, 2012	March 23, 2012	March 20, 2012		
Resident Evil: Revelations	Capcom	May 23, 2013	May 24, 2013	May 21, 2013		
Resident Evil: Revelations 2	Capcom	March 18, 2015	March 20, 2015	March 18, 2015		
Resident Evil: HD Remaster	Capcom	November 27, 2014	January 20, 2015	January 20, 2015		
Resident Evil 0: HD Remaster	Capcom	January 21, 2016	January 19, 2016	January 19, 2016		
Resident Evil: The Darkside Chronicles	Capcom	June 28, 2012	June 26, 2012	June 26, 2012	M	
Resident Evil: The Umbrella Chronicles	Capcom	June 28, 2012	June 26, 2012	June 26, 2012	M	
Resistance: Fall of Man	Insomniac Games	November 11, 2006	March 23, 2007	November 17, 2006		
Resistance 2	Insomniac Games	December 13, 2008	November 28, 2008	November 4, 2008		
Resistance 3	Insomniac Games	September 8, 2011	September 9, 2011	September 6, 2011	3D M	
Resogun	Climax Studios	January 22, 2015	December 17, 2014	December 23, 2014		
Resonance of Fate	tri-Ace	January 28, 2010	March 26, 2010	March 16, 2010		
Retro City Rampage	Vblank Entertainment	Unreleased	January 16, 2013	October 9, 2012		
Retro City Rampage: DX (Note: update for Retro City Rampage.)	Vblank Entertainment	Unreleased	January 16, 2013	October 9, 2012		
Retro/Grade	24 Caret Games	Unreleased	November 11, 2014	November 11, 2014		
Revenant Saga	Kemco	April 6, 2017	Unreleased	May 9, 2017		
Revenge of the Wounded Dragons	Wanako Games	Unreleased	February 18, 2010	December 10, 2009		
Rewrite	Key / Prototype	February 11, 2015	Unreleased	Unreleased		
Ricochet HD	TikGames	Unreleased	February 9, 2011	January 4, 2011		
Ride	Milestone srl	Unreleased	March 27, 2015	October 6, 2015		
Ride to Hell: Retribution	Deep Silver	Unreleased	June 28, 2013	June 25, 2013		
Ridge Racer 7 •Ridge Racer 7: 3D (Note: update for Ridge Racer 7.)	Namco Bandai	November 11, 2006	March 23, 2007	November 13, 2006	3D	
Ridge Racer Unbounded	Bugbear Entertainment	Unreleased	March 30, 2012	March 27, 2012		
Rinne no Lagrange: Kamogawa Days Game & OVA Hybrid Disc	Namco Bandai	October 23, 2012	Unreleased	Unreleased		
Rio	Eurocom	April 12, 2011	April 12, 2011	April 12, 2011		
Rise of the Argonauts	Liquid Entertainment	Unreleased	February 6, 2009	December 16, 2008		
Rise of the Guardians: The Video Game	Torus Games	Unreleased	November 30, 2012	November 20, 2012		
Risen 2: Dark Waters	Piranha Bytes	February 28, 2013	August 3, 2012	July 31, 2012		
Risen 3: Titan Lords	Piranha Bytes	Unreleased	August 15, 2014	August 15, 2014		
Risk	Zoë Mode	Unreleased	April 30, 2015	April 28, 2015		
Risk: Factions	Stainless Games	Unreleased	December 22, 2010	December 21, 2010		
Risk: Urban Assault	Zoë Mode	Unreleased	August 2, 2016	August 2, 2016		
River City Super Sports Challenge: All Stars Special	Arc Entertainment	March 5, 2015	October 28, 2015	October 28, 2015		
Robot Rescue Revolution	Teyon	October 30, 2014	December 4, 2013	Unreleased		
Robotics;Notes	5pb. / Nitroplus	June 28, 2012	Unreleased	Unreleased		
Rochard	Recoil Games	Unreleased	September 28, 2011	September 27, 2011		
Rock Band	Harmonix Music Systems	Unreleased	September 12, 2008	November 20, 2007		
Rock Band 2	Harmonix Music Systems	Unreleased	March 27, 2009	October 19, 2008		
Rock Band 3	Harmonix Music Systems	Unreleased	October 29, 2010	October 26, 2010		
Rock Band Blitz	Harmonix	Unreleased	August 29, 2012	August 28, 2012		
Rock Band Classic Rock Track Pack (Note: stand-alone expansion for Rock Band.)	Harmonix Music Systems	Unreleased	Unreleased	May 19, 2009		
Rock Band Country Track Pack (Note: stand-alone expansion for Rock Band.)	Harmonix Music Systems	Unreleased	Unreleased	July 21, 2009		
Rock Band Country Track Pack 2 (Note: stand-alone expansion for Rock Band.)	Harmonix Music Systems	Unreleased	Unreleased	February 1, 2011		
Rock Band Metal Track Pack (Note: stand-alone expansion for Rock Band.)	Harmonix Music Systems	Unreleased	Unreleased	September 22, 2009		
Rock Band Track Pack Volume 2 (Note: stand-alone expansion for Rock Band.)	Harmonix Music Systems	Unreleased	April 19, 2009	November 18, 2008		
Rock of Ages	ACE Team	October 9, 2013	August 1, 2012	May 15, 2012		
Rock of the Dead	Epicenter Studios	Unreleased	Unreleased	October 19, 2010		
Rock Revolution	Zoë Mode	Unreleased	May 15, 2009	October 15, 2008		
Rocket Knight	Climax Studios	May 12, 2010	May 12, 2010	May 18, 2010		
Rocketbirds: Hardboiled Chicken	Ratloop	November 24, 2011	October 19, 2011	October 18, 2011	3D	
Rocketmen: Axis of Evil	A.C.R.O.N.Y.M. Games	Unreleased	April 25, 2008	February 7, 2008		
Rocketmen: It Came from Uranus (Note: DLC for Rocketmen: Axis of Evil.)	A.C.R.O.N.Y.M. Games	Unreleased	October 9, 2008	May 15, 2008		
Rocksmith	Ubisoft Montreal	Unreleased	September 14, 2012	October 18, 2011		
Rocksmith 2014	Ubisoft San Francisco	Unreleased	October 24, 2013	October 22, 2013		
Rogue Legacy	Cellar Door Games	April 8, 2015	July 30, 2014	July 29, 2014		
Rogue Warrior	Zombie Studios / Rebellion Developments	Unreleased	November 27, 2009	December 1, 2009		
Root Double: Before Crime * After Days Xtend edition	Yeti	October 24, 2013	Unreleased	Unreleased		
Rotastic	Focus Home Interactive	Unreleased	December 5, 2012	December 4, 2012		
Rozen Maiden: Wechseln Sie Welt ab	5pb.	January 30, 2014	Unreleased	Unreleased		
Rugby 15	HB Studios Multimedia	Unreleased	January 23, 2015	February 24, 2015		
Rugby Challenge	Sidhe Interactive	Unreleased	November 14, 2012	Unreleased		
Rugby Challenge 2	Sidhe Interactive	Unreleased	June 7, 2013	Unreleased		
Rugby Challenge 3	Sidhe Interactive	Unreleased	April 22, 2016	April 22, 2016		
Rugby League Live	Big Ant Studios	Unreleased	October 27, 2010	Unreleased		
Rugby League Live 2	Big Ant Studios	Unreleased	October 9, 2012	Unreleased		
Rugby League Live 3	Big Ant Studios	September 24, 2014	September 24, 2014	September 24, 2014		
Rugby World Cup 2011	Big Ant Studios	Unreleased	October 26, 2011	September 6, 2011		
Rugby World Cup 2015	Big Ant Studios	Unreleased	September 4, 2015	September 4, 2015		
Rui Ha Tomo Wo Yobu	5pb.	September 26, 2013	Unreleased	Unreleased		
Rune Factory: Tides of Destiny	Neverland Co.	February 24, 2011	May 25, 2012	October 11, 2011	M	
Rush'n Attack: Ex-Patriot	Vatra Games	Unreleased	April 13, 2011	March 29, 2011		
Rust Buccaneers	Pixolane	Unreleased	December 18, 2013	Unreleased		
Ryū ga Gotoku 1&2 HD edition	Sega	November 1, 2012	Unreleased	Unreleased		
Ryū ga Gotoku Ishin!	Sega	February 22, 2014	Unreleased	Unreleased		
Ryū ga Gotoku Kenzan!	Amusement Vision	March 6, 2008	Unreleased	Unreleased		
Ryū ga Gotoku Kiwami	Sega	January 21, 2016	Unreleased	Unreleased		
Ryū ga Gotoku Zero: Chikai no Basho	Sega	March 12, 2015	Unreleased	Unreleased		
The Saboteur	Pandemic Studios	Unreleased	December 4, 2009	December 8, 2009		
Sackboy's Prehistoric Moves	Media Molecule; Supermassive Games	Unreleased	December 8, 2010	December 7, 2010	M	
Sacra Terra: Kiss of Death	Alawar	Unreleased	July 2, 2014	July 8, 2014		
Sacred 2: Fallen Angel	Ascaron Entertainment	Unreleased	June 5, 2009	May 12, 2009		
Sacred 3	Keen Games	August 28, 2013	August 1, 2013	August 22, 2013		
Sacred Citadel	Southend Interactive	Unreleased	April 17, 2013	April 16, 2013		
Saikyo Shogi Gekisashi 13	Mynavi	December 16, 2010	Unreleased	Unreleased		
Saint Seiya: Brave Soldiers	Dimps Corporation	August 17, 2013	November 22, 2013	November 26, 2013		
Saint Seiya: Sanctuary Battle	Dimps Corporation	November 23, 2011	March 16, 2012	May 16, 2012		
Saint Seiya: Soldiers' Soul	Dimps Corporation	September 25, 2015	September 25, 2015	September 25, 2015		
Saints Row 2	Volition	December 4, 2008	October 17, 2008	October 14, 2008		
Saints Row: The Third	Volition	November 17, 2011	November 18, 2011	November 15, 2011		
Saints Row IV	Volition	Unreleased	August 23, 2013	August 20, 2013		
Saints Row: Gat out of Hell (Note: stand-alone expansion for Saints Row IV.)	Volition	Unreleased	January 20, 2015	January 20, 2015		
Sakatsuku: Pro Soccer Club o Tsukurou!	Sega	October 10, 2013	Unreleased	Unreleased		
Sakigake!! Otoko Juku: Nihonyo Korega Otoko Dearu	Bandai Namco Games	February 27, 2014	Unreleased	Unreleased		
Sam & Max Beyond Time and Space	Telltale Games	Unreleased	November 30, 2011	October 18, 2011		
Sam & Max: The Devil's Playhouse	Telltale Games	Unreleased	April 15, 2010	April 15, 2010		
Samurai Warriors 4	Omega Force	March 20, 2014	November 19, 2014	October 21, 2014		
Samurai Warriors 4 Empires (Note: stand-alone expansion for Samurai Warriors 4.)	Omega Force	September 17, 2015	April 8, 2016	March 15, 2016		
Samurai Warriors 4-II (Note: update for Samurai Warriors 4.)	Omega Force	February 11, 2015	October 30, 2015	September 29, 2015		
San Goku Shi 12	Koei	December 13, 2012	Unreleased	Unreleased		
San Goku Shi 13	Koei	January 1, 2016	Unreleased	Unreleased		
Sanctum 2	Coffee Stain Studios	Unreleased	October 16, 2013	September 10, 2013		
Sangokushi 12 Taisenban	Koei Tecmo	September 26, 2013	Unreleased	Unreleased		
Savage Moon	FluffyLogic	Unreleased	December 24, 2008	January 29, 2009		
Saw	Zombie Studios	Unreleased	December 3, 2009	October 6, 2009		
Saw II	Zombie Studios	Unreleased	November 26, 2010	October 19, 2010		
SBK-08: Superbike World Championship	Milestone	Unreleased	September 26, 2008	March 3, 2009		
SBK-09: Superbike World Championship	Milestone	Unreleased	May 29, 2009	Unreleased		
SBK 2011: Superbike World Championship	Milestone	Unreleased	May 13, 2011	Unreleased		
SBK Generations	Milestone	Unreleased	June 1, 2012	Unreleased		
SBK X: Superbike World Championship	Milestone	Unreleased	October 19, 2010	June 4, 2010		
Scarygirl	TikGames	Unreleased	February 15, 2012	January 24, 2012		
Scene It? Bright Lights! Big Screen!	Artificial Mind and Movement	Unreleased	December 4, 2009	November 17, 2009		
Scene It? Movie Night	Sarbakan	Unreleased	Unreleased	November 29, 2011		
Schlag den Raab: Das 2. Spiel	Sproing	Unreleased	October 21, 2011	Unreleased		
Schlag den Raab: Das 3. Spiel	Sproing	Unreleased	September 11, 2012	Unreleased		
SCORE International Baja 1000	Left Field Productions	Unreleased	November 21, 2008	October 28, 2008		
Scott Pilgrim vs. the World: The Game	Ubisoft Montreal	October 20, 2010	August 11, 2010	August 10, 2010		
Scourge: Outbreak	Tragnarion Studios	Unreleased	Unreleased	December 9, 2014		
The Secret of Monkey Island: Special Edition	LucasArts	Unreleased	June 23, 2010	April 20, 2010		
Section 8	TimeGate Studios	March 25, 2010	March 25, 2010	March 25, 2010		
Section 8: Prejudice	TimeGate Studios	July 26, 2011	July 26, 2011	July 26, 2011		
Sega Bass Fishing	Sega	October 5, 2011	October 5, 2011	October 4, 2011	M	
Sega Rally Online Arcade	Sega	Unreleased	July 6, 2011	June 2, 2011		
Sega Rally Revo	Sega Racing Studio	January 31, 2008	September 28, 2007	October 9, 2007		
Sega Superstars Tennis	Sumo Digital	March 20, 2008	March 17, 2008	March 18, 2008		
SEGA Vintage Collection: Alex Kidd & Co.	Sega	Unreleased	January 8, 2013	January 8, 2013	D	
SEGA Vintage Collection: Monster World	Sega	Unreleased	January 8, 2013	January 8, 2013	D	
SEGA Vintage Collection: ToeJam & Earl	Sega	Unreleased	March 27, 2013	March 27, 2013	D	
Sekai Saikyou Ginsei Igo: Hybrid Monte Carlo	SilverStar	November 25, 2010	Unreleased	Unreleased		
Sekai Saikyou Ginsei Shogi: Fuuum Ryouko Raiden	SilverStar	April 21, 2011	Unreleased	Unreleased		
Sengoku Basara HD Collection	Capcom	August 29, 2012	Unreleased	Unreleased		
Sengoku Basara: Samurai Heroes •Sengoku Basara 3^{JP}	Capcom	July 29, 2010	October 15, 2010	October 12, 2010		
Sengoku Basara 4	Capcom	January 23, 2014	Unreleased	Unreleased		
Sengoku Basara 4: Sumeragi (Note: stand-alone expansion for Sengoku Basara 4.)	Capcom	July 23, 2015	Unreleased	Unreleased		
Sengoku BASARA Sanada Yukimura-den	Capcom	August 25, 2016	Unreleased	Unreleased		
Sengoku Hime: Senkou no Taika – Akatsuki no Haryuu	Ge-Sen18	July 19, 2012	Unreleased	Unreleased		
Sangoku Hime 2: Kouki Houkou - Mezameshi Taiga	SystemSoft Alpha	August 1, 2013	Unreleased	Unreleased		
Sengoku Hime 3: Tenka o Kirisaku Hikari to Kage	Ge-Sen18	December 20, 2012	Unreleased	Unreleased		
Sengoku Hime 4: Souha Hyakkei, Hana Mamoru Chikai	Ge-Sen18	February 27, 2014	Unreleased	Unreleased		
Sengoku Hime 5: Senkatatsu Haoh no Keifu	Ge-Sen18	March 26, 2015	Unreleased	Unreleased		
Sengoku Musou 2 Empires HD Version (Note: stand-alone expansion for Sengoku Musou 2.)	Omega Force	October 24, 2013	Unreleased	Unreleased		
Sengoku Musou 2 with Moushouden HD Version (Note: update for Sengoku Musou 2.)	Omega Force	October 24, 2013	Unreleased	Unreleased		
Sengoku Musou 3 Empires (Note: stand-alone expansion for Sengoku Musou 3 Z.)	Omega Force	August 26, 2011	Unreleased	Unreleased		
Sengoku Musou 3 Z (Note: update for Sengoku Musou 3.)	Omega Force	February 10, 2011	Unreleased	Unreleased		
Sengoku Musou: Sanada Maru	Omega Force	November 23, 2016	Unreleased	Unreleased		
Serious Sam 3: BFE	Croteam	Unreleased	May 14, 2014	May 13, 2014		
Shadow of the Colossus	Bluepoint Games	September 22, 2011	December 21, 2011	January 17, 2012	3D	
Shadows of the Damned	Grasshopper Manufacture	September 22, 2011	June 24, 2011	June 21, 2011		
Shakedown: Hawaii	Vblank Entertainment	August 20, 2020	August 20, 2020	August 20, 2020		
Shake Spears!	Alawar	Unreleased	November 12, 2014	December 23, 2014		
Shank	Klei Entertainment	Unreleased	August 25, 2010	August 24, 2010		
Shank 2	Klei Entertainment	Unreleased	February 8, 2012	February 7, 2012		
Sharin no Kuni, Himawari no Shoujo	Akabeisoft2	February 28, 2013	Unreleased	Unreleased		
Shatter	Sidhe Interactive	Unreleased	July 23, 2009	July 23, 2009		
Shaun White Skateboarding	Ubisoft Montreal	November 25, 2010	October 29, 2010	October 26, 2010	3D	
Shaun White Snowboarding	Ubisoft Montreal	Unreleased	November 14, 2008	November 16, 2008		
Shellshock 2: Blood Trails	Rebellion Developments	Unreleased	February 13, 2009	February 24, 2009		
Sherlock Holmes: Crimes & Punishments	Frogwares	Unreleased	October 3, 2014	September 30, 2014		
Sheryl Nome: Super-Dimensional Virtual Clip ~Sagittarius 9 PM (Don't Be Late)~ (app)	Bandai Namco	2013	Unreleased	Unreleased		
Shift 2: Unleashed	Slightly Mad Studios	Unreleased	April 1, 2011	March 29, 2011		
Shiki-Tei	Japan Studio	June 26, 2008	Unreleased	Unreleased		
Shin Hayarigami	Nippon Ichi	October 7, 2014	Unreleased	Unreleased		
Shin Hayarigami 2	Nippon Ichi	July 7, 2016	Unreleased	Unreleased		
Shin Kamaitachi no Yoru	Chunsoft	December 7, 2011	Unreleased	Unreleased		
Shin Koihime Musou: Otome Taisen * Sangokushi Engi	BaseSon	February 20, 2014	Unreleased	Unreleased		
Shin Sangoku Musou Online Z (Note: update for Dynasty Warriors Online.)	Koei Tecmo Games	July 18, 2013	Unreleased	Unreleased		
Shin Sangoku Musou Online: Ryuujin Ranbu (Note: update for Dynasty Warriors Online.)	Koei Tecmo Games	March 15, 2012	Unreleased	Unreleased		
Shin Sangoku Musou Online: Souten Ranbu (Note: update for Dynasty Warriors Online.)	Koei Tecmo Games	November 11, 2011	Unreleased	Unreleased		
Shining Resonance	Sega	December 15, 2014	Unreleased	Unreleased		
Shin Toudai Shogi	Unknown	December 22, 2011	Unreleased	Unreleased		
Shoot Many Robots	Demiurge Studios	Unreleased	March 14, 2012	March 13, 2012		
Short Peace: Ranko Tsukigime's Longest Day	Grasshopper Manufacture	January 16, 2014	April 18, 2014	September 30, 2014		
Shovel Knight	Yacht Club Games	Unreleased	April 23, 2015	April 21, 2015		
Shrek Forever After	XPEC	Unreleased	June 18, 2010	May 18, 2010		
Shuukan Toro Station	Japan Studio	November 11, 2009	Unreleased	Unreleased		
Shutsugeki!! Otometachi no Senjou 2: Yuukoku o Kakeru Koujo no Tsubasa	SystemSoft Alpha	June 21, 2012	Unreleased	Unreleased		
Sideway: New York	Playbrains	Unreleased	October 12, 2011	October 11, 2011		
Silent Hill: Downpour	Vatra Games	Unreleased	March 30, 2012	March 13, 2012	3D	
Silent Hill HD Collection	Hijinx Studios	March 29, 2012	March 16, 2012	March 20, 2012		
Silent Hill: Homecoming	Double Helix Games / Konami Digital Entertainment	Unreleased	February 27, 2009	September 30, 2008		
The Simpsons Game	EA Redwood Shores	Unreleased	November 9, 2007	October 30, 2007		
The Sims 3	Maxis / Edge of Reality	November 18, 2010	October 29, 2010	October 26, 2010		
The Sims 3: Pets	Maxis	Unreleased	October 21, 2011	October 18, 2011		
Sine Mora	Grasshopper Manufacture	Unreleased	November 21, 2012	November 20, 2012		
SingOn	SingOn Ltd	Unreleased	April 16, 2014	Unreleased		
SingStar	London Studio	Unreleased	December 7, 2007	May 20, 2008	E	
SingStar (2014) (Note: update for SingStar.)	London Studio	Unreleased	October 28, 2014	October 28, 2014		
SingStar ABBA	London Studio	Unreleased	November 14, 2008	December 2, 2008		
SingStar Apres-Ski Party 2	London Studio	Unreleased	December 3, 2010	Unreleased		
SingStar Back to the 80s	London Studio	Unreleased	October 28, 2011	Unreleased		
SingStar Chartbreaker	London Studio	Unreleased	December 4, 2009	Unreleased		
SingStar Chart Hits	London Studio	Unreleased	July 1, 2010	Unreleased		
SingStar Dance	London Studio	Unreleased	September 9, 2010	November 9, 2010	M	
SingStar Danish Hits	London Studio	Unreleased	February 16, 2011	Unreleased		
SingStar Digital	London Studio	Unreleased	November 13, 2012	November 13, 2012		
SingStar Finnish Hits	London Studio	Unreleased	August 1, 2010	Unreleased		
SingStar Frozen	London Studio	Unreleased	December 17, 2014	Unreleased		
SingStar Fussballhits	London Studio	Unreleased	June 11, 2010	Unreleased		
SingStar Grandes Éxitos	London Studio	Unreleased	November 10, 2011	Unreleased		
SingStar Guitar	London Studio	Unreleased	October 15, 2010	Unreleased		
SingStar Hits	London Studio	Unreleased	November 19, 2008	November 19, 2008		
SingStar Hits 2	London Studio	Unreleased	November 19, 2008	November 19, 2008		
SingStar Kent	London Studio	Unreleased	May 26, 2010	May 26, 2010		
SingStar Latino	London Studio	Unreleased	Unreleased	November 18, 2009		
Singstar Made in Germany	London Studio	Unreleased	November 6, 2009	Unreleased		
SingStar Mallorca Party	London Studio	Unreleased	July 9, 2009	Unreleased		
SingStar Mecano	London Studio	Unreleased	November 19, 2009	Unreleased		
SingStar: Morangos com Acucar	London Studio	Unreleased	January 1, 2008	Unreleased		
SingStar Motown	London Studio	Unreleased	September 18, 2009	Unreleased		
SingStar Patito Feo	London Studio	Unreleased	December 1, 2010	Unreleased		
SingStar: Polskie Hity	London Studio	Unreleased	September 2, 2009	Unreleased		
SingStar Pop Edition	London Studio	Unreleased	April 24, 2009	Unreleased		
SingStar Portugal Hits	London Studio	Unreleased	July 17, 2010	Unreleased		
SingStar Queen	London Studio	Unreleased	March 20, 2009	August 18, 2009		
SingStar Studio 100	London Studio	Unreleased	November 12, 2010	Unreleased		
SingStar SuomiHuiput	London Studio	Unreleased	November 28, 2012	Unreleased		
SingStar Take That	London Studio	Unreleased	October 23, 2009	Unreleased		
SingStar Ultimate Party	London Studio	Unreleased	August 28, 2014	Unreleased		
SingStar Vol. 2	London Studio	Unreleased	June 20, 2008	October 28, 2008	E	
SingStar Vol. 3: Party Edition	London Studio	Unreleased	November 14, 2008	Unreleased		
SingStar Vasco	London Studio	Unreleased	November 18, 2009	Unreleased		
SingStar: The Wiggles	London Studio	Unreleased	November 25, 2010	Unreleased		
Singularity	Raven Software	Unreleased	June 25, 2010	June 29, 2010		
Siren: Blood Curse	Japan Studio	July 24, 2008	July 24, 2008	July 24, 2008		
Skate	EA Black Box	March 13, 2008	October 12, 2007	September 24, 2007		
Skate 2	EA Black Box	February 12, 2009	January 23, 2009	January 21, 2009		
Skate 3	EA Black Box	Unreleased	May 14, 2010	May 11, 2010		
Ski-Doo: Snowmobile Challenge	ColdWood Interactive	Unreleased	Unreleased	March 6, 2009		
Skullgirls	Lab Zero Games	February 14, 2013	May 2, 2012	April 10, 2012		
Skullgirls Encore (Note: update for Skullgirls.)	Lab Zero Games	Unreleased	February 11, 2014	February 11, 2014		
Skydive: Proximity Flight	Gaijin Entertainment	Unreleased	October 1, 2013	October 1, 2013	3D	
Sky Diving or Go! Sports Skydiving	Bergsala Lightweight	January 10, 2008	February 7, 2008	February 7, 2008		
Sky Fighter	Creat Studios	Unreleased	September 22, 2010	November 16, 2010		
Sky Force Anniversary	Infinite Dreams Inc.	Unreleased	September 7, 2016	September 6, 2016		
SkyDrift	Digital Reality	Unreleased	September 7, 2011	September 6, 2011		
Skylanders: Spyro's Adventure	Toys for Bob	July 12, 2013	October 14, 2011	October 16, 2011		
Skylanders: Giants	Toys for Bob	Unreleased	October 19, 2012	October 21, 2012		
Skylanders: Imaginators	Vicarious Visions	Unreleased	October 14, 2016	October 16, 2016		
Skylanders: Swap Force	Vicarious Visions	Unreleased	October 18, 2013	October 13, 2013		
Skylanders: SuperChargers	Vicarious Visions	Unreleased	September 25, 2015	September 20, 2015		
Skylanders: Trap Team	Vicarious Visions	Unreleased	October 10, 2014	October 5, 2014		
Slam Bolt Scrappers	Fire Hose Games	Unreleased	March 16, 2011	March 15, 2011		
Sleeping Dogs	United Front Games	September 27, 2012	August 20, 2012	August 17, 2012		
Slender: The Arrival	Blue Isle Studios	Unreleased	September 24, 2014	September 23, 2014		
Slotter Chou Mania: Antonio Inoki ga Genki ni Suru Pachi-Slot Ki	Dorart	March 31, 2011	Unreleased	Unreleased		
Sly 2: Band of Thieves	Sanzaru Games	Unreleased	December 7, 2011	November 29, 2011		
Sly 3: Honor Among Thieves	Sanzaru Games	Unreleased	December 7, 2011	November 29, 2011		
Sly Cooper and the Thievius Raccoonus	Sanzaru Games	Unreleased	December 7, 2011	November 29, 2011		
Sly Cooper: Thieves in Time	Sanzaru Games / Sony Computer Entertainment	Unreleased	March 28, 2013	February 5, 2013	3D	
Smash Cars	Creat Studios	Unreleased	August 27, 2009	August 20, 2009		
Smash Cars: Virus Run (Note: DLC for Smash Cars.)	TikGames	Unreleased	June 16, 2010	June 8, 2010		
Smash 'N' Survive	Version2Games Limited	Unreleased	February 22, 2012	February 22, 2012		
The Smurfs 2	Ubisoft	Unreleased	July 23, 2013	July 23, 2013		
Snakeball	Gamoola Soft	February 7, 2008	January 3, 2008	December 20, 2007	E	
Snark Busters: High Society	Big Fish Games	Unreleased	October 29, 2014	November 4, 2014		
Sniper Elite V2	Rebellion Developments	August 9, 2012	May 4, 2012	May 4, 2012		
Sniper Elite III	Rebellion Developments	Unreleased	June 27, 2014	June 27, 2014		
Sniper: Ghost Warrior	City Interactive	Unreleased	April 28, 2011	June 28, 2011		
Sniper: Ghost Warrior 2	City Interactive	June 27, 2013	March 15, 2013	March 12, 2013		
Snipers	Hydravision Entertainment	Unreleased	March 2, 2012	March 1, 2012		
Snowy: Treasure Hunter	Alawar	Unreleased	August 21, 2013	Unreleased		
SOCOM 4 U.S. Navy SEALs	Zipper Interactive	June 27, 2013	April 21, 2011	April 19, 2011	3D M	
SOCOM U.S. Navy SEALs: Confrontation	Slant Six Games	October 30, 2008	March 13, 2009	October 14, 2008		
Soldier of Fortune: Payback	Cauldron HQ	Unreleased	April 11, 2008	November 19, 2007		
Sonic Adventure	Sonic Team	September 29, 2010	September 22, 2010	September 20, 2010		
Sonic Adventure 2	Sonic Team	October 4, 2012	October 3, 2012	October 2, 2012		
Sonic Generations	Sonic Team	December 1, 2011	November 4, 2011	November 1, 2011	3D	
Sonic & Sega All-Stars Racing	Sumo Digital	Unreleased	February 26, 2010	February 23, 2010		
Sonic & All-Stars Racing Transformed	Sumo Digital	May 15, 2014	November 16, 2012	November 16, 2012		
Sonic the Hedgehog	Sonic Team	December 21, 2006	March 23, 2007	January 30, 2007		
Sonic the Hedgehog (Genesis)	Backbone Entertainment	July 6, 2011	March 29, 2011	March 30, 2011		
Sonic the Hedgehog 2	Sonic Team	July 28, 2011	April 20, 2011	April 19, 2011		
Sonic the Hedgehog 4: Episode I	Sega	October 13, 2010	October 13, 2010	October 12, 2010		
Sonic the Hedgehog 4: Episode II	Sega	May 16, 2012	May 16, 2012	May 15, 2012		
Sonic CD	Sega	Unreleased	December 14, 2011	December 20, 2011		
Sonic the Fighters	Sega	November 28, 2012	December 5, 2012	November 27, 2012		
Sonic's Ultimate Genesis Collection	Backbone Entertainment	Unreleased	February 20, 2009	February 10, 2009		
Sonic Unleashed	Sonic Team	February 19, 2009	November 28, 2008	November 18, 2008		
Sorcery •Lord of Sorcery^{JP}	The Workshop	June 14, 2012	May 25, 2012	May 25, 2012	M	
Soulcalibur II HD Online	Namco	February 20, 2014	November 20, 2013	November 19, 2013		
Soulcalibur IV	Project Soul	July 31, 2008	August 1, 2008	July 29, 2008		
Soulcalibur V	Project Soul	February 2, 2012	February 3, 2012	January 31, 2012		
Soulcalibur: Lost Swords	Project Soul	February 6, 2014	April 23, 2014	April 22, 2014	F2P	
Sound Shapes	SCEA	September 27, 2012	August 15, 2012	August 7, 2012		
South Park: The Stick of Truth	Obsidian Entertainment / South Park Digital Studios	Unreleased	March 7, 2014	March 4, 2014		
Space Ace	Digital Leisure	Unreleased	June 2, 2011	February 22, 2011		
Space Channel 5: Part 2	Sega	October 5, 2011	October 5, 2011	October 4, 2011		
Space Hulk	Full Control	Unreleased	October 23, 2015	September 1, 2015		
Space Invaders Infinity Gene	Taito	September 15, 2010	September 15, 2010	September 14, 2010		
Spare Parts	EA Bright Light	Unreleased	January 19, 2011	January 18, 2011		
Sparkle 2	10tons	Unreleased	Unreleased	March 10, 2015		
Sparkle Unleashed	10tons	Unreleased	June 3, 2015	June 2, 2015		
Spartacus Legends	Kung Fu Factory	June 26, 2013	June 26, 2013	June 26, 2013	F2P	
Spec Ops: The Line	Yager Development	Unreleased	June 29, 2012	June 26, 2012		
Spelunker Black (Note: update for Spelunker HD.)	Irem	January 7, 2010	Unreleased	Unreleased		
Spelunker Collection (Spelunker Classic, Spelunker Console, Spelunker Arcade, Spelunker II)	Tozai Games	January 17, 2013	Unreleased	Unreleased		
Spelunker HD	Irem	March 26, 2009	August 10, 2011	November 23, 2010		
Spelunky	Mossmouth	Unreleased	August 28, 2013	August 27, 2013		
Spider-Man 3	Treyarch	October 17, 2007	May 4, 2007	May 4, 2007		
Spider-Man: Edge of Time	Beenox	Unreleased	October 14, 2011	October 4, 2011		
Spider-Man: Shattered Dimensions	Beenox	Unreleased	September 10, 2010	September 7, 2010		
Spider-Man: Web of Shadows	Treyarch / Shaba Games	Unreleased	October 24, 2008	October 21, 2008		
Splatterhouse	BottleRocket Entertainment / Namco Bandai Games	Unreleased	November 26, 2010	November 23, 2010		
Splice	Cipher Prime	Unreleased	Unreleased	January 20, 2015		
Split/Second: Velocity •Split/Second^{NA}	Black Rock Studio	Unreleased	May 21, 2010	May 18, 2010		
SpongeBob SquarePants: Plankton's Robotic Revenge	Behaviour Interactive	Unreleased	October 11, 2013	October 22, 2013		
Sports Champions	Zindagi Games	December 16, 2010	September 20, 2010	September 20, 2010	M	
Sports Champions 2	Zindagi Games	November 20, 2012	November 2, 2012	November 2, 2012	3D M	
Sportsfriends	Die Gute Fabrik	Unreleased	May 7, 2014	May 6, 2014	M	
Spunland	Madmunki	Unreleased	Unreleased	February 20, 2013		
SSX	EA Canada	March 15, 2012	March 2, 2012	February 28, 2012		
Stacking	Double Fine Productions	Unreleased	February 9, 2011	February 8, 2011		
Star Ocean: The Last Hope International	tri-Ace	February 4, 2010	February 12, 2010	February 9, 2010		
Star Ocean: Integrity and Faithlessness	tri-Ace	February 25, 2016	Unreleased	Unreleased		
Star Ocean: The Second Story	tri-Ace	December 24, 2015	Unreleased	Unreleased		
Star Raiders	Incinerator Studios	Unreleased	June 29, 2011	June 2, 2011		
Star Trek	Digital Extremes	Unreleased	April 26, 2013	April 26, 2013	3D	
Star Trek DAC	Naked Sky Entertainment	Unreleased	December 17, 2009	November 12, 2009		
Star Wars: The Clone Wars – Republic Heroes	Krome Studios	Unreleased	October 6, 2009	October 6, 2009		
Star Wars: The Force Unleashed	LucasArts	Unreleased	September 19, 2008	September 16, 2008		
Star Wars: The Force Unleashed II	LucasArts	Unreleased	October 29, 2010	October 26, 2010		
Star Wars Pinball	Zen Studios	Unreleased	May 15, 2013	May 14, 2013		
StarDrone	Beatshapers	Unreleased	March 2, 2011	April 5, 2011	3D	
Starhawk	LightBox Interactive	Unreleased	July 11, 2012	July 11, 2012		
Starlight Inception	Escape Hatch Entertainment	Unreleased	June 24, 2015	May 19, 2015		
Start the Party	Supermassive Games	Unreleased	September 20, 2010	September 20, 2010	M E	
Start the Party! Save the World	Supermassive Games	Unreleased	September 20, 2010	September 20, 2010	M	
Starwhal	Breakfall	Unreleased	March 4, 2015	February 24, 2015		
Stealth Inc: A Clone in the Dark	Curve Studios	August 26, 2014	July 24, 2013	July 23, 2013		
Stealth Inc 2: A Game of Clones	Curve Studios	Unreleased	April 8, 2015	April 7, 2015		
Steins;Gate	5pb., Nitroplus	August 31, 2015	Unreleased	August 25, 2015		
Steins;Gate: Darling of Loving Vows	5pb.	May 24, 2012	Unreleased	Unreleased		
Steins;Gate: Linear Bounded Phenogram	5pb.	April 25, 2013	Unreleased	Unreleased		
Steins;Gate 0	5pb.	August 31, 2015	Unreleased	Unreleased		
Steredenn	Pixelnest Studio	Unreleased	June 21, 2017	August 15, 2017		
Stick It to the Man!	Zoink!	Unreleased	November 20, 2013	November 19, 2013		
Storm	IndiePub	Unreleased	Unreleased	February 28, 2012		
Stormrise	The Creative Assembly	Unreleased	March 27, 2009	March 24, 2009		
Street Fighter 25th Anniversary Collector Set	Capcom	Unreleased	Unreleased	September 18, 2012		
Street Fighter III: 3rd Strike Online Edition	Capcom	August 23, 2011	August 24, 2011	August 23, 2011		
Street Fighter IV	Capcom / Dimps	February 12, 2009	February 20, 2009	February 17, 2009		
Street Fighter X Tekken	Capcom / Namco	March 8, 2012	March 9, 2012	March 6, 2012		
Streets of Rage 2	Sega	July 28, 2011	June 2, 2011	June 28, 2011		
Strength of the Sword 3	Ivent Games	Unreleased	June 5, 2013	December 10, 2013		
Strider	Capcom	February 22, 2014	Unreleased	Unreleased		
Strong Bad's Cool Game for Attractive People	Telltale Games	Unreleased	March 23, 2011	December 21, 2010		
Stuntman: Ignition	Paradigm Entertainment	February 21, 2008	September 28, 2007	September 17, 2007		
Suigetsu Ni	GN Software	December 22, 2011	Unreleased	Unreleased		
Summer Stars 2012	Maximum Games	Unreleased	Unreleased	July 10, 2012		
Summer Challenge: Athletics Tournament	PQube	Unreleased	September 2, 2011	March 18, 2012		
SuperCar Challenge	Eutechnyx	Unreleased	September 4, 2009	Unreleased		
Super Hang-On	Sega	May 23, 2012	May 23, 2012	May 22, 2012		
Super Hero Generation	Bandai Namco	October 23, 2014	Unreleased	Unreleased		
Super Heroine Chronicle	Bandai Namco Games	February 6, 2014	Unreleased	Unreleased		
Super Mega Baseball	Metalhead Software	Unreleased	April 1, 2015	December 16, 2014		
Super Motherload	XGen Studios	Unreleased	December 4, 2013	November 26, 2013		
Super Puzzle Fighter II Turbo HD Remix	Backbone Entertainment	Unreleased	May 29, 2008	August 30, 2007		
Super Robot Taisen	B.B.Studio	April 24, 2014	Unreleased	Unreleased		
Super Robot Taisen OG Infinite Battle	Bandai Namco	November 28, 2013	Unreleased	Unreleased		
Super Robot Taisen OG: Dark Prison (Note: stand-alone expansion for Dai-2-Ji Super Robot Taisen OG.)	B.B.Studio	November 28, 2013	Unreleased	Unreleased		
Super Robot Wars OG: The Moon Dwellers	Bandai Namco	June 30, 2016	Unreleased	Unreleased		
Super Robot Taisen OG Saga: Masou Kishin F Coffin of The End	Bandai Namco	August 28, 2014	Unreleased	Unreleased		
Super Robot Taisen OG Saga: Masou Kishin III – Pride of Justice	Bandai Namco	August 22, 2013	Unreleased	Unreleased		
Super Rub 'a' Dub	Sumo Digital	May 24, 2007	April 5, 2007	May 3, 2007		
Super Stacker	SparkWorkz	May 25, 2010	Unreleased	Unreleased		
Superstars V8 Next Challenge	Milestone	Unreleased	May 10, 2011	February 26, 2010		
Superstars V8 Racing	Milestone	Unreleased	June 26, 2009	June 1, 2010		
Super Stardust HD	Housemarque	Unreleased	June 29, 2007	June 28, 2007	3D SV	
Super Street Fighter II Turbo HD Remix	Backbone Entertainment	Unreleased	February 19, 2009	November 25, 2008		
Super Street Fighter IV (Note: update for Street Fighter IV.)	Capcom / Dimps	April 28, 2010	April 30, 2010	April 27, 2010		
Super Street Fighter IV: Arcade Edition (Note: update for Super Street Fighter IV.)	Capcom / Dimps	July 30, 2011	July 28, 2011	July 24, 2011		
Superfrog HD	Team17	Unreleased	July 31, 2013	August 6, 2013		
Supersonic Acrobatic Rocket-Powered Battle-Cars	Psyonix	Unreleased	February 12, 2009	October 9, 2008		
Supremacy MMA	Kung Fu Factory	Unreleased	September 23, 2011	September 20, 2011		
Surf's Up	Ubisoft Montreal	Unreleased	August 3, 2007	May 29, 2007		
The Surfer	Bungarra Software Pty Ltd	Unreleased	December 13, 2017	December 13, 2017		
Suzukaze no Melt: Days in the Sanctuary	GN Software	December 15, 2011	Unreleased	Unreleased		
Suzumiya Haruhi no Tsuisou	Bandai Namco Games	May 12, 2011	Unreleased	Unreleased		
Swarm	Hothead Games	March 23, 2011	March 30, 2011	March 22, 2011		
Switchball	Atomic Elbow	Unreleased	February 11, 2010	September 17, 2009		
Swords & Soldiers	Ronimo Games	Unreleased	Unreleased	September 28, 2010	3D M	
Sword Art Online: Lost Song	ArtDink	March 26, 2015	Unreleased	Unreleased		
Syberia	Microïds	Unreleased	December 3, 2014	December 2, 2014		
Syberia II	Microïds	Unreleased	April 1, 2015	April 1, 2015		
Syndicate	Starbreeze Studios	Unreleased	February 24, 2012	February 21, 2012		
Söldner-X: Himmelsstürmer	SideQuest Studios	October 27, 2016	December 18, 2008	December 4, 2008		
Söldner-X 2: Final Prototype	SideQuest Studios	Unreleased	May 26, 2010	May 25, 2010		
Tabletop Cricket	Big Ant Studios	Unreleased	February 25, 2015	March 31, 2015		
Taiheiyou no Arashi: Senkan Yamato, Akatsuki ni Shutsugekisu	System Soft	November 22, 2012	Unreleased	Unreleased		
Tales from Space: About a Blob	DrinkBox Studios	Unreleased	February 9, 2011	February 8, 2011		
Tales from Space: Mutant Blobs Attack	DrinkBox Studios	Unreleased	June 18, 2014	June 17, 2014		
Tales from the Borderlands	Telltale Games	Unreleased	December 3, 2014	November 25, 2014		
Tales of Berseria	Namco Tales Studio	October 18, 2016	Unreleased	Unreleased		
Tales of Graces ƒ	Namco Tales Studio	December 2, 2010	August 31, 2012	March 13, 2012		
Tales of Monkey Island	Telltale Games	Unreleased	June 16, 2010	June 15, 2010		
Tales of Symphonia	Namco Bandai Games	Unreleased	February 28, 2014	February 25, 2014		
Tales of Symphonia: Dawn of the New World	Namco Bandai Games	Unreleased	February 28, 2014	February 25, 2014		
Tales of Vesperia	Namco Tales Studio	September 17, 2009	Unreleased	Unreleased		
Tales of Xillia	Namco Tales Studio	September 8, 2011	August 9, 2013	August 6, 2013		
Tales of Xillia 2	Namco Bandai Games	November 1, 2012	August 22, 2014	August 19, 2014		
Tales of Zestiria	Namco Bandai Games	January 22, 2015	October 16, 2015	October 20, 2015		
Tears to Tiara: Earth's Wreath	Aquaplus / Leaf	July 17, 2008	Unreleased	Unreleased		
Tears to Tiara Side Story: Mystery of Avalon	Aquaplus	September 17, 2009	Unreleased	Unreleased		
Tears to Tiara II: Heir of the Overlord	Aquaplus	October 31, 2013	November 11, 2014	October 14, 2014		
Tecmo Bowl Throwback	Tecmo	Unreleased	Unreleased	June 1, 2010		
Teenage Mutant Ninja Turtles: Danger of the Ooze	WayForward Technologies	August 28, 2014	August 28, 2014	August 28, 2014		
Teenage Mutant Ninja Turtles: Mutants in Manhattan	PlatinumGames	May 24, 2016	May 24, 2016	May 24, 2016		
Teenage Mutant Ninja Turtles: Out of the Shadows	Red Fly Studio	Unreleased	April 16, 2014	April 15, 2014		
Teenage Mutant Ninja Turtles: Turtles in Time Re-Shelled	Ubisoft Singapore	Unreleased	October 1, 2009	September 10, 2009		
Tekken 5: Dark Resurrection	Namco	December 27, 2006	March 23, 2007	March 1, 2007		
Tekken 6	Namco Bandai	October 29, 2009	October 30, 2009	October 27, 2009		
Tekken Hybrid	Namco	December 1, 2011	November 25, 2011	November 22, 2011		
Tekken Revolution	Namco Bandai Games	June 12, 2013	June 12, 2013	June 11, 2013	F2P	
Tekken Tag Tournament 2	Namco	September 13, 2012	September 14, 2012	September 11, 2012	3D	
Tenchou no Igo	NCS	April 25, 2013	Unreleased	Unreleased		
Tennis in the Face	10tons	Unreleased	Unreleased	March 17, 2015		
Terminator Salvation	GRIN / Halcyon Games	September 17, 2009	May 29, 2009	May 19, 2009		
Terraria	Re-Logic	May 23, 2013	May 15, 2013	March 26, 2013		
TerRover	Creat Studios	Unreleased	September 29, 2010	September 7, 2010		
Teslagrad	Slightly Mad Studios	Unreleased	December 3, 2014	September 15, 2015		
Test Drive Ferrari Legends	Slightly Mad Studios	March 15, 2012	March 15, 2012	March 15, 2012		
Test Drive Unlimited 2	Eden Games	March 17, 2011	February 11, 2011	February 8, 2011	3D	
TestYourself: Psychology	Creat Studios	Unreleased	February 16, 2011	March 8, 2011		
Tetris HD	EA Mobile	July 6, 2011	December 22, 2010	January 4, 2011	3D	
Texas Cheat 'em	Wideload Games	August 13, 2009	May 14, 2009	May 14, 2009		
The Baconing	Hothead Games	Unreleased	August 31, 2011	August 30, 2011		
The Bigs	Blue Castle Games	Unreleased	Unreleased	June 25, 2007		
The Bigs 2	Blue Castle Games	Unreleased	July 17, 2009	July 7, 2009		
The Bluecoats: North vs South	Anuman	Unreleased	September 13, 2016	Unreleased		
The Bourne Conspiracy	High Moon Studios	Unreleased	June 27, 2008	June 3, 2008		
The Bridge	The Quantum Astrophysicists Guild	Unreleased	August 25, 2015	August 18, 2015		
The Bureau: XCOM Declassified	2k Marin	Unreleased	August 23, 2013	August 23, 2013		
The Cave	Double Fine Productions	August 28, 2013	January 23, 2013	January 22, 2013		
The Chronicles of Narnia: Prince Caspian	Traveller's Tales	Unreleased	June 20, 2008	May 15, 2008		
The Chronicles of Riddick: Assault on Dark Athena	Starbreeze Studios / Tigon Studios	Unreleased	April 24, 2009	April 7, 2009		
The Club	Bizarre Creations	Unreleased	February 8, 2008	February 20, 2008		
The Cursed Crusade	Kylotonn Entertainment	Unreleased	October 11, 2011	October 25, 2011		
The Darkness	Starbreeze Studios	June 26, 2008	July 22, 2007	June 25, 2007		
The Darkness II	Digital Extremes	Unreleased	February 10, 2012	February 7, 2012		
The Evil Within	Tango Gameworks	October 23, 2014	October 14, 2014	October 14, 2014		
The Expendables 2 Video Game	Ubisoft	Unreleased	August 22, 2012	July 31, 2012		
The Fancy Pants Adventures	Borne Games	July 6, 2011	April 20, 2011	April 19, 2011		
The Idolmaster 2	Namco	October 27, 2011	Unreleased	Unreleased		
The Idolmaster One For All	Bandai Namco Games	May 15, 2014	Unreleased	Unreleased		
The Idolm@ster Shiny TV	Bandai Namco Games	October 2, 2013	Unreleased	Unreleased		
The Idolm@ster: Gravure For You! Vol. 1	Bandai Namco Games	October 2, 2011	Unreleased	Unreleased		
The Idolm@ster: Gravure For You! Vol. 2	Bandai Namco Games	November 23, 2011	Unreleased	Unreleased		
The Idolm@ster: Gravure For You! Vol. 3	Bandai Namco Games	December 29, 2011	Unreleased	Unreleased		
The Idolm@ster: Gravure For You! Vol. 4	Bandai Namco Games	January 26, 2012	Unreleased	Unreleased		
The Idolm@ster: Gravure For You! Vol. 5	Bandai Namco Games	February 23, 2012	Unreleased	Unreleased		
The Idolm@ster: Gravure For You! Vol. 6	Bandai Namco Games	March 29, 2012	Unreleased	Unreleased		
The Idolm@ster: Gravure For You! Vol. 7	Bandai Namco Games	April 26, 2012	Unreleased	Unreleased		
The Idolm@ster: Gravure For You! Vol. 8	Bandai Namco Games	May 24, 2012	Unreleased	Unreleased		
The Idolm@ster: Gravure For You! Vol. 9	Bandai Namco Games	May 24, 2012	Unreleased	Unreleased		
The Jackbox Party Pack (Drawful, Fibbage XL, Lie Swatter, Word Spud, You Don't Know Jack 2015)	Jackbox Games	Unreleased	June 9, 2015	November 18, 2014		
The Jackbox Party Pack 2 (Bidiots, Bomb Corp., Earwax, Fibbage 2, Quiplash XL)	Jackbox Games	Unreleased	October 21, 2015	October 13, 2015		
The Last Bounty Hunter	Digital Leisure	Unreleased	July 31, 2013	July 30, 2013		
The Last Guy	Japan Studio	July 31, 2008	August 28, 2008	August 28, 2008		
The Legend of Korra	PlatinumGames	Unreleased	October 22, 2014	October 21, 2014		
The Mahjong: Tsuushin Taikyoku Kinoudzuke	D3 Publisher	July 31, 2009	Unreleased	Unreleased		
The Misshitsu Kara no Dasshutsu	D3 Publisher	July 6, 2011	Unreleased	Unreleased		
The Misshitsu Kara no Dasshutsu ~Tsukiyo no Manshon Hen~	D3 Publisher	December 22, 2011	Unreleased	Unreleased		
The Price Is Right	Virtuos	Unreleased	Unreleased	May 18, 2010		
The Price Is Right: Decades	Ludia	Unreleased	Unreleased	April 3, 2012		
The Punisher: No Mercy	Zen Studios	Unreleased	July 2, 2009	July 2, 2009		
The Raven: Legacy of a Master Thief	King Art Games	Unreleased	January 8, 2014	January 14, 2014		
The Revenge of Shinobi	Sega	May 23, 2012	May 23, 2012	May 22, 2012		
The Shoot	Cohort Studios	Unreleased	October 29, 2010	October 29, 2010	M E	
The Simpsons Arcade Game	Konami	Unreleased	February 8, 2012	February 7, 2012		
The Testament of Sherlock Holmes	Frogwares	Unreleased	September 20, 2012	September 25, 2012		
The Swapper	Facepalm Games	November 4, 2015	August 6, 2014	August 5, 2014		
The Swindle	Size Five Games	Unreleased	July 28, 2015	July 28, 2015		
The Treasures of Montezuma 4	Smartphone Labs	March 28, 2017	December 22, 2015	December 22, 2015		
The UnderGarden	Artech Studios	Unreleased	February 23, 2011	February 1, 2011		
The Walking Dead: Michonne	Telltale Games	Unreleased	February 23, 2016	February 23, 2016		
Thexder Neo	Square Enix	January 28, 2010	January 28, 2010	January 28, 2010		
Thief	Eidos Montréal	Unreleased	February 28, 2014	February 25, 2014		
Thomas Was Alone	Mike Bithell	Unreleased	April 24, 2013	April 23, 2013		
Thor: God of Thunder	Liquid Entertainment	Unreleased	April 30, 2011	May 3, 2011	3D	
Thunder Wolves	Most Wanted Entertainment	Unreleased	June 19, 2013	August 13, 2013		
Tiger Woods PGA Tour 07	EA Redwood Shores	Unreleased	March 23, 2007	November 17, 2006		
Tiger Woods PGA Tour 08	EA Tiburon	Unreleased	September 21, 2007	August 28, 2007	E	
Tiger Woods PGA Tour 09	EA Tiburon	Unreleased	August 29, 2008	August 26, 2008		
Tiger Woods PGA Tour 10	EA Tiburon	Unreleased	July 3, 2009	June 8, 2009	E	
Tiger Woods PGA Tour 11	EA Tiburon	Unreleased	July 2, 2010	June 8, 2010	M	
Tiger Woods PGA Tour 12: The Masters	EA Tiburon	Unreleased	April 1, 2011	March 29, 2011	M	
Tiger Woods PGA Tour 13: The Masters	EA Tiburon	Unreleased	April 1, 2012	March 27, 2012	M	
Tiger Woods PGA Tour 14: The Masters Historic Edition	EA Tiburon	Unreleased	April 1, 2013	March 26, 2013		
Time and Eternity	Image Epoch	October 11, 2012	October 11, 2012	October 11, 2012		
Time Crisis 4	Nex Entertainment	December 20, 2007	April 18, 2008	November 19, 2007		
Time Crisis: Razing Storm	Nex Entertainment	October 21, 2010	November 5, 2010	October 19, 2010	M E	
Time Leap	Front Wing	December 27, 2007	Unreleased	Unreleased		
Time Machine: Rogue Pilot	Lesta Studio	Unreleased	December 22, 2010	March 13, 2012		
TimeShift	Saber Interactive	Unreleased	December 14, 2007	November 19, 2007		
Tiny Brains	Spearhead Games	Unreleased	December 18, 2013	January 7, 2014		
Tiny Token Empires	BiP Media	Unreleased	April 3, 2013	May 14, 2013		
Tiny Troopers: Joint Ops	Wired Productions	July 10, 2015	October 29, 2014	October 28, 2014		
Titan Attacks!	Puppy Games	Unreleased	May 7, 2014	May 6, 2014		
TNA Impact!	Midway Studios – Los Angeles	Unreleased	September 12, 2008	September 9, 2008		
TNT Racers	Keen Games	Unreleased	December 1, 2010	January 3, 2012		
To Heart 2 DX Plus	Silicon Studio	September 22, 2011	Unreleased	Unreleased		
ToeJam & Earl	Johnson Voorsanger Productions	Unreleased	November 7, 2012	November 6, 2012		
ToeJam & Earl in Panic on Funkotron	Johnson Voorsanger Productions	Unreleased	November 7, 2012	November 6, 2012		
Toki Tori	Two Tribes	Unreleased	November 16, 2011	December 17, 2013		
Tokyo Jungle	Japan Studio / Crispy's	June 7, 2012	September 25, 2012	September 26, 2012		
Tokyo Twilight Ghost Hunters	Arc System Works, Aksys Games, NIS America	April 10, 2014	March 13, 2015	March 10, 2015		
Tokyo Twilight Ghost Hunters: Daybreak Special Gigs (Note: update for Tokyo Twilight Ghost Hunters.)	Arc System Works	November 26, 2015	Unreleased	Unreleased		
Tom Clancy's EndWar	Ubisoft Shanghai	February 26, 2009	November 7, 2008	November 4, 2008		
Tom Clancy's Ghost Recon Advanced Warfighter 2	Red Storm Entertainment	November 8, 2007	August 24, 2007	August 31, 2007		
Tom Clancy's Ghost Recon: Future Soldier	Ubisoft Paris	Unreleased	May 24, 2012	May 22, 2012		
Tom Clancy's H.A.W.X	Ubisoft Bucharest	May 28, 2009	March 9, 2009	March 6, 2009		
Tom Clancy's H.A.W.X 2	Ubisoft Bucharest	October 7, 2010	September 10, 2010	September 7, 2010		
Tom Clancy's Rainbow Six: Vegas	Ubisoft Montreal	June 28, 2008	June 29, 2007	June 26, 2007		
Tom Clancy's Rainbow Six: Vegas 2	Ubisoft Montreal	May 29, 2008	March 20, 2008	March 18, 2008	E	
Tom Clancy's Splinter Cell HD	Ubisoft	Unreleased	August 10, 2011	December 27, 2011	3D	
Tom Clancy's Splinter Cell: Blacklist	Ubisoft	September 5, 2013	August 23, 2013	August 20, 2013		
Tom Clancy's Splinter Cell: Double Agent	Ubisoft Shanghai	Unreleased	March 30, 2007	March 27, 2007		
Tom Clancy's Splinter Cell: Pandora Tomorrow HD	Ubisoft	Unreleased	August 10, 2011	December 27, 2011	3D	
Tom Clancy's Splinter Cell: Chaos Theory HD	Ubisoft	Unreleased	August 10, 2011	December 27, 2011	3D	
Tomb Raider	Crystal Dynamics	April 25, 2013	March 5, 2013	March 5, 2013		
The Tomb Raider Trilogy	Crystal Dynamics	Unreleased	March 25, 2011	March 22, 2011		
Tomb Raider: Underworld	Crystal Dynamics	January 29, 2009	November 21, 2008	November 18, 2008		
Tomoyo After: It's a Wonderful Life	Prototype	July 29, 2012	Unreleased	Unreleased		
Tony Hawk's Project 8	Neversoft	Unreleased	March 23, 2007	November 17, 2006		
Tony Hawk's Pro Skater 5	Robomodo	December 15, 2015	December 15, 2015	December 15, 2015		
Tony Hawk's Pro Skater HD	Robomodo	Unreleased	August 29, 2012	August 28, 2012		
Tony Hawk's Proving Ground	Neversoft	Unreleased	October 31, 2007	October 15, 2007		
Tony Hawk: Ride	Robomodo	Unreleased	December 4, 2009	November 17, 2009		
Tony Hawk: Shred	Robomodo	Unreleased	October 29, 2010	October 26, 2010		
Top Darts	Devil's Details	Unreleased	December 22, 2010	December 21, 2010	3D	
Top Gun: Wingman Edition	Doublesix	Unreleased	September 8, 2010	August 17, 2010		
Top Gun: Hard Lock	Headstrong Games	Unreleased	April 5, 2012	March 6, 2012		
Top Spin 3	PAM Development	June 25, 2009	June 20, 2008	June 23, 2008		
Top Spin 4	2K Czech	April 7, 2011	March 18, 2011	March 15, 2011	3D M	
Top Trumps Turbo	Funbox Media	Unreleased	June 30, 2017	Unreleased		
Topatoi	Boolat Games	Unreleased	July 2, 2009	October 15, 2009		
Tori-Emaki	London Studio, Playlogic Entertainment	Unreleased	November 1, 2007	January 17, 2008	E	
Tornado Outbreak	Loose Cannon Studios	Unreleased	November 12, 2009	September 29, 2009		
Torne (app)	SCEI	March 18, 2010	Unreleased	Unreleased		
Toro to Morimori	SCEI	July 23, 2009	Unreleased	Unreleased		
Touch, Shiyo! Love Application	Compile	February 23, 2012	Unreleased	Unreleased		
Toukiden 2	Koei Tecmo Games	July 28, 2016	Unreleased	Unreleased		
Tower of Guns	Terrible Posture Games	May 7, 2015	April 8, 2015	April 7, 2015		
Toy Home	Game Republic	November 1, 2007	December 20, 2007	December 20, 2007		
Toy Story 3	Avalanche Software	Unreleased	June 16, 2010	June 15, 2010	M	
Toy Story Mania	High Voltage Software	Unreleased	October 30, 2012	October 30, 2012		
Toybox Turbos	Codemasters	December 4, 2014	November 12, 2014	November 11, 2014		
Transformers: Dark of the Moon	High Moon Studios	Unreleased	June 24, 2011	June 14, 2011		
Transformers: Devastation	PlatinumGames	August 6, 2015	August 6, 2015	August 6, 2015		
Transformers: Fall of Cybertron	High Moon Studios	August 21, 2012	August 21, 2012	August 21, 2012		
Transformers: The Game	Traveller's Tales	Unreleased	July 20, 2007	June 26, 2007		
Transformers: Revenge of the Fallen	Luxoflux	Unreleased	June 26, 2009	June 23, 2009		
Transformers: Rise of the Dark Spark	Edge of Reality	June 24, 2014	June 24, 2014	June 24, 2014		
Transformers: War for Cybertron	High Moon Studios	Unreleased	June 25, 2010	June 22, 2010		
Trash Panic	Japan Studio	March 19, 2009	June 4, 2009	June 4, 2009		
Treasures of Montezuma: Arena	Alawar	Unreleased	December 17, 2014	February 17, 2015		
The Trials of Topoq	London Studio	Unreleased	October 25, 2007	December 20, 2007	E	
Trine	Frozenbyte	March 31, 2010	September 17, 2009	October 22, 2009		
Trine 2	Frozenbyte	Unreleased	March 7, 2012	December 20, 2011		
Trinity Universe	Nippon Ichi Software / Gust Corporation	October 1, 2009	June 25, 2010	June 29, 2010		
Trinity: Souls of Zill O'll	Koei	November 25, 2010	February 11, 2011	February 8, 2011		
Trivial Pursuit	EA Bright Light	Unreleased	March 13, 2009	March 10, 2009		
Trivial Pursuit Live!	Longtail Studios	Unreleased	February 18, 2015	February 17, 2015		
Tron: Evolution	Propaganda Games	Unreleased	December 10, 2010	December 7, 2010	3D M	
Truck Racer	Kylotonn	Unreleased	February 4, 2014	February 4, 2014		
Truth or Lies	Big Ant Studios	Unreleased	November 19, 2011	September 14, 2010		
Tumble	Supermassive Games	Unreleased	September 15, 2010	September 14, 2010	3D M	
Turbo: Super Stunt Squad	WayForward Technologies	Unreleased	September 20, 2013	July 16, 2013		
Turning Point: Fall of Liberty	Spark Unlimited	Unreleased	February 29, 2008	February 26, 2008		
Turok	Propaganda Games	May 29, 2008	February 8, 2008	February 5, 2008		
TV Show King	Gameloft	August 21, 2009	August 6, 2009	August 6, 2009		
TV Superstars	SCE Studio Cambridge	December 9, 2010	October 29, 2010	October 29, 2010	M E	
TV Anime Idolm@ster: Cinderella Girls G4U! Pack vol.1	Bandai Namco	April 23, 2015	Unreleased	Unreleased		
TV Anime IdolM@ster: Cinderella Girls G4U! Pack Vol. 2	Bandai Namco Games	June 25, 2015	Unreleased	Unreleased		
TV Anime IdolM@ster: Cinderella Girls G4U! Pack Vol. 3	Bandai Namco Games	July 23, 2015	Unreleased	Unreleased		
TV Anime IdolM@ster: Cinderella Girls G4U! Pack Vol. 4	Bandai Namco Games	August 27, 2015	Unreleased	Unreleased		
TV Anime IdolM@ster: Cinderella Girls G4U! Pack Vol. 5	Bandai Namco Games	September 27, 2015	Unreleased	Unreleased		
TV Anime IdolM@ster: Cinderella Girls G4U! Pack Vol. 6	Bandai Namco Games	November 26, 2015	Unreleased	Unreleased		
TV Anime IdolM@ster: Cinderella Girls G4U! Pack Vol. 7	Bandai Namco Games	November 23, 2015	Unreleased	Unreleased		
TV Anime IdolM@ster: Cinderella Girls G4U! Pack Vol. 8	Bandai Namco Games	January 28, 2016	Unreleased	Unreleased		
TV Anime IdolM@ster: Cinderella Girls G4U! Pack Vol. 9	Bandai Namco Games	February 25, 2016	Unreleased	Unreleased		
Twisted Lands: Shadow Town	Alawar	Unreleased	June 5, 2013	January 7, 2014		
Twisted Metal	Eat Sleep Play	Unreleased	March 16, 2012	February 14, 2012		
Two Worlds II	Reality Pump Studios	February 17, 2011	March 11, 2011	January 25, 2011		
uDraw GameTablet with uDraw Studio (app)	THQ	Unreleased	November 15, 2011	November 15, 2011		
uDraw Studio: Instant Artist (app)	THQ	Unreleased	November 15, 2011	November 15, 2011		
UEFA Euro 2008	EA Canada	Unreleased	April 18, 2008	April 19, 2008		
UEFA EURO 2016: Winning Eleven 2016 (Note: update for PES 2016: Pro Evolution Soccer.)	Konami	April 21, 2016	April 21, 2016	April 21, 2016		
UFC 2009 Undisputed	Yuke's	Unreleased	May 22, 2009	May 19, 2009		
UFC Undisputed 2010	Yuke's	Unreleased	May 28, 2010	May 25, 2010		
UFC Personal Trainer: The Ultimate Fitness System	Heavy Iron Studios	Unreleased	July 1, 2011	July 1, 2011	M	
UFC Undisputed 3	Yuke's	Unreleased	February 17, 2012	February 14, 2012		
Ugly Americans: Apocalypsegeddon	Backbone Entertainment	Unreleased	Unreleased	August 30, 2011		
Ukiyo no Shishi	Spike Chunsoft	January 29, 2015	Unreleased	Unreleased		
The Ultimate Battle of the Sexes: Quiz & Play	dtp Entertainment	Unreleased	March 23, 2012	Unreleased		
Ultimate Marvel vs. Capcom 3 (Note: update for Marvel vs. Capcom 3: Fate of Two Worlds.)	Capcom	November 17, 2011	November 18, 2011	November 15, 2011		
Ultra Street Fighter IV (Note: update for Super Street Fighter IV: Arcade Edition.)	Capcom / Dimps	August 7, 2014	August 5, 2014	August 5, 2014		
Ultratron	Puppy Games	Unreleased	May 13, 2015	May 12, 2015		
Umineko no Naku Koro ni: Majo to Suiri no Rinbukyoku	Alchemist	December 16, 2010	Unreleased	Unreleased		
Umineko no Naku Koro ni San: Shinjitsu to Gensou no Yasoukyoku	Alchemist	December 15, 2011	Unreleased	Unreleased		
Uncharted: Drake's Fortune	Naughty Dog	December 6, 2007	December 7, 2007	November 19, 2007		
Uncharted 2: Among Thieves	Naughty Dog	October 15, 2009	October 16, 2009	October 13, 2009		
Uncharted 3: Drake's Deception	Naughty Dog	October 28, 2011	November 4, 2011	November 1, 2011	3D	
Under Defeat HD: Deluxe Edition	Rising Star Games	November 28, 2012	November 28, 2012	November 28, 2012		
Under Night In-Birth Exe:Late	Ecole Software, French Bread	July 24, 2014	February 27, 2015	February 24, 2015		
Under Night In-Birth Exe:Late[st] (Note: update for Under Night In-Birth Exe:Late.)	French Bread	July 20, 2017	February 16, 2018	February 9, 2018		
Under Siege	Seed Studios	August 23, 2011	June 2, 2011	June 2, 2011	M	
Unearthed: Trail of Ibn Battuta	Semaphore	Unreleased	May 29, 2013	Unreleased		
Unfinished Swan	Giant Sparrow	December 13, 2012	October 24, 2012	October 23, 2012	M	
Unmechanical: Extended Edition	Talawa Games	October 21, 2015	February 11, 2015	February 10, 2015		
Uno	Gameloft	September 24, 2009	October 15, 2009	October 1, 2009		
Unreal Tournament 3	Epic Games	Unreleased	February 22, 2008	December 11, 2007		
Untold Legends: Dark Kingdom	Sony Online Entertainment	February 22, 2007	May 4, 2007	November 17, 2006		
Up	Heavy Iron Studios	Unreleased	October 2, 2009	May 26, 2009		
Urban Trial Freestyle	Tate Multimedia	August 29, 2013	February 20, 2013	February 19, 2013		
Utawarerumono: Futari no Hakuoro	Aqua Plus	September 21, 2016	Unreleased	Unreleased		
Utawarerumono: Itsuwari no Kamen	Aqua Plus	September 24, 2015	Unreleased	Unreleased		
Valiant Hearts: The Great War	Ubisoft Montpellier	July 31, 2014	June 25, 2014	June 24, 2014		
Valkyria Chronicles	Sega WOW	April 24, 2008	October 31, 2008	November 4, 2008		
Vampire Rain: Altered Species	Artoon	August 21, 2008	Unreleased	September 2, 2008		
Vancouver 2010	Eurocom	Unreleased	January 15, 2010	January 12, 2010		
Vandal Hearts: Flames of Judgment	Hijinx Studios	January 28, 2010	March 4, 2010	January 21, 2010		
Vanquish	PlatinumGames	October 21, 2010	October 22, 2010	October 19, 2010		
Velocibox	Shawn Beck	Unreleased	Unreleased	July 28, 2015		
Velocity Ultra	FuturLab	Unreleased	November 13, 2013	November 12, 2013		
Venetica	Deck13 Interactive	Unreleased	November 5, 2010	January 18, 2011		
Vessel	Strange Loop Games	Unreleased	March 12, 2014	March 11, 2014		
Viking: Battle for Asgard	The Creative Assembly	Unreleased	March 28, 2008	March 25, 2008		
Virtua Fighter 2	Sega	November 28, 2012	December 5, 2012	November 27, 2012		
Virtua Fighter 5	Sega-AM2	February 8, 2007	March 23, 2007	February 20, 2007		
Virtua Fighter 5 Final Showdown (Note: update for Virtua Fighter 5.)	Sega	June 6, 2012	June 6, 2012	June 5, 2012		
Virtua Striker	Sega	February 13, 2013	Unreleased	Unreleased		
Virtua Tennis 3	Sega-AM3	March 8, 2007	March 23, 2007	March 20, 2007		
Virtua Tennis 4	Sega-AM3	June 30, 2011	April 29, 2011	May 10, 2011	3D M	
Virtua Tennis 2009	Sumo Digital	Unreleased	May 28, 2009	June 9, 2009		
Virtual On: Cyber Troopers	Sega	February 13, 2013	Unreleased	Unreleased		
Visualizer (app)	Q-Games	Unreleased	Unreleased	August 28, 2013		
Vividred Operation: Hyper Intimate Power	Bandai Namco Entertainment	June 20, 2013	Unreleased	Unreleased		
Vividred Operation: Mayonnaise Operation With Akane!	Bandai Namco Entertainment	March 28, 2013	Unreleased	Unreleased		
The Voice of Germany Vol. 2	bitComposer	Unreleased	October 31, 2013	December 13, 2007		
The Voice: I Want You	bitComposer	Unreleased	October 21, 2014	December 13, 2007		
Voltron: Defender of the Universe	Behaviour Interactive	Unreleased	November 30, 2011	November 29, 2011		
Voodoo Chronicles: The First Sign	Space Monkey Games Factory International	Unreleased	April 3, 2013	July 16, 2013		
Voodoo Dice	Exkee	November 24, 2010	May 26, 2010	June 8, 2010		
Wakeboarding HD	Creat Studios	Unreleased	March 18, 2010	March 25, 2010		
WALL-E	Heavy Iron Studios	Unreleased	July 4, 2008	June 24, 2008		
The Walking Dead	Telltale Games	Unreleased	November 11, 2012	November 11, 2012		
The Walking Dead: Season Two	Telltale Games	Unreleased	August 24, 2014	August 24, 2014		
The Walking Dead: Survival Instinct	Activision	Unreleased	March 19, 2013	March 19, 2013		
Wangan Midnight	Genki	July 26, 2007	Unreleased	Unreleased		
Wanted: Weapons of Fate	GRIN	June 25, 2009	April 3, 2009	March 24, 2009		
Wanted Corp	Eko Systems	Unreleased	December 7, 2011	December 6, 2011	M	
Warhammer 40,000: Kill Team	THQ Digital Studios UK	Unreleased	August 17, 2011	August 2, 2011		
Warhammer 40,000: Space Marine	Relic Entertainment	Unreleased	September 9, 2011	September 6, 2011		
Warhawk	Incognito Entertainment / Santa Monica Studio	Unreleased	September 21, 2007	August 28, 2007		
Warlords	Griptonite Games / Atari	Unreleased	October 10, 2012	October 9, 2012		
Warp	trapdoor	Unreleased	March 14, 2012	March 13, 2012		
Warriors: Legends of Troy	Koei Canada	May 26, 2011	March 18, 2011	March 8, 2011		
Warriors Orochi 3	Omega Force	December 22, 2011	April 6, 2012	March 20, 2012		
Warriors Orochi 3 Ultimate (Note: update for Warriors Orochi 3.)	Omega Force	September 26, 2013	October 1, 2014	September 30, 2014		
Watch Dogs	Ubisoft Montreal	May 27, 2014	May 27, 2014	May 27, 2014		
Watchmen: The End Is Nigh	Deadline Games	Unreleased	July 24, 2009	July 21, 2009		
Watchmen: The End Is Nigh Part 2	Deadline Games	Unreleased	July 30, 2009	July 30, 2009		
Way of the Dogg	Echo Peak	Unreleased	Unreleased	May 3, 2013		
Way of the Samurai 3	Acquire	November 13, 2008	March 12, 2010	October 13, 2009		
Way of the Samurai 4	Acquire	March 3, 2011	October 8, 2012	Unreleased		
We Dare	Ubisoft	Unreleased	March 3, 2011	Unreleased	M	
Weird Park: The Final Show	Alawar	Unreleased	May 20, 2015	May 26, 2015		
WET	Artificial Mind and Movement	Unreleased	September 18, 2009	September 15, 2009		
Wheel of Fortune (2009)	Sony Online Entertainment	Unreleased	Unreleased	March 19, 2009		
Wheel of Fortune (2012)	Sony Online Entertainment	Unreleased	Unreleased	October 16, 2012		
Wheels of Destruction: World Tour	Gelid Games, Inc.	Unreleased	March 28, 2012	April 3, 2012		
Wheelman	Midway Studios – Newcastle / Tigon Studios	Unreleased	March 27, 2009	March 24, 2009		
When Vikings Attack!	Clever Beans	February 7, 2013	November 7, 2012	November 6, 2012		
Where the Wild Things Are	Griptonite Games	Unreleased	November 25, 2009	October 13, 2009		
White Album	Aquaplus	June 24, 2010	Unreleased	Unreleased		
White Album 2: Shiawase no Mukougawa	Aquaplus	December 20, 2012	Unreleased	Unreleased		
White Knight Chronicles	Level-5 / Japan Studio	December 25, 2008	February 26, 2010	February 2, 2010		
White Knight Chronicles II	Level-5 / Japan Studio	July 8, 2010	June 10, 2011	September 13, 2011		
Whitetail Challenge	PSR Outdoors	Unreleased	Unreleased	March 9, 2016		
Who Wants to Be a Millionaire?	Ludia	Unreleased	Unreleased	November 22, 2011		
Who Wants to Be a Millionaire? Special Editions	Doublesix	Unreleased	November 23, 2011	October 15, 2013		
Wicked Monster Blast! HD	Corecell Technology	Unreleased	September 5, 2012	November 13, 2012		
Winter Sports 2010: The Great Tournament	RTL Entertainment	Unreleased	January 15, 2010	January 15, 2010		
Winter Sports 3: The Great Tournament	Corecell Technology	February 10, 2010	November 27, 2009	Unreleased		
Winter Stars	49Games	Unreleased	November 15, 2011	November 15, 2011	M	
Winning Post 7 Maximum 2007	Koei	March 29, 2007	Unreleased	Unreleased		
Winning Post 7 Maximum 2008 (Note: update for Winning Post 7 Maximum 2007.)	Koei	March 13, 2008	Unreleased	Unreleased		
Winning Post 7 Maximum 2010 (Note: update for Winning Post 7 Maximum 2007.)	Koei	October 27, 2010	Unreleased	Unreleased		
Winning Post 7 Maximum 2012 (Note: update for Winning Post 7 Maximum 2007.)	Koei	March 15, 2012	Unreleased	Unreleased		
Winning Post 7 Maximum 2013 (Note: update for Winning Post 7 Maximum 2007.)	Koei	March 14, 2013	Unreleased	Unreleased		
Winning Post 8	Koei	March 27, 2014	Unreleased	Unreleased		
Winning Post 8 2015 (Note: update for Winning Post 8.)	Koei	March 12, 2015	Unreleased	Unreleased		
Winning Post 8 2016 (Note: update for Winning Post 8.)	Koei	March 31, 2016	Unreleased	Unreleased		
Winning Post 8 2017 (Note: update for Winning Post 8.)	Koei	March 2, 2017	Unreleased	Unreleased		
Winning Post World	Koei	April 2, 2009	Unreleased	Unreleased		
Winning Post World 2010 (Note: update for Winning Post World.)	Koei	February 26, 2010	Unreleased	Unreleased		
Wipeout 2	Behaviour Santiago	Unreleased	Unreleased	October 11, 2011	M	
Wipeout HD	Studio Liverpool	October 29, 2008	October 16, 2009	September 22, 2008	3D	
Wipeout HD Fury (Note: DLC for Wipeout HD.)	Studio Liverpool	Unreleased	July 23, 2009	July 23, 2009		
The Witch and the Hundred Knight	Nippon Ichi Software	July 25, 2013	March 21, 2014	March 25, 2014		
Wizardry: Labyrinth of Lost Souls	Acquire	December 9, 2009	December 7, 2011	June 2, 2011		
Wizardry: Torawareshi Bourei no Machi	Acquire	January 27, 2011	Unreleased	Unreleased		
The Wolf Among Us	Telltale Games	Unreleased	August 21, 2009	August 11, 2013		
Wolf of the Battlefield: Commando 3	Backbone Entertainment	Unreleased	July 3, 2008	June 5, 2008		
Wolfenstein	Raven Software / id Software	Unreleased	August 21, 2009	August 18, 2009		
Wolfenstein 3D	Id Software	Unreleased	June 11, 2009	June 4, 2009		
Wolfenstein: The New Order	MachineGames	June 5, 2014	May 20, 2014	May 20, 2014		
Wonder Boy in Monster Land	Sega	May 23, 2012	May 23, 2012	May 22, 2012		
Wonder Boy in Monster World	Sega	May 23, 2012	May 23, 2012	May 22, 2012		
Wonderbook: Book of Spells	London Studio / Supermassive Games	Unreleased	November 13, 2012	November 13, 2012	M	
Wonderbook: Book of Potions	London Studio / Supermassive Games	Unreleased	November 15, 2013	November 12, 2013	M	
Wonderbook: Diggs Nightcrawler	London Studio / Supermassive Games	Unreleased	December 31, 2013	December 31, 2013	M	
Wonderbook: Walking With Dinosaurs	London Studio / Supermassive Games	Unreleased	December 12, 2013	December 12, 2013	M	
World Gone Sour	Playbrains	Unreleased	Unreleased	April 10, 2012		
World Hunter	PSR Outdoors	Unreleased	April 15, 2015	February 3, 2015		
World of Outlaws: Sprint Cars	Big Ant Studios	Unreleased	June 17, 2010	Unreleased		
World Series of Poker 2008: Battle for the Bracelets	Left Field Productions	Unreleased	December 7, 2007	September 25, 2007		
World Snooker Championship 2007	Blade Interactive	Unreleased	March 23, 2007	Unreleased		
World Soccer Winning Eleven 2010: Aoki Samurai no Chousen (Note: update for PES 2010: Pro Evolution Soccer.)	Konami	May 20, 2010	Unreleased	Unreleased		
World Soccer Winning Eleven 2014: Aoki Samurai no Chousen (Note: update for PES 2014: Pro Evolution Soccer.)	Konami	May 22, 2014	Unreleased	Unreleased		
Worms	Team17	Unreleased	February 20, 2009	March 26, 2009		
Worms 2: Armageddon	Team17	Unreleased	September 8, 2010	September 14, 2010		
Worms Crazy Golf	Team17	Unreleased	October 19, 2011	October 25, 2011		
Worms Revolution	Team17	Unreleased	October 10, 2012	October 9, 2012		
Worms Ultimate Mayhem	Team17	Unreleased	February 15, 2012	February 14, 2012		
WRC: FIA World Rally Championship	Milestone srl	Unreleased	October 8, 2010	Unreleased		
WRC 2: FIA World Rally Championship	Milestone srl	February 16, 2012	October 14, 2011	Unreleased		
WRC 3: FIA World Rally Championship	Milestone srl	Unreleased	October 12, 2012	March 26, 2013		
WRC 4: FIA World Rally Championship	Milestone srl	July 24, 2014	October 25, 2013	July 29, 2014		
WRC 5	Kylotonn	Unreleased	October 13, 2015	October 13, 2015		
WRC Powerslide	Milestone srl	Unreleased	March 13, 2013	March 8, 2013		
Wrecked: Revenge Revisited	Supersonic Software	Unreleased	March 28, 2012	Unreleased		
WSC Real 08: World Snooker Championship	Blade Interactive	Unreleased	July 10, 2008	Unreleased		
WSC Real 09: World Snooker Championship	Blade Interactive	Unreleased	April 3, 2009	Unreleased		
WSC Real 11: World Snooker Championship	Dark Energy Digital	Unreleased	April 15, 2011	Unreleased		
WWE '12	Yuke's	January 26, 2012	November 25, 2011	November 22, 2011		
WWE '13	Yuke's	Unreleased	November 2, 2012	October 30, 2012		
WWE 2K14	Visual Concepts/Yuke's	October 30, 2013	November 1, 2013	October 29, 2013		
WWE 2K15	Visual Concepts/Yuke's	Unreleased	October 31, 2014	October 28, 2014		
WWE 2K16	Visual Concepts/Yuke's	Unreleased	October 30, 2015	October 27, 2015		
WWE 2K17	Visual Concepts/Yuke's	Unreleased	October 11, 2016	October 11, 2016		
WWE All Stars	THQ San Diego	Unreleased	April 1, 2011	March 29, 2011		
WWE Legends of WrestleMania	Yuke's	July 9, 2009	March 19, 2009	March 24, 2009		
WWE SmackDown vs. Raw 2008	Yuke's	February 14, 2008	November 15, 2007	November 13, 2007		
WWE SmackDown vs. Raw 2009	Yuke's	January 22, 2009	November 7, 2008	November 9, 2008		
WWE SmackDown vs. Raw 2010	Yuke's	Unreleased	October 23, 2009	October 20, 2009		
WWE SmackDown vs. Raw 2011	Yuke's	Unreleased	October 29, 2010	October 26, 2010		
X-Blades	Gaijin Entertainment	April 30, 2009	February 20, 2009	February 10, 2009		
X-Factor	Koch Media	Unreleased	August 29, 2010	August 29, 2010		
X-Men	Konami	Unreleased	February 2, 2011	December 14, 2010		
X-Men Origins: Wolverine	Raven Software	Unreleased	May 1, 2009	May 1, 2009		
X-Men: Destiny	Silicon Knights	Unreleased	September 13, 2011	September 13, 2011		
XBLAZE Code: Embryo	Arc System Works	July 25, 2013	September 18, 2015	June 24, 2014		
Xblaze Lost: Memories	Arc System Works	April 9, 2015	August 11, 2015	June 21, 2016		
XCOM: Enemy Unknown	Firaxis Games	October 12, 2012	October 12, 2012	October 9, 2012		
XCOM: Enemy Within (Note: stand-alone expansion for XCOM: Enemy Unknown.)	Firaxis Games	Unreleased	November 15, 2013	November 15, 2013		
Yaiba: Ninja Gaiden Z	Team Ninja	March 27, 2014	March 21, 2014	March 18, 2014		
Yakuza 3	Team CS1	February 26, 2009	March 12, 2010	March 9, 2010		
Yakuza 4	CS1 Team	March 18, 2010	March 18, 2011	March 15, 2011		
Yakuza 5	Sega	December 5, 2012	December 8, 2015	December 8, 2015		
Yakuza: Dead Souls	Sega	June 9, 2011	March 16, 2012	March 13, 2012		
Yamasa Digiworld SP Pachislo Sengoku Musou	Yamasa Entertainment	December 31, 2006	Unreleased	Unreleased		
Yamasa Digiworld SP Pachislo Bounty Killer	Yamasa Entertainment	October 30, 2008	Unreleased	Unreleased		
Yoostar 2: In the Movies	Yoostar Entertainment	Unreleased	March 8, 2011	March 8, 2011	M	
Yorunonaikuni	Gust	August 1, 2015	Unreleased	Unreleased		
You Don't Know Jack	Jellyvision Games, Iron Galaxy	Unreleased	Unreleased	February 8, 2011		
Young Justice: Legacy	Freedom Factory	November 19, 2013	November 19, 2013	November 19, 2013		
Yu-Gi-Oh! 5D's: Decade Duels Plus	Other Ocean Interactive	Unreleased	Unreleased	February 12, 2013		
Yu-Gi-Oh! Millennium Duels	Other Ocean Interactive	Unreleased	April 23, 2014	April 29, 2014		
Zack Zero	Crocodile Entertainment	Unreleased	January 11, 2012	January 17, 2012		
Zen Pinball	Zen Studios	Unreleased	May 14, 2009	May 14, 2009		
Zen Pinball 2 (Note: update for Zen Pinball.)	Zen Studios	Unreleased	September 5, 2012	September 4, 2012	3D	
Zeno Clash II	ACE Team	Unreleased	July 31, 2013	July 23, 2013		
Zombeer	Moonbite Games	Unreleased	January 22, 2014	February 11, 2014		
Zombie Apocalypse	Nihilistic	Unreleased	October 29, 2009	September 24, 2009		
Zombie Apocalypse: Never Die Alone	Backbone Entertainment	Unreleased	Unreleased	October 25, 2011		
Zombie Driver HD	Exor Studios	February 19, 2013	January 23, 2013	December 18, 2012		
Zombie Tycoon II: Brainhov's Revenge	Frima Studio	February 6, 2014	May 1, 2013	April 30, 2013		
Zone of the Enders: HD Collection	Kojima Productions	October 25, 2012	November 30, 2012	October 30, 2012		
Zone of the Enders: The 2nd Runner HD Edition	High Voltage Software	July 25, 2013	August 7, 2013	March 27, 2013		
Zuma	PopCap Games	Unreleased	June 25, 2009	February 19, 2009		
Zuma's Revenge!	PopCap Games	Unreleased	September 19, 2012	September 18, 2012		
Zumba Fitness – Join the Party	505 Games	Unreleased	November 26, 2010	November 18, 2010	M	
Z/X – Crusade of the Absolute Boundary	Nippon Ichi Software	March 23, 2013	Unreleased	Unreleased		
