= Zombie apocalypse (disambiguation) =

A zombie apocalypse is a genre in fiction.

Zombie Apocalypse may also refer to:

- Zombie Apocalypse (band), a metalcore band
- Zombie Apocalypse, an EP by the death metal band Mortician
- Zombie Apocalypse (video game), a console game by Nihilistic Software
- Zombie Apocalypse (film), a 2011 film by the Asylum
