= Tornado Outbreak =

2009 video game

- Developer: Loose Cannon Studios
- Publisher: Konami Digital Entertainment
- Director: Dev Madan
- Producer: Darci Morales
- Designers: Rob McDaniel; Scott Kikuta
- Programmers: Scott Bilas; Matthew Scott; Shane Whitfield
- Artists: Dev Madan; Karin Madan; Jordan Kotzebue; Travis Kotzebue
- Writer: Aaron Martin
- Composer: Peter McConnell
- Platforms: PlayStation 3, Wii, Xbox 360
- Release: NA: September 29, 2009; EU: November 13, 2009
- Genre: Action-adventure
- Modes: Single-player, multiplayer

Tornado Outbreak (Note: Formerly known as Zephyr: Rise of the Elementals) is an action-adventure video game developed by Loose Cannon Studios and published by Konami Digital Entertainment for the PlayStation 3, Wii and Xbox 360. The game was announced at the Electronic Entertainment Expo in June 2009. The game was later re-released on the Xbox Live Marketplace on December 6, 2011.

== Plot ==
Zephyr, a blue spiraling air elemental, is chosen to take over the reins of the squadron of Wind Warriors after the former captain-in-command, Nimbus steps down. The Wind Warriors, an elite race of air elementals, are tasked with the mission of generating atmosphere on lifeless planets. However, their plans change when Zephyr and his team encounter a dying elemental named Omegaton. Omegaton pleads for Zephyr to retrieve his six orbs of power, which were taken by his alleged enemies, the Fire Flyers. Their mission leads them to Earth, using a machine called Lightweight Object Amalgam Device (L.O.A.D. STARR) given to them by Omegaton. The device is meant to protect Zephyr and his team from the deadly UV rays of sunlight as they collect the Fire Flyers.

As Zephyr continues his search for Fire Flyers, he begins to question his own morals. He consults and expresses his doubt about his mission to Nimbus, who reminds him to lead his team without doubt. On the second extraction of Omegaton's orb, Zephyr, Nimbus, and the Wind Warriors are ambushed and attacked by the Fire Flyers, leaving Nimbus incapacitated. He passes the L.O.A.D. STARR onto his protégé and urges him to continue the mission without him. As the Fire Flyers surround Nimbus, they capture and relocate him into an underground tunnel to prevent him from the sun's exposure. He removes a piece of his clothing and instructs the Fire Flyers to place them in various locations to give Zephyr a sign of life.

Zephyr first discovers Nimbus's shoulder pads left on the ground. He then finds Nimbus's cape pinned beneath a rock at an amusement park, where he meets a new ally who calls himself a Stone Stomper. The Stone Stomper teaches Zephyr how to perform powerful stomps with the hope that Zephyr can rescue his sleeping brothers who are trapped on Earth. The fourth extraction of the orb results in a powerful earthquake, trapping several Wind Warriors below ground. The Wind Warriors, suffering from the lack of rest and sleep deprivation, experience partial exhaustion, prompting Zephyr to offer them paid vacations and holidays off. This encouragement initially seems to work, but one soldier, suffering from exhaustion during flight, bumps directly into Zephyr as he drops the L.O.A.D. STARR, leading to a life-or-death situation. Focused on carrying on the mission, Zephyr and his team swiftly recover the fifth orb, and then he orders the squad to rest in an underground village. Working alone, Zephyr repairs the L.O.A.D. STARR.

As they set out to retrieve the sixth orb, Zephyr encounters an elemental ally named the Water Whirl, who teaches him how to dash around using his tornado. Similar to the Stone Stompers, the Water Whirl's relatives are trapped on Earth, and they encourage Zephyr to use his powers to assist them when possible. After retrieving the sixth orb, Zephyr finds the tunnel where the Fire Flyers had captured Nimbus. Nimbus, barely conscious, warns Zephyr cryptically about the universe being backwards before passing out. With Nimbus rescued, Zephyr and his army of Wind Warriors head to their next destination where another earthquake occurs. Nimbus once again tries to warn Zephyr and convince him to stop, but he passes out. Believing that the Fire Flyers had harmed Nimbus, Zephyr captures the remaining batch of Fire Flyers in preparation to retrieve another orb belonging to Omegaton.

As Nimbus recovers, the squad prepares to retrieve another orb within the center of a fishing village. During the destruction of the second Totem, Omegaton reveals himself and claims the last orb for himself. It is here, where it revealed that Omegaton originates from an anti-matter universe where everything is in reversed. A hero in Omegaton's dimension is a villain in Zephyr's. Feeling appalled that Zephyr was aiding a monster, Zephyr seeks out to defeat Omegaton within the fishing village. His plan backfires when Omegaton makes his way towards the center of Tokyo, leading to a final confrontation between the Wind Warriors and Omegaton. The game ends with Zephyr shattering Omegaton's orbs of power, thus defeating him once and for all. With Omegaton defeated, Nimbus explains to Zephyr about the truth about the true purpose of the Fire Flyers and the Totems. The Totems, initially believed to be causing the causing earthquakes that Zephyr and his team were encountering were actually made to keep Omegaton at bay. In reality, the earthquakes were caused by Omegaton becoming more powerful with each reunited orb. The Fire Flyers were an elite squad sent to Earth to ensure that Omegaton never regained his orbs of power, something that Zephyr and his team were unaware of during their initial plans of supposedly aiding Omegaton.

=== Endings ===
Tornado Outbreak features two endings that depend on the player's progression. In the normal ending, Zephyr, accompanied by Nimbus and the Wind Warriors, chooses to stay on Earth to help rescue the Stone Stompers and Water Whirls banished by Omegaton. In the alternate ending, Zephyr, Nimbus, and the Wind Warriors successfully rescue the stranded Stone Stompers and Water Whirls. After completing their mission, the ending shows Zephyr, Nimbus, and the Wind Warriors leaving Earth to return to their homeworld, Harmonia.

== Characters ==
Tornado Outbreak features a variety of characters represented by the different elements.

The primary cast featured American voice actors, with Mike Vaughn providing the voice for Zephyr. Actor and musician Lev Liberman voiced Nimbus, the Wind Warriors, and the Stone Stompers. Although not typically active in voice acting, Darci Morales, the game's producer, voiced the Water Whirls.

=== Air ===
- Zephyr - The main protagonist and the leader of the Wind Warriors. Initially described as an unlikely hero, Zephyr possesses the ability to transform into a destructive tornado that can level anything in his path.
- Nimbus - A former leader of the squadron of Wind Warriors. Passing the torch onto his protégé Zephyr, Nimbus now serves as the wise second-in command lieutenant, providing guidance and support.
- Wind Warriors - A group of unnamed, fearless air elementals appointed with the task of creating atmosphere on lifeless planets. They stand behind their leaders Zephyr and Nimbus and is willing to assist them in their mission.

=== Rock and Water ===
- Stone Stompers - Rock elementals who were banished to earth by Omegaton. They teach Zephyr the ability to Stone Stomp, a move that allows Zephyr to quickly destroy objects by pouncing on them.
- Water Whirls - Described as calm and fragile creatures, the Water Whirls are female water elementals who teach Zephyr the ability to dash with the tornado, enhancing his control over his formidable power.

=== Fire ===
- Fire Flyers - A group of mischievous fire elementals who invade earth to play an endless game of hide and seek in which Zephyr, the protagonist is required to collect and transport to the L.O.A.D. STARR.
- Omegaton - The main antagonist of the game. Omegaton is a powerful fire elemental who initially was outnumbered and weakened by his enemies where he was banished into space left to perish. However, upon being discovered by Zephyr, Nimbus, and the Wind Warriors, Omegaton used deceptive coercion to get them into retrieving his orbs of power.

== Gameplay ==
The player destroying several buildings to collect the fire elementals known as Fire Flyers.

Tornado Outbreak's gameplay is often compared to the Katamari series. Players assume the role of Zephyr, starting as a small tornado that gradually grows by collecting objects. Players are required to stay within a shaded area at all times generated by the L.O.A.D. STARR, as Wind Warriors will die in direct sunlight. Each level consists of sections known as zones. The initial three involve Zephyr wreaking havoc on the environment and capturing Fire Flyers hidden beneath objects, symbolized by an orange glow emanating from the object. After collecting 50 Fire Flyers, players can choose to either continue the search for the remaining Fire Flyers or proceed to the next zone. Each zone's completion is given a score, influenced by the number of Fire Flyers collected consecutively. In addition to a score, a single Totem ascends from the ground.

After completing all three zones, Zephyr must participate in a Vortex Race to create a powerful tornado capable of destroying the Totems. The race begins slowly but gains momentum over time. Completing a full circle around the map concludes one lap; after three laps, Zephyr engages in a Totem Battle.

During Totem Battles, players steer Zephyr's tornado through a moving maze of clouds while defending his Wind Warriors from any fireballs launched by the Totems. When Zephyr gets close enough to a Totem, a button-mashing mini-game is triggered, leading to the Totem's arm being destroyed. Upon the destruction of all Totems, Omegaton's orb is revealed, unlocking the next level.

== Development ==
Development of Tornado Outbreak started in July 2006. A PlayStation Portable port of the game was in consideration but was scrapped in favor of the PlayStation 3. The game was originally named Tornado Alley and focused around the premise of causing as much destruction within a given time limit.

=== Loose Cannon Studios ===
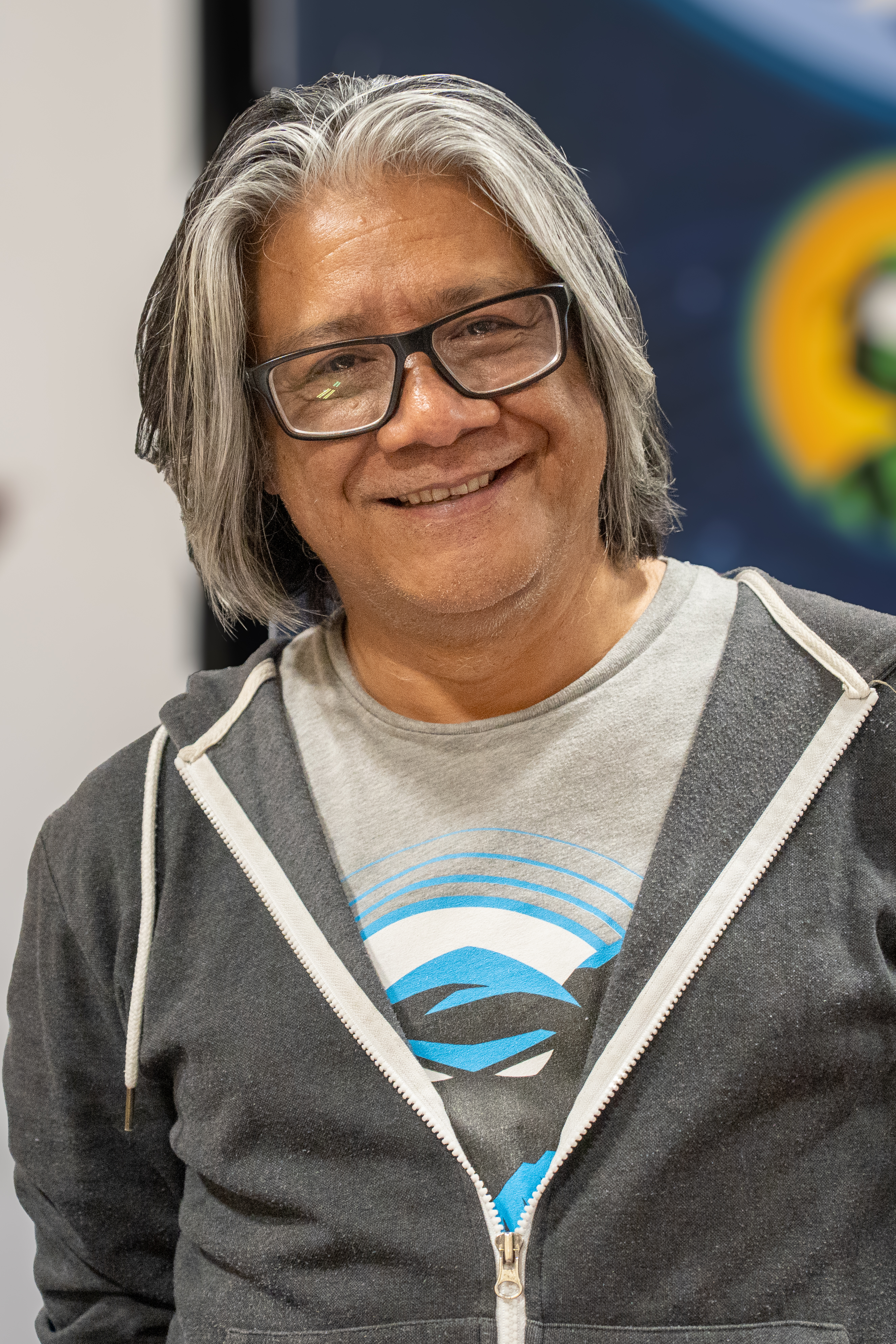
Dev Madan at Comic Con Oakland 2026

Following the completion of Sly 3: Honor Among Thieves, Dev Madan and Matthew Scott left Sucker Punch Productions to form Loose Cannon Studios with Ricci Rukavina serving as co-founder.

Loose Cannon would go defunct without producing another game by 2010, with Dev Madan and Matthew Scott moving on to PopCap Games and Ricci Rukavina to found Kung Fu Factory.

=== Announcement ===
The game's development was first publicly announced on June 3, 2009, under the title Zephyr: Rise of the Elementals. On July 9, 2009, the game received a new title, Tornado Outbreak.

=== Comic ===
As part of marketing material to promote the release of Tornado Outbreak, Loose Cannon Studios and Konami Digital Entertainment put together a ten page comic that serves as a prequel to the events of the game. The comic covers the backstory and origin of Zephyr, Nimbus, and the Wind Warriors and explains how Zephyr became leader of the Wind Warriors.

== Reception ==
Reception

Aggregate score
Aggregator	Score
Metacritic	PS3: 69% Wii: 71% Xbox 360: 62%

Review scores
Publication	Score
Game Informer	6.75 out of 10
GameSpot	6.5 out of 10
IGN	8.1 out of 10
Nintendo Power	6.5 out of 10

The game got moderate to good reviews. GameSpot gave it 6.5 out of 10, Game Informer game it 6.75 out of 10, and IGN gave it 8.1 out of 10.
