= G1 Jockey =

Video game series

- Genre: Horse racing
- Developers: Koei; Koei Tecmo; Kou Shibusawa
- Publishers: Koei; Koei Tecmo
- Platforms: PlayStation, PlayStation 2, PlayStation 3, Wii, Xbox 360, Nintendo Switch
- First release: G1 Jockey: JP: 1999
- Latest release: Champion Jockey Special: JP: September 14, 2017

G1 Jockey (called GI Jockey in Japan) is a simulation video game series developed and published by Koei (now Koei Tecmo). simulates horse racing from a jockey's perspective. Games have been released on the PlayStation, PlayStation 2, PlayStation 3 and also on the Wii, Xbox 360 and Nintendo Switch. It is distinct from a similar series by Koei Tecmo named Winning Post.

The original and its two sequels contain quick training race modes as well as a longer career mode. The racing itself has an emphasis on subtle strategy, e.g. playing with the horse's individual characteristics in mind. Horses individual characteristics include Front runner horses which prefer a spot in the top of the pack during the course of the race; drop in horses which require a constant pace to reach its maximum potential for the final spurt; drop out horses which require precise timing to make a move to the top and sprint down to the finish; and hold up horses which strength is to save up potential and start the spurt earlier than any other horse. This horse favors a quick pace race to demonstrate its full abilities.

The third game of the series, G1 Jockey 3, launched the Koei series into the spotlight.

The Wii releases (G1 Jockey Wii and G1 Jockey Wii 2008) do not follow the same numbering structure as those released on PlayStation consoles.

== Games ==
=== G1 Jockey ===
G1 Jockey
- Developer: Koei
- Publisher: Koei
- Platform: PlayStation
- Release: JP: March 11, 1999
- Genre: Horse racing
- Modes: Single-player, multiplayer

G1 Jockey is a horse racing simulator developed and published by Koei released on March 11, 1999, for the PlayStation console in Japan.

=== G1 Jockey 2 ===
G1 Jockey 2
- Developer: Koei
- Publishers: JP: Koei; EU: THQ
- Platform: PlayStation 2
- Release: JP: November 2, 2000; JP: March 22, 2001 (2001 Ver.); EU: March 8, 2002
- Genre: Horse racing
- Modes: Single-player, multiplayer

G1 Jockey 2 is a sports game, developed by Koei/Inis and published by Koei, which was released in Japan on November 2, 2000. It is the first game in the series to be made for the PlayStation 2 console.

An updated version of the game titled G1 Jockey 2 2001 was released in Japan on March 22, 2001. This edition would later be localized for the European market and published by THQ on March 8, 2002, released with the revised title G1 Jockey (as the previous titles were released only in Japan).

=== G1 Jockey 3 ===
G1 Jockey 3 is a thoroughbred horse racing simulation video game produced by Koei for the PlayStation 2. Although the G1 Jockey series had been gaining popularity in Japan, this was the first game in the series to be released in North America. In contrast to Tecmo's Gallop Racer series, which focuses on every aspect of horse racing (including breeding), G1 Jockey 3 focuses solely on the jockey.

=== G1 Jockey 4 ===
G1 Jockey 4 is a horse racing simulator published by Koei for the PlayStation 2.

A Wii version of the game called G1 Jockey Wii was released in 2007.

=== G1 Jockey 4 2007 ===
G1 Jockey 4 2007
- Developer: Koei
- Publisher: Koei
- Platforms: PlayStation 2, PlayStation 3
- Release: JPN: November 1, 2007
- Genre: Horse racing
- Modes: Single-player, multiplayer

G1 Jockey 4 2007 (ジーワンジョッキー4 2007) is a horse racing simulator published by Koei for the PlayStation 2 and PlayStation 3 in Japan on November 1, 2007. It is the sequel of G1 Jockey 4.

A playable demo was released on the Japanese PlayStation Store in October 2007.

A G1 Jockey 4 2007 and Winning Post 7 Maximum 2007 Premium Pack bundle for both the PlayStation 2 and PlayStation 3 versions was released on November 1, 2007.

=== Champion Jockey: G1 Jockey & Gallop Racer ===
After Koei merged with Tecmo in 2009 to form the joint company Tecmo Koei, Koei then developed Champion Jockey: G1 Jockey & Gallop Racer for the PlayStation 3, Wii and Xbox 360, becoming the first game in either series to be available on a Microsoft console and have a Nintendo console version localized for North America. The game is a crossover with Tecmo's Gallop Racer series and incorporates elements from both the G1 Jockey and Gallop Racer series, while also supporting motion controllers. A Japan-exclusive Nintendo Switch port, titled Champion Jockey Special, was released in 2017.
