= Winning Post =

Video game series

- The first game in the series for Mega-CD
- Genre: Simulation
- Developers: Koei; Koei Tecmo; Kou Shibusawa
- Publishers: Koei; Koei Tecmo
- First release: Winning Post; January 14, 1993
- Latest release: Winning Post 10; March 30, 2023

Winning Post is a thoroughbred horse racing simulation video game series developed and published by Koei (now Koei Tecmo). The series is distinct from Koei's other horse-racing franchise, G1 Jockey, and Tecmo's Gallop Racer series. To date, the only version of the game to be released outside of Japan was the Saturn port of Winning Post EX, released in North America as Winning Post. All of the other games have only been released in Japan.

== Games ==
- Winning Post - PC-9801 (January 14, 1993), X68000 (May 28, 1993), Super Famicom (September 10, 1993), Mega-CD (September 17, 1993), 3DO (September 16, 1994), PC98 (1995)

- Winning Post EX - PlayStation (December 29, 1995), Saturn (August 11, 1995)

- Winning Post 2 - Super Famicom (March 18, 1995), PlayStation, Saturn (March 22, 1996)

- Winning Post 2: Program '96 - Super Famicom, PlayStation, Saturn (October 4, 1996)
- Winning Post 2: Final '97 - PlayStation, Saturn (October 2, 1997)
- Winning Post Advance - Game Boy Advance (March 21, 2001)

- Winning Post 3 - PlayStation (February 26, 1998), Saturn (April 2, 1998)

- Winning Post 3: Program '98 - PlayStation (October 1, 1998), Saturn (December 3, 1998)

- Winning Post 4 - PlayStation (September 18, 1999)

- Winning Post 4 Program 2000 - PlayStation (March 23, 2000), Dreamcast (March 30, 2000)
- Winning Post 4 Maximum - PlayStation 2 (September 28, 2000)
- Winning Post 4 Maximum 2001 - PlayStation 2 (March 22, 2001)

- Winning Post 5 - PlayStation 2 (December 22, 2001)

- Winning Post 5 Maximum 2002 - PlayStation 2 (September 19, 2002)
- Winning Post 5 Maximum 2003 - PlayStation 2 ( May 29, 2003)

- Winning Post 6 - PlayStation 2 (August 28, 2003)

- Winning Post 6 with Power-Up Kit - Windows (November 21, 2003)
- Winning Post 6 Maximum 2004 - PlayStation 2 (May 20, 2004)
- Winning Post 6: 2005 Nendoban Related Games - PlayStation 2 (February 24, 2005) - released as a standalone and combined with G1 Jockey 3
- Winning Post 6 2006 - PlayStation Portable (August 24, 2006)
- Winning Post 6 2008 - PlayStation Portable (June 26, 2008)

- Winning Post 7 - PlayStation 2 (August 25, 2005)

- Winning Post 7 Maximum 2006 - PlayStation 2 (March 16, 2006)
- Winning Post 7 Maximum 2007 - PlayStation 3, PlayStation 2 (March 29, 2007)
- Winning Post 7 Maximum 2008 - Windows (February 15, 2008), Wii, PlayStation 3, PlayStation 2 (March 13, 2008)
- Winning Post 7 2009 - PlayStation Portable (October 1, 2009)
- Winning Post 7 2010 - Windows (August 27, 2010), PlayStation 3, PlayStation Portable (August 22, 2010)
- Winning Post 7 2012 - PlayStation 3, PlayStation Portable (March 15, 2012)
- Winning Post 7 2013 - PlayStation 3, PlayStation Portable, PlayStation Vita, Windows (March 14, 2013)

- Winning Post World - Windows (February 20, 2009), Wii, PlayStation 3, PlayStation 2 (April 2, 2009)
- Winning Post World 2010 - Xbox 360, Wii, PlayStation 3, PlayStation 2 (February 20, 2010)
- Winning Post 8 - (March 27, 2014)

- Winning Post 8 2015 - (March 5, 2015)
- Winning Post 8 2016 - Windows, PlayStation 3, PlayStation Vita (March 27, 2014), PlayStation 4 (March 31, 2016)
- Winning Post 8 2017 - Windows, PlayStation 3, PlayStation 4, PlayStation Vita, Nintendo Switch (2017)
- Winning Post 8 2018 - Windows, PlayStation 4, PlayStation Vita, Nintendo Switch (2018)

- Winning Post 9 - Windows, PlayStation 4, Nintendo Switch (2019)

- Winning Post 9 2020 - Windows, PlayStation 4, Nintendo Switch (March 11, 2020)
- Winning Post 9 2021 - Windows, PlayStation 4, Nintendo Switch (March 18, 2021)
- Winning Post 9 2022 - Windows, PlayStation 4, Nintendo Switch (March 31, 2022)

- Winning Post 10 - Windows, PlayStation 4, PlayStation 5, Nintendo Switch (March 30, 2023)

- Winning Post 10 2024 - Windows, PlayStation 4, PlayStation 5, Nintendo Switch (March 28, 2024)
- Winning Post 10 2025 - Windows, PlayStation 4, PlayStation 5, Nintendo Switch (March 27, 2025)
- Winning Post 10 2026 - Windows, PlayStation 4, PlayStation 5, Nintendo Switch, Nintendo Switch 2 (March 26, 2026)
