= SpongeBob Moves In! =

2013 video game

- App cover
- Developer: Kung Fu Factory
- Publisher: Nickelodeon
- Series: SpongeBob SquarePants
- Platforms: iOS, Android
- Release: June 6, 2013 - June 24, 2021 (8 years, 18 days)
- Genre: City-building
- Mode: Single-player

SpongeBob Moves In! was a city-building game originally created and developed by Los Angeles–based game developer Kung Fu Factory and published and distributed by Nickelodeon; the video game is based on the American animated television series SpongeBob SquarePants. It was first released for iOS on June 6, 2013, and became delisted and inactive on June 24, 2021.

In the game, players could build Bikini Bottom to their own tastes and were tasked with keeping the residents happy by making all their wishes fulfilled. As players advanced in the game, they could unlock exclusive-to-the-app stories about how their characters first arrived in the town. These stories were written by the show's writing staff, and were told through animated shorts. A spiritual successor to the game, SpongeBob Adventures: In a Jam, was published by Tilting Point and released on digital storefronts in early 2023.

== Gameplay ==
Gameplay in process

In SpongeBob Moves In!, players can customize the look of Bikini Bottom with different characters, buildings, and accessories. In the ongoing quest to keep the residents happy by granting their wishes, players can fill the town's happiness meter by collecting happiness. The Bikini Bottom inhabitants wish for food and gifts from various Bikini Bottom establishments, such as Krabby Patties from the Krusty Krab. Once their wish was granted, the player could collect gold coins, happiness, or a recipe to add to their collection. When the happiness meter is filled, players advance to the next level in the game, earning coins, game experience, and unlocking more quests, buildings, and accessories to buy in the store.

Throughout the game, players earn gold coins and jellyfish jelly as rewards for performing various activities like fulfilling wishes, adding buildings, making recipes, collecting rent, and expanding their city. Players could purchase additional land area, ingredients, buildings, and decorations using the game coins and jellyfish jelly they earned.

== Release ==
The game was released worldwide through the App Store for iPhone, iPad, and iPod Touch on June 6, 2013. Steve Youngwood, the General Manager for Digital at the Nickelodeon Group said "Millions of fans around the world experience the fun and magic of SpongeBob on television every day, and now they can live out their very own Bikini Bottom adventures with SpongeBob Moves In! whenever and wherever they want." The game cost $3.99 (prior to $1.99 on release) to purchase, but then had in-app purchases ranging in price from $0.99 up to $99.99.

== Closure ==
In early 2021, it was revealed that SpongeBob Moves In! would close at the end of May 2021. No reason was provided on the cause of the closure, but it was most likely due to expiring licensing rights. Despite this, the game could still be downloaded and played until June 24, 2021, when it was officially removed from digital storefronts.

== Reception ==
"If you've played freemium builders before, there's little to hold your interest in SpongeBob Moves In!, besides the licence. It's a pretty standard take on the genre, and you'll rarely feel rewarded for progress you make."

— Stuart Dredge, Pocket Gamer

Since the release of the game, SpongeBob Moves In! was one of the top apps on the App Store. For the week ending July 1, 2013, the game ranked at #6 at the App Store Official Charts of Top Paid iPhone Apps, and on #4 at the Top Paid iPad Apps. The following week, the game was ranked at #5 at the Top Paid iPad Apps.

SpongeBob Moves In! received mixed reviews from critics, mainly due to the in-app purchases that are expensive. Peter Willington of Pocket Gamer said "I do still love the music, and it's clearly the best aspect of the game - but if that's what you're after then you're probably better off watching this rather than shelling out your hard-earned money." SpongeBob Moves In! is also among the ten mobile games for kids with £69.99 in-app purchase options, as chosen by The Guardian staff Stuart Dredge. Amy Cheung of iTouchApps.com said "For the love of god if you do download this for your kids make sure your in app purchases are turned off or else you can expect a pretty hefty credit card bill at the end of the month." She added "To me SpongeBob Moves In! offers nothing new and the fact that it is not even a free download makes this a game I in no way can recommend." David Oxford of Slide To Play said "Crazy how the more meta aspects of the game are more interesting and truer to the show than the actual game itself, isn't it?"

Pip Elwood of Entertainment-Focus gave the game 6 out of 10 stars and wrote "SpongeBob Moves In! is an addictive game. We whiled away hours playing it and found it a joy to be immersed in Bikini Bottom." He added "We think the in-app purchases should be reconsidered but overall we enjoyed it."
