= G1 Jockey 3 =

2002 video game

- Developer: Koei
- Publishers: WW: Koei; EU: THQ
- Series: G1 Jockey
- Platform: PlayStation 2
- Release: JP: December 21, 2002; EU: March 21, 2003; NA: May 28, 2003
- Genre: Horse racing
- Modes: Single-player, multiplayer

G1 Jockey 3 (ジーワンジョッキー3, Jī Wan Jokkī 3) is a thoroughbred horse racing simulation video game produced by Koei for the PlayStation 2. Although the G1 Jockey series had been gaining popularity in Japan, this was the first game in the series to be released in North America. In contrast to Tecmo's Gallop Racer series, which focuses on every aspect of horse racing (including breeding), G1 Jockey 3 focuses solely on the jockey.

== Reception ==
Reception

Aggregate score
| Aggregator | Score |
|---|---|
| Metacritic | 71/100 |

Review scores
| Publication | Score |
|---|---|
| 4Players | 64% |
| Famitsu | 29/40 |
| Game Informer | 8/10 |
| GamesMaster | 60% |
| GameSpot | 6.2/10 |
| GameSpy | 3/5 |
| GameZone | 7.8/10 |
| Official U.S. PlayStation Magazine | 3.5/5 |
| PlayStation: The Official Magazine | 7/10 |
| X-Play | 3/5 |

The game received "mixed or average reviews" according to the review aggregation website Metacritic. GameSpot's Ryan Davis said that while the game is not very different from the Gallop Racer series, he called it a more focused, more satisfying experience in which the horse racing is a real thing. He described the presentation of the game "modest", and the game mechanics "too baroque". In Japan, Famitsu gave it a score of 29 out of 40.
