= Spartacus Legends =

2013 video game

- Developer: Kung Fu Factory
- Publisher: Ubisoft
- Designer: Stephen Cluff
- Writer: Allison Miller
- Composer: Joe LoDuca
- Platforms: PlayStation 3, Xbox 360
- Release: PlayStation 3: NA: June 25, 2013; PAL: August 7, 2013; Xbox 360; June 26, 2013
- Genre: Fighting
- Modes: Single-player, multiplayer

Spartacus Legends is a discontinued free-to-play video game based on the Starz television series Spartacus. Developed by Kung Fu Factory and published by Ubisoft, Spartacus Legends was released on PlayStation Network and Xbox Live in 2013. On December 22, 2015, Spartacus Legends was discontinued.

== Reception ==
Reception

Aggregate score
Aggregator	Score
Metacritic	(PS3) 50/100 (X360) 45/100

Review scores
Publication	Score
GameRevolution	(PS3) 6/10
GamesMaster	(X360) 48%
GameZone	(X360) 4.5/10
MeriStation	(X360) 6/10
PlayStation Official Magazine – Australia	(PS3) 30%
Official Xbox Magazine (UK)	(X360) 2/10
Push Square	(PS3) 6/10

The PlayStation 3 version received "mixed" reviews, while the Xbox 360 version received "unfavorable" reviews, according to the review aggregation website Metacritic.

Nicholas Tan of GameRevolution praised the amount of content the PS3 version had on offer, but criticized the difficulty and lack of polish in said console version.
