= Zombie Apocalypse: Never Die Alone =

2011 shoot'em up video game

- Developer: Backbone Entertainment
- Publisher: Konami
- Platforms: PlayStation 3, Xbox 360
- Release: PlayStation Network: NA: October 25, 2011; PAL: November 9, 2011; Xbox Live Arcade; October 26, 2011
- Genre: Action
- Modes: Single-player, multiplayer

Zombie Apocalypse: Never Die Alone is a downloadable shoot 'em up game published by Konami in 2011 for the PlayStation 3 and Xbox 360. It is a sequel to 2009's Zombie Apocalypse, starring four new heroes.

== Gameplay ==
The player controls one of the four heroes, defending against zombies. Items dropped by survivors can be used. The game emphasizes cooperative play, with squad-based mechanics and resource distribution amongst the players.

== Reception ==
Reception

Aggregate score
| Aggregator | Score | |
| Aggregator | PS3 | Xbox 360 |
|---|---|---|
| Metacritic | 67/100 | 62/100 |

Review scores
| Publication | Score | |
| Publication | PS3 | Xbox 360 |
|---|---|---|
| 4Players | N/A | 75% |
| GamePro | 3/5 | 3/5 |
| GamesMaster | N/A | 85% |
| IGN | 7.5/10 | 7.5/10 |
| PlayStation Official Magazine – UK | 6/10 | N/A |
| Official Xbox Magazine (UK) | N/A | 3/10 |
| Official Xbox Magazine (US) | N/A | 7/10 |
| Play | 69% | N/A |
| PlayStation: The Official Magazine | 7/10 | N/A |
| TeamXbox | N/A | 6.8/10 |

The game received "mixed or average reviews" on both platforms according to the review aggregation website Metacritic.
