= Winning Post 7 Maximum 2008 =

- Developer: Koei
- Publisher: Koei
- Series: Winning Post
- Platforms: PlayStation 3, PlayStation 2, Wii, Microsoft Windows
- Release: JP: March 13, 2008
- Genre: Horse racing
- Mode: Single-player

Winning Post 7 Maximum 2008 (ウイニングポスト7 マキシマム2008) is a multiplatform horse racing simulator published by Koei for the PlayStation 2, PlayStation 3, Wii and Microsoft Windows It was released only in Japan on March 13, 2008. The game is the sequel to Winning Post 7 Maximum 2007.

== See also ==
- Winning Post 7 Maximum 2007
- Winning Post 7 2009
- Winning Post World 2010
