= Winning Post 7 Maximum 2007 =

2007 video game

- Developer: Koei
- Publisher: Koei
- Series: Winning Post
- Platforms: PlayStation 3, PlayStation 2
- Release: JP: March 29, 2007
- Genre: Horse racing
- Mode: Single-player

Winning Post 7 Maximum 2007 (ウイニングポスト7 マキシマム2007) is a horse racing simulator published by Koei for the PlayStation 2 and PlayStation 3 in Japan on March 29, 2007. It is the sequel of Winning Post 7 and is followed by Winning Post 7 Maximum 2008.

== Premium Pack ==
A Winning Post 7 Maximum 2007 and G1 Jockey 4 2007 Premium Pack bundle for both the PlayStation 2 and PlayStation 3 versions was released on November 1, 2007.

== See also ==
- Winning Post 7 Maximum 2008
- G1 Jockey 4 2007
- G1 Jockey 4 2008
