= Supremacy MMA =

2011 video game

- Xbox 360 PAL region box art of Supremacy MMA
- Developer: Kung Fu Factory
- Publisher: 505 Games
- Platforms: PlayStation 3, Xbox 360, PlayStation Vita
- Release: Xbox 360, PlayStation 3: NA: September 20, 2011; EU: September 23, 2011; AU: September 29, 2011; PlayStation Vita: NA: March 27, 2012; EU: May 11, 2012
- Genres: Sports, Fighting
- Modes: Single-player, Multiplayer

Supremacy MMA is a fighting video game developed by Kung Fu Factory and published by 505 Games. The game was released on September 20, 2011 in North America, September 23 in Europe, and September 29 in Australia for the PlayStation 3 and Xbox 360 game consoles. It was also ported to the PlayStation Vita on March 27, 2012 in North America, and May 11 in Europe, under the title Supremacy MMA: Unrestricted, with several exclusive venues, 2 exclusive fighters and both of the Pre-order DLC fighters.

== Gameplay ==
The game takes players through an underground amateur mixed martial arts circuit as their character attempts to achieve fame within the game. GameZone contrasted this competition style to that of other MMA titles such as UFC Undisputed 2010 or EA Sports MMA which it said, "take a professional, technical approach to mixed martial arts".

As a fight progresses, competitors faces can become swollen and bruised after being punched repeatedly, and blood from the fighters begins to coat the ground. IGN reviewer Greg Miller stated that he gasped when witnessing one of the knockout animations.

== Roster ==
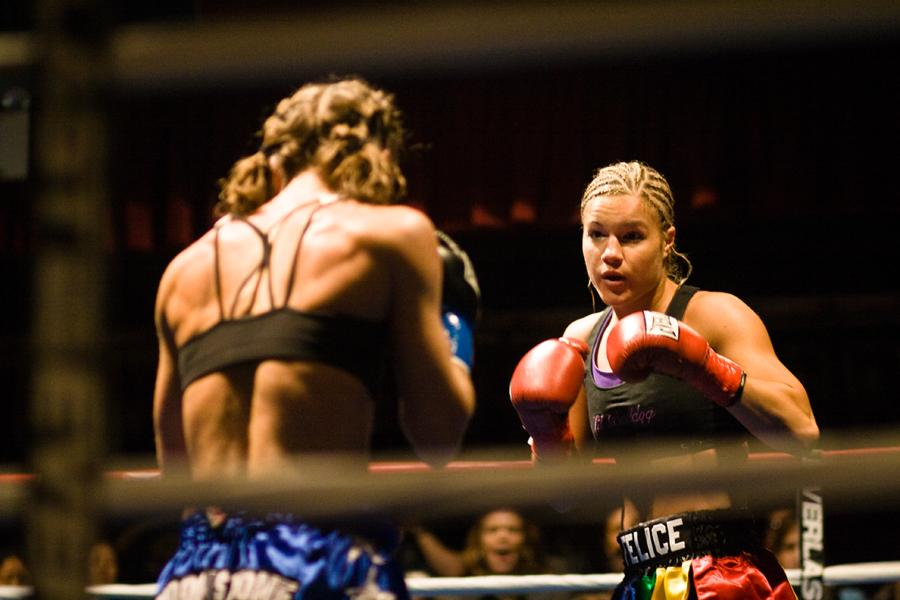
Supremacy MMA is the second MMA video game to include female fighters. One of the fighters from the game, Felice Herrig (right), is shown here in a real life match with Emily Bearden (left).

Supremacy MMA is the second mixed martial arts video game to allow players to fight using female fighters, after the inclusion of Erica Montoya in 2004's UFC: Sudden Impact. The two female fighters in the game are based on the real life MMA fighters Felice Herrig and Michele Guitierrez.

The full roster includes the following fighters and their respective real world inspirations:

- St. John Ackland (Devon Schwan) – Submission Wrestling
- Dante Algearey (Jason Yorrick) – Kickboxing
- Pre-order DLC/PS VITA: Shane del Rosario (Shane del Rosario) – MMA
- Michele Guitierrez (Michele Gutierrez) – Kickboxing
- Yuki Hashimoto (Steve Kim) – Karate
- Tomo Hashimoto (Fernando Chien) – Judo
- Felice Herrig (Felice Herrig) – Muay Thai
- Ilya Klimenko (Nikolai Ruabtsev) – Wrestling
- Jerome Le Banner (Jerome Le Banner) – Kickboxing
- Unlockable: Pierre Matiss (Joe Schilling) – Savate
- Unlockable: Mariano Mendoza (Mariano Mendoza) – Boxing
- Jens Pulver (Jens Pulver) – Boxing
- Pre-order DLC/PS VITA: Bao Quach (Bao Quach) – Karate
- Demian Reis (Giva Santana) – Brazilian Jiu Jitsu
- Jack Saxon (Brent Cooper) – MMA
- Malaipet Sitarvut (Malaipet) – Muay Thai
- PS VITA Exclusive: Jason Yee (Jason Yee) – Jeet Kune Do
- PS VITA Exclusive: Novell Bell (Novell Bell) – San Shao/Kung Fu

== Development ==
Supremacy MMA was announced on June 11, 2010, and the publishers stated it would be shown that year at E3 2010. The game was originally slated for a June 2011 release, but was not released until September 2011.

== Reception ==
Reception

Aggregate score
Aggregator	Score
Metacritic	47 / 100 (Xbox 360); 48 / 100 (PS3)

Review scores
Publication	Score
GamePro	2.5/5
IGN	5.0 / 10
Official Xbox Magazine (US)	4.5 / 10

The game received generally negative reviews upon release with review aggregator Metacritic rating the Xbox 360 version with a score of 47 out of 100 and the PlayStation 3 version a score of 48 out of 100. Greg Miller of IGN criticized the game stating that it suffered from animations which appear stiff, poor quality voice acting, and latency issues during online play, although he noted that even worse than these problems was the game's poor controls. While performing his review of the game, Greg Miller created a preview video showing the choppy animations, unresponsive controls, and echoing sound effects present during online matches, concluding the video stating, "I don't like this game very much." GamePro appreciated the similarity between the fighters' depictions and their real life counterparts, but criticized the fighting system, musical soundtrack, and gratuitous violence particularly during the Mortal Kombat–style finishing moves, which often result in broken limbs or necks and do not follow the style of typical MMA fighting.
