= RC Cars =

2002 video game

- Developer: Creat Games
- Publishers: EU: 1C Company (PC); NA: Whiptail Interactive (PC); WW: Metro3D (PS2, PSN); EU: TikGames (PSN); AU: Creat Games (PSN)
- Platforms: Microsoft Windows, PlayStation 2, PlayStation 3 (PSN Store)
- Release: Windows: RU: November 15, 2002; PAL: June 2003; NA: December 11, 2003; PlayStation 2: NA: August 13, 2003; EU: September 26, 2003; PlayStation 3: NA: August 20, 2009; PAL: August 27, 2009; Steam; October 18, 2011
- Genre: Vehicular combat game
- Modes: Single-player, multiplayer

RC Cars, also known as Smash Cars for the PlayStation 2 and PlayStation 3 versions, is a vehicular combat game developed by Creat Games for Microsoft Windows and PlayStation 2 in 2002-2003.

== Reception ==
Reception

Aggregate score
Aggregator	Score		
Aggregator	PC	PS2	PS3
Metacritic	65/100	67/100	61/100

Review scores
Publication	Score		
Publication	PC	PS2	PS3
Computer Games Magazine	3/5	N/A	N/A
Edge	N/A	7/10	N/A
Electronic Gaming Monthly	N/A	6/10	N/A
Famitsu	N/A	25/40	N/A
Game Informer	N/A	4/10	N/A
GameSpot	6.3/10	7.2/10	6.5/10
GameSpy	N/A	4/5	N/A
GameZone	7.5/10	7.5/10	N/A
IGN	7.5/10	7.5/10	7/10
PlayStation Official Magazine – UK	N/A	4/10	6/10
Official U.S. PlayStation Magazine	N/A	3.5/5	N/A
PC Gamer (US)	80%	N/A	N/A
X-Play	2/5	3/5	N/A

The game received "mixed or average reviews" on all platforms according to the review aggregation website Metacritic. Many reviewers gave the PlayStation 2 version mixed or unfavorable reviews, months before it was released Stateside. In Japan, where the PS2 version was ported and published by Psikyo under the name Buggy Grand Prix: Kattobi! Dai-Sakusen (バギーグランプリ 〜かっとび！大作戦〜, Bagī Guran Puri 〜Kattobi! Dai-Sakusen〜) on November 20, 2003, Famitsu gave it a score of 25 out of 40.
