= Kung Fu Factory =

American video game developer

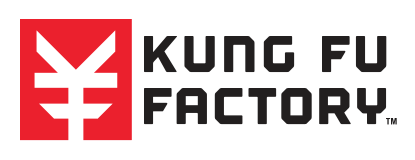
- Type: Subsidiary
- Industry: Video games
- Founded: 2002
- Headquarters: Los Angeles, California
- Number of employees: 70
- Parent: Netmarble (2021-present)
- Website: www.kungfufactory.com

Kung Fu Factory is an American video game developer located in Los Angeles, California in the United States.

== History ==
The company was formerly known as Just Games Interactive, which developed Mortal Kombat: Unchained and Mortal Kombat: Armageddon, and worked on UFC Undisputed 2009. Kung Fu Factory is the first third party developer to have worked on a Mortal Kombat game.

Recently the company has released several #1 Mobile games including the Adventure Time: Card Wars Series, SpongeBob Moves In, and Teenage Mutant Ninja Turtles: Rooftop Run. The company's latest Top Grossing mobile F2P game is WWE Champions, which was developed in partnership with Scopely and WWE. On February 19, 2021, it was announced by Kung Fu Factory that a majority stake of the company was acquired by Netmarble.

== Games ==
Mobile games

- NBA Ball Stars (TBA)
- Nickelodeon Kart Racers Game (2022)
- Hotel Transylvania: Blast (2019)
- Pacific Rim: Breach Wars (2018)
- WWE Champions (2017)
- Adventure Time: Card Wars Kingdoms (2016)
- Card King: Dragon Wars (2015)
- Pirate Bash (2014)
- Adventure Time: Card Wars (2014)
- Alone In The Dark - iOS port (2014)
- Slot Revolution (2013)
- Domo Jump (2013)
- Teenage Mutant Ninja Turtles: Rooftop Run (2013)
- SpongeBob Moves In (2013)

Console games

- Spartacus Legends (2013)
- Girl Fight (2013)
- Bellator: MMA Onslaught (2012)
- Supremacy MMA: Unrestricted (2012)
- Supremacy MMA (2011)
- Hello Kitty Seasons

As Just Games Interactive

- Mortal Kombat: Unchained (2006)
- Mortal Kombat: Armageddon (2007)
- Cruis'n (2007)
