= Zombie Apocalypse (video game) =

2009 video game

- Title art
- Developer: Nihilistic Software
- Publisher: Konami
- Directors: Robert Huebner; Yujin Kiem; Jon Knoles; Leo Martinez; Brandon Moro; Martha Richter Smith
- Producers: Stella Balmoria; Steve Hutchins
- Designers: Tim Miller; Jon Slavin
- Programmers: Yves Borckmans; Mark Cooke; Benjamin Goldstein; Vic Keenan
- Artists: Shao Wen Lim; Mike Parsons; Jasmine Sarmiento; Michael Teperson
- Composer: Will Loconto
- Platforms: PlayStation 3, Xbox 360
- Release: XBLA; September 23, 2009; PSN; September 24, 2009
- Genre: Shoot 'em up
- Modes: Single-player, multiplayer

Zombie Apocalypse is a 2009 downloadable action shoot 'em up video game developed by Nihilistic Software and published by Konami.

In 2011, a sequel was released, Zombie Apocalypse: Never Die Alone.

== Gameplay ==
Zombie Apocalypse is a multidirectional shoot 'em up. The player controls one of four characters through 55 levels set in seven different areas. The player must rescue survivors, and kill waves of zombies using a range of weapons and the environment. Use of environmental kills rewards the player with more points for their score. Every five kills awards the player with another score multiplier, which resets to one upon death. Each of the game's modes can be played in single or multiplayer.

There are 12 trophies/achievements available. Playing through the game unlocks new modes.

== Development ==
Nihilistic sought to make a pure arcade shooter, akin to Robotron 2084 and Smash TV. Inspiration for the environments and characters was taken from zombie films, including Night of the Living Dead and Return of the Living Dead.

== Reception ==
Reception

Aggregate score
Aggregator	Score	
Aggregator	PS3	Xbox 360
Metacritic	61/100	66/100

Review scores
Publication	Score	
Publication	PS3	Xbox 360
1Up.com	D+	D+
Destructoid	7/10	N/A
GamePro	4/5	4/5
GameRevolution	C−	C−
GameSpot	7.5/10	7.5/10
Giant Bomb	2/5	2/5
IGN	6.5/10	6.5/10
PlayStation Official Magazine – UK	6/10	N/A
Official Xbox Magazine (US)	N/A	8/10
TeamXbox	N/A	7.6/10

The game received "mixed or average reviews" on both platforms according to the review aggregation website Metacritic. IGN said, "[Zombie Apocalypse]...is inconsequential." GameSpot called it "Robotron: 2084 with zombies...what it lacks in innovation it more than makes up for with good, mindless fun." Destructoid praised the variety of zombies in the PlayStation 3 version review, but added "by the time you hit your 25th night, you've pretty much seen them all." However, 1Up.com criticized the repetition, as well as the difficulty level and enemy variety, saying, "Worse than simply being tedious, though, is how jaw-grindingly frustrating Zombie Apocalypse becomes. As the game wears on, absurd variants...replace the run-of-the-mill brain-eaters."
