= Frogger (disambiguation) =

Frogger is a 1981 video game.

Frogger may also refer to:

- Frogger (series), video game series published by Konami
- Frogger (1997 video game), a remake and expansion of the original game
- "The Frogger", S9E18 of Seinfeld
- "Frogger", a song by Bad Religion from their 1985 EP Back to the Known
- Joe Frogger, traditional New England cookie

== See also ==
- Frogger 2 (disambiguation)
- Frogging (disambiguation)
- Frog (disambiguation)
