= Frogger 2 =

Frogger 2 is the title of four video games:

- Frogger II: ThreeeDeep! (1984)
- Frogger 2: Swampy's Revenge (2000)
- Frogger's Adventures 2: The Lost Wand (2002)
- Frogger 2 (2008 video game) (2008)
