= Frogger's Adventures: Temple of the Frog =

2001 video game

- North American box art
- Developer(s): Konami Software Shanghai
- Publisher(s): Konami
- Director(s): Shi Lei
- Composer(s): Stephen Geering
- Series: Frogger
- Platform(s): Game Boy Advance
- Release: NA: November 22, 2001; EU: November 30, 2001
- Genre(s): Platform
- Mode(s): Single-player

Frogger's Adventures: Temple of the Frog is a 2001 platform video game developed and published by Konami for the Game Boy Advance. It was followed by Frogger's Adventures 2: The Lost Wand in 2002 for the same console. In 2003, another game titled Frogger's Adventures: The Rescue appeared for PlayStation 2, GameCube and Windows.

== Gameplay ==
In this game, Frogger searches five worlds for four sacred elements needed to rescue his friends and save his swamp. Lumpy, one of his friends, or someone else, will talk to him before every level to give him information. He must face 15 levels and five bosses, including his final showdown with the evil Mr. D to recover the elements and save his swamp.

== Reception ==
Reception

Aggregate scores
Aggregator	Score
GameRankings	71%
Metacritic	73/100

Review scores
Publication	Score
IGN	8/10
Nintendo Power	4/5

Frogger's Adventures: Temple of the Frog received generally positive reviews.

In the United States, Temple of the Frog sold 1.7 million copies and earned $28 million by August 2006. During the period between January 2000 and August 2006, it was the fifth highest-selling game launched for the Game Boy Advance, Nintendo DS or PlayStation Portable in the US.
