= Frogger 2 (2008 video game) =

- Developer(s): Voltex
- Publisher(s): Konami
- Director(s): Takeshi Kanda
- Series: Frogger
- Platform(s): Xbox 360
- Release: June 11, 2008
- Genre(s): Action
- Mode(s): Single-player, multiplayer

Frogger 2 is a 2008 action video game developed by Voltex and published by Konami as a sequel to the 1981 arcade game Frogger. It was released on Xbox Live Arcade for the Xbox 360 on June 11, 2008, and is the third game to be called Frogger 2, the others being Frogger II: ThreeeDeep! (1984) and Frogger 2: Swampy's Revenge (2000).

== Summary ==
Gameplay screenshot

Frogger 2 features fifteen levels set in five different environments which Frogger attempts to avoid obstacles and enemies and boss battles. The game also contains two multiplayer modes: Race and Jewel Duel. In Race mode, players compete to finish an original Frogger-style level in the fastest time. In Jewel Duel, players compete to claim a jewel.

== Reception ==
Reception

Aggregate score
Aggregator	Score
Metacritic	37/100

Review scores
Publication	Score
Eurogamer	4/10
IGN	5.5/10
Official Xbox Magazine (UK)	3/10
Official Xbox Magazine (US)	2/10
Retro Gamer	33%

The game received "generally unfavorable reviews" according to the review aggregation website Metacritic. GamePro said, "The crummy gameplay combined with Frogger 2's deceiving graphics (kids will struggle with this game) and jab-a-screwdriver-into-your-ear music make[s] this one of the worst titles available on XBLA." (Note: GamePro gave the game 2.5/5 for graphics, 1.25/5 for sound, and two 1.5/5 scores for control and fun factor.)

== See also ==
- Frogger II: ThreeeDeep!
- Frogger 2: Swampy's Revenge
