= Frogger (series) =

Video game series

- Genres: Action; Platform
- Developer: Various: Konami (1981, 2001 - 2011) Parker Brothers (1984) Sony Computer Entertainment Europe (1997) Blitz Games (2000) Game Titan (2000) Papa Yeti Studio (2001) Vicarious Visions (2002) Hudson Soft (2003 - 2005) Voltex (2008) Hijinx Studios (2009) Alpha Unit (2011) Q-Games (2019 - present)
- Publishers: Sega/Gremlin (1981); Parker Brothers (1984); Hasbro Interactive (1997 - 2000); Konami (2001 - present)
- Platform: Various: 3DS, Android, Arcade, Atari 2600, Atari 5200, ColecoVision, DS, Game.com, Game Boy, Game Boy Color, Game Boy Advance, Gakken Compact Vision TV Boy, Intellivision, iOS, Odyssey², PC, PlayStation, PlayStation 2, PlayStation 3, Sega Genesis, Super Nintendo Entertainment System, Wii, Windows, Xbox, Xbox 360
- First release: Frogger; August 1981
- Latest release: Frogger and the Rumbling Ruins; June 3, 2022

Frogger (Note: Japanese: フロッガー, Hepburn: Furoggā) is a video game series and media franchise created by designer Takahide Arima for Konami. The franchise's games are primarily top-down action platformers that follow Frogger, an anthropomorphic frog, crossing through hazardous terrain to reach an objective. The first game in the series was the 1981 arcade game Frogger, and new games in the series have been released in the following decades. In 2021, Frogger was adapted into a game show series on Peacock.

== Games ==
Release timeline Main series in bold
1981	**Frogger (1981)**
1982–1983
1984	**Frogger II: ThreeeDeep!**
1985–1996
1997	**Frogger (1997)**
1998–1999
2000	**Frogger 2: Swampy's Revenge**
2001	**Frogger: The Great Quest**
2001	Frogger's Adventures: Temple of the Frog
2002	**Frogger Beyond**
2002	Frogger's Adventures 2: The Lost Wand
2003	**Frogger's Adventures: The Rescue**
2003	Frogger's Journey: The Forgotten Relic
2004
2005	**Frogger: Ancient Shadow**
2005	Frogger: Helmet Chaos
2006	My Frogger Toy Trials
2007
2008	**Frogger 2**
2009	Frogger Returns
2010	Frogger Inferno
2011	**Frogger 3D**
2011	Frogger Decades
2012–2018
2019	**Frogger in Toy Town**
2020–2021
2022	**Frogger and the Rumbling Ruins**

The 1981 arcade game Frogger was developed by Konami and published internationally by Sega. The gameplay involves a frog trying to travel across roads and rivers of high traffic and danger. It was highly successful, being one of the first video game "smash hits", and "helped pushed the industry into the mainstream", according to PCMag. It was widely ported between 1982 and 1984 when Sega licensed Parker Brothers to develop the game for platforms including the Atari 2600 and Intellivision. A sequel, Frogger II: ThreeeDeep!, was released in 1984 for multiple consoles and computers.

In the 1990s, Konami licensed the property to Hasbro Interactive, which produced the 1997 video game Frogger for the PlayStation and Microsoft Windows. Hasbro sub-licensed console versions of the original game to Majesco, including a port for the Sega Genesis; this port was the final game released for the platform in North America. There was also a 1998 Game.com version named Frogger. A sequel, Frogger 2: Swampy's Revenge, was released in 2000 for the Dreamcast, Microsoft Windows, the PlayStation and the Game Boy Color.

The sixth generation of video game consoles, and sometimes Windows, were the platform for Frogger: The Great Quest in 2001, Frogger Beyond in 2002, Frogger's Adventures: The Rescue in 2003, Frogger: Ancient Shadow in 2005, and Konami Kids Playground: Frogger Hop, Skip & Jumpin' Fun for the PlayStation 2 in 2007. The Game Boy Advance had four Frogger games, Frogger's Adventures: Temple of the Frog in 2001, Frogger Advance: The Great Quest in 2002, Frogger's Adventures 2: The Lost Wand in 2002, and Frogger's Journey: The Forgotten Relic in 2003. There were two mobile games in this time, Frogger in 2003, and Frogger Puzzle in 2005.

The seventh generation of video game consoles saw the release of Frogger on the Xbox 360 in 2006, Frogger 2 for the Xbox 360 in 2008, Frogger Returns in 2009, and Frogger: Hyper Arcade Edition for the Wii, PlayStation 3, Xbox 360, iOS, and Android in 2012. That generation of handhelds saw Frogger: Helmet Chaos in 2005 and My Frogger Toy Trials in 2006. The J2ME platform saw Frogger Evolution in 2006 and Frogger Beats 'n' Bounces in 2008. In 2007, Frogger Launch was released for Windows Mobile and Frogger Hop Trivia was released as an arcade game.

Starting in the 2010s, the majority of Frogger games were released for handheld or mobile devices. These included Frogger Inferno for the iOS in 2010, Frogger for mobile devices in 2010, Frogger 3D for the Nintendo 3DS in 2011, Frogger Decades for iOS in 2011, Frogger in Toy Town for Apple Arcade in 2019, and Frogger and the Rumbling Ruins for Apple Arcade in 2022. Frogger Pinball was released as a web game in 2011, Frogger's Crackout was released for the Windows Store in 2013, Frogger: Get Hoppin was a casino game released in 2017, and a new version of Frogger is being planned for the Intellivision Amico.

== Other media ==
In 1981, a Frogger board game and jigsaw puzzle were made.

Sega developed an arcade video game titled Ribbit in 1991 with a similar premise to Frogger, having released the original game outside Japan; Konami sued Sega and prevented them from releasing the game, with only one board having survived and made its way to the Galloping Ghost Arcade.

In 2020, in preparation for the 40th anniversary of the series, Konami Cross Media announced a Frogger-themed card series and board game. In 2021, NBCUniversal created a Frogger game show TV series for the Peacock streaming service, named as such.
