= Frogger: Ancient Shadow =

2005 video game

- North American GameCube box art
- Developer: Hudson Soft
- Publisher: Konami Digital Entertainment America
- Director: Koji Matsuura
- Designer: Hidenori Oikawa
- Composer: Hironobu Yahata
- Series: Frogger
- Engine: RenderWare
- Platforms: GameCube, PlayStation 2, Xbox, Windows (Note: The Windows version of the game was distributed as a USB plug-and-play controller, unplayable after 2012. There is currently an effort led by Highway Frogs to recover/restore the game.)
- Release: NA: September 27, 2005
- Genre: Platform
- Modes: Single-player, multiplayer

Frogger: Ancient Shadow is a 2005 platform video game developed by Hudson Soft and published by Konami for GameCube, PlayStation 2, Xbox and Windows. It is a sequel to 2003's Frogger's Adventures: The Rescue, and is part of the Frogger series.

== Plot ==
One sunny morning, Frogger was taking a nap and was woken up by his friend Lily. Lily tells Frogger that something is going on in Firefly Swamp. The insects are frightened, and Lily saw a suspicious shadow lurking in the forest. Lily says she will be fine as long as there are not any last minute script changes.

After the first boss, Lumpy comes and finds Frogger at his fishing spot. When Lumpy is determined to catch the "Big One" and "have a big filet tonight", Frogger confesses "that he had caught the Big One". Frogger then tells Lumpy that weird things have been happening lately around Firefly Swamp, like the insects have been acting strange lately.

As Frogger meets the Little Lion in White Savanna Level 2, a scary monster came and stole the Amulet of Mastery, then Mr. Lion began acting strange and climbed the cliff and took off. The monster also used the Amulet of Mastery to make Mr. Lion and the other fairies act strange. Frogger decides to save Mr. Lion.

At White Savanna Level 3, Frogger sees a monster with a suit and a hood. He threatens to shoot an arrow at Frogger but he shoots a fairy instead. Luckily, Frogger was not hurt. The monster jumps off.

After defeating Mr. Lion, Frogger spots Finnius. Little Lion reunites with Mr. Lion. His family has guarded the Amulet of Mastery since ancient times, but it's been taken by an unknown person. Finnius admits he is responsible for the ancient documents to help save the Amulet. Frogger has gotten mixed up in some trouble once more.

Meanwhile, in Hidden Caves, Frogger confronts the monster again. He shoots an arrow but Frogger avoids it at first. After he shoots an arrow at Frogger, he explains that the place is not a place for kids. Frogger should leave if he wants to be safe, however, the monster leaves. Frogger infiltrates the mini-game called "Firefly Surfing" unharmed.

At the boss, Frogger meets the stranger along with Dr. Wani and his minions in TRIP. He noted that he has the Amulet of Mastery. Dr. Wani has no choice but to leave while the stranger shoots the Wani minions. He then takes off. Frogger is forced to defeat the minions in combat. After that, they swim away and Frogger catches up with Dr. Wani, stating that his strategy is as laughable as a one-legged squirrel.

== Windows version ==
Unlike the earlier releases in the series, Frogger: Ancient Shadow released on Windows as a plug-and-play USB game controller.

This controller was based on Net Jet technology, and when it was plugged in it would download the installer from remote servers managed by Oberon Media. The installer would then install the game executable, without any of the game assets. Game assets were downloaded during loading screens for the area about to be loaded. This was presumably done so the amount of time it took to set up the game was near-zero, making it a truly plug-and-play experience. However, since the servers hosting these files went offline sometime after July 2012, the game has been rendered unplayable and the assets lost. There is an effort currently spearheaded by Highway Frogs to restore the game into a playable state.

== Reception ==
Reception

Aggregate score
Aggregator	Score		
Aggregator	GameCube	PS2	Xbox
Metacritic	54/100	54/100	47/100

Review scores
Publication	Score		
Publication	GameCube	PS2	Xbox
GameSpot	5/10	5/10	5/10
GameSpy	2/5	N/A	2/5
GameZone	N/A	5/10	N/A
IGN	5.3/10	5.3/10	5.3/10
Nintendo Power	5.5/10	N/A	N/A
Official U.S. PlayStation Magazine	N/A	2.5/5	N/A
Official Xbox Magazine (US)	N/A	N/A	2.5/10
PlayStation: The Official Magazine	N/A	6.5/10	N/A
TeamXbox	N/A	N/A	6/10
X-Play	2/5	2/5	2/5

The GameCube and PlayStation 2 versions received "mixed" reviews, while the Xbox version received "generally unfavorable reviews", according to the review aggregation website Metacritic.
