= My Frogger Toy Trials =

2006 video game

- North American box art
- Developer: Konami Computer Entertainment Hawaii
- Publisher: Konami
- Composer: Stephen Geering
- Series: Frogger
- Platform: Nintendo DS
- Release: NA: November 7, 2006; EU: February 23, 2007; AU: March 2, 2007
- Genre: Action
- Modes: Single player, Multiplayer

My Frogger Toy Trials is an action video game developed by Konami Computer Entertainment Hawaii and published by Konami for the Nintendo DS handheld video game console. It was first released in North America on November 7, 2006, in Europe on February 23, 2007, and in Australia on March 2, 2007.

== Gameplay ==
My Frogger Toy Trials has three types of gameplay. The first is the hub, where the player moves the protagonist (named Kyle by default) around various areas to participate in levels and mini-games. The next is the main game, where the player controls Frogger instead. In it, Frogger is put on a level covered in a grid, which Frogger must get through. The final gameplay type are all of the various mini-games. Some mini-games can be played in the hub area, while all of them are playable in the Mini-game and Multiplayer modes.

== Plot ==
My Frogger Toy Trials begins with a young boy named Kyle, who is watching an advertisement for Toy Pets (a toy meant to be used in a tournament consisting of several worlds with several levels each) anticipating the arrival of his. Eventually, he meets a cloaked man named Shadow, who delivers his Toy Pet egg to him.

One month later, on the day of the tournament, Kyle is disappointed that after all that time, his egg still hasn't hatched yet. He meets up with his friend Lucy, who is also participating in the tournament. After talking with his mother and Lucy, Kyle and Lucy leave for the tournament. On their way, Kyle discusses with Lucy that he hopes that his Toy Pet turns out to be a dragon. Soon after arriving, Kyle's egg begins to hatch. However, instead of the dragon he asked for, from the egg emerges a frog. Kyle seems to hate him at the start, because of his lack of abilities, to the point of Kyle insulting the frog, nicknamed "Froggy" by Lucy. Disheartened, Froggy jumps into the sewer, but is saved by a Toy Pet frog named Lumpy, who is owned by the mysterious "Agent T". Afterwards Kyle names him Frogger and the two agree to work together from here on out.

== Audio ==
My Frogger Toy Trials' soundtrack was composed by Stephen Geering, with the exception of the Frogger Theme Music, which was composed by Mutato Muzika.

== Reception ==
Reception

Aggregate score
Aggregator	Score
Metacritic	66/100

Review scores
Publication	Score
Gamekult	6/10
GameZone	7.8/10
IGN	7.5/10
Jeuxvideo.com	13/20
NGamer	45%

The game received "average" reviews according to the review aggregation website Metacritic.

== See also ==
- Frogger
- List of Nintendo DS games
