= Mutant Storm Reloaded =

2005 video game

Mutant Storm: Reloaded
- Developer: PomPom Games
- Publisher: Microsoft
- Designers: Miles Visman & Michael Michael
- Engine: Tripper 3D Engine
- Platforms: Xbox 360 (XBLA), Windows
- Release: Xbox 360; November 22, 2005; Microsoft Windows; March 21, 2012; RUS: March 27, 2009
- Genre: Multi-directional shooter
- Modes: Single player, multiplayer

Mutant Storm: Reloaded is a multi-directional shoot 'em up developed by PomPom Games. The game debuted as a launch title on the Xbox 360's Xbox Live Arcade service with updated graphics, sound, and gameplay over its Windows and Xbox predecessor, Mutant Storm (later was released for Microsoft Windows).

The game's core is very much that of a classic arcade shooter, although its artistic design, colorful and reminiscent of cel-shading or microscopic medical imaging, has been called "psychedelic" and "an eye-frying Minter-esque slice of psychotropic twitch brilliance" by reviewers. Generally, reviews were positive, with the most common complaint being the game's high launch price, 800 Microsoft Points ($10 USD), compared to similar alternatives available on Xbox Live Arcade.

== Gameplay ==
In the game, the player controls a ship around a succession of 89 rooms filled with enemies which must be defeated within a certain time period. The enemies range from slow-moving targets to stationary turrets to mini-boss-type enemies which require many shots and specific strategies to be defeated. After each room is cleared, the remaining time is converted to points and added to the score. As the player progresses without losing a life, a score multiplier and a belt meter increase the reward and difficulty level. Gameplay strategies, weapons and power-ups depend on the mode of gameplay chosen.

=== Score multiplier ===
Scores are increased by 2x, 3x, or 4x the longer a player goes without losing a life. The highest scores are awarded to consistently great performances, as mistakes can slow down a scoring drive considerably.

=== Belt meter ===
The belt meter is the second gameplay element that alters the level of challenge during the game. It is a performance-ranking system that uses a color scale similar to the one used in judo, although the game creators referred to it as Blastikkidoo.

At the lowest level, White Belt, enemies are generally sluggish and non-threatening. At Black Belt, the game is as challenging as any of the classic twitch games. As play continues and more enemies are defeated, a belt meter in the lower left-hand corner of the screen increases gradually from 0% to 700%. Each belt color is associated with a multiple of 100%, beginning with the white belt at 0%. As the rating increases, so does the difficulty and speed of the game, as well as the scoring. If a player loses a life, their ranking is decreased, possibly causing the belt level to drop a color. In this way, the game tries to keep pace with each player's ability. In general, the player must complete 20 rooms without dying to be able to move onto the next color.

=== Modes ===
There are two play modes available. The first, Adventure Mode, is a progression through the 89 rooms. Players can keep retrying a room after losing a life, and after they complete one room proceed to the next one. After every 10 rooms, a checkpoint is created; a new game can then be started on that room thereafter. In addition to choosing a room, Adventure Mode allows the player to start a game at any belt level that has been previously unlocked. Adventure Mode rewards steady, consistent performance without any deaths.

The second mode, Tally Mode, is played one room at a time. Players are competing against themselves by trying to best their top score in that room. Tally Mode is different from Adventure Mode in that each room is a checkpoint: once that room is completed, it can be replayed or one can go onto the next room. Tally Mode also allows players to choose any belt level, so new players can experience playing at a high belt level without having unlocked it in Adventure Mode. As only one great performance per room is needed for high scores, Tally mode rewards risk-taking and finding ways to clear rooms most efficiently.

=== Weapons and powerups ===
The arsenal available to the player depends on the mode of gameplay. In Adventure Mode, the ship is equipped with a default laser fire which can be upgraded through temporary power-ups (for example, a stronger laser or seeking missiles). Other power-ups give the ship a shield to withstand an extra attack or add to the score. At the start of each game, the player is given three bombs which clear the area around the ship of enemies. In Tally Mode, the only weapon available is the default laser cannon.

=== Multiplayer and Xbox Live gameplay ===
The game also has a two-player cooperative mode played locally on the same Xbox 360, which is available on both Adventure and Tally modes. The game maintains its difficulty in cooperative mode by decreasing the number of extra lives per player and limiting the range of the basic laser weapon. High scores for Adventure Mode and Tally Mode, both in single-player and two-player, are posted on leaderboards on Xbox Live.

== Reception ==
Reception

Aggregate score
Aggregator	Score
Metacritic	77/100

Review scores
Publication	Score
Eurogamer	8/10
GameSpot	7/10
GamesRadar+	4.5/5 stars
IGN	7.5/10
TeamXbox	8.2/10

Mutant Storm Reloaded received mixed to positive reviews from critics upon release. On Metacritic, the Xbox 360 version of the game holds a score of 77/100 based on 18 reviews.

== Sequel ==
A sequel, Mutant Storm Empire, was released on October 31, 2007.
