= Frogger Advance: The Great Quest =

2002 video game

- Developer: Vicarious Visions
- Publisher: Konami
- Designer: Christopher Degnan
- Composers: Manfred Linzner; Todd Masten
- Series: Frogger (series)
- Platform: Game Boy Advance
- Release: NA: May 28, 2002; EU: September 27, 2002
- Genre: Platform
- Mode: Single-player

Frogger Advance: The Great Quest is a platform game developed by Vicarious Visions and published by Konami for the Game Boy Advance. It was released in North America on May 28, 2002. The game was previously released for the PlayStation 2 under the title Frogger: The Great Quest.

== Story ==
The opening slideshow shows the titular character, Frogger, listening in on a conversation between two young boys fishing by a lake. They discuss the classic fairy tale staple of a princess' kiss having the magical property of turning a plain frog into a handsome prince. Upon hearing this, Frogger decides to seek out a princess willing to kiss him. Subsequently, the progression of this quest is presented in the form of slideshows played in between certain stages. They show Frogger's encounters with a variety of characters, who provide him with advice, or ask him to solve certain tasks.

== Gameplay ==
Frogger Advance features traditional 2D side-scrolling platforming mechanics rather than the top-down gameplay of the original Frogger arcade game. The player's primary objective is simply to reach the end of each stage, overcoming the obstacles and enemies in their path by means of jumping, or attacking. This is made easier by Frogger's special abilities, which he is granted at predetermined points throughout the game by a recurring frog fairy character. These abilities include the Super Tongue (a more powerful close range attack), Glide, Double Jump, and an underwater forward thrust.

The game is divided into several different worlds, all of which consist of three regular stages and one special stage featuring a boss character, or a special task, which has to be completed within a time limit. Upon completion of each of these worlds, the player's performance is graded in a range from A+ to F− according to how many coins were collected, how many hidden gems were found and how many lives were lost. If the player manages to complete the entire game with A+ grades in all worlds, a special, more conclusive ending slideshow is played.

== Reception ==
Frogger Advance received mixed reviews from critics. IGN's Craig Harris criticized the game's generic gameplay, but noted that the controls were well designed. GameSpot's Tim Tracy called the game "a solid choice" for a young gamer. Scott Alan Marriott of AllGame rated it two stars out of five.
