= Frogger Beyond =

2002 video game

- North American Gamecube box art
- Developers: Konami Computer Entertainment Hawaii; Konami Software Shanghai
- Publisher: Konami
- Producers: Will Shen; Shosen Cho; Jeff Greenhut; Robert Parnell
- Programmers: Bin Wang; Jiong Chen
- Composers: Jun Funahashi; Koichi Ohata
- Series: Frogger
- Engine: RenderWare
- Platforms: GameCube, Xbox, Windows, PlayStation 2
- Release: December 10, 2002: GameCube; NA: December 10, 2002; JP: June 5, 2003; PAL: June 27, 2003 Xbox; NA: December 10, 2002 Windows; NA: March 24, 2003 PlayStation 2; JP: June 26, 2003; PAL: June 27, 2003
- Genre: Platform
- Mode: Single-player

Frogger Beyond (Note: Known in Japan as Frogger (Japanese language: フロッガー, Hepburn romanization: Furoggā)) is a 2002 platform game developed and published by Konami for the GameCube, Xbox, Windows and PlayStation 2. It follows Frogger, a young anthropomorphic frog, as he goes through a coming of age ritual to become a teenager. Like previous Frogger titles, the gameplay is based around twitch-based tile platforming viewed from an overhead perspective; however, it also incorporates on-rails sections that require the player to dodge obstacles while constantly moving forward. Frogger can utilize an array of abilities as well as power-ups when traversing stages to find items and further progression.

The game received mixed reception from critics.

== Gameplay ==
Alongside the twitch-based tile platforming found in prior Frogger titles (left), the game has occasional on rails sections that require the player to dodge obstacles while constantly moving forward (right).

Frogger Beyond is a platform game played from an overhead perspective. The plot follows Frogger, a young anthropomorphic frog, who must go through a coming of age ritual in order to become a teenager. Over the course of the game, Frogger traverses 31 levels spread across nine worlds. Like its predecessors, the game is based around twitch-based tile-hopping from platform to platform in order to reach a goal, dodging any enemies and obstacles along the way. This is occasionally broken up by either a boss fight or an on-rails section, which sees Frogger moving forward automatically in a vehicle, such as a minecart or snowboard, as they attempt to dodge obstacles in their way.

Frogger has a variety of abilities at his disposal. He can use his tongue or high jump to collect coins and can long jump to hop over gaps and enemies respectively. Coins can be used to buy power-ups which allow Frogger to temporarily eat enemies, move faster or become invincible depending on the one used. Frogger starts the game with three lives and if he is hit by an enemy or obstacle he loses one life. When Frogger loses all his lives the game is over and the player must restart the level they were on from the beginning. Extra lives can be obtained by licking up bugs found throughout levels.

== Reception ==
Reception

Aggregate scores
Aggregator	Score			
Aggregator	GameCube	PC	PS2	Xbox
GameRankings	60%	43%	42%	55%
Metacritic	60/100	N/A	59/100	51/100

Review scores
Publication	Score			
Publication	GameCube	PC	PS2	Xbox
Famitsu	25/40	N/A	N/A	N/A
GamesMaster	59%	N/A	34%	N/A
GameSpot	6.2/10	N/A	N/A	N/A
GameSpy	N/A	N/A	N/A	2/5
IGN	5.8/10	5.5/10	N/A	5.8/10
Nintendo Power	3.1/5	N/A	N/A	N/A
PlayStation Official Magazine – UK	N/A	N/A	4/10	N/A
Play	N/A	N/A	59%	N/A
PSM3	N/A	N/A	35%	N/A
X-Play	3/5	N/A	N/A	N/A

Frogger Beyond received mixed reviews according to the review aggregation website Metacritic. In Japan, Famitsu gave the GameCube version a score of one seven, one six, one seven, and one five for a total of 25 out of 40.

In the March 2007 issue of Electronic Gaming Monthly, Seanbaby listed the game as one of the Official Worst-Selling Games of 2006.
