= Frogger: The Great Quest =

2001 video game

- North American Windows box art
- Developer: Konami of America Papa Yeti Studio
- Publisher: Konami
- Director: Jeffrey Buchanan
- Producer: Jeffrey Buchanan
- Programmers: Manny De La Torriente; Lee Ozer; Steve Schuleter
- Artists: Rick Fox; Rutherford Gong
- Composer: Steve McClure
- Series: Frogger
- Platforms: PlayStation 2, Windows
- Release: PlayStation 2: NA: November 19, 2001; PAL: May 24, 2002; Windows: NA: September 14, 2002
- Genre: Platform
- Mode: Single-player

Frogger: The Great Quest is a 2001 platform game developed by Papa Yeti Studio and published by Konami. It is part of the Frogger series, and was initially released for the PlayStation 2 in 2001, before being ported to Microsoft Windows the following year. It was also released for the Game Boy Advance with the title Frogger Advance: The Great Quest.

== Gameplay ==
A screen capture of Frogger's first appearance in the PC version of the game, with a collectable coin

Frogger: The Great Quest is a platform game aimed at a young audience. The objective is to lead Frogger across a kingdom in search of a princess. There are hints hidden in each level, on how to complete it. Bonus score can be achieved by collecting coins and gems, and there are stones that give activated abilities. There are enemies in the levels, that Frogger can kill with a melee attack or a ranged attack. Frogger can jump, and when in the air can glide by pressing the jump button again. Frogger can also swim.

== Plot ==
Frogger's quest for a princess begins when he hears about a frog that was turned into a prince by kissing a princess. First he chases after a rumour of a river princess, which turns out to be a boat. Then he finds his way to "Fairy Town" where he is given 5 tasks he must complete to be allowed to meet a fairy princess. He completes all the tasks, but she turns out not to be the right princess, so he continues his journey. After escaping the castle of an evil scientist, he continues and meets a vampire princess, who also isn't it. He fights his way through goblin territory to a castle where his princess is supposed to be. He finds the princess, whose name is Joy, in captivity of the "magical general of light and industry", the source of all evil in the kingdom. After defeating him, the princess kisses him and indeed, he turns into a prince, after which they celebrate.

== Reception ==
Reception

Aggregate score
| Aggregator | Score |
|---|---|
| GameRankings | 32% |

Review scores
| Publication | Score |
|---|---|
| 4Players | 39% |
| AllGame | 1.5/5 |
| Computer Gaming World | 1.5/5 |
| Computer and Video Games | 2/10 |
| Gamekult | 3/10 |
| IGN | 3/10 |
| M! Games | 35/100 |
| Official U.S. PlayStation Magazine | 1.5/5 |
| Bravo Screenfun | 4+ |
| Game World Navigator | 3.6/10 |
| Neo Plus | 3.4/10 |
| Next Level | 2.5/10 |
| Official UK PlayStation 2 Magazine | 2/10 |
| PlayStation World | 2/10 |
| PSi2 | 2/10 |
| PSX Extreme | 4/10 |
| Xtreme PC | 20% |

Frogger: The Great Quest received generally negative reviews from critics.

The PC port does not have options to change the resolution or overall graphic quality, thus making the world appear jagged and rough. The game is notorious for its inaccurate controls and lazy camera view. The game is sometimes compared to Rayman 2: The Great Escape and Rascal in terms of graphics and overall themes.
