= Frogger: Helmet Chaos =

2005 video game

- North American DS box art
- Developer: Konami Computer Entertainment Hawaii
- Publisher: Konami
- Series: Frogger
- Platforms: Nintendo DS, PlayStation Portable
- Release: NA: September 27, 2005; EU: February 17, 2006; AU: February 24, 2006 (PSP)
- Genres: Action-adventure, platform
- Modes: Single-player, multiplayer

Frogger: Helmet Chaos is a 2005 action-adventure game developed and published by Konami for the Nintendo DS and PlayStation Portable. It is the first 3D portable Frogger title.

== Plot ==
The story starts when young Frogger is enjoying a sunny day with his friend Lumpy. Frogger then spots a moon fruit in the trees, and he goes off to retrieve it. He comes back and notices that Lumpy wandering off and he is wearing what appears to be a metal object on his head. The journey begins Frogger follows Lumpy all the way to the beach. That's when he realizes the metal object is a mind control helmet. He startles Lumpy which causes him to jump and break the helmet. Frogger then finds out that a crocodile named Dr. Wani and his assistant Ronin are behind the mind control helmets. Now it is up to Frogger to jump, swing and fight as he sets on his quest to defeat Dr. Wani before he takes over the world. The ending of the story depends on how the player chooses to end the levels.

== Gameplay ==
The gameplay is similar to the original 1981 arcade game, with some modern elements of platform games. The goal of each level is for Frogger to weave through the traffic to reach the other side. In the Nintendo DS version, the action moves from the top to the bottom, while in the PSP version players must rotate the console 90 degrees. After a number of levels, Frogger battles a boss. As a bonus, Helmet Chaos includes the original 1981 Frogger arcade game. The story has multiple endings, depending on how and where the player chooses to end the levels.

== Reception ==
Reception

Aggregate score
Aggregator	Score	
Aggregator	DS	PSP
Metacritic	69/100	66/100

Review scores
Publication	Score	
Publication	DS	PSP
Gamekult	N/A	6/10
GameSpot	7.2/10	7.3/10
GameSpy	N/A	3.5/5
GameZone	6.2/10	N/A
IGN	6.8/10	6.8/10
Jeuxvideo.com	13/20	13/20
Nintendo Power	5/10	N/A
Official U.S. PlayStation Magazine	N/A	2/5
PlayStation: The Official Magazine	N/A	6/10
X-Play	N/A	3/5

The game received "average" reviews on both platforms according to the review aggregation website Metacritic. IGN hailed the game as a "solid portable title." Frank Provo of GameSpot said that players looking for a 3D platformer with Frogger mechanics would be pleased with the game.

GameRevolution listed the game at #50 on their list of the 50 Worst Game Names Ever.
