= Frogger 3D =

2011 video game

- North American cover art
- Developer: Alpha Unit
- Publisher: Konami
- Director: Hiroshi Hanada
- Producer: Mitsuo Nagai
- Designers: Hiroshi Hanada; Kazuharu Iguchi
- Programmer: Koichi Nobori
- Artists: Fumihiro Ono; Aya Ito; Satoshi Watanabe
- Composer: Nobuo Kiyota
- Series: Frogger
- Platform: Nintendo 3DS
- Release: NA: September 20, 2011; JP: September 22, 2011; EU: November 8, 2011; AU: December 1, 2011
- Genre: Action
- Modes: Single-player, multiplayer

Frogger 3D (Note: Japanese: フロッガー3D, Hepburn: Furoggā 3D) is a 2011 action video game developed by Alpha Unit and published by Konami for the Nintendo 3DS.

== Gameplay ==
The player controls the main character by running, dashing and dodging past moving obstacles and enemies. Some of the places and environments that can be explored include the Hometown, New York, the Casino, the Military Island, the Far East, and the Pseudo Dimension. The character can jump onto and control bigger frogs, making the player able to destroy several obstacles and light up dark areas.

The game supports 4-player wireless multiplayer.

== Reception ==
Reception

Aggregate score
| Aggregator | Score |
|---|---|
| Metacritic | 54/100 |

Review scores
| Publication | Score |
|---|---|
| Destructoid | 3/10 |
| Famitsu | 30/40 |
| GamePro | 3.5/5 |
| GamesMaster | 48% |
| NGamer | 4/10 |
| Nintendo Life | 5/10 |
| Nintendo Power | 6.5/10 |
| Nintendo World Report | 6.5/10 |
| Official Nintendo Magazine | 48% |
| 411Mania | 6.5/10 |

The game received "mixed" reviews according to the review aggregation website Metacritic. In Japan, however, Famitsu gave it a score of one eight, two sevens, and one eight for a total of 30 out of 40.
