= Mutant Storm Empire =

2007 video game

Mutant Storm: Empire
- Developer(s): PomPom Games
- Publisher(s): Microsoft Game Studios
- Designer(s): Miles Visman & Michael Michael
- Engine: Tripper 3D Engine
- Platform(s): Xbox 360 (XBLA), Windows
- Release: Xbox 360 (XBLA): WW: October 31, 2007; Windows: RUS: February 27, 2009
- Genre(s): Multi-directional shooter
- Mode(s): Single player, Multiplayer

Mutant Storm: Empire is a multi-directional shoot 'em up by PomPom Games and the sequel to Mutant Storm Reloaded released for the Xbox 360's Xbox Live Arcade service and later for Microsoft Windows.

Mutant Storm Empire improves on the original Xbox 360 incarnation by creating a seamless world that lets the user travel from room to room without having to enter a loading screen. The game also features online multiplayer through Xbox Live.

== Gameplay ==
The game features 4 worlds, each divided into 4 levels playable on 5 difficulty levels or "belts" that the player can play through more or less seamlessly. There are no bombs, lives as such, if the player loses a life, one of 6 granted per world, it immediately is lost without losing energy giving a temporary repulsion to the enemies. Higher points can be reached by playing on more difficult settings and attaining combo bonuses by stringing together kills of the same enemy colour, which is made difficult as one needs to allow other enemy types to populate the screen to achieve this.

== Multiplayer ==
The game features a two-player cooperative mode that is playable locally and on Xbox Live.

== Reception ==
Reception

Aggregate score
Aggregator	Score
Metacritic	77/100

Review scores
Publication	Score
Eurogamer	7/10
GameSpot	7/10
IGN	7.7/10
TeamXbox	8.8/10

Mutant Storm Empire received mixed to positive reviews from critics upon release. On Metacritic, the game holds a score of 77/100 based on 20 reviews.
