= Frogger Decades =

2011 video game

- App icon
- Developer(s): Konami Mobile & Online, Inc.
- Publisher(s): Konami Mobile & Online, Inc.
- Series: Frogger
- Platform(s): iOS
- Release: September 1, 2011
- Genre(s): Action-adventure
- Mode(s): Single-player

Frogger Decades is a 2011 action-adventure game in the Frogger series, developed and published by Konami Mobile & Online, Inc. for iOS.

== Reception ==
Reception

Aggregate score
| Aggregator | Score |
|---|---|
| Metacritic | 69/100 |

Review scores
| Publication | Score |
|---|---|
| GamesMaster | 65% |
| Gamezebo | 80/100 |
| MacLife | 3/5 stars |
| Pocket Gamer | 3.5/5 stars |

The game received "average" reviews according to the review aggregation website Metacritic.
