= Laura Nikolich =

American video game designer and software developer

- Born: Laura Lyon; June 25, 1954
- Died: July 4, 2024 (aged 70)
- Education: University of South Florida (BA)
- Occupations: Software developer Video game designer
- Notable work: Spider-Man (Atari 2600)

Laura Nikolich (née Lyon; 25 June 1954 – 4 July 2024) was an American video game designer and software developer. She worked for Parker Brothers in the early 1980s where she was the sole developer for the 1982 Atari 2600 game Spider-Man and programmed the ColecoVision version of Frogger II: ThreeeDeep!.

== Education ==
Laura Nikolich graduated in 1976 with a bachelor's degree in engineering technology from University of South Florida. She learned assembly language, which she used for pager technology at Motorola. Real-time programming in assembly language gave her skills useful for the emerging video game industry.

== Career ==
Laura Nikolich was the fifth programmer hired at Parker Brothers in 1981 and the fourth hired for Atari 2600 development. Nikolich worked alone for six months on the first game based on Spider-Man. Working with the limitations of the system, she designed it as a vertically scrolling game, which was challenging to create. Spider-Man was released in 1982, promoted through television commercials, and was a success.

After Spider-Man, Nikolich developed a Care Bears game, which was never released. The game was dropped because, according to Nikolich, "marketing didn't know what they wanted". Nikolich was proudest of her work on Care Bears because of its technical challenges. Her work on manipulating the sprites made the design more lively and impressed people.

== Games ==
- Spider-Man, Atari 2600, Parker Brothers (1982)
- Frogger II: ThreeeDeep!, ColecoVision, Parker Brothers (1984)

=== Unreleased ===
- Care Bears, Atari 2600, Parker Brothers (1983)
- Orbit, ColecoVision, Parker Brothers (1983)
