= Frogger (1997 video game) =

1997 video game

- Developer: Sony Computer Entertainment Europe
- Publisher: Hasbro Interactive
- Director: Kevin Mullard
- Producers: Chris Down; Andrei Nadin
- Programmer: Tim Closs
- Artist: Marcus Broome
- Composers: Andrew Barnabas; Paul Arnold; Pete Murphy
- Series: Frogger
- Platforms: PlayStation, Windows
- Release: PlayStation; NA: 31 October 1997; EU: November 1997; Windows; NA: December 1997
- Genre: Action
- Modes: Single-player, multiplayer

Frogger, (Note: Japanese: フロッガー, Hepburn: Furoggā) informally called Frogger: He's Back!, is a 1997 action game developed by Sony Computer Entertainment Europe and published by Hasbro Interactive for the PlayStation. A port to Windows was released the same year. It is a remake and expansion of Konami's 1981 arcade game of the same name. It has large maps, 3D graphics, and new gameplay moves. Critical reaction was mixed, with frequent criticism of the gameplay, controls, and difficulty, but the graphics were received positively. It was a commercial success, becoming one of the best-selling PlayStation games.

In 2000, its gameplay elements were expanded in the sequel Frogger 2: Swampy's Revenge.

== Gameplay ==
Like the original game, the objective is to explore the map for five small colored frogs: green, orange, purple, blue and red. However, unlike the original game the maps are more complex, rather than recycling the same basic layout each time. Each frog must be collected within a certain amount of time or the player will lose a life, and on top of this, there are various obstacles, traps and enemies which must be avoided and usually are unique to a certain zone. Hazards range from animals like bees, snakes, tarantulas and dogs to vehicles like cars and lawn mowers to level hazards like water, cacti and lava. There is also a gold frog hidden in one level in each zone; the player will unlock a new zone for each gold frog that is found. Finding every gold frog in the game will unlock an alternate ending sequence. There are a total of 33 levels spread out through nine different zones, with the first zone including five levels (and a multiplayer level) based on the original arcade version of the game.

The player begins with five lives (three on the PlayStation version). Should a player lose a life, they return to the starting point of the level. Frogger's new abilities include being able to eat flies of various types, croak, and jump upwards onto ledges to take advantage of the 3D perspective. Flies and croaking tend to add to the player's score, though select insects allow Frogger to speed up, lengthen his tongue, or earn an extra life.

Up to four players can play simultaneously in a race to complete each level. Frogger has 38 total levels, with 33 of those being single-player levels.

== Reception ==
=== Sales ===
The game was a commercial success. By early 1998, it had sold nearly 1 million units in North America. Worldwide, the game sold 4 million units by May 2000. The PlayStation version sold 3.37 million units in North America, resulting in the game being one of the best-selling PlayStation titles of all time and subsequently seeing a re-release on the Sony's Greatest Hits lineup. The PC version was also successful, selling almost one million copies within less than four months.

Following the game's launch, an episode of the NBC sitcom Seinfeld was produced titled "The Frogger", based on the original arcade game. Hasbro greatly increased production of the 1997 Frogger game to coincide with the Seinfeld episode's original air date; supplying large amounts of Frogger copies to all major American retailers.

As of 2001, Frogger has sold 6 million units worldwide. In the United States, Frogger's jewel case version for computers sold 510,000 copies and earned $4.3 million by August 2006, after its release in October 2000. It was the country's 27th best-selling computer game between January 2000 and August 2006. The success of Frogger was a key factor in Hasbro Interactive acquiring the remaining assets of Atari from JT Storage.

=== Critical reception ===
Reception

Aggregate score
Aggregator	Score
GameRankings	60% (PC); 50% (PS1)

Review scores
Publication	Score
Computer Gaming World	3.5/5
Electronic Gaming Monthly	6.4/10 (PS1)
GameRevolution	C+
GameSpot	6.7/10 (PS1); 5/10 (PC)
IGN	2/10 (PS1)
Next Generation	1/5 (PS1)
Official U.S. PlayStation Magazine	2.5/5 (PS1)
PlayStation: The Official Magazine	1/5 (PS1)
Computer Games Strategy Plus	4/5

Frogger received mixed to negative reviews from critics, with a GameRankings score of 60.38% for the PC version and a 49.82% for the PlayStation version.

Criticism of the game was primarily targeted towards the game's design, which reviewers felt followed the original arcade game too closely. Stephen Poole of GameSpot argued that Hasbro retained too many old video game conventions in his review of the PC version. The game's tendency to bring the player back to the starting point of the level once a frog is collected (as in the original) Poole complained "turned challenges into frustrations" as players must repeatedly complete the same difficult sections, and ultimately concluded that "the 'new and improved' Frogger probably won't convert anyone who didn't care for the old one." A reviewer for Game Revolution agreed, arguing the time limits make it impossible to play a level for a lengthy amount of time before dying, reducing the challenge to a matter of practice and memorization. The reviewer likewise concluded that Frogger would not appeal to new players, though the game "should sell very well to the numerous fans of the old coin-op." Kelly Rickards of Electronic Gaming Monthly (EGM) likewise found that the new levels, which seem to invite exploration, are made frustrating and excessively difficult by the time limits. He still enjoyed the game, but said he wished it had more of the Retro Stages instead. In an illustration of reviewers' divisive response to the game, EGM's four reviewers gave individual scores ranging from 4/10 (from Kraig Kujawa, who found the camera too zoomed-in to figure out where to go) to 8/10 (from Shawn Smith, who praised the lighting effects and the Retro Stages).

Adam Douglas of IGN blasted the camera, controls, and "impossibly high level of difficulty", claiming they result in "an unplayable game" and "one of the worst PlayStation games yet seen." Conversely, GameSpot reviewer Joe Fielder called Frogger "an enjoyable title" in his review of the PlayStation version. He spoke highly of the Retro Stages, claiming they were "almost worth the price of the game." Fielder acknowledged the divisive response to the game, saying the difficulty in the later stages and multiplayer levels would alienate players, and recommended first completing all the Retro Stages in order to get a feel for the game's timing. GamePro commented that the reduced field of vision makes the multiplayer frustratingly difficult, and found that apart from the Retro Stages, the level designs are "stale, silly, and repetitious." The reviewer concluded that the gameplay was too outdated and unappealing to compete with contemporary games. Next Generation found that the poor sense of depth and lack of a map make it impossible to figure out where one can safely go except by trail and error, resulting in an "infuriating" experience.

The graphics and soundtrack received positive remarks. Fielder commented on the game's soundtrack as "extremely catchy", and described the 3D graphics as "polygonal origami." GamePro said the music evokes that of the original Frogger and "is catchy enough to be considered pleasant". GameRevolution spoke favorably about the graphics, claiming "the designers definitely deserve kudos for their work...the frogs look like frogs, alligators like alligators, and big rigs like big rigs. Frogger is truly the king of amphibian simulations". Douglas agreed, saying Frogger's "flat-shaded polygons give the game a pleasant cartoonish look." Poole however argued that "compared with what you'll find in other current releases [the graphics] are not what you'd call inspiring," and "often they don't convey a true sense of three-dimensionality". Next Generation said the game has "some of the most visually repulsive environments ever created for a videogame."
