= Frogger Returns =

2009 video game

- Developer: Hijinx Studios
- Publisher: Konami
- Series: Frogger
- Platforms: PlayStation 3, Wii, Nintendo DSi
- Release: WiiWare: NA: November 12, 2009; PAL: February 12, 2010; JP: March 24, 2010; PlayStation Network: NA: December 10, 2009; PAL: February 11, 2010; JP: April 15, 2010; DSiWare; May 17, 2010
- Genre: Action
- Modes: Single-player, multiplayer

Frogger Returns is a 2009 action game developed by Hijinx Studios and published by Konami for the PlayStation 3, Nintendo DSi, and Wii. This game is purchased from the PlayStation Store, and it was available on the Wii Shop Channel before the service ended. The game was also released as DSiWare on May 18, 2010.

== Gameplay ==
The game has four levels: Big City, Subway, Sewers, and Swamp. By collecting power-ups, the player gains the ability to stop and reverse time and make themselves invincible for a short period, among other effects. In the Wii and PlayStation versions, there is a multi-player mode with many different mini-games.

== Development ==
On October 27, 2009, Konami announced Frogger Returns was to be released on WiiWare and PlayStation Network. A DSiWare version was announced in 2010.

== Reception ==
Reception

Aggregate score
Aggregator	Score		
Aggregator	DS	PS3	Wii
Metacritic	60/100	44/100	47/100

Review scores
Publication	Score		
Publication	DS	PS3	Wii
IGN	N/A	4.6/10	4.6/10
Nintendo Life	6/10	N/A	7/10
Official Nintendo Magazine	N/A	N/A	57%
Play	N/A	35%	N/A

The DSi version received "mixed" reviews, while the PlayStation 3 and Wii versions received "generally unfavorable reviews", according to the review aggregation website Metacritic. IGN said the Wii version was "ugly, it forces the player to use a batcrap crazy control scheme, a bad camera angle results in cheap deaths, and it can't go online."
