= Frogger's Journey: The Forgotten Relic =

2003 video game

- North American box art
- Developer: Konami Computer Entertainment Hawaii
- Publisher: Konami
- Series: Frogger
- Platform: Game Boy Advance
- Release: NA: October 28, 2003; JP: June 17, 2004
- Genre: Action-adventure
- Mode: Single-player

Frogger's Journey: The Forgotten Relic (Note: Known in Japan as Frogger: Mysteries of Ancient Civilizations (Japanese: フロッガー 古代文明のなぞ, Hepburn: Furoggā: Kodaibunmei no Nazo)) is a 2003 action-adventure game developed and published by Konami for the Game Boy Advance. It follows Frogger, an anthropomorphic frog who attempts to find his missing grandfather. The gameplay is similar to that of previous Frogger titles, as players control Frogger through a series of top-down levels with the objective to reach a goal at the end. Levels are broken up by sections in a hub world where the player must explore, talk to NPCs and find items in order to progress to the next level.

== Gameplay ==
Frogger's Journey is an action-adventure game with platforming mechanics similar to previous Frogger titles. The player controls Frogger, an anthropomorphic frog, in an overhead perspective. Like earlier installments, the player moves by hopping from tile to tile and utilizes different abilities for progression.

The game includes eighteen levels to complete that become more complex as players advance through them. Unlike previous games, where getting hit once meant players lost a life, Frogger has a health bar.

== Reception ==
The Forgotten Relic received both good and bad reviews leading to a mediocre score according to the review aggregation website Metacritic.

Reception

Aggregate score
Aggregator	Score
Metacritic	59/100 (6 reviews)
