= Frogging =

Frogging may refer to:

- The use of braided frog fasteners
- Searching for frogs
- Performing a planche stand
- Ripping out knitting
- Splooting, lying prone and spread-eagled like a frog

== See also ==
- Fragging, deliberate killing or attempted killing by a soldier of a fellow soldier
- Frogger (disambiguation)
- Frog (disambiguation)
