= Frogger's Adventures 2: The Lost Wand =

2002 video game

- North American box art
- Developer: Konami Computer Entertainment Hawaii
- Publisher: Konami
- Programmers: Minoru Toyota; Jimi Ishihara
- Composer: Stephen Geering
- Series: Frogger
- Platform: Game Boy Advance
- Release: NA: November 5, 2002; EU: February 28, 2003; JP: June 5, 2003
- Genre: Platform
- Mode: Single-player

Frogger's Adventures 2: The Lost Wand (Note: Japanese: フロッガー 魔法の国の大冒険, Hepburn: Furoggā: Mahō no Kuni no Daibōken) is a 2002 action game developed and published by Konami for the Game Boy Advance. It is the sequel to 2001's Frogger's Adventures: Temple of the Frog, and follows Frogger as he attempts to find the scattered pieces of a magic wand.

== Gameplay ==
Frogger licking a tile to make it move towards him. An assortment of other new stage mechanics are present throughout the game.

The Lost Wand is an action game played from a top-down perspective. The plot follows an anthropomorphic frog named Frogger as he travels the world in search of the five scattered pieces of a magical artifact called the Eternity Wand. Like its predecessors, the game is based around twitch-based tile-hopping from platform to platform in order to reach a goal in a series of levels, avoiding any obstacles and enemies along the way. Over the course of the game, Frogger traverses 15 levels spread across five worlds.

== Reception ==
The Lost Wand received mixed reception from critics.

Reception

Review scores
Publication	Score
IGN	8/10
Jeuxvideo.com	13/20
