= Gakken Compact Vision TV Boy =

Home video game console by Gakken

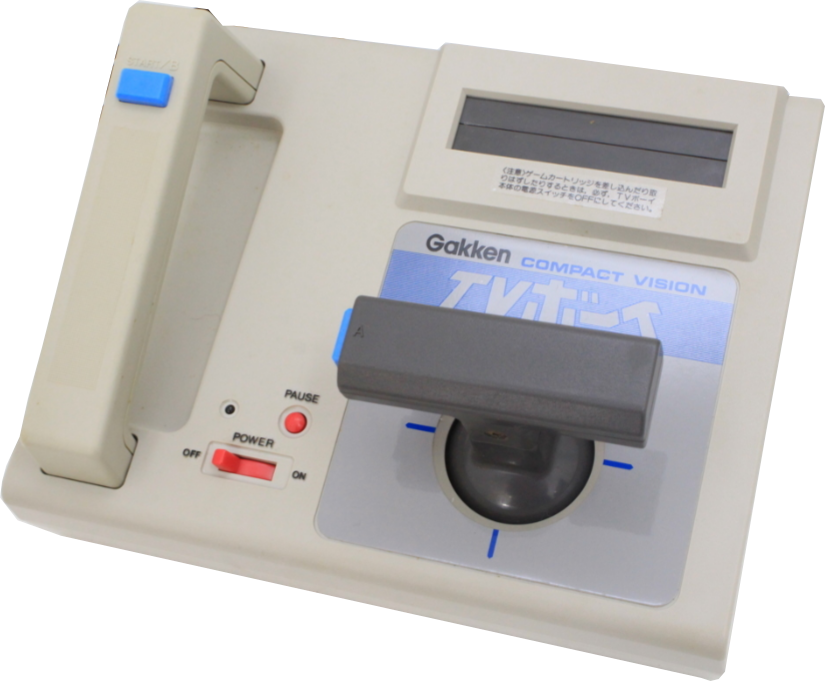
- A Gakken Compact Vision TV Boy
- Developer: Gakken
- Type: Home video game console
- Generation: Second generation
- Released: JP: October 1983
- Introductory price: ¥8,800
- Media: ROM cartridge
- CPU: Motorola MC6801
- Memory: 2k RAM
- Display: 128 × 192 pixels, 9 colors (only 4 can be shown at the same time)
- Graphics: Motorola 6847

The Gakken Compact Vision TV Boy (Japanese: TV ボーイ, Hepburn: TV bōi) is a second generation home video game console developed by Gakken and released in Japan in 1983 for a price of ¥8,800.

The system was made to compete with the Epoch Cassette Vision, which had a market dominance of 70% in Japan.

The console was released months after the Nintendo Famicom and Sega SG-1000 which, although more expensive at ¥15,000, were more advanced and had more features as well as bigger games libraries; furthermore, Epoch had just launched the Cassette Vision Jr. revision for ¥5,000. These factors made the system obsolete from the start, with a high price tag, few and comparably rudimentary games, and a strange form factor, leading to poor sales. As a result, it is now a rare collector's item among some retro gamers.

In January 2024, the Gakken Compact Vision TV Boy game console hardware and six games were ROM dumped, scanned and preserved. This console could only be played on the MAME emulator.

== Technical specifications ==
- CPU (cartridge): Motorola MC6801 (8-bit) clocked at 4 MHz
- RAM: 2 Kb
- Internal graphics: Motorola MC6847: 128 × 192 pixel; 9 colors (only four at the same time: white, orange, green and magenta or yellow, green, red and blue)

== Games ==
There were only six games officially released for the system, each being sold for ¥3,800, and designed for a single player.

- Excite Invader
- Mr. Bomb
- Robotan Wars
- Chitaikū Daisakusen (Japanese: 地対空大作戦; 'The grand operation of surface-to-air') - a port of Super Cobra
- Frogger
- Shigaisen 200X-nen (Japanese: 市街戦200X年, Hepburn: shigaisen nisen-ekkusu-nen; 'Urban warfare year 200X')
