= Frogger's Adventures: The Rescue =

2003 video game

- North American GameCube box art
- Developer: Hudson Soft
- Publisher: Konami
- Director: Koji Matsuura
- Producer: Mitch Ueno
- Designer: Hidenori Oikawa
- Composer: Ichiro Shimakura
- Series: Frogger
- Engine: RenderWare
- Platforms: GameCube, PlayStation 2, Windows
- Release: GameCube: NA: October 28, 2003; PlayStation 2: NA: October 28, 2003; JP: June 17, 2004; Windows: NA: December 2003
- Genre: Action-adventure
- Modes: Single-player, multiplayer

Frogger's Adventures: The Rescue is a 2003 action-adventure video game developed by Hudson Soft and published by Konami for the GameCube, PlayStation 2, and Windows. It is based on the original 1981 Frogger arcade game, and contains similar hop-and-dodge style gameplay.

== Story ==
A young frog named Frogger is relaxing inside his home in Firefly Swamp when a spaceship crashes in his yard, injuring his friend and guardian Lumpy. The driver of the ship turns out to be Beauty Frog of F.I.R.S.T. (Frog International Rescue Support Team). Frogger becomes a member of F.I.R.S.T. and goes on missions to exotic locations to rescue many of Beauty Frog's friends, including Doctor Frog, who is needed to heal Lumpy. Finally he rescues his girlfriend Lily, who has been kidnapped by T.R.I.P. (Tyrannical Reptiles in Power).

== Gameplay ==
The game contains hop-and-dodge style gameplay similar to that of the original arcade game. Frogger, however, can perform many moves that he could not in the original. Frogger can perform a "super hop" which allows him to jump over the space in front of him, as well as being able to move footholds and sections of certain walls with his tongue. Frogger can also rotate left and right.

=== Story mode ===
Story mode is the main mode of play, and is for one player only. The player takes control of Frogger and helps him explore challenging levels.

=== Multiplayer mode ===
Multiplayer mode contains nine mini-games that can be played with up to four players. Initially, only one game is available, but a new one becomes unlocked when Frogger completes the training level, and each time he completes all the levels in a world. In multiplayer mode players are allowed to play as Frogger, Lumpy, and Beauty Frog, along with other F.I.R.S.T. agents Ranger Frog and Ninja Frog.

== Reception ==
Reception

Aggregate score
| Aggregator | Score | |
| Aggregator | GameCube | PS2 |
|---|---|---|
| Metacritic | 61/100 | 59/100 |

Review scores
| Publication | Score | |
| Publication | GameCube | PS2 |
|---|---|---|
| Famitsu | N/A | 30/40 |
| GameSpot | 6.3/10 | 6.3/10 |
| GameZone | N/A | 6.8/10 |
| IGN | 5.5/10 | 5.5/10 |
| Official U.S. PlayStation Magazine | N/A | 2/5 |
| Play | N/A | B− |
| X-Play | N/A | 2/5 |

The GameCube and PlayStation 2 versions received "mixed" reviews according to the review aggregation website Metacritic. In Japan, where the game was ported for release under the name Frogger Rescue (フロッガー レスキュー, Furoggā Resukyū) on June 17, 2004, Famitsu gave it a better score of 30 out of 40.

GameSpot said that although the game doesn't try anything new, it's still a solid game. Mary Jane Irwin of IGN said the game wasn't bad but it wasn't good either. Irwin criticized the lack of challenge when it came to puzzles and the poor controls. Play UK gave the PS2 version a positive rating noting the levels as being clever, the boss fights being creative and stating "a substantially entertaining game that maintains the classic sensibilities of the original, building upon them, expanding the concept, evolving it into an inspired yet uncomplicated action-puzzler."

The game sold around half a million units across its three platforms.
