= Frogger 2: Swampy's Revenge =

2000 video game

- North American PlayStation box art
- Developers: Blitz Games; Game Titan (GBC)
- Publisher: Hasbro Interactive
- Directors: Darren Wood; David Lubar (GBC)
- Producers: Andrew & Philip Oliver (Team Spirit); David Walls (GBC)
- Designers: Alex Rigby; Joff Scarcliffe; David Lubar (GBC)
- Composers: Andy Morris; Scott Marshall (GBC)
- Series: Frogger
- Platforms: Game Boy Color, PlayStation, Windows, Dreamcast
- Release: NA: 21 September 2000; EU: 13 October 2000 (PC, PS); Dreamcast: NA: 12 October 2000
- Genre: Action
- Modes: Single-player, Multiplayer

Frogger 2: Swampy's Revenge is a 2000 action video game developed by Blitz Games and published by Hasbro Interactive for the PlayStation, Game Boy Color, Windows, and Dreamcast. The game is part of the Frogger series, and the sequel to the 1997 remake of Frogger, featuring similar 4-way movement gameplay in a 3D world and 6 different environments. Unlike its predecessor, Frogger 2 features a choice of different characters to play with in the game, several multiplayer modes, and an in-game storyline. A Nintendo 64 port of the game was planned, but was later cancelled.

== Gameplay ==
The PC and console versions of Frogger 2: Swampy's Revenge features significant changes to the gameplay that differentiates it from its predecessor. Although the gameplay objective of the Frogger series remains unchanged (the player has to collect five small frogs in order to win the game, all the while avoiding level-specific obstacles and enemies), the general gameplay has been retooled to a more traditional platformer. The level design structure has been changed to a more linear format, compared to the complex level maps from its predecessor which requires the player to actively explore and seek out the frogs. Due to the linear nature of the levels, all five frogs placed sparingly throughout each level, doubling as checkpoints for the player should they lose a life. The gameplay also lacks a time limit, though the player is graded at the results screen on how fast they completed the level.

The gameplay has also been significantly expanded from the predecessor. Players can now choose from a selection of frogs (with players alternating between Frogger and Lillie in story mode), albeit they all share the same moveset. Frogger's "super jump" from the first game (an ability that allowed him to jump to higher-placed platforms) was expanded to also allow Frogger to perform a "double jump" after using it, which can be used for clearing platforms with short gaps in front of them. Likewise, the ability of Frogger to croak was tweaked to allow players to use them as a beacon of sorts to find the small frogs-when Frogger croaks (represented by a circle that expands outwards from him), the small frogs will croak back through a similar beacon that the player can use to determine their location. Frogger also retains the ability to use the tongue to devour insects is also present, which like in the previous game can grant the player a higher score or an extra life depending on the insect consumed. Levels now include 25 coins scattered throughout each level that player can collect; with the reward for collecting them all in one level playthrough being a new game mode or an additional playable character. The game also features a multiplayer mode, which supports two players in the PlayStation version (four with a multitap) and can support up to four players in the Dreamcast and PC versions.

In contrast, the Game Boy Color version of Frogger 2: Swampy's Revenge plays a lot closer to the original arcade game, though this game also has changes as well. Instead of collecting frogs, the player merely has to reach the end of each level, avoiding obstacles along the way. Flags are marked as checkpoints for the player to respawn to should he lose a life, and gems can be collected as a means to add to the player's score. A time limit also exists, so the player has to quickly reach the end of the level before the time runs out. Twenty four levels are spread throughout five worlds (Frog Ponds, Gator Lairs, Ice Caves, Lava Pits, and Lost Mines in chronological order) for the player to complete, with Frogger and Lillie available as playable characters.

== Plot ==
Swampy, a crocodile whom Frogger jumped on in the past, gets revenge on Frogger by stealing the many baby frog siblings of his girlfriend, Lillie Frog. Frogger and Lillie pursue Swampy through various worlds rescuing the baby frogs along the way. Swampy travels to space, where he uses a satellite to broadcast a commercial for his own game, Swampy: The Game. Frogger follows in a rocket that Lillie manages to activate, and corners Swampy in a space station, where a device transports them back to Earth during Halloween. Swampy attempts to create his game in a factory under a haunted house, by using the baby frogs. Frogger and Lillie attempt to stop him, but end up trapped in a cage being lowered towards a pit full of magma. Swampy's plan goes errant after one of the baby frogs, named Tad, escapes the conveyor belt and starts playing on the controls, in the process freeing Frogger and Lillie, releasing the other baby frogs, and severely damaging the machine, quickly building up into an earthquake. After the frogs escape, the factory and mansion explode from the malfunctioning machine, and a UFO is shown leaving the wreckage as Swampy wails and the frogs watch from a hill.

== Development ==
The game was announced on 5 May 2000, in a press release.

== Reception ==
Reception

Aggregate scores
Aggregator	Score			
Aggregator	Dreamcast	GBC	PC	PS
GameRankings	75%	74%	77%	77%
Metacritic	74/100	N/A	72/100	77/100

Review scores
Publication	Score			
Publication	Dreamcast	GBC	PC	PS
AllGame	3.5/5	N/A	3.5/5	3.5/5
CNET Gamecenter	N/A	N/A	6/10	N/A
Computer Games Strategy Plus	N/A	N/A	3.5/5	N/A
Computer Gaming World	N/A	N/A	3/5	N/A
Electronic Gaming Monthly	N/A	8/10	N/A	5.33/10 (Note: Three critics of Electronic Gaming Monthly gave the PlayStation version each a score of 7/10, 4/10, and 5/10.)
Game Informer	7/10	7.5/10	N/A	N/A
GameFan	(G.H.) 68% 67% (Note: In GameFan's early viewpoint of the Dreamcast version, three critics gave it each a score of 72, 63, and 66.)	N/A	N/A	N/A
GameSpot	6.9/10	5.4/10	7.1/10	7/10
GameZone	N/A	8.5/10	9.5/10	N/A
IGN	8.2/10	8/10	8.5/10	8.5/10
Next Generation	N/A	N/A	N/A	3/5
Nintendo Power	N/A	6.9/10	N/A	N/A
Official U.S. PlayStation Magazine	N/A	N/A	N/A	3/5
PC Gamer (US)	N/A	N/A	75%	N/A

The PlayStation version received "generally favourable reviews", while the Dreamcast and PC versions received "average" reviews, according to the review aggregation website Metacritic. Jeff Lundrigan of NextGen said of the former console version, "It won't win any awards for originality, but Frogger 2 accomplishes what it sets out to do and proves enjoyable enough."

The game was a runner-up for GameSpot's annual "Best Puzzle Game" award among console games, losing to Samba de Amigo.

Frogger 2 sold nearly 1 million units by March 2001. As of May 2001, it has sold more than 2 million units for the PlayStation.
