= Frogger II: ThreeeDeep! =

1984 video game

- Atari 5200 box art
- Developer: Parker Brothers
- Publisher: Parker Brothers
- Programmers: Atari 8-bit, 5200; Larry Gelberg; 2600; Mark Lesser; ColecoVision; Laura Nikolich
- Series: Frogger
- Platforms: Atari 8-bit, Atari 5200, Atari 2600, ColecoVision, Commodore 64, Apple II, IBM PC
- Release: August 1984: Atari 8-bit, 5200 August 1984 2600 September 1984 ColecoVision, C64 October 1984 Apple II, IBM PC 1984
- Genre: Action
- Modes: Single-player, multiplayer

Frogger II on the Atari 2600

Frogger II: ThreeeDeep! (Note: Promotional materials from Parker Brothers use capital "D" in the title.) is a 1984 action video game developed and published by Parker Brothers for the Apple II, Atari 8-bit computers, Atari 2600, Atari 5200, ColecoVision, Commodore 64, and IBM PC. It is a sequel to Konami's 1981 arcade video game Frogger and has similar gameplay.

The goal of Frogger II is to maneuver each frog to a berth at the top of a screen. Once all of the berths are filled, the player progresses to the next level. Unlike its predecessor, it has three interconnected screens for each level rather than one screen per level, with berths at the top of each of the three screens that need to be filled.

== Reception ==
In a 1984 review of the Commodore 64 cartridge for Electronic Games, Louise Kohl wrote, "Fans of the original will be very pleased with its successor, and newer fans will find it appealing and challenging as well. A year ago, before the rise of computer action games with their greater emphasis on strategy, this would have been a more exciting release."

Also writing for Electronic Games, Ted Salamone was impressed that the Atari 2600 version "actually looks, plays, and sounds state of the art, all on the lowly 2600". He pointed out some flickering and difficult to distinguish objects, but still called the overall package "flawless". Computer Games gave the Atari 8-bit computer version an A rating, saying it "makes the original look like kid stuff". Computer and Video Games rated the ColecoVision version 48% in 1989.

== See also ==
- Pacific Coast Highway, 1982 Frogger-inspired game with two screens
