= Twitch gameplay =

Type of video gameplay scenario that tests a player's response time

Pong is one of the earliest commercial arcade video games relying on twitch gameplay.

Twitch gameplay is a type of video gameplay scenario that tests a player's response time. Action games such as shooters, sports, multiplayer online battle arena, and fighting games often contain elements of twitch gameplay. For example, first-person shooters such as Counter-Strike and Call of Duty require quick reaction times for the players to shoot enemies, and fighting games such as Street Fighter and Mortal Kombat require quick reaction times to attack or counter an opponent. Other video game genres may also involve twitch gameplay. For example, the puzzle video game Tetris gradually speeds up as the player makes progress.

Twitch gameplay keeps players actively engaged with quick feedback to their actions, as opposed to turn-based gaming that involves waiting for the outcome of a chosen course of action. Twitch can be used to expand tactical options and play by testing the skill of the player in various areas (usually reflexive responses) and generally add difficulty (relating to the intensity of "twitching" required).

Fast chess, chess played with short time limits between moves, is an example of adding a twitch gameplay element to a turn-based game. Conversely, checkpoints and extra lives are common game mechanics in twitch gaming that attempt to reduce the penalty for errors in play, adding an element of turn-based gameplay. Traditionally, however, the term "twitch game" has been applied to simple arcade, console, and computer games that lack an element of strategy and are based solely upon a player's reaction time.

== History ==
"Twitch" refers to the motion the player makes, a sudden movement or reaction to an event on the screen. An early use of the term was by Vern Raburn of Microsoft in 1981. Many early computer, arcade, and console games are considered to be "twitch games". They mostly involved "see and react" situations. For instance, Kaboom! had players rapidly catching bombs that a mad bomber threw from a rooftop. Most classic arcade games such as Space Invaders, Pac-Man, Defender and Robotron were also twitch-based.

As games and their control inputs evolved, the games started to favor strategy over reaction, early turn-based games being the most prevalent examples. Such games required players to plan each move and anticipate the opponent's moves ahead of time. Not unlike chess, early strategy games focused on setting pieces and then moving them one turn at a time while the opponent did the same. Many of these games were based on tabletop games. The introduction of the internet, and its suitability as a playable medium, facilitated many of the features of today's mainstream games.

Some strategy games however required fast reactions within gameplay. Soon after turn-based strategy games were introduced, real-time strategy games were introduced to the video gaming market, beginning with Herzog Zwei and then Dune II and eventually leading to popular titles such as Command & Conquer, Warcraft, and StarCraft. While strategy was still the primary objective, these games played out in real time. Players were required to have fast reactions to enemies' movements and attacks.

Early first-person shooters were much like early games in general; fast reactions were required and little strategy or thought went into the gameplay. Even the youngest players were able to understand the concept, which may have been the reason such games became instantly popular among a large demographic. Many of the earliest first person games were considered cookie cutter copies of each other; Doom, Wolfenstein 3D, and many others looked, played, and felt the same, especially since many shooters were built off the Doom engine. Enemy AI was predictable and levels were simple mazes with secrets and side rooms. While some games included the ability to look up and down, it was rarely required of the player.

== Gameplay today ==
Games have become more complex as technology has improved. Today, nearly every genre of video game contains some level of "twitch", though turn-based strategy games have remained roughly untouched by the phenomenon. First-person shooters remain the predominant genre to emphasize twitch gameplay.

Some games include elements that take players back in nostalgic gameplay in the form of quick time events or QTEs. These events decide the fate of the player by displaying a keystroke or keystrokes (often referred to as combos or combinations) that the player must input quickly. While the concept is not new, the term is often attributed to Yu Suzuki, director of the game Shenmue, an adventure game that introduced QTEs as a way to keep players interested during extended cut scenes. Other games have since adopted this method (e.g. Resident Evil 4).

== Twitch shooter ==
Twitch shooters such as Doom Eternal share many of the traits of twitch gameplay and are typically characterised by its fast-paced action but differentiates with other shooters due to a lack of cover system and a focus on strafing to avoid projectiles and attacks. Twitch shooters are often described as being more difficult than games of a similar genre due to a demand for skill and superior reaction times.
