= Igor: Objective Uikokahonia =

1994 video game

- Spanish cover art
- Developer: Pendulo Studios
- Publishers: DROsoft; Optik Software (North America); Dinamic Multimedia (Spanish re-release)
- Platform: DOS
- Release: ESP: 1994; US: 1995
- Genre: Graphic adventure
- Mode: Single-player

Igor: Objective Uikokahonia (Note: Spanish: Igor: Objetivo Uikokahonia) is a 1994 graphic adventure game developed by the Spanish company Pendulo Studios and published by DROsoft. The game tells the story of Igor Parker, a university student in love with a classmate named Laura Wright. Hoping to win her affection, Igor surmounts a series of obstacles in an effort to join her on a field trip to the island paradise of Uikokahonia. The player assumes the role of Igor and navigates the campus while collecting items, solving puzzles and conversing with non-player characters.

Igor entered development in 1993, as a part-time project between friends Ramón Hernáez, Rafael Latiegui, Felipe Gómez Pinilla and Miguel Angel Ramos. All four were fans of adventure games, and they hoped to emulate existing titles in the genre. Part of their motivation derived from the historic nature of Igor, since a graphic adventure game of its type had never been developed in Spain. After securing a publishing deal, the team incorporated as Pendulo Studios and hired freelancers for the game's music and backgrounds. Spain's weak game industry hampered production: Pendulo's working conditions were poor, and Igor was made on a low budget below 400,000 pesetas. The game was completed after roughly nine months.

In Spain, Igor received positive reviews from magazines such as Super PC and Micromanía. It sold well enough to encourage Pendulo to pursue game development as a profession, although the company was disappointed by the sales of the English localization. Since its release, Igor has been cited as a landmark Spanish game, as an important stepping stone for Spanish game development and as an inspiration for other Spanish companies to create graphic adventures. It was officially released as freeware in 2007. With Igor behind it, Pendulo proceeded to become a highly regarded developer in Spain via titles such as Hollywood Monsters and Runaway: A Road Adventure. By 2019, it was Spain's longest-running game development studio.

== Gameplay and plot ==
Igor stands in the university library. The player has highlighted the "Use" icon on the action list; the inventory takes up the bottom of the screen.

Igor: Objective Uikokahonia is a graphic adventure game controlled with a point-and-click interface, in a style that has been compared to LucasArts adventure games. Gameplay involves navigating the game world, conversing with non-player characters, solving puzzles and gathering and using items. The player interacts via a mouse by selecting actions, such as "Look" or "Take", from a list in the lower part of the screen. These actions may then be performed on hot spots in the game world. Below the action list is the player's inventory, which stores items for later use. During conversations with other characters, the inventory is replaced by dialogue options. Igor does not contain character death or dead-end states: the player may attempt any action without risking a game over.

The game begins as Igor Parker, a university student, overhears his crush Laura Wright speaking with the campus playboy, Philip Goolash. In the conversation, Igor learns that Laura is going with the Biology class on a field trip to the island paradise of Uikokahonia. Philip, who is infatuated with Laura, opts to join her. Igor believes that the trip is his own opportunity to get closer to Laura and plans to come along, with the goal of defeating his rival. However, Igor is not enrolled in Biology and cannot afford the admission fee for the field trip. As a third requirement, he must also present a final project for the semester. Igor begins by distracting the dean's secretary and secretly writing his name in her files to enroll himself in Biology. He enlists the school nerd, Harrison, to do his Biology schoolwork in exchange for a blind date with a girl on campus. To pay for the trip, Igor tracks down a statue recently stolen from a museum by the art thief Ricky the Weasel, and turns it over to the police for reward money. While carrying out these tasks, Igor several times runs into Laura, who consistently sees him performing what appear to be good deeds.

Igor's plans go awry when the Biology professor catches him cheating on his final exam, and Igor is barred from the field trip to Uikokahonia. However, he is able to improvise by smuggling himself in a crate bound for the island, and he parachutes down to Uikokahonia. In the process, he loses most of the items from his inventory, including a boomerang. He reaches Uikokahonia to find Philip acting aggressively toward Laura, and Igor is nearly drawn into a fight, but his boomerang returns and knocks Philip out. His victory and previous actions throughout the game ultimately win Laura over, and the two kiss as the game ends.

== Development ==
Igor: Objective Uikokahonia originated in early 1993 when Ramón Hernáez, a Spanish programmer of business software, became interested in developing his own graphic adventure game. He was joined on the project by his friends Rafael Latiegui, Felipe Gómez Pinilla and Miguel Angel Ramos around the middle of that year. The team's members had been students together in college, and Hernáez and Pinilla—another business software programmer—were childhood friends. According to Latiegui, the team felt that it could create an adventure title of equal quality to others on the market, and intended Igor "[f]rom the very beginning" as a commercial release rather than an amateur project. The four were encouraged by their belief that "many published things did not have great quality", as Latiegui noted. Everyone on the team was a fan of adventure games, and Hernáez cited Igor's historic significance as further inspiration to pursue the idea. While Spanish developers like Aventuras AD had released interactive fiction games during the 1980s, including those with graphics, a graphic adventure game like Igor had never been made in Spain.

According to Latiegui, Igor's development was "absolutely amateurish". He later called it "more of an exercise to start learning", and noted that the team was self-taught throughout production. The four members did not consider player experience or financial issues while creating Igor, Hernáez explained, but simply made a game that interested them personally. They emulated other graphic adventure titles from the time, especially Indiana Jones and the Fate of Atlantis, although Latiegui and Ramos stressed that the team tried not to copy rival games directly. The decision not to include character death was "a kind of principle that we have set for all our future games", as Latiegui said in 1994. During the initial months, the four worked on Igor inconsistently and in their spare time, without a professional schedule. They began by creating a game engine, written in Pascal. Pinilla and Latiegui later cited quality concerns with the resultant code. With the engine ready, the team conceived Igor's plot, which Latiegui described as a simple boy-meets-girl story. He wrote that the script "suffered ten thousand changes" and was influenced by the team's time in college; its use of archetypical school story characters derived "unconsciously" from the team's experiences, he said. Similarly, Ramos said that the game's Spanish sense of humor was a natural and "unintentional" outgrowth of the team's interests.

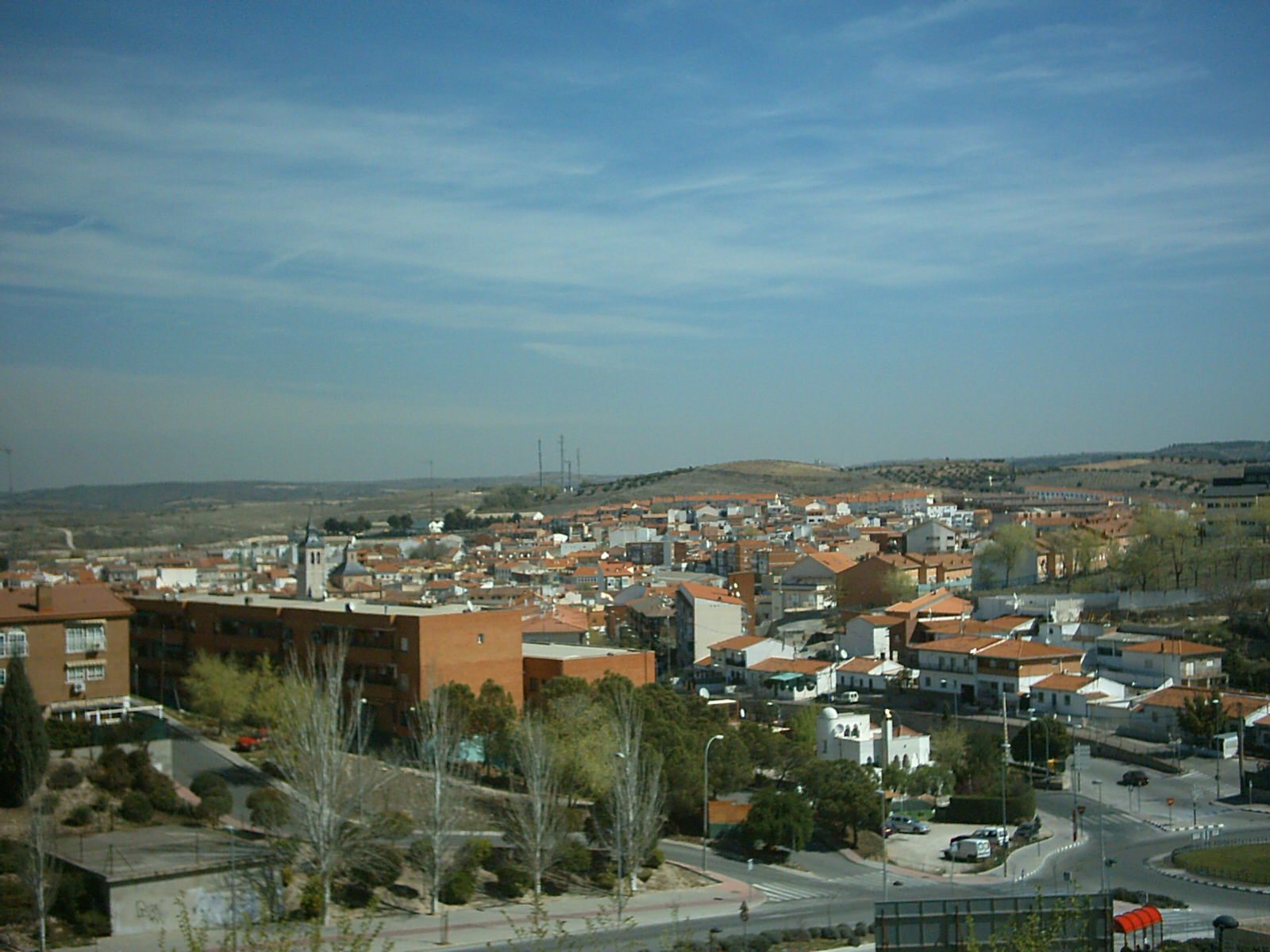
During Igor's creation, Pendulo Studios spent several months based inside a warehouse in Madrid's Arganda del Rey region (pictured).

The team proceeded to create a demo for Igor and display it to prospective publishers, such as DROsoft and Erbe Software. Offers quickly emerged, although certain publishers were skeptical, and one refused to consider the project because it perceived Spanish games as low-quality. Hernáez said that the group "really saw that [it] could move forward with the project" around three months into Igor's development. While Dinamic Multimedia bid on the game, the team ultimately chose DROsoft. According to Pinilla, the realization that the game would be published inspired him and the others to incorporate. Latiegui, Hernáez, Pinilla and Ramos co-founded Pendulo Studios in Madrid during September 1993, with the goal of completing Igor. They began to develop the game in a more structured, full-time manner, and soon contracted the freelance artist Carlos Veredas, who created the game's background artworks. They were illustrated on paper before being digitized. For the soundtrack, Pendulo employed freelancer Esteban Moreno. Hernáez later called locating and paying a background artist the "most complicated part" of Igor's development, as the team needed someone who would work for very little money.

As a Spanish game, Igor was developed in difficult economic circumstances. Spain's game industry had thrived in the golden age of Spanish software, but the 16-bit era heralded a market collapse for game development in the country. Much of the scene had disappeared by the early 1990s. Pendulo noted that "there was practically no national production and the prospects were not too encouraging" when Igor began, and Latiegui recalled a moment when the team nearly abandoned the project because of low financial projections by publishers. The game's budget was small—Gerard Masnou of GameLive PC later reported that it was below 400,000 pesetas—and the team's working conditions were poor. Pendulo was located for a time in the corner of a warehouse in Madrid's Arganda del Rey municipality. Writing in 1994, Francisco Gutiérrez of PC Manía called Igor's existence "extraordinary" given the state of the industry, and cited Pendulo as one of Spain's few current developers to successfully see a game to completion. In retrospect, Pinilla summarized the company's situation as a serious challenge, and said that it only grew harder after Igor was finished. The game underwent a fast production cycle and wrapped roughly six months after full-time production started. DROsoft launched Igor in summer 1994, on floppy disks and exclusively for DOS.

=== Versions ===
Following the release of Igor in Spain, Pendulo Studios signed with Infogrames in 1994 to publish the game across Europe. A writer for PC Manía opined at the time that this announcement could mark "the first important step toward the resurgence of national [Spanish] software". Pendulo began by rewriting the game's engine: according to Ramón Hernáez, the team realized that "the engine had to be improved to offer more quality". Igor's character graphics were redone, and the upgraded engine employed protected mode and featured support for voice-overs, enhanced scrolling, a 320x200 screen resolution and other features. However, Rafael Latiegui later said that this edition of Igor was canceled "due to internal problems" at Infogrames. Another version of the game, which contains new backgrounds and coding upgrades, was developed by Pendulo for the United States market. It was published in the country by Optik Software in 1995. Pendulo later characterized Optik's distribution job as poor, and argued that sales were low as a result. Latiegui accused the publisher of failing to pay Pendulo any royalties. Pendulo declared it a mistake to sign with Optik, and reported that "we paid for our inexperience by rejecting an offer that would have been more interesting". Igor ultimately failed to see success outside Spain.

In mid-1998, Igor was relaunched via a promotional campaign by the Spanish newspaper El Mundo, in partnership with Dinamic Multimedia. Released on CD-ROM, this edition of the game retailed for 720 pesetas and was available as an optional purchase alongside the paper. It includes the updates from the United States release, but adds full voice-overs and improvements to the music and sound effects. Optik had also released a CD-ROM version of Igor, complete with English voice acting, but Agustin Cordes of Just Adventure wrote that it had become "one of the most difficult to find versions of any game" by 2004.

== Reception ==
Reception

Review scores
Publication	Score
Micromanía	88/100
Super PC	80–90/100
PC Manía	88/100
Just Adventure	B−

According to HobbyConsolas, Igor: Objective Uikokahonia was well-received by adventure game players but did not have the sales success as Pendulo Studios expected. In contrast, Rafael Latiegui called it successful enough to inspire the team to pursue game development as a profession. He said in 1998 that the game ultimately "served more than anything to make us known".

Igor's visuals received praise from both Micromanía and PC Manía, while Antonio J. Martinez of Super PC found the characters, screen scrolling and background artwork "quite well achieved". Writers from all three publications cited the soundtrack as a high point. Martinez summarized that "despite its simplicity, there is no doubt that Igor is a good national premiere for this style of game". In Micromanía, Enrique Ricart went further, writing that Igor was of a "quality that [had] nothing to envy" from international competitors such as Indiana Jones and the Fate of Atlantis. He praised Igor's story and "logical" gameplay, and called the game an encouraging sign for the Spanish game industry, a sentiment echoed in PC Manía's review. In a 2004 retrospective review, Agustin Cordes of Just Adventure described Igor as "neither revolutionary or novel" despite its "huge impact" domestically, although he enjoyed the game's humor and visuals. He argued that Igor had "stood the test of time" but was nevertheless unsatisfying because of its unrealized potential.

== Legacy ==
These four young people, helped by a cartoonist and a musician, can be the starting point for Spanish entertainment software ... [W]e finally have a Spanish graphic adventure that will open a gap for all Hispanic developers who venture into those complicated and difficult lands.

— Enrique Ricart of Micromanía in 1994, on the significance of Igor: Objective Uikokahonia in Spain

Shortly after the release of Igor: Objective Uikokahonia, PC Manía cited the game and its developer as part of a positive trend in Spanish games, which saw "more and more companies join[ing] the slow national scene". As the first graphic adventure game developed in Spain, Igor "encouraged other [domestic] companies to devote themselves" to the genre, according to GameLive PC. Alejando Alcolea of HobbyConsolas retrospectively highlighted it as one of the two most important domestic games, alongside Pyro Studios' Commandos: Behind Enemy Lines, to be released in the 1990s after the Spanish game crash. In 2015, academic researchers Manuel Garin and Víctor Manuel Martínez called Igor "the first great achievement of the genre fully produced in Spain" and listed Pendulo as one of the "Five Significant Exceptions within the Decline of the 1990s", along with firms such as Pyro and Gaelco.

With Igor as its first game, Pendulo proceeded to become a major force in Spanish game development. While Spanish studios often worked in multiple genres, the team chose to remain fully focused on adventure games. Vandal's Julio Gómez later highlighted Igor as the beginning of Spain's "most important" adventure game developer; writers for publications such as PC Manía and El Mundo declared Pendulo the Spanish equivalent to LucasArts. Manuel and Martínez characterized Pendulo as one of the companies that "not only defined indigenous production in the 1990s but also shaped its future in the decades that followed". After Igor's release, Miguel Angel Ramos left the team; Rafael Latiegui, Ramón Hernáez and Felipe Gómez Pinilla continued Pendulo alone. Their second game was Hollywood Monsters (1997), in which they diverged from the development process used for Igor. Pinilla explained that they "started from scratch in everything". The game was a critical and commercial hit, with sales above 250,000 units in Spain by 2011, and it marked a turning point for Pendulo. Despite calling Igor a "great adventure", Francisco Delgado of Micromanía said that Hollywood Monsters "was the game that really brought fame and the mass market to" the developer. However, like Igor, it failed to become an international hit.

Pendulo went on to be Spain's longest-running game development studio by 2019. A writer for HobbyConsolas called Pendulo a team of "true survivors", but noted that the company "had nothing easy, and even almost disappeared on a couple of occasions". While Pendulo saw its first international breakthrough with Runaway: A Road Adventure (2001), the game suffered major distribution setbacks due to the liquidation of publisher Dinamic Multimedia, which nearly bankrupted Pendulo. The game nevertheless sold over 600,000 units in Europe, which stabilized Pendulo and allowed it to create Runaway 2: The Dream of the Turtle (2006). The company followed up with the adventure titles Runaway: A Twist of Fate, The Next Big Thing and, in 2012, Yesterday. Thereafter, Pendulo entered another period of financial uncertainty, but rebounded with Yesterday Origins in 2016 via publisher Microïds. The two collaborated again on Blacksad: Under the Skin, an adaptation of the Spanish comic series Blacksad. Manuel and Martínez summarized: "Without making too much noise or boasting about it, this humble studio is one of the few national companies that has remained working in a genre and a gaming idea for almost two decades". In 2017, Clara Castaño Ruiz of HobbyConsolas declared Pendulo "synonymous with graphic adventures in Spain" and one of the country's most significant developers.

In retrospect, HobbyConsolas named Igor one of the best adventure games ever developed in Spain. Assessing the game's place in Spanish adventure game history by 2008, Julio Gómez found Igor's story subpar but nevertheless argued that the "spectacular technical section and well-made puzzles offered an experience nothing short of miraculous". Micromanía's Santiago Tejedor highlighted the game in 2015 as an early sign of Pendulo's skill at storytelling and characterization. In 2001, Gerard Masnou of GameLive PC called it "without a doubt [one of] the two best graphic adventures" that Spain had produced, although he wrote in 2003 that it was "not comparable to ... the best adventures published internationally" in its day. A writer for Gry Online echoed this complaint and went further, declaring Igor inferior to the LucasArts titles that had inspired it, despite the quality of the game's puzzles and comedy. Pendulo itself reported that it was still "proud" of Igor by 2001, as it was an important stepping stone toward its more ambitious projects. The company announced the game's release as freeware during the Adventure Developers Online Conference 2007. In 2011, Latiegui said that "we would lie if we said that the idea [of an Igor sequel] has never crossed our minds", but that it was the Pendulo game "with the least chance of coming back".

== See also ==
- 3 Skulls of the Toltecs
- Dráscula: The Vampire Strikes Back
