= Hollywood Monsters =

Hollywood Monsters may refer to:

- Hollywood Monsters (band), an American hard rock supergroup formed in 2013
- Hollywood Monsters (video game), a 1997 adventure game by Spanish developer Pendulo Studios
- The Next Big Thing (video game), a 2011 adventure game by Pendulo Studios that was re-released under the name Hollywood Monsters in 2012
