= Hidden Runaway =

2012 video game

- Hidden Runaway App Store logo
- Developer: Pendulo Studios
- Publisher: BulkyPix (iOS)
- Platforms: iOS, Windows
- Release: October 18, 2012 (iOS)
- Genre: Hidden object
- Mode: Single-player

Hidden Runaway is a 2012 hidden object game developed by the Spanish company Pendulo Studios and published by BulkyPix. It follows protagonists Brian Basco and Gina Timmins as they retell events from Runaway: A Road Adventure (2001) to a film producer interested in their life story. Along the way, the player plays minigames and searches for objects hidden in the game's environments. Hidden Runaway marked a departure for Pendulo, as it was the company's first casual game and first project outside the graphic adventure game genre.

Hidden Runaway was developed during a difficult economic period for Pendulo, and the game was itself a commercial failure. It remained Pendulo's worst-selling title by 2016 and contributed to a financial decline at the company. Critical reviews for Hidden Runaway were "mixed or average", according to Metacritic. Following Hidden Runaway, Pendulo stopped releasing original games for several years, until it returned with Yesterday Origins in 2016.

== Gameplay and plot ==
The player searches a backdrop for hidden objects, aided by the object list at the top of the screen.

Hidden Runaway is a hidden object game. The player searches static backdrops for a series of objects concealed in the game world, as indicated by a list on the screen. Locating enough of these objects rewards the player with key items that enable progression through the story, via either their combination or their use on the environment. The key items needed to complete the player's goals are displayed at the start of each scene. Alongside its object-hunt gameplay, Hidden Runaway features optional minigame puzzle sequences, such as matching musical notes, piecing together a ripped ticket or playing a variant of Whac-A-Mole. Once completed, minigames may be replayed at any time.

Hidden Runaway's story retells the first half of Runaway: A Road Adventure, the debut game in the Runaway series. It is set after that game's events: protagonists Brian Basco and Gina Timmins have since fallen out with each other, but have been reunited by a film producer to recount their life story for the script of his new feature. This frame story progresses via cutscenes between gameplay sequences; gameplay occurs during flashbacks to moments from the first Runaway. The retelling concludes when Brian and Gina describe their arrival in Arizona's Hopi region. Afterward, the player encounters a minigame sequence and a teaser for Hidden Runaway 2, which was planned to continue the story.

== Development ==
Following the release of Runaway: A Twist of Fate (2009), the Spanish company Pendulo Studios retired its Runaway franchise and chose to explore other projects, citing exhaustion with the series. Rafael Latiegui of Pendulo noted that "2–3 scripts" for Runaway 4 existed by 2011, but that no new entries were yet planned. However, mobile game publisher BulkyPix revealed a new installment under the name Hidden Runaway, developed by Pendulo, at the Game Developers Conference in March 2012. TouchArcade reported at the time that Hidden Runaway would be a hidden object title that featured 12 minigames. It was one of Pendulo's two projects, alongside the crowdfunded Day One, planned to follow the studio's 2012 game Yesterday. According to writer Josué Monchan, both projects came at a difficult time for Pendulo, as the commercial failure of The Next Big Thing and ultimately Yesterday alienated publishers and made funding hard to obtain.

Hidden Runaway marked a departure for Pendulo. Lead programmer Felipe Gómez Pinilla called it the team's first title outside the adventure genre, for which Pendulo had been known since its 1994 debut. Latiegui summarized it as "Runaway revisited in a casual way", and studio head Ramón Hernáez noted that it was Pendulo's first foray into the casual game market. In 2012, he called hidden object games "very attractive for us" going forward, as they were similar to Pendulo's existing work but at a smaller scale and with different expectations from buyers. Hernáez said that Hidden Runaway would be the first of several casual titles intended as lighthearted counterparts to the studio's darker Yesterday and Day One. Latiegui and Monchan characterized Hidden Runaway's development as an enjoyable new experience. Conversely, Pendulo composer Juan Miguel Marín later dubbed it "the only time that Pendulo Studios responded to the demands of the market", and unsatisfying as a result.

Hidden Runaway was developed for Microsoft Windows, OS X and iOS devices, and was initially scheduled for a May 2012 release. The game remained in production by August, at which point it was undergoing the final stages of development, Latiegui said. BulkyPix launched Hidden Runaway for iOS via the App Store on October 18, 2012. In Germany, its computer version debuted in retail stores during August 2013, published for Windows by Rondomedia.

== Reception ==
Reception

Aggregate score
| Aggregator | Score |
|---|---|
| Metacritic | 65/100 |

Review scores
| Publication | Score |
|---|---|
| HobbyConsolas | 82/100 |
| Jeuxvideo.com | 10/20 |
| Pocket Gamer | 6/10 |
| Vandal | 8.5/10 |
| IGN España | 8.5/10 |

Metacritic calculated Hidden Runaway's reviews as "mixed or average". Writing for Pocket Gamer, Harry Slater found the game "interesting, if ultimately disappointing". He praised its story and visual presentation, but felt that its object-hunting sections were poorly balanced and paced. Jeuxvideo.com's reviewer echoed Slater's praise for the visuals but broke with him on the gameplay: the writer argued that Hidden Runaway is a solid execution of the hidden object formula, which recaptures the atmosphere of earlier Runaway titles. However, he sharply criticized Hidden Runaway's sudden ending, with its "completely inappropriate" Whac-a-Mole section and "attempt to beg" for money to make Hidden Runaway 2. As a result, he concluded that the game has a "very bitter" aftertaste for players.

In Spain, Hidden Runaway won positive scores from David Alonso Hernández of HobbyConsolas and Fernando Fontanet-Bel of Vandal, while Gina Tost of IGN España called it evidence that Spain's game industry was "in very good shape". Hernández and Fontanet-Bel both enjoyed the gameplay, and, like Jeuxvideo.com's writer, felt that Hidden Runaway effectively translated Pendulo Studios' style to a touch-controlled casual format. However, although Fontanet-Bel was unbothered by the game's limited animation, Hernández considered it a downside that hurt the title's overall presentation. He also found the audio lacking. Fontanet-Bel concluded his review by calling Hidden Runaway an encouraging sign for Pendulo's future on iOS, but Hernández went further, arguing that it "once again highlights the enormous potential of smartphones and tablets when it comes to embracing graphic adventures".

In 2014, Pendulo's Josué Monchan called Hidden Runaway "a complete disaster" financially. According to Juan Miguel Marín, it was the company's worst-selling game by October 2016. Combined with the poor performances of The Next Big Thing and Yesterday, and the failed crowdfunding campaign of Day One, Hidden Runaway contributed to Pendulo's financial decline. After its release, the company entered a multi-year period in which it launched no original games, and instead ported its back catalog to iOS in an attempt to survive. Pendulo ultimately returned with the game Yesterday Origins in 2016.
