= Pendulo Studios =

Spanish video game developer

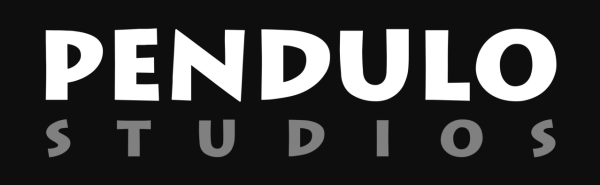
- Type: Private
- Industry: Video games
- Founded: September 1993; 33 years ago
- Founders: Rafael Latiegui; Ramón Hernáez; Felipe Gómez Pinilla; Miguel Angel Ramos
- Defunct: March 2025
- Headquarters: Madrid, Spain
- Key people: Ramón Hernáez; Felipe Gómez Pinilla; Rafael Latiegui; Josué Monchan
- Products: Hollywood Monsters series; Runaway series; Yesterday series
- Website: pendulo-studios.com

Pendulo Studios S.L. was a Madrid-based video game developer founded in 1993 by Ramón Hernáez, Felipe Gómez Pinilla, Rafael Latiegui and Miguel Angel Ramos. Since the company's 1994 debut project, Igor: Objective Uikokahonia, it has specialized in graphic adventure games. Pendulo first achieved mainstream prominence in Spain via Hollywood Monsters (1997), which met with critical and commercial success in the country but was never released beyond Southern Europe.

The company broke into the international market with its third game, Runaway: A Road Adventure (2001), whose hit status in Europe contributed to the reenergization of the adventure game genre. It also saved Pendulo from bankruptcy, following the closure of its publisher Dinamic Multimedia. Thereafter, Pendulo created two sequels to Runaway; the series collectively had sold more than 1.5 million units worldwide by 2010. After the release of Yesterday in 2012, Pendulo entered another period of financial uncertainty, but in 2014 signed a deal with Microids that led to the creation of Yesterday Origins, Blacksad: Under the Skin and other titles. Following the poor sales performance of Tintin Reporter – Cigars of the Pharaoh, Pendulo Studios ceased operating in March 2025.

As of 2019, Pendulo Studios was Spain's longest-running active game development company. The company has been cited as a major force in Spanish game development, particularly in the adventure genre. In 2017, the Spanish publication HobbyConsolas declared Pendulo "synonymous with graphic adventures in Spain" and one of the country's most significant developers.

== History ==
=== Early years: 1993–1997 ===
Pendulo Studios was established in Madrid during September 1993 by Ramón Hernáez, Rafael Latiegui, Felipe Gómez Pinilla and Miguel Angel Ramos. The founders had been students together in college, and they formed for the purpose of creating a graphic adventure game. While Spanish developers like Aventuras AD had released successful interactive fiction games in the 1980s, including those with graphics, a fully graphic adventure game had never been made in Spain.

The result was Igor: Objective Uikokahonia in 1994, a game developed in dire economic circumstances by Pendulo's four founders, assisted by two contractors. While Spain's game industry had thrived in the golden age of Spanish software, the 16-bit era had heralded a market collapse for game development in the country. Pendulo later noted that "there was practically no national production and the prospects were not too encouraging" when Igor began, and Latiegui recalled a moment when the team nearly abandoned the project because of low financial projections by publishers. The team's funds were limited—Gerard Masnou of GameLive PC reported that Igor was made on a budget under 400,000 pesetas—and working conditions were poor. Pendulo was located for a time in the corner of a warehouse in Madrid's Arganda del Rey municipality. According to Latiegui, Igor's development was "absolutely amateurish", and he noted that the team was self-taught throughout production. In retrospect, Pinilla summarized Pendulo's situation during Igor as a serious challenge. Nevertheless, Latiegui later called the game successful enough to inspire Pendulo to pursue game development as a profession.

Ramos ultimately left Pendulo after Igor's completion, but Latiegui, Ramón Hernáez and Felipe Gómez Pinilla chose to continue the company alone. Pendulo's second game was Hollywood Monsters. The team found it to be a significantly greater challenge than Igor had been, and its budget was tight. It required a long production cycle of around two and a half years. Including the voice cast, roughly 40 people contributed to Hollywood Monsters, most of them outside contractors. Hernáez said that managing the large number of contributors was the "most important change" to Pendulo's development process since Igor. Pinilla told Game 40 that development would have gone faster with more contributors, but that it was "impossible to have more people." Spain's game development industry remained weak during production: Francisco Delgado of Micromanía cited Hollywood Monsters as one of the few Spanish-made games under development in 1997. To obtain a theme song for Hollywood Monsters, publisher Dinamic Multimedia hired the band La Unión to record an original track.

Upon its launch in December 1997, Hollywood Monsters became a hit. In 2011, a writer for MarcaPlayer called it "one of the most played and best-selling adventures in Spanish software" history. It had sold 250,000 units in Spain alone by that date. As a greater commercial and critical success than Igor: Objective Uikokahonia, Hollywood Monsters marked a turning point for Pendulo Studios. It has been cited by publications such as PC Actual, 3DJuegos, Vandal and MeriStation as the title that put Pendulo on the map. It became a classic in its home country, although it failed to see releases outside Southern Europe. In 1997, a PC Manía writer cited Hollywood Monsters as proof that Pendulo "is to graphic adventure in Spain what LucasArts is to the rest of the world." Xan Pita of El Mundo later remarked, "Thanks to this game, ... Pendulo made a good dent in the industry."

=== Financial upheaval and recovery: 1998–2003 ===
Hollywood Monsters' success led Pendulo to begin a sequel. However, the project changed shape to become Runaway: A Road Adventure, conceived during summer 1998. Runaway became Pendulo's largest production to date, and GameLive PC's Gerard Masnou wrote that it "was the most ambitious graphic adventure ever developed in Spain" at the time. According to Joan Font of GameLive PC, the industry still suffered from a dearth of professional talent while Runaway was in development. Spain's education system lacked courses for game development, and the country's existing industry professionals often migrated to foreign companies for better working conditions and pay. As a result, most of Pendulo's staff on Runaway consisted of autodidacts who learned in part on the job. The game's team was small: Rafael Latiegui said that Runaway had nine core members during most of its creation, assisted by a series of part-timers on elements such as music. Despite the industry's limited workforce, Ramón Hernáez said that Pendulo had a "relatively" easy time finding talent.

Originally planned as a 2D project, Runaway was revamped during development to utilize 3D aspects, and after numerous delays debuted in Spain during July 2001. Early sales reports were positive, but the game's performance was severely hampered by the bankruptcy of its publisher, Dinamic, that September. The closure was a major blow to the Spanish game industry: MarcaPlayer later called it "probably the most traumatic event that the Spanish video game industry has experienced in history". Although English, Italian and German localizations of Runaway had been planned, the closure of Dinamic cast doubt on the game's future outside Spain. Latiegui remarked at the time that, unless a deal to repurchase the rights from Dinamic emerged "very quickly", Pendulo could go bankrupt. Pendulo proceeded to undertake lawsuits and engage the publisher in a legal battle for the rights, a process that lasted roughly one year. Pendulo struggled to stay solvent. Latiegui later called the period an extreme challenge; the company had to lay off the majority of its staff to make payroll, and Pendulo ceased game development activities.

Pendulo secured the rights to Runaway in July 2002. At the time, Latiegui said that the developer could recover if the game sold well enough, noting that Pendulo had "never stopped having development ideas". It was released in the German market by DTP Entertainment, and met with commercial success there. Pendulo soon landed deals to launch the game in Poland and France, the latter through Focus Home Interactive. By January 2004, Runaway's sales totaled 400,000 units at full price in Europe. The game's success financially stabilized Pendulo, which rehired most of its layoffs from the Dinamic turmoil. Felipe Gómez Pinilla dubbed the game "a turning point for" the company; in 2015, researchers Víctor Manuel Martínez and Manuel Garin cited Runaway as the start of Pendulo's own brand of adventure game. Its later games reused Runaway's cartoonish aesthetic. Runaway's popularity also helped to reinvigorate the adventure genre as a whole, which had been seen as a declining field in countries such as Germany and France. Runaway has been cited as a contributing factor to the reenergization of adventure games by publications such as La Libre Belgique, Gameblog, GameStar, Hamburger Wirtschaft, Jeux Video, PC Games and MeriStation.

=== Runaway sequels: 2003–2009 ===

The Runaway trilogy became Pendulo's most successful series, with 1.5 million units sold by 2010.

Pendulo Studios began to plan a sequel to Runaway soon after the first game's international launch. Rafael Latiegui later said that the team "wanted to immediately get [into] a video game" after spending a year away, and that a sequel was the "quickest way" because of the groundwork already laid. He noted that Runaway had not been developed with a sequel in mind, but that a large number of unused ideas nevertheless remained after the first game's release. The first game's commercial performance, combined with the team's desire to explore Runaway further, ultimately became a key inspiration to greenlight a sequel.

Runaway 2 was first announced by DTP Entertainment in August 2003, at the Games Convention in Leipzig. Pendulo opted to reuse the same game engine from the first title, with upgrades. The project was initially scheduled for late 2004. Because of Runaway's high profits, Pendulo was able to put its own money into Runaway 2, although most of the game's funding derived from French investments. The game underwent numerous delays, first to mid-2005 and then to late 2005, spring 2006 and September 2006. Discussing these setbacks at the time, Latiegui argued that it was "important for the quality of development" to take precedence over deadlines. Released in November 2006 as Runaway 2: The Dream of the Turtle, the game continues the story of Brian Basco and Gina, who fall into trouble because of a plane crash during their vacation to Hawaii. Runaway 2 received an international release roughly 8 months before its mid-2007 Spanish launch.

A third Runaway game was considered during Runaway 2's creation, and Pendulo unofficially confirmed that it was under development in November 2006. It received an official announcement at Games Convention in August 2007; certain outlets initially reported that Runaway 3 would be set in Japan and would take place immediately after its predecessor. The game was first shown in February 2008 at the Game Developers Conference, where its name was revealed as Runaway: A Twist of Fate. Pendulo and publisher Focus Home Interactive hoped to attract series newcomers with the numberless title, and Jeux Video reported that the game was "not the direct follow-up" to Runaway 2, but a relatively standalone project. A new engine was adopted for A Twist of Fate that offered improved graphics, although the game retained a pre-rendered 2D visual style. A Twist of Fate tells the story of Brian's attempt to escape from an insane asylum, where he is detained after being accused of murder. Unlike the first two Runaway entries, the game features Gina as a playable character alongside Brian. A Twist of Fate was first released internationally in November 2009; its Spanish version, again delayed, launched in early 2010. By the time of its Spanish release, global sales of the three Runaway games had reached 1.5 million units, according to ABC.

=== Diversification and renewed financial trouble: 2010–2014 ===
Pendulo opted to retire the Runaway franchise after A Twist of Fate, although the team retained ideas for potential sequels. Latiegui explained in 2011, "After almost a decade with the saga, we needed a break." The team reported that it was particularly tired of Brian as a character. Instead, the team chose to pursue a new project under the name The Next Big Thing. Fan requests for a sequel to Hollywood Monsters were ongoing throughout the creation of the Runaway trilogy. Latiegui said of the situation, "To each new game that we have been making, the reaction of the Spanish public has been the same: 'When is the next Hollywood Monsters?' " This pressure from fans became a key motivation for the team to return to the Hollywood Monsters concept. In April 2010, Pendulo and publisher Focus Home Interactive announced The Next Big Thing. Commentators from Adventure Gamers and Jeux Video noted the project's close similarity to Hollywood Monsters, and in April 2011 the game was retitled Hollywood Monsters 2 in Spain.

At the start, Pendulo conceived The Next Big Thing as a high-definition remake of Hollywood Monsters, but it increasingly drifted from this framework over time. Latiegui explained that the final product "is not a second part, nor a remake"; rather, the team borrowed heavily from Hollywood Monsters and attempted to take its ideas in new directions. Sue Bergman and Ron Ashman were removed in favor of new protagonists: reporters Dan Murray and Liz Allaire of The Quill. As with Hollywood Monsters, The Next Big Thing takes place in a fantasy version of Hollywood where monsters act in films. The story explores the film industry's shift away from monster movies, which threatens to leave their casts out of work. The Next Big Thing first launched in April 2011, and it proved to be a "huge failure" commercially, according to Pendulo's Josué Monchan.

Rethinking the company's style and brand after the failure of The Next Big Thing, Pendulo opted to create a game with a darker, more serious tone and more casual gameplay. Monchan stated that Pendulo could not find funding for a more traditional project. As a result, the team created Yesterday (2012), its first fully dramatic title. However, Pendulo was hit hard by Spanish economic turmoil; Yesterday's budget was significantly smaller than the one for Runaway 3. Monchan noted that Yesterday again underperformed, which he blamed in part on a publisher that had lost faith in the team's ability to succeed. Pendulo undertook a new Runaway title in 2012, under the name Hidden Runaway. Unlike Pendulo's earlier work, Hidden Runaway is a hidden object game aimed at casual players. The game was released for iOS devices in October 2012, and proved once again to be a commercial failure.

Unable to find an investor for another game, Pendulo turned to a crowdfunding campaign in 2012 for the tentative project Day One. The campaign proved unsuccessful; Monchan stated that Pendulo had not spent time building a network of connections that would allow it to survive without a publisher. Following Pendulo's failure to fund Day One, the company entered a two-year period in which it released no original games. Albert Garciá of La Vanguardia noted that "the future of this company was uncertain" during the period. To survive during these two years, Pendulo downsized and spent time porting its existing catalogue of games to iOS. Monchan compared the strategy to one that Revolution Software had previously used to stay solvent, and noted that The Next Big Thing and Yesterday saw more success on mobile devices than they had on personal computers.

=== With Microids: 2014–present ===
In November 2014, Pendulo Studios began an undisclosed new project with publisher Microids, ending its hiatus from original releases. The two companies announced the deal that December. Pendulo and Microids proceeded to release a sequel to Yesterday, entitled Yesterday Origins, in November 2016. Directly after the game's completion, Microids proposed the idea of adapting the Blacksad comic series into a game. The publisher was owned by the same media conglomerate as Blacksad publisher Dargaud. Although Pendulo had never worked with a license before, the developer's Josué Monchán noted that the team had "been Blacksad fans for a long time" and agreed to the idea immediately. The team then storyboarded a pitch and submitted it to Dargaud and Blacksad's authors, who approved it. YS Interactive initially assisted Pendulo.

Blacksad: Under the Skin was unexpectedly announced in June 2017. Gameblog's Vincent Elmer-Haerrig called the project a "gamble" for Pendulo, as Under the Skin is aimed at "a fringe of players who are both comic-philes and video game lovers." It was Pendulo's first game to use fully 3D visuals. Lead animator Carlos Hernández told Mundo Deportivo that the game's production was "a great difficulty" for the team, particularly because of its small size: Pendulo numbered 17 members by 2019. Under the Skin was released in November 2019. In late 2020, Pendulo reported that "the impact [Blacksad] has had on the market has been much greater" than Pendulo's other recent titles, which the company attributed to the project's "more narrative, modern adventure" style.

In March 2018, during the production of Under the Skin, Microids announced that Pendulo would develop an adaptation of Alfred Hitchcock's film Vertigo. The publisher obtained the rights to Hitchcock's "name and likeness" for the game, Rock, Paper, Shotgun reported. According to Microids, the game would be "loosely" inspired by the film, following it aesthetically and thematically. In November 2020, Pendulo revealed that development of Vertigo was "quite advanced" and that it would be a "narrative adventure" title. The game was first shown at the Guerrilla Collective Showcase in June 2021, where its title was announced as Alfred Hitchcock – Vertigo. The game follows the story of Ed Miller, a man who enters therapy to cope with the mysterious after-effects of a car crash. Monchan noted that "Vertigo [was] not our only frame of reference" for the story, also citing Hitchcock's Spellbound, Rebecca and Psycho as influences, among others. The game was first released for computers in 2021, followed by a console release in 2022.

In August 2022, Microids revealed that Pendulo Studios was developing Tintin Reporter – Cigars of the Pharaoh, an "action and investigation adventure" based on the comic of the same name in the Adventures of Tintin series. Microids had announced its plan to publish an unnamed Tintin video game previously, after striking a deal with the Hergé Foundation in 2020. Tintin Reporter – Cigars of the Pharaoh was released for PlayStation 4, PlayStation 5, Windows, and Xbox Series X/S on November 7, 2023. It was later released for the Nintendo Switch on October 17, 2024. Cigars of the Pharaoh saw a poor sales performance, which staffers of Pendulo Studios blamed on decisions by Microids they believed caused delays and a decline the game's quality. In January 2025, Pendulo Studios laid off 33 people—44% of its workforce. In late March, the company ceased all operations, which the management chose not announce.

== Games developed ==
Year	Title	Genre	Platform(s)
1994	Igor: Objective Uikokahonia	Graphic adventure	MS-DOS
1997	Hollywood Monsters	Graphic adventure	Windows
2001	Runaway: A Road Adventure	Graphic adventure	iOS, Windows
2006	Runaway 2: The Dream of the Turtle	Graphic adventure	iOS, Nintendo DS, Wii, Windows
2009	Runaway: A Twist of Fate	Graphic adventure	iOS, Nintendo DS, Windows
2011	The Next Big Thing	Graphic adventure	iOS, macOS, Windows
2012	Yesterday	Graphic adventure	iOS, macOS, Windows
2012	Hidden Runaway	Hidden object	iOS, Windows
2016	Yesterday Origins	Graphic adventure	macOS, Nintendo Switch, PlayStation 4, Windows, Xbox One
2019	Blacksad: Under the Skin	Graphic adventure	macOS, Nintendo Switch, PlayStation 4, Windows, Xbox One
2021	Alfred Hitchcock – Vertigo	Graphic adventure	Nintendo Switch, PlayStation 4, PlayStation 5, Windows, Xbox One, Xbox Series X/S
2023	Tintin Reporter – Cigars of the Pharaoh	Action-adventure	Nintendo Switch, PlayStation 4, PlayStation 5, Windows, Xbox One, Xbox Series X/S

=== Cancelled ===
- Day One
