= Yesterday (video game) =

2012 video game

- British cover artwork
- Developer: Pendulo Studios
- Publishers: Focus Home Interactive, FX Interactive (Spain)
- Platforms: Microsoft Windows, iOS, Android
- Release: Windows; 22 March 2012 iOS; 21 June 2012; Android; 5 December 2012
- Genre: Adventure
- Mode: Single-player

Yesterday is a 2012 graphic adventure game developed by the Spanish company Pendulo Studios and published by Focus Home Interactive. It follows the story of John Yesterday, a man hired to investigate the murder of homeless people in New York City.

Yesterday's computer release received "mixed or average" reviews, according to Metacritic, and was a commercial disappointment. The iOS port saw more success both commercially and critically. Nevertheless, Yesterday's sales performance was part of a downward trend for Pendulo; after its release, the company struggled to find funding for new projects. Pendulo was revitalized in late 2014 by a contract with Microids to develop the Yesterday follow-up Yesterday Origins (2016), a prequel and sequel to the first game.

== Gameplay ==
Yesterday is a graphic adventure game controlled with a point-and-click interface.

== Plot ==
Yesterday begins in New York City, where a serial killer has been burning homeless people to death. The wealthy college student Henry White and his friend Samuel Cooper volunteer for the Children of Don Quixote charity, which seeks to help the city's homeless. The pair drive to an abandoned subway station; Henry enters while Cooper remains in their van. Inside, Henry is taken prisoner by a homeless man named Boris, who has been driven insane by past trauma. Boris follows the orders of another denizen of the subway, Choke, an unhinged cult leader who considers himself ruler of the area. Choke and Boris are the cult's only members; the rest of Choke's congregation consists of mannequins. Choke demands that Henry solve a series of chess problems as punishment for trespassing, but then refuses to release him and sentences him to die in a pit of rats. Henry secretly radios Cooper, who sneaks into the station, locates a gun and—while experiencing flashbacks to his childhood—kills Choke and subdues Boris. The pair learn that Choke's ceremony was a ruse; Henry had never been in danger. This enrages Henry, revealed to be the serial killer. Choke and Boris are loaded into the van. As it drives off, Choke miraculously stands up as Boris looks on and laughs.

Following a timeskip, Henry has inherited his father's company, White Enterprises. He meets with a man named John Yesterday, an amnesiac under Henry's care, with whom Henry claims to be old friends.

== Development ==
Pendulo Studios conceived Yesterday around 2009, during the development of Runaway: A Twist of Fate. Its early working title was Runaway Noire. Due to economic turbulence in Spain, Yesterday was developed on a tight budget. Felipe Gomez Pinilla noted that it was created with "one-quarter of the budget that we made Runaway: A Twist of Fate". Josué Monchan of Pendulo compared the game's central conceit to that of Planescape: Torment, but adapted to an adventure game rather than a role-playing game format. In response to market demands, Pendulo intentionally made the game easier than its past titles, as part of a yearslong trend at the company.

=== Release ===
Yesterday was released under multiple titles worldwide. According to Josué Monchan, the changes were made to tailor the game's marketing to each region, in an effort to increase sales. He noted that the Spanish title New York Crimes was selected by FX Interactive to "emphasize the thriller angle and comic aesthetic". The German title, The Case of John Yesterday, was designed to capitalize on the popularity of investigative games in that market, while the Russian title of Yesterday: Mark of Lucifer tried to appeal to Russia's interest in satanic subject matter. Monchan said that the game was entitled Yesterday: A Pendulo Studios Game in the English- and French-speaking world to lean on the company's brand. It was also released on iOS, Pendulo's first-ever attempt at the platform. Rafael Latiegui said that Pendulo "started from scratch, diving head-first into the uncharted waters".

== Reception ==
Reception

Aggregate score
Aggregator	Score
Metacritic	65/100

Review scores
Publication	Score
4Players	75/100
Destructoid	8/10
GameSpot	6/10
GameSpy	1.5/5
GameStar	78/100
Joystiq	4/5
PC Games (DE)	77%
Micromanía	90/100
Marca Player	8.7/10
Gameblog	4/5
MeriStation	8/10

The game received "mixed or average" reviews, according to the review aggregation website Metacritic.

Alasdair Duncan of Destructoid wrote in his review that, "Impressive effort with a few noticeable problems holding it back. Won't astound everyone, but is worth your time and cash." Chris Watters of GameSpot wrote, "Yesterday's unsteady narrative is disappointingly brief, though solid puzzles and nice visuals make it a pleasant diversion." Richard Cobbett of GameSpy wrote, "Even with its cliches, Yesterday probably looked good on paper. It's a comic-book-style thriller about a mysterious amnesiac (take a shot), which takes the graphical charm of the Runaway games and pushes them into the service of a much darker story full of mystery, murder, torture, and ancient conspiracies. All good stuff. In another life, it might even have worked. Unfortunately, in this one, the real dark secret has nothing to do with our hero John Yesterday's past. It's that his game is really, really stupid."

=== iOS port ===
Reception

Aggregate score
Aggregator	Score
Metacritic	77/100

Review scores
Publication	Score
4Players	75% (iPad); 74% (Android)
Pocket Gamer	4/10
TouchArcade	4.5/5
Slide to Play	4/4
Vandal	8.0/10

The iOS port received "generally favorable reviews", according to Metacritic. HobbyConsolas reported that Yesterday's iOS version remained one of the highest-rated Spanish games on Metacritic by 2017.

=== Sales ===
According to Josué Monchan of Pendulo Studios, Yesterday's computer release was a commercial disappointment. He attributed the game's failure to its blend of casual gameplay with "hardcore storytelling", to its publisher's limited support and to Pendulo's lack of interaction with players and the press. However, the game's iOS port saw greater success: Rafael Latiegui noted that it had "sold many more copies" than the computer version by August 2012. In 2014, Josué Monchan called it a "moderate hit" on the platform and said that it had out-earned the computer version.

== Aftermath and sequel ==
With the launch of its original computer version, Yesterday joined a list of commercial failures for Pendulo Studios, including The Next Big Thing and the console port of Runaway: A Twist of Fate. Following Yesterday, the 2012 hidden object game Hidden Runaway flopped as well. These failures eroded publisher trust in Pendulo. The team was unable to find backing for a new game and resorted to crowdfunding for its title Day One, but its campaign did not reach its goal. With no way of funding a new title, the team began to port its back catalog to iOS in an effort to survive. Monchan compared the strategy to one previously used by Revolution Software.

A sequel/prequel called Yesterday Origins was developed by Pendulo Studios and released by Microïds on 29 September 2016. It was released on Nintendo Switch on May 31, 2018. The game focuses on both the events that occurred centuries ago when John became an immortal and the present timeline after the first game.

Yesterday Origins was the first 3D game developed by Pendulo.

== See also ==
- Gray Matter
