= Blacksad: Under the Skin =

2019 adventure video game

- European PC box art
- Developers: Pendulo Studios; YS Interactive (assistance)
- Publisher: Microïds
- Director: Ramón Hernáez
- Writers: Ramón Hernáez; Josué Monchán
- Composer: Inon Zur
- Series: Blacksad
- Engine: Unity
- Platforms: Windows macOS; PlayStation 4 Xbox One; Nintendo Switch
- Release: 5 November 2019 (limited release); 14 November 2019; Nintendo Switch; 10 December 2019
- Genre: Adventure
- Mode: Single-player

Blacksad: Under the Skin is a 2019 adventure game developed by Pendulo Studios and published by Microïds. The game is an adaptation of the Spanish comic series Blacksad by Juan Díaz Canales and Juanjo Guarnido. It follows John Blacksad as he investigates the suspicious death of a boxing club owner.

Blacksad: Under the Skin is Pendulo's first game based on a license and its first to use fully 3D graphics. The project began in late 2016 at the suggestion of Microïds, part of the same media conglomerate that owns Blacksad publisher Dargaud.

Blacksad: Under the Skin was released for PlayStation 4, Windows, and Xbox One on 14 November 2019, although a technical error caused an unfinished version of the game to launch in Europe on 5 November. A Nintendo Switch port of the game was released on 10 December 2019. It received mixed reviews from critics.

== Gameplay ==
Blacksad: Under the Skin is an adventure game that takes place in a three-dimensional game world. Its gameplay has been compared to the work of Telltale Games, as well as Team Bondi's L.A. Noire and Frogwares' Sherlock Holmes: The Devil's Daughter. Blacksad does not feature an inventory, and, unlike in Pendulo Studios' past games, it forgoes a point-and-click interface in favor of direct character control. Gameplay is choice-based and the player's actions alter the player character's alignment with other characters in the world. The direction of the story changes based on the player's decisions. Blacksad features quick-time events, timed conversation sequences and scenes where the player must search for clues in the environment.

During investigations, John Blacksad's heightened feline senses allow the player to slow down time and perceive visual clues in their surroundings, which are then added to the player's clue index. From here, the player may combine clues to form conclusions, both to progress the main story and to solve optional side-quests.

== Plot ==
Blacksad: Under the Skin is set in New York City during the 1950s, and takes place chronologically between Blacksad: Arctic Nation and Red Soul. Its story begins when protagonist John Blacksad is approached by Sonia Dunn, daughter of boxing club owner Joe Dunn who has died suspiciously. She asks Blacksad to investigate the situation and locate the club's star fighter Bobby Yale, who has been missing since Dunn's death. According to Pendulo Studios, the game contains 30 unique characters and five previously from the Blacksad comic series: John Blacksad, Commissioner Smirnov, Jake Ostiombe, Paulie and Weekly. The game contains six possible endings.

== Development/Release ==
Blacksad: Under the Skin was developed by the Spanish company Pendulo Studios, the country's longest-running game developer by 2019. It had previously been responsible for games such as the Runaway and Hollywood Monsters franchises. YS Interactive initially assisted the team on Blacksad. According to Pendulo, the idea of adapting the Blacksad comic series into a game was first proposed by Pendulo's publisher Microïds, directly after the two companies had completed Yesterday Origins in November 2016. Microïds was owned by the same media conglomerate as Blacksad publisher Dargaud. Although Pendulo had never worked with a license before, the developer's Josué Monchán noted that the team had "been Blacksad fans for a long time" and agreed to the idea immediately. The team then storyboarded a pitch and submitted it to Dargaud and Blacksad's authors, who approved it. The project was unexpectedly announced in June 2017 and was initially scheduled for a late 2018 release. Giada Zavarise of Rock, Paper, Shotgun wrote of the announcement, "In the world of games, the news was received with a shrug. But in the comics scene, people were screaming incoherently." Gameblog's Vincent Elmer-Haerrig called the plan a "gamble" for Pendulo, as Under the Skin is aimed at "a fringe of players who are both comic-philes and video game lovers."

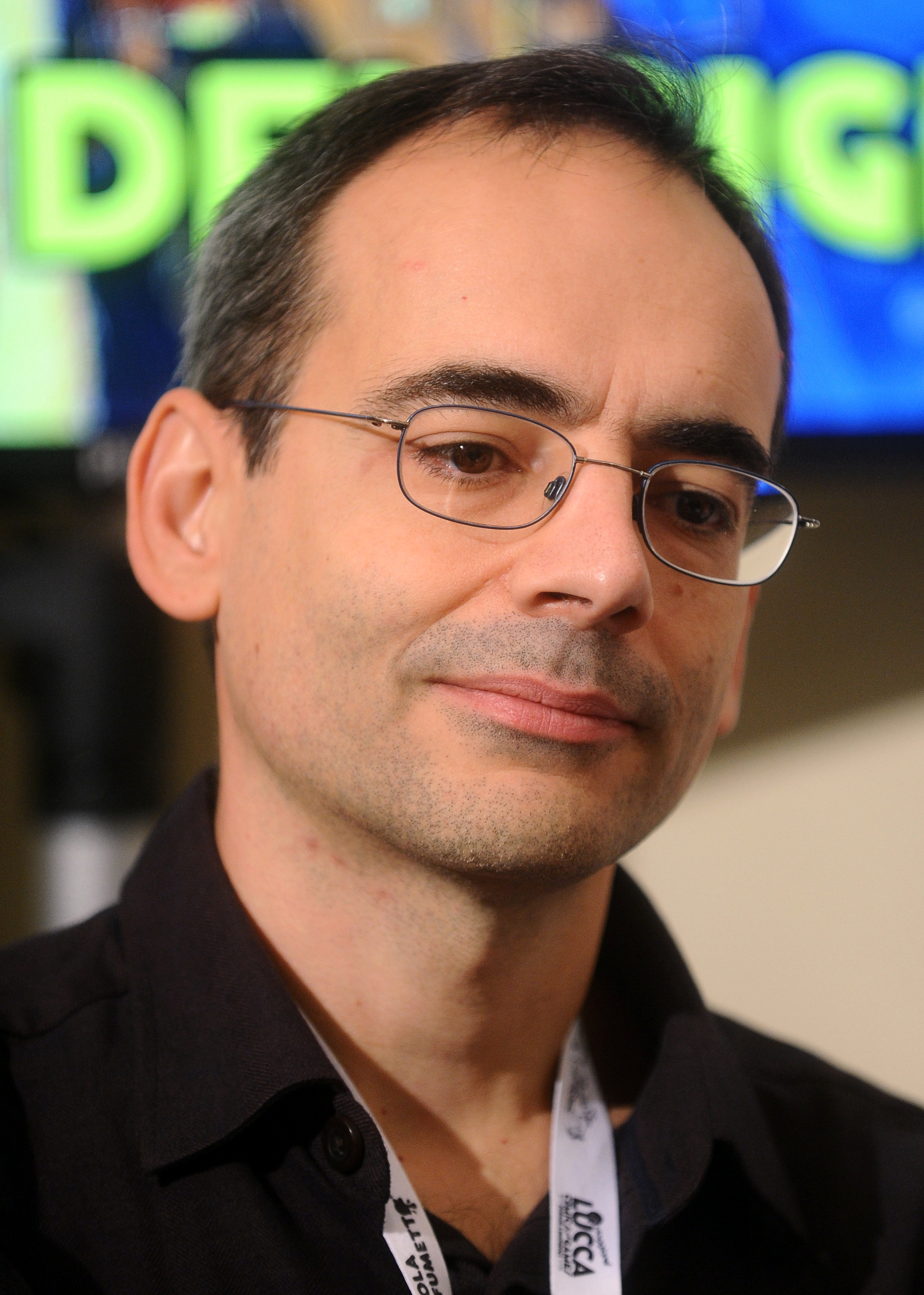
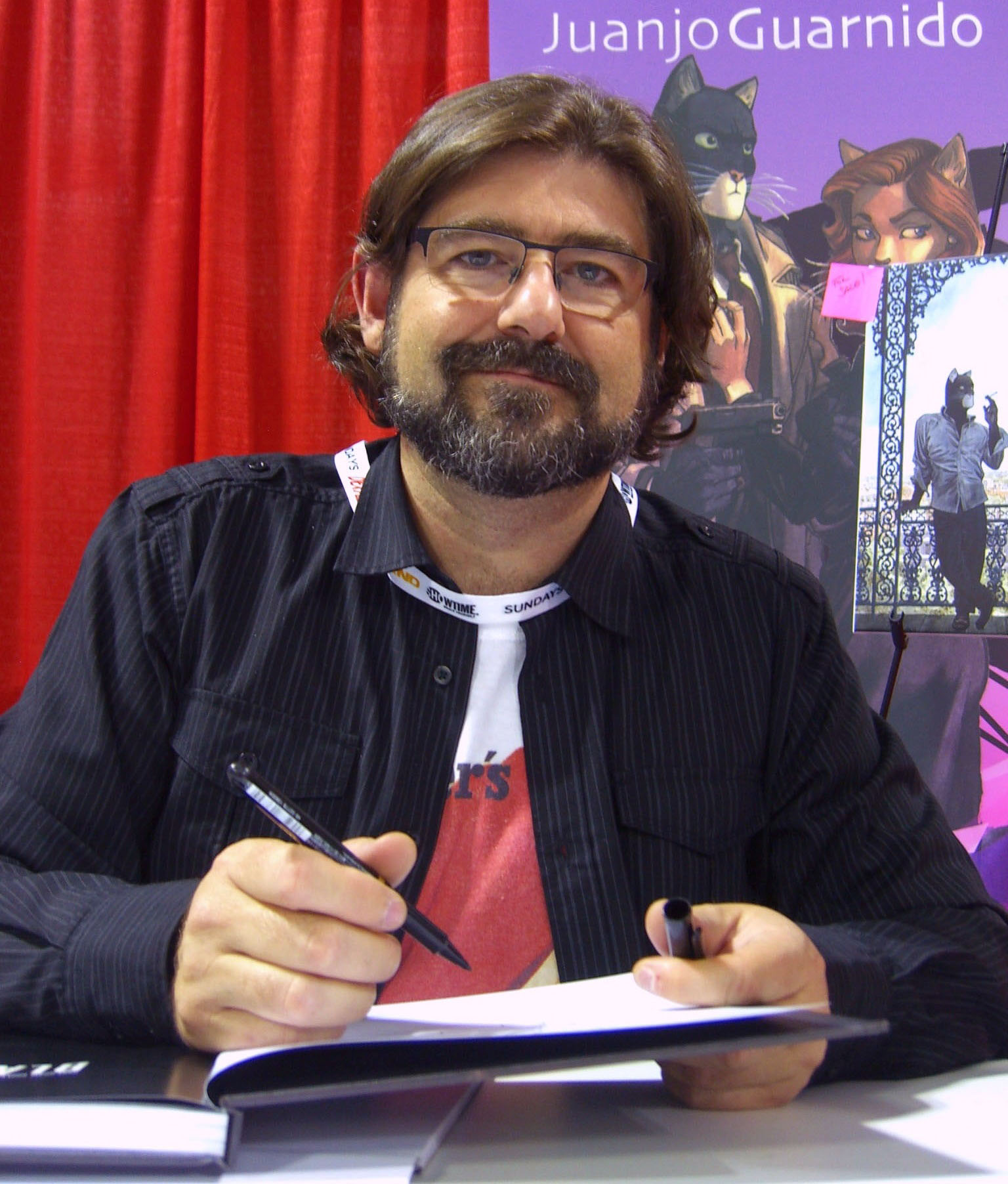
Blacksad writer Juan Díaz Canales (left) and artist Juanjo Guarnido served as consultants on Blacksad: Under the Skin, and offered feedback on the visuals, story, voice direction and other aspects of the production.

Pendulo collaborated with Blacksad creators Juan Díaz Canales and Juanjo Guarnido on Under the Skin. The developer described the pair as consultants, while Canales said that Pendulo "ask[ed] us about the plot and the visuals concepts." According to Monchán, adapting Guarnido's visual style was the team's "biggest challenge" during production. Guarnido expressed his desire for accuracy to the Blacksad comic's aesthetic, and Monchán called his help and approval "fundamental" to the team's efforts. The authors reviewed each stage of the 2D concept art and 3D visuals. Pendulo hoped to balance faithfulness to the comics' art with realism regarding budget and scheduling, as Monchán noted that it was impossible to perfectly recreate the comics' style given the restrictions of game development. Blacksad's authors also offered input on the game's voice direction. Canales requested a deep voice for John Blacksad because of the character's heavy smoking; the team hired Barry Johnson of Detroit: Become Human for the English version, and Gabriel Jiménez—voice of Hugh Jackman in Spanish film dubs—for the Spanish version.

With help from the comic's authors, Pendulo opted to create an original story not based on any particular Blacksad installment, but which still takes influence and inspiration from the existing series. Guarnido said that "the narrative is strong and we took care that it does not interfere with the stories of the comic series". The game's story is officially considered non-canonical. Its focus on sports-related corruption and the impact of television on sports in the 1950s came, according to Monchán, because Pendulo "wanted to address a topic that Guarnido and Canales have not yet touched". Pendulo's Felipe Gómez Pinilla said that the theme of corruption emerged from the team's research into the era. It became a central theme in the game; according to GameSpot's Jordan Ramée, the team intended player decisions to hinge on their interaction with corruption in society, either through acceptance or rejection.

Blacksad was Pendulo's first game to use fully 3D visuals. Lead animator Carlos Hernández told Mundo Deportivo that the game's production was "a great difficulty" for the team, particularly because of Pendulo's small size. The company numbered 17 members by 2019. Pendulo was similarly challenged by the game design: Pinilla noted that the team sought to recreate the feeling of the Blacksad comics in an interactive form, and to "find the mechanics that make you feel like [you are] investigating something" rather than simply observing an investigation. John Blacksad's heightened feline senses were an attempt to make Under the Skin's detective work unique to the Blacksad universe. Easter eggs that reference the Blacksad books were included as well. The game's direct control scheme replaced traditional point-and-click controls because the team wanted Under the Skin to suit game consoles, a concern that started during the creation of Yesterday Origins.

Under the Skin's first teaser trailer was revealed in August 2018, around the time of its showing at Gamescom. The game proceeded to appear at the 3D Wire festival in Spain that October. By February 2019, it had been in production for over two years. In April of that year, Blacksad was given a release date of 26 September 2019. Mundo Deportivo reported at the time that Blacksad was "in the final phase of development". However, in July, the game was delayed to 5 November 2019. Microïds attributed the delay to a desire for increased polish in the final product. Although the game received a subsequent delay to 14 November, its European Xbox Marketplace and PlayStation Store versions nevertheless appeared due to a technical error on 5 November. Microïds advised buyers not to play the game before the release of its planned "day-one patch", set to coincide with Under the Skin's wider release on 14 November. According to Microïds, the patch will add more sound effects to the game, fix "major bugs" and heavily increase the frame rate, among other improvements. Discussing the situation at the time, Destructoid's Chris Moyse wrote, "You have to feel for the developers in what must be a very stressful and unfortunate situation." While the game met its planned 14 November release date, Jorge Cano of Vandal characterized Under the Skin's overall rollout as "simply disastrous" and as "an example of how to do things wrong when it comes to putting a game on sale". Patches soon followed to fix some of the game's bugs and instabilities at launch.

== Reception ==
=== Pre-release coverage ===
During 2018, MeriStation placed Blacksad: Under the Skin among the year's "10 most promising" adventure games, while La Vanguardia and VidaExtra listed the game's debut trailer as one of the best to appear at Gamescom 2018. The following year, HobbyConsolas declared Under the Skin one of 2019's "most anticipated Spanish video games", and IGN España highlighted the game as one of the top graphic adventures scheduled for 2019. The editors of 3DJuegos similarly named it their 44th-most-anticipated title of 2019 across all genres and platforms, and one of their 20 most anticipated indie games of the year. According to Laura Cress of Adventure Gamers, Blacksad's display at Gamescom 2019 was "a popular draw at the annual Adventure-Treff party". The game netted a "Best Action Adventure Game" prize in the annual Gamescom Awards; The Hollywood Reporter cited it as one of the few non-sequels to win an award that year, alongside Sony's Concrete Genie and Dreams.

=== Critical reception and awards ===
Reception

Aggregate score
Aggregator	Score
Metacritic	NS: 60/100; PC: 65/100; PS4: 59/100; XONE: 69/100

Review scores
Publication	Score
4Players	85%
GameSpot	5/10
GameStar	72%
Jeuxvideo.com	13/20
MeriStation	5.5/10
PC Gamer (US)	68%
3DJuegos	6.5/10
Vandal	7/10

Blacksad received "mixed or average" reviews from critics, according to review aggregator website Metacritic.

Luke Kemp of PC Gamer docked Blacksad: Under the Skin points for being "unaware of its absurdity", arguing that its combination of animal characters with realistic and sexual imagery undermined the game's serious tone. He wrote, "The two obvious options with this game were to either play everything for laughs, or double down on the noir aspect ... Pendulo Studios appears to have chosen the latter, but it doesn't quite work." In Vandal, Jorge Cano offered strong praise to Under the Skin's story, which he found "very interesting ... from beginning to end, and quite well written". He also enjoyed the game's use of decision points and the deduction system. Cano criticized its technical problems, quick-time events, control system, visuals and high system requirements, but nevertheless said that "the charismatic universe on which it is based and its narrative virtues manage to sustain [Under the Skin], despite all the problems it has." GameSpot praised the protagonist, deduction system and the "progress" comic book styled menu, but criticized how the game was slow to play, as well as the "lack of style in the visual direction".

Reviewing the game for 3DJuegos, Alejandro Pascual found Under the Skin overly slow-paced and, before its planned patch, rife with bugs. While he praised its storytelling, atmosphere and faithful adaptation of the Blacksad comics, he found its quick-time events flawed and the game in general unpolished. The reviewer for Jeuxvideo.com similarly lauded the game's story, writing and faithfulness to the Blacksad comics, and added praise for its music and puzzles. However, she lambasted its "amazing palette of technical flaws and bugs" and found fault with its reliance on backtracking and the "illusion of choice". GameStar's Elena Schulz continued the praise for Under the Skin's story, which she called "definitely the [game's] highlight". Echoing the other reviewers, her primary complaints were with its controls, quick-time events, graphics and technical issues. She summarized, "Blacksad has technical and gameplay weaknesses, but delivers a gripping adventure story full of interesting characters."

In a more positive review, Maja Verfondem of 4Players wrote, "Blacksad is—after the installation of the Day One patch—my adventure highlight of 2019, which makes you want to read the comics again." Her primary criticisms related to the quick-time events, and to "minor graphics bugs and performance issues that even the Day One patch was unable to completely eliminate".

The game was nominated for "Best Spanish Development" and "Best Spanish Performance" with Gabriel Jiménez at the 2019 Titanium Awards. The game was also nominated for "Best Adaptation from Comic Book/Graphic Novel" at the 2020 Harvey Awards.

=== Sales ===
In November 2020, Pendulo reported that "the impact [Blacksad] has had on the market has been much greater" than Pendulo's other recent titles. The company attributed its success to the project's "more narrative, modern adventure" style, which brought it to a larger audience than Pendulo's traditional adventure game format.
