= Tintin Reporter – Cigars of the Pharaoh =

2023 video game

- Developer: Pendulo Studios
- Publisher: Microids
- Designer: José Céspedes Martínez
- Series: The Adventures of Tintin
- Platforms: Nintendo Switch; PlayStation 4; PlayStation 5; Windows; Xbox Series X/S
- Release: PlayStation 4, PlayStation 5, Windows, Xbox Series X/S; November 7, 2023; Nintendo Switch; October 17, 2024
- Genre: Action-adventure game

Tintin Reporter – Cigars of the Pharaoh (Spanish: Tintin Reporter: Los Cigarros del Faraon) is a 2023 action-adventure game developed by Pendulo Studios and published by Microids. It is based on Cigars of the Pharaoh, the fourth volume of The Adventures of Tintin. The story follows Tintin and Snowy on a worldwide adventure.

Tintin Reporter – Cigars of the Pharaoh was released for PlayStation 4, PlayStation 5, Windows, and Xbox Series X/S on November 7, 2023. A Nintendo Switch version was released on October 17, 2024.

== Gameplay ==
Tintin Reporter – Cigars of the Pharaoh is an action-adventure game that includes stealth gameplay and puzzles.

== Synopsis ==
=== Characters and setting ===
The game follows Tintin (voiced by Matthew Biddulph) and Snowy on an adventure through various locations, including Arabia, Egypt, and India. The game also features Thomson and Thompson (Mark Jane and Leslie Clack) and Professor Sophocles Sarcophagus (Leslie Clack).

=== Story ===
During a cruise on the Mediterranean Sea, reporter Tintin and his dog Snowy encounter Professor Sarcophagus, leading them to search for the tomb of the Pharaoh, Kih-Oskh.

== Development ==
Tintin Reporter – Cigars of the Pharaoh was announced in August 2022. In November 2023, an interview with Pendulo Studios' lead game designer, José Céspedes Martínez, and Charles Leveugle, product manager, revealed that the game would include many elements from The Adventures of Tintin.

== Release ==
The game was released for PlayStation 4, PlayStation 5, Windows, and Xbox Series X/S on November 7, 2023. The game was later released for the Nintendo Switch on October 17, 2024.
