= The Next Big Thing (video game) =

2011 video game

- European cover art
- Developer: Pendulo Studios
- Publishers: Focus Home Interactive; FX Interactive; Crimson Cow
- Platforms: Microsoft Windows, iOS, Mac OS X
- Release: April 21, 2011: GER: February 4, 2011; FRA: April 7, 2011; US: April 21, 2011; SPA: June 16, 2011; ITA: June 16, 2011 iOS December 6, 2012
- Genre: Graphic adventure
- Mode: Single-player

The Next Big Thing (Note: Released as Hollywood Monsters 2 in Spain, and on iOS devices worldwide as simply Hollywood Monsters.) is a 2011 comedy graphic adventure game developed by the Spanish company Pendulo Studios and published by Focus Home Interactive. The spiritual successor to Pendulo's Hollywood Monsters (1997), it takes place in an alternate-history 1940s Hollywood where real monsters portray themselves in monster movies. The game follows reporters Dan Murray and Liz Allaire as they uncover a conspiracy within the film industry. Assuming control of Dan and Liz, the player navigates the game world, converses with non-player characters and solves puzzles.

Pendulo began developing The Next Big Thing in the late 2000s, after years of fan requests in Southern Europe for a sequel to Hollywood Monsters. The company planned the project as a remake, but decided that the original game's design flaws—and what the developers retrospectively called its "male chauvinist" outlook—necessitated an overhaul. Pendulo reworked the puzzles, game structure, plot and characters, dedicating significant time to the creation of protagonist Liz Allaire. The game was produced in roughly 18 months by a team of 12 to 15 people.

The Next Big Thing received generally favorable reviews, according to Metacritic, but was a commercial bomb upon its initial release for computers. The game's performance hurt Pendulo's business relationships and forced the team to rethink its style; Pendulo moved away from comedy to create Yesterday, its first fully dramatic title. The Next Big Thing's later port for iOS saw more commercial success, but earned moderate reviews.

== Gameplay ==
Controlling Liz, the player mouses over a hotspot.

The Next Big Thing is a graphic adventure game set in a 2D environment and controlled with a point-and-click interface. Progression through the game is linear; the story is segmented into discrete scenes, each of which begins with a list of the player's goals at that moment. The player advances the plot by exploring the game world, speaking with non-player characters via dialogue trees, collecting items and solving puzzles. Most puzzles require the player to use or combine items, although minigames and conversation-based puzzles appear as well. The Next Big Thing features three difficulty modes: the lowest offers a hint system and allows the player to highlight all interactive hotspots on the screen; the middle difficulty omits the hint system; and the highest omits both.

== Plot ==
=== Concept and characters ===
The Next Big Thing takes place in Hollywood during an alternate-history 1940s, in which real monsters act in monster movies. MKO Pictures, run by the monster businessman William A. FitzRandolph, dominates this monster-movie industry. The two player characters are reporters Liz Allaire and Dan Murray of the fictional newspaper The Quill. Dan, described by Destructoid as "arrogant and self-destructive", is a veteran sportswriter recently demoted to the society pages. Liz is young, wealthy and eager to prove herself as a journalist, but, according to Marca Player, she suffers from every psychic pathology, from Asperger syndrome to multiple personalities. Gameblog declared her "borderline schizo". Liz and Dan share a mutually-hostile, frenemy relationship marked by arguments, insults and traces of romantic attraction.

The game's story is told by a narrator whose appearance Europa Press compared to that of actor Sean Connery. He breaks down the player's goals in each leg of the plot, and provides puzzle hints on the lowest difficulty setting. The story features a number of monster characters, such as the Poet of Pain, a large creature who injures himself to gather material for new poems; Big Albert, a muscular humanoid implanted with the brain of a Nobel Prize winner; Professor Fly, a mutant blend of human and fly; Krom-Ha, an undead queen from Egypt; and the Immaterial Man. Robot characters, owned by FitzRandolph, appear as well. The game borrows its premise and multiple plot elements from its predecessor Hollywood Monsters, including the Quill news agency and large sections of that game's first chapter. Liz and Dan fill the roles of Hollywood Monsters protagonists Sue Bergman and Ron Ashman, while Professor Fly, the Poet of Pain and FitzRandolph respectively replace Dr. Fly, Junior and the film producer Otto Hannover from the first game.

=== Synopsis ===
The Next Big Thing begins as Liz Allaire and Dan Murray arrive in Hollywood to cover the Horror Movie Awards, which recognize the achievements of monster actors. She interviews celebrities at the theater while he drinks alone in the car. When Liz leaves the party, she sees Big Albert sneaking into the office of William A. FitzRandolph's nearby mansion and decides to investigate; Dan remains behind. Exploring the mansion and meeting with FitzRandolph, Liz comes across two tickets to a boxing match of interest to Dan, which she promises him in exchange for his distracting FitzRandolph and clearing her path to the office. She breaks in to find Big Albert rummaging through FitzRandolph's desk, but he escapes out the window. Deducing that he plans to meet with the Immaterial Man in FitzRandolph's warehouse, Liz activates her tape recorder and walks inside, only to find Big Albert unconscious. The Immaterial Man asks for her help, and she agrees.

The next day, Liz has vanished and Dan—still hoping to get the boxing match tickets, and under threat of losing his job at The Quill—looks for clues to her whereabouts. He comes across Liz's tape recorder, which reveals that she and the Immaterial Man had hidden Big Albert inside a sarcophagus before being kidnapped by an evil scientist. With Big Albert as his only lead, Dan tracks the sarcophagus to Krom-Ha's temple. By losing his job, using the Poet of Pain's unhinged poetry to answer a Rorschach test and pretending to have only 19 days left to live, he convinces Professor Fly to use him as a test subject for an experimental teleportation device that will take him to Krom-Ha. Once there, he impersonates Amenhotep III and becomes Krom-Ha's lover until he finds a way to access the sarcophagus. He brings Big Albert back to Professor Fly, but discovers that Albert's brain is missing.

Meanwhile, FitzRandolph is shown to be in possession of the brain. Liz is now his dinner guest on his private zeppelin: she and the Immaterial Man had been imprisoned by the scientist Dr. Zelssius, one of FitzRandolph's employees. While Liz plans to escape with the brain, FitzRandolph repeatedly tells her that her mind will change within the hour. She begins to experience headaches, but manages to knock FitzRandolph out and steal the brain, returning to Dan and Professor Fly on a motorcycle. The revived Big Albert explains that FitzRandolph and Dr. Zelssius are using brain implants to control people, moments before FitzRandolph enters with his robots and Liz, revealed to be implanted, comes under his control. Back in his laboratory, Dr. Zelssius straps Dan into a chair and prepares to implant him.

With the help of Professor Fly, Dan breaks free, subdues Dr. Zelssius and captures Liz. Her implant snaps when they try to remove it, trapping Liz in her own subconscious mind. She overcomes a series of psychological problems while Dan pumps her for the tickets' location. He then, pretending to be implanted, visits FitzRandolph's headquarters to help Professor Fly free the others subjected to mind control. Dan finds the tickets in Liz's purse, and Liz escapes from Dr. Zelssius's control. It is revealed that FitzRandolph is using those implanted to help his own political campaign, in an effort to combat societal bias against monsters. Bribing the two most infamous monster actors with the tickets, Dan helps Liz shoot a negative political ad that exposes FitzRandolph, who unwittingly airs it and ruins himself. Dan and Liz's scoop gets Dan rehired at The Quill, and a flashforward shows the two as an old married couple: Dan was the unnamed narrator throughout the game.

== Development ==
Pendulo Studios began planning what would become The Next Big Thing in the late 2000s, during Runaway: A Twist of Fate's development. The company's initial idea was to create a high-definition remake of its 1997 title Hollywood Monsters, which had been a hit in Pendulo's home country of Spain. Fan requests for another Hollywood Monsters game had been ongoing for years, and Pendulo had considered the option as early as 1998, only for the project to evolve into Runaway: A Road Adventure (2001). The company dropped further hints of a sequel during Runaway's development. Pendulo's art director Rafael Latiegui summarized: "To each new game that we have been making, the reaction of the Spanish public has been the same: 'When is the next Hollywood Monsters?'" This pressure from fans was a key incentive to make The Next Big Thing. Other factors included Pendulo's desire to break away from the Runaway series, and to shorten pre-production and development of its next game by combining a proven concept with the studio's new engine technology.

Because the Hollywood Monsters source code and design document were unavailable, Pendulo writer Josué Monchan revisited the game and attempted to "reverse-engineer ... the design" over the course of two months in 2008. He came to the conclusion that the puzzles, inventory, characters and overall quality fell below current standards. Monchan also believed that the first game was "a bit male chauvinist" in its use of female characters, particularly Sue Bergman, whom he considered an ornamental, submissive woman whose agency in the plot was vastly overshadowed by that of the male lead. The team later stated that she "left a lot to be desired" as a character. In one of its first major changes to the Hollywood Monsters formula, Pendulo chose to replace the protagonists. The creators noted that they "didn't really dislike HM protagonist Ron, but ... decided to leave them [both] in the grave". The Next Big Thing gradually grew into a reimagining of Hollywood Monsters, which Latiegui called neither "a second part, nor a remake". Seeking a format that could attract both newcomers and existing fans, Pendulo built on the foundation of the first game—retaining its core ideas and opening scenes—and developed the story in a new direction.

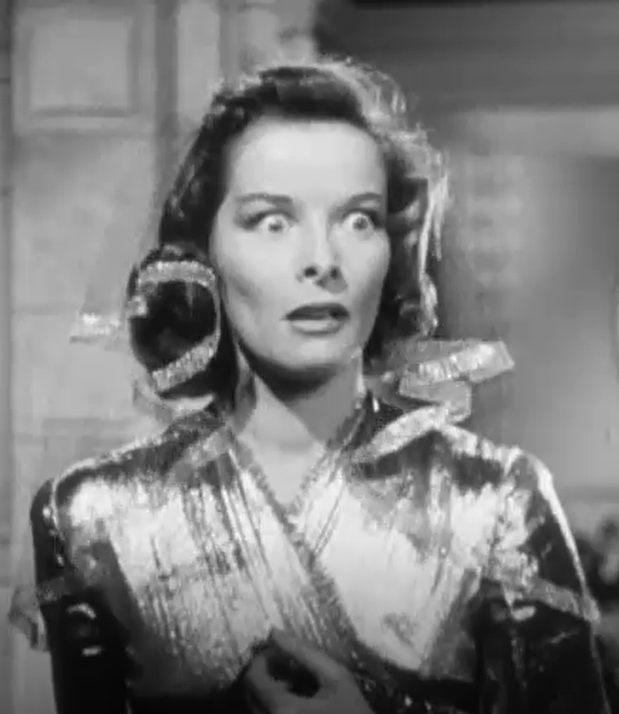
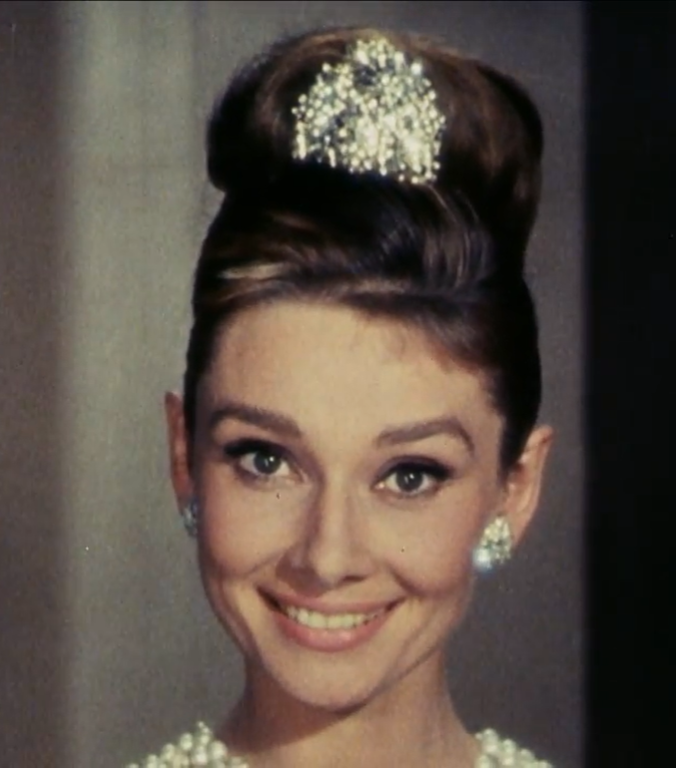
Katharine Hepburn's performance in Bringing Up Baby (left) was a core influence on Liz Allaire's character, which also drew from Audrey Hepburn's role in Breakfast at Tiffany's (right).

Monchan co-wrote The Next Big Thing with project lead Ramón Hernáez. Their script ultimately topped 500 pages in length. According to Monchan, they conceived a purposely "stupid story" and focused instead on dialogue and characterization, dedicating significant time to the creation of Sue's replacement Liz Allaire. The team wanted to write a "feminist game"; Monchan said that Hollywood Monsters' male lead "had 80% prominence and she 20% ... [but now] she is 60% and he is 40%, and she is the one who takes action". He initially struggled to find a direction for Liz's character, until Hernáez suggested borrowing from Katharine Hepburn's role in the screwball comedy Bringing Up Baby, a longtime dream of Monchan's. Monchan also drew from Holly Golightly in Breakfast at Tiffany's, from Elliot Reid (Scrubs) and Phoebe Buffay (Friends), from his ex-girlfriend, from his "craziest" real-life acquaintances and from himself. He later called Liz "the character from whom I learned the most and with whom I identify the most" across his career.

Pendulo included allusions to film history in The Next Big Thing's script and modeled the cast after celebrities and movie characters, traditions at the company. Among the films referenced in the script are Butch Cassidy and the Sundance Kid, Blade Runner, Some Like It Hot, Pirates of the Caribbean and American Beauty. William A. FitzRandolph's production company, MKO, is an allusion to the Golden Age film studio RKO Pictures. For the protagonists, Pendulo modeled Dan's appearance on actor Matt Dillon, and Liz's on actresses Charlize Theron and Scarlett Johansson. Latiegui said that they tried to give Liz "friendly features and a sexy edge" that reflected her personality. According to Europa Press, Big Albert was designed by combining football player Cristiano Ronaldo with Frankenstein's monster. The publication further reported that the Poet of Pain "unavoidably recalls" the Goonies character Sloth, and cited FitzRandolph's resemblance to reporter Miguel de la Quadra-Salcedo and to the X-Men character Beast. In 2014, Monchan noted that the game's story is itself "like the X-Men" in its metaphorical exploration of racism, via the prejudice monsters face in the game's universe.

While designing The Next Big Thing, Pendulo scrapped Hollywood Monsters' inventory system and all of its puzzles. The creators felt that the inclusion of "200 items in the inventory" at once had aged poorly, according to Monchan. They revised the puzzles partly to show the studio's growth since the 1990s, and, according to Pendulo, to offer a fresh experience to players of the original. In response to market demands, the company intentionally lowered the game's difficulty—part of a yearslong trend for its titles. Pendulo later stated that "the commercial decline of adventure [games], along with the advent of casual gaming and mobile platforms, led to ever easier adventures being asked of us". The designers also moved away from Hollywood Monsters' nonlinear gameplay structure, which they said had caused "stagnation" for players. Instead, Pendulo tried to streamline the gameplay and increase the speed of the player's progression, to create "the feeling that a lot of things are happening at a frenetic pace". The team nevertheless continued to use what Monchan called the "traditional" adventure game format, in contrast to then-recent competitors such as Heavy Rain and L.A. Noire.

Production of The Next Big Thing lasted roughly 18 months, having started in the final months of Runaway: A Twist of Fate's creation. According to Latiegui, the game was made by a team of 12–15 people, most of whom had worked at Pendulo since Runaway 2: The Dream of the Turtle. He called it a tight-knit group wherein "the level of trust and partnership is very high". They developed The Next Big Thing on an upgraded version of A Twist of Fate's engine, and graphics were a key focus. Pendulo saw graphical quality as a major selling point for its titles; Monchan later argued that Runaway owed its success in large part to its visuals. The company billed The Next Big Thing as the first 1080p graphic adventure game. Latiegui said that supporting the resolution caused development problems, but that it offered "much more freedom" to the artists. For the art direction, Pendulo maintained what Latiegui dubbed the company's "trademark" 2.5D style—originally created for Runaway—that draws from comic books and animated cartoons. The game employs toon shading and, as with the Runaway trilogy, pre-rendered 3D characters.

=== Promotion and distribution ===
The Next Big Thing was first announced by Pendulo Studios and publisher Focus Home Interactive in April 2010, and it initially lacked a release date. That November, Focus Home scheduled the game for March 2011. The Next Big Thing debuted in Germany on February 4, 2011. Releases followed in France on April 7 and in the United States on April 21. As was common for Pendulo titles at the time, the Spanish version came after the game's international debut. It appeared on June 16, a launch date shared with the Italian edition. The Spanish version, published by FX Interactive, was bundled with the original Hollywood Monsters.

During the lead-up to The Next Big Thing's release, Pendulo did not publicly tie the game to Hollywood Monsters. Early previews from publications such as Jeuxvideo.com and 3DJuegos called the games similar, but Roberto García of Spain's MeriStation wrote that "from Pendulo Studios the answer was always silence" regarding the connection. Micromanía reported in early 2011 that the creators had declared them "two completely different games". Nevertheless, after The Next Big Thing's release outside Spain, Rafael Latiegui told MeriStation that the game's "real title" was Hollywood Monsters 2. The title had not been viable for the international version, he said, because Hollywood Monsters had never been distributed outside Southern Europe. The game was renamed Hollywood Monsters 2 for its launches in Spain and Italy.

In November 2012, Pendulo and publisher Bulkypix announced an iOS version of The Next Big Thing, under the name Hollywood Monsters. The developer had seen success with its first iOS title, Yesterday, earlier that year. The Next Big Thing's port was created as part of a push by Pendulo to bring its back catalog to iOS devices, in an attempt to weather financial problems. It debuted in late 2012.

== Reception ==
Reception

Review scores
Publication	Score
4Players	69%
Destructoid	7.5/10
Eurogamer	7/10
Gamekult	7/10
GameSpot	6/10
GameStar	80/100
Jeuxvideo.com	16/20
Micromanía	93/100
PC Games (DE)	8/10
MeriStation	8.5/10
Marca Player	8.5/10
Gameblog	4/5

The Next Big Thing earned "generally favorable reviews", as calculated by Metacritic. HobbyConsolas reported that it was one of the highest-rated Spanish-made games on Metacritic by 2017.

In Germany, The Next Big Thing received largely positive reviews from PC Games' Patrick Schmid and GameStar's Patrick Lück, while Jan Wöbbeking of 4Players was disappointed with the game. All three reviewers faulted the game's brevity and low difficulty.

Reviewers praised its graphics, characters, story and animations, while some criticized the puzzles, depending on the reviewer they were viewed as too easy or too "far-fetched" (Destructoid).

In Spain, The Next Big Thing was nominated in four categories, including Best Game, at the 2011 annual awards held by the Asociación de Desarrolladores de Ocio Interactivo Digital. It came away with the prizes for Best Sound, Best Graphics and Best Script. The game's four nominations at Spain's National Gamelab Videogame Industry Awards, meanwhile, resulted in four losses to Castlevania: Lords of Shadow.

=== iOS port ===
Reception

Review scores
Publication	Score
HobbyConsolas	88/100
Pocket Gamer	6/10
TouchArcade	4/5
Slide to Play	2/4

Metacritic characterized reviews for the iOS port, Hollywood Monsters, as "mixed or average". In 2013, it was nominated for the "Excellence in Storytelling" prize at the International Mobile Gaming Awards, but lost to The Walking Dead.

David Wolinsky of TouchArcade praised Hollywood Monsters' production values and called it a "rock-solid and fun adventure", although he found its comedy "hit-or-miss" and encountered crash issues not present in the computer version. Writing for HobbyConsolas, David Alonso Hernández hailed the new touchscreen interface as a "great fit" and arguably a better match than traditional point-and-click controls. He enjoyed the writing, art and puzzles; his biggest complaint was with the loss of the computer version's Spanish-language dub. Conversely, Harry Slater of Pocket Gamer and Brittany Vincent of Slide to Play both called the new touch controls "fidgety" and imprecise, and dubbed the puzzles illogical. The two reviewers saw Hollywood Monsters as a largely missed opportunity, with an interesting premise bogged down by poor execution.

=== Sales ===
According to Josué Monchan of Pendulo Studios, The Next Big Thing commercially bombed upon its initial release for computers. He attributed its failure to several factors, including the "horrible" title and the limited cultural relevance of its monster-based story circa 2011. It was widely pirated in Spain, where sales and illegal downloads of the game were equally matched not long after its release. Nevertheless, Pendulo could not fully determine why the game had underperformed, and in part blamed poor timing. Its low sales hurt the studio's business opportunities, even in its core market of Europe; Monchan said that Pendulo's publisher lost faith in the team afterward. Pendulo reacted by rethinking its development process and creating its first fully dramatic game, Yesterday.

Although the computer version was a commercial failure, Monchan said that The Next Big Thing's iOS port saw much greater success. He called it a "moderate hit" on the platform, and noted that it had out-earned the computer release as of December 2014. Its success was validating to the game's creators, Monchan remarked, because it led them to believe that The Next Big Thing's poor initial sales were caused by business mistakes rather than the game's quality.

== See also ==
- Deponia
- The Book of Unwritten Tales
