= Hollywood Monsters (video game) =

1997 video game

- Original Spanish box art
- Developer: Pendulo Studios
- Publishers: Dinamic Multimedia; FX Interactive (re-release)
- Platform: Microsoft Windows
- Release: ESP: December 1997; ITA: 1998
- Genre: Graphic adventure
- Mode: Single-player

Hollywood Monsters is a 1997 graphic adventure game developed by Pendulo Studios and published by Dinamic Multimedia. It takes place in an alternate-history 1950s, where the creatures from Golden Age monster movies are played by real monsters who lead otherwise normal lives. Controlling reporters Sue Bergman and Ron Ashman, the player seeks to unravel a mystery surrounding the murder of Frankenstein's monster. In the process, the player undertakes a globetrotting journey to locations like Transylvania and Egypt, while solving puzzles and interacting with characters such as Count Dracula, the Invisible Man and the Mummy.

Development of Hollywood Monsters began at Pendulo in mid-1994. The company sought to heavily improve its design practices, graphics production and engine technology over those of its first game, Igor: Objective Uikokahonia (1994). While Igor had involved six people, Hollywood Monsters required roughly 40 contributors, most of them outside contractors. Pendulo's goal was to create a traditional adventure game with nonlinear gameplay and difficult puzzles. At the request of Dinamic, the team worked with Spanish new wave group La Unión to create a theme song for Hollywood Monsters. After a challenging development cycle that lasted two-and-a-half years, the game was released in Spain during December 1997.

The game drew attention in Spain as a major release from the country's small game industry, which had collapsed after the golden age of Spanish software. Spanish publications cited it as evidence that domestic games were maturing; listeners of the popular radio program Game 40 voted it the best Spanish-made game of 1997. In Spain, Hollywood Monsters sold 250,000 units and helped to establish Pendulo as an important developer. However, the game's planned English version was never released, as Pendulo failed to find publishers beyond Southern Europe. The game has retrospectively been labeled a "classic" by Spanish outlets, and as one of the country's greatest graphic adventure games. Longstanding fan demand led to the spiritual successor The Next Big Thing (2011), named Hollywood Monsters 2 in Spain.

== Gameplay ==
As Sue, the player highlights the "Look" option and the manor door.

Hollywood Monsters is a graphic adventure game in which the player collects items, converses with non-player characters and solves puzzles. The player maneuvers the player character through the game world via a point-and-click interface, mousing over the screen and selecting hotspots with which to interact. At the bottom of the screen, a pop-up menu allows the player to pick one of seven actions, including "Talk" and "Look", and mouse over an appropriate hotspot, such as a door or character. This creates a verb-noun combination in the message line at the bottom of the screen; "Look door" or "Talk Joseph", for example. The player may then execute the action with a button press. As an example, executing "Talk Joseph" will begin a dialogue tree. An eighth action—"Go", for moving the player character—is automatically enabled when no other action is chosen.

Hollywood Monsters features a nonlinear system of progression, although the player character cannot die or reach a dead-end state. After the opening sequence, the player may travel to most of the game's areas unimpeded. The game contains roughly 50 characters and 120 collectible items. Once taken, items are stored in a pop-up inventory, and may be combined with each other to create new objects. The player employs items from the inventory to solve puzzles; for example, giving a glass of punch to a doorman as a distraction. Other types of puzzles in Hollywood Monsters include those based on timed action, on conversations, on pixel hunting and on repeating the same action multiple times.

== Setting and story ==
Hollywood Monsters takes place in an alternate-history 1950s, where the monsters from Golden Age monster movies exist in the real world and live everyday lives. These characters work in Hollywood as actors. Movie monsters recreated in the game include the Mummy, the Invisible Man, the Wolf Man, Count Dracula and Frankenstein's monster. Hollywood Monsters' portrayal of Hollywood has been described as a parody, and the game directly lampoons famous films such as the 1931 Frankenstein starring Boris Karloff.

As the game starts, reporter Sue Bergman of The Quill sets out to cover the Film Academy Awards Ceremony for Monster Actors, held in Hollywood. The event is a major gathering of Hollywood's monster talent at the residence of film producer Otto Hannover; Sue's goal is to interview the attendees. There, she notices that Frankenstein's monster ("Frankie") is distressed and searching for the Invisible Man, so she attempts to interview him. However, Sue is then kidnapped and Frankie is cut apart. The following day, Quill reporter Ron Ashman learns that Frankie and Sue have disappeared. He returns to Hannover's residence to look for evidence, after which he attempts to find Sue and revive Frankie. It is revealed that Frankie's body parts were hidden inside the trophies given to the previous night's winners: the Mummy, the Wolf Man and Count Dracula. As Frankie had witnessed Sue's kidnapping, he must be reassembled to solve the mystery.

Ron proceeds to undertake a journey around the world. The Mummy resides in Egypt, while Dracula lives in Transylvania's Mountains. Other visitable locations include Switzerland, Scotland and Australia. Ron completes a series of favors to obtain the trophies from their owners, such as aiding in Count Dracula's attempt to lose weight. In a Swiss lab, Ron rebuilds Frankie, who reveals that he had overheard a plot by Hannover and his associate Dr. Karloff against Hollywood's monster actors. The pair hopes to replace them with body doubles that can be easily controlled. Ron returns to Los Angeles and helps Sue to escape from Hannover's captivity, but the pair is soon ambushed by the producer and Dr. Karloff. The villains explain that the real monsters have already been replaced, as they had grown independent and had increased their fees; their doubles are mindless servants. Ron ultimately defeats Hannover and, alongside Sue, breaks the story of his plan and frees the real monsters.

== Development ==
=== Origins ===
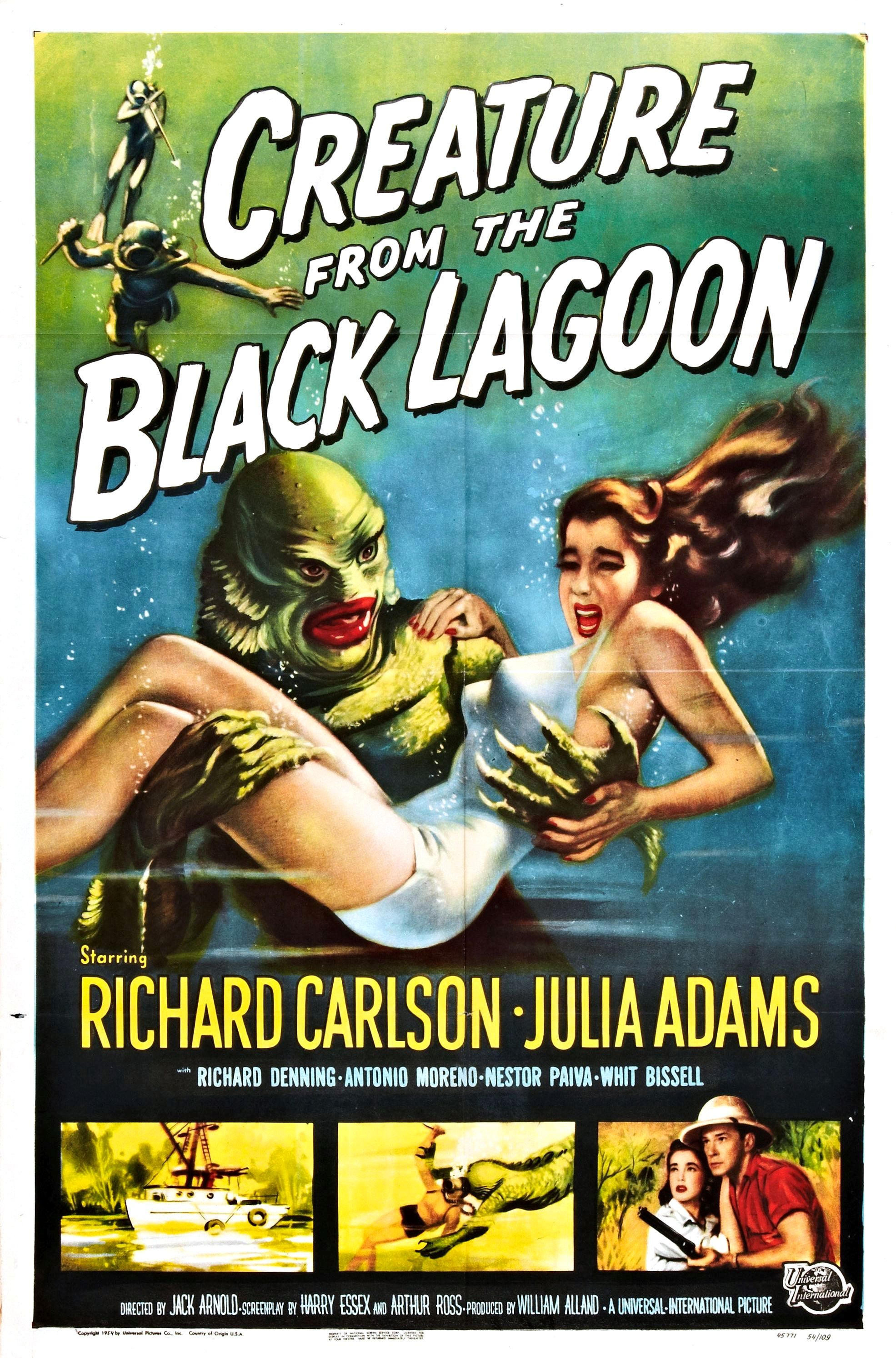
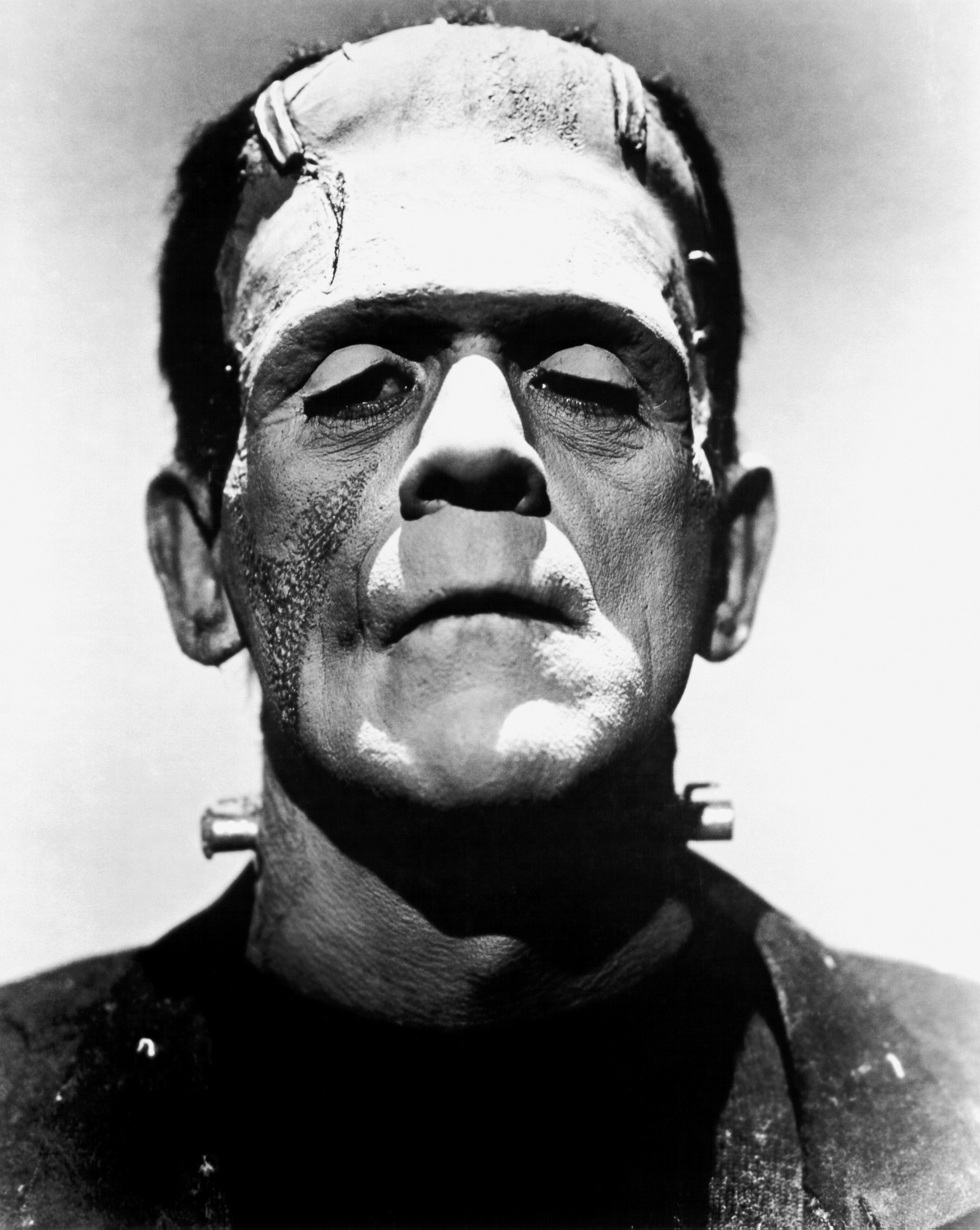
Hollywood Monsters was inspired by monster movies from the Golden Age of Hollywood, like Creature from the Black Lagoon and the work of Boris Karloff (right).

Spanish developer Pendulo Studios began Hollywood Monsters in mid-1994, directly after the launch of Igor: Objective Uikokahonia, the company's debut adventure game. Pendulo had announced plans for another adventure title before Igor's release; art director Rafael Latiegui said that it was very clear to them that they were going to make more games in the genre. Because co-founder Miguel Angel Ramos had left the team after its first project, the company's three remaining core members—Latiegui, Felipe Gómez Pinilla and Ramón Hernáez—gathered to brainstorm their second game. The trio sought to diverge from the design process used in Igor, whose whole production Latiegui later called "absolutely amateurish".

The central idea upon which Hernáez, Pinilla and Latiegui agreed was to make a "classic" adventure game, including a high level of interactivity, a visual look akin to animated films, a comedic tone and a lack of player death. Hernáez and Latiegui disliked the trends in graphic adventure games at the time, especially what Hernáez saw as an overreliance on cutscenes. Pendulo "wanted to run away from anything like an interactive movie", according to Pinilla. For the plot, the team conceived a story about movie monsters from the Golden Age of Hollywood, set around the 1940s and 1950s. Pinilla said that the designers "had the idea of going against all the preconceived notions" in the public mind about such characters. Dinamic Multimedia jumped at the chance to publish the game, redoubling its efforts to sign Pendulo after its failed bid on Igor.

Pendulo's co-founders developed the Hollywood Monsters script full-time for between three and six months. This process was collaborative: Pinilla noted that the three leads held equal weight in decision-making. The script ultimately detailed all of the puzzles, dialogue, characters, areas and objects set to appear in the game. Pendulo opted for a "very open, non-linear" design that emphasized player freedom, according to Latiegui. He, Pinilla and Hernáez also purposely increased the difficulty of Hollywood Monsters' puzzles compared to those in Igor: they saw their first title as overly short and easy, and hoped to remedy these issues in their next game. Hernáez cited the then-new project's large size as another aspect of its increased difficulty. The team estimated an average playtime of around 100 hours for Hollywood Monsters, according to PC Manía.

=== Production ===
Pendulo began developing Hollywood Monsters with the same game engine used by Igor: Objective Uikokahonia, a project coded in Pascal. However, the team's concerns with engine quality led to two full rewrites of Hollywood Monsters' underlying technology during production. After finishing Igor, Pendulo upgraded that title's codebase for use in the developer's future projects. This new version employed protected mode and offered support for voice-overs, enhanced scrolling, a 320x200 screen resolution and other features. Nevertheless, competing adventure games began to outpace Pendulo's older code, according to Ramón Hernáez. In response, the team chose to rewrite the engine again, which resulted in the final version used in Hollywood Monsters. The engine that ultimately shipped with the game, built to support SVGA and a resolution of 640x480, was coded from the ground up in C. In 1997, Felipe Gómez Pinilla summarized that "quite a lot of time" had been dedicated to engine development for Hollywood Monsters.

As with the engine and game design, Pendulo "started from scratch" in the creation of Hollywood Monsters' animated graphics, according to Pinilla. The company began production of the visuals by concepting the environments and key objects, while seeking an art style that suited the team's goals. MeriStation's Jordi Espunya reported that Pendulo settled on a stylistic direction inspired by Spanish comics, in particular their use of esperpento and satirical imagery. All backgrounds, characters and other art assets were designed on paper first, then realized digitally. The developer hired graphic artists and background painters to fill out the art staff as production ramped up. Including the voice cast, roughly 40 people contributed to Hollywood Monsters, most of them outside contractors. Hernáez said that managing the large number of contributors was the "most important change" to Pendulo's development process since Igor, which had involved six people. Hollywood Monsters' backgrounds took roughly one year to complete. As the art team worked on the backgrounds, it added unplanned visual red herrings for the game's puzzles; Rafael Latiegui noted that Pendulo was "amused by the idea of getting people a little dizzy with some false trail[s]".

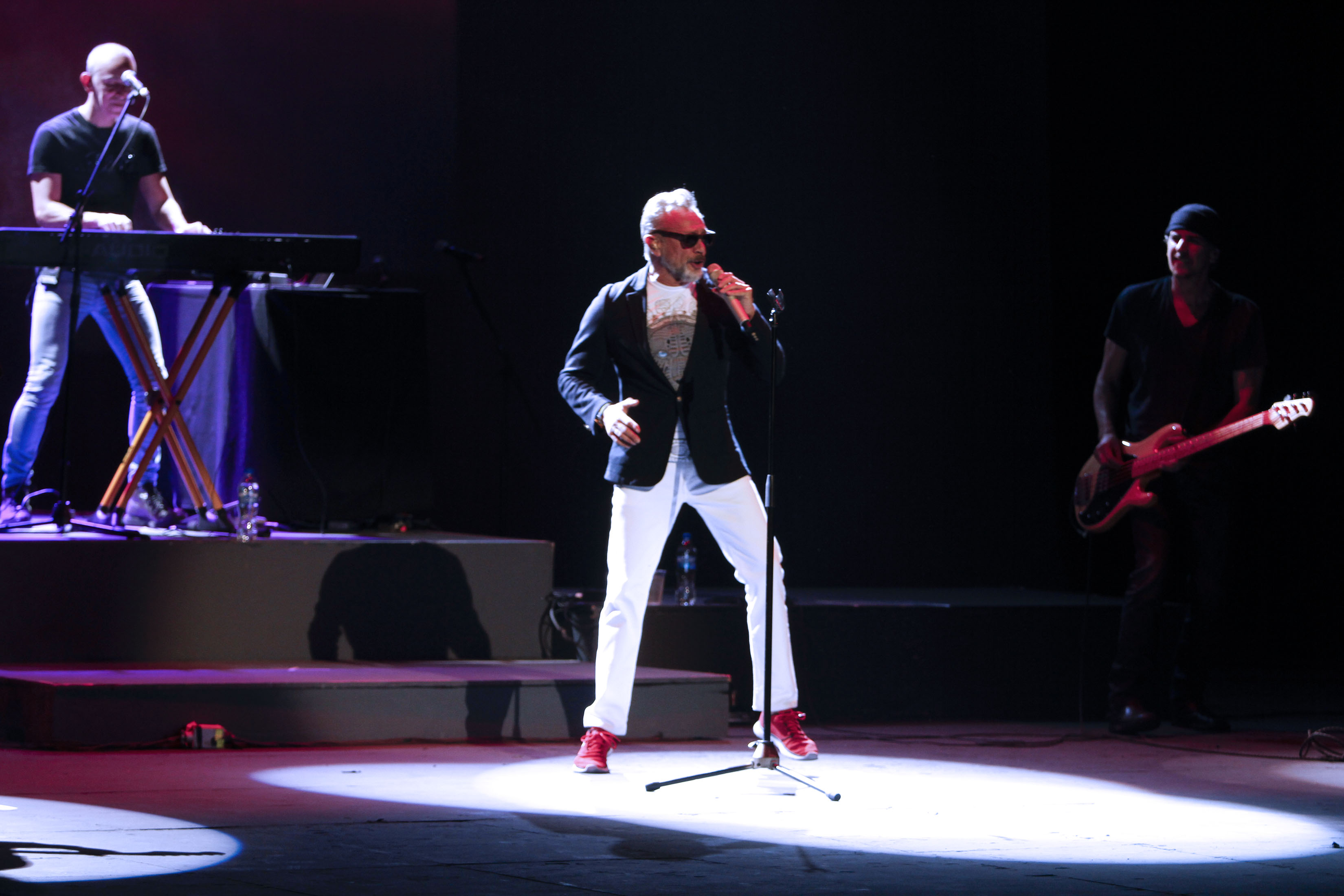
The Spanish new wave band La Unión (pictured in 2015) contributed the theme song to Hollywood Monsters.

During development, Dinamic Multimedia suggested a plan to hire a well-known band to compose music for the game. Pendulo was uncertain at first about whom to contact, but ultimately settled on the Spanish new wave group La Unión. According to Latiegui, the team "thought that [La Unión] could do a good job and that their style fit the game very well". Dinamic subsequently secured a deal with La Unión's record label, Warner Music Group, on the condition that Hollywood Monsters advertised the band's next album. As a result, La Unión composed the game's main theme, "Enigmas". Latiegui said in late 1997 that the collaboration had gone smoothly and that La Unión had "got[ten] along very well" with the team. In 2002, La Unión similarly recalled that working on Hollywood Monsters had been "a very fun experience", and reported that it was pleased with the results of the collaboration.

In retrospect, Pendulo labeled Hollywood Monsters a difficult project. The team found it to be a significantly greater challenge than Igor had been, and reported that resources were tight during production. It ultimately required a long production cycle of around two and a half years. Pinilla told Game 40 that development would have gone faster with more contributors, but that it was impossible to have more people. Spain's game development industry had collapsed after the golden age of Spanish software in the 8-bit era: Francisco Delgado of Micromanía cited Hollywood Monsters as one of the few Spanish-made games under production in 1997. While Latiegui was hopeful that Spain's fortunes were turning around, Hernáez remarked that it remained "quite far from countries like England, France or the United States." According to Espunya, there was a consensus in 1997 that Spanish adventure game development had no future, although he saw Hollywood Monsters as a hopeful sign.

== Distribution and sales ==
Dinamic Multimedia first published Hollywood Monsters in Spain during December 1997. It launched at a low price point of 2,995 pesetas (€18), made possible via inexpensive packaging and the use of a WinHelp file to replace much of the manual. While there were doubts in Spain about the sales potential of graphic adventure titles at the time, Rafael Latiegui noted that his company believed Hollywood Monsters' low cost and "high quality" would spread the game via word of mouth. The plan ultimately worked, and the title became a hit. Spanish retailer Centro Mail still reported Hollywood Monsters as its fourth best-selling computer game during the first half of May 1998. It continued to hold in the store's top 10 consistently through May, June, July and the first half of August. The title's 1998 Italian release was similarly popular, according to Latiegui, and Dinamic debuted a second edition of the game in Spain during May 1999. David Navarro of MarcaPlayer wrote that Hollywood Monsters' performance in Southern Europe was "a success comparable to the best in the genre".

Around the time of the game's launch in Spain, Latiegui told MeriStation that game development in his country "is not profitable unless it can be amortized beyond our borders". Although Igor: Objective Uikokahonia had failed to break into the international market, Pendulo had intended Hollywood Monsters from the start to reach a global audience. Felipe Gómez Pinilla noted that the newer game had been developed with English as its primary language; the Spanish-language dub was still in production by October 1997. However, because of a lack of interest from publishers, Pendulo was unable to secure a release for Hollywood Monsters in the United States. In 2000, Latiegui explained that the game was released in the worst moment in time for adventure games and the companies didn't want to risk their money. Ultimately, Pendulo launched Hollywood Monsters only in Spain and Italy, which continued the company's lack of global market success.

In 2002, Hollywood Monsters was included as part of El Mundo's 2002 "Los Mejores Videojuegos del Mundo" (MVM) collection, games that the newspaper included with its Sunday edition as optional purchases for €5 each. The paper had incorporated Igor into a similar promotion during 1998. Because Dinamic Multimedia had gone bankrupt since the debut of Hollywood Monsters, Pendulo partnered with FX Interactive for the re-release, which came in a special case with a set of stickers. Pendulo noted that fans had "for some time ... been insisting on the possibility of making a collector's edition of Hollywood Monsters"; the game had become difficult to find in Spain since the closure of its original publisher. The 2002 MVM collection was a success: combined sales of its 10 games, including Hollywood Monsters, reached one million units. FX subsequently brought the game back to store shelves as part of its budget-priced "Premium" line in mid-2002. The following year, Spain's GameLive PC reported that Hollywood Monsters was still "sell[ing] well six years after its launch".

According to HobbyConsolas, lifetime sales of Hollywood Monsters in Spain alone totaled 250,000 units by 2011. A writer for MarcaPlayer summarized it at the time as "one of the most played and best-selling adventures in Spanish software" history.

== Reception ==
Reception

Review scores
| Publication | Score |
|---|---|
| Micromanía | 88/100 |
| PC Top Player | 81/100 |
| PC Manía | 89/100 |
| Sólo Juegos | 86/100 |
| Just Adventure | B− |
| MeriStation | 8/10 |

Hollywood Monsters drew attention in Spain as a major release from the country's struggling game industry. PC Manía's Jaime Bono and PC Top Player's Daniel Melguizo both cited the project as evidence that Spanish games were coming of age; the latter compared it to the successful PC Fútbol in this regard, and highlighted Hollywood Monsters' technical superiority over domestic competitors like Dráscula. Similarly, David E. Garcia of Micromanía hailed the game as Spain's "best graphic adventure ever", and as the country's first "graphic adventure able to rub shoulders with the big ones". The game often attracted comparisons to LucasArts' Maniac Mansion. Hollywood Monsters won the 1997 "Best Spanish Game" award from the radio program Game 40, as voted by listeners. Hosts Guillem Caballé and Manuel Martín Vivaldi likewise named it their favorite Spanish game of 1997. The former host joked that his choice was based entirely on the scene in which Ron Ashman kicks a girl holding daisies into a river.

Discussing the visuals in Hollywood Monsters, Bono and Melguizo offered praise, while Garcia wrote that the game's "presentation is simply magnificent". The reviewer for Sólo Juegos similarly complimented the graphics in Hollywood Monsters—despite the "outdated", "neglected" interface—and echoed Garcia's and Melguizo's approval of the voice acting. Conversely, Jordi Espunya of MeriStation called the voices uneven and cited several "terrible" performances among the good ones; he also argued that the graphics, although above average, were inferior to those of foreign titles like The Curse of Monkey Island. Regarding the puzzles, César Otero of MeriStation later said that they "cause[d] schisms among adventurers, with those who defend[ed] their madness and those who condemn[ed] the absurdity of their solutions". While Garcia found Hollywood Monsters' puzzles logical, and Melguizo praised their "tight difficulty", Espunya called them frustrating and recommended the game primarily to genre veterans as a result. Sólo Juegos's reviewer fell in between: while highlighting the game's length and "many" sensible puzzles, the writer felt that certain moments "are not as logical as the game promises". In 2003, Just Adventure's Michal Necasek sided with Espunya on the puzzles, and found Hollywood Monsters' visuals "adequate" but its sound quality low. He summarized the game as "well done though not excellent".

== Legacy ==
Writing for HobbyConsolas, Clara Castaño Ruiz said that Hollywood Monsters became "a benchmark for the development of graphic adventures in Spain". The game proceeded to maintain a longstanding reputation in the country, and has retrospectively been labeled a "classic" by Spanish outlets such as Vandal, 3DJuegos, Defconplay and MeriStation. In 2001, GameLive PC declared Hollywood Monsters "without a doubt [one of] the two best graphic adventures" ever developed in Spain. In the 2010s, HobbyConsolas likewise named Hollywood Monsters one of the greatest Spanish graphic adventure games; Ruiz wrote that it was "considered one of the best point-and-click graphic adventures in history". VidaExtra and Vandal listed the game among the greatest adventure titles worldwide, while Defconplay named it one of Spain's best games in any genre by 2016. A writer for VidaExtra opined that, if the game had been released by LucasArts, its reputation as a classic would extend internationally. In 2016, BuzzFeed Spain editor Guillermo del Palacio named the scene between Ron Ashman and the girl with the daisies one of "13 mythical moments" recognizable to adventure game fans. MeriStation's César Otero recalled it as one of "the most disgraceful moments of humor in history", but nevertheless still amusing.

As a greater commercial and critical success than Igor: Objective Uikokahonia, Hollywood Monsters marked a turning point for Pendulo Studios. It has been cited by publications such as PC Actual, 3DJuegos, Defconplay, Vandal and MeriStation as the title that put Pendulo on the map. Francisco Delgado of Micromanía wrote in 2011 that Hollywood Monsters "was the game that really brought fame and the mass market to" the developer, while Xan Pita of El Mundo remarked, "Thanks to this game, ... Pendulo made a good dent in the industry." A writer for MeriStation named Hollywood Monsters the beginning of Pendulo's signature cartoon visual style, which it proceeded to carry throughout the rest of its work. Pendulo went on to become an important Spanish game developer, particularly in the adventure genre. It followed Hollywood Monsters with the Runaway trilogy—Runaway: A Road Adventure, Runaway 2: The Dream of the Turtle and Runaway: A Twist of Fate—which brought the company international success. In 2011, MarcaPlayer dubbed Pendulo "the masters of the graphic adventure". Likewise, Ruiz wrote in 2017 that Pendulo had become "synonymous with graphic adventures in Spain" and one of the country's "most important studios".

=== Successor ===
In early 1998, Rafael Latiegui left open the possibility of a Hollywood Monsters sequel if the first game's sales and reception were strong enough. He told MeriStation that "we have a lot of ideas left [over] that were not possible to put in Hollywood Monsters" because of time constraints. Pendulo Studios soon began working on a second Hollywood Monsters, but the project changed shape to become Runaway: A Road Adventure, which started to form as an idea in summer 1998. Nevertheless, Latiegui said during Runaway's development that Pendulo was still considering Hollywood Monsters 2. In 2001, he remarked that Pendulo had produced "a very fun script" for the sequel that was "full of familiar characters and others to get to know, with great humor and a great pre-design". It remained a tentative project at that time. Later in the year, Pendulo encountered serious financial trouble due to the bankruptcy of publisher Dinamic Multimedia, which hampered Runaway's initial launch in Spain. Most of Pendulo's staff was laid off following Dinamic's closure, and Pendulo discontinued all game development.

Thereafter, the developer spent a year trying to obtain the rights to release Runaway internationally. Pendulo managed to hold out and make Runaway a hit across Europe, which stabilized the company. The team then continued the Runaway series in part because of the first entry's success. According to Latiegui, the "vast majority" of those laid off returned for Runaway 2. However, fan requests for a sequel to Hollywood Monsters were ongoing throughout the creation of the Runaway trilogy. Latiegui said of the situation: "To each new game that we have been making, the reaction of the Spanish public has been the same: 'When is the next Hollywood Monsters?'" This pressure from fans became a key motivation for the team to return to the Hollywood Monsters concept. In April 2010, Pendulo and publisher Focus Home Interactive announced The Next Big Thing. Commentators from Adventure Gamers and Jeux Video noted the project's close similarity to Hollywood Monsters, and in the following year the game was retitled Hollywood Monsters 2 in Spain.

At the start, Pendulo conceived The Next Big Thing as a high-definition remake of Hollywood Monsters, but it increasingly drifted from this framework over time. Designer and writer Josué Monchan came to the conclusion that the original game's puzzle design and nonlinear structure did not hold up to modern standards. As a result, Pendulo created something that "is not a second part, nor a remake", as Latiegui explained. Rather, the team borrowed heavily from Hollywood Monsters and attempted to take its ideas in new directions. Sue Bergman and Ron Ashman were removed in favor of new protagonists: reporters Dan Murray and Liz Allaire of The Quill. As with Hollywood Monsters, The Next Big Thing takes place in a fantasy version of Hollywood where monsters act in films. The story explores the film industry's shift away from monster movies, which threatens to leave their casts out of work. Pendulo tried to imbue the game with a feminist outlook; Monchan called Hollywood Monsters "a bit male chauvinist" in retrospect. The Next Big Thing launched in the United States on April 21, 2011. In late 2012, it received an iOS release under the name Hollywood Monsters.

== See also ==
- 3 Skulls of the Toltecs
- Mortadelo y Filemón: El Sulfato Atómico
- Universal Classic Monsters
