= Runaway 2: The Dream of the Turtle =

2006 video game

- Developer: Pendulo Studios
- Publishers: Focus Home Interactive, FX Interactive
- Platforms: Windows, Nintendo DS, Wii, iOS
- Release: November 17, 2006: Windows; FRA: November 17, 2006; AU: December 6, 2006; EU: March 9, 2007; NA: March 16, 2007; ESP: March, 2007 Nintendo DS; EU: November 14, 2007; AU: September 25, 2008 Wii; FRA: November 26, 2009; ESP: March 25, 2010 iOS; WW: October 17, 2013 (Part 1); WW: October 31, 2013 (Part 2)
- Genre: Adventure
- Mode: Single-player

Runaway 2: The Dream of the Turtle is a 2006 graphic adventure game developed by the Spanish company Pendulo Studios and published by Focus Home Interactive. The sequel to Runaway: A Road Adventure, it follows protagonists Brian Basco and Gina Timmins as their vacation in Hawaii goes awry, sweeping up the two of them into a secret project by the United States military. The player controls Brian and explores the game world while collecting items, solving puzzles and interacting with non-player characters.

The game had begun preproduction at Pendulo Studios by early 2003. Runaway was a commercial hit for the company and saved it from bankruptcy, and Pendulo rehired much of its lost staff for the sequel. New employee Josué Monchan wrote the game in collaboration with project lead Ramón Hernáez. The project's scope grew ambitious and it was beset by numerous delays. It first launched in France in fall 2006. Originally a computer game, Runaway 2 was later ported to iOS, the Nintendo DS and the Wii.

Runaway 2 received mixed reviews upon release, the worst for a Pendulo title at the time. Monchan later called it the studio's worst-ever game, and said that the team heavily revised its development process for the third Runaway game, Runaway: A Twist of Fate (2009).

== Gameplay ==
Runaway 2: The Dream of the Turtle is a graphic adventure game controlled with a point-and-click interface.

== Plot ==
Runaway 2: The Dream of the Turtle picks up after Runaway: A Road Adventure, as protagonists Brian Basco and Gina Timmins go on the run with $20 million. Much of Runaway 2 takes place in flashback sequences, narrated by Brian via instant messages to his hacker friend Sushi Douglas. The story begins when Brian and Gina's vacation in Hawaii goes awry: during a plane ride, their pilot experiences health problems over Mala Island. Brian pushes Gina out of the plane with the only parachute and then crash lands in the island's jungles. A sniper seemingly shoots Gina with a tranquilizer dart as she falls; her parachute sinks into a lake. Brian awakens aboard the plane and finds that the pilot has vanished. Exiting the jungle, Brian stumbles across an American military camp near the lake in which Gina had landed. He meets with the soldiers' leader, Colonel Kordsmeier, who refuses to provide information about the parachute or the military's presence.

Brian investigates Mala Island for clues. Most of the civilian population has been evacuated by the military, but a few remain: Lokelani, a barmaid and former theatrical makeup artist; surfers Knife and Kai; and Joshua, a man who claims to have returned from an alien abduction to the planet Trantor. Brian also meets a soldier named Zachariah O'Connor who—believing Brian to be an undercover superior—reveals his assignment to escort an Afro-French scientist named Pignon to Kordsmeier's camp. Lokelani and Brian have sex, after which she uses her skills with makeup to disguise him as Pignon. Brian's disguise fools both O'Connor and Kordsmeier, and he is taken to a secured Tiki temple to activate a device called the A.M.E.B.A. Unable to look for Gina because of the military presence, Brian inspects the A.M.E.B.A. and learns that it is a teleportation device. At the same time, Brian finds a secret chamber guarded by special operatives under the command of a ruthless woman named Tarantula. He eavesdrops on Kordsmeier and Tarantula, discovering that the two are collaborators and that they have finally seen through his disguise. Brian uses the A.M.E.B.A. to reach the beaches of Mala Island and meet with Joshua, who claims that the Trantorians are behind the teleportation technology.

Brian and Joshua flee in a motorboat: Joshua believes that he is on a mission from the Trantorians, and must speak with a reclusive scientist named Professor Simon in Alaska. Outside the professor's walled compound, Joshua eats poisonous berries and forgets the password to enter. Brian searches the area and meets bear specialist Ben Wazowski and the violent, condescending Archibald. With help from the two men, he prepares a dish of sushi that counteracts the berries and restores Joshua's memory. Brian and Joshua meet with Professor Simon, who explains that the Trantorians are a scientifically advanced alien race that communicates via telepathy. Kordsmeier seeks to use their technology as a weapon. To force the aliens into complying, Kordsmeier is holding hostage a substance called Trantonite, to which the Trantorians have a special bond. Brian learns that a cache of Trantonite hidden in Palenque—left behind when aliens contacted mankind in antiquity—could ease Kordsmeier's leverage over the Trantorians. Tarantula and her men arrive to assassinate Professor Simon on Kordsmeier's orders, but Brian and Joshua escape, leaving the scientist behind. Brian's instant-message conversation with Sushi is cut short by Tarantula's attack.

After he escapes, Brian wakes up on Sushi's yacht with no memory of his arrival, as a side-effect of party drugs given to him by Sushi's friend Rutger. He learns that Sushi had gone to Palenque while he was unconscious, only to find that the Trantonite had been stolen centuries before by a pirate named Malantùnez, who had subsequently disappeared. Sushi and her friends help Brian locate Malantùnez's shipwreck and dive for the Trantonite, but he is knocked unconscious by a falling timber underwater. He dreams that he is a captive named "Brushian" aboard Malantùnez's ship. Characters from throughout the game and Runaway: A Road Adventure appear in new guises, and Brian eventually locates the Trantonite. After waking up on Sushi's yacht, rescued by a crewmember, Brian knows the Trantonite's location and obtains it on his next dive. The crew prepares to return to Mala Island, deliver the Trantonite to the Trantorians and rescue Gina. Having survived Tarantula's attack, Professor Simon reappears and promises to help. The game ends on a cliffhanger as the crew approaches Mala Island.

== Development ==
Following the international launch of Runaway: A Road Adventure, Pendulo Studios began to plan a sequel. The team had spent a year in a legal battle for Runaway's rights with Dinamic Multimedia, its bankrupt publisher, during which Pendulo had laid off almost its entire staff. After procuring the rights in mid-2002, the team had launched Runaway worldwide to great success, and Pendulo's Rafael Latiegui said that the team "wanted to immediately get [into] a video game" again. He noted that a sequel was the "quickest way" because of the groundwork already laid: Runaway had not been developed with a sequel in mind, but a large number of unused ideas nevertheless remained after the first game's release. In January 2003, PC Games reported that Runaway 2 was under consideration and had been partly storyboarded, but that it was not yet greenlit. According to Latiegui, Pendulo was waiting for the rest of the game's global returns before committing to a new title. The first game's commercial performance, combined with the team's desire to explore Runaway further, ultimately became a key inspiration to greenlight a sequel.

Runaway 2 was first announced by DTP Entertainment in August 2003, at the Games Convention in Leipzig. By that time, the game had passed the initial concepting phase and its plot was finished. Runaway 2's subtitle was revealed as The Dream of the Turtle in October 2004. For Runaway 2, Pendulo rehired the "vast majority" of those laid off due to the Dinamic turmoil, according to Rafael Latiegui.

Discussing Brian's change in appearance and personality in Runaway 2, Latiegui said that the team intended him to lose control of his life following the events of Runaway. The team had considered early in the process that Brian might discover himself to be gay in Runaway 2, according to Ramón Hernáez, to create a situation "such that he does not really know who he is anymore." Latiegui said of the final story in Runaway 2: "He very much tries to prove himself with his [new] look. He has gained a more realistic view of the world but, deep down, he is not a very commendable person. In the first game, Brian had a lot of principles and he lost a lot along the way." Hinting in 2007 at the story of Runaway 2's potential sequel, Latiegui said that "we will probably soon see a Brian who may have changed too quickly and he doesn't feel comfortable with himself."

Pendulo opted to use an upgraded version of the same game engine from the first title, which had itself used an upgrade of the Hollywood Monsters engine. The project was initially scheduled for late 2004. Because of Runaway's high profits, Pendulo was able to put its own money into Runaway 2, although most of the game's funding was derived from French investments. The company held a contest to add the likeness of a player of Runaway to Runaway 2 as a character, resulting in Camille, based on a French fan.

Runaway 2 underwent numerous delays, first to mid-2005 and then to late 2005, spring 2006 and September 2006. Discussing these setbacks at the time, Latiegui argued that it was "important for the quality of development" to take precedence over deadlines. Runaway 2 received an international release roughly 8 months before its mid-2007 Spanish launch.

== Release and sales ==
On the week ending November 19, 2006, Runaway 2 debuted at #4 on France's GfK-SELL sales charts for computer games. It placed second and sixth the following two weeks, respectively, before exiting the top 10 from December 4 through December 17. However, the game returned to #9 on the charts during the week ending December 24. Combined sales of Runaway 2 and its predecessor had reached 250,000 units in France alone by April 2009.

Runaway 2's computer version received a "Gold" certification from the Asociación Española de Distribuidores y Editores de Software de Entretenimiento (aDeSe), for sales of at least 40,000 units in Spain.

Worldwide, Runaway 2 and its predecessor together sold one million copies by April 2009. According to ABC, the Runaway series as a whole—including Runaway: A Twist of Fate—had risen to 1.5 million units sold worldwide by March 2010.

== Reception ==
Reception

Aggregate score
Aggregator	Score
Metacritic	67/100

Review scores
Publication	Score
4Players	80/100
GameSpot	5.8/10
GameSpy	2/5
IGN	7.2/10
Joystick	5/10
PC Games (DE)	76/100
PC Zone	60/100
X-Play	3/5
PC Action	78/100
MeriStation	8/10

Runaway 2's original computer release received "mixed or average reviews", according to the review aggregation website Metacritic. Josué Monchan of Pendulo Studios noted that the game was widely disliked by reviewers.

=== Ports ===
Reception

Aggregate score
Aggregator	Score		
Aggregator	DS	iOS	Wii
Metacritic	64/100	55/100	68/100

Review scores
Publication	Score		
Publication	DS	iOS	Wii
Adventure Gamers	4/5	N/A	N/A
GamesMaster	78%	N/A	N/A
NGamer	50%	N/A	N/A
Marca Player	7.9/10	N/A	N/A

Like its computer version, Runaway 2's ports received "mixed or average" reviews, according to Metacritic.

== Legacy ==
In retrospect, Pendulo's Josué Monchan called Runaway 2 "a horrible game" and "the biggest shit we've ever made". He cited his own dialogue writing as a key flaw, as "comedy is rhythm and [he] had no rhythm." In 2019, Monchan stated that he still occasionally returned to Runaway 2's dialogue to learn from his mistakes. He noted that the entire team learned from Runaway 2's poor reception to take feedback into greater consideration for its future titles, which influenced the design of the next Runaway entry. A third Runaway had been considered during Runaway 2's creation, and Pendulo unofficially confirmed that it was under development in November 2006. It received an official announcement at Games Convention in August 2007; certain outlets initially reported that Runaway 3 would be set in Japan and would take place immediately after its predecessor. The game was first shown in February 2008 at the Game Developers Conference, where its name was revealed as Runaway: A Twist of Fate. Pendulo and publisher Focus Home Interactive hoped to attract series newcomers with the numberless title, and Jeux Video reported that the game was "not the direct follow-up" to Runaway 2, but a relatively standalone project. Monchan said that Pendulo "rethought everything" about adventure game development as it created the game, in hopes of avoiding the mistakes of Runaway 2.

A new engine was adopted for A Twist of Fate that offered improved graphics, although the game retained a pre-rendered 2D visual style. A Twist of Fate tells the story of Brian's attempt to escape from an insane asylum, where he is detained due to a murder accusation against him. Unlike the first two Runaway entries, the game features Gina as a playable character alongside Brian. A Twist of Fate was first released internationally in November 2009; its Spanish version, again delayed, launched in early 2010.

Pendulo opted to temporarily retire the Runaway franchise after A Twist of Fate, although the team retained ideas for potential sequels. Latiegui explained in 2011, "After almost a decade with the saga, we needed a break." The team reported that it was particularly tired of Brian as a character. Nevertheless, Pendulo undertook a new Runaway title the following year, under the name Hidden Runaway. Unlike Pendulo's earlier work, Hidden Runaway is a hidden object game aimed at casual players. The game was released for iOS devices in October 2012.

== See also ==
- Ankh: Battle of the Gods
- So Blonde
