= Yesterday Origins =

2016 video game

- European cover for the computer version
- Developer: Pendulo Studios
- Publisher: Microïds
- Director: Ramón Hernáez
- Writers: Ramón Hernáez, Josué Monchán
- Platforms: macOS; Windows; PlayStation 4; Xbox One; Android; iOS; Nintendo Switch
- Release: November 10, 2016: macOS, Windows; WW: November 10, 2016 Xbox One; WW: November 17, 2016 PlayStation 4; NA: November 17, 2016; PAL: November 21, 2016 Android, iOS; WW: October 19, 2017 Nintendo Switch; WW: May 31, 2018
- Genre: Adventure
- Mode: Single-player

Yesterday Origins is a 2016 graphic adventure game developed by the Spanish company Pendulo Studios and published by Microïds. Both a prequel and a sequel to Pendulo's earlier Yesterday, the game follows protagonists John Yesterday and his girlfriend Pauline as they try to unravel the mystery of John's immortality. The player takes control of John and Pauline and explores the game world, solves puzzles, collects items and converses with non-player characters.

Yesterday Origins began development in November 2014. It was the first new title that Pendulo had embarked on since 2012, when financial problems had forced the company to restructure.

Reviews for Yesterday Origins were generally mixed, according to Metacritic, although its release for Xbox One won positive reviews and was among the highest-scoring Spanish-made games on the website by 2017.

== Gameplay ==
Yesterday Origins is a graphic adventure game.

== Plot ==
Yesterday Origins focuses on both the events that occurred centuries ago when John Yesterday became an immortal and the present timeline after the first game.

Having been caught by the Spanish Inquisition, John escapes with the help of Father Ginés. Ginés takes Yesterday to a noble estate, where he translates the Book of the Flesh in order to create the potion of immortality. When Ginés asks John to torture a child for the entertainment of the call, John refuses and helps him escape.

In the present day, John and his girlfriend Pauline sell a huge Japanese sculpture to Baxter, an eccentric millionaire heiress. While meeting her, John finds a book with the tattoo of the Book of the Flesh and tracks it to the author in New York. When leaving New York, John is kidnapped by Baxter's head of security and taken back to France, where he meets father Ginés, now old and decrepit, who only lives two or three weeks before dying and returning as a frail old man. Ginés begs John to read the book again to find a potion to reverse immortality. Baxter interrupts the process, planning to take the potion herself to become immortal.

However, as shown in a flashback, Pauline had swapped out the coin of judgment, one of the central ingredients. After being forced to drink the potion and being murdered, Pauline returns to life and Baxter commits suicide, not realizing Pauline was already immortal.

Yesterday reads the Book of the Flesh again, and realizes he's been immortal even before he met Ginés, instead returning as a child rather than an adult. After making the reversal potion, Ginés shoots John and then commits suicide. Pauline briefly considers drinking the potion as well, before John reappears as a baby.

== Development ==
Following Pendulo Studios' unsuccessful crowdfunding campaign for its project Day One in September 2012, the developer neared bankruptcy and entered a two-year period of inactivity. Crowdfunding had been the company's attempt to survive after it was unable to secure a traditional publisher. Pendulo's Juan Miguel Marín recalled the period as "a bad time", while Albert Garciá of La Vanguardia noted that "the future of this company was uncertain" at the time. The developer's disappearance ended in mid-December 2014, when the studio signed a deal with Microïds to create an unannounced new adventure game. Its development began "immediately", according to Pendulo. The project was revealed as Yesterday Origins in May 2015.

Pendulo attempted to make Yesterday Origins harder than its last several games, following a yearslong trend of reducing the difficulty of each successive title in response to market demands. The company's Josué Monchan estimated that the game was at least "twice as long as its predecessor". Pendulo chose the prequel-sequel format in an effort to make the game equally understandable and enjoyable for both series newcomers and players of the original Yesterday, according to Monchan.

While Pendulo had previously developed games with a proprietary game engine, Yesterday Origins was made in Unity. The team later called this "the most brutal change" in project management that Pendulo had undergone.

== Reception ==
Reception

Aggregate score
Aggregator	Score
Metacritic	74/100 (PC); 73/100 (PS4); 76/100 (XONE); 68/100 (NS)

Review scores
Publication	Score
4Players	71% (PS4); 70% (PC)
Adventure Gamers	3.5/5
Gamekult	5/10
HobbyConsolas	90/100
Jeuxvideo.com	17/20
Micromanía	85/100
Canard PC	7/10
Vandal	8/10
Igromania	7/10 (PC)
The Games Machine	8.8/10

According to Metacritic, reviews of Yesterday Origins were "mixed or average" across its PlayStation 4, Nintendo Switch and computer releases. Its Xbox One version scored higher, netting "generally positive reviews" from critics. HobbyConsolas reported that the game's release for Xbox One was one of the 18 highest-rated Spanish games listed on Metacritic by 2017.
