= Runaway: A Twist of Fate =

2009 video game

- Developer: Pendulo Studios
- Publisher: Focus Home Interactive
- Platforms: Microsoft Windows, Nintendo DS, iOS
- Release: Windows: GER: November 18, 2009; EU: November 26, 2009; ESP: March 25, 2010; CIS: July 22, 2010; WW: April 21, 2011 (Steam); Nintendo DS: EU: May 17, 2010; iOS: WW: March 28, 2013 (Part 1); WW: April 25, 2013 (Part 2)
- Genre: Graphic adventure
- Mode: Single-player

Runaway: A Twist of Fate is a 2009 graphic adventure game developed by the Spanish company Pendulo Studios and published by Focus Home Interactive. It is the third entry in the Runaway franchise. The game follows series protagonists Brian Basco and Gina Timmins as they seek to clear Brian's name of a murder. Taking control of both characters, the player explores the game world, collects items, solves puzzles and converses with non-player characters.

Pendulo designed A Twist of Fate to avoid the pitfalls of Runaway 2, a game with which the team had been unhappy. Several versions of the game were scrapped before the team settled on the final story and structure. Just like the second entry in the series, the English, the French and German versions of the game were the first available for purchase, all three of them published on November 26, 2009. The original Spanish version was subsequently published in its homeland, Spain, on March 25, 2010, featuring an exclusive special collector's edition to mollify fans annoyed by the delay, as with Runaway 2.

A Twist of Fate received generally positive reviews. Pendulo chose to retire the Runaway series after its release, citing exhaustion with the franchise. However, it was followed by an iOS spin-off, entitled Hidden Runaway, in 2012. A Twist of Fate itself was ported to iOS in 2013.

== Gameplay ==
Runaway: A Twist of Fate is a graphic adventure game controlled with a point-and-click interface.

== Plot ==
Runaway: A Twist of Fate begins six months after the events of Runaway 2: The Dream of the Turtle, with the funeral of series protagonist Brian Basco. Co-protagonist Gina Timmins is in attendance. It is revealed that, before his apparent death, Brian had been convicted and confined to a mental institution for murdering Colonel Kordsmeier, a member of the United States military and the antagonist of Runaway 2. After the funeral, Gina receives a text message from Brian, who claims to have been buried alive. Gina manages to open his coffin; inside is Brian's friend Gabbo from the mental institution. The pair leave the cemetery while dodging two gangsters who have been following Gina.

En route to someone who can help them find Brian, the two stop at a roadside diner, where Gabbo tells Gina of Brian's difficult life in the asylum and how a patient from the place named Kurgan made him suffer. The chapter begins as a flashback in the middle part of his story: Brian, having overheard his therapist inform the judge of his intent to declare Brian sane and criminally responsible for Kordsmeier's murder, decides to break out of the asylum. Gabbo, a longtime resident of the asylum, provides Brian with an escape plan, but Kurgan overhears everything and hijacks the plan. Brian does not give up, and with the help of the other patients, succeeds in resolving a part of the plan, despite the interference of the detestable Dr. Palmer. Brian eventually manages to reach the central air vent of the asylum, only to find Kurgan's decapitated body on the floor of the vent shaft.

The next day, Gina and Gabbo arrive a house nestled in the woods, where they meet with Brian's psychologist, Doctor Ian C. Bennett. Bennett explains to Gina that the call that Brian overheard was actually about Kurgan, and that he was actually convinced of Brian's innocence. Bennett also explains that the house belonged to Lieutenant Colonel Jerome D. Chapman, Kordsmeier's former second-in-command and the victim of an apparent suicide. Chapman's testimony could have exonerated Brian, and Bennett suspects that Chapman's death was really a murder committed by those who wanted to frame Brian. Eventually, the group successfully reconstructs the murder scene, determining that the killer could only have been Andrea Hickock, codename: Tarantula. Just then, Wasabi and Fatzilla shoot Bennett, but Gabbo sets off a burst of explosives, trapping the gangsters while Gina and Gabbo escape.

The scene returns to Brian's escape from the asylum. Brian and Gabbo adjust their plan to try and swap Kurgan's body for Brian, altering Kurgan's body and death scene to make the swap. Having just finished, Brian prepares to depart at midnight, only to be surprised by Dr. Palmer, who forcibly drugs him with a compound that causes violent frenzy. Brian manages to neutralize the effects of the drug and escape the asylum, setting the stage for the rest of the game.

Brian returns to New York and tries to infiltrate Dr. Bennett's apartment to find Bennett's recordings of his hypnotherapy sessions, but is hit in the face by a hobo while climbing a ladder and is knocked unconscious in the subsequent fall. Gina subsequently arrives at the apartment with the judge and shows her the hypnotherapy recordings, in which Brian relates the events that took place on Mala Island. It is revealed that Brian was able to infiltrate Kordsmeier's encampment and free the alien prisoners, who incapacitated both Kordsmeier and Tarantula before departing. The aliens returned a healed Gina and gave Brian a gift of the mysterious mineral Trantonite. Brian took remote control of Kordsmeier's body using alien technology and used his authority to replace the Trantonite with a decoy, but Tarantula was able to escape and, using the remote control device, controlled Brian's body to murder Kordsmeier. Brian experienced a psychotic break while Tarantula escaped with the decoy Trantonite and the now-broken control device. The recording ends with Dr. Bennett relating his interpretation of Brian's story as actual events that have been delusionally distorted by trauma and hypothermia; he theorizes that Kordsmeier had been corrupt and trying to steal meteoric minerals, and that Tarantula murdered him while framing a weakened Brian to cover up her own involvement.

During the viewing, the group is attacked by Dr. Palmer, who reveals herself to be Tarantula, with Wasabi and Fatzilla being her agents. She threatens to murder the judge's daughter and forces her to implicate Brian as the murderer; Gina manages to get loose and tries to signal for help, but is discovered and recaptured by Wasabi. Her signal attempt awakens Brian from where he has fallen in a dumpster; he manages to enter the Bennett apartment through the roof of the building and find Gina. The two formulate a final plan to trick Tarantula; knowing that Tarantula has managed to acquire the real Trantonite based on Brian's hypnotherapy recordings and that a buyer for the Trantonite will soon be arriving, the two set up a sting in which a impostor buyer releases sleeping gas into the apartment, knocking out all three criminals. The plan goes off successfully; Tarantula and her two henchmen are arrested and the judge declares her intent to exonerate Brian. The game concludes with Brian and Gina selling a lump of volcanic rock to the buyer for a cool $10 million; the swap is discovered after the fact, but the two manage to escape and go on the run again.

In a post-credits scene, it is revealed that Dr. Bennett survived the shooting at Chapman's house, thanks to a truly fortunate twist of fate.

== Development ==
After the release of Runaway 2: The Dream of the Turtle, Pendulo Studios unofficially confirmed in November 2006 that a third Runaway game was under development. The idea had been considered as early as 2005. Under the working title Runaway 3, the new game received an official announcement at Games Convention in August 2007. At the time, certain outlets reported that the project would be set in Japan and would take place immediately after Runaway 2. Runaway: A Twist of Fate was first shown under its full name in February 2008 at the Game Developers Conference, where the first images of the game were released. Pendulo and publisher Focus Home Interactive hoped to attract series newcomers with the numberless title, and Jeux Video reported that the game was "not the direct follow-up" to Runaway 2, but a relatively standalone project.

A new engine was adopted for A Twist of Fate that offered improved graphics, although the game retained a pre-rendered 2D visual style. A Twist of Fate was first released internationally in November 2009; its Spanish version launched in early 2010.

== Reception ==
Reception

Aggregate score
Aggregator	Score
Metacritic	79/100

Review scores
Publication	Score
4Players	70/100
Adventure Gamers	4/5
GameSpot	6/10
GameStar	86/100
Jeuxvideo.com	18/20
Joystick	7/10
Micromanía	92/100
PC Games (DE)	86%
PC PowerPlay	7/10
Marca Player	8.5/10
MeriStation	8.5/10
Gameblog	9.0/10

In March 2010, ABC reported that sales of the Runaway series—including A Twist of Fate—had risen to 1.5 million units worldwide. According to GfK, A Twist of Fate proceeded to sell another 11,348 full-price copies in Spain within roughly 18 months, at a retail price of €20. The game received "generally favorable reviews" from critics, as calculated by Metacritic. This made A Twist of Fate the site's highest-scoring Pendulo game at the time, and HobbyConsolas reported that it was still one of the highest-rated Spanish games on Metacritic by 2017.

=== Portable version ===
Reception

Aggregate score
Aggregator	Score
Metacritic	66/100

Review scores
Publication	Score
NGamer	61%
Nintendo Life	8/10
Official Nintendo Magazine	54%

The DS version received "mixed or average reviews", according to Metacritic.

== Legacy ==
In 2011, Adventure Gamers named Runaway 3 the 97th best adventure game ever released.

Pendulo opted to retire the Runaway franchise after A Twist of Fate, although the team retained ideas for potential sequels. Latiegui explained in 2011, "After almost a decade with the saga, we needed a break." Latiegui and Josué Monchan said that Pendulo was tired of Runaway's cast even during A Twist of Fate's production, and the team stated that it was particularly "fed up" with Brian as a character. Pendulo noted, "The day our team found out that the latest installment started with his burial, there was applause... which turned to grumbling at the revelation that it was a fake funeral."

The possibility of a fourth Runaway game was nevertheless considered. In May 2011, Latiegui said, "We have Brian and Gina cryogenized in the server room. Their vital signs are working correctly but, for now, they are frozen, along with 2-3 scripts from a project with the original title Runaway 4. Will we unfreeze them? Maybe, maybe not. Only time will tell." Pendulo undertook a Runaway spin-off the following year, under the name Hidden Runaway. Unlike Pendulo's earlier work, Hidden Runaway is a hidden object game aimed at casual players. The game was released for iOS devices in October 2012.

A Twist of Fate was later re-released for iOS devices. This version of the game received "mixed or average" reviews, according to Metacritic.
(1) 50/100
