= Micromanía =

Spanish computer game magazine

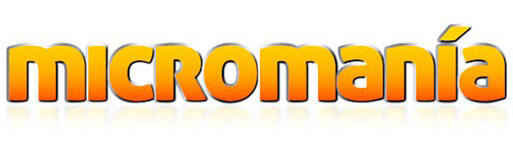

- First issue of the magazine published in 1985
- Categories: Computing, Gaming
- Frequency: Monthly
- Publisher: HobbyPress (1985–1998); Axel Springer AG (1998–2012); BlueOcean Publishing (2012–2024)
- First issue: May 1985; 41 years ago
- Final issue Number: February 2024; 2 years ago 450 (overall)
- Country: Spain
- Based in: Madrid
- Language: Spanish
- Website: http://www.micromania.es
- ISSN: 9955-8726

Micromanía was a Spanish computer game magazine. It was founded by the publisher HobbyPress, currently a subsidiary of Axel Springer SE. It was created in May 1985 and is one of the first magazines in Europe exclusively devoted to video games. It was first published soon after MicroHobby, which had been created just a few months earlier by the same publisher. The magazine in its two first periods was a major outlet supporting of the golden era of Spanish software. Micromanía celebrated its 25th anniversary in 2010. In July 2012, Axel Springer sold Micromanía to other owner, focussing its video game coverage in its other magazine, Hobby Consolas. The Micromanía team continued the printed magazine independently, published by BlueOcean Publishing, until its final issue in February 2024.

== History ==
The first issue of Micromanía was published in 1985, with new issues released monthly. The publication of the magazine has been divided into three periods, called in Spanish "Épocas". The first period lasted for three years, with 35 issues. The second period, starting in 1988, changed its physical size to adopt what became its iconic large newspaper size. The second period had 80 issues, the last one published in January 1995, the 11th year since the magazine's inception. In February 1995 the third "Época" started. The magazine reshaped itself to a normal-sized magazine. The magazine celebrated its 20 years anniversary in 2005, and its 30 years anniversary in 2014. 35th anniversary was celebrated in 2019. Amid an industry-wide decline in print magazine sales, Micromanía abandoned newsstands in June 2023, electing to exclusively retail at Game stores in an attempt to adjust the print run to the perceived paid circulation and increase its quality in the process. However, on 22 January 2024, the magazine ultimately announced that the February 2024 issue would be the last one it would publish; the issue marked the 335th of the third period and the 450th overall.

== See also ==
- Hobby Consolas
