= Broken Sword (disambiguation) =

Broken Sword may refer to:

- Broken Sword, an adventure game series by Revolution Software
  - Broken Sword: The Shadow of the Templars, the first instalment in the series
  - Broken Sword II: The Smoking Mirror, the second instalment in the series
  - Broken Sword: The Sleeping Dragon, the third instalment in the series
  - Broken Sword: The Angel of Death, the fourth instalment in the series
  - Broken Sword 5, the fifth instalment in the series
- The Broken Sword, a 1954 fantasy novel by the American writer Poul Anderson
- The Broken Sword (Kasymbek), a 1966 historical novel by the Kyrgyz writer Tologon Kasymbek
- Brokensword, Ohio, a small community in Crawford County, Ohio, United States
- "Broken Sword" (Chinese: cánjiàn) is the name of a lead character played by Tony Leung Chiu Wai in the Zhang Yimou film Hero
- Narsil, a fictional sword in J.R.R. Tolkien's books, held by King Elendil and broken by Sauron, later reforged and renamed Andúril.
