= Barrington Pheloung =

Australian composer (1954–2019)

- Born: Barrington Somers James Pheloung; 10 May 1954; Manly, New South Wales, Australia
- Died: 1 August 2019 (aged 65) Australia
- Occupations: Composer, conductor
- Years active: 1973–2019
- Spouse(s): Anita Griffin (1979 – ?) (divorced); Heather Lovejoy (? – 1 August 2019) (his death)
- Website: pheloung.co.uk

Barrington Somers James Pheloung (10 May 1954 – 1 August 2019) was an Australian composer based in the United Kingdom. He composed several television theme tunes and music, most notably for the television series Inspector Morse and its sequel, Lewis, and prequel, Endeavour.

== Early life and studies ==
Pheloung was born 10 May 1954 in Manly, New South Wales, and grew up in Sydney's northern beaches suburbs. He was born to father John Pheloung who was of Irish and English descent, and mother Adel (nee Reber) Pheloung who was of German and Spanish descent. He began playing R&B guitar in clubs, but his discovery of Bach in his late teens drew him to the classical repertoire.

In 1972, aged 18, Pheloung moved to London where he studied guitar, double bass, and composition at the Chiswick Music Centre, then part of Chiswick Polytechnic (now Brunel University), before proceeding to the Royal College of Music to study composition with John Lambert and guitar under John Williams and Julian Bream. There he also took instruction in conducting. In his second year, he received his first commission for a ballet score.

== Composer ==
Pheloung is best known for the theme and incidental music to the Inspector Morse television series, for which he was nominated for Best Original Television Music at the British Academy Television Awards in 1991. His music was also used in the sequel Lewis and the prequel Endeavour. He composed for dance companies such as the London Contemporary Dance Theatre, and for events including the opening night of the Millennium Dome. Pheloung also wrote the theme music for the BBC television series Dalziel and Pascoe.

His film work included Hilary and Jackie (1998), based on the life of the cellist Jacqueline du Pré, for which he was nominated for the Anthony Asquith Award for Film Music at the 52nd British Academy Film Awards. Other works include Truly, Madly, Deeply (1990), Twin Dragons (1992), Shopping (1994), Nostradamus (1994), The Mangler (1995), Touching Wild Horses (2002), Shopgirl (2005), Little Fugitive (2006) and A Previous Engagement (2008). He also composed the scores to Revolution Software's adventure games In Cold Blood, and three Broken Sword video games.

Pheloung's other work included music for the Sydney Opera House's Twentieth Birthday Celebrations and he contributed to the music for the film Truly, Madly, Deeply, in which he also appeared. He composed the incidental music for the first series of Boon.

In 2009 he composed the music for 1983, the concluding episode of the Channel 4 drama series Red Riding.

== Personal life and death ==
Pheloung married Anita Griffin in 1979. The couple had two children together before the marriage ended in divorce. He later married Heather Lovejoy, with whom he had two more children.

He died in August of 2019 at the age of 65, survived by his second wife and his four children. The cause of death was respiratory failure.

== Discography ==
- Red Riding, 2009
- Lewis, Music from Series 1 & 2, 2008
- And When Did You Last See Your Father? 2007
- Shopgirl, 2006
- The Magic of Inspector Morse, 2000
- Inspirations, 2001
- Hilary and Jackie, 1998
- The Passion of Morse, 1997
- The Essential Inspector Morse Collection, 1995
- Shopping, 1994
- Nostradamus, 1994
- Days of Majesty, 1993
- Inspector Morse Vol. 3, 1992
- Inspector Morse Vol. 2, 1992
- Inspector Morse Vol. 1, 1991

== Credits ==
- Endeavour, 2012–19
- Red Riding, 2009
- Incendiary, 2008
- And When Did You Last See Your Father? 2007
- Lewis, 2006–2015
- Shopgirl, 2005
- Touching Wild Horses, 2002
- Hilary and Jackie, 1998
- Dalziel and Pascoe, 1996-98
- Twin Dragons, 1996
- Saint-Ex, 1995
- The Mangler, 1994
- Nostradamus, 1994
- The Legends of Treasure Island, 1993
- Truly, Madly, Deeply, 1991
- Portrait of a Marriage, 1990
- Friendship’s Death, 1987
- Inspector Morse, 1987–2000
- What If It's Raining, 1986

== Video games ==
- Broken Sword: The Shadow of the Templars, 1996
  - Broken Sword: Shadow of the Templars – The Director's Cut (2009)
- Broken Sword II: The Smoking Mirror, 1997
- In Cold Blood, 2000
- Broken Sword 5: The Serpent's Curse, 2013–2014
