= Broken Sword 2.5: The Return of the Templars =

2008 video game

- Developer: mindFactory
- Publisher: mindFactory
- Series: Broken Sword
- Platform: Windows
- Release: 28 September 2008
- Genre: Adventure
- Mode: Single-player

Broken Sword 2.5: The Return of the Templars (German: Baphomets Fluch 2.5: Die Rückkehr der Tempelritter) is a fan-made freeware game by mindFactory, released on 28 September 2008 for Windows. It is an unofficial entry in the Broken Sword series. It explains the story between Broken Sword II: The Smoking Mirror and Broken Sword: The Sleeping Dragon. The game was in a development for eight years starting in 2000. The game was endorsed by Revolution Software.

== Plot ==
After the events of Broken Sword II, George Stobbart left for United States to take care of his dying grandfather. He returns to Paris when he receives a telegram informing that Nico Collard might be dead. He finds her alive and involved in a plot to assassinate the governor of Paris. The story later centers around the return of the Knights Templar and includes a connection to a Chinese emperor.

== Gameplay ==
Broken Sword 2.5 is a 2D adventure game played from a third-person perspective. Via a point-and-click interface, the player guides the characters through the game's world and interacts with the environment by selecting from multiple commands.

== Development and release ==
While officially the development of the game started in December 2000, actual development including programming started in summer or autumn 2001. One of the challenges encountered by the team in 2001 was when the entire game had to be converted from QBasic to Visual C++. In July 2002, the release was announced for sometime between January and summer 2003. In June 2003, the release was delayed from end of 2003 to fourth quarter of 2004. A playable tech demo was released in September 2004. A standard demo version was released in September 2006. The full game was released on 28 September 2008.

An English-language voice pack was released on October 26, 2010. Compatibility with ScummVM was added in 2016.

== Reception ==
Reception

Review scores
Publication	Score
Adventure-Treff	5/5
iDNES.cz	10/10
Just Adventure	B

Previews

In a March 2004 preview, PC Action called the music great. Playing the demo version, they were impressed and said it's hard to believe it's a fan project. Previewing a 2006 demo version, Adventure-Treff liked the graphics and audio, and said the voice acting is professionally done, only with one exception. In a 2008 preview of a beta version, PC Games said the developer skillfully mixes old and new elements and locations together. The puzzles were noted as logical and relatively easy.

Reviews

Just Adventure called the gameplay "smooth, expert and great fun". They criticized the game's short length since the story stops abruptly. Hardcore Gaming 101 praised the dialogue, graphics, and music but criticized the look of the computer generated cutscenes, the rushed plot, and puzzles involving pixel hunting. Chip liked the graphics and voice acting, and called the story exciting, although they noted some clunky narrative moments. The puzzles were remarked as too easy for adventure game veterans. GameStar gave a positive review and said the puzzles are mostly logical and not particularly difficult. Adventure Gamers wrote: "The production values of this game are on par with the original two commercial releases, with detailed graphics and a full orchestral score."

== See also ==
- Crowns and Pawns: Kingdom of Deceit, a video game inspired by the Broken Sword series and directed by the art director of Broken Sword 2.5
