= Gold and Glory: The Road to El Dorado =

2000 video game

- Developers: Planet Interactive (Game Boy Color); Revolution Software (PS, PC)
- Publishers: Ubi Soft; Light & Shadow Production
- Directors: Charles Cecil; Steve Ince
- Producer: Steve Ince
- Designer: Tony Warriner
- Programmer: Jake Turner
- Artists: Steven Gallagher; Andrew Proctor
- Writer: Eddie Crew
- Composer: Ben McCullough
- Platforms: Game Boy Color, Microsoft Windows, PlayStation
- Release: Game Boy Color: NA: 30 April 2000; EU: 12 October 2000; PlayStation: NA: 16 November 2000; EU: 7 December 2000; Windows: EU: 30 November 2000; NA: 28 December 2000
- Genre: Adventure
- Mode: Single-player

Gold and Glory: The Road to El Dorado is an adventure video game developed by Revolution Software. An adaptation of the film The Road to El Dorado, it was released on Game Boy Color, Microsoft Windows and PlayStation. Versions for PlayStation 2, Dreamcast, and GameCube were planned and announced, but never released.

== Gameplay ==
Gold and Glory is a graphic adventure game that takes place from a third-person perspective.

== Plot ==
The game's plot deviates from that of the film, but follows the same general outline.

== Development ==
Revolution Software developed Gold and Glory on a modified version of the game engine from In Cold Blood. It experienced a rapid development cycle. Revolution described the game as "classically adventure orientated and aimed at a very broad market".

The PlayStation and Microsoft Windows version of the game is drastically different to the Game Boy Color version. The main difference between the two games is that the PlayStation and Microsoft Windows version is a 3D adventure game, while the Game Boy Color version is a more traditional 2D side-scrolling platformer.

Versions of the game were intended to be released for the PlayStation 2 and Dreamcast, but were eventually cancelled.

== Reception ==
Reception

Aggregate scores
Aggregator	Score		
Aggregator	GBC	PC	PS
GameRankings	59%	60%	52%
Metacritic	N/A	N/A	34/100

Review scores
Publication	Score		
Publication	GBC	PC	PS
Adventure Gamers	N/A	2.5/5	N/A
AllGame	3/5	N/A	N/A
Electronic Gaming Monthly	N/A	N/A	7/10
Game Informer	4.5/10	N/A	1/10
GameRevolution	N/A	N/A	C−
GameSpot	7.3/10	N/A	3/10
IGN	5/10	4.2/10	4.8/10
Nintendo Power	7.3/10	N/A	N/A
Official U.S. PlayStation Magazine	N/A	N/A	2/5

The PlayStation version received "unfavorable" reviews according to the review aggregation website Metacritic.

== Game Boy Color port ==
The Game Boy Color edition of the game was released in June 2000, and is an 8-bit, 2D, side-scrolling platformer. The player takes control of either Tulio or Miguel, exploring a multitude of different levels such as a Spanish town, ships, jungles, caves or the city of El Dorado. The main objective in the first portion of the game is to find nine separate map pieces that will eventually lead to the lost city of El Dorado. Throughout each level, there are many bags, coins, and pots that can be collected to increase score, increase lives, or replenish the "ammunition" count of the player. While traversing the different levels you must fight off animals, plants, human enemies, or evade natural dangers. Every three levels is followed by a boss fight or challenge, the completion of which awards the player with a 6 character password key that can be entered in at the title screen to return to the same point of progress in the game. After defeating the final boss, Cortés, the game is complete.

The Game Boy Color version was one of a number of Ubisoft games for the platform that utilized the "Ubi Key" feature, allowing players to share data between games via the system's infrared port and unlock extra content.
