= Crowns and Pawns: Kingdom of Deceit =

- Developer: Tag of Joy
- Publisher: Headup Games
- Platforms: Linux; macOS; Windows; Nintendo Switch; PlayStation 4; PlayStation 5; Xbox One; Xbox Series X/S
- Release: Linux, macOS, Windows; WW: May 6, 2022; Nintendo Switch; WW: September 28, 2023; PS4, PS5, Xbox One, Xbox Series X/S; WW: February 27, 2025
- Genre: Adventure
- Mode: Single-player

Crowns and Pawns: Kingdom of Deceit is a point-and-click adventure game developed by Tag of Joy and published by Thunderful Publishing via Headup Games. Players investigate a mystery involving Lithuanian history.

== Gameplay ==
Milda, an American, goes to Lithuania after her grandfather bequeaths her his house in Vilnius. As she settles her grandfather's affairs, she discovers that he was investigating a mystery involving the history of Lithuania. Crowns and Pawns: Kingdom of Deceit is a point-and-click adventure game. Players can customize Milda's appearance and choose dialogue options when talking to friends and family. As Milda investigates various clues, she must find uses for inventory items. Some puzzles have multiple solutions. These can be based on players' previous actions, such as choosing Milda's occupation.

== Development ==
The developer, Tag of Joy, is based in Lithuania. The game was inspired by the Broken Sword series and directed by the art director of Broken Sword 2.5: The Return of the Templars. Crowns and Pawns: Kingdom of Deceit was released for Linux, macOS, and Windows on May 6, 2022. The game was released for Nintendo Switch on September 28, 2023, and for PlayStation 4, PlayStation 5, Xbox One, and Xbox Series X/S on February 27, 2025.

== Reception ==
Crowns and Pawns: Kingdom of Deceit received positive reviews on Metacritic. GamesRadar said the puzzles are "perfectly balanced" and praised the characterizations. RPGFan said the game does nothing wrong but is not memorable, either. Although they enjoyed the graphics, music, and setting, they felt the game has a lack of tension and fiddly puzzles. Eurogamer called it "a fun mystery" that is too charming to resist. Adventure Gamers said it is a must-play game with "well-executed graphics, music, interface, and voice acting". Adventure Gamers awarded it best gameplay of 2022.
