= In Cold Blood (video game) =

2000 video game

- Developer: Revolution Software
- Publishers: EU: Sony Computer Entertainment (PS); EU: Ubi Soft (PC); NA: DreamCatcher Interactive
- Director: Charles Cecil
- Producer: Steve Ince
- Designer: Tony Warriner
- Programmer: Jake Turner
- Writers: Charles Cecil; Neil Richards; Tony Warriner; Steve Ince; Jonathan Howard; Dale Strachan
- Composer: Barrington Pheloung
- Platforms: PlayStation, Microsoft Windows
- Release: PlayStation: EU: 14 July 2000; NA: 6 July 2001; Windows: EU: 27 October 2000; NA: 20 March 2001
- Genre: Action-adventure
- Mode: Single-player

In Cold Blood is a 2000 action-adventure video game developed by Revolution Software and published by Sony Computer Entertainment for the PlayStation. A port for Microsoft Windows was released in 2000 by Ubi Soft in Europe while DreamCatcher Interactive released both versions in North America in 2001. The player assumes the role of John Cord—an MI6 agent who is captured while on assignment and tries to figure out who betrayed him through a series of flashbacks.

It was released to positive reviews from critics, who praised the game's story, puzzles and graphics, but criticized its controls, combat and animation.

== Gameplay ==
Third-person gameplay typical of the game

In Cold Blood is a 3D adventure game played from a third-person perspective. The player guides John Cord's movements with a keyboard or gamepad. Cord must collect objects that can be used with other collectible objects, parts of the scenery, or other people in the game world to solve puzzles and progress in the game. Cord can engage in dialogue with other characters through conversation trees to gain hints of what needs to be done to solve the puzzles or to progress the plot. Combat is available, with Cord able to utilize weapons like guns with limited ammo to defeat enemies à la Resident Evil.

== Plot ==
=== Background ===
In Cold Blood is situated in Volgia, a fictional state on the east coast of the former USSR. After the Soviet Union collapsed, Dmitri Nagarov, chief of intelligence and security, took the opportunity to overthrow existing powers and declared independence. After his coup, Volgia started to invade its neighbors. The Volgian Freedom Fighters (VFF) is a resistance movement that is run by Gregor Kostov. The VFF has learned that the Volgians have acquired some special technology and has informed the Americans. They sent a spy named Kiefer to investigate, but communications were lost while he was investigating a uranium mine. The British were asked for help, and Alpha, the boss of MI6, sends agent John Cord, a long-time friend of Kiefer, to investigate.

After the introduction which shows parts of Cord's missions, the game starts with a scene in which Cord is interrogated by now premier Dmitri Nagarov, while he is being tortured by his assistant Lukyan. After the torture, Cord is fighting for his sanity, and all he knows for sure is that he was betrayed. He tries to piece together the fragments of his memory, and the player must reconstruct the events that led to his capture.

The game includes nine missions that Cord has to complete. Almost every mission ends with a transitional cut scene, showing how Cord is interrogated and tortured. These scenes include other characters like Alpha or Kostov, who will give information about the next missions.

=== Story ===
Cord goes to the uranium mine to locate Kiefer, but finds him dead. While there, he overhears a conversation between Chi-Ling Cheung (a secret agent of the People's Republic of China) and Byrdoy Tolstov (a professor in applied physics and chemistry). Tolstov reveals that they are not mining for uranium, but that they are experimenting with a special compound called tri-nepheline. Tolstov's daughter Alexandria is being held hostage at Security Headquarters (HQ), and Cord rescues her with the help of Chi, who is suspected of being a spy. Afterwards, Cord plants a bug on a secure server and removes a hard drive containing information relating to the VFF. Cord goes to the Containment Facility to apprehend Nagarov.

On the Kappa level, Cord destroys a gigantic robot called Spectre, and on the Omega level, he finds "specimens" held in pods in a laboratory. Cord raises the pod with Yerik Dimittrivich Oliakov, a former University Lecturer, who informs Cord about a place "where ships go to die." Nagarov arrives with Alexandria in front of him. Nagarov claims that he has hacked the computers of the Americans and Chinese, to simulate that each of them is preparing for war, so he can go on with his plans for Volgia. Cord later enters a room where Professor Tolstov is working, who tells him that the place "where ships go to die" is Vostograd, an abandoned naval base, where Nagarov will launch his missile. A mini-robot kills Tolstov, but Cord uses his ID card to gain access to the refinery's particle bombardment machine called Baby Blue, which he destroys with a bomb. Having met up with Kostov again, they leave to discover a truck with the dead bodies of Kostov's men. Kostov suspects Chi is a traitor.

Cord and Chi infiltrate Nagarov's base to destroy the Super Computer. On the roof of a large tower, Cord destroys a building with a surface-to-air missile launcher to create a diversion. When he meets with Chi again, she is being threatened by Kostov, who thinks she has betrayed his men. Chi kills Kostov before he can pull the trigger. With Chi's help, Cord uses an elevator to go to the top of the tower and he activates a cable car leading to an island. Cord explores the docking area, and he finds Alexandria in a cell on the security level. Cord uses the main elevator in the complex to access the other levels. Cord creates a diversion and enters level 1, where he inserts the explosive charge into the Super Computer. A cut scene is shown that reveals that Alpha has betrayed him. In a transmission, she tells that premier Nagarov had to be certain that Cord was not acting on her orders when he attacked the refinery. She assured Nagarov that Cord had not entered the facility, but Nagarov had a recording of Cord in the refinery. It resulted in a simple policy shift and the British are now working with the Volgians. As the reactor becomes critical, Nagarov and Lukyan leave the room. Until this moment, the game has taken place in Cord's memory, as he was interrogated by Nagarov after being captured, but from this point on it takes place in real time.

When Cord wakes up, he finds Chi who was instructed to kill him, but she decides to free him after a conversation. Cord and Chi head for the quayside at level 1 and manage to lower a bridge leading to a helicopter. After they free Alexandria, they fly away as the base is destroyed. After they spot Nagarov's nuclear submarine, they land on it. Cord and Chi explore the submarine to prevent the missile from being launched. They take care of the guards, and hear messages about problems with the reactor. After they split up, Lukyan knocks Chi down and takes her to a lower level. Lukyan later ambushes Cord, but he manages to kill him by pushing him into a turbine. In the bridge room, Nagarov enters armed with a gun, and after their conversation, Cord hits Nagarov with a ladder. Cord uses two keys he found to abort the missile launch. After releasing Chi, a message is heard that there is only one minute left to a critical reactor failure. They return to the deck and are picked up by Alexandria in the helicopter just before the submarine explodes. In the end sequence, Cord phones Alpha and tells her that he has dumped his information about her deal with Nagarov on the Chinese and American intelligence nets. The game ends showing Cord, Chi, and Alexandria approaching a beach where the sun sets.

== Development ==
After the unexpected success of the first two Broken Sword games on the PlayStation, Sony contacted Revolution Software to develop a game to be released initially on the console. Revolution wanted to move away from the style of its previous projects, making a game with a secret agent theme while making it an action-adventure game instead of a point-and-click adventure game. According to executive producer Charles Cecil, the game was inspired by crime films Pulp Fiction and The Usual Suspects. The game engine was written specifically for the title to enable real-time navigation and combat. In Cold Blood was released for PlayStation on 14 July 2000 in Europe and 6 July 2001 in North America. It was also released for Windows in Europe on 27 October 2000 and in North America on 20 March 2001.The Windows version can be purchased at GOG.com.

== Reception ==
Reception

Aggregate score
Aggregator	Score	
Aggregator	PC	PS
Metacritic	67/100	N/A

Review scores
Publication	Score	
Publication	PC	PS
AllGame	N/A	3/5
Computer Games Strategy Plus	4/5	N/A
Edge	N/A	4/10
Eurogamer	8/10	N/A
GameRevolution	C−	N/A
GameSpot	7/10	N/A
GameSpy	66%	N/A
GameZone	7/10	N/A
IGN	7.4/10	N/A
Next Generation	2/5	N/A
PC Gamer (US)	68%	N/A
Maxim	6/10	6/10

The PC version of In Cold Blood received "average" reviews according to video game review aggregator Metacritic. Gustavo Calvo-Simmons of Adventure Classic Gaming stated that, though the game has some "annoying flaws," it "can be quite charming to play if you seek to experience the thrill of being a high-tech spy infiltrating an enemy stronghold in a foreign land," and that it "offers up a decent story and interesting characters set in an alternate reality of cold war espionage." Ron Dulin of GameSpot praised the game's story and said that the voice acting and music is "great" and that the game can "also be funny," but stated that the game is "quite thin in both action and adventure" and also criticised certain elements of the gameplay. "Those who want action instead of fiction will find the game somewhat dull, but those who appreciate an original story and great atmosphere will find In Cold Blood to be a satisfying blend of espionage and science fiction." Pseudo Nim of Game Over Online criticised the game's gameplay, but praised its "solid story which actually makes sense" and its "very good graphics." Carla Harker of NextGen said of the game, "The worst thing about In Cold Blood is that the story is pretty interesting and you want to like it, but the rest is so bad you just can't."

Shane Wodele of GameVortex ranked the game as the "Top Pick," and praised its graphics, sound, story and puzzles. He both praised and criticised certain elements of the gameplay, and said: "The game's overall feel and playability is outstanding." Shawn Sanders of GameRevolution praised the game's "solid story, decent backgrounds and cool gadgets," but criticised its "lame animation, awful control and bland action." Vincent Lopez of IGN praised the game's presentation, sound and graphics, but criticised its gameplay, saying: "As an adventure fan, you may enjoy the cool spy storyline, and some of [the] more interesting stealth elements of the game, but action gamers will find themselves in a world of intrigue, but a world without challenge."

According to Tony Warriner of Revolution Software, the game was a commercial success. The company reported above 220,000 sales of its PlayStation edition in Europe alone during "the first few months" of its release. In January 2001, Warriner noted that its PlayStation version "really did well", and that its computer SKU had sold acceptably. That March, GameSpy's Mark Asher wrote that the game was also "selling well in the U.S. (doing about 100,000 copies) and doing better in Europe." PC Data recorded 28,159 North American retail sales for the PC version during 2001, and 5,825 during the first six months of 2002.

The staff of Computer Games Magazine nominated the game as the best adventure game of 2001, but ultimately gave the award to Myst III: Exile.
