= Broken Sword: The Shadow of the Templars =

1996 video game

- European PC version box art
- Developers: Revolution Software; Astraware (Palm OS)
- Publishers: Virgin Interactive: Windows, Mac OS Virgin Interactive PlayStation; EU: Sony Computer Entertainment; NA: THQ Palm OS & Windows Mobile Astraware
- Director: Charles Cecil
- Producers: Charles Cecil; Chris Dudas; Steve Ince; Michael Merren
- Writers: Charles Cecil; Dave Cummins; Jonathan Howard
- Composer: Barrington Pheloung
- Series: Broken Sword
- Engine: Virtual Theatre
- Platforms: Windows, Mac OS, PlayStation, Palm OS, Windows Mobile
- Release: 14 October 1996: Windows & Mac OS; EU: 14 October 1996; NA: 6 November 1996 PlayStation; EU: December 1996; NA: 24 March 1998 Palm OS; NA: 23 November 2005 Windows Mobile; NA: 2 August 2006
- Genre: Point-and-click adventure
- Mode: Single-player

Broken Sword: The Shadow of the Templars (also known as Circle of Blood in the United States) is a 1996 point-and-click adventure game developed by Revolution Software. It is the first in the Broken Sword series, co-written and directed by Charles Cecil. The player assumes the role of George Stobbart (voiced by Rolf Saxon), an American tourist in Paris, as he attempts to unravel a deep conspiracy involving a sinister cult and a hidden treasure, seeing him travel to various locations around Europe and the Middle East. The game's storyline was conceived to feature a serious tone and heavily influenced by research on Knights Templar by Cecil, but was also interlaced with humor and graphics in the style of classic animated films.

Development of the game saw considerable work to achieve its presentation. Artwork was conceived by Eoghan Cahill and Neil Breen, who particularly drew the backgrounds in pencil and digitally colored them in Photoshop, the game's design was handled by Tony Warriner and David Sykes, while the game's musical score was composed by Barrington Pheloung. The game was built with Revolution's Virtual Theatre engine, which had already been used by the company in two previous games, Lure of the Temptress and Beneath a Steel Sky.

Broken Sword proved a critical and commercial success following its release on 30 September 1996. Critics lauded praise on the game's story, puzzles, voice acting, writing, gameplay, and music, leading to it receiving numerous award nominations and wins. Sales of the games bested expectations by the company, with around one million units having been sold by 2001. The game has topped several listings of the best adventures games, with many developers citing Broken Sword as an influence in many future adventure games.

After its initial release on Microsoft Windows, Mac OS, and PlayStation between 1996 and 1998, the game was released on the Game Boy Advance under the same title, and later received ports to Palm OS and Windows Mobile in 2006. The game spawned a number of sequels that would collectively form the Broken Sword series: Broken Sword II: The Smoking Mirror in 1997; Broken Sword: The Sleeping Dragon in 2003; Broken Sword: The Angel of Death in 2006; and Broken Sword 5: The Serpent's Curse in episodic format, between 2013 and 2014. An extended version of the game, Broken Sword: The Shadow of the Templars – Director's Cut, was released between 2009 and 2012 for Wii, Nintendo DS, Microsoft Windows, OS X, iOS, Android and Linux. A remaster of the game was announced at Gamescom 2023, titled Broken Sword - Shadow of the Templars: Reforged. It was announced on August 16, 2024 that the game would be released on September 19, 2024. It is based on the original version, not the Directors Cut.

== Gameplay ==
Broken Sword is a 2D adventure game played from a third-person perspective. The player uses a point-and-click interface to interact with the environment and to guide protagonist George Stobbart through the game's world. To solve puzzles and progress in the game, the player collects items that may be combined with one another, used on the environment, or given to non-player characters (NPCs). The protagonist converses with NPCs via dialogue trees presented through "conversation icons" to learn about the game's puzzles and plot. Clues and other information are obtained by clicking on items in the inventory and on objects in the environment. The player navigates with a map, to which new locations are added as the story unfolds. Unlike in most adventure games at the time, the protagonist's death is possible, after which the player starts from the last save point.

== Plot ==
While on holiday in Paris, American tourist George Stobbart witnesses an assassin dressed as a clown steal an old man's briefcase from inside a café and kill him with a bomb. George then meets and teams up with photo-journalist Nicole Collard; she was supposed to meet the old man, Plantard, and is investigating a string of assassinations involving the same person in different costumes. George tracks the assassin to a hotel within the city, thanks to evidence they left behind near the café, and recovers an ancient manuscript from the hotel safe that the assassin, known as Khan, had taken from the old man. George smuggles the document around a pair of thugs that are after it as well. George and Nicole discover it to be related to the Knights Templar and housing clues relating to places across Europe and the Middle East.

Left to right: Sergeant Moue, George Stobbart, and Nicole Collard standing in front of the Café de la chandelle verte in Paris

Discovering a tripod mentioned in the manuscript being housed in a local museum, George visits the site from where it came from at Lochmarne, Ireland. He learns that the archaeologist who found it, Peagram, had disappeared, leaving a package in the care of his assistant. The assistant is abducted by Khan outside a local pub, dropping the package. George tracks it down; it contains a gem mentioned in the manuscript. At the excavation site, he locates a mural pointing him to the Montfauçon in Paris. In Paris, George investigates a hospitalised man named Marquet who wanted the gem, and learns the tripod is to be stolen, moments before Marquet is murdered. George and Nicole thwart the theft, and hold on to the tripod.

George finds a hidden chamber beneath Montfauçon, within the city's sewers. He spies on a group there claiming to be successors of the Templars and plotting their rise, Marquet's killer among them; Marquet (who they say "was a liability"), Peagram and Plantard are revealed as Neo-Templars as well. After they leave, George investigates the chamber, discovers through the gem and tripod another clue pointing to the village of Marib in Syria, and travels there. George discovers a nearby rock formation called the Bull's Head detailed in the manuscript. He uncovers in a hidden cave a glass lens that the Neo-Templars sought, an idol of the being called Baphomet, and a stone map of Britain. Khan, who had been seeking George, arrives and corners him, but George outwits the assassin and escapes.

Back at Nicole's, George learns from her that a friend, André Lobineau, uncovered his next destination: a villa in Spain owned by the De Vasconcellos family. With permission from its sole surviving member, George examines the grounds and the family mausoleum and uncovers the family's chalice, hidden centuries ago. Returning to Paris, George tracks down the tomb of a De Vasconcellos ancestor at the Montfauçon – where also the lens reveals in a stained glass window a burning Templar and the date 1314 – and investigates an excavation site that had uncovered another idol of Baphomet, using the chalice to find another clue depicting a church with a square tower. George investigates the grounds in Spain further and finds a hidden well based on biblical references taken from the tomb. Within, he discovers a mural depicting a river running across a chessboard.

George and Nicole compile their clues with the help of André, and learn that the Neo-Templars are travelling to a site under the ruins of a church in Bannockburn, Scotland. The pair takes the night train to get there, only for the Neo-Templars to abduct Nicole. An old lady from their carriage is revealed as a disguised Khan, who helps George to overcome the kidnappers and rescue Nicole. Before dying from his wounds, Khan, implicated to belong to the Hashshashin sect opposing the Templars, explains that he and George were on the same side. The pair arrives to the church, where they discover the Neo-Templars seek to acquire the power of Baphomet and reforge his sword, the titular Broken Sword. To stop them, George and Nicole destroy the site with explosives acquired from Khan, burying the Neo-Templars and destroying the ruins above. When the explosion is finished, they kiss.

== Development ==
In 1992, Cecil and Noirin Carmody met with Sean Brennan, then-head of publishing at Virgin Interactive, and spoke about how the Knights Templar would make an ideal subject to base a game on. Later, Virgin agreed to issue the game. In a September interview for French magazine Génération 4 at the time, Charles Cecil stated that he had begun working on a scenario for Revolution's third game, after 1992's Lure of the Temptress and 1994's then-upcoming Beneath a Steel Sky. The game would be set in Paris with a Templar story line. The following month, Cecil visited Paris to research the Templars; after reading The Holy Blood and the Holy Grail, he was certain there was enough known about the Templars to make them a good subject for a game. Cecil, Dave Cummins, and Jonathan Howard began work on the story and design. Cecil and Cummins attended a film-writing course and their script was read by Alan Drury, a senior BBC scriptwriter and dramatist. Revolution artist Steve Ince created initial location sketches for the game before working on Beneath a Steel Sky. He was promoted to producer halfway through the project.

Despite releasing the PC version, Virgin was not interested in publishing the game on the PlayStation, feeling that only 3D games would sell for the console. As a result, Cecil contacted Sony Computer Entertainment, who agreed to release the game for the console. In North America, Broken Sword was renamed to Circle of Blood. Cecil was uneasy about the name change, feeling that it gave a wrong impression of what type of game it was. In 1998 however, THQ published the game on the PlayStation platform under its original Broken Sword: The Shadow of the Templars title.

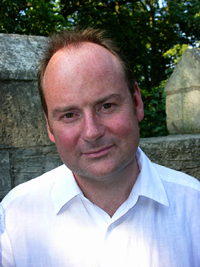
Charles Cecil, creator and director of the Broken Sword series

One of Cecil's goals was to depart from the humorous adventure games more popular at the time, such as LucasArts' Monkey Island series, by creating a game with good pacing and a complex storyline, a reason he thought the Knights Templar would be an ideal subject. Unlike LucasArts games, which used a question-and-answer conversation system, Broken Sword offered "conversation icons" that would not reveal to the player what the protagonist was about to say; Cecil's intention was to make the game more cinematic, but not resemble interactive movies of that time; he felt that they were "mimicking movies." He wanted to create two protagonists who would exchange ideas, helping drive the game along. He made George American and Nico French to appeal to US and European markets.

The team at Revolution had high expectations for Broken Sword, but there was significant competition. Revolution had a team that had created successful adventure games, but believed they needed to utilise the best of other creative industries. Eoghan Cahill and Neil Breen of Dublin's Don Bluth studios drew the backgrounds in pencil and digitally colored them in Photoshop. The introductory sequence and the main characters were done by animator Mike Burgess, who worked for the Red Rover animation studio. The game's graphics were animated in a style resembling classic animated films.

Cecil contacted composer Barrington Pheloung, who agreed to create the game's score. Around the time of the game's release, Pheloung stated: "Virgin would probably have been happy with a main theme and a few cues, but I thought that rather than creating an orchestral score like for a movie, I could make one which interacted with the game. So I've written over three hours of music, which is unique in the genre, and over 400 cues." He scored the music for orchestra and added the structural elements by breaking it up into sampled pieces.

Revolution had already cast Hazel Ellerby as Nicole Collard, but had trouble finding a voice actor for George Stobbart. Hazel, who went to the Guildhall School of Music and Drama in London, suggested her former schoolmate from Guildhall, Rolf Saxon, as George. Charles offered him the job, and Saxon accepted. The remaining credited voice actors in the original are Rachel Atkins, David Bannerman, Rosy Clayton, Jack Elliott, Steve Hodson, David Holt, Peter Kenny, Richard Mapletoft, Matthew Marsh, Colin McFarlane, Don McCorkindale, Gavin Muir, Paul Panting, and Andrew Wincott.

Cecil was the game's director and writer, Tony Warriner and David Sykes the designer-programmers, and Noirin Carmody the executive producer. The game uses the Virtual Theatre engine, as do Lure of the Temptress and Beneath a Steel Sky. The game's final cost was one million pounds. It received a Game Boy Advance port in 2002, and it was later ported to Palm OS and Windows Mobile in 2006.

In March 2009, Ubisoft released a director's cut of The Shadow of the Templars entitled Broken Sword: The Shadow of the Templars – Director's Cut for the Wii and Nintendo DS. Dave Gibbons, with whom Revolution worked on Beneath a Steel Sky, created additional artwork for the game. Due to the platform's size limits, the DS version contains no spoken dialogue, only subtitles. A version of the Director's Cut for iPhone and iPod Touch was released on January 20, 2010. In May, a version in high definition was released for the iPad. Versions for Windows and Mac OS X were released on September 2 on digital-distribution services. An Android version was released on Google Play in June 2012. The original version of the game is available from Sold-Out Software and GOG.com with Director's Cut purchases, and from Steam as free DLC for Director's Cut owners.

== Reception ==
=== Sales ===
Broken Sword was a commercial success, and marked the first time that Revolution Software received royalty payments on a game. By August 2000, it had achieved sales of 825,000 copies, of which 480,000 were sold at full price. It was particularly a hit on the PlayStation, despite low sales expectations. Tony Warriner noted in 2004 that the publisher anticipated "60,000 copies and it went on to do nearly 300,000". As of April 2001, combined sales of Broken Sword's computer and PlayStation releases had surpassed one million units, according to Revolution Software. In 2015, Charles Cecil stated that the PlayStation release alone accounted for 500,000 sales. Broken Sword: The Shadow of the Templars – Director's Cut also sold well – particularly the iOS version, which, along with The Smoking Mirror's remastered edition, was downloaded by over four million people in 2011. According to Cecil, the remake's sales were higher than those of The Sleeping Dragon and The Angel of Death.

=== Critical reviews ===
Reception

Aggregate scores
Aggregator	Score
GameRankings	81% (PS)
Metacritic	80/100 (PC)

Review scores
Publication	Score
Adventure Gamers	5/5
Edge	9/10
Electronic Gaming Monthly	7/10 (PS)
GameSpot	9.2/10 (PC); 5.8/10 (PS)
Next Generation	4/5 (PC); 3/5 (MAC)
PC Gamer (US)	80%
Adventure Classic Gaming	5/5
Computer Games Magazine	4/5
Generation 4	5/5
PC Games	A

Awards
Publication	Award
Génération 4	Best Adventure 1997
Quest	Best Quest

Broken Sword was acclaimed by critics, who praised the game's story, art direction, musical score, voice acting, and writing. Edge stated that Broken Sword was superior to LucasArts' adventure games, such as Monkey Island and The Dig, and believed it to be an "adventure gaming milestone" and the "best graphic adventure to date."

Adventure Gamers' Angella Mooney commented that the game's "deep and mysterious plot is designed to be thought-provoking and highly entertaining at the same time." GameSpot's Rebecca B. Anderson found that the game's combination of real history and "highly-creative" storytelling "add[s] spice to an already-entertaining adventure." Joe Antol of Adventure Classic Gaming wrote that the involvement of the Knights Templar generated a "unique experience of creative storytelling." A writer for Next Generation magazine stated that the story is "rich in mystery and intrigue, with plenty of puzzles and locations to explore". Edge's reviewer praised the game's use of "legend and modern-day intrigue", and believed that "Revolution Software finally escaped the shadow of Monkey Island et al. and [have] taken the graphic adventure to new levels in terms of both story and spectacle." The writer commented that, by weaving its "trans-European plot around the legends of the Knights Templar", the game "succeeds in appearing weighty and complex without ever losing its sense of place".

Mark Wolf of PC Gamer US called the game "visually stunning", praising the animated graphics as "crisp and clear" and the artwork as "simply beautiful". He also wrote, "At the highest setting, the background and foreground scroll separately, delivering a sense of depth you don't see in many graphic adventures. Even the atmosphere of each of the areas you explore fit the locale." Mooney called the animation "extremely colorful and well-executed" and noted that the art team "have taken this style of animation and really made an elegant, mature game with it." The writer also noted that the environments are "detailed and inviting". Anderson called the game a "visual treat" and a "work of art," noting that "every scene is filled with rich, lush, illustrative detail that rivals any animated feature film." Next Generation called the character movements "fantastic" and the cutscenes "a joy to watch." The writer for Edge praised its art direction, in which "every visual element is polished to the 'nth' degree". The reviewer believed that "the SVGA artwork by far exceeds the competition in this genre."

Edge complimented its musical score for "play[ing] a large part in mood enhancement", noting that "it's beautifully orchestrated and adds immeasurable atmosphere." Mooney also praised the score, calling it "ambitious and beautiful" and saying it adds a very "cinematic feel" to the experience. Mooney said that the game's voice acting is "of supreme quality" with "delightful dialogue", but noted that long conversations might "turn some players off". Wolf was more critical of the voice acting, calling it "not too professional" and "the worst thing in the game".

Next Generation reviewed the Macintosh version of the game, and stated that "despite the ambitious storyline and animation [...] we might have felt grateful for a month's delay, given the poor quality of the port." They cited the difficult installation which causes conflicts with standard extensions and the slow speed even on high-end computers.

Mooney stated that the game's puzzles are well integrated into the plot and are moderately challenging. Wolf called the puzzles inventive and challenging, but believed that some require "too much pixel-hunting". Next Generation said that almost all of the puzzles are simplistic, requiring no more than to find an object and use it on something else. Despite acclaiming the Windows version, GameSpot deemed the PlayStation version mediocre, criticizing technical deficiencies, such as lengthy load times and muddy graphics. Electronic Gaming Monthly's four reviewers acknowledged that the frequent load times are annoying but were highly positive about the PlayStation conversion, gushing over the beautifully animated cutscenes that blend seamlessly with the game, its support for the PlayStation Mouse, and most especially the story, with its "complex and twisting plot", quirky humor, and compelling characters. Cecil later cited the PlayStation version as his "one big regret" regarding the game. He believed that the team should have introduced direct control over the player character in this version, instead of mouse-driven point-and-click interaction.

=== Awards and nominations ===
Génération 4 awarded it "Best Adventure 1997", and it received the award for "Best Quest" from the magazine Quest. The BBC magazine program Live & Kicking awarded it "Best PC Game of 1996". The game was nominated for Computer Gaming World's 1996 "Adventure Game of the Year" award, which ultimately went to The Pandora Directive. It was also a finalist for the Computer Game Developers Conference's 1996 "Best Adventure Game/RPG" Spotlight Award, but lost the prize to The Elder Scrolls II: Daggerfall.

The Director's Cut was nominated for the "Best Story" award at the 2009 British Academy Video Games Awards, and Pocket Gamer awarded the DS version the "Pocket Gamer Silver" award in 2009 and the iPhone version the "Pocket Gamer Gold Award" in 2010. The Wii and DS versions were nominated for the "Best Port/Updated Re-release" award at Adventure Gamers' 2010 Aggie Awards. The iPhone version was nominated for the "Best Adventure/RPG Game" award at the 2011 Pocket Gamer Awards. The Wii version won the award for "Best European Adventure" at the 2011 European Games Awards.

== Legacy ==
=== Listings ===
Adventure Gamers ranked Broken Sword fourth on its lists of "Top 20 Adventure Games of All-Time" in 2004 and "Top 100 All-Time Adventures" in 2011. In 2006, Adventure Classic Gaming put the game in third place on its list of the "Top 10 retro graphic adventure games of all time from PC to consoles". It was listed on Bright Hub's "Best Windows Mobile Games Software" in 2008. In 2010, Retro Gamer placed it in second on its list of the "Top 20 Adventure Games of All-Time ... not by LucasArts", and was included in Universe Publishing's 1001 Video Games You Must Play Before You Die, a book by video game designer and programmer Peter Molyneux and longtime Edge editor Tony Mott published in 2010. NowGamer listed it on its 2011 feature, "Greatest Point-And-Click Games (Not By LucasArts)". In 2012, it ranked eighth on GamesRadar's "Best point-and-click adventure games". Broken Sword and its remake are listed on Adventure Gamers' "Top Adventure Games" recommendations list. It is currently the third best-reviewed adventure game on GameSpot.

The game's Goat Puzzle appeared on Computer and Video Games' 2011 feature, "Gaming's hardest puzzles". In 2012, it was listed on GameFront's "5 Crazy Difficult and Intricate Video Game Puzzles". Computer and Video Games also ranked Barrington's original intro theme 21st on its 2012 "Video game soundtracks: The 100 best themes of all time" list. The Telegraph listed Khan as one of "The 10 best video game assassins", while in 2013, Kotaku listed him as one of "The Scariest Clowns And Jesters In Video Games". The Director's Cut has been placed on top lists as well, particularly the iOS versions.

=== Influence ===
"In terms of loving adventure games, Charles Cecil – and in particular Broken Sword – is a big influence for me. I love the classic, older-style adventure games too, but Broken Sword is the pinnacle for me in terms of puzzles rooted in real-world logic, a fantastic, character-driven story etc."
— Telegraph writer and Richard & Alice co-creator Ashton Raze on his creative influences.

In his book Game Plan: Great Designs that Changed the Face of Computer Gaming, British video game journalist Ste Curran wrote that Broken Sword influenced the adventure games Toonstruck, in which Cecil has a "Special Thanks" credit, and Escape from Monkey Island, which features a puzzle that involves a broken sword. Kevin Bruner, co-founder of Telltale Games, has said that he is a Broken Sword fan. Ashton Raze, a writer for The Telegraph and the co-creator of the 2013 adventure game Richard & Alice, said that Broken Sword is his biggest influence. In his review of the 2010 adventure game Deponia, Declan Skews of Video Games Interactive said that the game drew inspiration from Broken Sword.

==== The Da Vinci Code ====
Cecil has said that the game's fanbase believes Dan Brown to have been influenced by Broken Sword when writing his novel, The Da Vinci Code, because of the parallels between the two works. Cecil claimed that he is flattered by this sentiment, but that he would never claim so himself due to the threat of Brown's "very serious" lawyers. Joao Diniz Sanches of Pocket Gamer said Broken Sword's story is a "tale, some would argue, that effortlessly outclasses Dan Brown's similarly themed and tricksy novel." In an article about Broken Sword, Computer and Video Games described the Knights Templar legend as a "great mythology to base a game on", and noted that Broken Sword "came out years before the Da Vinci Code made that sort of thing popular."

=== Sequels and re-releases ===
Broken Sword's success led to it creating a series that would spawn four sequels. Broken Sword II: The Smoking Mirror was released in 1997, and retained the same engine, while expanding gameplay by allowing players to control both George and Nicole to solve puzzles. In 2003, Revolution released Broken Sword: The Sleeping Dragon, which moved towards 3D graphics via the RenderWare engine and incorporating a direct-control mechanism for its gameplay.

In 2006, the company released Broken Sword: The Angel of Death (known as Secrets of the Ark: A Broken Sword Game in North America), which returned to the point-and-click system used in the first two games. The game was designed to use Sumo Digital's game engine, but released only for home computer. After the fourth title, Revolution initiated a Kickstarter project in August 2012 to raise capital for creating a fifth installment under the title Broken Sword 5: The Serpent's Curse, releasing it in two episodes in 2013 and 2014. The game returned the series to 2D graphics, and it was released in September 2013. and a new game engine based on the original system used for The Shadow of the Templars.

In 2009, Cecil decided to remake the original title for more updated platforms, such as Wii and Nintendo DS, and released between 2009 and 2012 Broken Sword: Shadow of the Templars – The Director's Cut. The extended version created several new puzzles, reimagined the presentation with comic book styled approach for text and conversation, and incorporated new story elements concerning Nicole Collard's involvement in the original plot, while changing several puzzles and removing "death" sequences. After releasing the Director's Cut version of Broken Sword, Revolution released a remastered edition of the second game, titled Broken Sword: The Smoking Mirror – Remastered, in 2010.

A new remaster of the first game, Broken Sword - Shadow of the Templars: Reforged, was released on 19 September 2024. It features enhanced visuals and audio from the original 1996 release. A Nintendo Switch 2 Edition was released on November 12, 2025.

=== Retrospectives ===
In June 2020, comedian Jason Manford conducted a lengthy retrospective interview with Charles Cecil and Rolf Saxon about the game's development and legacy. This followed Manford's live playthrough of the entire game over the course of several weeks on YouTube, during the first UK COVID-19 lockdown.

=== Film ===
In May 2007, ComingSoon.net reported that Cecil, encouraged by the success of The Angel of Death, had begun work on a Broken Sword theatrical film adaptation. According to the website, producers Jay Douglas and Nav Gupta and their CastleBright Studios production company were involved. Justin Kaplan introduced Cecil to the company and was set to be one of the producers. Conversations had begun with directors and screenwriters from films such as Harry Potter, Casino Royale and X-Men.

In July 2008, Cecil said he was conversing with small studios from Los Angeles. Although he was interested in making a film, he believed that it was not necessary, since the series was already successful and a bad film could only "damage" its reputation. Cecil said that he was not prepared to "give somebody [he doesn]'t know the editorial control", and that, should the film be created, he would write it himself. He wanted any adaptation to be true to the source material, a film that "enhances [the game] rather than cashes in on it". In May 2009, Cecil stated that he was in discussion with the production company Radar Pictures, known for films such as The Last Samurai and The Chronicles of Riddick, and that he was re-writing the game into a film.

In August 2012, Cecil said that he and Revolution were trying to "find the right partner" to create the film. Cecil believed that "a lot of film makers now in their early 30s played Broken Sword the first time around, so they have a lot of affection, and a number of them know a lot about the brand as well." However, he restated his opinion that it "would be much better not to have a movie at all, than to have a bad movie." While Cecil said that Revolution's main focus was the upcoming Broken Sword: The Serpent's Curse, he added that he was "sure there [would] be a film at some point". He also said that he was "sure it will be really good, because we'll do our utmost to make sure that it is."

In May 2026, Variety reported that a film adaptation was in active development, with Revolution Software co-producing alongside Story Kitchen, the production company behind the Sonic the Hedgehog film series and Amazon's Life Is Strange television adaptation. Evan Spiliotopoulos, the screenwriter of Disney's live-action Beauty and the Beast and Pirates of the Caribbean: Dead Men Tell No Tales, was attached to write the screenplay. Cecil and his Revolution partner Noirin Carmody were set to produce alongside Story Kitchen co-founders Dmitri M. Johnson and Michael Lawrence Goldberg. Cecil said Story Kitchen had come to the project "with a deep passion for the IP," and that creative discussions had focused on translating the existing identity of the series rather than reshaping it for the screen.
