= Rolf Saxon =

American actor

- Born: July 7, 1955 (age 71); Alexandria, Virginia, U.S.
- Occupation: Actor
- Years active: 1980–present
- Website: www.rolfsaxon.com

Rolf Saxon (born July 7, 1955) is an American actor. He is best known for his role as CIA analyst William "Bill" Donloe in the Mission: Impossible film series, as well as for his voice-over work in numerous video games, movies and TV shows, including as the American narrator of the BBC children's series Teletubbies (1997–2001).

Saxon has also appeared in the BBC television drama The Trials of Oz (1991), the ITV mystery drama Agatha Christie's Poirot (1993), in video games such as the Broken Sword series (1996–2013) and The Witcher (2007), and in films such as Tomorrow Never Dies (1997), Saving Private Ryan (1998), Woman in Gold (2015) and A Hologram for the King (2016), which have received several awards and nominations.

== Life and career ==
Rolf Saxon was born at Fort Belvoir in Alexandria, Virginia on 7 July 1955. He has worked with the American Conservatory Theater, California Shakespeare Theater, Berkeley Mime Troupe, and Omphalos Street Theatre Company. After training as an actor, Saxon immediately began appearing on the stage and on television; he made his film debut as Dick Tipton in the BBC adaptation of Frances Hodgson Burnett's novel Little Lord Fauntleroy (1980). Initially known as a television actor, he appeared as attorney Hudson J. Talbot III in the ITV drama Capital City (1989–1990). Saxon is best known for his role of CIA analyst William Donloe in Mission: Impossible (1996), a role he would later reprise in Mission: Impossible – The Final Reckoning (2025). Saxon has also appeared as the narrator for the American dub of the BBC children's series Teletubbies (1997–2001).

=== Awards and nominations ===
Upon his graduation at the Guildhall School of Music and Drama, Saxon was awarded the Gold Medal. While performing with the Omphalos Street Theatre Company at the Edinburgh Festival Fringe, he was nominated for the Fringe First Award. Critics praised Saxon's performance as Victor Franz in The Price (2005), earning him the Manchester Evening News Theatre Award for Best Actor in A Leading Role.

== Filmography ==
=== Film ===
Year	Title	Role	Notes
1983	The Lords of Discipline	Rowland	
1983	Curse of the Pink Panther	2nd speedboat man	
1983	Invitation to the Wedding	Peter	
1984	Nineteen Eighty-Four	Patrolman	
1985	The Dirty Dozen: Next Mission	Robert E. Wright	
1985	D.P.	Soldier	
1988	A Time of Destiny	Kentucky	
1988	Joyriders	First American Sailor	
1992	Wild West	Yuhudi	
1996	Mission: Impossible	William Donloe	
1997	Tomorrow Never Dies	Philip Jones	
1997	Coronation Street Viva Las Vegas	Stephano Delaney	Video
1998	Saving Private Ryan	Lieutenant Briggs	
1999	Entrapment	Director	
1999	Teletubbies: Merry Christmas, Teletubbies!	Narrator (American voice)	Video
2000	Honest	Alden Wheaton	
2000	Eisenstein	Hollywood Producer	
2000	Obedience	Herbie Clayton	Short
2000	Teletubbies: Christmas in the Snow	Narrator (American voice)	Video
2002	Teletubbies: Silly Songs and Funny Dances	Narrator (American voice)	Video
2011	Creature		(loop group)
2012	All I Think of is You	Wilkins	Short
2013	Being Us	Madrone	
2013	The Book of Daniel	Nebuchadnezzar	
2014	Alien Strain	Sheriff Espinosa	
2015	Woman in Gold	Stan Gould	
2016	A Hologram for the King	Joe Trivoli	Uncredited
2017	August Falls	Mikey	
2018	After Ever After	Himself	Creative director and co-director
2025	Mission: Impossible – The Final Reckoning	William Donloe	

=== Television ===
Year	Title	Role	Notes
1980	Little Lord Fauntleroy	Dick	TV movie
1981	The Gentle Touch	Doctor	1 episode
1982	Q.E.D.	American Associate	
1982	Starting Out	Mr Moran	1 episode
1983	Play for Today	Chemist	
1983	Shades of Darkness	Robert Elwell	
1983	Chessgame	Mike Klobucki	
1984	The First Olympics: Athens 1896	Tim Coldfelt	Unknown
1984	The Tripods	Black Guard	1 episode
1985	American Playhouse	Soldier	1 episode
1985	Tender is the Night	American in Bar	Unknown
1985	Lace II	Hollywood Director	TV movie
1986	The Deadly Recruits	Mike Klobucki	TV movie
1987	Pulaski	Jerome Summers	8 episodes
1989	Boon	Luke Hennessey	1 episode
1989	Birds of a Feather	Rodney Kauffman	1 episode
1989	Tailspin: Behind the Korean Airliner Tragedy	Frank	TV movie
1989–1990	Capital City	Hudson J. Talbot / Hudson J. Talbot III	22 episodes
1990	She-Wolf of London	Charlie Bodine	2 episodes
1991	The Upper Hand	Brian Thomas	Episode: "Old Flames"
1991	The Trials of Oz	Professor Ronald Dworkin	1 Episode
1992	Hostages	Plaskett	TV movie
1993	Agatha Christie's Poirot	Dr. Ames	Episode: "The Adventure of the Egyptian Tomb"
1993	Runaway Bay	Daniel Vincent	1 episode
1994	Love Hurts	Sam Levison	4 episodes
1995	The Tomorrow People	Mr. Roach	1 episode
1995	Space Precinct	Lieutenant Verro Walker	1 episode
1995	Crown Prosecutor	Tom Reid	1 episode
1995	One for the Road	Hank	1 episode
1995	Night Watch	Ted Fisk	TV movie
1995	The Affair	Capt. Marks	TV movie
1996	London Suite	Carl Dolby	TV movie
1997	The Canterville Ghost	Hiram Otis	TV movie
1997–2001	Teletubbies	Narrator	Voice, United States/PBS Version
1999	Goodnight Sweetheart	Murray	Episode: "Grief Encounter"
1999	The Great Detectives	Reader	Episode: "The Simple Art of Philip Marlowe"
1999	Hippies	Jerry Gurvitz	Episode: "Protesting Hippies"
1999	RKO 281	Flunkie #1	TV movie
2003	Ultimate Force	Art Spellman	Episode: "The List"
2005	The Eagle: A Crime Odyssey	Sam Johnson	2 episodes
2006	Little Britain	US President	2 episodes
2011–2013	They Live Among Us	Father Buer / Fr. Buer	4 episodes

=== Stage ===
Year	Title	Role
1992	Lost in Yonkers	Eddie
1995	Oleanna	John
1995	Laughter on the 23rd Floor	Milt
1998	The Frogs	Dionysos
1998	A View from the Bridge	Eddie Carbone
2000	The Seven Year Itch	Richard
2000	The Graduate	Mr. Robinson
2001	Dinner with Friends	Gabe
2002	The Winter's Tale	Polixenes
2002	Pericles, Prince of Tyre	Simonides
2002	Frankie and Johnny in the Clair De Lune	Johnny
2003	Chicago	Billy Flynn
2004	Blues for Mr. Charlie	Parnell James
2005	The Price	Victor Franz
2005	Death and the Maiden	Gerardo
2006	Jerry Springer: The Opera	Jerry Springer
2006	Hello Dolly	Vandergelder
2007	Babes in Arms	Seymour Flemming
2009	The Floating Light Bulb	Jerry
2011	Danger: Memory!	Kroll
2011	The Chosen	Malter

=== Video games ===
Year	Title	Role	Notes
1996	Broken Sword: The Shadow of the Templars	George Stobbart	Voice
1997	Broken Sword II: The Smoking Mirror	George Stobbart, The Goat, Robert Foster	Voice
2000	Play with the Teletubbies	Narrator	Voice
2003	Broken Sword: The Sleeping Dragon	George Stobbart	Voice
2006	Broken Sword: The Angel of Death	George Stobbart	Voice
2007	The Witcher	Leo	Voice
2009	Broken Sword: The Shadow of the Templars – Director's Cut	George Stobbart	Voice
2010	Broken Sword II: The Smoking Mirror – Remastered	George Stobbart	Voice
2013	Broken Sword 5: The Serpent's Curse	George Stobbart, Gehnen, Goat	Voice
