= Beneath a Steel Sky =

Cyberpunk science-fiction point-and-click adventure from 1994

- Developer: Revolution Software
- Publishers: Virgin; Konami
- Designers: Charles Cecil; Tony Warriner; Daniel Marchant; Dave Cummins; Dave Gibbons
- Programmers: David Sykes; Tony Warriner; James Long
- Writer: Dave Cummins
- Composer: Dave Cummins
- Engine: Virtual Theatre
- Platforms: MS-DOS, Amiga, Amiga CD32, iOS, Windows
- Release: MS-DOS & Amiga; UK: March 4, 1994; NA: 1994; iOS; October 7, 2009
- Genre: Adventure
- Mode: Single-player

Beneath a Steel Sky is a 1994 point-and-click adventure game developed by British developer Revolution Software and published by Virgin Interactive Entertainment for MS-DOS and Amiga home computers. It was made available as freeware – and with the source code released – for PC platforms in 2003. Set in a dystopian cyberpunk future, the player assumes the role of Robert Foster, who was stranded in a wasteland known as "the Gap" as a child and adopted by a group of local Aboriginals, gradually adjusting to his life in the wilderness. After many years, armed security officers arrive, killing the locals and taking Robert back to Union City. He escapes and soon uncovers the corruption which lies at the heart of society.

Originally titled Underworld, the game was a collaboration between game director Charles Cecil and comic book artist Dave Gibbons, and cost £40,000 to make. Cecil was a fan of Gibbons's work and approached with the idea of a video game. The game has a serious tone but features humour-filled dialogue, which came as a result of Cecil's and writer Dave Cummins's goal to find a middle ground between the earnestness of Sierra's and the slapstick comedy of LucasArts's adventure games. It was built using Revolution's Virtual Theatre engine, first used in Revolution's previous and debut release, 1992's Lure of the Temptress.

It received positive reviews at the time of its release and is retrospectively viewed as a cult classic and Revolution's greatest game besides Broken Sword: The Shadow of the Templars. A remastered edition was released for iOS in 2009 as Beneath a Steel Sky Remastered, which also received a positive reception from the gaming press. A sequel was greenlit during the Broken Sword: The Serpent's Curse 2012 Kickstarter campaign, and was announced in March 2019. Entitled Beyond a Steel Sky, it was released on Apple Arcade in June 2020, on Steam in July 2020, and on GOG.com in March 2021.

== Gameplay ==
Graphic style and interface

Beneath a Steel Sky is a 2D adventure game played from a third-person perspective. The player uses a point-and-click interface to interact with the environment and to guide protagonist Robert Foster through the game's world. To solve puzzles and progress in the game, the player collects items that may be combined with one another, used on the environment, or given to non-player characters (NPCs). The protagonist converses with NPCs via dialogue trees to learn about the game's puzzles and plot. Clues and other information are obtained by clicking on items in the inventory and on objects in the environment. Unlike in most adventure games at the time, the protagonist's death is possible, after which the player starts from the last save point. In the remastered iOS version, the point-and-click interface is replaced with a touch user interface, a hint system is added, and hotspots are highlighted.

== Synopsis ==
=== Background ===
Beneath a Steel Sky is set at an unknown point in a dystopian future, when the Earth has been significantly damaged by pollution, nuclear fallout, or both.

In Australia, the six states and two territories who have been consumed by their respective capital cities are described as "city states". Union City is the second largest of the six remaining city states after the acquisition of Asio-City. Within this socio-political milieu, the national intelligence agency ASIO wield a great deal of power.

After the "Euro–American War", all participants agreed upon a set of ideals described as the "neo democratic principles" which remove all labour representation and social benefits. Ironically, those that subscribe to these principles are called "Unions", contrasting the real world definition of what a trade union pushes for. Those that oppose the Unions' ideals are called "Corporations". All of the City States in Australia are either Corporations or Unions.

The larger political context of the game involves a conflict between Union City and the Hobart Corporation, whereby they are each trying to achieve market dominance by the use of sabotage. During the game, characters in Union City remark that Hobart Corporation is winning the "economic war" by flooding the market with "cheap, gimmicky garbage", although it is never clarified whether this is mere propaganda.

=== Plot ===
The immediate backstory is introduced via a comic book that tells the story of a young boy called Robert who is the sole survivor of a helicopter crash in "the Gap" (the name applied to the Outback at the time of the game). Too young to fend for himself, Robert is adopted by a group of locals, who teach him the skills he needs to survive in this harsh new environment; they name him Robert Foster, partly due to him being fostered by them, but also because of the discovery of an empty can of Foster's Lager found near the crash site. Over the years, Foster learns engineering and technology and builds a talking, sentient robot called Joey. Joey's personality is stored on a small circuit board, which can easily be inserted and removed from many types of robot. This allows him to change bodies as the situation requires, provided his circuit board is not damaged. His commentaries on the current "shell" he is in are a running gag throughout the game.

As the game starts, Foster is kidnapped and his tribe annihilated by security soldiers sent from Union City by its all-powerful computer, LINC (Logical Inter-Neural Connection). The abductors refuse to give Foster any explanation as to what is happening. Shortly upon arriving in the city, the helicopter malfunctions and crashes in the city's upper level. Foster survives and flees, making his way into a recycling plant, carrying Joey's circuit board with him.

Foster places Joey's circuit board into a robotic vacuum cleaner (something about which Joey is none too happy). He then attempts to escape the plant, but is cornered by a security officer who had also survived the accident. The officer, Reich, addresses Foster as "Overmann". Just as Reich is about to kill Foster, a nearby security camera shoots a laser, disarming him. Reich tells the camera, which he reveals is controlled by LINC, that Foster must be stopped. In answer the camera shoots him again, killing him. Foster takes the officer's access card and sunglasses before he continues his escape.

As he makes his way further down the city, Foster eventually arrives in the abandoned subway tunnels. There he discovers that LINC has grown exponentially, to the point where he is now half-machine, half-organic entity. However, in order to function, LINC needs a human host to share its brain. The current host is Foster's biological father, who is old and has become severely worn out from his symbiosis with LINC. It is revealed that LINC sent for Foster because, with the death of its current host inevitable, it needed a replacement, and only a blood relative would do. Foster ultimately defeats LINC by plugging Joey (who, at this point, could be optionally given the new name "Ken" by Foster) into the mainframe. Joey/Ken is able to take control of the system, and set about turning Union City into a utopia.

== Development ==
While working at Activision, Revolution co-founder and CEO Charles Cecil got the idea of working with Dave Gibbons, artist and co-creator of comic book Watchmen, as Cecil was a fan of the comic book himself. He approached Gibbons, but shortly thereafter, the old Activision broke down. However, they maintained a friendship, and Cecil later contacted Gibbons to ask him to work on Revolution's second game. Seeing his son play video games, Gibbons became interested and realized that his skills in drawing, writing and conceptualizing could be useful in a gaming environment. Joining the team just before the release of Lure of the Temptress, Gibbons was sent a rudimentary outline of what could happen in the hypothesised game, and wrote a longer story with new characters and scenarios, to which Revolution then further added. Originally the game was named Underworld, a title proposed by Gibbons, but it was renamed due to the release of Ultima Underworld: The Stygian Abyss.

The production values became much higher for Beneath a Steel Sky than for Lure of the Temptress, resulting in a game six times larger, and by the end of 1993, the team working on the game had grown to eleven. The game was created in sections, which allowed the team to ensure that each part was "perfected" before moving on. Its 2-year development cost £40,000, a large amount of money for the company at the time.

=== Creative and technical design ===
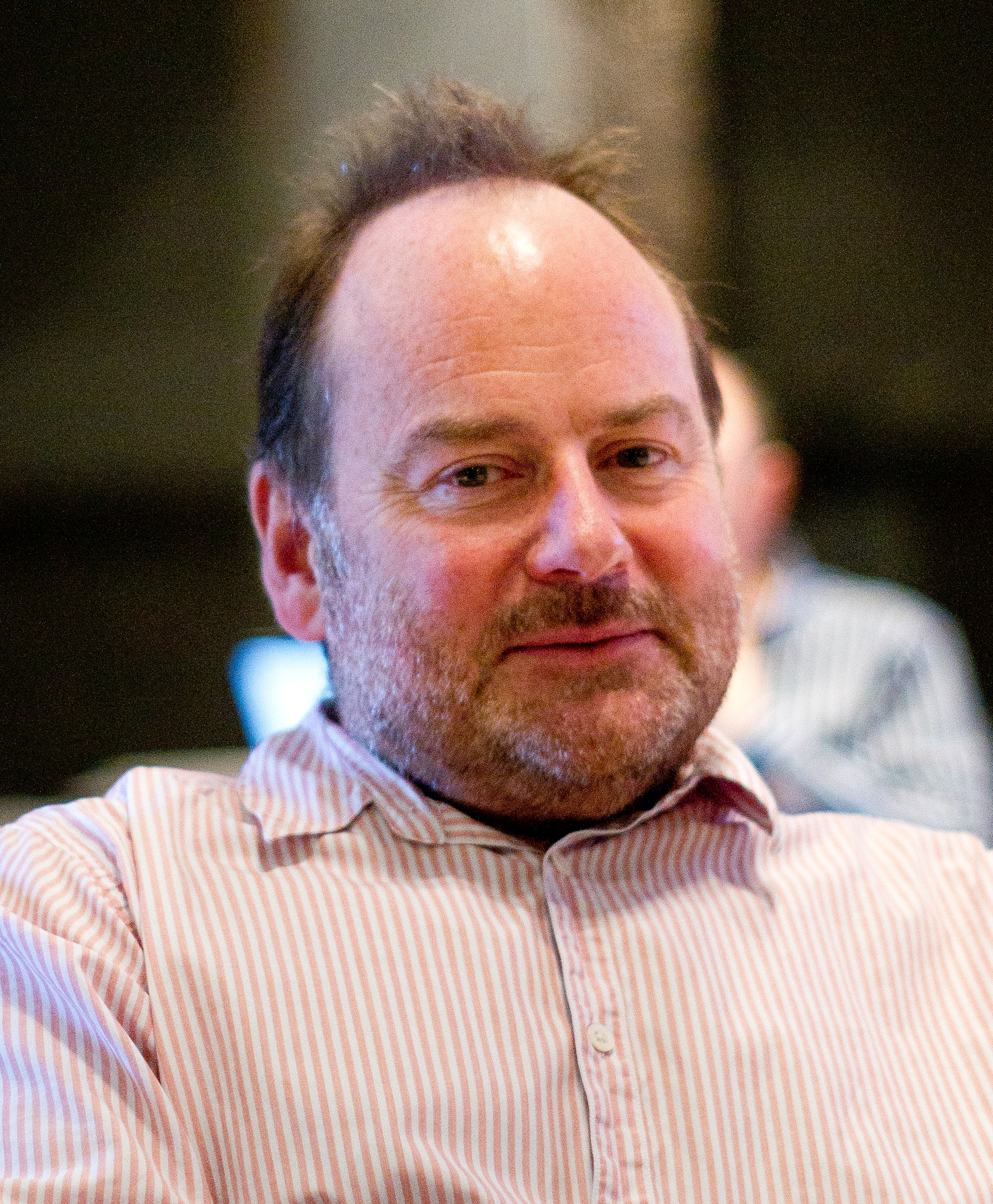
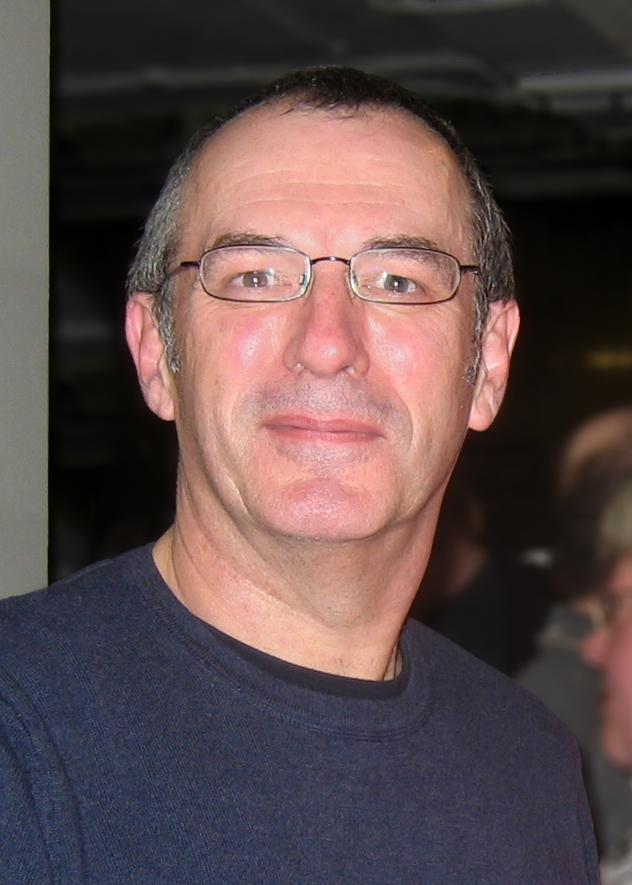
Beneath a Steel Sky was a collaboration between Revolution's CEO and game director Charles Cecil (left) and comic book artist Dave Gibbons (right) of Watchmen fame.

The designers' goal was to create a visual bridge between comic and video game graphics. Gibbons drew the backgrounds in pencil, starting with roughs, which were sent to Revolution to see if they were technically feasible. Once agreed upon, Gibbons would then make the final sketch. The pencil sketches were then colored, mainly by Les Pace. The backgrounds were scanned on a Macintosh as 24-bit, 1000x1000 pixel images with 16 million colors, and then transformed to 8-bit, 320x200 pixel images with 256 colors for the PC version. The backgrounds were designed so that the sprites would appear clear on the screen and would not mix with the backgrounds. Gibbons created the sprites using Deluxe Paint on an Amiga. Steve Ince, who joined the team in February 1993, created a number of sprite animations, also painting some backgrounds based on Gibbons's sketches. Gibbons also designed the characters, although he found it challenging to get a character's personality and expression in a face that was only around seven pixels wide and nine pixels high with a limited palette. He would have liked to design a character in a similar manner to Prince of Persia or Flashback, but Revolution wanted something more detailed, so the result became a compromise. All character sprites are smoothly animated with around 20 positions each. According to Gibbons, about 75% of the backgrounds and characters he designed were used in the game.

Dave Cummins wrote the dialogue for the game. The tone of Revolution's early games was born from a tension between Cummins and Cecil. Cummins wanted to be more flippant with dialogue, while Cecil wanted to be more serious. Their goal was to find the middle ground between Sierra's "ridiculously earnest" stories and the slapstick comedy of LucasArts games. For the voice acting, which is only included in the CD-ROM version, Revolution used actors from the Royal Shakespeare Company. Only two days were spent recording over five thousands lines of dialogue. Not pleased with the results, however, Revolution decided on a lengthy re-recording, and realized that voice actors should be used, rather than stage actors. As a result of this, the speech does not always match the on-screen text, with English terms being Americanized. Cummins was also responsible for the score of the game, writing a specific tune for each of the main locations.

Beneath a Steel Sky became the second game to use Revolution's Virtual Theatre engine, after Lure of the Temptress. According to Cecil, the original version of the engine seemed less applicable in Beneath a Steel Sky, as the ability to issue commands conflicted with the gameplay they intended to create. Lure of the Temptress had one story that was moved forward by a key event, whereas Beneath a Steel Sky had multiple threads. In one way this presented them with "exciting gameplay opportunities, but in others it cordoned off more ambitious ideas in terms of multilinearity." As a consequence, some of the engine's features were scaled back. Tony Warriner and David Sykes, both Revolution co-founders and programmers, had to update the engine, which was part of the new deal with Virgin Interactive. As an example of change in the updated engine, Virtual Theatre 2.0, Warriner explained that in Lure of the Temptress, the system controlled everything, for instance specific routines to a door. So if there was a door on-screen, the door-routine was called up to handle it. The consequence was that every door looked the same and acted the same, so if a door was somewhat different from the last one, it caused a problem. This was changed in the new system, as it was object oriented and no distinction was made between a proper object like a door or key.

=== Release ===
Beneath a Steel Sky was presented at the European Computer Trade Show in the London Business Design Centre in April 1993 and at the Consumer Electronics Show in Chicago in June 1993. According to French magazine Génération 4, the game was supposed to be released by the end of October 1993. Various playable demos of the game were made; one was added to the first issue of PC Gamer, and Amiga demos were added as cover disks to several Amiga magazines.

Beneath a Steel Sky was published in March 1994 by Virgin Interactive on floppy disks and CD-ROM. It came on 15 floppy disks, as opposed to Lure of The Temptress, which came on four. Because of the Amiga restrictions, a few animations had to be left out, as not all Amiga owners had a hard drive. Each conversion of the images to the Amiga resulted in a loss of detail. According to Revolution in-house artist Adam Tween, it took a couple of days to "touch up" the screens. A comic book created by Gibbons, which was translated into the introduction sequence of the game, came as part of the game package.

Beneath a Steel Sky was translated from English into French and Portuguese. This was the first game not developed in Portugal to be released with a Portuguese translation.

=== Freeware release and Remastered edition ===
In August 2003, the game was released as freeware, with its assembly language source code by Revolution Software, although the license under which the source code is released does not qualify as a free software license. The source code availability made it possible for the ScummVM project to support the game, which allows the game to be played on Windows, OS X, Linux, Windows CE and other compatible operating systems and platforms.

In November 2011, James Woodcock released an enhanced soundtrack of the game for ScummVM. The game is also available as a zero-cost download on digital distribution services, including Desura and GOG.com.

In July 2009, Revolution announced that a remastered edition of Beneath a Steel Sky would be released on iOS later that year. The remastered edition features new animated movies by Gibbons, a context-sensitive help system and improved audio quality. The game was released on the App Store on October 7, 2009. The animated movies in the iOS remastered version make use of the original stills and use a sliding paper-like style to animate them. The source code was released under GNU GPL-2.0-or-later.

== Critical reception and commercial performance ==
Reception

Review scores
| Publication | Score |
|---|---|
| Adventure Gamers | 4/5 |
| PC Gamer (US) | 91% |
| CU Amiga | 95% |
| Amiga Format | 94% |
| Amiga Power | 86% |

Awards
| Publication | Award |
|---|---|
| PC Gamer | Best Dialogue |
| Golden Joystick Awards | Best Adventure |

Beneath a Steel Sky was critically acclaimed. In 1995, PC Gamer awarded it the "Best Dialogue" award, and it won the "Best Adventure" award at the Golden Joystick Awards. It was also a commercial success, reaching the number one place on the British Gallup charts. Eurogamer's Simon Parkin later summarized that it "sold extremely well", with lifetime sales between 300,000 and 400,000 units by July 2009. Parkin noted that the majority of its sales derived from European countries.

CU Amiga's Tony Dillon proclaimed Beneath a Steel Sky as "one of the greatest adventures ever." Amiga Format's Rob Mead said that the game is an "Utterly brilliant", "massive, intense and atmospheric adventure which will keep you on tenterhooks right until its final startling conclusion." PC Gamer US's Steve Poole called it "slick, funny," "absorbing" and "one of the most playable adventures of all time" "that will appeal to a wide variety of gamers". Amiga Power's Cam Winstanley said that it is "an example of what an adventure game should be like – funny, enthralling and convincing." Adventure Gamers' Claire Wood called it an "enjoyable", "engaging adventure classic, thoroughly enjoyable playing experience" and "a 1984 for the computer game generation."

Winstanley thought that the main highpoint of the game was the story, with an ending "that's actually quite a surprise." Wood praised the "intelligent, thought provoking storyline" that "becomes more and more compelling, punctuated by unexpected plot twists and macabre discoveries."

Dillon praised the game's "stunning" graphics. Mead said the comic book-like artwork projected a great "atmosphere". Winstanley felt that the game looked "superb". Wood said the graphics "have aged reasonably well".

Many of the critics praised the game's "adult humour", showcased through numerous one-liners and double entendres. Dillon praised the charm of the various characters and their personalities built through conversations. Wood also praised the Revolution's "trademark" "light-hearted humour". Both Dillon and Wood, as well as Winstanley, highlighted Joey's witty remarks. Poole called the writing "some of the funniest dialog ever" and the characters "warped" and "interesting".

Reviewers praised the game's puzzles for being logical but still challenging. Poole found the puzzles to be "tricky" and "engaging", but stated "the difficulty of the puzzles in the final third of the game is disproportionately high" and that he disliked some of the "race the clock" puzzles. On the other hand, Winstanley felt that the "real time" puzzles "add pace". Wood's only gripe with the puzzles were the "odd and disorienting" LINC-space sequences.

Dillon wrote that the controls were so "simple that Revolution can finally lay claim to having created the ultimate in intuitive control methods." Poole labeled them "a masterwork of simplicity". Winstanley also praised the "simple" interface, while Wood said that the "unobtrusive interface" is one of the factors that make the game a "highly immersive experience".

=== Remastered version ===
Reception

Aggregate scores
| Aggregator | Score |
|---|---|
| GameRankings | 85% |
| Metacritic | 82/100 |

Review scores
| Publication | Score |
|---|---|
| IGN | 8.5/10 |
| Pocket Gamer | 8/10 |
| TouchArcade | 4/5 |
| Slide to Play | 4/4 |

The remastered 2009 iOS version was also very well received. It holds an aggregate score of 85% on GameRankings based on 7 reviews, and 82 out of 100 on Metacritic based on 5 reviews. It was nominated for Best Port/Enhanced Re-release at the Adventure Gamers' 2009 Aggie Awards in 2010. The game sold around 20,000 units in its first month of release, while Cecil anticipated sales of around 70,000 copies during its first year on sale, and roughly 100,000 in its lifetime.

The remastered release is available with Spanish, French, Swedish, Portuguese, German, Italian, and English subtitles.

Slide To Play's Keith Andrew said that "Beneath a Steel Sky somehow feels bigger and bolder than its rivals, raising the bar and highlighting what others have so far failed to achieve. Perfectly suited to its new home, this remastering of a classic game serves up point-and-click play nearly unmatched on the App Store." Andrew noted that the point-and-click interface "merg[es] seamlessly with touchscreen controls" and that the hint system is "a feature that might antagonize some of Steel Sky's hardened fan-base, but one perfectly pitched at the iPhone generation."

IGN's Eduardo Vasconcellos stated that the game "is a reminder of how good the old point-and-clickers really were. The updated elements only add to the experience – especially the cutscenes. If you're looking for an intriguing story, solid gameplay and some nostalgic charm, Beneath a Steel Sky is for you." Vasconcellos complimented the "intuitive and responsive" touch controls and said that the "visuals are an attractive update of the original release", and gave the game an "Editor's Choice" award.

Pocket Gamer's Tracy Erickson said that the game "remains as entertaining as it did 15 years ago, galvanising the adventure gaming resurgence on iPhone." Erickson felt that the touch controls are "only functional and not fantastic," but that "measures have been taken to address [problems of the original point-and click interface] to a respectable degree," and that the "minimally enhanced presentation raises alarm." However, he concluded that even though "More could have been done to brush the dust off this ageing title," "it's still a standout game." He gave it a "Silver Award".

== Legacy ==
Although retrospectively Broken Sword: The Shadow of the Templars is generally looked upon as Revolution's magnum opus, Beneath a Steel Sky still holds the status of a cult classic and has been featured on numerous "all-time top" lists:

Amiga Power ranked Beneath a Steel Sky 42nd on their Amiga Power All-Time Top One Hundred in 1994. Adventure Gamers ranked the game 17th on their list of Top 20 Adventure Games of All-Time in 2004, and 19th on the Top 100 All-Time Adventures in 2011. In 2006, Adventure Classic Gaming put the game in 9th place on their list of the Top 10 retro graphic adventure games of all time from PC to consoles. Retro Gamer placed it in third on its list of Top 20 Adventure Games of All-Time ... not by LucasArts in 2010. It was included in Edge editor Tony Mott's 1001 Video Games You Must Play Before You Die, a book published in 2010. In 2011, PC Gamer ranked it ninth on its list of 20 free PC games you must play. In the same year, Now Gamer listed it as one of the Greatest Point-And-Click Games (Not By LucasArts). In 2014, TechRadar placed it 40th on its list of the Top 50 best free games you should play today. Pocket Gamer included it on its list of Top 10 adventure games that should be revived on DS in 2009.

Beneath a Steel Sky: Remastered has been placed on numerous top lists as well, including Edge's Top 50 iPhone Games at 26th in 2009, as well as Pocket Gamer's Top 10 point-and-click adventure games on iPhone and iPad and Mashable's 10 Classic PC Games That Found New Life on the iPhone, both in 2010.

Beneath a Steel Sky is often referenced in Revolution's Broken Sword games, including 1997's Broken Sword II: The Smoking Mirror, in 2009's Broken Sword: The Shadow of the Templars – Director's Cut and 2013/2014's Broken Sword 5: The Serpent's Curse, in the form of an easter egg.

=== Sequel ===
In 2004, Cecil commented "Beneath a Steel Sky 2 is a project Revolution has been considering for a while, and has started to move forward on, but we are unable to comment beyond this."

In an interview with Eurogamer in 2006, Cecil spoke of his admiration for the work done by ScummVM and the resulting interest in a sequel. He also stated that if he were to make the game he "would dearly love to work with Dave Gibbons again." In a February 20, 2009 interview with IGN UK about the Wii and DS versions of Broken Sword: The Director's Cut, Cecil and Gibbons re-iterated their interest in a sequel to Beneath a Steel Sky.

On September 25, 2012, Revolution announced that Beneath a Steel Sky 2 would be greenlit if their Broken Sword 5: The Serpent's Curse Kickstarter reached $1 million. Despite Broken Sword: The Serpent's Curse failing to meet the $1 million 'stretch goal', Revolution announced that the success of its crowdfunding campaign had inspired them to greenlight Beneath a Steel Sky 2. However, Revolution later clarified that Beneath a Steel Sky 2 will not necessarily be the studio's first project following Broken Sword 5 and that they would "think" about what their next game will be after finishing the Broken Sword game. In February 2014 it was reported that Beneath a Steel Sky 2 had never entered production, despite previous reports to the contrary. The reason cited was that the Broken Sword franchise took up the sole focus of the company.

On March 25, 2019, Revolution announced that Beyond a Steel Sky would be released on Apple Arcade (iOS, macOS, tvOS) later in 2019. The game was released on Apple Arcade on June 26, 2020, on Steam on July 16, 2020, and on GOG.com on March 19, 2021.
