= Revolution Software =

British video game developer

- Type: Private
- Industry: Video games
- Founded: 1989 (37 years ago)
- Founders: Charles Cecil; Tony Warriner; David Sykes; Noirin Carmody
- Headquarters: York, England
- Key people: Charles Cecil (managing director)
- Products: Broken Sword series
- Website: revolution.co.uk

Revolution Software Limited is a British video game developer based in York, founded in 1989 by Charles Cecil, Tony Warriner, David Sykes and Noirin Carmody. Its most popular line of games is that of Broken Sword, a series which began in 1996 with Broken Sword: The Shadow of the Templars. As of 2024, there have been a further four iterations in the series: The Smoking Mirror (1997), The Sleeping Dragon (2003), The Angel of Death (2006) and The Serpent's Curse (2013).

== Company history ==
=== 1992–1994: Lure of the Temptress and Beneath a Steel Sky ===
The company's logo was inspired by the 1981 film Excalibur and designed in collaboration with a graphic design firm in Hull.

Released in 1992 for the Amiga, Atari ST, and MS-DOS, Lure of the Temptress was both critically and commercially a success which helped set the company up for its future game releases. Revolution released the game as freeware on 1 April 2003.

Their next game was released in 1994; Beneath a Steel Sky became a hit on the Amiga and IBM PC compatibles. The game focused on protagonist Robert Foster's abduction and subsequent search for answers in a dystopian city of the future. In that period it also ported Sierra's King's Quest VI: Heir Today, Gone Tomorrow to the Amiga. Virtual Theatre system was used instead of Sierra's Creative Interpreter because of its much better performance.

=== 1996–1997: Broken Sword: The Shadow of the Templars and Broken Sword II: The Smoking Mirror ===
Despite the success of Beneath a Steel Sky, it was the company's next game that it would become best known for, and which would have both the biggest critical and commercial success. Broken Sword: The Shadow of the Templars was released for PC and PlayStation in 1996 and was later ported to the Game Boy Advance in 2002. The game revolves around the story of George Stobbart, an American tourist whose holiday in Paris is rudely interrupted by a bombing. Investigating, he runs into photo-journalist Nicole Collard, and the two embark on a globe-trotting adventure. The hand drawn graphics, story and characters, and gameplay helped cement the company's reputation for story driven games. The game was quickly followed by a well-received sequel, Broken Sword II: The Smoking Mirror. According to Charles Cecil, each of the first two Broken Sword games sold around 1,000,000 copies in the mid-1990s.

=== 2000: In Cold Blood and Gold and Glory: The Road to El Dorado ===
In July 2000, the company released its first 3D game In Cold Blood for the PlayStation (later released for Windows in October 2000). Set in the near future, the game featured John Cord, an MI6 agent. Sent to the fictional, former Soviet region of Volgia, the player embarks on a mission to investigate a newly discovered substance, Blue Nephrine. However, Cord is betrayed and must work out by whom, while simultaneously trying to work out what plans the dictator of Volgia, General Nagarov, has for this mysterious new chemical and the implications for the world.

In December 2000, the company also released a children's adventure game Gold and Glory: The Road to El Dorado to coincide with the release of the film The Road to El Dorado.

=== 2001–2002: Good Cop Bad Cop cancellation ===
The company then started work on Good Cop Bad Cop, an action game for the PlayStation 2, Xbox and GameCube. However the game was eventually cancelled so that the company could concentrate on Broken Sword: The Sleeping Dragon.

=== 2003–2006: Broken Sword: The Sleeping Dragon and Broken Sword: The Angel of Death ===
Released in November 2003, Broken Sword: The Sleeping Dragon featured 3D graphics, and moved away from the 2D point-and-click style of older games. As the game was developed for Windows, PlayStation 2 and Xbox simultaneously, it decided to implement a direct control mechanism for the protagonist, instead of mouse control clicking on hot spots, as this was easier to convert to console game pads.

Revolution released Broken Sword: The Angel of Death on 15 September 2006. At the start of the game, George is working as a bail bonds clerk when he falls in love with Anna-Maria, a woman who asks George to help her find an artifact.

=== 2009–2011: Director's Cut and Remasters ===
On 1 March 2009, Revolution Software released a director's cut version of its first Broken Sword series, titled Broken Sword: The Shadow of the Templars – Director's Cut, for Wii and Nintendo DS platforms (later on iOS, Windows and OS X). According to a Charles Cecil interview with Pocket Gamer, the iOS version of the Director's Cut sold around 160,000 copies by December 2010. The company also announced that The Director's Cut is coming soon to Android.

In October 2009, Beneath a Steel Sky – Remastered was made available on the Apple App Store. The Remastered Edition sold around 20,000 copies in its first month and expected to hit 70,000 sales in the first year and 100,000 lifetime sales.

The company announced the remastered edition of the second game in the Broken Sword series on 9 December 2010, called Broken Sword: The Smoking Mirror – Remastered. The game was released in late 2010 on iPhone, April 2011 on OS X and May 2011 on Windows.

=== 2012–present: Broken Sword 5: The Serpent's Curse, Beyond a Steel Sky and Broken Sword 6 ideas ===
On 25 July 2012, Charles Cecil posted on his personal Facebook account: "Totally focused on the announce video for our next game. I am thrilled by how it's looking, and can't wait to talk publicly, but completing the video for end of the month – as originally promised – now seems somewhat ambitious." After a short delay, the game was officially announced to be a fifth entry in the series: Broken Sword 5: The Serpent's Curse. The game was announced with a Kickstarter campaign and a video, showing some of the game's graphics and hinting at its storyline.

After the release of Beneath a Steel Sky – Remastered, Charles Cecil and Dave Gibbons stated that a sequel could be likely and that iPhone would be the ideal platform. During the Broken Sword 5 crowdfunding campaign on Kickstarter, the company originally put Beneath a Steel Sky 2 as a $1,000,000 bonus stretch goal if the new Broken Sword game raises enough money, but it only raised $820,000 (including PayPal donations). On 24 September 2012, after failing to reach the bonus stretch goal, the company's co-founder Tony Warriner said that "after the huge success of the Broken Sword 5 crowdfunding campaign on Kickstarter, it inspired us to begin work on Beneath a Steel Sky 2. Development of the sequel will begin after the release of Broken Sword 5. We're delighted by the recent level of interest in a sequel to Beneath a Steel Sky and are currently discussing design ideas for this project which we plan to go into development following the release of Broken Sword 5. We're deeply touched that our Beneath a Steel Sky fans are as enthusiastic today as they were when the original game released in 1994." Beneath a Steel Sky 2 is to be developed for iOS, Android, PC, Linux and OS X. There is also a possibility in looking into a console version release. In a September 2015 interview, Cecil announced that he was working on a story for Broken Sword 6 which would involve the main characters travelling to Germany. In a later interview from April 2020, however, Cecil said he was "mulling around" ideas for Broken Sword 6, while his focus seemed to be still on Beyond a Steel Sky, though he did not exclude the idea that the next Broken Sword game may follow the company's present project.

Towards the end of 2023, Revolution announced that a sixth instalment of Broken Sword was in development, titled Broken Sword: Parzival's Stone, which was scheduled for release in 2024. It has since been delayed indefinitely. In addition, a "Reforged" revamp of the first game, Shadow of the Templars, was due for release in 2024, with updated graphics and other minor changes to the original gameplay.

In 2026, Variety reported that a Broken Sword film was in development, as a collaboration between Revolution Software, producer Story Kitchen, and screenwriter Evan Spiliotopoulos, the writer of Disney’s live-action film Beauty and the Beast from 2017.

== Games developed ==
Year	Game	Platform(s)
1992	Lure of the Temptress	Atari ST, Amiga, MS-DOS
1993	King's Quest VI: Heir Today, Gone Tomorrow	Amiga
1994	Beneath a Steel Sky	Amiga, CD32, MS-DOS, iOS, Linux, Windows, OS X
1996	Broken Sword: The Shadow of the Templars	Mac OS, MS-DOS, Windows, PlayStation
1997	Broken Sword II: The Smoking Mirror	Windows, PlayStation
1999	Disney's Animated Storybook: Mulan	PlayStation
1999	A Bug's Life Activity Center	PlayStation
2000	In Cold Blood	Windows, PlayStation
2000	Gold and Glory: The Road to El Dorado	Windows, PlayStation
2000	Disney's Learning with Mickey	PlayStation
2001	Who Wants to Be a Millionaire: 2nd Edition	PlayStation 2
2002	Broken Sword: The Shadow of the Templars	Game Boy Advance
2003	Broken Sword: The Sleeping Dragon	Windows, PlayStation 2, Xbox
2006	Broken Sword: The Angel of Death	Windows
2009	Broken Sword: The Shadow of the Templars – Director's Cut	Android, iOS, Windows, Nintendo DS, OS X, Wii
2010	Broken Sword: The Smoking Mirror - Remastered	Android, iOS, Windows, OS X,
2013-14	Broken Sword 5: The Serpent's Curse	Android, iOS, Linux, Windows, OS X, PlayStation Vita, PlayStation 4, Xbox One, Nintendo Switch
2020-21	Beyond a Steel Sky	macOS, iOS, tvOS, Linux, Windows, OS X, Nintendo Switch, PlayStation 4, PlayStation 5, Xbox One, Xbox Series X/S
2024	Broken Sword - Shadow of the Templars: Reforged	Windows, OS X, Nintendo Switch, Nintendo Switch 2, PlayStation 5, Xbox One, Xbox Series X/S

== Recognition ==
=== Awards and nominations ===
Year	Publication/Ceremony	Nominated game or person	Award	Result
1995	PC Gamer	Beneath a Steel Sky	Best Dialogue	Won
1995	Golden Joystick Awards	Beneath a Steel Sky	Best Adventure	Won
1997	Generation 4	Broken Sword: The Shadow of the Templars	Best Adventure 1997	Won
1997	Quest magazine	Broken Sword: The Shadow of the Templars	Best Quest	Won
2001	GameVortex	In Cold Blood	Top Pick	Won
2003	British Academy Video Games Awards	Broken Sword: The Sleeping Dragon	Best Design	Nominated
2003	British Academy Video Games Awards	Broken Sword: The Sleeping Dragon	Best PC Game	Nominated
2003	British Academy Video Games Awards	Broken Sword: The Sleeping Dragon	Best Adventure Game	Nominated
2003	Just Adventure	Broken Sword: The Sleeping Dragon	Best Adventure Game of 2003	Won
2004	Game Developers Choice Awards	Broken Sword: The Sleeping Dragon	Excellence in Writing	Nominated
2006	Develop	Charles Cecil	Development Legend	Won
2009	Slide to Play	Beneath a Steel Sky: Remastered	Game of the Month, October 2009	Won
2009	Slide to Play's iPhone Games Holiday Buyer's Guide	Beneath a Steel Sky: Remastered	Best Adventure Game	Won
2009	British Academy Video Games Awards	Broken Sword: The Shadow of the Templars – Director's Cut	Best Story	Nominated
2010	Adventure Gamers' 2009 Aggie Awards	Broken Sword: The Shadow of the Templars – Director's Cut	Best Port/Updated Re-release	Nominated
2010	Adventure Gamers' 2009 Aggie Awards	Beneath a Steel Sky: Remastered	Best Port/Updated Re-release	Nominated
2011	European Games Awards	Broken Sword: The Shadow of the Templars – Director's Cut	Best European Adventure	Won
2011	Order of the British Empire	Charles Cecil	Member of the Order of the British Empire	Won

== See also ==
- Frogwares
- Legend Entertainment
- Pendulo Studios
