= Charles Cecil =

British video game designer and director

Charles Cecil MBE
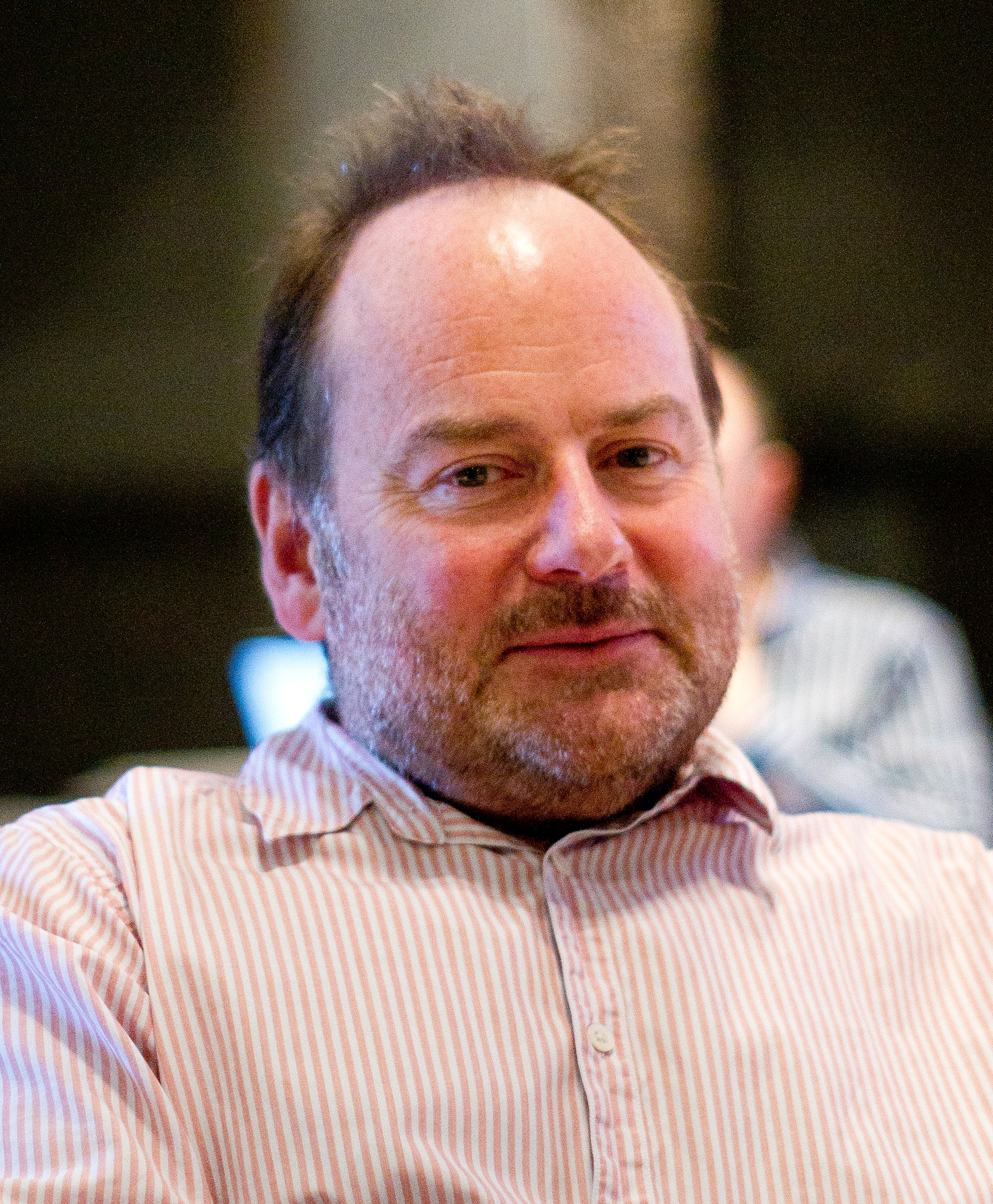
- Born: 11 August 1962 (age 64)
- Education: Bedales School; University of Manchester
- Occupation: Video game designer
- Known for: Revolution Software
- Notable work: Broken Sword; Beneath a Steel Sky
- Spouse: Noirin Carmody
- Website: revolution.co.uk

Charles Cecil MBE (born 11 August 1962) is a British video game designer and co-founder of Revolution Software. His family lived in the Democratic Republic of the Congo when he was still very young, but was evacuated two years after Mobutu Sese Seko's coup d'état. He studied at Bedales School in Hampshire, England. In 1980 he began his studies in Engineering Manufacture and Management at the University of Manchester, where he met student Richard Turner who invited him to write text adventures for Artic Computing. After completing his degree in 1985 he decided to continue his career in game development and became director of Artic. The following year he established Paragon Programming, a game development company working with British publisher U.S. Gold. In 1987 he moved into publishing as a software development manager for U.S. Gold. A year later he was approached by Activision and was offered the position of manager of their European development studio.

In 1990, Cecil founded Revolution along with Tony Warriner, David Sykes and Noirin Carmody. Originally located in Hull, the company moved to York in 1994. Cecil then became Revolution's managing director and focused on writing and design. For the company's first title, Lure of the Temptress (1992), Cecil conceived with others an innovative game engine, called Virtual Theatre, that was designed by Tony Warriner. Cecil's interest in cinematic techniques and technical developments became manifest in Broken Sword: The Shadow of the Templars and the games that followed. Broken Sword 1 was a 2D point-and-click game, but by the end of the nineties Cecil took the company to 3D games with direct control, including Broken Sword: The Sleeping Dragon (2003). In 2004 with no project at hand, he, as head of the company, let everyone go. Nevertheless, he continued to design by implementing the so-called "Hollywood model", in which each time a team is assembled to create a movie. For the fourth Broken Sword game, Broken Sword: The Angel of Death, he decided to work with Sumo Digital. By the end of the decade new developments made it possible to renew the back catalogue of Revolution, and in 2011 Develop ranked Revolution Software among the top 50 most successful development studios in the world.

Lure of the Temptress was followed by a string of critically and commercially successful adventure games, including Beneath a Steel Sky, the Broken Sword series, In Cold Blood and Gold and Glory: The Road to El Dorado. Beneath a Steel Sky and the Broken Sword series are often referred to as one of the best adventures of all time, appearing on numerous "top" adventure game lists and receiving several awards and nominations. Sales of Broken Sword 1 and 2 have made over US$100 million and have sold over 3 million copies worldwide. New versions were downloaded by over 4 million people in 2011. Cecil worked on various adventure games outside Revolution, including The Da Vinci Code and Doctor Who: The Adventure Games.

Cecil is currently operating as managing director of Revolution. He co-founded Game Republic in 2003 and has been a director on the board. He is a member of the advisory committee for the renewed Game Republic, and has been on the advisory panel of the Edinburgh Interactive Entertainment Festival. He is member of the advisory panel of the Evolve and Develop Conference, a board member of Screen Yorkshire, and a member of Skillset's Computer Games Skills Council. He regularly talks at events and to mainstream press about creative and commercial aspects of the gaming industry. In 2006, he was awarded the status of "Development Legend" by Develop. He was appointed Member of the Order of the British Empire in the 2011 Birthday Honours for services to the video game industry.

== Biography ==
=== Early career ===
As a baby, Charles lived in the Democratic Republic of the Congo where his father David was sent by Unilever to reconstruct their accounting systems. When Cecil was two and his mother Veronica was about to give birth to his sister, they were evacuated after Mobutu Sese Seko's coup d'état. His taste for adventure may have started in those days, and the Congo would become a background in one of his games. Cecil was then educated at Bedales School in Hampshire, England. In 1980 he enrolled on a course in mechanical engineering at the University of Manchester. On a course sponsored by Ford he met student Richard Turner, who invited him to write some text adventure games for his new computer game company, Artic Computing. He decided to take up on the invitation, for like all students, he needed beer money. In those days, game development was the true period of being the auteur of a game, of bedroom coders, of direct contact with the customers, a relation that was lost when big game publishers took over. Cecil's first game became "Adventure B" (aka Inca Curse, published in 1981). It was followed by "Adventure C" (aka Ship of Doom, published in 1982) and "Adventure D" (aka Espionage Island, published in 1982). Each were highly successful on the Sinclair ZX81, ZX Spectrum and Amstrad formats.

After completing his degree in 1985, Cecil decided to continue his career in game development and became director of Artic Computing. When Artic closed down, he established Paragon Programming (1986), a game development company working with major British publisher U.S. Gold. In 1987 he left development and moved into publishing as Software Development Manager for U.S. Gold. One year later he was approached by Activision and was offered the position of manager of their European development studio. Noirin Carmody, who would become his wife, was general manager at Activision, where she was responsible for establishing the Sierra name in Europe.

=== Managing director of Revolution Software ===
In 1989, when Cecil was still working at Activision, he decided to set up his own development studio. He contacted Tony Warriner, who had worked with him at Artic Computing and Paragon Programming, and Warriner brought in a fellow programmer, David Sykes. Together with Noirin Carmody, his then-partner and General Manager at Activision UK, they founded Revolution Software (March 1990). The company was originally located in Hull, but moved to York in 1994. Besides becoming Revolution's managing director, Cecil would focus from the start on writing and design. At that time the graphic adventure genre was dominated by LucasArts and Sierra On-Line, and they wanted to create something in between, an adventure game that didn't take itself too seriously, but did have a serious story. For Revolution's first title, Cecil conceived with others an innovative game engine, called Virtual Theatre, and the engine itself was designed by Tony Warriner. The result was Lure of the Temptress (1992), and though it was their first product, it became one of the successful games that would follow. For the second title, Beneath a Steel Sky (1994), often referred to as a cult classic, Cecil contacted comic book artist Dave Gibbons. He had met Gibbons when he was still at Activision, and he admired Gibbons's work on Watchmen. Gibbons became involved in the design of the game, and their collaboration would inspire Cecil's next move.

The divergence of and distinction between film and video games is one of Cecil's pet subjects, and his interest in cinematic techniques and technical developments would become manifest in Revolution's upcoming titles. He started to hire external talent from the TV and film trades for the big-budget production Broken Sword: The Shadow of the Templars (1996). Already in the next year the sequel, Broken Sword: The Smoking Mirror, was released. By the end of the nineties, when the adventure market changed, he had to change course as well. Instead of the previous games, that were point-and-click adventures, he chose to move to 3D and direct control with In Cold Blood (2000), a narrative driven adventure game with action elements. At the same time a second title, Gold and Glory: The Road to El Dorado (2000), was developed after DreamWorks's film The Road to El Dorado. As Broken Sword was originally intended to be a trilogy, a third episode was planned. Unlike In Cold Blood, that combined 3D characters with pre-rendered graphics, the third Broken Sword game, Broken Sword: The Sleeping Dragon (2003), became a real-time 3D adventure game, with mild action elements (such as using stealth, climbing, shimmying, and pushing objects). Initially, when he announced that Broken Sword 3 was going to be a 3D game, it caused an outcry by the fans of the series. Cecil had had no choice to adopt 3D though, for when they needed funding in the beginning of 2000, publishers had become obsessed with the idea that everything was going to be 3D. But he had always been keen to move to 3D, as it allowed more special effects and would make the game world more alive. In the same year, he decided to release Beneath a Steel Sky (and Lure of the Temptress) as freeware and the source code was given to ScummVM. The result was that millions of people played the game for free on a very wide range of devices. It would foreshadow Revolution's bright future. He could have said that as a marketing genius he planned it, but as he stated a few years later, that would have been a dreadful lie. However, some hard years were ahead for the company. Over the years it had grown into about 40 people, but the year after Broken Sword: The Sleeping Dragon one of Revolution's projects was cancelled, and he had no other option than to let everyone go.

In May 2004 Cecil announced that Revolution would go "back to basics," which meant that Revolution, that had set itself up as both designer and producer of video games, would focus more closely on design. As he stated in various presentations, the situation was caused by the fact that big publishing companies had been controlling for years the supply and demand side of the game market, and little was left for independent developers. Though publishers made tens of millions on the games, Revolution was losing money on every title they produced. In the new situation, he implemented the so-called Hollywood model, in which a producer and director come together and assemble a team to create a movie. For the fourth Broken Sword game, Broken Sword: The Angel of Death (2006), he decided to work with Sumo Digital. They took a number of the former Revolution staff and concentrated on production, while Cecil concentrated on design, story and game play. Because Revolution had received a lot of feedback on the decision to abandon point-and-click, the player was allowed to choose between point-and-click and direct control.

At the end of the decade things changed by innovations such as broadband, new platforms and digital portals. In the new situation game publishers and other middle-men were no longer needed. Revolution could now start to self-publish and the relation with the audience, a relation that Cecil had always valued, could be restored. In March 2009 Broken Sword: Shadow of the Templars – The Director's Cut was published by Ubisoft for the Wii and DS that included new material. In July 2009 Revolution announced on their website a new division, called Revolution Pocket, together with the first title of the new division, Beneath a Steel Sky – Remastered. In the announcement Cecil stated that the digital revolution had changed the game for developers, and that more titles would follow. He had been contacted by Apple to see if he would consider to bring Revolution's classic titles to the App Store, and Cecil on his turn had contacted Dave Gibbons to work on new editions of Beneath a Steel Sky, Broken Sword: The Shadow of the Templars – The Director's Cut and Broken Sword: The Smoking Mirror – Remastered (2010). The release of the first Broken Sword game was celebrated at the Apple Store in London in February 2010. According to Cecil the digital revolution, and in particular the App Store, saved Revolution. As was announced on Revolution's site in December 2011, the dramatic change enabled Revolution to self-fund their next game. Develop, that ranks development studios based on Metacritic data and chart success, ranked Revolution Software in 2011 among the top 50 most successful development studios in the world.

On 23 August 2012 Revolution revealed that they were working on a new Broken Sword game entitled Broken Sword: The Serpent's Curse and they launched a Kickstarter campaign. Though Cecil was approached by a huge publisher to publish a Broken Sword game, Kickstarter was preferred, because they would be able to control development, finances, and marketing. The project was successfully funded within two weeks.

=== Other activities and events ===
Cecil has worked on various games outside Revolution. He was a consultant for The Collective's The Da Vinci Code (2006). Disney approached him to design a game based on A Christmas Carol (Disney's A Christmas Carol, Disney Interactive Studios/Sumo Digital, 2009), and he became the voice of the narrator. A decade earlier he had already been executive producer of Disney's Story Studio: Disney's Mulan, a co-production between Kids Revolution and Disney Interactive (NewKidCo, 1999). He also became executive producer of the BBC/Sumo Digital's episodic adventure game Doctor Who: The Adventure Games (2010). The fifth episode (The Gunpowder Plot) won the British Academy Cymru Award 2012.

Cecil regularly talks at events and to the press about creative and commercial aspects of the video games industry, and is an ambassador for the Yorkshire and UK games industry in general and of course Revolution in particular. He also teaches, gives masterclasses, acts as judge on game proposals and mentors young game designers.

Cecil was a founder of Yorkshire games network Game Republic in 2003, and has been a director on the board. He is a member of the advisory committee for the renewed Game Republic. He has been a member of the steering group and member on the advisory board of Edinburgh Interactive Entertainment Festival, and is on the advisory panel of the Evolve and Develop Conferences. He is also board member of Screen Yorkshire, member of Skillset's Computer Games Skills Council, and a former member of the BFI Board of Governors.

In 2006 Cecil was awarded the status of Development Legend by Develop, Europe's leading development magazine. In 2010 Ed Vaizey, Minister for Culture, Communications and Creative Industries, asked Cecil (together with Ian Livingstone) to be part of an independent review to assess which university courses best prepare graduates with the skills to succeed in the games industry. Cecil was appointed Member of the Order of the British Empire (MBE) in the 2011 Birthday Honours for services to the computer games industry.

=== Revolution's game catalogue ===
Revolution Software quickly established itself as Europe's leading adventure game developer with a string of titles, which have been critically and commercially successful. Clients included Sony Computer Entertainment, Disney, DreamWorks, Virgin Interactive, Sierra Entertainment (Vivendi), Ubisoft, and THQ.

Their first two titles, Lure of the Temptress (published in 1992) and Beneath a Steel Sky (published in 1994) went straight to number one in the GALLUP charts in the UK and topped the charts across most of Europe. Revolution's next title, Broken Sword: Shadow of the Templars (published in 1996) and its sequel Broken Sword 2: The Smoking Mirror (published in 1997) both, in turn, received numerous awards such as best adventure game of the year as well as the best adventure game to date.

Sales of Broken Sword 1 and 2 have made over US$100 million and have sold over three million copies worldwide. Revolution's next game In Cold Blood, published in 2000 by Sony Computer Entertainment, focused on telling stories through action based gameplay and was met with mixed reviews, though it sold very well. Gold and Glory: The Road to El Dorado, based on the DreamWorks film The Road to El Dorado, was released in late 2000. In 2002 Broken Sword: Shadow of the Templars was also published on the Game Boy Advance under the same name, and in 2006 the game was also published for the Palm OS and Pocket PC.

The third game in the Broken Sword series, Broken Sword: The Sleeping Dragon, was released in November 2003 for PC, PlayStation 2, and Xbox. The game sold the same as the previous Broken Sword games and was nominated for 3 BAFTA awards and Best Writing at the Game Developers Conference in 2004. The fourth game, Broken Sword : The Angel of Death was released on PC in September 2006.

In 2009 Broken Sword: Shadow of the Templars – The Director’s Cut was released for the Wii and DS, followed by Beneath a Steel Sky – Remastered for the iPhone. The "Director's Cut" was also released for iOS, Mac, PC (2010), and Android (2012). The game was nominated in the category Story at the British Academy Video Games Awards in 2010. Broken Sword: The Smoking Mirror – Remastered was released in 2010 (iOS, Mac, PC). In 2011 the two Broken Sword games were downloaded by over 4 million people.

=== Personal life ===
Charles Cecil and Noirin Carmody have two children, Ciara and David, who are credited in Broken Sword: The Sleeping Dragon and the new editions of Beneath a Steel Sky and Broken Sword. They all love games, and as his wife works with him as well, family life and work life are completely intertwined. Even their holidays are connected to game design, as they visit places that could feature in a game. Cecil loves history and physics-based science, but also enjoys physical activity, like rowing, competing in regattas, football, and tennis.

=== Quotes on development ===
Cecil believes that game design involves a different creative process as compared to traditional writing. As a writer of a linear story, "all they do is to write the script," he said. "In game design, the writer should think about the gameplay and background story first before developing any of the characters. However, the constraints of an interactive medium is no excuse for a poorly constructed story, the big thing is that we have a different medium. We have to accept that we have not only huge advantages in the interactive medium but also big constraints. And these constraints often lead to some really shitty stories. And that’s why so many games have bad stories."

Cecil is also very serious when doing this research to develop games that have strong ties to historic locales and myths, "I take the historical research and research of our locations very seriously and will generally visit the locations to undertake recces. Of course this is almost always a pleasure – the games aim to feature locations that are exciting and interesting." In the same interview he stated that the name Broken Sword may have been chosen because it is a symbol of peace. He also added that it might have been a fate of history that this name was chosen: "I live in the city of York in England and a few years ago a statue of Constantine the Great was erected next to the cathedral to commemorate his coronation in the city in 306AD. The statue depicts Constantine sitting atop a broken sword; it seemed a fun coincidence, or perhaps it is down to fate."
