= Broken Sword: The Sleeping Dragon =

Adventure game 2003 on Windows, Xbox, and PlayStation 2

- Developer: Revolution Software
- Publishers: EU: THQ; NA: The Adventure Company
- Director: Charles Cecil
- Producers: Mike Gamble; Steve Ince
- Designer: Steve Ince
- Programmers: Andrew Boskett; Francesco Iorio; Patrick Skelton; Chris Stewart
- Artist: Sucha Singh
- Writers: Charles Cecil; Neil Richards
- Composer: Ben McCullough
- Series: Broken Sword
- Engine: RenderWare
- Platforms: Microsoft Windows, Xbox, PlayStation 2
- Release: Microsoft Windows: EU: 14 November 2003; NA: 17 November 2003; Xbox: EU: 14 November 2003; NA: 8 December 2003; PlayStation 2: EU: 14 November 2003
- Genre: Adventure
- Mode: Single-player

Broken Sword: The Sleeping Dragon is an adventure game released on Windows, Xbox, and PlayStation 2 in November 2003. It is the third installment in the Broken Sword series, released six years after the previous instalment, The Smoking Mirror. The Sleeping Dragon moved the series to 3D graphics, and is the only game in the series not to use a point and click interface. The player assumes the role of George Stobbart, an American patent lawyer who flies to the Congo to write a patent for a scientist who claims to have found a source of unlimited energy.

The idea was first discussed in 2000. To make the game feel like a film, Revolution brought in a cinematic consultant, Bob Keen, who made sure the game conveyed emotions and atmosphere appropriate for each scene. The game was originally planned to have similar cartoon-quality visuals as its prequels, but the developers decided to aim at a style similar to Japanese animated films. Unlike the first two Broken Sword games, which used the Virtual Theatre engine, The Sleeping Dragon was built with the RenderWare engine. The game's music was composed by Ben McCullough, and Rolf Saxon returned to voice George Stobbart.

The game has received highly positive reviews. Critics praised the game's story, writing, humour, cinematic feel, and graphics. The game's music was also lauded. Criticism focused primarily on the control interface and repetitive puzzles. According to Charles Cecil, the game sold a few hundred thousand copies.

== Gameplay ==
The gameplay in Broken Sword: The Sleeping Dragon is a departure from previous instalments in the series, using a direct control interface. The player guides George Stobbart's movements with a keyboard or gamepad, while Nicole Collard is also a playable character at certain times. George must collect objects that can be used with other collectable objects, parts of the scenery, or other people in the game world in order to solve puzzles and progress in the game. George can engage in dialogue with other characters through conversation trees to gain hints of what needs to be done to solve the puzzles or to progress the plot. The player has action choices in the bottom right of the screen - there are four circles with anywhere from one to four actions available at any time; the player selects the desired action with the corresponding key. As in the first two Broken Sword games, in The Sleeping Dragon player character death is possible, although the penalty for death is less severe than that of the other two games in that it simply forces the player to repeat the scene where the death occurred rather than wipe unsaved progress.

== Plot ==
Following the events in Smoking Mirror a few years ago, George Stobbart has returned to his life as a lawyer, and finds himself flying to the Congo Basin, alongside his pilot, Harry Gilligan, to meet a scientist by the name of Cholmondely, who claims to have created a machine that can make limitless energy. However, a storm forces the pair's plane to crash land on a cliff-top, close to the scientist's lab. Escaping the wreckage, George makes his way to the lab, arriving just in time to see the scientist gunned down by a pale, lanky man, known as Susarro, and his bodyguard, after being questioned on an unknown subject.

A postcard hidden in the lab prompts George to travel to Glastonbury, England, to search for a man named Bruno, a friend of the scientist who had advised him to flee. In his attempts to find out where Bruno is, he quickly learns that he disappeared before his arrival and is now in danger. Although not knowing where he is exactly, after visiting a fortune teller, George spots a building that caught fire, and goes to deal with it, saving an old man trapped within it. When they chat, he quickly learns that the old man's name is Bruno Ostvald, the scientist he met in the Hotel Ubu in Paris, and a Neo-Templar. Bruno reveals to George that he left the group after the events of Shadows of the Templar, and that they are now led by Susarro, who took over and renamed it the Cult of the Dragon. Susarro is seeking to gain immortality through the use of the Earth's ley lines, which Cholmondely was using in his experiments, and Bruno explains that he is able to track these with a special device he has, believing Susarro may be going to a site in Paris to find something important, prompting the pair to follow after him.

George Stobbart standing in front of Nicole Collard. The player has action choices in the bottom right of the screen - there are 4 circles, and currently 2 options are available: George can converse with or look at Nico.

During these events, in Paris, Nico Collard prepares to meet and interview a hacker named Vernon Blier in his apartment, who recently decoded the Voynich manuscript, but is afraid for his life because of what he found out from it. Vernon is murdered in his home by a woman impersonating Nico, named Petra, just before the former gets there. When the two confront each other inside the apartment, Petra fails to kill Nico, and flees, leaving a few clues behind. Nico quickly tries to find what she needs to prove her innocence, but after the police arrive to investigate the murder, the detective in charge chooses to arrest her, based on the witness account of Vernon's landlady. Following her arrest and subsequent release two days later, Nico decides to find out more about what Vernon had found out, and returns to his apartment, finding his girlfriend, Beatrice, residing inside, still coping with the loss of Vernon. Finding and managing to open a hidden safe, Nico finds diagrams and a DVD, and the latter she plays back at her own apartment before showing it to Andre Lobineau, an old friend of hers, finding it contained a message from Vernon about what he found, believing the bizarre storms happening across the world are a sign of a global catastrophe in the making. Finding out about an abandoned theatre on the Ile St Louis in Paris, connected to a mask the killer had with her when she fled Vernon's murder, Nico heads out to investigate it but gets captured by Petra and her boss, Susarro.

Shortly afterwards, Bruno and George arrive at the same theatre, following Bruno's device to an energy source he was tracing. George decides to break in, finding Susarro, Petra, and Flap (who survived falling out of the train in Shadows of the Templars) interrogating Nico about her investigations; George quickly rescues her when Flap is left on his own with her, knocking him out in the process. After the pair reveal what led them to crossing paths with each other, they decide to continue searching the theatre, looking for the source of the energy Bruno detected. In the process, they find two keys - one in a safe, which is made of stone and decorated with crystals, and was the energy source Bruno detected, while the other, a stone, is found in a weird chamber, within a column of energy, bearing an omega symbol on it. Heading outside, after escaping from Susarro and Petra (who had been dealing with a mysterious, hooded man), George is tazed by an unknown assailant, who takes the strange energy key from him.

Back at Nico's apartment, Bruno reveals that the stolen key was the Key of Solomon; Susarro would need it to access a special armillary in an ancient building, the location of which is unknown. Whilst looking at the Omega Stone, George realises he saw the same symbol, in exactly the same style as the key, in the Congo, leading him and Nico to travel there and investigate. The pair quickly find another stone with the alpha symbol upon it, and manage to evade Petra, who had come after them and the site. Upon returning to Paris, the pair learn that Bruno had been captured whilst Nico's apartment was ransacked, and taken to Prague, leaving Nico to find out where exactly by returning to the abandoned theatre and searching it for clues, quickly finding out that he was taken to a large castle owned by Susarro. Whilst there, they manage to track down Bruno, along with the discovery that the armillary is in Egypt, and that the Key of Solomon was taken by the St. Stefan chapter of the Knights Templar - a surviving remnant of the Templars that still exist, and known to Susarro. He promptly returns to Paris to confront them, while Bruno is taken to Egypt. George decides to track the St. Stefan chapter as well, and returns to Paris and the Montfauçon where they are based, only to arrive too late to stop their base being invaded. Despite finding bodies, George manages to find survivors of the attack, including the Preceptor for the chapter's temple. The Preceptor tasks George with stopping Susarro, revealing the key was taken from them, before handing over a third stone key needed to pinpoint the armillary, bearing a psi symbol on it, and knighting George.

Locating the armillary building in Egypt with the three stone keys, George and Nico sneak into the building, only to see Susarro forcing Bruno to activate the armillary. As it powers up, George and Nico subdue Susarro, just before Petra arrives with the hooded man, who proceeds to kill Susarro with supernatural powers. The figure turns out to be the Grand Master of the Neo-Templars, thought to have been killed back in Bannockburn, but had survived, having Petra work with Susarro until he learnt what the Grand Master needed. With the armillary active and the location of a large power site displayed, the Grand Master sets off dynamite in the building as he escapes with Petra, trapping George, Nico, and Bruno inside and killing Flap. The group find the only way for them to escape is for one of them to sacrifice themselves in one of the puzzle rooms, forcing Bruno to take the responsibility, hoping to atone for past sins so that George and Nico can stop the Grand Master.

George and Nico quickly arrive, by Harry's new plane, at the power site, which had been located in Glastonbury, as bad storms across the world begin to strike; the town is badly flooded when they reach the area. As Nico confronts Petra, George tries to stop the Grand Master, arriving in time to see the Grand Master absorb the energy at the site, turning him into a dragon (while he thought that it would make him immortal) and causing the ground beneath them to collapse. George finds a tomb and a sword in a rock in the cavern he lands in, which he draws (by using the Key of Solomon on the rock) and he uses to slay the dragon and save the world. As Nico arrives to congratulate him, he tells him that Petra disappeared. George then tosses the sword into the floodwaters, expecting a hand to catch it as in the legend of Excalibur. However, the sword merely sinks instead, the pair wondering what the future has in store for them.

== Development ==
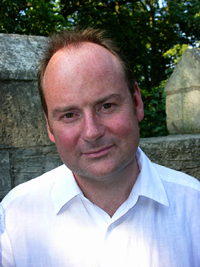
Charles Cecil was the game's director.

Revolution first discussed the idea for the game in 2000. At first, The Sleeping Dragon was planned to have similar cartoon-quality visuals to the first two Broken Sword games; however, Revolution decided not to use the "flat" look, claiming it lacked visual depth. The team wanted the game to look believable, but not necessarily realistic, similar to Japanese animated films.

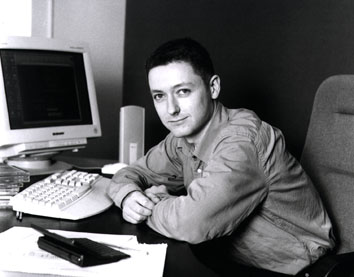
Tony Warriner was the game's AI programmer.

Textures were hand drawn to achieve the "cartoon" look, while the light-map employed radiosity to create realistic lighting. Advances in hardware plus the changes in methodology allowed the game to move to 24-bit colour.

Charles Cecil was the director of the game, and Tony Warriner was responsible for AI programming and some aspects of the game's design. To make the game feel like a film, Revolution brought in a cinematic consultant, Bob Keen, who made sure the game conveyed emotions and atmosphere appropriate for each scene. The music in the game was composed by Ben McCullough. The voice recording was scheduled to take five days; however, the entire process took four days. The voices were recorded with the voice actors together, enabling better acting and interaction. The full script is 6,000 lines in total, similar to Broken Sword II. While Rolf Saxon returned to voice George Stobbart, Nicole "Nico" Collard was played by Sarah Crook.

Revolution held a casting session at a studio called The Spotlight (in Leicester Square in London), in which multiple parts were auditioned for by multiple actors. Originally, Nico was planned to be voiced by a native French speaker, to get the right accent, but she ended up being voiced by Sarah Crook, a native English speaker. The rest of the credited voice actors were Alison Pettit, Andrew Secombe, Bob Golding, Jay Benedict, John Bull, Laurence Bouvard, Peter Marinker, Rachael Rogers, Rachel Preece, Simon Treves, and Seamus O'Neil.

Cecil stated in an interview that the development costs were £2 million. Warriner noted that the game was significantly more expensive than its earlier projects, and cost "another US$1 million over BS1". Though the game made $40 million, as a developer Revolution suffered a massive loss.

Although the PlayStation 2 and Xbox versions are no longer available, the PC version may be purchased from Steam, Mastertronic and GOG.com, and is also a part of the Broken Sword Complete package from Mastertronic.

== Reception ==
Reception

Aggregate score
Aggregator	Score
Metacritic	82/100

Review scores
Publication	Score
Adventure Gamers	4/5
Computer Games Magazine	3.5/5
Edge	9/10
GameSpot	8.1/10
IGN	8.4/10
eToychest	5/5
Game Chronicles	9.2/10
Game Over Online	71/100

The Sleeping Dragon received highly positive reviews from most critics and sold a few hundred thousand copies. Summarizing the game's performance compared to the first two Broken Sword entries, Tony Warriner said in 2004: "[I]t sold more or less the same, and to the same people. We didn't widen the market as we had hoped". In a 2006 interview, Cecil admitted that the game had included too many crate puzzles that acted as a blocking mechanism, rather than furthering the plot.

eToychest gave the game a 5 out of 5, saying that "Broken Sword: The Sleeping Dragon is a shining example of what this genre is capable of, and it comes as close to perfection as any recent adventure game has". Just Adventure gave the game an A+, saying: "A triumph. It's at the same time a real 3D game and a crackerjack pure adventure. High levels of craftsmanship and designer TLC are evident throughout the game. Playing it is like falling into an exciting movie thriller". Gaming Chronicles gave it a 9.2 out of 10, saying that "adventure gaming is alive and well thanks to designers like Revolution" and that it's a stunning achievement in interactive entertainment, praising its story, characters, visuals, and dialogue, and calling it a "must-own title for anyone looking to relive the golden era of adventure gaming"; they did, however, indicate that the controls were too easy at times. Edge gave the game a 9, praising the storytelling, dialogues and visuals, and while pointing out some sporadic glitches that break the illusion, Edge refers to this game as "a fairytale comeback" and "the adventure's glorious return". IGN gave the game a rating of 8.4, placing it under the "Impressive" category, but noted that the interface was difficult to use and the puzzles in the game were repetitive. Adventure Gamers gave it 4 out of 5 stars, called it a "technical masterpiece", and praised its cinematic introduction, cutscenes, lifelike character faces, and said "it certainly raise[s] the bar for any seen in adventures to this date", but criticised its controls and repetitive puzzles. GameSpot had an overall positive review; Scott Osborne praised its plot, characters, and setting, and (unlike most) found the interface to have its points, although he was frustrated with times in which quick reflexes are required and bored (like most) with some of the puzzles; he also ran into a sound problem, which does not appear to have happened to any other reviewer. Although Laura MacDonald of Mr. Bill's Adventureland panned its repetitive puzzles, she called it an "instant classic" and praised its story, controls, characters and music. Steven Carter of Game Over Online was less positive (criticising its plot, interface, and puzzles – calling most of the last "trivially easy"), but did praise its general appearance, voice acting, and music. Computer Games Magazine was less positive, mainly due to heavily criticising the interface.

The editors of Computer Gaming World nominated The Sleeping Dragon version for their 2003 "Adventure Game of the Year" award, which ultimately went to Uplink: Hacker Elite. It was likewise a runner-up in The Electric Playground's "Best Adventure Game for PC" category, but lost this prize to Beyond Good & Evil.

== See also ==
- Dreamfall: The Longest Journey
- Runaway: A Road Adventure
- Syberia
