= Broken Sword =

Video game series

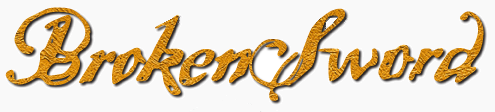
- Genres: Point-and-click adventure Adventure
- Developer: Revolution Software (in partnership with Sumo Digital in 2006)
- Creator: Charles Cecil
- Platforms: Android, Game Boy Advance, iOS, Linux, Mac OS, Nintendo DS, Nintendo Switch, Palm OS, PlayStation, PlayStation 2, PlayStation 4, PlayStation Vita, Wii, Windows, Windows Mobile, Xbox, Xbox One
- First release: Broken Sword: The Shadow of the Templars; September 30, 1996
- Latest release: Broken Sword - Shadow of the Templars: Reforged; September 19, 2024

Broken Sword is a series of adventure games. The first game in the series, Broken Sword: The Shadow of the Templars, was released and developed in 1996 by British developer Revolution Software. Its sequel, Broken Sword II: The Smoking Mirror, was released a year later, and was followed by Broken Sword: The Sleeping Dragon in 2003, Broken Sword: The Angel of Death in 2006, and Broken Sword 5: The Serpent's Curse in 2013. A remake of the first game in the series, known as Broken Sword: Shadow of the Templars – The Director's Cut, was released in 2009, and a remake of the second game in the series, Broken Sword: The Smoking Mirror – Remastered, in 2010 for iOS devices; other platforms followed in 2011.

The main protagonists of the series are George Stobbart, an American patent lawyer, and Nicole "Nico" Collard, a French freelance journalist. While Nico does not appear as a playable character in the original version of The Shadow of the Templars, she does become playable in the Director's Cut.

The Broken Sword series was conceived in 1994 by Charles Cecil, Noirin Carmody and Sean Brennan, while talking about the mythology of the Knights Templar. The first three games in the series as well as the fifth game were developed by Revolution Software, while the fourth game was co-developed by Revolution and Sumo Digital. The Shadow of the Templars and The Smoking Mirror were critical and commercial successes, selling millions. However, The Sleeping Dragon and The Angel of Death received mixed reviews and were not as popular as the first two games. This was mainly due to the switch to 3D graphics and because the third game left the "point and click" interface for a more action-oriented gameplay. The latest game in the series, The Serpent's Curse, returned to the series' 2D roots. The series appeared on several top adventure game lists. A comic book was produced for each remake of the first two Broken Sword games.

== Games ==
Game
Game	Release year	Developer	Platforms
Broken Sword: The Shadow of the Templars	1996	Revolution Software	Windows, Mac OS, Linux, PlayStation, Game Boy Advance, Palm OS, Wii, Nintendo DS, iOS, Android
The Shadow of the Templars, known as Circle of Blood in North America, is the first game in the series, and developed by Revolution Software. Originally released in 1996 on Windows, Mac OS and PlayStation, the game was later ported on Game Boy Advance and Palm OS, then re-released with new content as Shadow of the Templars the director's cut first on Wii and Nintendo DS and later ported on Windows, Mac OS X, Linux, iOS and Android. In The Shadow of the Templars, the player assumes the role of George Stobbart – a young American who is an eyewitness and victim of a bomb attack on a small Parisian café. It garnered critical acclaim and sold around one million units.
Broken Sword II: The Smoking Mirror	1997	Revolution Software	Windows, PlayStation, Mac OS, iOS, Android, Linux
With the success of The Shadow of the Templars, Revolution began work on The Smoking Mirror, which was released a year later. Originally released on Windows and PlayStation, it was re-released on Windows, Mac OS X, Linux, iOS and Android as a remastered edition. It is the only game in the series not to involve the Knights Templar. The Smoking Mirror was a commercial success, selling around one million units, but was not as acclaimed as the first game.
Broken Sword: The Sleeping Dragon	2003	Revolution Software	Windows, Xbox, PlayStation 2
The third game, The Sleeping Dragon, was a departure from the gameplay style of previous games in the series, featuring 3D graphics, and the only game in the series to use a direct control interface. It continues the story of The Shadow of the Templars. The game received highly positive reviews from critics and sold several hundred thousand copies.
Broken Sword: The Angel of Death	2006	Revolution Software, Sumo Digital	Windows
The fourth installment in the series, The Angel of Death, was co-developed by Revolution and Sumo Digital. While the game featured 3D graphics, it returned to the point and click interface. It sold several hundred thousand copies but received mixed reviews.
Broken Sword 5: The Serpent's Curse	2013-2014	Revolution Software	Windows, OS X, Linux, iOS, TvOS, Android, PlayStation Vita, PlayStation 4, Xbox One, Nintendo Switch
The fifth Broken Sword game, The Serpent's Curse, is the first installment to receive its funding from Kickstarter during its conception. Released in December 2013, the game returned to the series' 2D roots.
Broken Sword: Parzival's Stone	TBA	Revolution Software	Windows, OS X, Linux, iOS, Android, Consoles
The sixth Broken Sword game, Parzival's Stone, was announced during the Xbox Gamescom conference in 2023.

== Story overview ==
In The Shadow of the Templars, American George Stobbart is touring Europe. He becomes both a witness and victim of a bomb attack on a Parisian café "La Chandelle Verte", caused by a clown, later revealed to be an assassin named Khan. The perpetrator steals an old man's briefcase and sets off a bomb inside the café. Stobbart meets a French photo-journalist, Nicole "Nico" Collard, a resident of Rue Jarry in Paris, with whom he tries to discover who is responsible for the murder of the old man, Plantard, and while doing so, end up unraveling a conspiracy relating to the Knights Templar. The third and fourth game, The Sleeping Dragon and The Angel of Death, follow the Templar-related storyline: The Sleeping Dragon continuing the story from The Shadow of the Templars with a number of returning characters, while in The Angel of Death, George and Nico, with a newly introduced character Anna-Maria, unravel a mystery related to the Catholic Church. Unlike the other installments, in The Smoking Mirror, George and Nico unravel an Aztec mystery, involving the Aztec god Tezcatlipoca. The Serpent's Curse follows a storyline related to the Gnostic Gospels.

== Development ==
=== The Shadow of the Templars and The Smoking Mirror ===
Video game designer, writer and director Charles Cecil began working on the scenario for Broken Sword, Revolution Software's third game following Lure of the Temptress (1992) and Beneath a Steel Sky (1994), in 1992, which would be set in Paris with a Knights Templar storyline. After visiting Paris and reading The Holy Blood and the Holy Grail, Cecil was certain the Templars would be a good subject for a game. Cecil, Dave Cummins and Jonathan L. Howard began work on the story and design. Cecil and Cummins attended a film-writing course and their script was read by senior BBC scriptwriter and dramatist Alan Drury. Steve Ince, who created initial location sketches for the game before working on Beneath a Steel Sky, was promoted to producer halfway through the project. In 1994 Cecil and Noirin Carmody met with Sean Brennan, then-head of publishing at Virgin Interactive, and Virgin agreed to publish the game's PC version, but were not interested in publishing the game on the PlayStation, feeling that only 3D games would sell for the console. As a result, Cecil contacted Sony Computer Entertainment, who agreed to publish the game for the console. Tony Warriner and David Sykes were the game's designer-programmer Carmody the executive producer. The game uses the Virtual Theatre engine, as do Revolution's previous two games.

One of Cecil's goals was to depart from the humour-based adventure games more popular at the time by creating a game with good pacing and a complex storyline, a reason he thought the Knights Templar would be an ideal subject. Broken Sword offered a unique "conversation icon" system which would not reveal to the player what the protagonist was about to say; Cecil's intention was to make the game more cinematic. Although aiming at designing a game with a cinematic feel, Cecil felt the game should not resemble interactive movies of that time, which he felt were "mimicking movies". He wanted to create two protagonists who would exchange ideas, helping drive the game along. He made George American and Nico French to appeal to US and European markets. Revolution believed they needed to utilise the best of other creative industries. Hand drawn artwork was animated by artists including Don Bluth Studios' Eoghan Cahill and Neil Breen and Red Rover Studio's Mike Burgess, resulting in graphics animated in a style resembling classic animated films. The game's final cost was one million pounds.

Broken Sword II: The Smoking Mirror was conceived in 1997, by Cecil and Revolution's crew. The artwork for Broken Sword 2 was developed through a number of stages. Initially pencil drawings were made of characters which were then digitally coloured in, before being cleaned up. The background layouts were produced in a similar way, also starting out as pencil designs. They were all drawn by Eoghan Cahill and Cornelius Breen (as Neil Breen), who both previously worked on the original Broken Sword game, while they were now working together with Amy Berenz and Lee Taylor. The music in the game was again composed by Barrington Pheloung, with Bob Sekar adding the closing score. While Rolf Saxon returns to voice actor of George, Jennifer Caron Hall a bilingual actress and daughter of French actress Leslie Caron, was cast as Nico. Theatre director Edward Hall rehearsed the assembled actors and took no more than a week to record the entire game, according to an interview given by Rolf Saxon in 2011. Alternative Magazine The game was first released for Windows on October 31, 1997.

=== The Sleeping Dragon and The Angel of Death ===
Revolution first discussed the idea of a third Broken Sword in 2000. At first, The Sleeping Dragon was planned to have similar cartoon-quality visuals to the first two Broken Sword games, but Revolution decided not to use the "flat" look, claiming it lacked visual depth. The team wanted the game to look believable, but not necessarily realistic, similar to Japanese animated films. Textures were hand drawn to achieve the "cartoon" look, while the light-map employed radiosity to create realistic lighting. Advances in hardware plus the changes in methodology allowed the game to move to 24-bit color. To make the game feel like a film, Revolution brought in a cinematic consultant, Bob Keen, who made sure the game conveyed emotions and atmospheres appropriate for each scene. The music in the game was composed by Ben McCullough. The voice recording was scheduled to take five days, but the entire process took four days. The voices were recorded with the voice actors together, enabling better getting into their parts. The full script is 6,000 lines in total, similar to Broken Sword II. While Rolf Saxon returns to voice George, Nico was this time played by Sarah Crook. The game's final cost was two million pounds.

Revolution Software and THQ announced Broken Sword: The Angel of Death in August 2005. According to Charles Cecil, the Broken Sword was originally planned to be a trilogy, but after the release of Broken Sword: The Sleeping Dragon, the demand from fans for a sequel was overwhelming. Though The Sleeping Dragon benefited commercially from being released on console as well as PC, this approach required certain development compromises as the PC version was held back by the constraints of the console versions. As a result, The Angel of Death was written for PC only "so as to really push the boundaries in terms of the technology and graphics". As a series' first, Revolution was not the only developer, but was co-developed by Revolution and Sumo Digital. Cecil believed that because of the requirement for ever larger team sizes, it was no longer possible to maintain a large development team to write single original titles, resulting in Revolution closed the production side in order to concentrate on design, and Sumo to concentrate on production. It was the first game to use the amBX lighting technology. Broken Sword: The Sleeping Dragon was criticised for featuring a high number of action elements. Cecil stated that he aimed to put the player under pressure. While he still stood behind this principle, he thought the action elements were not the right approach. The Sleeping Dragon was also criticised for using a high number of crate puzzles, resulting in Cecil reducing the number of them. The music in the game was composed by Ben McCullough and features tracks by Übernoise. While Rolf Saxon returns to voice George Stobbart, Nicole "Nico" Collard was this time played by Katherine Pageon.

=== The Shadow of the Templars – Director's Cut and The Smoking Mirror – Remastered ===
On March 21, 2009, Ubisoft released a special edition of The Shadow of the Templars for the Wii and Nintendo DS. According to Cecil, the Director's Cut came about thanks to a group of Broken Sword fans, who started an online petition begging him to bring the series to the Wii and DS.

When considering the project, Cecil played the game again and noticed many issues, including that backgrounds were pixelated, the movies and audio were of poor quality, and he also felt some dialogue was out of place. He thought all these elements could be addressed and improved in a remastered edition, in which they could add a diary, hint system, and new artwork from Dave Gibbons, which they could offer as an interactive digital comic.

The game starts a day before the Parisian cafe explosion in the original game, filling in some of Nicole Collard's back-story. Gibbons, with whom Revolution worked previously on their 1994 cult classic adventure Beneath a Steel Sky, worked on visual references for the game; he also produced a comic book to accompany the game's DS release.

Hazel Ellerby returns to voice Nicole Collard in the new sections, playing Nico again for the first time since the original game's release. Rolf Saxon, as in every sequel, also returns to voice George Stobbart. Unlike in the original game, players control Nicole Collard for selected game sections. Besides the new character artwork by Gibbons during conversations, the Director's Cut also features a new first person view for certain puzzles. In the DS version, there is no spoken dialogue, only subtitles.

A version for iPhone and iPod Touch was released on January 20, 2010. Later in May, a version with higher resolution and a digital comic was released on the iPad. A PC version was released on August 27 on various digital distribution services.

Broken Sword: The Smoking Mirror – Remastered for Apple iOS devices was released on December 16, 2010. The new features include an exclusive interactive digital comic from Dave Gibbons, fully animated facial expressions, enhanced graphics, high quality music, a context-sensitive hint system, diary, and a Dropbox integration which facilitates a unique cross-platform save-game feature, enabling players to enjoy the same adventure simultaneously on multiple devices. It also featured full Game Center integration – including in-game achievements. The Mac and PC versions followed in early 2011.

=== The Serpent's Curse ===
A fifth title in the series, Broken Sword 5: The Serpent's Curse, was in development for six months and returned to the series' 2D graphical style; it was released in 2013. Cecil said that, despite interest from the "industry's biggest third party publisher", funding for the game's remaining development was sought via Kickstarter with a target of $400,000. It received its funding of $771,561 in September 2012.

=== Remaster Test by Tony Warriner ===
In August 2021, Tony Warriner did a test run to see how Broken Sword 1 would look as a remastered game, and was kind enough to share the screenshots with Pixel Refresh.

=== Shadow of the Templars Reforged ===
At Gamescom 2023 Microsoft announced a remaster of the original Broken Sword. The original game has been remastered in 4K resolution using a mixture of AI tools and brand new hand-painted background art. The game also includes new features, such as one that removes incorrect items used in puzzles if the players have used it once already, in order to guide the player to the correct answers. The reforged game was released on September 19, 2024. It is based on the original game, not the director's cut.

=== Parzival's Stone ===
Also at the Gamescom 2023 Microsoft event a new game in the series was announced, entitled Parzival's Stone. It will feature a "Super 2D" visual design using hand-painted background art imposed onto three-dimensional scenes to make the game's scenes feel more cinematic and believable.

== Reception and legacy ==
Aggregate review scores As of May 2, 2013.
Game	GameRankings	Metacritic
The Shadow of the Templars	(PC) 84.40% (GBA) 81.19% (PS1) 80.83%	(PC) 80/100 (GBA) 80/100
The Smoking Mirror	(iOS) 79.00% (PS1) 73.09% (PC) 70.50%	(iOS) 84/100 (PC) 69/100
The Sleeping Dragon	(PC) 82.53% (Xbox) 77.15% (PS2) 62.00%	(PC) 82/100 (Xbox) 77/100
The Angel of Death	(PC) 75.03%	(PC) 73/100
The Shadow of the Templars – Director's Cut	(iOS) 94.00% (HD) 86.67% (NDS) 80.87% (Wii) 76.15% (PC) 60.00%	(iOS) 91/100 (HD) 84/100 (NDS) 78/100 (Wii) 74/100
The Serpent's Curse	(XONE) 74.18% (PS4) 73.56%	(XONE) 77/100 (PS4) 72/100

=== Sales and critical reception ===
The Broken Sword franchise is Europe's most successful adventure series, selling six million units; The Shadow of the Templars and The Smoking Mirror are Revolution's best-selling titles, each selling a million copies. With the decline of the adventure genre at the beginning of the 2000s, sales of the Broken Sword series decreased as well, with The Sleeping Dragon and The Angel of Death selling a few hundred thousand copies. During the so-called "adventure renaissance", the two Broken Sword remakes were met with success; in 2011, the Director's Cut and The Smoking Mirror: Remastered sold 500,000 copies on the iOS alone. By 2005, before the release of Broken Sword 4, the series had shipped above 2.5 million units to retailers worldwide.

The series' installments have received positive reviews, with The Shadow of the Templars often being cited as a classic in the adventure genre, ranking high on various "top" lists. The remakes were met with acclaim, most notably the iOS versions, often called one of the best games on the platform.

=== Other media ===
In May 2007, Charles Cecil was interested in making a film based on the game franchise.

Dave Gibbons produced comics for each remake of the first two Broken Sword games; Broken Sword: The Shadow of the Templars – Director's Cut, and Broken Sword: The Smoking Mirror – Remastered.

In September 2008, mindFactory released a fan-made freeware Broken Sword game, called Broken Sword 2.5: The Return of the Templars.

=== Awards and nominations ===
Year	Publication or ceremony	Nominated game	Award	Result	Ref.
1997	Generation 4	Broken Sword: The Shadow of the Templars	Best Adventure 1997	Won	
1997	Quest magazine	Broken Sword: The Shadow of the Templars	Best Quest	Won	
2003	British Academy Video Games Awards	Broken Sword: The Sleeping Dragon	Best Design	Nominated	
2003	British Academy Video Games Awards	Broken Sword: The Sleeping Dragon	Best PC Game	Nominated	
2003	British Academy Video Games Awards	Broken Sword: The Sleeping Dragon	Best Adventure Game	Nominated	
2003	Just Adventure	Broken Sword: The Sleeping Dragon	Best Adventure Game of 2003	Won	
2004	Game Developers Choice Awards	Broken Sword: The Sleeping Dragon	Excellence in Writing	Nominated	
2009	British Academy Video Games Awards	Broken Sword: The Shadow of the Templars – Director's Cut	Best Story	Nominated	
2010	Pocket Gamer	Broken Sword: The Shadow of the Templars – Director's Cut	Pocket Gamer Gold Award	Won	
2010	Pocket Gamer	Broken Sword: The Smoking Mirror – Remastered	Pocket Gamer Silver Award	Won	
2010	Adventure Gamers' 2009 Aggie Awards	Broken Sword: The Shadow of the Templars – Director's Cut	Best Port/Updated Re-release	Nominated	
2011	Pocket Gamer Awards	Broken Sword: The Shadow of the Templars – Director's Cut	Best Adventure/RPG Game	Nominated	
2011	European Games Awards	Broken Sword: The Shadow of the Templars – Director's Cut	Best European Adventure	Won	
