= Comical History of the States and Empires of the Moon =

1657 novel by Cyrano de Bergerac

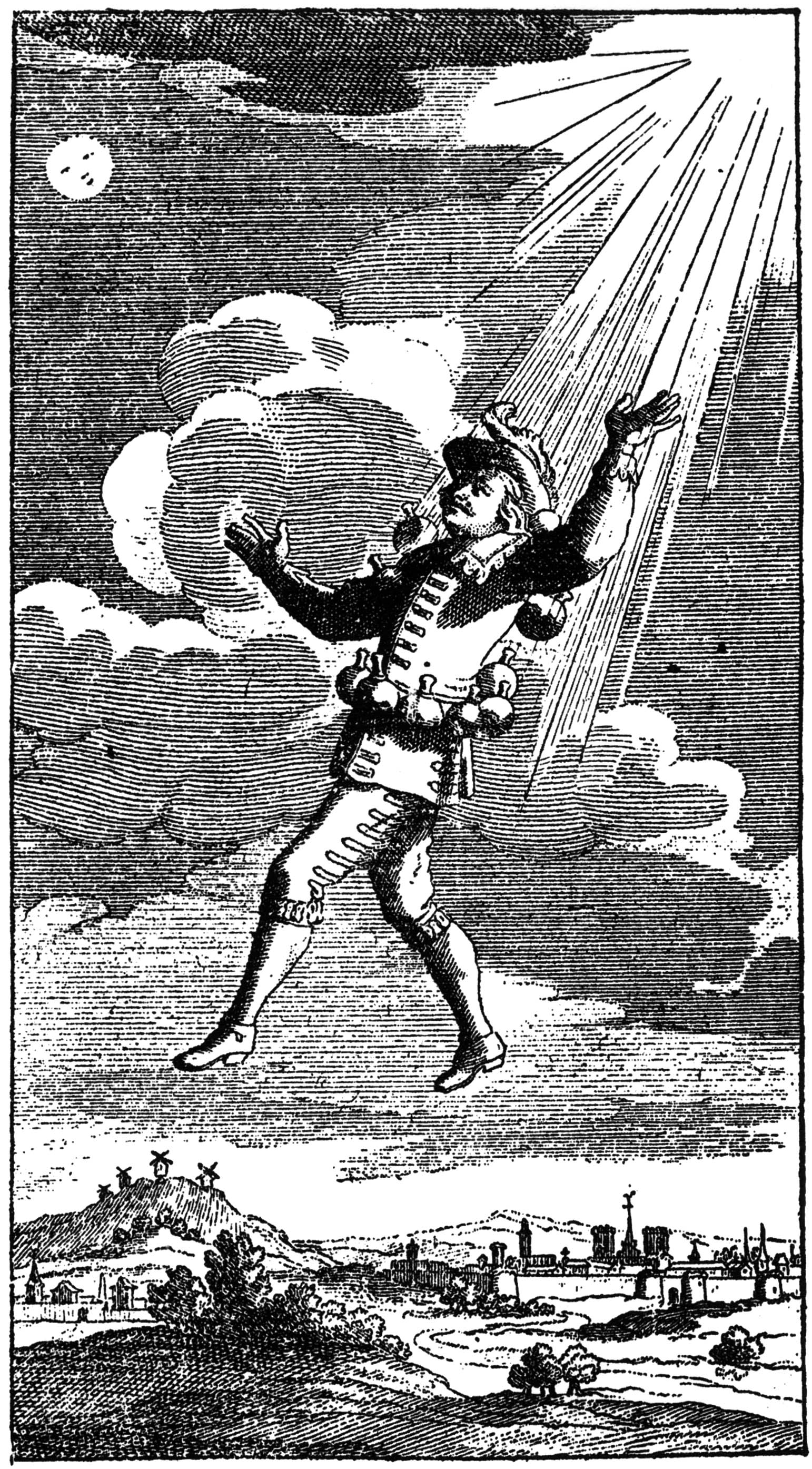
- Cyrano uses bottles of dew to float upwards. Illustration from the second volume of an edition of Cyrano de Bergerac's complete works printed in Amsterdam in 1708
- Author: Cyrano de Bergerac
- Original title: L'Autre monde ou les états et empires de la Lune
- Language: French
- Genre: science fiction
- Published: 1657
- Publication place: France
- Followed by: The States and Empires of the Sun

The Other World: Comical History of the States and Empires of the Moon (French: L'Autre monde ou les états et empires de la Lune) was the first of three satirical novels written by Cyrano de Bergerac. It was published posthumously in 1657 and, along with its companion work The States and Empires of the Sun, is considered one of the earliest published science fiction stories. Arthur C. Clarke credited the book with the first description of rocket-powered spaceflight, and with the invention of the ramjet.

In the novel, a character also named Cyrano is determined to reach the Earth's Moon and to see its civilization. His first attempt at spaceflight is a failure, as he merely flies from Paris to New France. In conversation with a local governor, Cyrano explains his belief that the Sun will eventually run out of fuel, and that its death will also destroy the planets of the Solar System. His second attempt at flight results in a crashlanding, but local soldiers improve his flying machine and consequently Cyrano reaches the Moon on his third attempt. He meets a local civilization whose naming conventions are based on musical notes. Cyrano soon meets the ghost of the philosopher Socrates and the previous space traveler Domingo Gonsales (a character from the older novel The Man in the Moone). In a philosophical dialogue, the two space travelers establish that God does not exist and that the concept of a God is useless to humans, that immortality can never be achieved by humans, and that human souls do not exist.

== Plot summary ==
The book is narrated in the first person by Cyrano, who attempts to reach the Moon to prove there is a civilization that sees the Earth as its own moon. He launches himself into the sky from Paris by strapping bottles of dew to his body, but lands back on Earth. Believing he had traveled straight up and down, he is confused by local soldiers who tell him he is not in France; they escort him to the provincial governor who informs him that it is in fact New France. The narrator explains to the governor that all matter is formed inside and expelled from stars, and that once the Sun has run out of fuel it will consume the planets and restart the cycle. He uses New France as evidence for this theory, claiming that it had only recently been discovered by European explorers because the Sun had only recently sent it to Earth.

The narrator tries again to reach the Moon, this time with a flying machine that he launches off the edge of a cliff. Though the craft crashes, local soldiers attach rockets to it, hoping that it will fly to celebrate St. John's Day (24 June). Dismayed at this use of his machine, the narrator attempts to dismantle it while the fuse is lit, but the machine takes off and sends him into space. He meets the Moon's inhabitants, who have four legs, musical voices, and fantastical weapons that cook game for a meal as it is shot. The Moon inhabitants give names made of musical notes. For example, the king's name was given as

The narrative reveals that the Moon inhabitants greatly prize having a large nose, "because after Thirty Ages experience we have observed, that a great Nose is the mark of a Witty, Courteous, Affable, Generous and Liberal Man; and that a little Nose is a Sign of the contrary". Rostand further develops the "great nose" subject in his Cyrano de Bergerac play.

Cyrano encounters the ghost of Socrates, and Domingo Gonsales, a character from Francis Godwin's The Man in the Moone. Dialogues between Cyrano and Gonsales prove to the reader that God is useless as a concept; that humans cannot achieve immortality; and that they do not possess souls. After finishing these discussions, the narrator returns to Earth.

== Impact ==
Inspired by Lucian's proto-science fiction work True History or True Story, The Other World went on to influence many other works seen as early science fiction, including Jonathan Swift's novel Gulliver's Travels, which is also an example of fantastic voyages exploring both contemporary social commentary, and some ideas of the unknown and "modern" science.

The French comic book series De cape et de crocs, created by writer Alain Ayroles and artist Jean-Luc Masbou, draws inspiration from The Other World and makes frequent references to the work and its author.

== See also ==
- History of science fiction
- Baron Munchausen
- Tall tale
- Gulliver’s Travels
