= Bruno Maïorana =

French cartoonist and illustrator (born 1966)

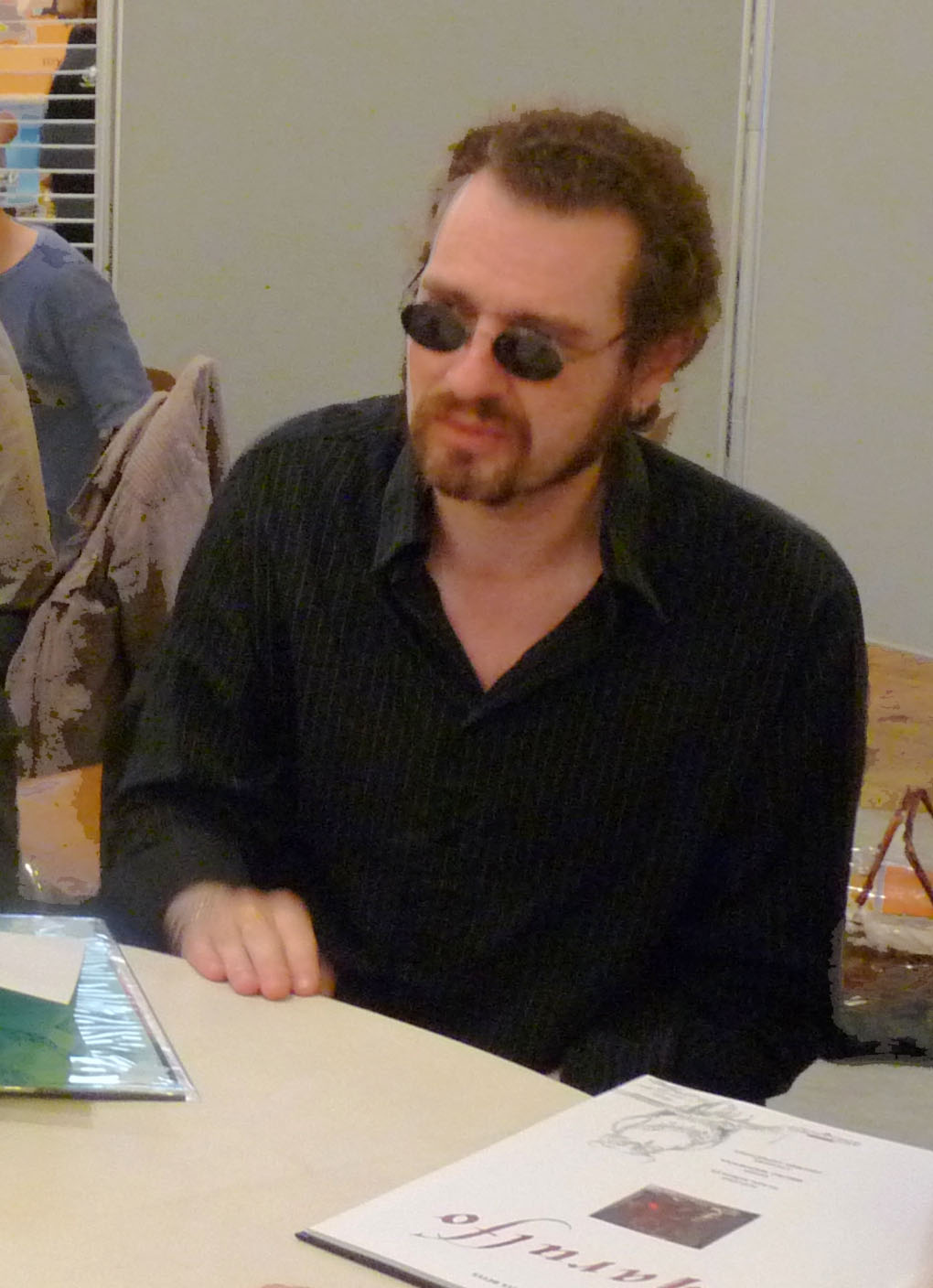
- Born: 23 December 1966 (age 59) Angouleme, France
- Areas: Writer, Artist
- Notable works: Garulfo; D
- Collaborators: Alain Ayroles; Thierry Leprévost

Bruno Maïorana (born 23 December 1966) is a French cartoonist and illustrator who quit the comics industry in 2014, at the height of his popularity.

== Biography ==
After high school Bruno Maïorana enrolled in the fine art school in Angoulême, where he met future collaborators Alain Ayroles and Thierry Leprévost, to major in comic art. However, Maïorana dropped-out before graduation to work as an illustrator at animation studio IDDH, where Ayroles, Jean-Luc Masbou and Leprévost would also work for a time. Maïorana's first graphic novel project, Garulfo, was based on Ayroles idea to turn a classic fairy tale on its head. Originally, Ayroles intended to illustrate the story himself, however, editors advised him to find someone to collaborate with as the draft boards he had presented to them did not meet approval. After Ayroles had approached Maïorana for his collaboration, Guy Delcourt (editor) agreed to publish the series which ran from 1995 to 2002. The series proved a commercial and critical success but ended after only six albums. By 2014, the series had sold around 300,000 copies.

Maïorana's second, and final, graphic novel project began in 2009 when he teamed up with Alain Ayroles once more to illustrate D, a gothic tale of Vampires in Victorian London, published by Guy Delcourt.

Despite the success of both series and having shared his concerns over the future of the trade with fans, he announced in 2014 via his Facebook page that he was quitting the comics industry for good. The reason for this high-profile departure Maïorana put down to the deadline-driven system of remuneration, whereby each page or board has to be delivered with a certain timeframe, regardless of the amount of work it might require. He now specialises on "pure" illustration, working in black pen on white

== Bibliography ==
=== Garulfo ===
Written by Alain Ayroles, colors by Thierry Leprévost.

- 1 Maïorana, Bruno (1995). De mares en châteaux [From ponds to castles] (in French). Paris: Delcourt. ISBN 2-84055-045-8.
- 2 Maïorana, Bruno (1996). De mal en pis [From bad to worse] (in French). Paris: Delcourt. ISBN 2-84055-087-3.
- 3 Maïorana, Bruno (1997). Le prince aux deux visages [The Prince with Two Faces] (in French). Paris: Delcourt. ISBN 978-2-84055-139-3.
- 4 Maïorana, Bruno (1998). L'ogre aux yeux de cristal [The Ogre with Crystal Eyes] (in French). Paris: Delcourt. ISBN 978-2-84055-237-6.
- 5 Maïorana, Bruno (2000). Preux et prouesse [Knights and Prowess] (in French). Paris: Delcourt. ISBN 2-84055-334-1.
- 6 Maïorana, Bruno (2002). La belle et les bêtes [Beauty and the Beasts] (in French). Paris: Delcourt. ISBN 978-2-84055-579-7.

=== D ===
Illustrated by Alain Ayroles, colors by Thierry Leprévost

- 1 Maïorana, Bruno (2009). Lord Faureston [Lord Faureston] (in French). Paris: Delcourt. ISBN 978-2-7560-0412-9.
- 2 Maïorana, Bruno (2011). Lady d'Angerès [Lady d'Angere] (in French). Paris: Delcourt. ISBN 978-2-7560-1960-4.
- 3 Maïorana, Bruno (2014). Monsieur Caulard [Mr Caulard] (in French). Paris: Delcourt. ISBN 978-2-7560-1960-4.

=== Artbooks ===
- Maïorana, Bruno (2013). Carnet d'auteur (in French). Marseille: Snorgleux. ISBN 978-2-36014-042-8.
- Maïorana, Bruno (2019). Drawing (in French). Roeschwoog: Black and White. ISBN 979-10-94988-45-9.
