= Angoulême International Comics Festival Prize for a Series =

The Prize for a Series is one of the prizes awarded by the Angoulême International Comics Festival. This prize was first awarded in 2004, then after two more years was cancelled. It was reinstated in 2010 and has been awarded ever since.

- 2004: 20th Century Boys by Naoki Urasawa (Panini Comics/Génération Comics)
  - Bételgeuse by Léo (Dargaud)
  - Black Hole by Charles Burns (Delcourt)
  - Bouncer (bande dessinée) by François Boucq & Alejandro Jodorowsky (Les Humanoïdes Associés)
  - Donjon by Joann Sfar & Lewis Trondheim (Delcourt)
  - Sambre by Yslaire (Glénat)
  - Stéphane Clément, chroniques d'un voyageur by Daniel Ceppi (Requins Marteaux)
- 2005: Les Formidables Aventures de Lapinot by Lewis Trondheim (Dargaud)
  - Buddy Longway by Derib (Le Lombard)
  - Le Cri du peuple (bande dessinée) by Jacques Tardi and Jean Vautrin (Casterman)
  - Coq de combat by Izo Hashimoto and Akio Tanaka (Delcourt)
  - Daredevil by Brian Michael Bendis and Alex Maleev (Marvel Comics)
  - Un privé à la cambrousse by Bruno Heitz (Seuil)
  - Universal War One by Denis Bajram (Soleil)
- 2006: Blacksad: Ame rouge by Juanjo Guarnido and Juan Diaz Canales (Dargaud)
  - Black Hole: Bleu profond by Charles Burns (Delcourt)
  - Bone: La couronne d’aiguilles by Jeff Smith (Delcourt)
  - Bouncer (bande dessinée): La vengeance du manchot by François Boucq and Alexandro Jodorowsky (Les Humanoïdes Associés)
  - Lupus (bande dessinée) part 3 by Frederik Peeters (Atrabile)
  - Pascin: La java bleue by Joann Sfar (l’Association)
  - Théodore Poussin: Les jalousies by Frank Le Gall (Dupuis)
- 2010: Jérôme K. Jérôme Bloche by Alain Dodier (Dupuis)
- 2011: Il était une fois en France by Fabien Nury and Sylvain Vallée (Glénat)
- 2012: Cité 14 by Pierre Gabus and Romuald Reutimann (Les Humanoïdes Associés)
- 2013: Aâma by Frederik Peeters (Gallimard)
- 2014: Fuzz & Pluck t.2: Splitsville by Ted Stearn (Cornélius)
- 2015: Lastman, t.6 by Bastien Vivès, Balak, & Michaël Sanlaville (KSTR/Casterman)
- 2016: Miss Marvel by Adrian Alphona & G. Willow Wilson (Panini Comics)
- 2017: Chiisakobee by Minetarō Mochizuki (Le Lézard noir)
- 2018: Megg, Mogg & Owl by Simon Hanselmann (Misma)
- 2019: Dansker by Halfdan Pisket (Presque lune)
- 2020: Dans l'Abîme du temps by Gō Tanabe after H. P. Lovecraft (Ki-oon)
- 2021: Paul à la maison by Michel Rabagliati
- 2022: Spirou ou l'espoir malgré tout by Émile Bravo (Dupuis)
- 2023: Blood on the Tracks by Shūzō Oshimi (Ki-oon)
- 2024: The Nice House on the Lake by Álvaro Martínez Bueno & James Tynion IV (Urban Comics)
