= Guy Delcourt =

Guy Delcourt may refer to:

- Guy Delcourt (editor) (born 1958), French publisher
- Guy Delcourt (politician) (1947–2020), French politician
