= Juanjo Guarnido =

Spanish illustrator (born 1967)

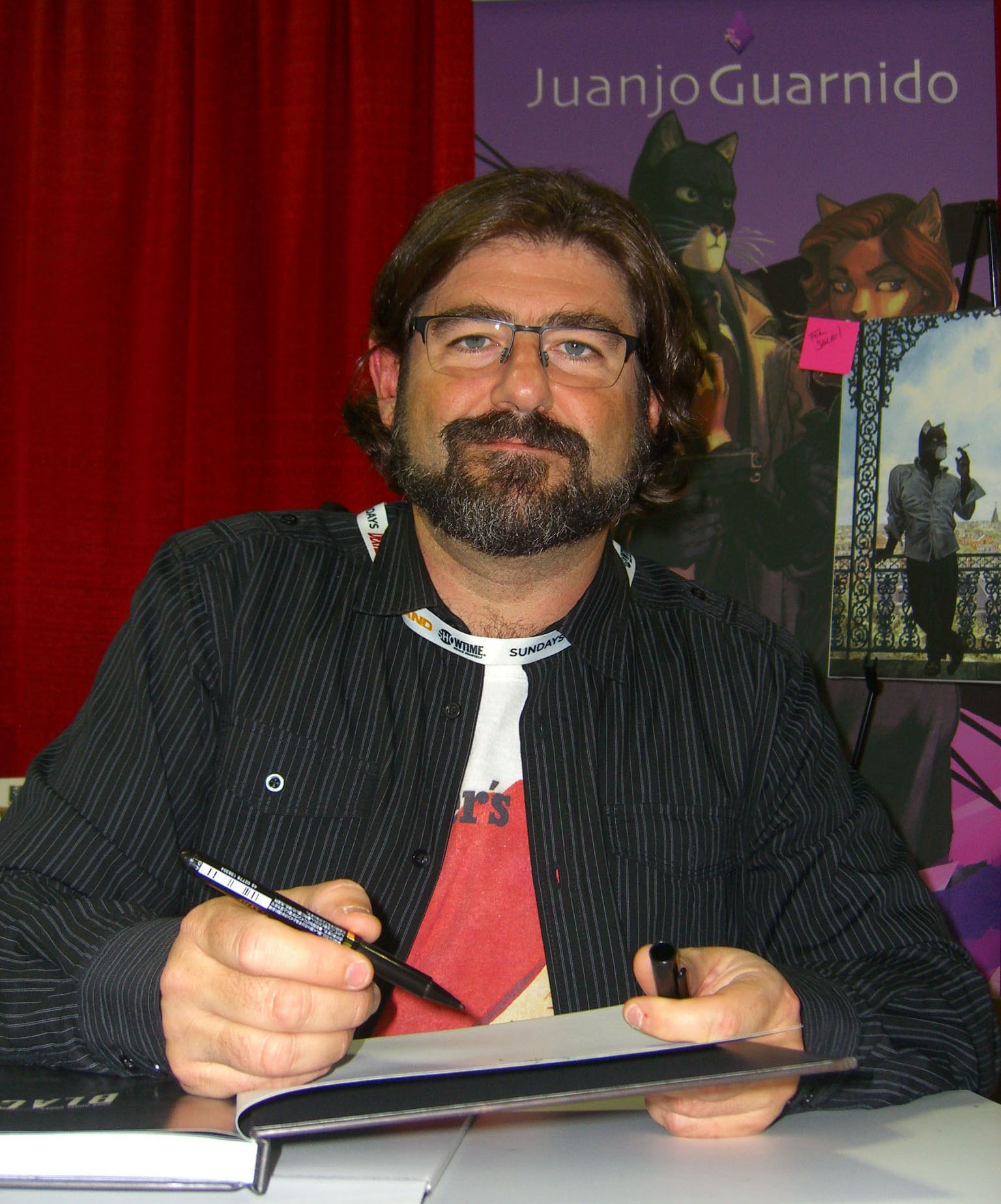
- Guarnido at the 2012 New York Comic Con
- Born: 1967 (age 58–59) Granada, Spain
- Areas: Writer, artist
- Notable works: Blacksad
- Awards: Full list

Juanjo Guarnido (born 1967) is a Spanish illustrator and the co-author of the comic book series Blacksad.

== Early life ==
Guarnido was born in Granada, Spain. He studied painting at the Faculty of Fine Arts of the University of Granada.

== Career ==
Guarnido collaborated on several fanzines and produced work for Marvel Comics. Unfortunately, the small size of the Spanish market forced him to turn to other means of earning a living. In 1990, he left Granada and moved to Madrid, where he worked on a TV series for three years. There he met Juan Díaz Canales, with whom he discussed producing comics. In 1993, Guarnido applied for a job with the Walt Disney Studios in Montreuil, France and consequently moved to Paris. He was the lead animator for the character Sabor in the Disney film Tarzan, as well as the lead animator for Hades in Hercules and Helga in Atlantis: The Lost Empire.

After Guarnido left Disney, he reconnected with Canales. After contacting several editors, Guarnido and Canales finally signed on with French publisher Dargaud, and in November 2000, Quelque part entre les ombres (Somewhere within the Shadows) was published. It was a success among critics and the public, and won the Prix de la Découverte at the Sierre International Comics Festival and the "Avenir" Prize at the Lys-lez-Lannoy Festival, respectively in Switzerland and France. In March 2003, the second album Arctic-Nation was released. It was once again a success, winning the Prize Awarded by the Audience and the Prize for Artwork at the 2004 Angoulême International Comics Festival. The third instalment of the Blacksad series, Âme Rouge (Red Soul), was published in 2005. In 2006 it was awarded the Angoulême Prize for a Series.

In 2009 Guarnido teamed up with writer Alain Ayroles, who is known for two hugely successful BD series in France - Garulfo and De cap et de Crocs, to begin work on a 'one shot' project that resulted in the release of Les Indes fourbes (The treacherous Indies) by publishing house Delcourt some ten years later, in 2019. Billed as the second part of El Buscón (The Swindler) by Francisco de Quevedo, it is narrated by lovable rogue Don Pablos whose aim in life is to become a gentleman. Les Indes Fourbes starts with Don Pablos’ journey to the New World and the comedy of events that unfold.

== Awards ==
- 2000: Prize for Best First Album at the Lys-lez-Lannoy festival
- 2000: Prix spécial at the Rœulx (Belgium) festival
- 2000: Prix Némo at the Maisons-Laffitte festival
- 2000: Prix découverte at Sierre International Comics Festival
- 2001: Best Artwork Award at Festival de Chambéry
- 2002: Best Artwork Award at Grand Prix Albert Uderzo
- 2003: Prix spécial du jury au Sierre International Comics Festival
- 2004: Angoulême Audience Award, for Arctic-Nation
- 2004: Angoulême Best Artwork Award, for Arctic-Nation
- 2004: Virgin Prize for Best Album, for Arctic-Nation
- 2006: Angoulême Best Series Award, for the Blacksad series
- 2006: Bédéis Causa - Prix Maurice Petitdier for the best foreign comic at the Festival de la BD francophone de Québec for Blacksad
- 2008: Iluminart Artward, for the Blacksad series
- 2011: Eisner Award, Best Painter/Multimedia Artist (Interior Art), for the Blacksad series
- 2019: The Landerneau Prize (France) awarded by Régis Loisel for Les Indes fourbes.
- 2019: The RTL Grand Prix for comics (France) for Les Indes fourbes.
- 2019: Comic booksellers (France) prize for Les Indes fourbes.
- 2024: Inkpot Award

== Bibliography ==
- Blacksad series (Dargaud) with Juan Díaz Canales
  - Somewhere Within the Shadows (2000)
  - Arctic Nation (2003)
  - Red Soul (2005)
  - A Silent Hell (2010)
  - Amarillo (2013)
  - They All Fall Down - Part 1 (2021)
  - They All Fall Down - Part 2 (2023)
- Les Indes fourbes with Alain Ayroles
  - Les Indes Fourbes [The Treacherous Indies], 2019 (in French). Delcourt - ISBN 978-2-7560-3573-4 - Official Selection Angoulême Festival 2020
  - Les Indes Fourbes [The Treacherous Indies]: Deluxe Edition, 2019 (in French). Co-edition Caurette/Black & White - ISBN 979-10-96315-50-5 - Limited edition of 499 numbered and signed copies

== Animation ==
- Freak of the Week (director) (2014)
