= Amour & Intérim (Lapinot) =

- Date: 1998
- Series: Les formidables aventures de Lapinot
- Publisher: Dargaud

Creative team
- Writers: Lewis Trondheim
- Artists: Lewis Trondheim

Original publication
- Language: French

Translation

Chronology
- Preceded by: Walter, 1996
- Followed by: Vacances de printemps, 1999

Amour & Intérim (unofficial English translation: Love & Interim) is a comic strip in the series The spiffy adventures of McConey (Les formidables aventures de Lapinot in the original French language), by the French cartoonist Lewis Trondheim. It was first released in 1998 as volume 4 in the series.

This adventure takes place in modern France and uses the normal continuing storyline of the series. The plot deals with theological and moral issues, as well as containing plenty of humour.

== Plot ==
The Damoclès company, a mysterious organisation whose goals and methods are not entirely clear, suddenly offers a job as managing director to Lapinot, even though he doesn't know anything about the company. After originally declining the job, he hesitates and finally accepts, partly because he thinks a job in the same town as Nadia, a woman he met during winter holidays in Slaloms, will help him start a relationship with her.
