= Delcourt =

Delcourt may refer to:

== People ==
- Alfred Delcourt (1929–2012), Belgian football referee
- Frédéric Delcourt (born 1964), French backstroke swimmer and Olympic medalist
- Guillaume Delcourt (1825–1898), Belgian navy officer, navigator, naval engineer, and maritime advisor to King Leopold II.
- Guy Delcourt (politician) (born 1947), French politician
- Guy Delcourt (editor) (born 1958), French comics editor and publisher, founder of the Delcourt publishing house
- Jacques Delcourt (1928–2011), French sports administrator
- Marie Delcourt (1891–1979), Belgian philologist

== Other uses ==
- Delcourt (publisher), French publishing house specializing in comics and manga

== See also ==
- Delcourt's gecko, an extinct species
