= Alain Ayroles =

French comics author

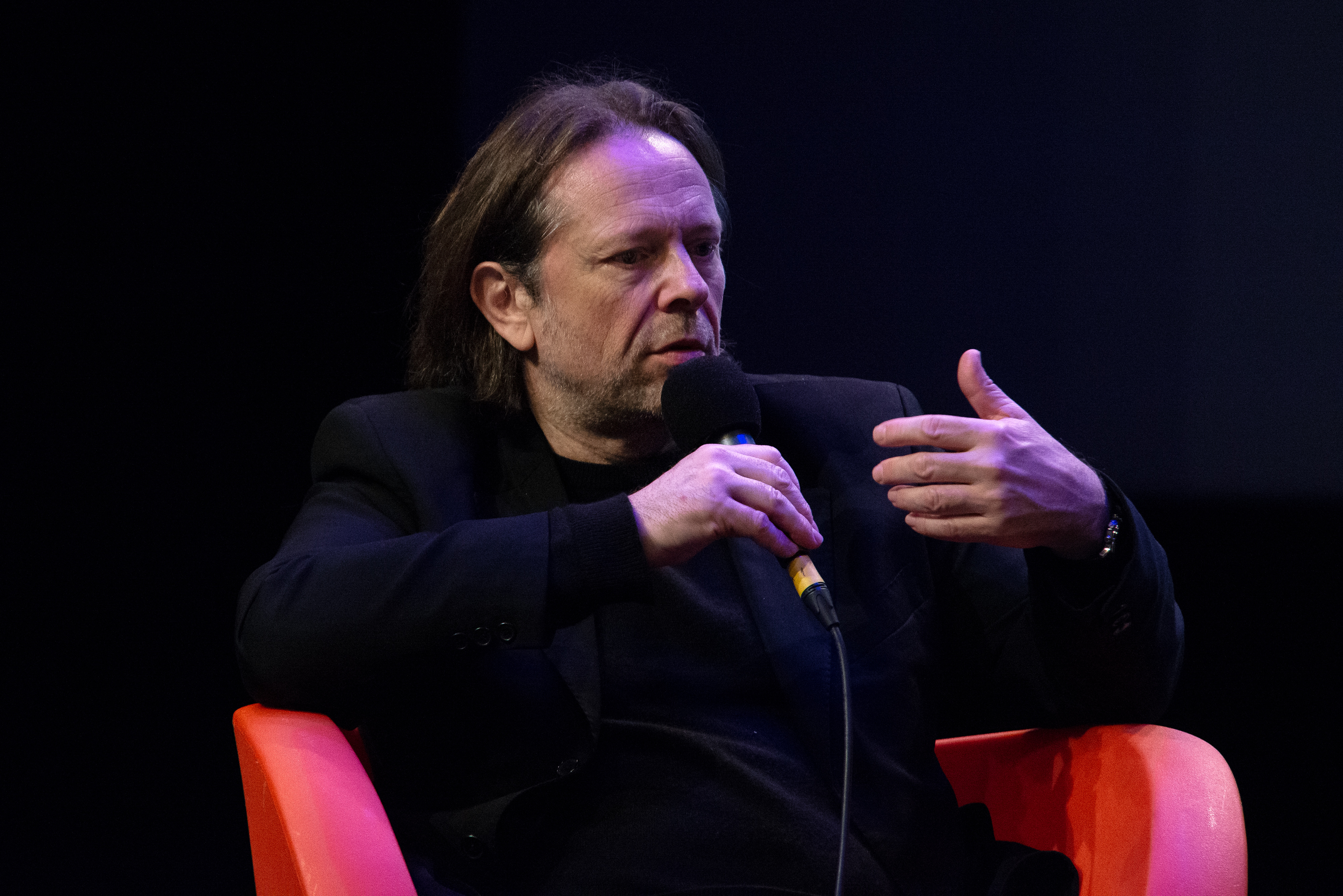
- Alain Ayroles
- Born: 25 January 1968 (age 58) Saint-Céré, France
- Areas: Cartoonist, Writer, Artist
- Notable works: Garulfo; De cape et de crocs; Les Indes fourbes
- Collaborators: Bruno Maïorana, Jean-Luc Masbou, Juanjo Guarnido

Alain Ayroles (born 25 January 1968) is a French author, playwright, screenwriter and translator known best for his graphic novels Garulfo, De cape et de crocs and Les Indes fourbes.

== Career ==
=== Education and early career ===
Alain Ayroles studied sequential art at the School of Fine Arts in Angoulême, France, where time spent as role-playing game gamemaster to fellow students Jean-Luc Masbou and Bruno Maïorana laid the foundations for future collaborations on a series of highly successful graphic novel projects. For these games he created Contes et Racontars, a fantasy universe that combined swashbuckling adventure with traditional legends, in which one of the players plays a wolf and another a fox, and where the gamemaster plays a non-player character in the guise of a rabbit. This universe would become the inspiration for two series: fairy tale Garulfo and the epic De cape et de crocs.

Ayroles got his break when a small publishing house, recently created by the young Guy Delcourt, hired Ayroles and several of his classmates to work on The Children of the Nile. This publication helped launch the professional careers of authors such as Turf, Joel Mouclier, Claire Wendling and Christophe Gibelin, and Jean-Luc Masbou. Following this Ayroles began writing the scripts to his future graphic novels and spent much of his time researching French literature and poetry as well as 13th century vocabulary. In the meantime, he took a position at French animation studio IDDH to work on layouts, character creation and the scripts to their animated series'. Maoïrana, Masbou and Thierry Leprévost also worked at IDDH for a time.

=== Early successes ===
With Garulfo Ayroles wanted to turn the idea of the classic fairy tale on its head. With the script to the first two instalments and some draft drawings, he pitched the idea to a number of publishing houses. However, editors advised him to find someone to collaborate with as the boards did not meet with approval. So Ayroles approached Maïorana and together they pitched it to Delcourt who agreed to publish the story. Volume 1 was released in 1995. The series proved a commercial and critical success until it ended after six albums in 2002.

In parallel to Garulfo, Ayroles and Masbou pitched a second series to Delcourt, which would prove even more successful. De cape et de crocs is a 17th-century theatrical comedy of fable and adventure full of references to French classical literature. Volume 1 was released in 1995, and success led to another 11 volumes being published over the next 21 years. Critical reception was positive, described by Actua BD as "becoming more and more of a classic". a series which mixes "comic, novel, theatre and cinema" that is "rich in a thousand and one references, expertly distilled by authors who are as cultivated as they are mischievous". The series ended in 2016.

In 1998 Ayroles was awarded the Petit Robert prize for best comics writer at Quai des Bulles for Garulfo and De cape et de crocs.

=== An established writer ===
Skill with words proves useful in translating the Bone series of comic books by Jeff Smith, whom Ayroles had been a fan of since the early 90s, and had brought to the attention of Delcourt. He worked on the first five volumes of the French version in collaboration with Anne Capuron.

In 2008, his collaboration with Luigi Critone Seven Missionaries drew positive reviews, according to Actua BD the album is "particularly well-crafted from a scripted point of view" and littered with "provocative humour". Seven Missionaries recounts the adventures of seven not-so-Catholic priests who have to counter the Viking invasions in Ireland. Ayroles proved to be one of the few authors working on the Sept series to develop seven characters and a complete story in a single volume.

From 2009, he published a new series with Maïorana and Thierry Leprévost, D, which was inspired by the gothic world of vampires in a plot set in Victorian Britain.

Teaming up with Juanjo Guarnido, he wrote Les Indes fourbes (The treacherous Indies), published in 2019, about the adventures of Pablos de Segovia, a character from the novel by Francisco de Quevedo El Buscon. The album immediately met with great critical and public success, collecting three awards in France.

In 2020 he worked with Fabien Nury, Benjamin Adam and Thibault Valetoux on the screenplay to Paris Police 1900, a period drama series for French television, featuring eight episodes of 52 minutes, broadcast on Canal+.

In 2021 he collaborated on a spin-off of Alex Alice's Castle of the stars series. The Chimeras of Venus is a five-chapter story drawn and colored by Étienne Jung. This steampunk-oriented space epic is developed in the same universe as the source series, between volumes 13 and 17, which Ayroles is also credited for.

=== Awards ===
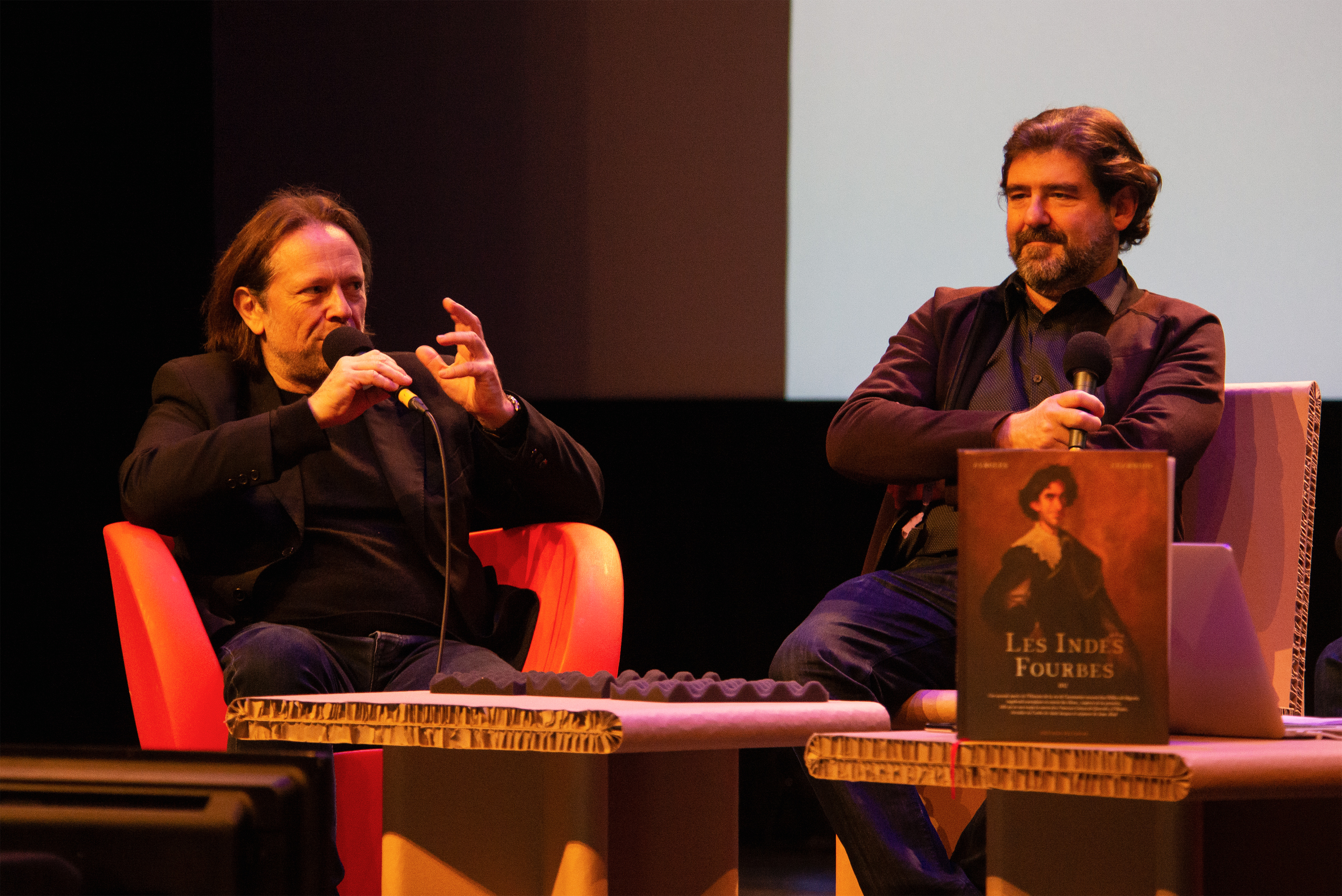
Alain Ayroles and Juanjo Guarnido at the Angoulême International Comics Festival 2020.

- 1998: The Petit Robert prize for best comics writer, awarded at Quai des Bulles for Garulfo and De cape et de crocs.
- 2019: The Landerneau Prize (France) awarded by Régis Loisel for Les Indes fourbes.
- 2019: The RTL Grand Prix for comics (France) for Les Indes fourbes.
- 2019: Comic booksellers (France) prize for Les Indes fourbes

== Bibliography ==
=== Garulfo ===
Illustrated by Bruno Maïorana, colors by Thierry Leprévost.

- 1 Ayroles, Alain (1995). De mares en châteaux [From ponds to castles] (in French). Paris: Delcourt. ISBN 2-84055-045-8.
- 2 Ayroles, Alain (1996). De mal en pis [From bad to worse] (in French). Paris: Delcourt. ISBN 2-84055-087-3.
- 3 Ayroles, Alain (1997). Le prince aux deux visages [The Prince with Two Faces] (in French). Paris: Delcourt. ISBN 978-2-84055-139-3.
- 4 Ayroles, Alain (1998). L'ogre aux yeux de cristal [The Ogre with Crystal Eyes] (in French). Paris: Delcourt. ISBN 978-2-84055-237-6.
- 5 Ayroles, Alain (2000). Preux et prouesse [Knights and Prowess] (in French). Paris: Delcourt. ISBN 2-84055-334-1.
- 6 Ayroles, Alain (2002). La belle et les bêtes [Beauty and the Beasts] (in French). Paris: Delcourt. ISBN 978-2-84055-579-7.

=== De Cape et de crocs ===
Illustrated by Jean-Luc Masbou

- 1 Ayroles, Alain (1995). Le Secret du janissaire [The Secret of the Janissary] (in French). Paris: Delcourt. ISBN 2-84055-059-8.
- 2 Ayroles, Alain (1997). Pavillon noir ! [Jolly Roger!] (in French). Paris: Delcourt. ISBN 2-84055-143-8.
- 3 Ayroles, Alain (1998). L'Archipel du danger [The Archipelago of Danger] (in French). Paris: Delcourt. ISBN 2-84055-335-X.
- 4 Ayroles, Alain (2000). Le Mystère de l'île étrange [Mystery of the Strange Isle] (in French). Paris: Delcourt. ISBN 2-84055-059-8. includes one Act play Le Médecin imaginaire (The imaginary Doctor)
- 5 Ayroles, Alain (2002). Jean Sans Lune [John Moonless] (in French). Paris: Delcourt. ISBN 2-84055-578-6.
- 6 Ayroles, Alain (2004). Luna incognita [Luna incognita] (in French). Paris: Delcourt. ISBN 978-2-84789-112-6.
- 7 Ayroles, Alain (2006). Chasseurs de chimères [Chimera Hunters] (in French). Paris: Delcourt. ISBN 2-84789-925-1.
- 8 Ayroles, Alain (2007). Le maître d'armes [The Master at Arms] (in French). Paris: Delcourt. ISBN 978-2-7560-0318-4.
- 9 Ayroles, Alain (2009). Revers de fortune [Reversal of Fortune] (in French). Paris: Delcourt. ISBN 978-2-7560-0835-6.
- 10 Ayroles, Alain (2012). De la Lune à la Terre [From the Moon to the Earth] (in French). Paris: Delcourt. ISBN 978-2-7560-1996-3.
- 11 Ayroles, Alain (2014). Vingt mois avant [Twenty Months Past] (in French). Paris: Delcourt. ISBN 978-2-7560-4036-3.
- 12 Ayroles, Alain (2016). Si ce n'est toi... [If it wasn't you...] (in French). Paris: Delcourt. ISBN 978-2-7560-6475-8.

=== Sept ===
Illustrated by Luigi Critone, colors by Lorenzo Pieri

- Vol. 4: Ayroles, Alain (2008). Sept missionnaires [Seven missionaries] (in French). Paris: Delcourt. ISBN 978-2-7560-0643-7.

=== D ===
Illustrated by Bruno Maïorana, colors by Thierry Leprévost

- 1 Ayroles, Alain (2009). Lord Faureston [Lord Faureston] (in French). Paris: Delcourt. ISBN 978-2-7560-0412-9.
- 2 Ayroles, Alain (2011). Lady d'Angerès [Lady d'Angere] (in French). Paris: Delcourt. ISBN 978-2-7560-1960-4.
- 3 Ayroles, Alain (2014). Monsieur Caulard [Mr Caulard] (in French). Paris: Delcourt. ISBN 978-2-7560-1960-4.

=== Les Indes Fourbes ===
Illustrated by Juanjo Guarnido

- Ayroles, Alain (2019). Les Indes fourbes [The Treacherous Indies] (in French). Paris: Delcourt. ISBN 978-2-7560-3573-4. - Official Selection Angoulême Festival 2020
- Ayroles, Alain (2019). Les Indes Fourbes : Tirage de luxe [The Treacherous Indies: Deluxe Edition] (in French). Co-edition Caurette/Black & White - ISBN 979-10-96315-50-5 - Limited edition of 499 numbered and signed copies.

=== Château des Etoiles ===
Illustrated by Etienne Jung

- Ayroles, Alain (2021). Les Chimères de Vénus [Chimaeras of Venus] (in French). Paris: Rue de Sèvres. ISBN 978-2-369-81187-9.
- Ayroles, Alain (2023). Les Chimères de Vénus 2 [Chimaeras of Venus 2] (in French). Paris: Rue de Sèvres. ISBN 978-2-369-81030-8.
- Ayroles, Alain (2026). Les Chimères de Vénus 3 [Chimaeras of Venus 3] (in French). Paris: Rue de Sèvres. ISBN 978-2-810-20242-3.

=== L'Ombre des lumières ===
Illustrated by Richard Guérineau.

- Ayroles, Alain (2023). L'Ennemi du genre humain [The enemy of human kind] (in French). Paris: Delcourt. ISBN 9782413078548.
- Ayroles, Alain (2024). Dentelles et Wanpum [Lace and Wanpum] (in French). Paris: Delcourt. ISBN 9782413078555.
- Ayroles, Alain (2025). Le Démon des Grands Lacs [Demon of the Great Lakes] (in French). Paris: Delcourt. ISBN 9782413087816.

== See also ==
- Mythic fiction
- Fantasy comedy
