= Pour de vrai (Lapinot) =

- Date: 1999
- Series: Les formidables aventures de Lapinot
- Publisher: Dargaud

Creative team
- Writers: Lewis Trondheim
- Artists: Lewis Trondheim

Original publication
- Language: French

Translation

Chronology
- Preceded by: Vacances de printemps, 1999
- Followed by: La couleur de l'enfer, 2000

Pour de vrai (unofficial English translation: For real) is a comic strip in the series The spiffy adventures of McConey (Les formidables aventures de Lapinot), by the popular French cartoonist Lewis Trondheim. It was first released in 1999 as volume 6 in the series.

This book is a satire of the media world. It mixes stark realism with other elements deeply rooted in fantasy, and scenes of comic relief.

== Plot ==
This adventure takes place in modern France and uses the normal continuing storyline of the series. Lapinot and Nadia are now a couple and they retire for a few days to the countryside in the house of Nadia's uncle. Nadia, working as a TV journalist, wants to find unique and interesting people to interview, hiring Lapinot as her assistant. As the story goes on and as they keep meeting new people, several mysterious events occur, sometimes related to each other, sometimes unrelated. It also seems the house of Nadia's uncle is haunted.
