= Juan Díaz Canales =

Spanish comics artist and an animated film director

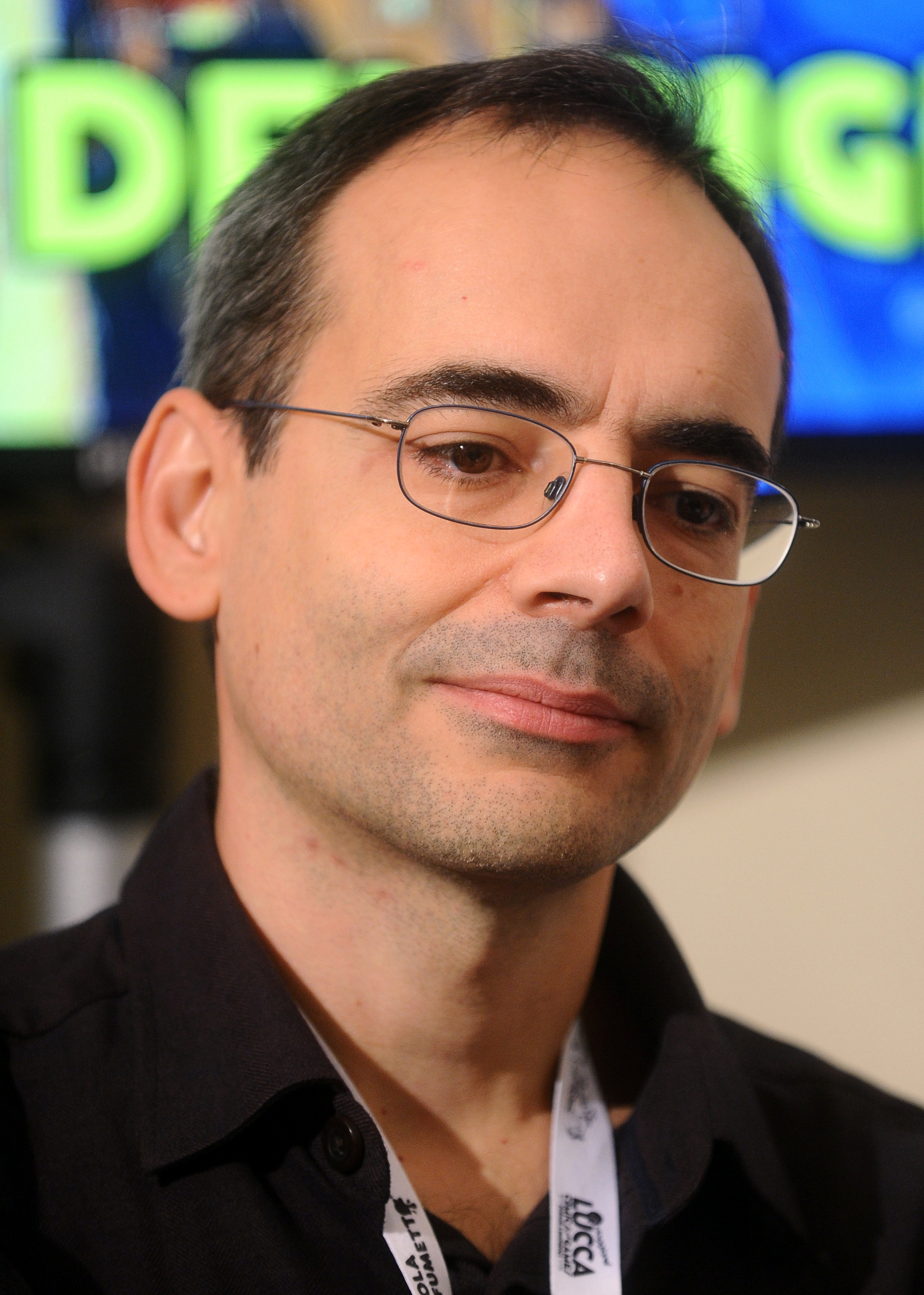
- Juan Diaz Canales at Lucca Comics & Games 2015
- Born: Madrid, Spain
- Area: Writer
- Notable works: Blacksad
- Awards: Full list

Juan Díaz Canales is a Spanish comics artist and an animated film director, known as the co-creator of Blacksad.

== Biography ==
At an early age, Juan Díaz Canales became interested in comics and their creation, which progressed and broadened out to include animated films. At the age of 18, he entered a school for animation. In 1996 he founded, together with three other artists, a company called Tridente Animation. Through this, he has worked with European and American companies, providing plots and scripts for comics and animation films, as well as directing animated television series and animation movies.

During this period he met Juanjo Guarnido, with whom Canales decided to create comics based around a private investigator, Blacksad. After contacting several editors, Guarnido and Canales finally signed on with French publisher Dargaud, and in November 2000, Quelque part entre les ombres (Somewhere within the Shadows) was published. It was a great success with both critics and the public, and was awarded the Prix de la Découverte at the Sierre International Comics Festival and the "Avenir" Prize at the Lys-lez-Lannoy Festival, in Switzerland and France respectively. In March 2003 the second album Arctic-Nation, was released. It was once again a great success, winning the Angoulême Audience Award and the Festival Prize for Artwork in 2004. The third instalment of the Blacksad series, Âme Rouge (Red Soul), was published in 2005. In 2006 it was awarded the Angoulême Prize for a Series.

In 2015, he and artist Rubén Pellejero were chosen by Patrizia Zanotti, in charge of the copyrights to Hugo Pratt's Corto Maltese series, to publish a new album.

== Awards ==
- 2000: Prize for Best First Album at the Lys-lez-Lannoy festival
- 2000: Prix spécial at the Rœulx (Belgium) festival
- 2000: Prix Némo at the Maisons-Laffitte festival
- 2000: Prix découverte at Sierre International Comics Festival
- 2001: Best Artwork Award at Festival de Chambéry
- 2002: Best Artwork Award at Grand Prix Albert Uderzo
- 2003: Prix spécial du jury au Sierre International Comics Festival
- 2004: Angoulême Audience Award, for Arctic-Nation
- 2004: Angoulême Best Artwork Award, for Arctic-Nation
- 2004: Virgin Prize for Best Album, for Arctic-Nation
- 2006: Angoulême Best Series Award, for the Blacksad series
- 2006: Bédéis Causa - Prix Maurice Petitdier for the best foreign comic at the Festival de la BD francophone de Québec for Blacksad

== Bibliography ==
- Blacksad series (Dargaud)
1. Somewhere Within the Shadows (2000)
2. Arctic Nation (2003)
3. Red Soul (2005)
4. A Silent Hell (2010)
5. Amarillo (2013)
6. They All Fall Down - Part 1 (2021)
7. They All Fall Down - Part 2 (2023)
- The Patricians series (Glénat)
  1. The Will to Power (2009)
  2. Wandala: Year Zero (2010)
- Beneath the Midnight Sun (2015, with artist Rubén Pellejero. Part of the Corto Maltese series.)
- Blacksad Stories: Weekly (2025)

== Sources ==
- Canales publications in Pilote BDoubliées (in French)
- Blacksadmania.com (French)
- reyes y poetas (Spanish blog of Juan Díaz Canales)
