= Juan Pérez de Montalbán =

Juan Pérez de Montalbán (1602 – 25 June 1638) was a Spanish Catholic priest, dramatist, poet and novelist.

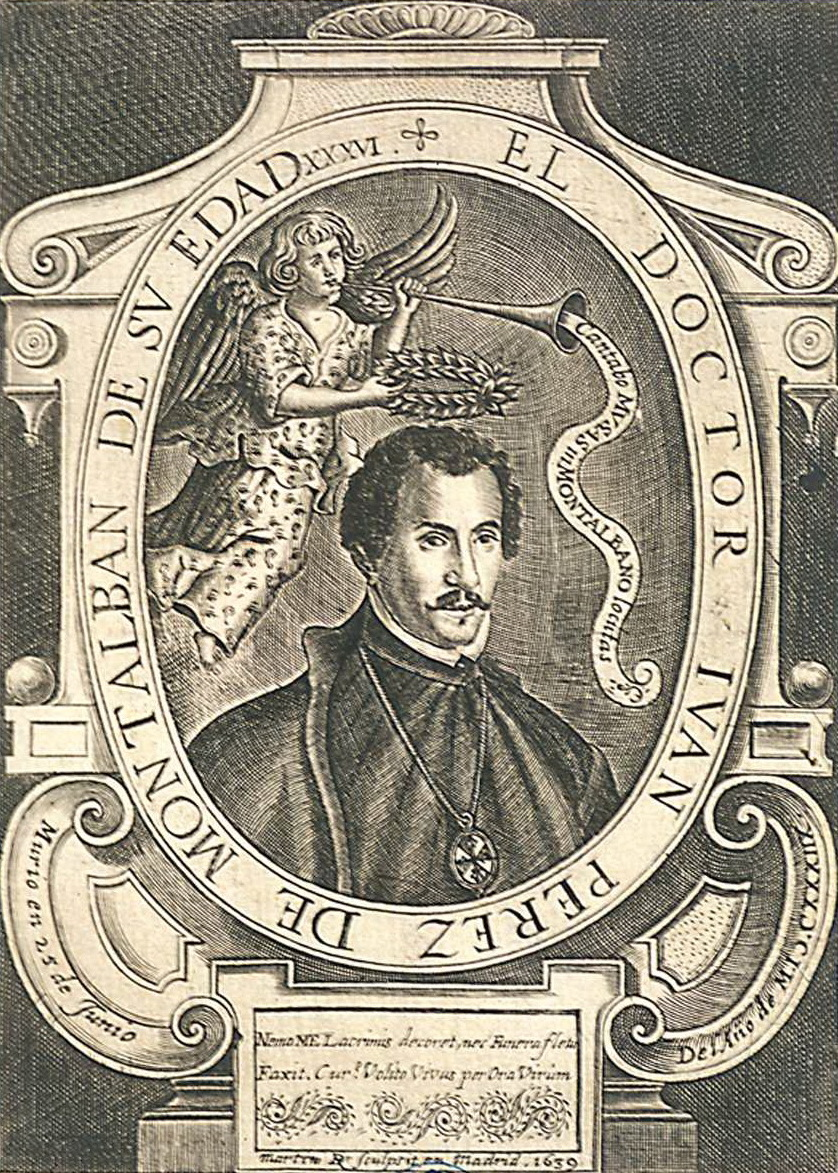
Juan Perez de Montalban, 1639

== Biography ==
He was born in Madrid. At the age of eighteen, he became a licentiate in theology. He was ordained priest in 1625 and appointed notary to the Inquisition. A notable member of the Medrano Academy, in 1619 he began writing for the stage under the guidance of Lope de Vega, who is said to have assisted him in composing El Orfeo en lengua castellana (1624), a poem intended to compete with Jáuregui's Orfeo, published earlier in the same year.

Montalbán's father, a publisher at Madrid, issued a pirated edition of Quevedo's Buscón, which roused an angry controversy. The violence of these polemics, the strain of overwork, and the death of Lope de Vega so affected Montalbán that he became insane; he died in Madrid on 25 June 1638. His last work was a eulogistic biography of Lope de Vega in the Fama póstuma (1636).

== Works ==
His plays, published in 1635–1638, are all in the manner of Lope de Vega. They were staged with much success, but, with the exception of Los Amantes de Teruel, are little more than clever improvizations. Montalbán almost rivaled Lope de Vega in dramatic productiveness, but, according to one critic, he followed that writer's conventional manner, flimsiness in construction, and carelessness in execution too closely.

The prose tales in Sucesos y prodigios de amor, en ocho novelets ejemplares (1624) and Para todos: Exemplos morales, humanos y divinos (1632) were very popular. George Ticknor characterized “The Disastrous Friendship,” a tale in the former collection, as one of the best in the Spanish language. “Aurora and the Prince,” was translated into English by Thomas Stanley (1647).

A libellous attack on Quevedo, entitled El Tribunal de la justa venganza (1635), is often ascribed to Montalbán. Montalbán's reputation was such that sometimes his name appeared on works by other writers.
