= Vacances de printemps (Lapinot) =

- Date: 1999
- Series: Les formidables aventures de Lapinot
- Publisher: Dargaud

Creative team
- Writers: Frank Le Gall
- Artists: Lewis Trondheim

Original publication
- Language: French

Translation

Chronology
- Preceded by: Amour & Intérim, 1998
- Followed by: Pour de vrai, 1999

Vacances de printemps (unofficial English translation: Spring vacation) is a comic strip in the series The spiffy adventures of McConey (Les formidables aventures de Lapinot in the original French language), by the popular French cartoonist Lewis Trondheim. It was first released in 1999 as volume 5 in the series.

Unlike the other entries in the series, which were both drawn and written by Trondheim, this volume is only drawn by him and was written by another popular French cartoonist, Frank Le Gall.

Trondheim stated he accepted Le Gall's proposal to write a story for him as he felt his characters should not be exclusive to himself, and he enjoyed the idea of other authors writing for them.

== Plot ==
This volume is set in a stock historical setting: England in 1870. Although it uses the same main characters (Lapinot, Richard, Titi) and gives them the same type of personality, this story bears no relation to the continuing storyline of the volumes taking place in modern Paris. Lapinot is a naive English gentleman who wonders what love is, and tries to conquer the heart of his childhood love, Miss Nadia. But his rivals Richardon (Richard) and McTerry (Titi) are also competing for her attention.
