= Les Indes fourbes =

2019 comic book by Alain Ayroles and Juanjo Guarnido

- Page count: 160 pages
- Publisher: Delcourt

Creative team
- Writer: Alain Ayroles
- Artist: Juanjo Guarnido

Original publication
- Date of publication: 28 August 2019
- Language: French
- ISBN: 2756035734

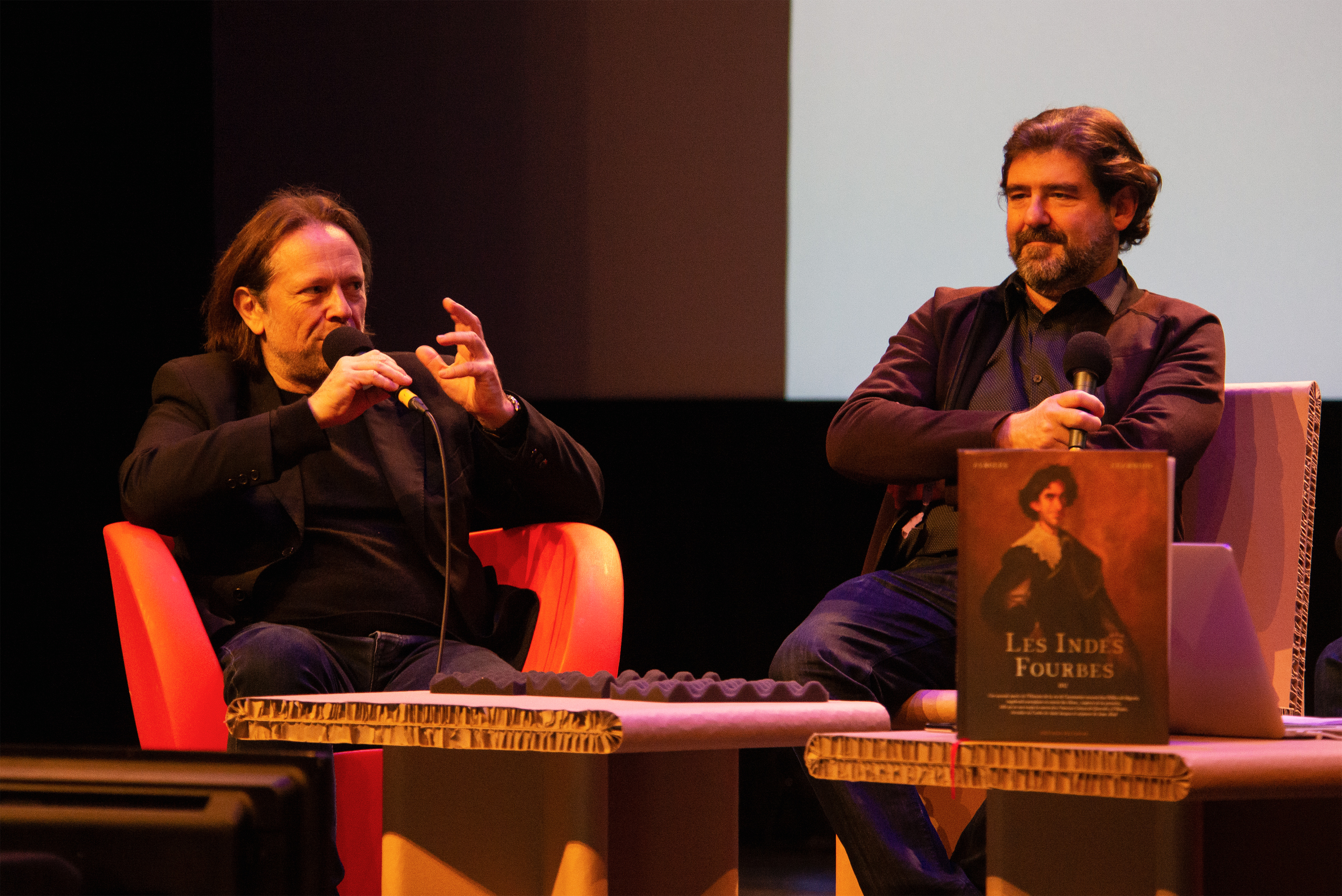
Ayroles and Guarnido with Les Indes fourbes at the 2020 Angoulême International Comics Festival

Les Indes fourbes (lit. 'The Treacherous Indies') is a 2019 comic book written by Alain Ayroles and drawn by Juanjo Guarnido. It is set in the 17th century and follows the Spanish swindler Pablos de Ségovie as he travels to South America, where he searches for El Dorado and experiences a series of adventures with Spanish settlers, freed slaves and natives.

The story was conceived as a sequel to the Spanish picaresque novel The Swindler, written by Francisco de Quevedo and originally published in 1626. Delcourt published Les Indes fourbes on 28 August 2019.

Anne Douhaire-Kerdoncuff of France Inter wrote that there is not a boring second while reading Les Indes fourbes, calling it "one of the best comics of the season".
