= La couleur de l'enfer (Lapinot) =

- Date: 2000
- Series: Les formidables aventures de Lapinot
- Publisher: Dargaud

Creative team
- Writers: Lewis Trondheim
- Artists: Lewis Trondheim

Original publication
- Language: French

Translation

Chronology
- Preceded by: Pour de vrai, 1999
- Followed by: La vie comme elle vient, 2004

La couleur de l'enfer (unofficial English translation: The colour of hell) is a comic strip in the series The spiffy adventures of McConey (Les formidables aventures de Lapinot in the original French language), by the popular French cartoonist Lewis Trondheim. It was first released in 2000 as volume 7 in the series.

== Plot ==
This adventure takes place in modern France and uses the normal continuing storyline of the series. Lapinot and Nadia are still working together (see the previous volume Pour de vrai), this time doing radio interviews. Things don't always go smoothly and work-related arguments lead to tensions in their couple. They most notably meet with a group of radicals with originally noble goals but questionable methods. At the same time, Richard becomes convinced his neighbour is an alien.
