= La vie comme elle vient (Lapinot) =

- Date: 2004
- Series: Les formidables aventures de Lapinot
- Publisher: Dargaud

Creative team
- Writers: Lewis Trondheim
- Artists: Lewis Trondheim

Original publication
- Language: French

Translation

Chronology
- Preceded by: La couleur de l'enfer, 2000
- Followed by: L'accélérateur atomique, 2003

La vie comme elle vient (unofficial English translation: Life as it comes) is a comic strip in the series The spiffy adventures of McConey (Les formidables aventures de Lapinot in the original French language), by the popular French cartoonist Lewis Trondheim. It was first released in 2004 as volume 8 in the series.

Although this book is number 8 in the series, it was released after number 9, L'accélérateur atomique, which was released in 2003, and is thus the final entry in the series.

The tone is practically void of humour and is even grim, creating a major contrast with the other, generally much lighter-spirited volumes. The themes of La vie comme elle vient are death, loss, and how people deal with them. At around the same time the book was published, Trondheim announced his decision to more or less retire and only publish new comic strips on an occasional basis. However, after a break he would eventually continue to produce new books regularly.

== Plot ==
This adventure takes place in modern France and uses the normal continuing storyline of the series. Lapinot meets with all his friends for a party in the apartment he shares with his girlfriend Nadia. There, a tarot card reader predicts someone in the room will die before the next day. Lapinot and Nadia break up and pretty much all the other characters suffer various misfortunes: for example, Richard is beaten up and falls into a coma, and Titi is diagnosed with cancer.

It turns out to be Lapinot, the main character of the series, who dies as the story finishes. After the book's publication, Trondheim explained in his book Désoeuvré that the death of his character didn't exclude the possibility of seeing him again in stock historical settings or in modern-day flashbacks before his death. In August 2017, however, the graphic novel "Un monde un peu meilleur" brings back Lapinot in his established continuity, with the only difference being that he didn't die. The opening pages hint that the reader might be looking at a parallel universe were Lapinot lived.
