= Blacktown (Lapinot) =

- Date: 1995
- Series: Les formidables aventures de Lapinot
- Publisher: Dargaud

Creative team
- Writers: Lewis Trondheim
- Artists: Lewis Trondheim

Original publication
- Language: French

Translation

Chronology
- Preceded by: Slaloms, 1993 and 1997
- Followed by: Pichenettes, 1997

Blacktown is a comic strip in the series The spiffy adventures of McConey (Les formidables aventures de Lapinot in the original French language), by the popular French cartoonist Lewis Trondheim. It was released in 1995 as volume 1 in the series.

Trondheim chose the western genre for this volume, a genre he claimed to hate, as an exercise: he wanted to find out if he could create an exciting adventure out of something he originally didn't care for.

== Plot ==
This is the first volume in the series to be set in a stock historical setting: the Wild West. Although it uses the same main characters (Lapinot, Richard, Titi) and gives them the same type of personality, this story bears no relation to the continuing storyline of the volumes taking place in modern Paris. Lapinot is chased by outlaws for accidentally killing Rex Logan, their leader, and is later on mistaken for an outlaw himself by the villagers of Blacktown, who start chasing him as well. The story is often dark, contains plenty of action and witty dialogue, and moves at a quick pace.
