= L'accélérateur atomique (Lapinot) =

- Date: 2003
- Series: Les formidables aventures de Lapinot
- Publisher: Dargaud

Creative team
- Writers: Lewis Trondheim
- Artists: Lewis Trondheim

Original publication
- Language: French

Translation

Chronology
- Preceded by: La vie comme elle vient, 2004

L'accélérateur atomique (unofficial English translation: The atom accelerator) is an album in the series The spiffy adventures of McConey (Les formidables aventures de Lapinot in the original French language), by the popular French cartoonist Lewis Trondheim. It was first released in 2003 as volume 9 in the series.

Although this album is number 9 in the series, it was released before number 8, La vie comme elle vient, which was released in 2004.

This volume is a light-hearted homage to the Spirou et Fantasio comic strip.

== Plot ==
This volume is set in a stock historical setting, so to speak: the universe of the Spirou et Fantasio comic strip, which was a modern setting but with some added specific flavours. Lapinot plays the part of Spirou, while a newly introduced character plays the part of his friend Fantasio. They are both pursuing a gang of mysterious thieves who own a groundbreaking scientific invention, the atom accelerator. Neither the "Spirou", nor the "Fantasio" character are ever named.
