= Daniel Vierge =

Spanish-born French illustrator (1851–1904)

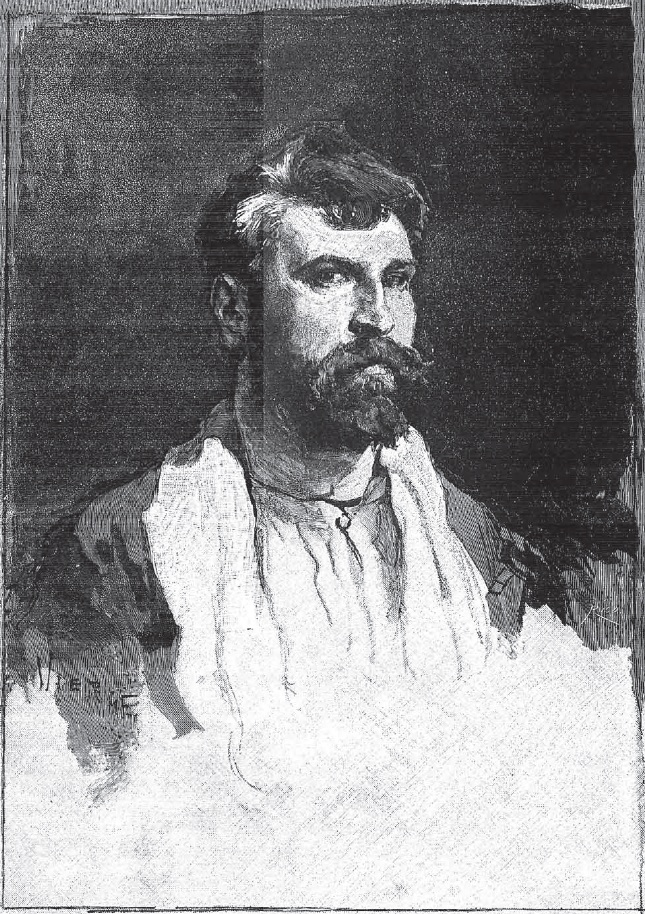
- Self-portrait (date unknown)
- Born: Daniel Urrabieta y Vierge; 5 March 1851; Madrid, Spain
- Died: 10 May 1904 (aged 53); Boulogne-sur-Seine, France

Daniel Urrabieta y Vierge (5 March 1851 – 10 May 1904) was a Spanish-born French illustrator who revolutionized the reproduction of illustrations.

== Biography ==
He was born in Madrid. He went to Paris in 1867 to seek his fortune, where he became attached to Le Monde illustré in 1870, just before the Franco-Prussian War broke out, and, like other artists in the paper, came under the powerful influence of Edmond Morin, the first newspaper draughtsman in France who sought to impart to drawings for journals the character of a work of art. Vierge's early drawings, therefore, partake greatly of Morin's style; including "The Shooting in the Rue de la Paix", "The Place d'Armes at Versailles", "The Loan", "The Great School-Fête of Lyons", "Anniversary of the Fight of Aydes" and "Souvenir of Coulmiers".

Vierge lost no time in proving the extraordinary vigour and picturesqueness of his art. Apart from his contribution of his own original work, he was required by his paper to redraw upon the wood, for the engraver, the sketches sent in by artist-correspondents, such as Luc-Olivier Merson in Rome and Samuel Urrabieta (Vierge's brother) in Spain.

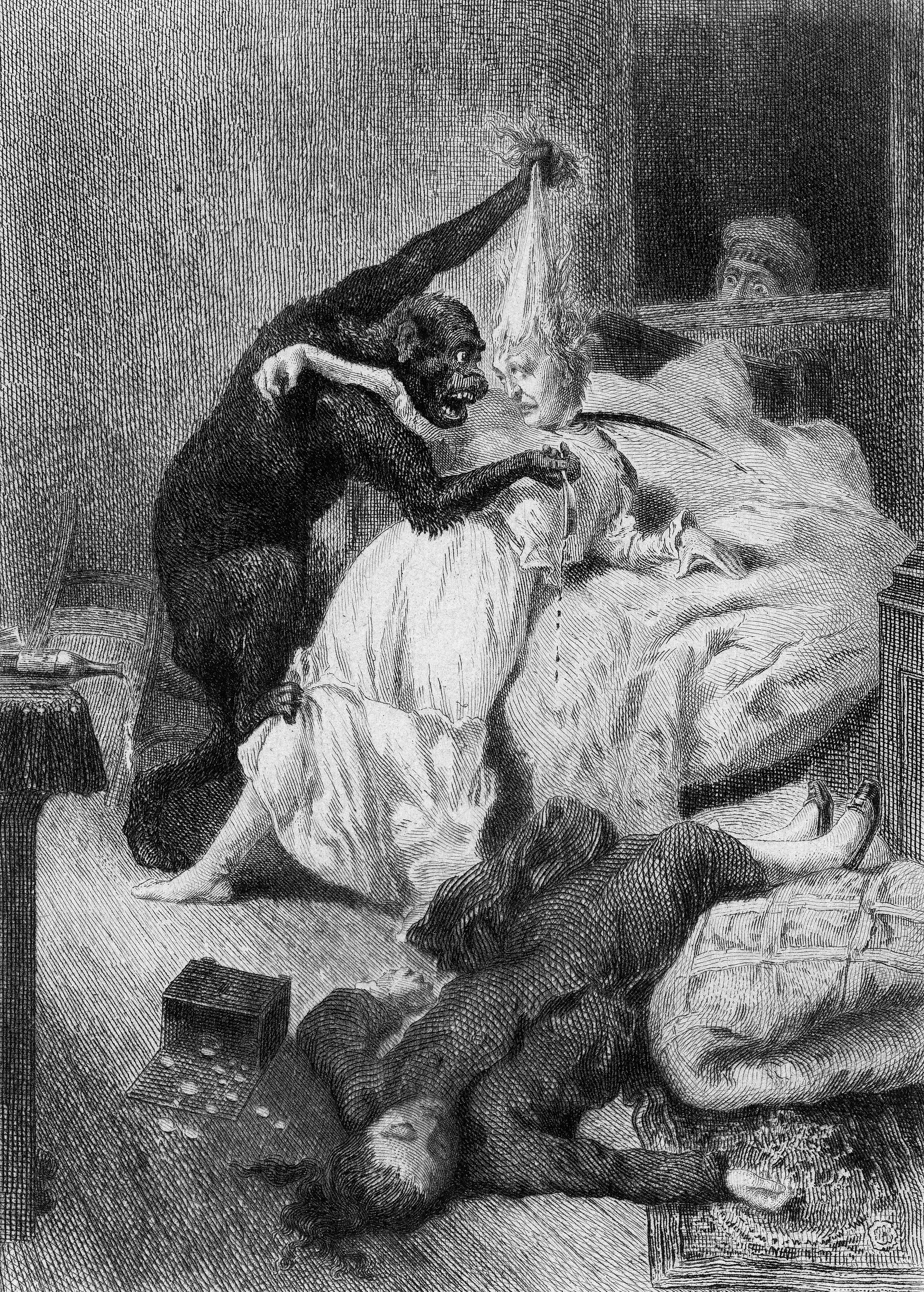
Engraving of Poe's Murders in the Rue Morgue, 1884

From 1871–78 his individuality became more and more pronounced, and he produced, among his best-known drawings, "Christmas in Spain," "The Republican Meeting in Trafalgar Square," "Attack on a Train in Andulusia," "Feast of St Rosalia in Palermo," "In the Jardin d'Acclimatation," "The Burning of the Library of the Escurial, 1872," "Grasshoppers in Algiers," "Brigandage in Sicily," "Night Fête in Constantinople," "Episode of the Civil War in Spain," "Marriage of the King of Spain" and "The Bull Fight." About this time he illustrated with remarkable dash and skill Victor Hugo's Année terrible (Michel Lévy, 1874, and Hugues, 1879), "1813" (Hugues, 1877) and Les Misérables (1882). His masterpiece of illustration is Michelet's History of France (1876), consisting of 26 volumes containing 1,000 drawings. In 1879 he was drawing for La Vie moderne, and then proceeded to illustrate Pablo de Segovia.

In 1882 the publication of his edition of Francisco de Quevedo's Historia de la vida del Buscón llamado don Pablos (The Life Story of a Swindler Called Don Pablos) brought the technique of photo-reproduction to a high level of finish. Prior to that time, most artists and engravers had been forced to rely on tracings and other manual methods which often resulted in interpretations of the artists' works.

In 1891 he illustrated L'Espagnole, by Émile Bergerat, and in 1895 Le Cabaret des trois vertus. In 1898 he held, at the Pelletan Gallery in Paris, an exhibition of his drawings for Chateaubriand's Le Dernier Abencérage ("The Last of the Abencerrages"), and in the following year a comprehensive exhibition of his work (including the illustrations to Don Quixote) at the Art Nouveau Gallery, also in Paris.

In 1898 Vierge contributed to L'Image, a magazine devoted to the encouragement of wood-engraving; and two years later, at the International Exhibition at Paris, he was awarded a grand prix. In 1902 he exhibited at the New Salon a scene from the Franco-Prussian War.

He was never prolific and suffered a stroke at the age of 30, which forced him to learn to draw with his left hand. He died in Boulogne-sur-Seine at the age of 53.
