= El Buscón =

c. 1604 picaresque novel by Francisco de Quevedo

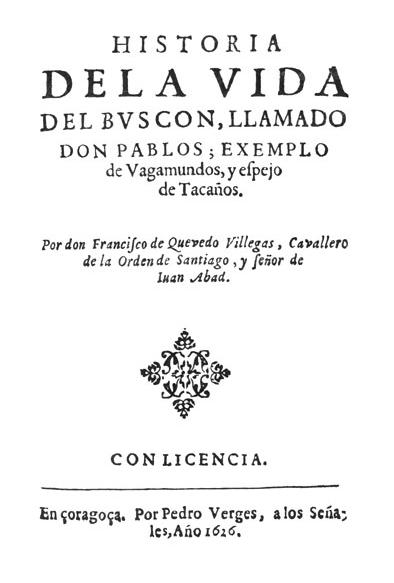
- Original 1626 title page of El Buscón.
- Author: Francisco de Quevedo
- Original title: Historia de la vida del Buscón, llamado Don Pablos, ejemplo de vagamundos y espejo de tacaños
- Language: Spanish
- Genre: Picaresque, Satire
- Publisher: Pedro Verges
- Publication date: 1626
- Publication place: Spain
- Media type: Print (Hardback & Paperback)

El Buscón (full title Historia de la vida del Buscón, llamado Don Pablos, ejemplo de vagamundos y espejo de tacaños (literally: History of the life of the Swindler, called Don Pablos, model for hobos and mirror of the shrewd); translated as Paul the Sharper or The Scavenger and The Swindler) is a picaresque novel by Francisco de Quevedo. It was written around 1604 (the exact date of completion is not known) and published in 1626 by a press in Zaragoza (without Quevedo's permission), though it had circulated in manuscript form previous to that.

== Purpose of the work ==
The only novel written by Quevedo, it is presented in the first person singular and chronicles the adventures of Don Pablos, a buscón or swindler. Pablos sets out in life with two aims: to learn virtue and to become a caballero (gentleman). He fails miserably in both.

El Buscón has been considered a profound satire on Spanish life, but also as a literary exercise for Quevedo, in that he was able to utilize word-play and verbal flourishes and his skill as a literary caricaturist. El Buscón also propounds the notion that children of parents without honor will never be able to achieve honor themselves.

C. Brian Morris has written that Quevedo pursues Pablos with a series of "desgracias...encadenadas" ("linked calamities"). James Iffland describes these "linked calamities" as a "torturously up and down, bouncing trajectory which marks Pablos's career from the outset."

Quevedo satirizes Spanish society, but also attacks Pablos himself, who attempts throughout the novel to achieve a higher station in life and become a gentleman. Such aspirations from the lower classes would only destabilize the social order, in Quevedo's eyes. Quevedo punishes Pablos for attempting to better himself. "For Pablos, human society is the only reality. He knows no other. He is young, innocent, a little foolish." Eventually, Pablos is driven to become a pícaro, or rogue.

The work also incorporates autobiographical elements. In 1608, Quevedo dueled with the writer and fencing master Luis Pacheco de Narváez as a result of Quevedo criticizing one of his works. Quevedo took off Pacheco's hat in the first encounter. They were enemies all their lives. In El Buscón, this duel is parodied with a fencer relying on mathematical calculations having to run away from a duel with an experienced soldier.

Quevedo makes an early references to the effects of syphilis when he puns in his Buscón about a nose entre Roma y Francia meaning both "between Rome and France" and "between dull and eaten by the French illness".

=== Linguistic significance ===
Picaresque works are valuable linguistically because they record the argot of many sectors of society -both the language of the antihero and the criminals the antihero meets on his travels. Quevedo's novel gives a considerable amount of information about Germanía, or Thieves' cant.

== Structure and plot ==
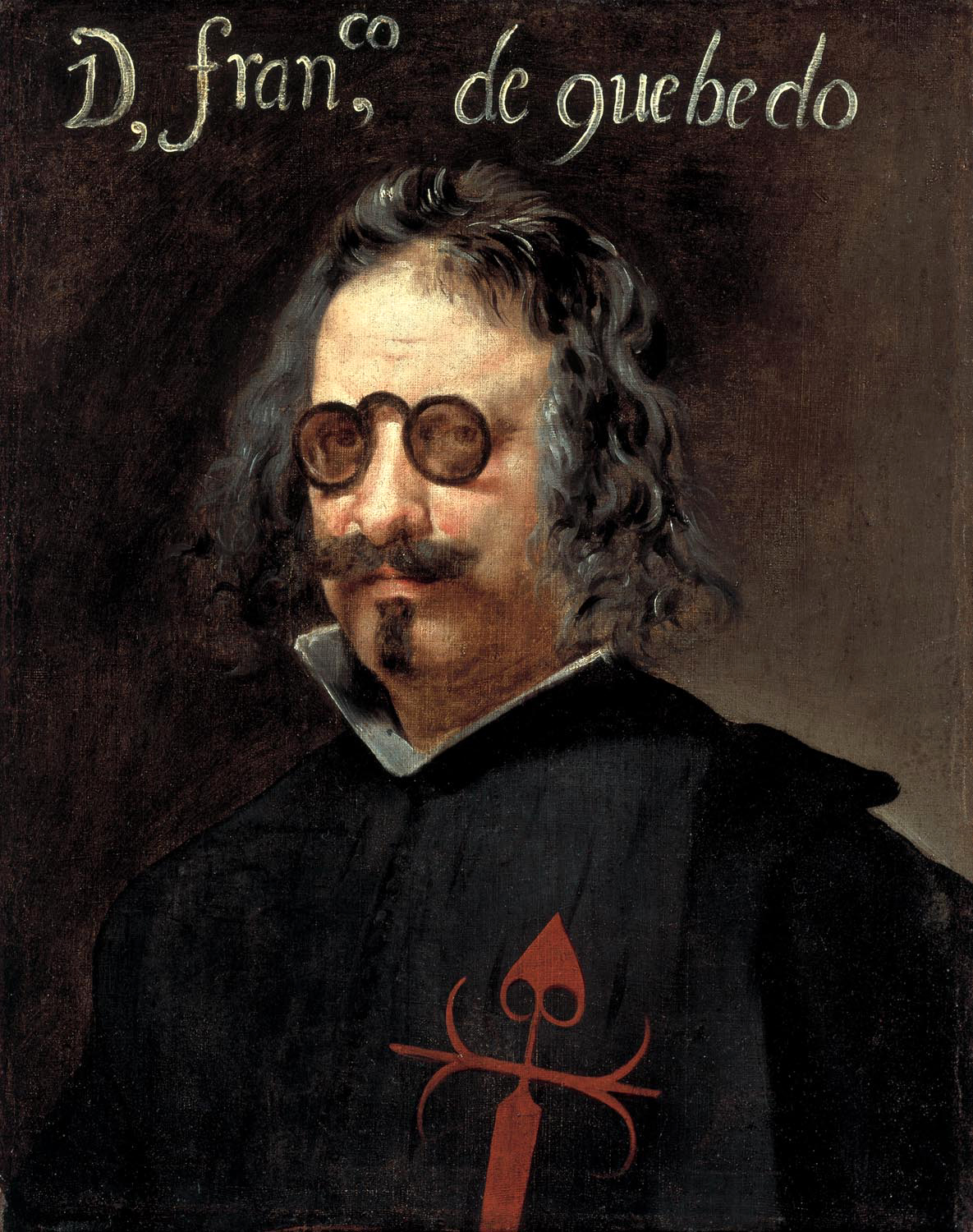
A portrait of Quevedo.

The novel is divided into three books. Book One is divided into seven chapters; Book Two is divided into six chapters; Book Three has ten chapters. One scholar has argued that the structure Quevedo adopts is not one of randomness and Pablos the focus around whom a series of satirical characters and situations group. Instead, "Buscón has a unity and coherence created by something other than the hero's presence, for an orderly train of misfortunes, which connects network of recurring motifs..." These motifs include the closely related themes of family, filth, and legal and lawless cruelty.

=== Book One ===
Pablos is first introduced as a child. His father, Clemente Pablo, is a barber and a thief. His mother, Aldonza, is a prostitute and a witch. There is the implied possibility that she was a New Christian of either Morisco or converso descent; Pablos writes: Sospechábase en el pueblo que no era cristiana vieja ("It was whispered in town that she was not an old Christian [i.e. a "new Christian," a recent convert to Christianity].") Pablos' brother, also a thief, was flogged to death in prison. Pablos wishes to go to school, and his parents agree to let him go. At school, he befriends a boy named Don Diego Coronel, but Pablos suffers various setbacks there. Pablos decides to neither return to school nor home, and remains as the friend and companion of Don Diego, who also decides to leave school.

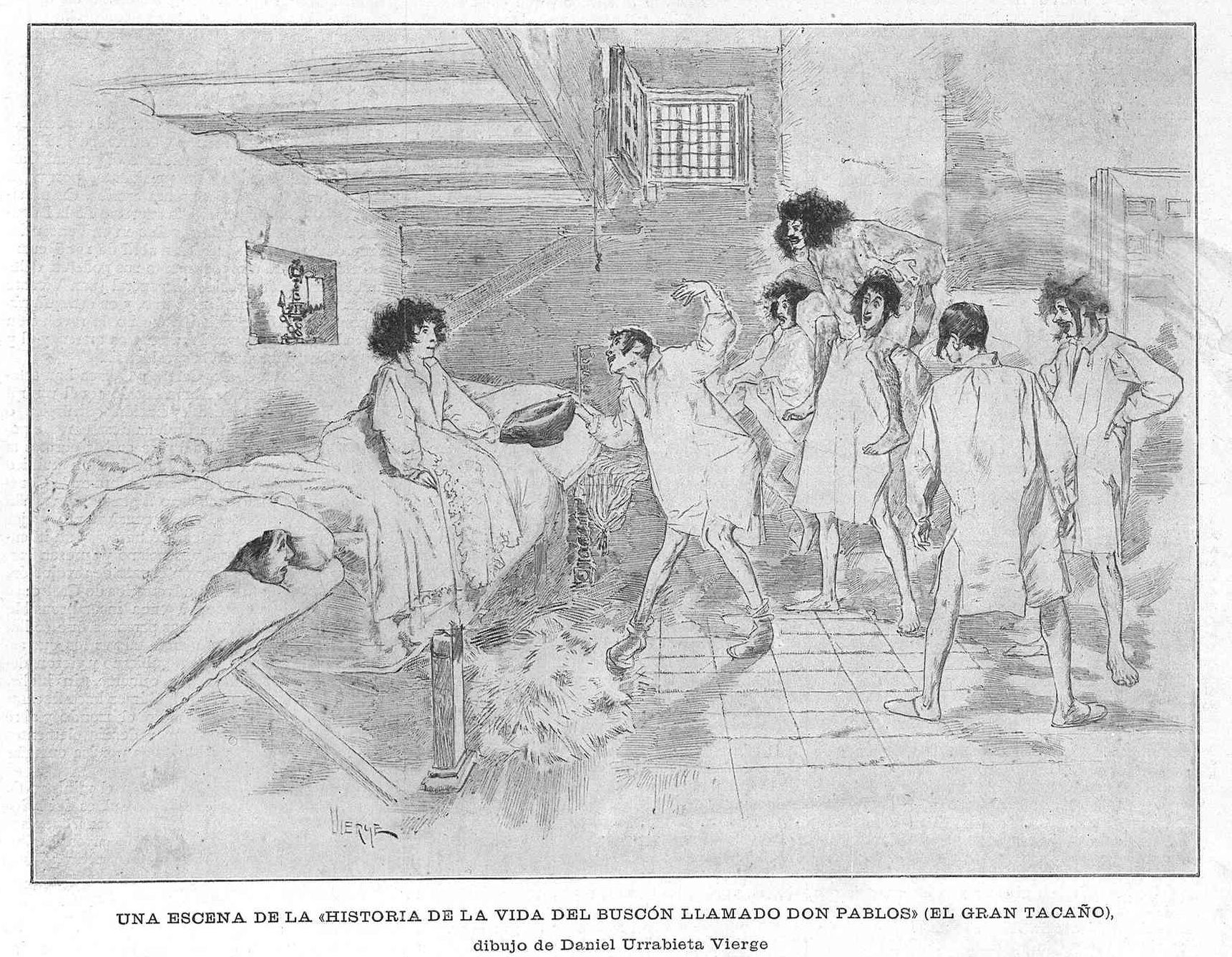
The students ask money from Don Diego. Pablos hides "like a turtle". Book one chapter five. Illustration by Daniel Urrabieta Vierge.

Diego's father, Don Alonso, decides to make both boys wards of a man named Dómine Cabra, in Segovia. The two boys suffer from hunger at the hands of Cabra. When another boy dies of starvation, Alonso removes both boys from the school and sends them off to Alcalá to study. On their way there, they stop at an inn, where Pablos is mocked and hazed by a group of students. At Alcalá, since Pablos is not a gentleman, he is separated from Don Diego, and is hazed and beaten by some university students. During the night, he is beaten again by four students who shared a room with him. Pablos then acts out, killing some pigs that did not belong to him, and puts on a party, tricking his landlady into giving him two chickens. He also robs some sweets from a local merchant and some swords from the rector and a justice of the peace. His friends laugh at his antics.

Pablos then receives a letter that his father has been hanged and his mother imprisoned. For his part, Don Diego receives a letter from his father stating that he does not wish for his son and Pablos to be friends. The friends separate, and Pablos decides to meet with a relative and receive an inheritance due to him as a result of his father's death.

=== Book Two ===
On his way to Segovia to claim his inheritance, Pablos encounters a slightly mad Arbitrista. They converse on various topics, including King Philip III's recent edict expelling the Moriscos from Valencia. Many villages were totally abandoned as a result, and local aristocrats were complaining that the new laborers were fewer in number and were not as familiar with local agricultural techniques. They stay at an inn, and Pablos encounters a teacher there, who attempts to give him a lesson. Pablos and the arbitrista part ways. The next day, Pablos comes across an old cleric, also mad, and they eat dinner at an inn. They also part ways. Pablos continues on his journey, coming across a soldier with terrible wounds, as well as a hermit. They reach Cercedilla. They play cards and the hermit tricks Pablos and the soldiers, thus getting all of the winnings. Pablos parts ways with the three, and meets up with his uncle, Alonso Ramplón, in Segovia. There is a great dinner at his uncle's house, and everyone gets drunk, except for Pablos. While everyone is sleeping off the drink, Pablos goes for a walk. When he returns, he kicks out all of the partygoers except for his uncle, with whom he discusses his inheritance. Pablos takes leave of his uncle, and heads for Madrid, and encounters a man who claims to be a gentleman who has visited the royal court. The alleged hidalgo gives Pablos lessons on how to behave himself at court, how to lie, how to take advantage of certain situations.

=== Book Three ===
Pablos and the alleged gentleman arrive at the house of Don Toribio Rodríguez Vallejo Gómez de Ampuerto y Jordán, who also claims to be a gentleman. At this house, Pablos encounters various cheats and liars, a cofradía de pícaros y rufianes (confraternity of rogues and ruffians). Pablos, still wishing to become a gentleman, is dressed in rags and patched-up clothing. He is subsequently arrested and thrown into prison, along with his new-found friends. Pablos befriends the jailer, who decides not to flog him. The jailer eventually liberates Pablos and dines with him; Pablos claims that he is a relative of the jailer's wife. His friends, however, are flogged and exiled to Seville.

Pablos changes his name to “Ramiro de Guzmán,” and goes to an inn. Pablos decides to pretend to be rich in order to win over the daughter of the innkeeper, Berenguela de Rebolledo. Berenguela falls for his lies and tells Pablos to visit her at night by climbing the rooftop and entering her room in this manner. Unfortunately, the roof collapses. The innkeepers wake up, and, infuriated, beat him and have him thrown into jail.

They whip him in jail, until he is liberated by two men, one from Portugal, the other from Catalonia, who also had their sights set on Berenguela. The two men try to arrange a marriage between Berenguela and Pablos, but Pablos encounters some rich, elderly women. Renaming himself again as “Don Felipe Tristán,” Pablos arrives at the villa where the two women reside. One of these old women, however, has three nieces, all single, and wants Pablos to marry one of them. He falls for Doña Ana, the most beautiful of the three. As they picnic, a gentleman approaches, who is none other than Don Diego. He spots Pablos without being noticed himself. Pablos plays cards with all the ladies, and wins a lot of money. The next day Don Diego confronts him, and has his old friend beaten. He is arrested by a justice of the peace and taken to an inn. Pablos remains there, until he takes to the road again with a new career: that of a beggar. He meets another beggar, Valcázar, who teaches him in this new profession. Pablos earns some money and buys new clothes, a sword, and a hat, and takes off to Toledo, where no one will recognize him. Pablos meets up and joins a group of comedic actors, and Pablos works as a script writer for them. He takes on another new name, “Alonso el Cruel.” He writes some poetry as well. The leader of this band of actors, however, is apprehended by the police. The group is dispersed and Pablos abandons this profession and falls in love with a nun. He goes to mass frequently to see her; the nun ignores him. He travels to Seville, where he joins a group of thieves. The thieves go out to drink and eat together, and become intoxicated. When they return home, they are stopped by the police, who kill one of the thieves. The others disperse and are not caught, but Pablos and the other thieves decide to try their luck in the Indies, to see if their luck will change. Pablos tells us, at the end of the novel, that things in the Americas went even worse for him there.

== Editions of the work ==
The father of Juan Pérez de Montalbán (1602-1638) issued a pirated edition of Buscón, which roused an angry controversy. In 1882 the publication of Daniel Vierge's edition of Buscón brought the technique of photo-reproduction to a high level of finish.

== Adaptations ==
A film version of the novel was made in 1979. It was directed by Luciano Berriatúa and starred Francisco Algora as Pablos. It also starred Ana Belén and Francisco Rabal. The 2019 French comic book Les Indes fourbes by Alain Ayroles and Juanjo Guarnido presents itself as a sequel to the novel, imagining the adventures of Pablos in the New World.
