= Pichenettes (Lapinot) =

The Hoodoodad (Pichenettes)
- Date: 1996
- Series: Les formidables aventures de Lapinot
- Publisher: Dargaud

Creative team
- Writers: Lewis Trondheim
- Artists: Lewis Trondheim

Original publication
- Language: French

Translation
- Date: 1998

Chronology
- Preceded by: Blacktown, 1995
- Followed by: Walter, 1996

Pichenettes is a comic strip in the series The Spiffy Adventures of McConey (Les formidables aventures de Lapinot), by the popular French cartoonist Lewis Trondheim. It was first released in 1996 as volume 2 in the series.

An English translation, titled The Hoodoodad, was also released in 1998.

This volume is often regarded by fans as one of the funniest and strongest entries in the series. It contains several of Richard's most popular quotes.

== Plot ==
The adventure takes place in modern France. While walking on the street, Lapinot and Richard accidentally bumped into a bum who is about to commit suicide. They are able to prevent him from doing so. The man told them that despite his repeated attempts, he was always unsuccessful to end his life. He eventually agrees to stop trying to kill himself as long as they agree to take his little stone which, according to him, is cursed and brings terrible luck to its bearer. Lapinot accepted the stone, and most people around him started to be plagued with bad luck without him noticing, because he did not take the warning seriously. Up until the end of the book, it is not clear whether the curse is real or just a product of the characters’ imagination.
