= The Spiffy Adventures of McConey =

Comic book series

The Spiffy Adventures of McConey (Les formidables aventures de Lapinot in the original French language) is a Franco-Belgian comic series by the popular French cartoonist Lewis Trondheim. It debuted in 1992.

The series mixes satire and fantasy. The main characters are all animals: for instance McConey (Lapinot) is a shy and easygoing rabbit, while Richard is an engaging cat with a loud mouth and a knack for getting into trouble.

The stories alternate between modern France and stock historical settings. The recurring characters in the series can be thought of as actors who don't always play the same people, but always play the same type of roles. The series is generally unpredictable: each book is different in terms of pace, plot, theme, etc.

Out of the ten official volumes of the series, only two have been translated in English.

== Books in the official series ==
- 0. Slaloms (1997, originally released in a smaller black-and-white format in 1993)
- 1. Blacktown (1995)
- 2. Pichenettes (1996) (English translation released in 1998 as The Hoodoodad)
- 3. Walter (1996) (English translation released in 1998 as Harum Scarum)
- 4. Amour & Intérim (1998)
- 5. Vacances de printemps (1999)
- 6. Pour de vrai (1999)
- 7. La couleur de l'enfer (2000)
- 8. La vie comme elle vient (2004)
- 9. L'accélérateur atomique (2003)

Beginning in 2018, Dargaud began releasing English translations with the title The Marvelous Adventures of McConey under the Europe Comics label. As of April 2018, the following issues have been released:

- 0. Slalom (not Slaloms)
- 1. Gloomtown (not Blacktown)
- 2. The Hoodoodad
