= De cape et de crocs =

French series of comic books

De cape et de Crocs
- Cover of the "First Act"
- Date: 1995 - 2012
- No. of issues: 10
- Main characters: Armand Raynal de Maupertuis; Don Lope de Villalobos y Sangrin
- Publisher: Delcourt

Creative team
- Writers: Alain Ayroles
- Artists: Jean-Luc Masbou

Original publication
- Language: French
- ISBN: 2840550598

De cape et de crocs is a French comic book swashbuckling series, created by writer Alain Ayroles and artist Jean-Luc Masbou. It is notable for its many references to classical culture and occasional nods to modern references.

== Synopsis ==
In the 17th-century Venice in an alternative world where humans and some animals live together and even can be coupled, Don Lope de Villalobos y Sangrin, a Spanish wolf, and Armand Raynal de Maupertuis, a French fox, are hired by old and rich Cénile Spilorcio to retrieve a treasure map from a Turkish ship. As they deliver the map, Spilorcio plots to have them arrested and sent to galleys; during the arrest, Maupertuis spots Spilorcio's adoptive daughter, Séléné, and the two fall in love. Spilorcio then sends his son Andreo and his servant Plaisant to find the treasure.

On the galley, Maupertuis and Don Lope meet with white rabbit Eusèbe. On her way, the galley sails into the Turkish ship, the same one from where they stole the map, and boards her; in the battle, Maupertuis and Don Lope are set free and help the Turks gain the upper hand, setting the slaves free and taking Captain Mendoza, the villainous captain of the galley, prisoner. Don Lope and Raïs Kader, captain of the Turkish ship, have an argument and promise each other to arrange for a duel when time is convenient. The party sails to Malta, where Don Lope meets Hermine, a gipsy girl and Andreo's love interest, with whom he falls in love. Mendoza gets free and makes a deal with Spilorcio.

Finding a ship, the party set sails to Atlantis to retrieve the treasure with Andreo and his servant. In the process, they run afoul a pirate ship and are taken prisoners. Maupertuis and Don Lope are fed to a giant sea monster, inside of which they find the Flying Dutchman. Gaining control of the monster, they manage to reach an island of the archipelago where the treasure is supposedly hidden, where they meet with eccentric scientist Bombastus Johannes Theophrastus Almagestus Wernher von Ulm.

Exploring the island, Maupertuis and Don Lope discover that it is inhabited by castaway Selenites, people from the Moon. They are led by Prince Jean sans Lune, exiled brother of the King of the Moon, who plots to seize power; the treasure map was a trick of his to lure Earthmen into bringing him a moonstone, necessary to return to the Moon. Séléné's necklace, which Maupertuis wears as a token, turns out to be such a moonstone, and it is used to propel the Prince's galley into space as the full moon, casting its rays, attracts all Moon matter. The pirate ship, arrived meanwhile and laden with lunar fruits gathered on the island, is also sucked into space.

Maupertuis and Don Lope's party set in pursuit in Bombastus's custom-made spaceship. Bombastus, however, falls overboard, and they are left drifting towards the Moon; meanwhile, Bombastus is captured by a party led by Mendoza and Spilorcio, and persuaded to build a rocket.

Arriving on the Moon, Maupertuis and Don Lope's party make contact with the King of the Moon, informing him of the return of Prince Jean. The King decides, as a precaution, to send Maupertuis and Don Lope seek the "Maître d'Armes", an Earthman of great military expertise, who had previously helped defeat the Prince. Meanwhile, Mendoza's party arrives and makes contact with Prince Jean; Mendoza is hired to raise an army from local tribes of mimes.

In their quest for the "Maître d'Armes", Maupertuis and Don Lope meet with the pirates again. They hire them for the journey to the "Maître d'Armes", only to be betrayed when the pirates turn out to have turned privateers in the service of Prince Jean. As the ship closes to her destination, Maupertuis and Don Lope escape when chimaeras attack. They find the "Maître d'Armes", who eventually agrees to help because he was friend with Lope's father.

As the Maître d'Armes gathers his three companions of the previous campaigns against Prince Jean, Mendoza's army marches upon the capital of the Moon. The heroes' party, grossly outnumbered, is quickly destroyed, and the capital falls in the hands of Prince Jean.

The heroes have survived, however, only Don Lope sustaining a musket wound, and the Maître d'Armes being taken prisoner. He escapes with Eusèbe's help, and flees into the wilderness, where he befriends the mime tribesmen. Meanwhile, Maupertuis and Don Lope's party plot to set the King free from his brother; to regain their honor lost serving the Prince, the pirates join them. As Prince Jean gives a party to celebrate his rise and put his brother to death, both parties execute their plans, while Mendoza's henchmen trigger their own attempt at a coup d'État. In the confusion, Prince Jean is taken prisoner, the king is restored to power, the mimes gain an equal social status with other Selenites, and Mendoza and Spilorcio are sent into hiding, while the lovers are reunited.

As Prince Jean is exiled from the Moon, the heroes discover that Séléné is actually the lost daughter of the King of the Moon. A love triangle appears when Armand's friends discover that Séléné seems to prefer the "Maître d'Armes" to Armand, and to be oblivious to Armand's love for her. The resulting tension breaks the friendship between Lope and Armand, and Armand stays on the Moon while Lope, Eusèbe, Kader, Andreo and Plaisant prepare to sail to Earth.

But Armand finally realizes that Séléné is in love with the "Maître d'Armes", and decides to leave them together and commit suicide. He is kept from jumping off a cliff by the news that his friends have been captured by Mendoza, who has commandeered their ship and is sailing back to Earth. He joins with the pirates and Bombastus to retrofit the pirates' moving house into a spaceship. They catch back with Mendoza, free their friends, and Armand kills Mendoza in a duel. As they talk of following Raïs Kader's plan to attack Maracaibo and free his daughter Yasmina, a story told by the pirate captain reveals that Yasmina is none other that the Bohemian Hermine, who had been with them from the start.

Once Kader and Lope find a way to finally fight their duel bloodlessly, the heroes make plans for their retirement: Don Lope and Hermine are to marry, Armand wishes to write about their adventures, Bombastus plans to return to the Moon through another zany invention, and Andreo and Plaisant become actors. But as Lope and Eusèbe escort Armand back to Venice, they find a damsel in danger and throw themselves in that new adventure.

== Influences ==
The comic draws inspiration from many literary classics, like Cyrano de Bergerac and Molière's works, but also from many classic fables, fairy tales, and even modern pop-culture.

As allusions to modern culture, writer Alain Ayroles notably mentions a pastiche of Andy Warhol's painting; architectural features alluding to Jules Verne and Space: 1999; and an explicit attempt to recreate the atmosphere of Alien (to which it is further alluded when Prince Jean is said to have planned to exile his brother into deep space "so that none shall hear him scream").

Allusions to classical culture are plentiful; writer Alain Ayroles notably mentions Bombastus drawing in the fashion of da Vinci, Hobbes' Leviathan and Rabelais.

The albums of the series are organised into "Acts", rather than tomes.

Many dialogues are written in alexandrines, though the typography does not always underline this feature.

== Volumes ==
- 1. Le Secret du janissaire (The Secret of the Janissary, 1995)
- 2. Pavillon noir ! (Jolly Roger!, 1997)
- 3. L'Archipel du danger (The Dangerous Archipelago, 1998)
- 4. Le Mystère de l'île étrange (The Mystery of the Weird Island, 2000)

The original edition of tome 4 comes with a one-act theatre play as a bonus, telling the meeting of Maupertuis and Don Lope.

- 5. Jean Sans Lune (John Lackmoon, 2002)
- 6. Luna incognita (Luna incognita, 2004)
- 7. Chasseurs de chimères (Chimaera hunters, 2006)
- 8. Le maître d'armes (The Swordmaster, 2007)
- 9. Revers de fortune (Change of Fortune, 2009)
- 10. De la Lune à la Terre (From the Moon to Earth, 2012)

Prequel series:

- 11. Vingt mois avant (2014)
- 12. Si ce n'est toi... (2016)

== See also ==
- Mythic fiction
- Fantasy comedy
- Garulfo
