= Garulfo =

Six-volume fantasy graphic novel, 1995–2002

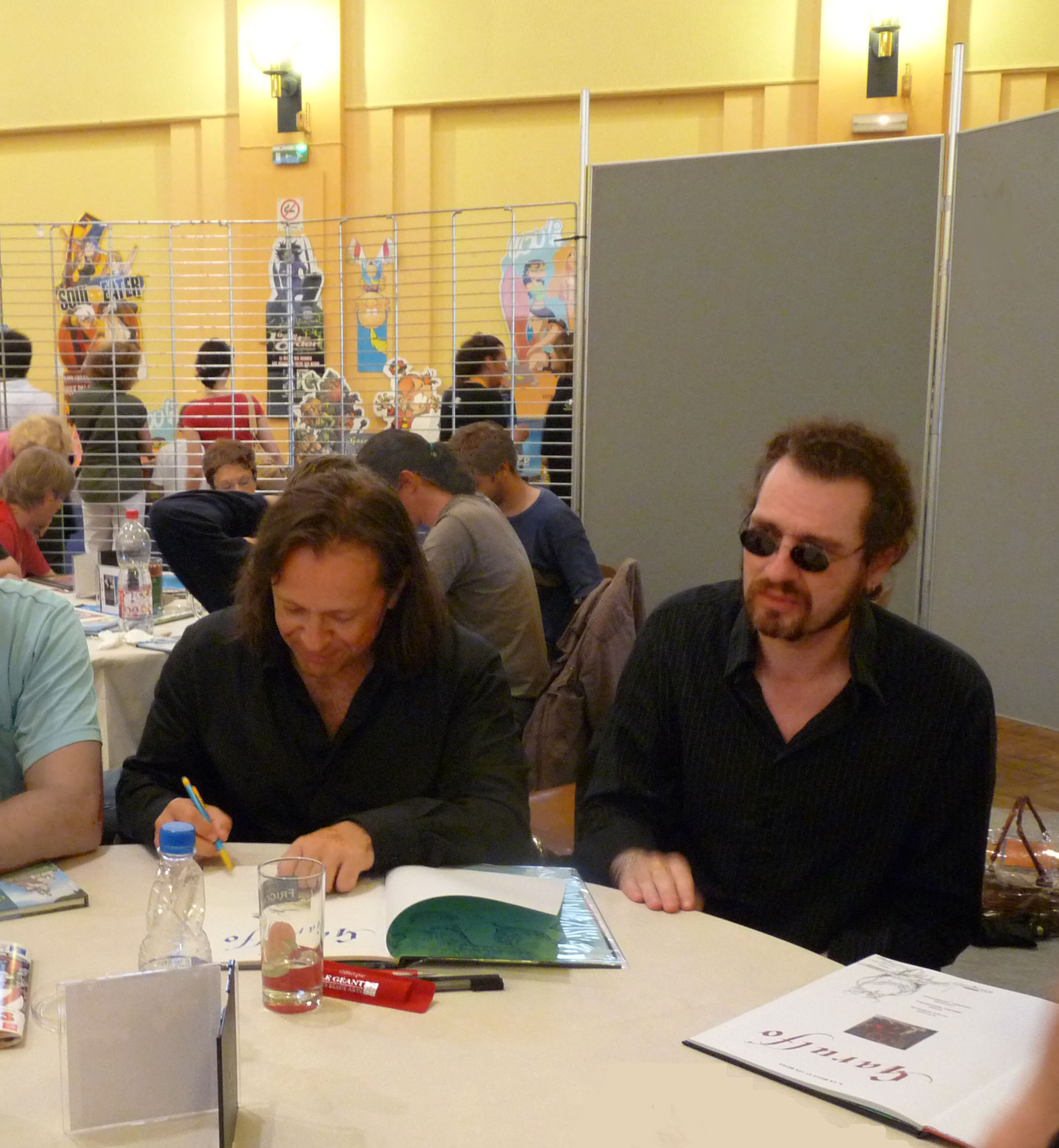
- Alain Ayroles and Bruno Maïorana at the European Comic Con, Strasbourg, France, in 2009
- Main characters: Garulfo, a frog Prince Romuald of Miralonde; Princess Hephilia of Brandelune
- Publisher: Guy Delcourt (editor) (France)

Creative team
- Writers: Alain Ayroles
- Artists: Bruno Maïorana
- Colourists: Thierry Leprévost

Original publication
- Date of publication: 1995–2002
- Language: French

Garulfo is a six-volume fantasy graphic novel created by writer Alain Ayroles, cartoonist Bruno Maïorana and colorist Thierry Leprévost.

Garulfo is a humorous modern fable inspired by traditional folklore, legends and fairy tales. It is set in an imaginary world that resembles Europe between the Middle Ages and the Renaissance. The lead character, Garulfo, is a frog who wants to become a man: a biped at the top of the food chain. With the help of a witch and a kiss from a maid he transforms into a prince. However, Garulfo soon realizes that man has a tendency to prey on his own kind, and that life as a frog was not so bad after all. The themes of environmentalism and humanism run throughout, with philosophical perspectives on privilege, social justice, poverty, economics, love, and death in the subtext.

== Synopsis ==
The story of Garulfo takes inspiration from traditional folklore and fairy tales to deliver a humorous, yet critical, vision of human society through the naïve eyes of a frog. It is divided into two books. The first tells of how Garulfo, an innocent frog tired of his condition and admiring of the human species, is metamorphasized into a charming prince - only to discover how cruel mankind can be. The second is based on the forced cooperation between the naïve Garulfo and Romuald, a vain prince who has been turned into a frog by his fairy godmother in order to learn some humility. The series is packed with cultural, literary and historical references, many hidden in the detailed drawings. The three kingdoms in the story represent three periods from the early Middle Ages through to the Renaissance; each is presented with historical accuracy although they remain firmly in the realm of fantasy.

- Book I: Garulfo, a frog, is weary of his miserable amphibian life, prey or victim to all the species in and around his pond - except humans. He dreams of becoming a man, a species whose power and ingenuity he admires, although his friend Fulbert, a duck, warns him about the danger of mankind. After a near death incident Garulfo decides to leave his pond to find a way to become a human. When he meets a witch, he persuades her to cast a spell that will turn him into a human if a princess kisses him. However, the Princess of the Kingdom, the beautiful Hephylia, is a spoiled and capricious girl and so it is a simple servant who ends up kissing Garulfo. Having become human, Garulfo, through clumsiness and lack of familiarity with human society, finds himself embroiled in an adventure that reveals the cruelty of man.
- Book II: The beginning of Book II takes place at the same time as much of Book I but instead follows the adventures of the vain young Prince Romuald who finds himself turned into a frog for no apparent reason. It seems that Garulfo and the Prince have exchanged bodies, and the witch's spell is but a ploy to teach the Prince some humility. When Garulfo becomes a frog again Prince Romuald resumes his appearance, but the witch realizes that he has still not learned his lesson and so decides to turn him back into a frog (and thus Garulfo into a prince). The two characters will only be able to regain their respective bodies when a princess agrees to kiss frog-prince Romuald. So, Garulfo and Romuald set out together to find a princess. It is love at first sight for Romuald when he sees Princess Hephylia for the first time, and he decides that only she is worthy of administering the kiss to break the spell. However, the reputation earned by Garulfo in Book I means that just getting close to Hephylia is a challenge in itself. When he finally gets the chance to be kissed by Hephylia, Romauld cannot go through with it because he realises that she has fallen in love with Garulfo. When an ogre imprisons the Princess, Romuald decides he must become the man she wants him to be if they are ever to be together, as well as make amends for all the trouble he has caused Garulfo...

== Albums ==
=== Book I ===
- Volume 1 - From ponds to castles (1995) :: This first volume tells the story of Garulfo's life on the edge of his pond, and the events that lead to his transformation into a human.
- Volume 2 - From Bad to Worse (1996) :: Garulfo, in human form, makes enemies with influential members of the nobility and clergy.

=== Book II ===
- Volume 3 - The Prince with Two Faces (1997) :: The newborn Prince Romauld is promised humility by a witch posing as his fairy godmother.
- Volume 4 - The Ogre with Crystal Eyes (1998):: Princess Hephylia, has been sent to attend a joust in Lambrusquet - in the hope she will find a husband among the knights; instead she befriends an ogre.
- Volume 5 - Knights and Prowess (2000) :: With a kiss from Princess Hephylia as the prize, Romuald and Garulfo must find a way to win the tournament.
- Volume 6 - Beauty and the Beasts (2002):: In this last episode, Garulfo and Romuald must defeat a dark knight, while Hephylia is faced with the wrath of the ogre. The circumstances do not point to a happy ending...

== Origins ==
Garulfo was born out of Alain Ayroles' desire to turn the classic fairy tale on its head. When he began to write it however, he realized that the tone contained more humor than wonder, which meant it would not work as a children's story. So, Ayroles chose to turn the idea into graphic novel. Initially, his plan was to take care of both the script and the drawings, so he did some sample pages and went to show them along with the script to several publishing houses. Although the script was welcomed, his drawing did not find approval with editors and Jean-Luc Loyer advised him to look for a cartoonist. Ayroles approached his friend Bruno Maïorana and they pitched the project together to Delcourt who agreed to publish the story.

The series was originally intended to be called The Metamorphoses of Garulfo, presumably in homage to Ovid's poem Metamorphoses, but the title was too long for the width of the album cover and so it was eventually shortened to Garulfo. When he started writing the series, Ayroles imagined a rather dark and desperate ending in order to reflect the logic of a philosophical tale that casts a critical eye over the human species. Ayroles and Maiorana were prepared to do a seventh album if they could find "an idea strong enough to continue without it being artificial" but the series ended with the sixth album.

== Inspiration and cultural references ==
=== Fairy Tales ===
The authors have drawn from various stories of classical folklore. The most obvious is the Frog Prince. It is this very tale that gives Garulfo the idea to ask the witch to transform him into a human as soon as he finds her. In Volume 3 two fairies present new-born Prince Romuald with magical gifts, but tradition has it that there should be three fairies. Invited out of necessity, the third ‘fairy’ gives him a prophecy - or a curse depending on the point of view. All in clear parallel with the tale of Sleeping Beauty. We also meet Little Thumb, who has been living alone since he got lost in the woods. There is a cross-over here with Hansel and Gretel when the princess leaves trail of pearls in the woods. While the ogre, who also owns the famous seven league boots, relates to the story of the Little Thumb, but the character is close to that of the beast in Beauty and the Beast. The character of Romuald also has much in common with the beast, despite his handsome face. The last characters to intrude from a fairy tale are the Marquis de Carabas and Master Felix, who are taken from Puss in Boots.

=== Literature and History ===
The balcony scene in Book II is inspired by Edmond Rostand's play Cyrano de Bergerac where Cyrano whispers lines to the uninspired Christian for the beautiful Roxanne, except that here the roles are reversed. At the end of the second volume in the scene where the dragon is destroying Brandelune, a character is escaping from a collapsed building, chains hanging from his wrists with his outfit and hair in every way the same as those of the king – thereby tempting the reader to think of a hidden twin and myths of the Man in the Iron Mask. There is also a clear reference to the legend of Saint George and the Dragon, which is subverted by the drawings of Bruno Maïorana.

The buildings, customs, vocabulary and fashions of the period are meticulously researched. Alain Ayroles even uses the notion of Medieval time using vespers minus ten for 5.50 pm and 30 compline for about 9.30 am.

The tournament is attended by the Knight of Guesclin, historically Bertrand du Guesclin a noble of Brittany who at 15 years old was banned from participating in tournaments. In disguise, he defeated all his opponents before refusing to fight his father.

The list of nobles held by the advisor to the King of Brandelune is full of famous names:

- Agilulfe, The Nonexistent Knight in the service of Charlemagne from Italo Calvino's novel.
- Galahad, knight of Arthurian legend.
- Ganelon, a literary character in The Song of Roland.
- Gargantua, noble giant from the novel of the same name by François Rabelais.
- Gausbert, Count of Roussillon and Empuries from 915 to 930 known for fighting the Saracens.
- Gauthier d'Aulnay, Norman Knight from 1312, the lover of Blanche of Burgundy.
- Gerald, possibly referring to Gerald of Wales
- Behind the hand of the scribe we can see bits of names: "car" "orak" and "oth" the second likely referring to Goldorak the robot from the Japanese cartoon of the same name and so the third is probably Golgoth - one of his enemies.

=== Popular culture ===
Garulfo being chased by the pike recreates the famous scene from Jaws with his zoom on the future victim. There is a scene reminiscent of Alien Resurrection. The King of Brandelune orders Garulfo's head cut off with the same energy as Disney's Queen of Hearts from Alice in Wonderland. Garulfo's escape with Pipa is an ode to swashbuckling characters like Zorro: the threatened heroes, blocked on the stairs, swing onto a chandelier and are catapulted from a table across the room. An aviation combat scene also takes place between the Grand Duke and a heron using air force jargon. Later, the ogre climbs to the top of a tower carrying the blonde princess at arm's length in a tribute to King Kong. In Brandelune Castle, a tapestry shows a typical scene from a children's cartoon.

=== Humour ===
Garulfo is not a parody. Although Ayroles' story is inspired by many fairy tales it never turns to pastiche. Much of the storytelling and visual humour is inspired by Monty Python and the films of Terry Gilliam. The tales by Italian author Italo Calvino are also one of Ayroles key influences. The Comics Journal describes the Garulfo series as "a real hoot; fast-paced action collides with silliness, situation comedy, jokes, plot twists and visual gags".

== Publication and Reception ==
Garulfo's six volumes were published in French by Delcourt between 1995 and 2002 in the Terres de Legends collection. An omnibus edition was published for Book I in 2003 and Book II in 2004. Two special large format, black and white collectors editions were released in 2014 by Snorgleux Editions. The series was pre-published in BoDoï as well as Pavilion Rouge. More than 743,000 copies of Garulfo and De cape et de crocs, Ayroles' other flagship series, had been sold by 2006. Book I has been published in Italian and Korean while both I and II are available in German (Splitter), Danish, and Dutch (Zelhem).

In 1998 writer Alain Ayroles won the Petit Robert prize for best comics writer at Quai des Bulles for Garulfo and De cape et de crocs. By 2000 Garulfo had reached "cruising speed" with a solid fanbase and by 2006 had become instrumental in Delcourt's ongoing publishing success story. Readers in France have consistently awarded Garulfo 5-star reviews throughout its publication, including for the omnibus editions that were released after the series was completed.

In 2009 at the Angoulême International Comics Festival artwork from Garulfo was displayed as part of the "Theatre of marvels" exhibition.

== Bibliography ==
Garulfo, illustrated by Bruno Maïorana, colors by Thierry Leprévost:

- 1 Ayroles, Alain (1995). De mares en châteaux [From ponds to castles] (in French). Paris: Delcourt. ISBN 2-84055-045-8.
- 2 Ayroles, Alain (1996). De mal en pis [From bad to worse] (in French). Paris: Delcourt. ISBN 2-84055-087-3.
- 3 Ayroles, Alain (1997). Le prince aux deux visages [The Prince with Two Faces] (in French). Paris: Delcourt. ISBN 2-84789-512-4.
- 4 Ayroles, Alain (1998). L'ogre aux yeux de cristal [The Ogre with Crystal Eyes] (in French). Paris: Delcourt. ISBN 978-2-84055-237-6.
- 5 Ayroles, Alain (2000). Preux et prouesse [Knights and Prowess] (in French). Paris: Delcourt. ISBN 2-84055-334-1.
- 6 Ayroles, Alain (2002). La belle et les bêtes [Beauty and the Beasts] (in French). Paris: Delcourt. ISBN 978-2-84055-579-7.
