= Blacksad =

Comic series

- Cover of Blacksad: Volume 1: Somewhere Within the Shadows
- Author(s): Juan Díaz Canales and Juanjo Guarnido
- Website: http://www.blacksadmania.com/
- Launch date: November 2000
- Publisher: Dargaud
- Genre: Detective

Blacksad is a noir comic series created by Spanish authors Juan Díaz Canales (writer) and Juanjo Guarnido (artist), and published by publisher Dargaud in album format. Though both authors are Spanish, their main target audience for Blacksad was the French market, publishing all Blacksad volumes in French first; the Spanish edition followed about one month later. The first volume, Quelque part entre les ombres (literally Somewhere between the Shadows, but simply called Blacksad in the US), was published in November 2000. The second volume, Arctic-Nation, was published in 2003 and the third, Âme Rouge (Red Soul), was published in 2005. An English translation of the third volume was delayed due to the bankruptcy of its North American publisher, iBooks. In 2010, Dark Horse Comics published all three translated volumes as one volume. The publication of this 184-page collection also coincided with the European release of the series' fourth installment, L'Enfer, le silence (literally The Hell, the silence), in September 2010. In 2014, a fifth installment of the series, Amarillo, was released in various translations.

The series has been translated into Arabic, Bulgarian, Catalan, Chinese, Croatian, Czech, Danish, Dutch, English, Finnish, German, Greek, Hungarian, Icelandic, Italian, Japanese, Norwegian, Polish, Portuguese, Romanian, Russian, Serbian, Slovenian, Swedish, Turkish and Ukrainian.

Guarnido and Díaz Canales have received several prizes for the series, including three Eisner Award nominations in 2004, two Eisner Award wins in 2013, and an Angoulême Prize for Artwork. A video game adaptation of Blacksad, under the name Blacksad: Under the Skin, developed by Pendulo Studios, was released in 2019.

== Synopsis ==
Rendered in a film noir style, the stories are set in late 1950s United States. All of the characters are anthropomorphic animals whose species reflects their personality, character type and role in the story. Animal stereotypes are often used: for example, nearly all of the policemen are canids, such as German Shepherds, Bloodhounds, and foxes, while underworld characters are often reptiles or amphibians. Female characters are often much more human-looking than their male counterparts.

The strip attempts to reflect a dirty, realist outlook and a dark cinematic style through fairly clean, realistic lines. Detailed watercolor drawings, including real-life places and cities, also contribute to the realistic feel of the series, despite the fact that characters are animals. The style of drawing has evolved throughout the series, with later issues displaying sharper, higher-quality colour and fewer grainy lines.

== Cameos ==
The series occasionally features anthropomorphic versions of famous people, most notably in Red Soul. Adolf Hitler is portrayed as a cat (possibly in homage to Art Spiegelman's Maus), Senator Joseph McCarthy as Senator Gallo (a rooster), Mark Rothko as Sergei Litvak (a brown bear), and Allen Ginsberg as Abraham Greenberg (a bison), while Otto Liebber (an owl) bears a strong resemblance to many of the scientists involved in the Manhattan Project at Los Alamos. Jack Kerouac is portrayed as Chad Lowell (a lion) in Amarillo, and Robert Moses as Lewis Solomon (a peregrine falcon) in They All Fall Down.

== Main characters ==
- John Blacksad – hardboiled private investigator and tuxedo cat who was raised in poverty. He has good marksmanship and fighting skills due to his rough upbringing and service in World War II. Once a college history major before being expelled, Blacksad narrates with cynical commentary. He's unable to form lasting romantic relationships, often due to uncontrollable circumstances. He uses the alias John H. Blackmore on several fake IDs.
- Weekly – Blacksad's occasional sidekick. A weasel with an odor problem, he has a near-constant optimistic attitude, working as a muckraker for a tabloid called the What's News. His job and size enables him to aid Blacksad gather information by going undercover.
- Smirnov – Police commissioner and friend of Blacksad. A German Shepherd, Smirnov sometimes helps Blacksad to reach the rich and powerful which he himself cannot touch due to "pressure upstairs". He's willing to bend the rules to ensure all criminals are justly punished.

== Volumes ==
The first three volumes were translated into English and released by American publisher Dark Horse Comics as a single graphic novel entitled Blacksad.

=== Somewhere Within the Shadows ===
Blacksad investigates the murder of the famous actress Natalia Wilford, whom he used to be involved with – first as a bodyguard, then in a more intimate capacity.

Blacksad's first inquiries lead him to screenwriter Léon Kronski, a lion who was Natalia's last known lover and has since disappeared. He finds Kronski already dead and buried under a pseudonym. After Blacksad is severely beaten by two hired thugs, the police arrest him. Smirnov explains to Blacksad that because of "pressure upstairs" he himself cannot investigate the matter any further. Smirnov offers him a deal, advantageous to both sides.

As Blacksad returns home, two contract killers – a monitor lizard named Fiston and a rat – attempt to kill him. Blacksad shoots the rat, interrogates the dying goanna and finally uncovers the culprit of the whole affair: Ivo Statoc, a cane toad businessman who considers himself above any law. Statoc himself shot the actress because of her infidelity. After brutally infiltrating the office suite at the top of his skyscraper, Blacksad confronts the completely calm and cold-blooded Statoc – who first offers him a job, and then a bribe. Blacksad rejects both offers as a matter of principle and shoots Statoc in the head. The police arrange it so it appears to be a suicide.

=== Arctic Nation ===
Blacksad is hired by schoolteacher Miss Grey (deer) to investigate the disappearance of a young girl, Kaylie (brown bear), in a racially divided suburb known as The Line. Suspicion initially falls on Arctic Nation, a white supremacist organization led by Huk (Arctic fox), who has ties to Police Chief Karup (polar bear). During the investigation, Blacksad partners with a journalist named Weekly and encounters both Arctic Nation and a militant black power group, the Black Claws, amid escalating racial tensions.

Kaylie’s mother, Dinah, is later found murdered, deepening suspicion around Karup and his associates. Blacksad eventually discovers that Kaylie and Weekly have been held captive at an Arctic Nation gathering. Following a violent confrontation, Kaylie is rescued.

It is ultimately revealed that the kidnapping was orchestrated by Jezabel, Karup’s wife and Dinah’s twin sister, as part of a revenge scheme against Karup for abandoning their mother years earlier. The story concludes on an ambiguous note regarding Kaylie’s future.

There are probably some discrepancies between publications. Cotten, a gambling addicted magpie who secretly worked for Huk after Huk promised to take him to Las Vegas, is also seen as Hewitt, Kayleigh as Kaylie, and some versions of the book end with Blacksad scattering Cotten's (Hewitt's) ashes to the wind over Vegas, fulfilling his last wish.

=== Red Soul ===
During the Red Scare, Blacksad is hired as a bodyguard for Hewitt Mandeline (tortoise) and later reconnects with his former teacher, nuclear physicist Otto Liebber, at a public lecture hosted by philanthropist Samuel Gotfield (Dalmatian dog). Gotfield invites several intellectuals, including Otto, to his mansion. Soon after, Otto becomes the target of an assassination attempt, and one of his associates is killed by a hired assassin.

As suspicion grows, Blacksad learns that Otto previously worked for the Third Reich and may be involved in passing nuclear secrets to the Soviet Union. FBI agents intensify their investigation, arresting Alma Mayer (cat), Gotfield’s fiancée, and accidentally killing painter Sergei Litvak during questioning. Blacksad rescues Alma and discovers that Litvak concealed stolen nuclear information within one of his paintings, which is being shipped overseas. Blacksad intercepts the artwork before it reaches East Berlin.

Blacksad is later framed for Litvak’s death and interrogated by Senator Gallo. He uncovers evidence that Gotfield betrayed Alma to gain political favor and secure a place in a government nuclear shelter program. Using this evidence, Blacksad forces the authorities to drop the charges against him. Otto’s death is staged to allow him to leave the country.

Although Otto later writes that he has returned to Germany, Alma leaves Blacksad after believing he betrayed Otto. The story ends with Blacksad alone and unable to find her.

=== A Silent Hell ===
Blacksad and Weekly travel to New Orleans to investigate the disappearance of jazz musician Sebastian “Little Hand” Fletcher (Boxer dog) at the request of his former manager, Faust LaChapelle (goat), who is reportedly terminally ill. Fletcher, a talented performer struggling with heroin addiction, had recently vanished under suspicious circumstances. During their investigation, Blacksad learns that several of Fletcher’s former bandmates have died in staged suicides.

Clues point to a broader conspiracy tied to Fletcher’s hometown, where a fraudulent flu remedy sold by a man known as “Dr. Dupre” caused deformities and long-term health problems among local children, including Fletcher. Fletcher’s latest song publicly recounts these events and suggests corruption that allowed Dupre to avoid prosecution.

Blacksad eventually discovers that LaChapelle is in fact Dupre and that he concealed his identity while investing in medical research to cure a hereditary condition affecting his family. It is also revealed that a detective named Leeman (hippopotamus) killed Fletcher’s former associates to prevent them from exposing the past. Fletcher ultimately dies after being given poisoned heroin, apparently to stop him from performing his new song.

The story concludes with Fletcher’s funeral and uncertainty over whether LaChapelle’s crimes will ever be publicly revealed.

=== Amarillo ===
While on vacation in New Orleans, Blacksad accepts a job transporting a wealthy client’s car to Tulsa, Oklahoma. The vehicle is stolen by two vagrant writers, Chad and Abraham, whose volatile friendship centers on their competing views of art and success. After Abraham publicly humiliates Chad and admits to mailing Chad’s unpublished novel away without permission, Chad shoots him in anger and flees in the stolen car.

Blacksad pursues Chad across the Southwest with the assistance of a lawyer, Neal Beato (spotted hyena), eventually tracking him to a traveling circus. There, Chad becomes involved with a performer named Luanne (Siamese cat) and is implicated in the death of another circus member during a violent altercation. The circus attempts to cover up the incident and abandon Chad, but he escapes with Luanne.

As Blacksad closes in, further confrontations result in the accidental death of Neal. Overcome with guilt for killing Abraham and causing additional harm, Chad ultimately confesses to the authorities.

The story ends with Blacksad returning to New York, while Chad’s discarded manuscript is discovered by a stranger, leaving its fate uncertain.

The American version features an introduction by Neal Adams, who co-translated the book into English.

=== They All Fall Down ===
Parts one and two of a four-part story were released on 20 October and 17 November 2021; the two concluding volumes were released later. Dark Horse has published complete English edition of " They All Fall Down" in two parts

In Central Park, Blacksad and Weekly attend a performance that is interrupted when police arrest its director, Iris Allen (llama), on dubious charges. As Weekly struggles to secure a major story for his newspaper’s new editor, Carlo Tedesco (porcupine), he begins covering renowned architect Solomon, who is overseeing construction of a massive suspension bridge. Meanwhile, Blacksad is hired by Transport Workers Union president Kenneth Clarke (leaf-nosed bat) to prevent an assassination attempt by a mafia hitman named Logan (wolverine).

Blacksad foils Logan’s attempt, but Kenneth is soon murdered by an unknown assailant who escapes through hidden tunnels. Investigating further, Blacksad identifies the killer as Shelby (gull), an associate of Solomon. Suspicion falls on Solomon due to his conflicts with the transport union and his efforts to dismantle public transit. At the same time, Weekly uncovers evidence that appears to implicate Solomon, but before he can report it, he is knocked unconscious. Shelby subsequently murders Iris and frames Weekly for the crime.

As the theater troupe struggles to continue without Iris, a replacement actress reveals herself to be Alma, Blacksad’s former lover. Blacksad continues his investigation and gathers evidence linking Shelby to the murders, eventually clearing Weekly of suspicion. He also learns that corruption within the union runs deep, with successive leaders implicated in betrayals tied to Solomon’s projects.

Shelby’s actions are motivated by his ailing son, whose life has been sustained through Solomon’s financial support. When a citywide blackout leads to the boy’s death, Shelby seeks revenge and attempts to kill Solomon atop the nearly completed bridge. Blacksad intervenes, but Shelby falls to his death during the confrontation.

Months later, both the bridge and a new amphitheater funded by Iris’s supporters are completed. As Blacksad reunites with Alma, a violent storm exposes structural weaknesses in the bridge, leading to its collapse. In the aftermath, Solomon’s assistant is revealed to be Rachel Zucco (fox), who had been operating under an assumed identity, suggesting her covert involvement in the events leading up to the disaster.

=== Shorts ===
"Like Cats and Dogs" and "Spit at the Sky" were originally published in Pilote Spécial 2003 and Pilote Spécial Noël 2004; they have been collected in 2014's Blacksad L'intégrale, an omnibus edition of the first five Blacksad stories. In the English edition of "Silent Hell", published by Dark Horse, both short stories are collected.

=== Blacksad: The Sketch Files ===
A "behind the scenes" look at the making of the first Blacksad album from 2005, including preproduction art and interviews with Canales and Guarnido.

== Adaptations ==
=== Film version ===
In 2006, Variety reported that a film adaptation of Blacksad was in development. To be produced by Thomas Langmann and directed by Louis Leterrier (The Transporter, The Incredible Hulk), it was originally scheduled for a 2009 release. Alexandre Aja (The Hills Have Eyes, Piranha 3D) had also expressed interest in directing the film, which was reportedly budgeted around $100 million. Aja is currently working on Mice and Mystics for DreamWorks Animation. As of 2026, there have been no news about it.

=== Video game adaptation ===
Blacksad: Under the Skin is an adventure video game developed by Pendulo Studios and published by Microïds. It was released on 5 November 2019, on PC, PlayStation 4, Xbox One, with a Switch release scheduled for 10 December 2019. The idea of adapting Blacksad into a game was proposed by Microïds to Pendulo, as the publisher is owned by the same media conglomerate as Blacksad publisher Dargaud. The developer opted to create an original story not based on any particular Blacksad installment, but still took influence and inspiration from the existing series. The game was announced in July 2017, and its first teaser trailer was revealed in August 2018. By February 2019, the game had been in production for roughly two years. It was released on 14 November 2019, and a Nintendo Switch port of the game was released on 10 December 2019, to mixed critical reviews, many reviewers praised its atmosphere as being faithful to the comics, but criticized the game's many bugs, crashes, and long loading times.

=== Audiobook adaptation ===
The comic series received a French-language audiobook adaptation, courtesy of French company Blynd Productions. It featured Eric Herson-Macarel as Blacksad, Bernard Gabay as Smirnov and Ivan Gouillon as Ivo Statoc.
