= Slaloms (Lapinot) =

- Date: 1993 and 1997
- Series: Les formidables aventures de Lapinot
- Publisher: Dargaud

Creative team
- Writers: Lewis Trondheim
- Artists: Lewis Trondheim

Original publication
- Language: French

Translation

Chronology
- Followed by: Blacktown, 1995

Slaloms is a story in the comics series The spiffy adventures of McConey (Les formidables aventures de Lapinot in the original French language), by the popular French cartoonist Lewis Trondheim. It was first released in a smaller black-and-white format in 1993, then entirely redrawn for the 1997 re-release as volume 0 in the series.

== Plot ==
This adventure takes place in modern France and uses the normal continuing storyline of the series. It describes the holidays of Lapinot (a.k.a. McConey) and his friends Richard, Titi, and Pierrot in a winter sports resort. This volume is mostly a collection of unrelated episodes, although there are a few recurring links such as the much talked about but never seen wolf, (except for an ambiguous fog shape) which reportedly killed skiers in the area. The dialogue is sometimes philosophical, sometimes silly. This is the album where Lapinot first met Nadia, who would later on become his girlfriend, although she only plays a minor part here.
