= Jean-Luc Masbou =

French cartoonist

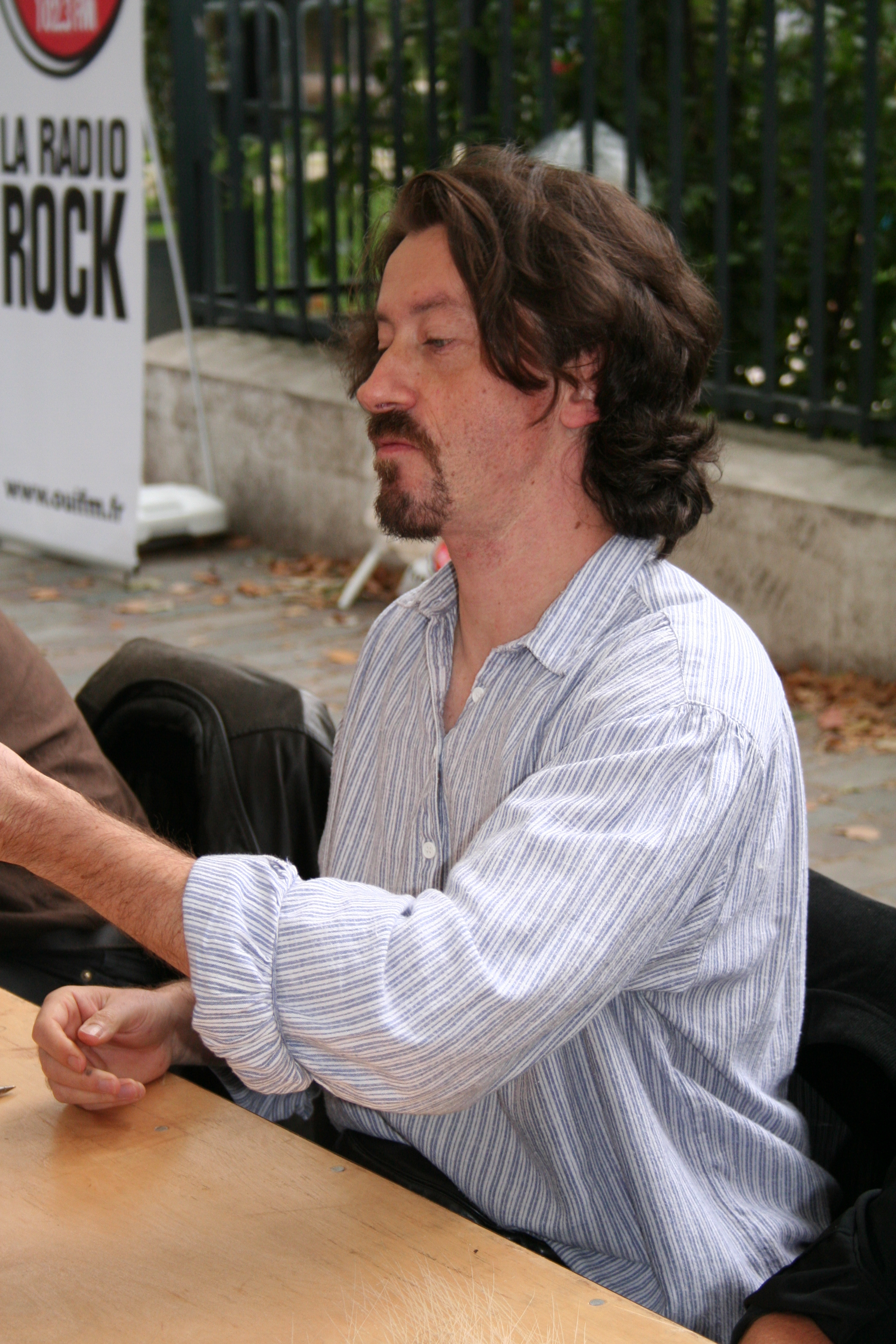
- Jean-Luc Masbou at Delcourt Festival 2006
- Born: 14 March 1963 (age 62); Figeac
- Known for: Comics
- Notable work: De cape et de crocs, L'Ombre de l'échafaud

Jean-Luc Masbou (born in Figeac on 14 March 1963) is a French cartoonist.

Masbou studied at the École supérieure de l'image of Angoulême. He has published the series L'Ombre de l'échafaud, for which he wrote the scenario, and the series De cape et de crocs as a cartoonist.

== Works ==
- De cape et de crocs written by Alain Ayroles
  - Tome 1 : Le secret du Janissaire
  - Tome 2 : Pavillon noir !
  - Tome 3 : L'archipel du danger
  - Tome 4 : Le mystère de l'île étrange
  - Tome 5 : Jean sans lune
  - Tome 6 : Luna Incognita
  - Tome 7 : Chasseurs de Chimères
  - Tome 8 : Le Maître d'armes
  - Tome 9 : Revers de fortune
- L'Ombre de l'échafaud (scenario by Jean-Luc Masbou, cartoons by David Cerqueira and Sophie Barou)
  - Tome 1 : L'affaire Brignou
  - Tome 2 : L'Affaire Dudanne
  - Tome 3 : L'Affaire Valkoviak
- Empire Céleste (scenario by Jean-Luc Masbou, cartoons by Minh-Than Duong and Thierry Leprévost)
  - Tome 1 : Dragon et tigre

== Sources and references ==
- De Cape et de Crocs
