= Guy Delcourt (editor) =

French publisher and editor of comics

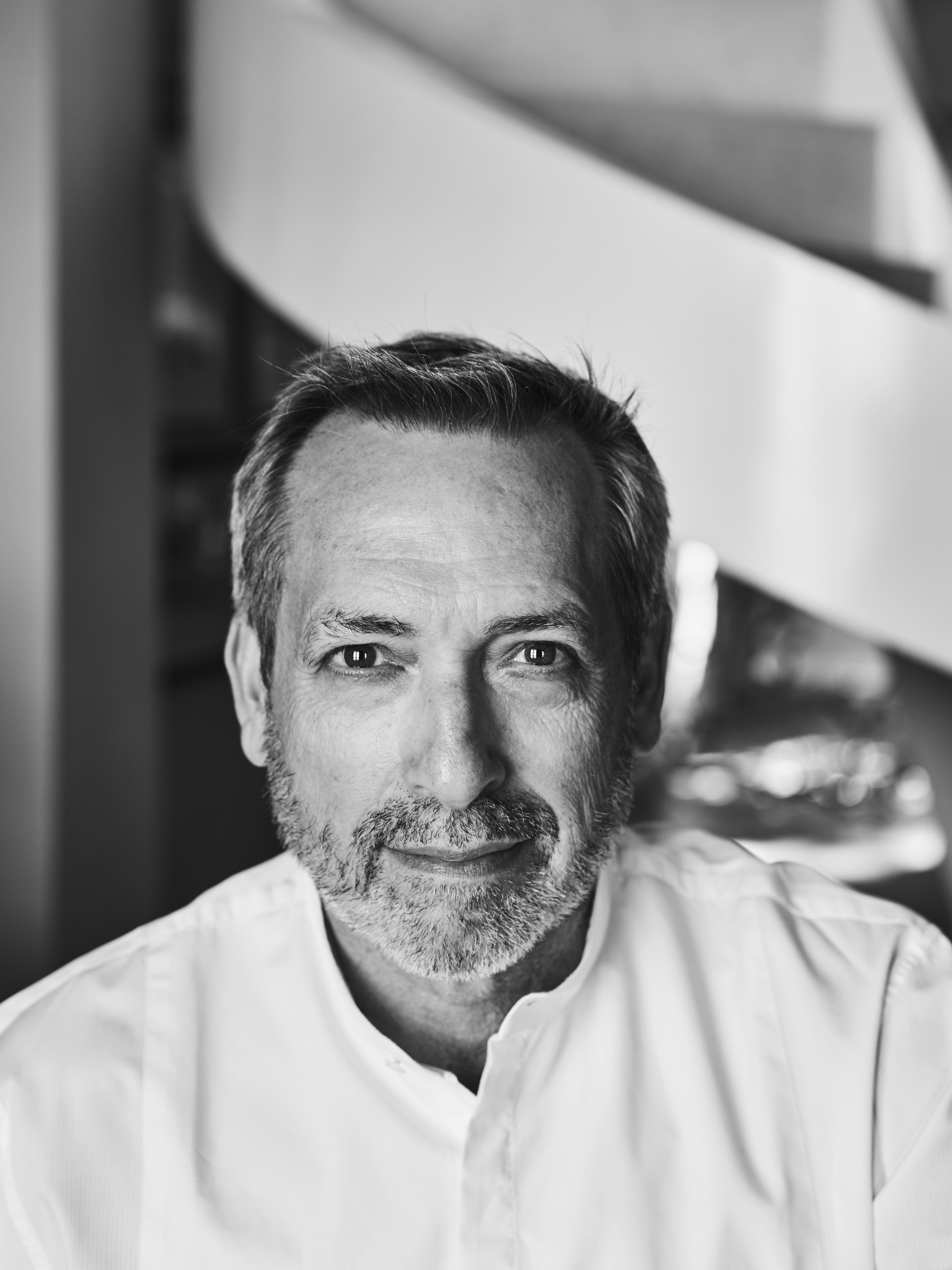
- Born: 27 March 1958 (age 68); Versailles, France
- Education: École supérieure des sciences économiques et commerciales

Guy Delcourt (French: [dɛlkuʁ]; born 27 March 1958) is a French editor, founder of the Delcourt publishing house in 1986. It has since grown into one of the largest publishers of comics in France.

In November 2006, he received the rank of Chevalier in the Ordre national du Mérite, awarded by the President of the Republic Jacques Chirac, as proposed by the Minister of Culture, Renaud Donnedieu de Vabres.

The company grew from publishing three titles in 1986, to over 200 in 2006. With over 1200 titles by the end 2005, Delcourt's success has not been based on the popularity of a single series. Leading titles in 2006 included Sillage (850,000 sold), Aquablue (792,000 sold), Fruits Basket (750,000 sold), De Cape et de Crocs/Garulfo (743,000 sold), Le Chant des Stryges (670,000 sold), Dungeon (comics) (634,000 ex), Star Wars (540,000), Carmen & Travis (480,000), Golden City (435,000), Les Blagues de Toto (350,000 ex), Nana (315,000). These accounted for 47% of turnover in 2006, with Manga accounting for 35% and new releases for 16%.

2018 saw the creation of the literature department with La Croisée (foreign fiction), then Marchialy (narrative non-fiction) and Les Avrils (French literature).

In 2021, an innovative publishing adventure began with Verytoon, a platform dedicated to webtoons, the first purely digital mode of creating, distributing and reading comics.
