= Broken Sword: The Shadow of the Templars (2002 video game) =

2002 adventure game

- North American cover art
- Developer: Revolution Software
- Publisher: BAM! Entertainment
- Director: Charles Cecil
- Producer: Steve Ince
- Programmer: Tony Warriner
- Composer: Ben McCullough
- Series: Broken Sword
- Platform: Game Boy Advance
- Release: NA: March 14, 2002; EU: March 22, 2002
- Genre: Adventure
- Mode: Single-player

Broken Sword: The Shadow of the Templars is an adventure video game developed by Revolution Software and published by BAM! Entertainment for the Game Boy Advance (GBA) handheld game console. It is based on the original game of the same name from 1996. and released in North America and Europe in March 2002.

The designers chose to build the game from the ground up and picking what content from the original was most important to include. A major change from the original version was the control scheme: the original was a point-and-click adventure game using a computer mouse, but in the port, the player uses the GBA's d-pad to control the main character and his actions. The GBA version was later used as the basis for Broken Sword: Shadow of the Templars - The Director's Cut for convenience reasons. While the second game in the series, Broken Sword II: The Smoking Mirror, was planned to have a GBA title as well, it was canceled at the last minute when the studio shut down, leaving The Shadow of the Templars as the sole game in the franchise for the GBA.

Broken Sword puts the player in control of George Stobbart, a bystander during a bombing attack at a Paris café that causes the death of a man. He works with investigative journalist Nico Collard to find out the truth being the attack, which leads to him discovering a secret society and its conspiracy. Broken Sword received generally positive reception, with the biggest praise tending to be towards the plot and characters. The new control layout was praised as well, with a Hardcore Gamer writer claiming that he would have used it on the PC version if it was available. The biggest complaints tend to be directed at content limited by the GBA's comparatively weak system capabilities, including graphical fidelity, audio quality, a lack of voice acting, and missing content from the original. It was also criticized for multiple game-breaking bugs.

== Plot ==
The plot of Broken Sword: The Shadow of the Templars is largely the same as it was in the original version, with exceptions made for cut dialogue. The player assume control of protagonist George Stobbart, who is sitting at a cafe when a clown sets off an explosive in it, killing a man in the process. He seeks to investigate this murder, allying with investigative journalist Nico Collard in the process. They meet various people along the way, some of whom are connected to the murder in some way as they explore various countries, including France, Spain, Ireland, and Syria. They also discover a vast conspiracy regarding the Knights Templar, particularly that the victim himself was a member of this organization and was targeted by an assassin opposing the Templars. When George finds the Knights Templar, he is offered the opportunity to join them, though he rejects the offer and sets off an explosion among the followers to escape.

== Gameplay ==
Broken Sword: The Shadow of the Templars is a 2D adventure game played from a third-person perspective. The player must solve puzzles and talk to various non-playable characters (NPCs) throughout the game in order to progress. The player also collect various objects, which can be used and combined in order to solve puzzles. These items and item combos can be used on the environment or given to an NPC. In some scenarios, failing to solve a puzzle or interaction quick enough, or doing it incorrectly, can result in George dying and the player having to resume from their last save point.

Whereas other versions of Broken Sword has point-and-click adventure gameplay, the player have direct control over George Stobbart. This was done to make it easier to play on a smaller screen. Additionally, the player can hold down a button to show every point of interaction, and be able to select one of those points to have George walk over and interact with it.

== Development ==
To fit the background images on the cartridge, they were compressed in JPEG format, then decompressed, with any artifacts caused by the process cleaned up afterward.

Broken Sword: The Shadow of the Templars was developed by Revolution Software for the Game Boy Advance (GBA). Partially inspired by their development of other Broken Sword versions, including a Java browser game version and an iPAQ Pocket PC version, the concept began as a "mad suggestion" according to director Charles Cecil. Starting with a prototype of the graphics engine, after testing basic gameplay they realized that such a project was feasible. Proper development of the game began in May 2001, and Revolution Software co-founder Tony Warriner estimated that the team would expand to 5-6 people, a comparatively small portion of staff. It was largely Warriner and Steve Ince who worked on the project, with Warriner regarding it as one of his proudest achievements to complete.

Where the original Broken Sword: The Shadow of the Templars used Revolution's Virtual Theatre engine, this game created a new engine for this title. While designing the game, they prioritized parts of the original that were the most vital to implement first, then as space permitted added less vital aspects. The backgrounds used JPEG image compression, and the design team had to cut them down and compress them even more to make them fit on the cartridge. Head of game development Francesco Iorio noted that the uncompressed images alone would have taken up 7MB of space, and through their efforts, the graphics were reduced in size to only 1.95MB. JPEG compression was chosen due to how well-suited it is for detailed images, as well as its power and flexibility. When compressing background images, they set the backgrounds' global quality level as low as they reasonably could, and then cleaned up any artifacts that appeared when the images were decompressed. When picking the graphics mode for the game, they went with a screen mode that supports 256 colors due to its compatibility with the game's art style.

The soundtrack of the original version was recomposed as MIDI songs for the GBA version due to size constraints. The original game's composer, Barrington Pheloung, worked with the designers of this version in order to ensure that all significant cues from the original made it into this game. Other aspects of the game however were modified, such as the removal of optional dialogue for certain actions, such as side tangents. In addition due to criticisms regarding the goat puzzle in the original Broken Sword, efforts were made to address these issues. An additional room was also added to the game in a sewer area, which was meant to tie into one of the sequels, Broken Sword: The Sleeping Dragon.

The game's quality assurance was conducted by its publisher BAM! Entertainment and the final product was approved by Nintendo. Despite this, Broken Sword on GBA has multiple potentially game-breaking glitches, including one that causes the game to become impossible to complete if the player visits Spain before they have visited Syria. This issue was compounded by the official walkthrough which tells players to go to Spain before it tells them to go to Syria. In a 2018 interview, Cecil apologized to anyone who experienced it.

== Release ==
Some time after the initial announcement of the game, Revolution Software later announced that it had partnered with BAM! Entertainment to publish the game in North America and Europe. According to Cecil, the team was impressed by BAM! Entertainment, particularly its plans for the game as well as its understanding of the Broken Sword series, which lead them to choose BAM! Entertainment instead of other prospective publishers. The game was produced on an 8MB cartridge, though Warriner noted that BAM! was insistent on using a 4MB cartridge instead. The game was able to fit on the cartridge with 8 bytes to spare.

It was originally slated for a Holiday 2001 release before being pushed back to April 12, 2002, and then forward to a March 14 release in North America and March 22 in Europe.

== Reception ==
Reception

Aggregate score
Aggregator	Score
Metacritic	80/100

Review scores
Publication	Score
Eurogamer	8/10
GameSpot	7/10
IGN	7.5/10

Broken Sword: The Shadow of the Templars received generally positive reception, with Metacritic noting that it received "generally favorable reviews". In their review of the game, Eurogamer writer Gestalt appreciated that the game didn't take itself too seriously, though also felt that the humor could be "hit or miss". They also praised its control scheme, noting that while adventure game fans might consider this cheating, it was helpful to be able to cycle through points of interest on the GBA's small screen. Additional praise was given to the visuals, noting only occasional noticeable compression artifacts. While they enjoyed the music, they were saddened by the lack of audio outside of it. IGN writer Hilary Goldstein found both the visuals and sound to be a great demonstration of what could be done on the GBA. He also praised the story and dialogue, though felt that the game was somewhat easy and wouldn't appeal to people who are interested in more action-focused games. The Guardian staff felt that the game's visuals were good despite the GBA's dark screen. As to whether other people would enjoy it or not, the staff noted it depended on the way they used their GBA, saying those who prefer "quick, mindless thrills" would prefer Mario Kart instead. GamePro writer Fennecfox felt that the developer did an "amazing job" on bringing this game to the GBA, giving high regard to the graphics and gameplay changes, though felt that the music was lacking.

Hardcore Gamer writer Geoff Thew was critical of the quality of its port. He cited the animated cutscenes, "beautiful sprites and backgrounds", and "iconic music" as having been ruined by the hardware limitation of the GBA. Despite this, he praised it for how enjoyable it was, as well as praising the developers for successfully translating a point-and-click game to a handheld. The changes made to the controls from the PC version were also praised, with Thew saying that he would use its control style in the PC version if it was an option. Kurt Kalata of Hardcore Gaming 101 was similarly critical of what he felt was a poor presentation of the game as well as the presence of game-breaking glitches, and did not give it a pass for its "shoddy quality" despite it being a rarity on the GBA. AllGame's Scott Alan Marriott found aspects of the game enjoyable, but stated that the limitations of the GBA hurt it some, adding that something like the ability to zoom in would help make the game more playable. Nevertheless, despite noting issues with the audio, he felt that it was better than the average GBA game. Nintendo World Report writer Daniel Bloodworth felt that the transition from PC to GBA went as well as it could have gone, though stated his belief that the game lost personality. He found further issue with characters' expressions not changing, a loss of background detail, and the lack of voice acting. GameSpot writer Tim Tracy enjoyed the gameplay, story, and graphics. Though found the audio sparse, he noted that the relative lack of audio helped make suspenseful music more impactful when it started. GameZone writer Michael Lafferty found both the audio and visuals good, and while he took issue with how convoluted it can be at times to progress, he found it enjoyable to play.

== Legacy ==
The sequel to Broken Sword, Broken Sword II: The Smoking Mirror, was originally planned to release on the GBA and was nearly complete. Warriner had planned before the release of Broken Sword to bring it as well as its sequel, Broken Sword: The Sleeping Dragon, to the GBA. The Smoking Mirror was shown during E3 2002, and featured the same mechanics as the first GBA version. In addition, the designers were willing to consider re-releasing Beneath a Steel Sky and Lure of the Temptress on the handheld if the two Broken Sword games proved successful, and plans were considered to release "original adventures" in the Broken Sword and Steel Sky series on GBA. However, the GBA version of The Smoking Mirror was ultimately canceled after BAM! Entertainment went under, with only weeks left of development.

When developing Broken Sword: Shadow of the Templars - The Director's Cut for the Nintendo DS, the designers used the GBA version of the game as the basis. The DS version was regarded as more faithful by Warriner than the GBA version, though it still lacked certain game elements present in the non-handheld versions. Because the GBA version had so many bugs, this caused publisher Ubisoft and the design team to spend a long time repairing the issues with the game.
