= Broken Sword: Shadow of the Templars – The Director's Cut =

2009 video game

- European Wii cover art
- Developer: Revolution Software
- Publishers: Ubisoft (Wii, Nintendo DS); Revolution Software (Mac OS X, iOS, Android); Kalypso Media (Windows)
- Director: Charles Cecil
- Composer: Barrington Pheloung
- Series: Broken Sword
- Platforms: Wii; Nintendo DS; iOS; Windows; OS X; Android; Linux
- Release: Wii: AU: March 19, 2009; EU: March 20, 2009; NA: March 24, 2009; Nintendo DS: AU: March 19, 2009; NA: March 24, 2009; EU: March 27, 2009; iOS: NA: January 24, 2010; NA: May 26, 2010 (HD); Windows, OS X: NA: September 2, 2010; Android: WW: June 28, 2012; Linux: WW: June 18, 2013
- Genre: Adventure
- Mode: Single-player

Broken Sword: Shadow of the Templars – The Director's Cut is a 2009 enhanced remake and director's cut of the classic 1996 point-and-click adventure game Broken Sword: The Shadow of the Templars developed by Revolution Software. It was released for Wii, Nintendo DS, iOS, Microsoft Windows, OS X, Android and Linux spanning 2009 to 2012. The player assumes the roles of George Stobbart and Nicole Collard, who was a pivotal but not a playable character in the original version.

After being petitioned to bring Broken Sword to the Wii and Nintendo DS, Revolution decided to create a director's cut. Comic book artist Dave Gibbons created additional artwork for the game. The game received positive reviews from critics, and is often listed as one of the best games on the Wii, DS and iOS/Android mobile devices. It was also a commercial success, outselling the third and fourth Broken Sword installments.

== Gameplay ==
Broken Sword: Shadow of the Templars – The Director's Cut is a 2D adventure game played from a third-person perspective. Unlike in the original game, where George Stobbart is the only playable character, Nicole "Nico" Collard is controllable for selected game sections. Depending on the platform, the game is played through a point-and-click interface, touch user interface, and Wii Remote. While certain puzzles from the original segments were simplified, new first-person puzzles were also added. Hotspots are highlighted, and a hint system is added, along with a diary in which the player character takes notes. Unlike the original game, however, the Director's Cut does not allow players to get a game over from making fatal mistakes that get their character killed, as player death scenes were removed as part of a larger effort to censor the game.

== Plot ==
The game opens in Paris, a day before the original game's start, with journalist Nicole Collard receiving a request to go to the Palais-Royal, to interview a famous media tycoon and potential candidate for President of France, Pierre Carchon. A mime hangs around outside Carchon's home, but Nico ignores him and goes on inside the house. She meets Carchon's wife, Imelda, as well as Carchon, who reveals that he knew Nico's father, Thierry Collard, very well. Soon, there is a noise in the drawing room; Carchon investigates only to be shot. Nico rushes to the scene to see the mime over Pierre's corpse. She is knocked to the ground before she can do anything and wakes up to find Imelda going to call the police.

After persuading her that she wants to find the truth and help, Imelda allows Nico to access Carchon's room, which contains an elephant carving –the same as one Nico received from her father, who had carved it himself, and a stone cylinder, which contained a hidden letter code. On Carchon's corpse, Nico discovers a ticket stamped "Bâteaux de la Conciergerie" and goes to investigate the dock where the Conciergerie was. By using the letters on the cylinder, she discovers a secret office area where Carchon and many others met for business. After she writes her story up, her editor Ronnie tells her to drop it, at which Nico becomes angry. However, she receives a mysterious phone call from a man called Plantard, who tells her he needs to speak to her about her story.

The next day, the American tourist George Stobbart witnesses an assassination at a cafe in Paris, during which a clown steals an old man's briefcase and detonates a bomb. Soon after, George meets Nicole who is photographing the scene. George investigates the area to help Nicole gather information about the attack. He finds the clown's discarded nose and learns that a man was seen escaping with a briefcase. After Nicole discovers the address of a costume shop inside the clown nose, George learns from that shop's owner that the nose had been purchased by a man named Khan.

George travels to the hotel where Khan is staying, where he obtains an ancient manuscript from Khan's hotel safe. After evading two hired thugs, Flap and Guido, George takes the manuscript to Nicole, who deduces that it is related to the Knights Templar. In a nearby museum, George finds a tripod that is illustrated in the manuscript. He soon travels to the excavation site in Lochmarne, Ireland where the tripod had been discovered; and, there, he obtains a gem identical to one on the manuscript. In a Templar chapel beneath the local castle ruins, George discovers a mural of a hanged man with "Montfauçon" written underneath.

Nico attempts to find out more about her father's involvement with Carchon. She deduces quickly that Imelda is in danger and rushes to the Palais Royale to save her. Nico is too late, but the dying Imelda gives Nico a key that fits a box Nico's father gave her. Nico opens the box and finds out the truth. Her father and Imelda were lovers, and her father worked for the government as a sort of spy against Carchon's secret organisation, meaning that Nico's father was "one of the good guys"; she decided to keep this a secret and not tell anyone, as did her father, out of respect for him. George returns to Paris and learns from Andre Lobineau, a colleague of Nicole's, that Montfauçon is a location in Paris. Flap and Guido attempt to steal the tripod from the museum; but they are beaten to the theft by Nicole, who gives the artifact to George. In the sewers of Montfauçon, George spies on a secret meeting of people who claim to be the Templars, and he learns of their plan to find the Sword of Baphomet. After the group leaves, George uses the tripod and gem in the underground chamber to reveal the name of a village in Syria: Marib. He travels to the village and discovers that Khan has been looking for him. At a nearby rock formation called the Bull's Head, George finds a lens and deduces that it is represented on the manuscript as a crystal ball. He also discovers an idol with three bearded faces, Baphomet; and a Latin inscription that describes Britain. Khan arrives and holds George at gunpoint, but George manages to escape.

Back in Paris, George learns from Andre that the manuscript mentions the Spanish De Vasconcellos family, who were once connected with the Templars. At the family's villa, George speaks to the family's sole surviving member, a Countess, who leads him to the De Vasconcellos mausoleum. There, George discovers the family's chalice, which the Countess entrusts to George. She asks him to find her missing ancestor, Don Carlos. In Paris, George uses the lens in the church at Montfauçon and discovers a hidden image of a burning man. In the church, George find Don Carlos' tomb, which is inscribed with a series of biblical references.

Andre reveals that an idol of Baphomet has been discovered in Paris, and George gains access to the excavation. Using the chalice, he discovers an image of a church with a square tower. George returns to the Countess, and he discovers that the biblical references show a secret area inside a well containing a chessboard mural with a river running through it. Compiling their clues, George, Nicole and Andre decide that the Templars are going to Bannockburn, Scotland. George and Nicole board a train, but she and an old woman in their compartment soon go missing. He reaches the conductor's carriage, where the old woman, Khan in disguise, throws Flap out of the carriage. However, Khan is shot and killed by the man who had killed Marquet. Before dying from his wounds, Khan, implicated to belong to the Hashshashin sect opposing these Neo-Templars (he does not accept them to be called Templars, as he says the real Templars were noble foes), and explains that he and George were on the same side. He also explains what the Sword of Baphomet is. The Sword symbolizes a colossal energy caused by the alignment of the earth's natural power fields which are focused at St. Ninian's church, where they are going. This energy endowed the Templars with the power which made them great and charismatic to such an extent they could control the will of all around them, giving them great power.

George and Nicole reach the church in time to see the Grand Master of the Templars acquire a power from two huge Baphomet idols—the Sword of Baphomet, or the Broken Sword. After trying to tempt George to join their ranks, the Grand Master orders the couple to be killed, but they escape with the aid of explosives. The church explodes, killing Guido, the Templars and—presumably—the Grand Master. The game ends with George and Nico on their last date on the Eiffel Tower.

== Development and marketing ==
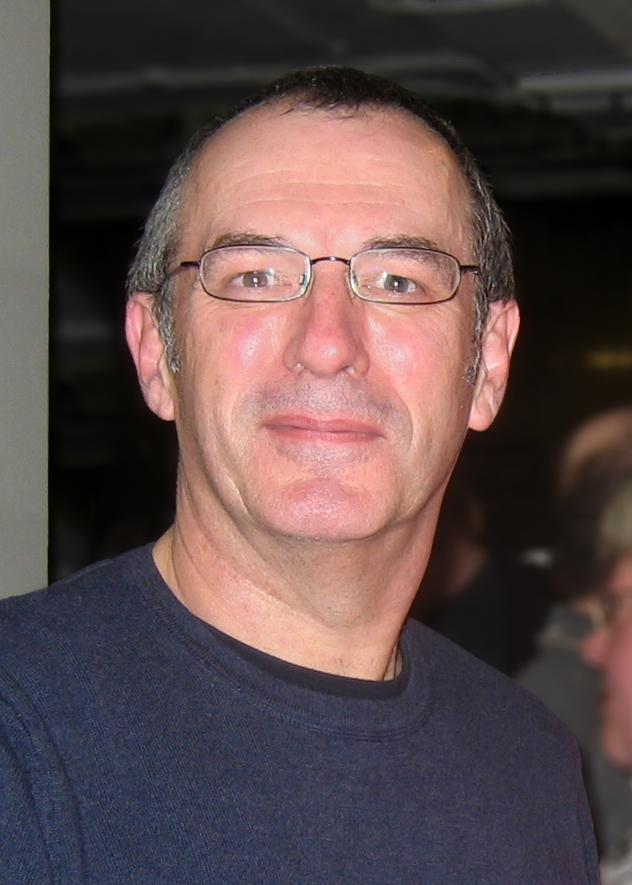
Dave Gibbons worked on the visual references for the game, and produced a comic book to accompany the game's Nintendo DS release.

On March 21, 2009, Ubisoft released a "director's cut" of The Shadow of the Templars for the Wii and Nintendo DS. According to Revolution's managing director, Charles Cecil, the Director's Cut came about thanks to a group of Broken Sword fans, who started an online petition begging him to bring the series to the Wii and DS. Rather than only porting the original game, as he did on the Game Boy Advance, Cecil thought it was time to reward fans with something new and different – hence the Director's Cut's additional material. The Game Boy Advance version was the basis for this version due to ease by which to build upon the Game Boy Advance version. The Game Boy Advance version had less content than the original version, and while this version was more faithful to the original, there were still some features absent due to the Nintendo DS' limitations.

Cecil decided the game would start a day before the Parisian cafe explosion in the original game, filling in some of Nicole Collard's back-story. To this end, Cecil also drafted in the acclaimed comic book artist Dave Gibbons, with whom Revolution worked previously on their 1994 cult classic adventure Beneath a Steel Sky. In addition to working on the visual references for the game, Gibbons also produced a comic book to accompany the game's DS release. Gibbons stated that he decided to return to video game work on this game because he knew producing character shots with a range of expressions would be challenging, and he knew he would enjoy it, based upon past experience.

The game was programmed by Tony Warriner and Joost Peters. In the Director's Cut, Hazel Ellerby returns to voice Nicole Collard in the new sections, playing Nico again for the first time since the original game's release. Rolf Saxon, as in every sequel, also returns to voice George Stobbart. Due to the platform's size limits, the DS version contains no spoken dialogue, only subtitles.

While bonus content not present in the original game was added to Director's Cut, the game did undergo censorship with respect to depictions of graphic violence. Some of the original game's dialogue and cutscenes were removed, with almost all blood edited out of retained cutscenes, save for a single scene showing a small bloody wound of a murder victim. All player death scenes and scenarios were also among the cutscenes censored out, consequently making it impossible to get a game over in this updated version.

Unlike in the original game, players control Nicole Collard for selected game sections. Besides the new character artwork by Gibbons during conversations, the Director's Cut also features a new first person view for certain puzzles. A version of the Director's Cut for iPhone and iPod Touch was released on January 20, 2010. Later in May, a version with higher resolution and a digital comic was released on the iPad. A PC version was released on August 27 on various digital distribution services. An Android version, which is an enhanced version of the iPhone version, was released on Google Play on June 28, 2012. The Nintendo versions of the Director's Cut were only released in physical retail formats.

The Broken Sword: Shadow of the Templars – The Director's Cut Original Soundtrack was released on the iTunes Store on December 28, 2009. With Director's Cut purchases on GOG.com, the consumer also receives the original game, original manual, high-definition wallpapers, the soundtrack, eleven avatars, and the comic book.

The comic book of the same name was created by Cecil and artist Dave Gibbons for the DS release of the Director's Cut in March 2009. The short comic provides a further glimpse back into Nico's past, showing readers what happened prior to the events of her playable segments in the game.

== Reception ==
Reception

Aggregate score
| Aggregator | Score |
|---|---|
| Metacritic | WII: 74/100; DS: 78/100 iOS: 91/100 |

Review scores
| Publication | Score |
|---|---|
| Official Nintendo Magazine | 86% |
| VideoGamer.com | 9/10 |
| Slide to Play | 4/4 |
| BeefJack | 8.9/10 |
| TouchArcade | iOS: 5/5 |

Awards
| Publication | Award |
|---|---|
| Pocket Gamer | Pocket Gamer Gold Award |
| European Games Awards | Best European Adventure |

Broken Sword: Shadow of the Templars – The Director's Cut was met with positive reception, particularly the iOS versions. According to Revolution managing director Charles Cecil, the game's sales were higher than those of the third and fourth games in the series, The Sleeping Dragon and The Angel of Death. In 2011, the Director's Cut and the rerelease of the sequel, The Smoking Mirror – Remastered, together sold around 500 thousand copies on iOS alone and had around five million downloads.

Official Nintendo Magazine UK praised the Wii version's puzzles, story, and art direction, and complimented the new hint system, finishing with: "One of the best point-and-click games ever, this will appeal to both newcomers and fans". Slide to Play also complimented the iPad version, saying it was "the version to get" for new players, and holding it up to support the iPad as "[truly] the ideal platform for adventure games". BeefJack praised the PC version's puzzles, story, characters, new content, and interface, but stated that audiovisual quality of older scenes is noticeably "ropey", that there are too many sliding tile puzzles, and that "the new jarring transition between old and new aesthetics lets it down".

=== Awards ===
Shadow of the Templars – The Director's Cut received several awards and nominations. It was nominated for Best Story at the 2009 British Academy Video Games Awards. Pocket Gamer awarded the iPhone version the Pocket Gamer Gold Award when it was released in 2010, and nominated it Best Adventure/RPG Game in 2011. The Wii and DS versions were nominated for Best Port/Updated Re-release at Adventure Gamers' 2010 Aggie Awards. The iPhone version was nPocket Gamer Awards. The Wii version won the award for Best European Adventure at the 2011 European Games Awards.

The Director's Cut edition is often listed as one of the greatest games on the iOS, Wii, and DS. GameYum listed it as one of "The Top 5 Nintendo DS Games" in 2009, and placed it first on its list of "The Top 5 iPhone Adventure Games" in 2011. In 2010, PCWorld listed it as one of the "25 Best iPad Games". Pocket Gamer listed it on its lists of "Top 10 point-and-click adventure games on iPhone and iPad" in 2010, and "Top 10 point-and-click adventures for iPad" (along with The Smoking Mirror – Remastered) and "Top 10 iOS games with Game Center" in 2011. Metacritic ranked it ninth on its list of "The Best iPhone and iPad Games of 2010". Trusted Reviews ranked it at number 31 on its "100 Best iPhone Games Ever" list in 2011. As of April 2012, it is VideoGamer.com's fifth-best-reviewed Wii adventure game and best reviewed DS adventure game of all time.
