= Tony Warriner =

British video game designer

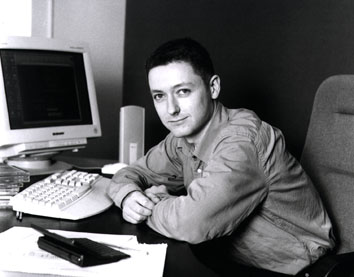
- Born: 19 October 1968 (age 58)
- Occupation: Video game designer
- Known for: Revolution Software
- Notable work: Broken Sword, Beneath a Steel Sky
- Website: http://tonywarriner.io/

Tony Warriner (born 19 October 1968, Malton) is a British video game designer, programmer and co-founder of Revolution Software. At a young age he started playing adventure games, when they were just text adventures. He wrote his first game, Obsidian, while he was at school and sent it to Artic Computing for consideration. Artic's director, Charles Cecil, loved the game and convinced him to license it to Artic, and then to join Artic as a programmer. At Artic he wrote, together with Adam Waring, Ultima Ratio which was published in 1987 by Firebird. In the same year he got a job at Cecil's Paragon Programming, where games from US publishers were converted to European platforms. When Cecil had left to work for U.S. Gold, Warriner started doing 8-bit programming for games. In 1988 he created Death Stalker, published by Codemasters. In the same year he joined Cascade Games, where he worked on 19 Part One: Boot Camp, Arcade Trivia Quiz, and Arcade Trivia Quiz Question Creator. In 1989 Warriner moved to Bytron Aviation Systems based in Kirmington, Lincolnshire, where he wrote software for the aviation industry, David Sykes was his fellow programmer.

In March 1990 Cecil, Sykes, Noirin Carmody and Warriner founded Revolution Software. For their first game he wrote an innovative engine, called Virtual Theatre, which enabled the gameworld to be more active and dynamic than was previously possible. The game's title became Lure of the Temptress and it was published in 1992. It was followed by a string of other critically and commercially successful adventure games, including Beneath a Steel Sky, the Broken Sword series, In Cold Blood and Gold and Glory: The Road to El Dorado. Beneath a Steel Sky and Broken Sword: The Shadow of the Templars are often both referred to as one of the best adventures of all time, appearing on numerous "top" adventure game lists and receiving several awards and nominations. Warriner (with others) received a nomination for Broken Sword: The Sleeping Dragon at the Game Developers Choice Awards in 2004 and for Broken Sword: Shadow of the Templars - The Director’s Cut at the British Academy Video Games Awards in 2010.

With Steve Ince he began to explore new ideas and in 2006 he founded 720games to publish their own gaming projects. In the same year he presented his game Blocster, a single player puzzle game. Besides his work on new editions of Beneath a Steel Sky and the first two Broken Sword Games (2009/2010), he worked on various games that weren't developed by Revolution, including A Christmas Carol and Sticky Blocks. In 2023 Warriner published a memoir of his career in the games industry to the present time, entitled - Revolution: The Quest For Game Development Greatness. His current project is an Action-adventure game game called, UrbX Warriors.

== Biography ==
=== Early career ===
In his youth Tony Warriner started playing adventures when they were just text adventures. Games like the original Unix Adventure, Zork and the Level 9 games were rich experiences for him and would inspire his future career. Still at school, he learned how to program and he started to write a game in assembly code. He succeeded to complete a game by himself, failed all his exams in the process, but he managed to get a job with the game.

That job was at Artic Computing, a company where Charles Cecil, upcoming co-founder of Revolution, had already been working for a couple of years during his studies. Warriner lived close to where Artic was based (Brandesburton, near Hull) and, about seventeen years old, he had sent in his game for consideration. In the game, Obsidian, the avatar moves around in a jet-pack to fix power terminals in a space station, while picking up items and avoiding the defenses of the station. Cecil, who considered it to be brilliant, convinced him to have it published by Artic. Warriner then came to work for Artic (1985). The cassette tape game was released for the Amstrad CPC in 1986. His next game, which he wrote together with Adam Waring, was Ultima Ratio, a vertical scrolling arcade shoot 'em up, set in space above the earth. Like Obsidian it exhibits colorful rooms that were typical for his early designs. Because Artic was already coming to an end, the game was finished for Telecomsoft and published in 1987 by Firebird.

In the same year he got a new job at Paragon Programming, started by Cecil, and at Paragon various games were converted to other platforms. When Cecil went to work for U.S. Gold, Warriner drifted around for some time, doing 8-bit games programming here and there. One of the games he created in this period was Death Stalker. The arcade adventure is set in a mystical world of ghouls, spells and wizards, in which the player must find the lost key of darkness and descend to the deeper dungeons. Death Stalker, with music by David Whittaker, was published by Codemasters in 1988.

In 1988 Warriner joined Cascade Games, where he worked on 19 Part One: Boot Camp (1988). Other games he worked on were Arcade Trivia Quiz and Arcade Trivia Quiz Question Creator, published by Zeppelin Games in 1989. In 1989 Warriner moved to Bytron where he wrote aviation software. David Sykes, who would become co-founder of Revolution, was his fellow programmer at Bytron, where they worked on a system to replace the strips of paper that were used in the towers at airports. The system was the first in the world to computerize those and, coming from the 8-bit gaming scene, they had no option but to encode their initials in the messages.

=== Revolution Software ===
Warriner didn't stay long at Bytron, as he was contacted by Cecil in 1989, who wanted to set up his own studio. Together with Sykes and Cecil's then-girlfriend Noirin Carmody they founded Revolution Software (March 1990). Warriner would stay a member (and co-owner) of the company till the present day. He would focus primarily on programming, but he also became involved in design, for which he is credited in various games.

In March 1990, in an office located in Hull, he began to work on what would become Revolution's first game, Lure of the Temptress (1992). Warriner designed an innovative engine for the game, called Virtual Theatre, which was in some respects more versatile than the game engines used by LucasArts and Sierra at that time. One of its new features was that it allowed the in-game characters, instead of being static NPCs, to wander around the game world independently of each other, living their own lives and doing their own thing. The game became, critically as well as commercially, one of the many successful games that would follow.

The next games he worked on were Beneath a Steel Sky (1994), Broken Sword: The Shadow of the Templars (1996) and Broken Sword II: The Smoking Mirror (1997). The typical Virtual Theatre features shown in Lure of the Temptress were scaled back in Beneath a Steel Sky, as they were hard to design for and more suitable to RPGs. New features were added to Steel Sky though, such as an object-oriented system, a new conversation system and a sophisticated, separate conversation editor. The cinematic Broken Sword games included more scripted events, cutscenes and parallax scrolling, as well as a new user interface and a conversation system with subject icons that didn't reveal what the main character was going to say. Though it was released only a year after the original game, Broken Sword II added more technical advances. The sequel included an Easter egg for the first time in Revolution's games, and a couple of years later Warriner revealed that the port of Broken Sword: The Shadow of the Templars to the Game Boy Advance would include – unlike the PC version - an Easter egg as well. The biggest change in the GBA version is the control interface that replaced the point-and-click method by direct control. The original games used a version of the Virtual Theatre engine, which was updated frequently.

He continued to work on all the games that would be published in the next decade. As In Cold Blood (2000) was the first one of the 3D games that would follow, he had to write new functionality to the game engine, and he worked on story design as well. In the same year Gold and Glory: The Road to El Dorado was published, a game that was based on the animated film, The Road to El Dorado. In this period he also worked on Good Cop Bad Cop, an action adventure for which a new in-house engine was developed, but the game, intended for the PS2, wasn't released. After these games the Broken Sword series was continued in real-time 3D with Broken Sword: The Sleeping Dragon (2003). Unlike some other companies, they had deliberately waited to bring Broken Sword to 3D until they felt that they got the quality they wanted. And the move to 3D was fairly difficult, as many technical issues had to be dealt with that would never surface in a 2D game. Besides for AI programming, Warriner was credited for story, game and section design. For Broken Sword: The Sleeping Dragon he received together with Cecil, Steve Ince and Neil Richards a nomination for Excellence in Writing at the Game Developers Choice Awards 2004. In 2006 the fourth episode of the series, Broken Sword: The Angel of Death, was released, for which Warriner was credited for additional design. The game allowed the player to choose between point-and-click and direct control.

In 2009 and 2010 he was credited for his work on Beneath a Steel Sky - Remastered, Broken Sword: Shadow of the Templars - The Director’s Cut, and Broken Sword: The Smoking Mirror - Remastered. He considered the iPhone version as the best one, as the interface brings the player closer to the game by touching the screen. The Directors Cut of Broken Sword: Shadow of the Templars includes another Easter egg, showing a room from Beneath a Steel Sky with one of its characters (the robot Joey) and the spaceman from Warriner's first game (Obsidian). For the game he received together with Cecil and Neil Richards a nomination in the category Story at the British Academy Video Games Awards in 2010.

After the Director's Cut version of Broken Sword, Warriner started working on a brand new engine, Virtual Theatre version 7, in order to deal with multiple platforms and screen resolutions. The engine is used in Revolution's fifth Broken Sword game, entitled Broken Sword: The Serpent's Curse, which was successfully funded in a Kickstarter campaign. The campaign updates included a video in which Warriner and Cecil talked about the game's characters and feedback. In October 2012 he set up a Tumblr blog, called Tony's Revolution Dev Blog.

In 2023 he wrote a book, Revolution: The Quest For Game Development Greatness that documented the formation and journey of Revolution Software. The book covered the first twenty five years of the company’s history. A second edition was subsequently published in 2025

=== Other projects ===
With Ince he began to explore new ideas and in 2006 he started 720games to publish their own gaming projects. In the same year he presented his game Blocster, a single player puzzle game.

Besides working on Revolution's games and Blocster, Warriner has also been working on various games that were (partially) developed by other companies. He worked on Disney's Story Studio: Disney's Mulan (Disney Interactive, Inc., Kids Revolution, 1999). He was also involved in A Christmas Carol (Nintendo DS, Sumo Digital, Ltd., 2009). With Jeff Rollason of AI Factory he created a new follow-up to its puzzle game Move it!. The game, entitled Sticky Blocks, was released in 2011.

=== Brazen Gameplay ===
In 2024 he formed a development partnership with renowned pixel artist, Stoo Cambridge. The pair vowed to combine their shared development history to produce a line of new original video games based on traditional arcade adventure gameplay and 2d pixel art. The first game, UrbX Warriors: The Lost City is due to be published in late 2026 for the Spectrum Next and PC after a successful Kickstarter in 2025. A subsequent 2026 Kickstarter successfully added Amiga and Sega MegaDrive to the line up.
