= Broken Sword 5: The Serpent's Curse =

2013 video game

- Developer: Revolution Software
- Publisher: Revolution Software
- Director: Charles Cecil
- Producer: Kelly Willoughby
- Designer: Nigel Kershaw
- Programmer: Joost Peters
- Artist: Tori Davis
- Writer: Neil Richards
- Composer: Barrington Pheloung
- Series: Broken Sword
- Engine: Virtual Theatre
- Platforms: Microsoft Windows, OS X, Linux, PlayStation Vita, Android, iOS, PlayStation 4, Xbox One, Nintendo Switch, tvOS
- Release: Episode 1: Microsoft Windows, OS X & Linux; WW: 4 December 2013 PlayStation Vita; PAL: 18 December 2013; NA: 6 May 2014 iOS; WW: 6 February 2014 Android; WW: 15 March 2014; Episode 2: Microsoft Windows, OS X & Linux; WW: 17 April 2014 PlayStation Vita; PAL: 28 May 2014; NA: 23 December 2014; Retail version: Microsoft Windows; EU: 20 June 2014 PlayStation 4 & Xbox One; WW: 4 September 2015 Nintendo Switch; WW: 21 September 2018
- Genre: Point-and-click adventure
- Mode: Single-player

Broken Sword 5: The Serpent's Curse is the fifth title in the Broken Sword series of adventure video games, developed and published by Revolution Software, for Microsoft Windows, OS X, Linux, PlayStation Vita (via the PlayStation Network), Xbox One, PlayStation 4, Nintendo Switch, Android and iOS. The game was released in two episodes: the first was made available on 4 December 2013; the second was released on 17 April 2014 for Microsoft Windows, OS X and Linux. The Serpent's Curse was announced on 23 August 2012, along with a Kickstarter project; it was launched for the development of the game, which had been self-funded until the launch, to be completed. The game is presented in HD and returns to the series' 2D roots, with 3D characters pre-rendered and saved in 2D frames. The majority of the funding for the game was raised through Kickstarter, more than $771,000 of the requested $400,000 were raised, and together with PayPal donations, over $823,000.

== Overview ==
=== Gameplay ===
Broken Sword: The Serpent's Curse is a 2D adventure game played from a third-person perspective. Via a point and click or touch user interface, the player guides protagonists George Stobbart and Nicole "Nico" Collard. One of the new gameplay elements explored is the manipulation and combining of knowledge, so the player has to connect threads of knowledge in order to draw logical conclusions, allowing them to proceed. While death scenes were removed from The Shadow of the Templars' director's cut (2009), in The Serpent's Curse, the player character's death is possible if the player makes a wrong decision or doesn't complete an action quickly enough; however, unlike in the original two Broken Sword games, where the player then started off from the last save point, they restart from right before the death scene, like in the 3D titles.

The player has the option to choose between the classic and modern inventory, the former being in the fashion of the first two games, and the latter in the fashion of their 2009 and 2010 remakes. The player also has the option of switching the hint system or hotspot highlights on or off.

== Plot ==
Several months after the events of Broken Sword: The Angel of Death, George Stobbart, now working as an insurance assessor, attends the opening of an exhibition in Paris by gallery owner Henri Dubois. Moments after reuniting with Nicole Collard, covering the exhibition, a pizza courier steals a painting called "La Maledicció", killing Henri as he leaves. Discovering the police detective handling the case, Inspector Auguste Navet, is incompetent, George decides to investigate the crime himself. He soon discovers that the theft was an inside job, and that Henri had security handled by a company belonging to Russian businessman Roman Medovsky. Meanwhile, Nicole is met by an elderly Spanish man named Tiago Marqués, who claims ownership of the stolen painting after reading about her story on the theft. In an interview with him, she learns the painting once belonged to Tiago's family until the Spanish Civil War, when his father, Xavier, died trying to stop its theft by fascists led by an unknown Swiss businessman.

Curious about his story, Nicole returns to the gallery to check Henri's paperwork, where she learns that the purported owner of La Maledicció is Medovsky. After she and George compare notes, they suspect Medovsky arranged the theft, after Tiago shows them a medallion and a family photo to prove his ownership of the painting. Travelling to his London home on the pretense of processing his insurance claim, they discover that Medovsky recently received a substanional offer for the painting by someone named Gehnen, that his driver Shears was the thief, and an art restorer named Wilfred Hobbs aided in the crime and had become intrigued about the painting's symbolism. Returning to Paris to attend a crime recreation by Navet, George speaks with a Dominican priest named Father Simeon, who was present during Henri's killing and who claims the stolen painting is evil. During their conversation, Simeon reveals the painting is linked to the Gnostics - a branch of Christianity persecuted in France by the Vatican Church in the 13th century - via a symbol of theirs on the canvas called the Ouroboros.

After being shown a sketch by George, which he took from Hobbs during their research into the painting, Simeon is deeply disturbed, claiming the painting is connected to something called the "Tabula Veritatis". Shortly after he leaves the recreation, George and Nicole meet Richard Langham, an Interpol agent investigating the theft, who warns them not to pursue Medovsky. Checking the painting's provenance in Henri's office, George discovers it was faked by Hobbs. Moments later, he discovers Simeon fatally shot in the gallery; after he dies, George finds a manuscript revealing the Tabula is deeply significant to the Gnostics. While evading the police, George learns from Nicole that Tiago has gone missing, following a fight in her neighbour's apartment where he was staying. Seeking answers, the pair confront Henri's widow Bijou regarding the forged provenance. Guilt-ridden, Bijou confesses that she, Hobbs and Henri agreed to help Medovsky - he intended to commit insurance fraud by staging the theft, while selling the painting to Gehnen. Bijou makes clear Hobbs retains the painting, but had become deeply worried after Henri's death.

Returning to London to confront Hobbs at his studio, the pair find him dead. Finding he made a copy of La Maledicció, which his killer stole, the pair discover the original, along with discovering he had located a Gnostic site at a castle in Catalonia, Spain. Moments after discovering this, the pair narrowly escape the studio after it catches fire, witnessing Langham leaving the scene. George suspects him to be involved with Gehnen, and that he killed Simeon and Hobbs because of the painting's secrets. Travelling to the castle in Catalonia, the pair reunite Tiago, who reveals it to be his family's former home. Working alongside him and his daughter Eva, George and Nicole examine the painting to decipher its secrets, finding clues that point to Montserrat, where the Gnostics hid the Tabula. Langham ambushes the group after tracking them down, kidnapping Tiago, while revealing that Gehnen was his grandfather - he led the raid on the Marqués' home, in order to find the Tabula and use it to raise Lucifer (the devil) by destroying Jehovah (God), seeking to free mankind; Tiago reveals it will cause chaos instead.

Aided by Eve, George and Nicole locate the artifact in a hidden Gnostic shrine, learning Gehnen died in his search for it, unaware Tiago's medallion was the key to retrieving it. Upon leaving the shrine, Langham steals the Tabula from them, fatally wounding Tiago and abducting Eve. Before he dies, Tiago reveals the Tabula can only by used at a site in Iraq denoted as "Eden". Attempting to pursue Langham, the group find themselves trapped by Medovsky, seeking to reclaim La Maledicció. Finding Shears suffering a crisis of conscience - where he confesses Henri's death was unintentional - Nicole convinces him to make his own choices. Shears kills Medovsky, before offering to help the pair pursue Langham. On the way to Iraq, George receives a cryptic message from Tiago in a dream, revealing that his medallion is the key to stopping Lucifer's arrival. Upon reaching the center of Eden, George reflects a beam of pure light with the medallion towards Langham during their ritual, killing him and collapsing Eden. With the world saved, George and Nicole hand the medallion and the Tabula to Eva, who vows to rebuild the Gnostic chapel in her family's home.

== Development ==
=== Origin ===
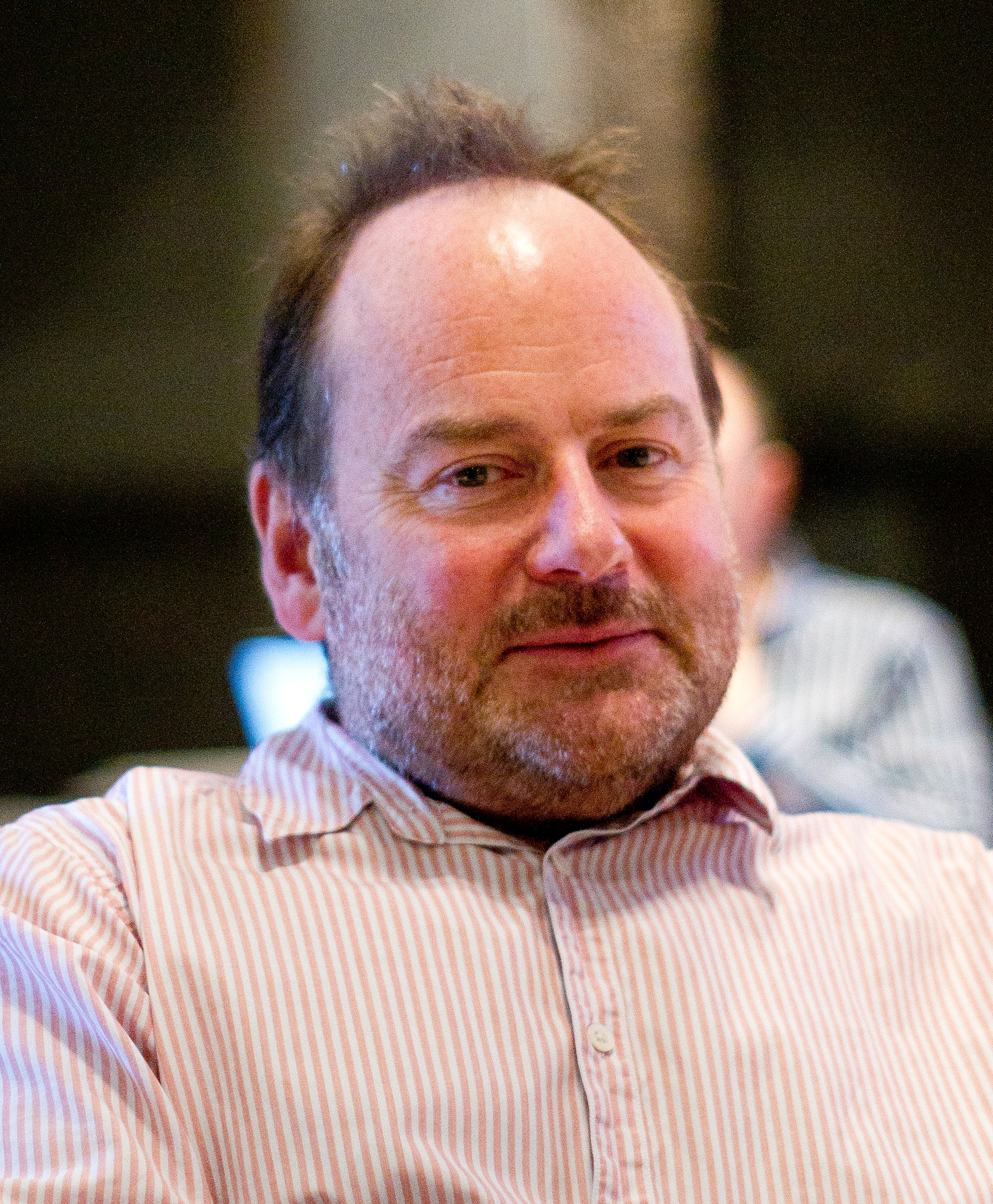
Revolution co-founder Charles Cecil, creator and director of the Broken Sword series

When writing the first two Broken Sword titles in the 1990s, Revolution Software's games were published by Virgin Interactive, who wanted to ensure that the games were of quality, putting Revolution under no pressure and giving them much creative freedom and little time restriction (more so with the first game, The Shadow of the Templars). Towards the end of the 1990s, however, adventure games, largely 2D and PC-exclusive, were declining in popularity during the rise of visceral, 3D platformers and were viewed as "commercially unfeasible". Cecil credited the decline to PlayStation, which introduced a new audience of University age interested in visceral, 3D games. As a result, publishers would rather pitch titles such as 3D shooters to retailers. This "drove away the audience that wanted more cerebral games like adventures, so sales for the genre dropped even further and it became a self-fulfilling prophecy", according to Charles Cecil, Revolution's CEO and Broken Sword creator.

This meant the Broken Sword sequels The Sleeping Dragon (2003) and The Angel of Death (2006) could be commissioned by publishers only by switching to 3D. When Revolution signed a contract, the publisher took control of the schedule, in which Revolution's creative process was limited by tight milestones that would compromise the game and guide the design to appeal to retailers rather than audiences. In this publishing model, the publisher took the financial risk, benefiting from the game's success, while the developer didn't – after the publisher and the retailers took their cuts of the revenue, a modest 7 percent was assigned to the developer; despite the Broken Sword series earning "hundreds of millions", Revolution was, to quote Cecil, "developing very successful games at a loss".

However, when Apple contacted Revolution in 2009 to produce their games for the iOS, Revolution self-published Broken Sword – The Shadow of the Templars: Director's Cut and Broken Sword – The Smoking Mirror: Remastered on the iPhone/iPad Store, and later on for PC and Mac on GoG.com, Steam and iTunes Store and for Android on Google Play; in the self-publishing model, Revolution was commissioned 70% of the revenue rather than 7%, meaning that the company was in a far stronger financial position than before. The commercial performance of the Broken Sword I and II reimaginations were also considerably stronger than the series' 3D entries, particularly on handheld platforms: the two remakes were purchased 500 thousand times, with downloads totaling five million through promotions, on the iOS in 2011 alone. Cecil credited Apple and digital distribution to saving indie developers such as Revolution, and reviving the adventure genre. This enabled the studio to partially self-fund their next title, The Serpent's Curse – 500 thousand dollars, earned with the success of the self-published releases, were spent on the game. Revolution then had to choose between making a shorter, more linear game with $500,000 with the length of the shortest Broken Sword, The Smoking Mirror, or try to raise money through crowd-funding to make an overall better game.

A few months before the announcement it was largely believed in the game press that Revolution was working on a fifth instalment in the Broken Sword series. Cecil didn't confirm the speculations though, but did confirm that they were working on a new high-definition title, which would return to Revolution's 2D roots which was planned to be announced in July 2012.

=== Announcement, fundraising and release ===
After a few delays, Revolution announced Broken Sword: The Serpent's Curse on 23 August 2012, starting a Kickstarter project with a $400,000 goal. Until then, the production of the game had been self-funded and $500,000 had been spent. Despite interest of the "industry's biggest third party publisher", Revolution preferred to self-publish the game, giving them creative freedom, which Cecil felt allowed them to make decisions that are best for the game. Cecil has also noted that he still plans to work with publishers in the future for retail releases. The game's Kickstarter goal was reached in the project's 13th day. It was successfully funded on 22 September, raising $771,560 from 14,032 backers, and a total of $823,232 counting 1,218 PayPal backers who raised $51,672.

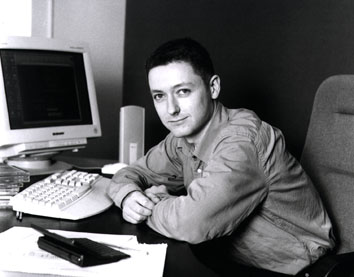
Revolution co-founder Tony Warriner, one of four Serpent's Curse programmers

The game has been released for Windows, Mac OS X, Linux, iOS, Android and PlayStation Vita, with a large possibility of a PlayStation Network and Xbox Live Marketplace release. Regarding Revolution's choice of platforms, Cecil said that the point-and-click interface of the PC platforms translated very well to the "slide-and-touch" user interface on mobile platform, but that the direct control interface on a console controller differs greatly from the former two interfaces. He noted though, that there he is still very keen to bring the game to consoles, but that it is not a certainty. Cecil has also noted that Revolution would have to publish the console versions through the format holders rather than self-publish. At the 2013 Gamescom, Revolution released a teaser trailer for The Serpent's Curse and announced a PlayStation Vita release.

Cecil stated that the game was expected to be released "in the first quarter, or right at the very beginning of the second quarter of next year [2013], so probably, end of March". In a GameSpot UK podcast, Cecil said that the game was expected to be delayed "for a month or two" because of the achieved stretch goals that increased the development time due to the promised additional content.

After further delays, Revolution announced on 5 November that the game will be released as a two-part episodic title, with the first episode coming on 4 December 2013, and the second one in Q1 2014. Initial releases would be for desktop platforms, and other releases would follow shortly after. Cecil explained that the game became much larger than they had anticipated, with enough content for two full-fledged games. This meant that the title would not be fully completed by the end of 2013, but Revolution had promised a 2013 release, and so came the decision to split the game in two. Cecil also added that sometimes games are too long, and players don't find time to finish it, and saw that a split would also benefit in this field. He compared the length of a single episode to that of The Smoking Mirror.

On 29 November, backers of the $50 tier or more were given exclusive beta access, featuring the first three scenes from episode 1. Both episodes bundled together were made available for pre-order, on 27 November 2013 on Good Old Games, and on 28 November on Steam. Episode one was released on 4 December for PC on the same services (episode 2 would be added to the game as an update for the same purchase). The first episode was also released for the Vita on 18 December, bought either separately or with the second episode, and for iOS on 6 February and on for Android on 18 March. On iOS and Android, episode 2 would be released as an in-app purchase.

=== Technical design ===
Broken Sword: The Serpent's Curse was built by four main programmers, using Virtual Theatre 7, Revolution's own in-house developed game engine based on the company's original Virtual Theatre, used to create their 2D titles in the 1990s. Tony Warriner, co-founder and technical director of Revolution, programmed the game's engine, in particular its user interface (UI) and game scripting system, wanting to warrant the UI was "as smooth, simple and intuitive as possible". As an engine developer, Joost Peters, who previously co-programmed the two Broken Sword remakes with Warriner, had to ensure the engine was portable and ran optimally on a wide range of platforms. Coder Peter Brooks had to implement features between various platforms and application programming interfaces connectable to the game. Andrew Boskett, who previously worked on The Sleeping Dragon, returned to program The Serpent's Curse. Warriner and Brooks both usually used OS X, Peters used Linux and Boskett Windows, to ensure that all the game would remain in sync on all platforms.

=== Creative design ===
==== Artistic direction ====
With The Serpent's Curse, Broken Sword returned to its 2D roots, in high-definition (HD). While the latter two Broken Sword entries had been generally well received by the series' fanbase, the move to 3D graphics was met with mixed reactions. The backgrounds for The Serpent's Curse were originally planned to be pre-rendered 3D ones, but Cecil felt they "just didn't give [the crew] the look that [they] wanted". He also believed that while 3D was accurate and realistic, it "lacked character" and the "classic" feel of the "clarity and beauty" of backgrounds hand-drawn by skillful 2D layout artists that Cecil felt could "cheat perspective to achieve maximum emotional effect while remaining believable" and "create environments that are more interesting and it creates a much better overall feeling".

Revolution sourced experienced layout artists that have worked for companies such as Disney, DreamWorks, Nickelodeon, Universal Studios, Aardman, Sony Pictures Entertainment and 20th Century Fox, including lead art director Tori "Cat" Davis, who has worked on acclaimed works such as animated films The Illusionist (2010), Arthur Christmas (2011) and Frankenweenie (2012), as well as the children's animated television series Shaun the Sheep (2007–); she created and managed the hand drawn environments for the game and oversee the work of the background painters. Craig Gardiner, the game's lead animator, oversaw the work of the animation team, to ensure the character animations were consistent and did not feel out of place, fitting within Cecil's vision of the game. Tim Robins was the graphic artist; he created text information seen on the screen, such as icons, menus and maps, was responsible for the visual style of interactive elements in the game and also served as an assistant layout artist. Backgrounds were traditionally hand-drawn and then colored in Photoshop, while Robins usually worked in Photoshop and Illustrator.

While the return to 2D had been met with high praise, the characters were modeled in 3D and then pre-rendered and saved in 2D sprites rather than being hand-drawn 2D sprites, which was initially met with mixed reception from fans. Cecil explained that the game was in full HD in order achieve the highest visual quality possible, but the original animations from The Shadow of the Templars and The Smoking Mirror were created in 640×400; a move to HD would require animations three times larger, and hand-animating so many pixels might be possible, but would be a "massively complicated job". To further quote Cecil: "The massive advantage of rendering and then modelling is that obviously the data is much more manageable, we can connect animations much more smoothly, we can continue to tweak to optimise the 2D look which we're in the process of doing, and you can hand-touch them at the end. A lot of people have said that we should be doing 2D, and I totally respect their comments, but my opinion is that it's just not feasible. I'm also very pleased with the way the sprites are looking anyway. What we probably need to do is communicate that the end result is they look like they're sprites, they look like they're 2D. So I don't regret the decision at all, and I'm absolutely convinced it's the right one. I just don't think we've communicated as well as we should have done that the end results will look like cartoony 2D sprites". He also stated that 2D and 3D in HD brings the "best of every world". Technology written specifically to give the sprites a more "cartoony" look was written.

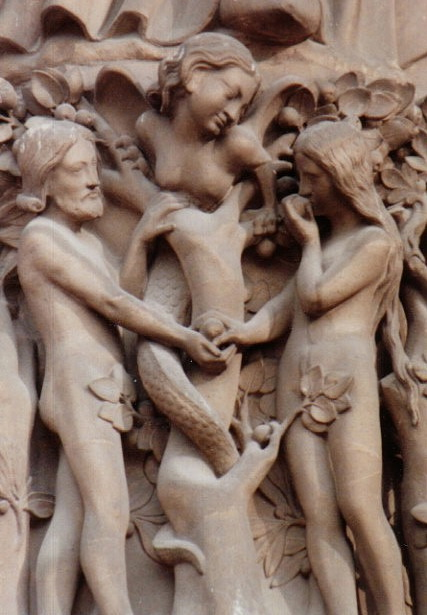
The game's storyline is based on the Gnostic Gospels' depiction of the Serpent as Lucifer, the bringer of light

==== Historical background ====
Dan Brown's best-selling The Da Vinci Code (2003) brought the Knights Templar theme into the mainstream, despite negative reviews, inspiring a slew of often panned Templar films, games and books, and as a result, the Templars became cliche; although Broken Sword: The Shadow of the Templars was released seven years prior to The Da Vinci Code to great acclaim as part of the Templar "zeitgeist", bringing them into the public eye, with the game's fanbase and various media outlets even believing that Brown was inspired by Broken Sword when writing his novel, Cecil felt that the Broken Sword series could no longer trade on the Templar, a theme three of the four Broken Sword games were based on.

Cecil had since been fascinated by the Gnostic Gospels; in 1945, a local farmer near Nag Hammadi, Upper Egypt discovered a clay casket with twelve leather-bound manuscripts that comprised fifty-two Gnostic texts; one of the texts particularly caught Cecil's attention, the Testimony of Truth, which tells the story of Genesis from a different perspective: From the perspective of a jealous God, the creator of man, and the Serpent, Lucifer, the bringer of light, who gives knowledge to man but is not once called the Devil – these were written by Gnostics, who were considered heretic by the Orthodox Church; the Cathars, who were Gnostic, were brutally suppressed and massacred during the 13th century in the Albigensian Crusade in Languedoc, Southern France, by Pope Innocent III of the Catholic Church and the newly-set up Dominican Order.

Cecil was fascinated that a piece of Christian history with such importance hadn't yet been brought into public consciousness, and hoped to start the new zeitgeist with The Serpent's Curse, which would explore what secrets the Gnostics held and why did the Church feel threatened by them, resonating the story to the present day.

==== Audio ====
The game was dubbed into German, French, Spanish, and Italian. Polish and Russian translations of the subtitles were made available as well. Rolf Saxon returned to voice George Stobbart. Emma Tate voiced Nicole "Nico" Collard. Other voice actors from earlier instalments of the series will also return. Alexander Schottky, the original German voice of George, Emmanuel Curtil, the original French voice of George, and Nathanièle Esther, the French voice of Nico, are also confirmed to reprise their roles. Hazel Ellerby, who voiced Nicole "Nico" Collard in the original Broken Sword: The Shadow of the Templars and its director's cut, was initially set to reprise her roles of Nico and Lady Piermont, but scheduling conflicts came in the way and Ellerby was not included in the recording. The voice recording took place in OMUK, a video game voice recording studio in London. The Shadow of the Templars and director's cut composer Barrington Pheloung returned as well. The soundtrack will be synthesized rather than orchestrated. It also featured songs by Miles Gilderdale, including "Jasmine" and "Strange Girl".

=== Kickstarter expansion and other additions ===
The Serpent's Curse, without achieving its Kickstarter goal, would be a more linear game, quicker to play through, circa eight-hours long, of similar length to the shortest Broken Sword, The Smoking Mirror. The funds raised and stretch goals achieved enabled Revolution to make a longer, more ambitious game with further external locations with associated puzzles and characters to ensure the game doesn't feel "claustrophobic", as well additional characters making the game more free-form and giving players a genuine choice in how they choose to approach puzzles. In the game, the player is also offered the option to choose the preferred of two text fonts: one resembling the stylised, colored and bold font of the early series' entries, and one resembling the boxed comic-book font found in the Broken Sword remakes.

== Reception ==
=== Episode 1 ===
Reception

Aggregate scores
Aggregator	Score
GameRankings	74%
Metacritic	(PC) 69/100 (PSV) 67/100

Review scores
Publication	Score
Edge	6/10
GameSpot	8/10
Metro (UK)	6/10
Hardcore Gamer	4/5
Digital Spy	3/5
Hooked Gamers	8.5/10
IncGamers	6/10
USgamer	4/5

The first episode was met with mixed reviews from critics. Reviewers gave much praise to the episode for its artistic direction and plot, many deeming it a return to form for the series, while a number of them felt that it was too linear and easy and that the split into episodes resulted in an unpleasant cliffhanger. It received a score of 74% on GameRankings and 69/100 on Metacritic.

The return of hand-drawn 2D backgrounds was met with high praise from reviewers. Edge stated that Revolution "have maintained the peerless quality" of its "gorgeous", "beautifully" "hand-drawn backgrounds" provided by "top tier film industry talent". Geoff Thew of Hardcore Gamer hailed Revolution as "adventure game masters" for crafting "capital-G Gorgeous" backgrounds, "hand-drawn with a true sense of artistry and packed with detail" that feel "lived-in, while simultaneously allowing important gameplay elements to be subtly emphasized".

However, the inclusion of cel-shaded 3D character models was met with mixed reactions. While it was generally agreed that the models do look good, many were critical of their "wooden" animations. Cameron Woolsey of GameSpot said the 3D character models "blend effortlessly into the gorgeous" backdrops, but was critical of the "distracting", "stiff and somewhat primitive animations". Edge felt that the "strange, plastic-looking" 3D character models and their "awkward, robotic animations" are a ""jarring" that looks "entirely out of place". Both Snædal and Thew viewed this as a minor issue, and others were far less critical of the animations, particularly Osborn, who was "really impressed" with the "much-improved animations and sly 2.5D effects" and the "fluid and effortless" character movements. Pete Davison of USgamer said that the "gorgeous", "high-res" backgrounds coupled with the "high[ly] detail[ed]" 3D models make for a "good-looking game", despite "some animations [being] a little wooden at times". Mark Langshaw of Digital Spy complimented the inclusion of 3D models set against 2D backgrounds, which he said that "despite looking dated in some respects", felt "like a natural evolution" for Broken Sword.

Some were positive about the puzzles: Thew said that "plenty" are "well-designed" and "feel sensible while still taxing your mental muscles". David and Woosley noted that the puzzles were generally easy with clear solutions, but agreed that the game's linearity helped the narrative move on with a strong and steady pace. Others found the quality of the puzzles to be variable: Both Edge and Metro GameCentral felt that they vary from "excellent", "well thought-out logic-based puzzles" to "absurdly abstract or purely dialogue-based". Langshaw stated that some are "genuinely inventive", while others "feel tedious and unsatisfactory to the seasoned adventurer". McDonald said that "few are particularly difficult, and there aren't too many that feel illogical or ridiculous, but there is a big reliance on the game giving you the item you need at the exact moment you need it".

The plot was met with praise. Davison complimented the "slow, careful and considered pacing". Woolsey said that "the story weaves a smart, fascinating, and often humorous tale". Snædal hailed the "brilliant story evolution and plot complexity". Edge called the story "an intriguing, often spooky, yarn" that "achieves that crucial, careful balance between character motivation and circumstance driving events forward". Langshaw praised the story, "laden with mystery and intrigue", but noted "some pacing issues". McDonald, Osborn and Metro GameCentral all complimented the "dark", "engaging" and "intriguing" plot.

Many accredited the script and voice acting. Woolsey stated that the game's world is complemented by "interesting, entertaining, and often hilarious" characters whose personalities "shine through every conversation" and a "great vocal cast" that "makes each character believable and memorable". Thew said the characters are well-written and showcase "some great" humor through "extensive and amusing dialogue trees", and like previous Broken Swords, "some of the industry's best voiceover work". McDonald noted that the mixture of a dark story with "ridiculous" characters with "over-the-top accents" was part of "Broken Sword's charm", which he liked, but added that it was a matter of "personal taste". He stated that a majority of the characters are "well-written" with "memorable individuality", writing: "For once I can actually use the word 'character' without inwardly rolling my eyes". He pointed out Bassam and Rolf Saxon's performance as George Stobbart as highlights. Others were less enthusiastic. Langshaw and Metro GameCentral agreed that, while "by no means poor", the script fell victim to "attempts at humour" that "fall embarrassingly flat", and that the voice cast was "highly variable", namely approving Rolf Saxon's return as George but denouncing Emma Tate as Nico. Even Snædal who commended the "quality" voiceovers, showed disapproval of Tate's overacting. Some reviewers applauded the music. McDonald said "the sound design is gorgeous and reminiscent of earlier games". Thew said the games's "powerful and cinematic" score "evoke[s] nostalgia" and that there is "some fantastic ambiance at play here that really brings the environments to life".

Many of the critics' final scores were affected by the cliffhanger, which most found unsatisfactory, while others left the game unrated until the second episode. Davison wrote that the game is a "fine return to form for the series" that "very much feels like one of the first two Broken Sword games", but "frustratingly" "ends with a cliffhanger just as things are starting to get really interesting in this regard". Although finding it a "natural break" and saying that "what's here is very good indeed and absolutely well worth your time", he noted that buying the separate episode before the full release depends on "your own tolerance to cliffhangers". Thew was upset with how the game ends with an "egregious cliffhanger" without a "sense of resolution". He still said that "even if it hasn't been entirely satisfying", it is a "thoroughly enjoy[able]" game that "has been a lot of fun so far". He closed stating that people unfamiliar with the game being wary because of it being "half-finished", he wouldn't hesitate to recommend the game to fans and hoped and believed that Revolution would deliver a "fulfilling conclusion" and "great finale". Edge wrote that the game "offers much of the same charismatic virtual tourism and intrigue that has held the brand in such high regard for so long" and "certainly take[s] and recreate[s] some of the best elements of their previous adventures", but feared that it did not offer enough innovation to "drag players away from" newer point-and-click offerings and hoped that the second episode would "offer a narrative curveball to shock the series into a new era rather than simply riffing on its past". McDonald felt like the game was "one big title that's been chopped in half" which closes just as "the big mystery is really only beginning to kick off" and doesn't feel "normally self-contained", making it difficult to score the game, as the quality of it "hinges so badly on the quality of the second episode"; this made him wary of recommending it "too highly" to someone who is not familiar with the series until the second episode's release and finished off writing: "I hope that, when episode two launches, I'll be bemoaning my own idiocy and falling over myself to award the complete game a much higher score [than 6/10]". Osborn deemed the first episode of The Serpent's Curse "immensely entertaining so far" and "one of 2013's unexpected pleasures".

=== Episode 2 ===
Reception

Aggregate scores
Aggregator	Score
GameRankings	74%
Metacritic	72/100

Review scores
Publication	Score
GameSpot	6/10
Hardcore Gamer	4/5
IncGamers	8/10

The second episode saw an improvement in reception, particularly the increased pace and puzzle difficulty, although some did see certain elements worsen. Hamza Ansari of Adventure Classic Gaming points out "the dialogs and the puzzles exponentially become complex and mind grinding as the game continues. Several of the puzzles involve cryptic but logical use of cipher codes for you to decipher hidden messages. The game also assumes that you have substantive familiarity and knowledge of the Gnostic Gospels and are able to identify obscure references in paintings to these ancient texts".

It received a score of 74% on GameRankings and 72/100 on Metacritic.
