= So Blonde: Back to the Island =

2010 video game

- Developer: Wizarbox
- Publisher: dtp Entertainment
- Director: Julien Millet
- Designers: Jérôme Britneff-Bondy; Steve Ince
- Programmer: Benoist Malherbe
- Artist: Natalia Renault
- Writer: Steve Ince
- Engine: OGRE
- Platforms: Wii, Nintendo DS
- Release: GER: March 26, 2010; FRA: May 14, 2010
- Genre: Adventure
- Mode: Single-player

So Blonde: Back to the Island is a point-and-click adventure game released for the Wii and Nintendo DS in 2010. It is not a sequel or spin-off, but a darker "what if?" scenario based on the 2008 PC game So Blonde, which also precedes Captain Morgane and the Golden Turtle, which was released in 2012.

== Plot ==
Sunny Blonde is a 17-year-old who has been spoiled by her rich parents. On a cruise with her parents who are celebrating their wedding anniversary, the ship is struck by lightning, and she is knocked overboard.

She finds herself stranded on a beach of a remote “Forgotten Island” in the Caribbean Sea. The dark side of the island, that is, where the pirates under command of Captain One-Eye have their hideout.

== Development ==
So Blonde: Back to the Island was announced to be in development on August 23, 2008, a few months after the release of So Blonde. The game was explained to be a "What If..." scenario to find a balance between making So Blonde available to consoles while keeping it interesting for old fans at the same time. Because it follows the original story in broad strokes, So Blonde: Back to the Island reuses models, backgrounds, and art from the original game where applicable.

Voice recording was arranged by MAS Productions and took place in a two-week time span around October 2, 2009. The trailer of the game debuted at Gamescom in 2010.

== Reception ==
Reception

Review scores
Publication	Score
Adventure Gamers	3 of 5
Gamekult	3 of 10
Jeuxvideo.com	14 out of 20 (Wii); 13 out of 20 (NDS)
Adventure-Treff	74 of 100 (Wii); 69 of 100 (NDS)

Being of a niche genre and only having an EU release there are very few reviews online. Almost all reviews of So Blonde: Back to the Island rate the game low-favorably, with the Wii version scoring mildly higher than the Nintendo DS version. The common opinion is that So Blonde: Back to the Island does well what it does, but all the same does nothing new.
