= Gray Matter (video game) =

2010 video game

- The cover artwork depicts the main characters Samantha Everett in the center and David Styles in the upper left.
- Developers: Wizarbox; Spiders (Xbox 360)
- Publisher: DTP Entertainment
- Designers: Jane Jensen; Dinga Bakaba
- Artists: Frédéric Augis; Natalia Renault
- Writer: Jane Jensen
- Composer: Robert Holmes
- Platforms: Windows, Xbox 360
- Release: GER: 12 November 2010; FRA: 2 December 2010; NA: 22 February 2011 (PC); EU: 25 February 2011
- Genre: Point-and-click adventure
- Mode: Single-player

Gray Matter is a point-and-click adventure game designed by Jane Jensen, creator of the Sierra Entertainment Gabriel Knight series. The game was developed by Wizarbox and published by DTP Entertainment for Microsoft Windows and Xbox 360. It was released in November 2010 in Continental Europe and in English-speaking territories in 2011.

The game takes place in Oxford and, to a lesser extent, in London. It follows the story of Samantha Everett, a street performer and magician, and Professor David Styles, an acclaimed and mysterious neurobiologist.

== Gameplay ==
The game features many real world locations. Photo of Carfax Tower (upper) compared to the in-game representation (lower).

The PC version of the game is played entirely with the mouse (point-and-click). The cursor is contextual, meaning that it will change automatically to actions such as "Talk to...", "Pick up...", and so on, depending on the object it is hovering over at the time. Item labels may be toggled at any time.

The game is divided into eight chapters, giving it a similar structure to The Beast Within; the other Gabriel Knight games were divided into "days". The player controls Dr. David Styles in chapters 3, 5 and 7, and Samantha Everett in the rest. Each chapter requires completion of certain objectives. Bonus objectives are also available for every chapter but are not required to advance the main story.

Puzzles include riddles, word games, visual puzzles, mazes, and magic tricks. As an aspiring magician, Sam often adapts tricks out of her magician's handbook to the situation at hand. The tricks vary from creating misdirection to using gimmicks or taking or planting objects through sleight of hand. If each required step is not performed correctly, the player has the opportunity to redo the trick from the last correct step.

== Plot ==
The opening scene of the game depicts Sam riding her motorcycle in the rain in the countryside while traveling to London, and accidentally being redirected to Oxford because of a broken street sign. Her bike breaks down, forcing her to take shelter in Dread Hill, a nearby mansion where David resides. She poses as an Oxford student responding to Styles' request for a research assistant.

Eventually, Sam is ordered to recruit six students as test subjects for David's research. Through clever manipulation and magic tricks, Sam manages to find four students willing to volunteer for the experiment. The professor recalls her to Dread Hill, letting her know that he found a fifth candidate and making Sam herself the sixth.

As the game progresses, Sam learns about the professor's past, his research on the paranormal, the prestigious members-only Daedalus magic club, a series of bizarre events that take place at Oxford University, and how these elements are connected.

== Development and release ==
Gray Matter was originally announced in 2003 as Project Jane-J and slated for release in 2004. The game was put on hold in 2004 and later revived by a German publisher Anaconda in 2006 for release in 2007 and then 2008. In 2008, development was moved from Hungarian Tonuzaba to French Wizarbox, delaying the game further. The game was released in Germany on 12 November 2010 and in Spain on 19 November, and was released in North America and Europe in February 2011 and in Australia in March.

A Wii version of the game was tentatively planned but never produced.

The collector's edition includes a metal game box, a CD with the game soundtrack (score and songs by Robert Holmes), a deck with Gray Matter playing cards, 5 exclusive postcards with artwork from the game, and a double-sided poster. This edition is available only in German.

== Reception ==
Reception

Aggregate scores
Aggregator	Score	
Aggregator	PC	Xbox 360
GameRankings	74%	66%
Metacritic	72/100	N/A

Review scores
Publication	Score	
Publication	PC	Xbox 360
Adventure Gamers	3.5/5	N/A
The A.V. Club	A−	N/A
Edge	5/10	N/A
Eurogamer	N/A	6/10
GameSpot	7/10	6.5/10
GameZone	8/10	N/A
IGN	7.5/10	N/A
Jeuxvideo.com	17/20	17/20
Official Xbox Magazine (UK)	N/A	4/10
PC Gamer (UK)	74%	N/A
RPGFan	90%	N/A
The Telegraph	4/10	4/10
Metro	5/10	N/A

The PC version received "mixed or average reviews" according to the review aggregation website Metacritic. Adventure Classic Gaming said of the same PC version, "For the rest of gamers who opt to evaluate this game on its own merits, Gray Matter is a game that can easily measure up against the best of what the genre can offer. Gray Matter succeeds not because of its pedigree but because of what it can deliver." Most of the criticisms of the game are directed at the quality of the cutscenes, which are considered out of keeping with the quality of the rendered graphics. Official Xbox Magazine UK gave the Xbox 360 version an unfavorable review, criticising the clunky interference and "patronising" depiction of England. The A.V. Club praised the puzzles and writing of the PC version and called it "the best traditional adventure game in a decade".
