= So Blonde =

2008 video game

- Developer: Wizarbox
- Publishers: EU: Anaconda; UK: Eidos Interactive
- Director: Julien Millet
- Designer: Jérôme Britneff-Bondy
- Programmer: Olivier Martin
- Artist: Natalia Renault
- Writer: Steve Ince
- Engine: OGRE
- Platform: Windows
- Release: EU: March 14, 2008; FRA: June 13, 2008; UK: September 26, 2008
- Genre: Adventure
- Mode: Single-player

So Blonde, subtitled Lost in the Caribbean in Spanish and Blonde in Trouble in Russian and Polish, is a point-and-click adventure game released for Windows in 2008. Two spin-off games have been released: So Blonde: Back to the Island in 2010 and Captain Morgane and the Golden Turtle in 2012.

== Plot ==
Sunny Blonde is a 17-year-old who has been spoiled by her rich parents. On a cruise with her parents who are celebrating their wedding anniversary, the ship is struck by lightning, and she is knocked overboard.

She finds herself stranded on a beach of a remote “Forgotten Island” in the Caribbean Sea. She is totally alone and worrying about her nails and messy make-up. To her surprise, her cell phone doesn't work anymore, and when she approaches a lonely boy sitting on a rock, she learns that he can't point her to the nearest hotel or fully furnished mall. On the island, time seems to have stopped about two hundred years ago. When she starts to explore the island, she finds out that it is ruled by pirates and that it seems to be cursed as well.

In this setting, Sunny has to get rid of her spoiled manners and, in time, she will discover what her real nature is. Everyone on the island, inhabitants, pirates and authorities, seem to have a secret agenda, and Sunny must learn to function on her own, because it will become her task to set things right on the island and to find a way back home.

== Development and release ==
So Blonde was announced to the public on March 2, 2007 and had taken 14 months of development by the time of release. The game makes use of the OGRE engine. The game was released in Germany, Austria, and Switzerland on March 14, 2008 by DTP Entertainment under the "Anaconda" publishing label. It was then released three months later in France on June 13. Eidos Interactive released the game in the United Kingdom on September 26, 2008.

== Reception ==
Shortly before the release of So Blonde, the script writer of the game, Steve Ince, was nominated for the Writers' Guild of Great Britain 2008 Awards. His script for the PC Adventure game So Blonde was shortlisted in the category "Best Video game Script".

So Blonde garnered generally mixed reviews, and holds an average of 73% on review aggregator site GameRankings.

== See also ==
- A Vampyre Story
- Runaway 2: The Dream of the Turtle
