= Wizarbox =

French video game developer

- Industry: Video games
- Founded: 2003
- Defunct: 2012
- Headquarters: Sèvres, France
- Products: Graphic adventure games
- Website: www.wizarbox.com

Wizarbox was a video game developer based in Sèvres, France, southwest of Paris. They are notable for their graphic adventure games developed by industry veterans, such as the So Blonde series by Steve Ince (lead designer of Broken Sword: The Sleeping Dragon) and Gray Matter by Jane Jensen (lead designer of the Gabriel Knight series). The company declared bankruptcy in December 2012 and was placed in receivership by a French court. Interaction-Games later acquired Wizarbox.

== Background ==
Wizarbox had been porting video games by other companies to consoles since 2002's Arx Fatalis. In 2007, they released their first in-house developed video game, So Blonde, written and designed by industry veteran Steve Ince. The success of So Blonde led to the development of So Blonde: Back to the Island, an alternate reality scenario set during the events of the original game, and the spin-off Captain Morgane and the Golden Turtle. After the troubled development of Gray Matter by Jane Jensen, they took over development of the title and released it in 2010.

== Recognition ==
So Blonde was nominated for "best video game script" at the 2008 Writers' Guild of Great Britain Awards.

== Games ==
- 2003 CT Special Forces: Back to Hell (PlayStation port)
- 2003 Arx Fatalis (Xbox port)
- 2003 Football Generation (PlayStation 2 (2006) and PlayStation 3 (2012) ports of Windows version)
- 2006 Panzer Elite Action: Fields of Glory (PlayStation 2 port)
- 2006 Azur and Asmar
- 2007 Scrabble 2007 Edition
- 2008 So Blonde
- 2009 Imagine: Family Doctor
- 2009 Risen (Xbox 360 port)
- 2009 Venetica (Xbox 360 port)
- 2010 So Blonde: Back to the Island
- 2010 Gray Matter
- 2012 Captain Morgane and the Golden Turtle
- 2012 Risen 2: Dark Waters (Xbox 360 and PlayStation 3 ports)
- 2012 R.A.W: Realms of Ancient War
