= Obsidian (1986 video game) =

1986 video game

- Artic Computing advert with Obsidian artwork as the main image
- Developer: Tony Warriner
- Publisher: Artic Computing
- Platform: Amstrad CPC
- Release: EU: 1986
- Genre: Action-adventure
- Mode: Single-player

Obsidian is an action-adventure computer game for the Amstrad CPC personal computer published by Artic Computing in 1986. The game is set on the titular space station located within the centre of an asteroid, which is out of control and drifting towards a black hole. The player must guide an astronaut with a jet pack around the station and re-activate its engine shields to prevent the Obsidian's destruction. This involves collecting items and using them to solve puzzles, while avoiding the Obsidian's reactivated security systems.

Obsidian is the first game that was developed by Revolution Software co-founder Tony Warriner, who was a school pupil at the time. Due to concentrating on Obsidian's development rather than revising he failed all of his exams. The game received a positive response from journalists: it was praised for the quality of its graphics, though reviewers held mixed views on the game's ability to maintain player interest. The jet pack was criticized for being too sensitive when responding to the player's movement inputs.

== Gameplay ==
Obsidian is an action-adventure presented in two dimensions, spread across approximately 50 game screens. Locations contrast between spaceship interior and rock surfaces. Players control a jet pack wearing astronaut who must deactivate the five engines of the titular spacestation Obsidian, which is located in the hollow centre carved out of an asteroid. Objects are stored in gravity boxes on the station's ceilings, only one object can be held at a time. These are used to solve the game's puzzles and allow the player to continue further into the game. Each object's purpose must be discovered as they are not labelled.

The game world is filled with traps, laser defence mechanisms and security robots, all of which kill the astronaut on contact, resulting in the loss of one of his five lives. These defences must be shut down with objects obtained from gravity boxes in order to progress, as the player has no weapon to directly attack the robots with. The jet pack enables the astronaut to travel more quickly, but has a limited supply of nitro fuel. Should this fuel run out then the astronaut will lose a life. The spaceship contains points at which the jet pack can be refuelled, though these can be difficult to locate.

== Plot ==
The crew of the Obsidian have temporarily abandoned the vessel in order to allow it to pass through a black hole. The Obsidian's internal systems are capable of withstanding the black hole, but the station cannot shield its human inhabitants from the gravitational forces. The crew have taken refuge in a smaller craft which has been shielded, intending to return to the Obsidian when both vessels have passed through the black hole. A radiation storm has damaged the Obsidian's engine protection systems and erased its flight path, leaving the station drifting towards the black hole where it will be destroyed. Only one member of the crew has the skills necessary to return to the Obsidian and prepare it to pass through the black hole, this is the game's player character. The astronaut is forced to contend with the Obsidian's re-activated security system which has resulted in security robots being deployed, the space station's internal doors sealing and defensive laser grids becoming active. Once the player has restored power, reactivated the Obsidian's engines and reset the station's flight path, there is a limited time to teleport back to the smaller shielded craft before the Obsidian's engines carry the astronaut through the black hole without being shielded.

== Development ==
Obsidian is the first game developed by Tony Warriner, one of four founders of the adventure game developer Revolution Software. Warriner was introduced to home computers at the age of 13, as a result of which he developed an interest in game development. This interest resulted in him creating Obsidian when he should have been studying for his school exams, resulting in him failing every exam. The game was published, however, resulting in the young developer's entry into the video game industry. Revolution Software was formed 4 years later.

== Reception ==
The reviewer for Amtix! magazine awarded the game a score of 64%, calling it "...an average, if rather simple, arcade adventure." The same reviewer stated that Obsidian's graphics are its most striking feature. The lack of enemies and objects to manipulate in some screens and low number of sound effects received were criticized. The reviewer for Amstrad Action, Bob Wade, awarded the game a score of 81% and a 'A A Rave' award, praising the game's graphics and animations. He listed the game's robotics enemies as "annoying as you flick between screens". The reviewers differed in opinion on how the game progressed. Wade stated "...as the playing area opens up it soon becomes clear that many objects will be required to complete the game and that some hard thinking as well as trial and error will be needed." Amtix!'s reviewer stated "The trouble was that it became all very predictable and easy to solve once a few puzzles had been solved." Both reviewers stated that the jet pack's controls are too sensitive, making its usage difficult.

Computer and Video Games' reviewer gave the game a score of 7 out of 10 in each of the magazine's scoring criteria — graphics, sound, value and playability. The reviewer stated that the game's premise is unoriginal, but that the game is enjoyable and makes "...full use of the Amstrad's colour graphics..." The reviewer also stated "...the smooth movement of objects and characters makes this game a pleasure to watch and play." The game was reviewed again in Amtix! by Massimo Valducci, several months later when Obsidian was re-released on the budget label Americana. Valducci stated it had been one of his favourite titles when it was originally released, giving the game a rating of 70% and stating "Everyone should have this game in their software collection." He praised the game for adding a twist to the maze theme by disallowing the player from fighting back against threats. He added "...a lot of thought and planning is needed to make your way around the various sections, deactivating the security systems as you go."
