= Captain Morgane and the Golden Turtle =

2012 point-and-click video game

- Developer: Wizarbox
- Publisher: Reef Entertainment
- Directors: Julien Millet; Caroline Sapt; Clélia Tran
- Designers: Jérôme Britneff-Bondy; Jean-Eudes Thuroczy; Steve Ince
- Artist: Natalia Renault
- Writer: Steve Ince
- Engine: OGRE
- Platforms: Windows, PlayStation 3, Wii, Nintendo DS
- Release: EU: March 16, 2012; AU: March 29, 2012
- Genre: Adventure
- Mode: Single-player

Captain Morgane and the Golden Turtle (French: Captain Morgane et la tortue d'or) is a point-and-click adventure game released for Windows, PlayStation 3, Wii and Nintendo DS in 2012. It is a prequel to the 2008 game So Blonde and the 2010 game So Blonde: Back to the Island.

== Plot ==
Game screen and interface

In the 17th century, an eight-year-old girl, Morgane Castillo, lives with her mother, a Spanish woman by the name of Bonita Castillo, on Bounty Island in the Caribbean. Her father, an Italian man named Alessandro who has taken his wife's last name, is a pirate captain whom Morgane only sees when he gets home. The same goes for his first mate, Diego, and Uncle Eduardo. Morgane spends her days doing chores, playing with her friends Nell and Bobby, and preparing for her future as pirate captain despite that it's unheard of for a woman to have that occupation and rank. Her life hits on hard years when first Uncle Eduardo goes missing during a storm and some time later her mother dies. A grieving Alessandro takes Morgane with her on his ship thereafter and the two do not return to Bounty Island until Morgane's 17th birthday. For her birthday, Morgane is promoted to second mate and gets to be acting captain for the day. She is also given two tasks: recruit three new crew members to replace the ones Alessandro fired earlier and find a job worth their time. Morgane gives herself a third task more: help her father finally move on from her mother's death. A fourth and fifth come her way when she sets foot ashore: her childhood friend Nell asks her to find Bobby and Morgane catches a rumor that Uncle Eduardo is still alive.

In her search for work, Morgane meets Thomas Briscoe, a pensioned merchant who wishes to search for the legendary Golden Turtle. This creature has been written about by Buckleberry Tanner, a famous adventurer who died some years ago. Morgane convinces him to hire the Winsome Maid for his quest and the first stop is to be at Crab Island, where Tanner's grave is located. Morgane finds a clue that leads them further to Hollow Island. On Hollow Island, Morgane meets Nathaniel, a former friend of Hilary Simpkins. Simpkins is a rival pirate captain known for his cruelty and from Nathaniel Morgane hears that Diego has befriended him, going by the name Diablo when in his company. Morgane confronts Diego, who assures her his loyalties lie with Alessandro. He gets a chance to prove this when Simpkins abducts Briscoe and Morgane needs help freeing their client. They succeed, but Briscoe has already told Simpkins all he wanted to know and now he's heading with his crew for Briscoe's mansion on Bounty Island. Briscoe demands they return immediately to ensure the safety of his wife Elizabeth. The Winsome Maid hurries to Bounty Island where brains will have to beat brawn. To pay a local for his assistance, Morgane returns to her old home in hopes of finding something. She is attacked by Bonita's ghost who forces her into timewarp-dream state in order to communicate to her about Alessandro and give her the payment she needs to continue her quest. Morgane understands she'll have to bring her father back to the house one of these days, but Elizabeth comes first. Her trick to get to the mansion works and although she and the Briscoes get locked up in a burning house in the process, Morgane gets everyone out safely. While Elizabeth oversees the rebuilding of their home, Thomas continues the quest, now with the extra burden of having to retrieve his wife's stolen jewelry.

Based on clues Morgane found on Hollow Island, the Winsome Maid is brought to the shores of Tanner Island. There, they meet the son of Buckleberry Tanner and learn of the tomb Tanner built to honor his departed wife. Morgane is in the possession of the key to get inside and as expected finds another clue to follow. Back on the ship, she is visited by Bonita's ghost in her room and knows it's time to cure her father. Aware force is in order, she knocks out Alessandro and gets Diego to carry him to the house. After sharing a memory of the times when the house was a haven for all of them, Diego suppresses his own emotions and leaves the procedure to Morgane. Alessandro awakens to find Bonita standing next to him. She urges him to let her go so she can pass on from the limbo his grief puts her in and reminds him they've had their good years, of which Morgane is the proof. At her words, Alessandro's dark clouds dissipate and he acquiesces. Back at the ship, he's a much happier man than he's been in years and admits his foolishness to Morgane and Diego. His recovery comes in time to provide vital information to the quest. Morgane's final clue points towards Atabey Island, but no one knows an island by that name. Alessandro, however, knows that is the name of Hollow Island as given by the native population. Morgane is to talk to the chiefs to learn more. Chief Chemi'n refuses assistance, but Chief Bajari has information that leads them back to Crab Island to look for another map. On Crab Island, Morgane finally catches up with Uncle Eduardo, a parrot, much to the joy of herself, Alessandro, and Diego. Furthermore, Uncle Eduardo is revealed to have once been the companion of Buckleberry Tanner and part of the trail of clues he left behind. It is Uncle Eduardo who finally leads them to Turtle Island.

However, a trap is waiting for them on Turtle Island. Hilary Simpkins has been in cahoots with the local priest, Baba Carey, to squeeze out the island's riches, which include sacred objects. Baba Carey is the only surviving priest and therefore the only person who knows the location of the Golden Turtle, which is a deity of the Caribbean and protector of Turtle Island. To prevent the other islanders from catching on to his scheme by talking to the protector, he claims to not know where the Golden Turtle is either. The crew of the Winsome Maid is taken captive by the islanders on orders of Baba Carey as instructed by Simpkins, but Morgane escapes. On the beach, she finds Bobby, an unfit member of Simpkins's crew, and tells him of Nell's feelings as well as gets him to aid her. She also meets a young native girl, Tanama, who becomes her companion on the search for the Golden Turtle. They succeed and are informed of everything that Turtle Island has suffered in the past years. The worst of it is that Baba Carey has stolen the sacred turtle egg and the Golden Turtle is close to dying. Without the egg, no new Golden Turtle will be born. Thus informed, Morgane retrieves it, but she is followed by Baba Carey who tries to kill her. Tanama takes the blow, gravely wounding her, and the Golden Turtle declares Baba Carey to be a priest no more. The guard that had come along promptly stops taking orders from the ex-priest, causing a stalemate. Morgane places the sacred egg back on its altar to bring about the new Golden Turtle, who cures Tanama and declares her the new priest, Bibi Carey. Baba Carey is taken away for trial and Morgane is joined by Briscoe and Alessandro. Now knowing the truth of the Golden Turtle, Briscoe is a satisfied customer. Alessandro expresses his pride in having Morgane as his daughter, more so when they are rewarded with a glimpse into the whole sacred network of the Caribbean and are allowed to pick one item from the temples treasures. They find and pick the White Gold Skull, a legendary talking skull said to be the lead to Ruby Heart's treasure. After expressing their thanks, they leave to deal with Simpkins. They take his ship and leave him and his crew (minus Bobby) stranded, making him their mortal enemy.

== Development ==
The revelation announcement for Captain Morgane and the Golden Turtle took place on July 25, 2011. The promotional website was opened up on September 14, 2011.
