= Combat School =

1987 video game

- Japanese arcade flyer
- Developer: Konami
- Publisher: Konami
- Platforms: Arcade, Commodore 64, Amstrad CPC, ZX Spectrum, MS-DOS
- Release: JP: April 2, 1987; WW: August 1987
- Genres: Sports, action
- Modes: Single-player, multiplayer

Combat School, (Note: Japanese: コンバットスクール, Hepburn: Konbatto Sukūru) released as Boot Camp in North America, is a 1987 sports action video game developed and published by Konami for arcades. The player takes control of a military recruit who is undergoing basic training at a United States Marine Corps Recruit Training camp, also known as a boot camp. The arcade game uses trackball controls.

In 1987, Ocean Software released ports of the game for the Commodore 64, ZX Spectrum, and Amstrad CPC in Europe. Konami themselves later released the Commodore 64 version in North America under the Boot Camp title in 1989 alongside an MS-DOS version. An Amiga version was announced, but never released.

Hamster Corporation released the game as part of their Arcade Archives series for the Nintendo Switch and PlayStation 4, as well as their Arcade Archives 2 series for the Nintendo Switch 2, PlayStation 5 and Xbox Series X/S in August 2026.

== Gameplay ==
The control panel consists of a trackball and two buttons with different functions depending on the event. The game can be played against a CPU-controlled opponent or a second player. Player 1 takes control of Nick, a brown-haired recruit in an orange shirt, while Player 2 is Joe, a blond-haired recruit in a blue shirt.

The game is composed of seven training events whom the player must complete. Upon a near-success failure to complete an event (failing too severely results in game over), the player must do a set number of chin ups as punishment (this chance is given only once) in order to continue into the succeeding events, or it is game over.

After all seven events are cleared, the player graduates from basic training only to be sent on a mission (the 8th and final stage) to rescue the U.S. President from armed terrorists. The final stage consists of a single side-scrolling level where the player must fight off terrorists using all the skills acquired during the course of training. This stage can only be played by one player. Without a continue feature or spare stocks of lives, and because the player dies with one hit (minus the part that pits the player in a hand-to-hand combat against the terrorist leader) from anything, the final stage is extremely difficult to clear.

== Reception ==
Reception

Award
Publication	Award
Crash	Smash

In Japan, Game Machine listed Combat School on their July 1, 1987 issue as being the fourth most-successful table arcade unit of the month.

Your Sinclair magazine gave the arcade game a positive review, comparing "Konami's new military arcade game" favorably with Konami's earlier Olympic video game Hyper Sports (1984).

Cabal, released several months later, had similar trackball controls to Combat School.

== See also ==
- 19 Part One: Boot Camp
