= 19 Part One: Boot Camp =

1988 video game

- Commodore 64 box
- Developer: Cascade Games
- Composer: Rob Hubbard
- Platforms: Commodore 64, ZX Spectrum
- Release: 1988
- Genre: Action
- Mode: Single-player

19 Part One: Boot Camp is a multi-part action video game released by Cascade Games in 1988 for the Commodore 64 and ZX Spectrum. The inspiration for the game came from two sources: the arcade game Combat School and the Paul Hardcastle song 19, which was itself about the Vietnam War. The player controls a soldier through several training events, including an obstacle course, shooting practice and jeep driving.

== Gameplay ==
C64 screenshot

The game is split into four stages:

Stage One is an assault course. The player must gain speed by pressing the right directional key (or holding the joystick to the right), then hold down the fire key/button to build up power then release it at the correct spot in front of the obstacle.

Stage Two is a shooting range. Targets appear which the player must shoot targets depicting enemy soldiers, while avoiding those that depict women and children. For every soldier hit the player earns up to 50 points, but for hitting a woman the player loses 1000 points.

Stage Three is a driving game. The player's point of view is behind and just above a jeep which must be driven along a course. Obstacles must be avoided, but a variety of other objects, such as ammo boxes, jerry cans and, boots can be collected for bonus points.

Stage Four is a beat 'em up which involves the player attempting to defeat the Master Sergeant (spelled "Sargeant" in the game) within a set time limit.

== Reception ==
Reception

Review scores
| Publication | Score |
|---|---|
| Crash | 91% (A CRASH Smash) |
| Sinclair User | 8/10 |
| Your Sinclair | 7/10 |

CRASH awarded the game a CRASH Smash at 91%, Sinclair User gave it 8/10 and Your Sinclair awarded 7/10.

Sinclair User's Chris Jenkins said of the game: "If you don't mind the inevitable wait for the multi-load, it's a corker." CRASH's Nick Roberts declared that "Each training event could be released separately as an individual game and it would still be worth the money!", while Your Sinclair's Marcus Berkmann decided that "it's only the Shooting Range that's really special."

Commodore User's Mark Patterson said the game was "surprisingly good - not fantastic, but still a darn good game."

== Legacy ==
There was a sequel planned, 19 Part 2: Combat Zone, that would have taken the action to the warzone itself. Players would train in Part One and then save their character/score to be loaded into the second part. However, Cascade disappeared from the scene and eventually folded.
