= Virtual Theatre =

Game engine by Revolution Software

- Developer(s): Revolution Software
- Platform: Amiga, Atari ST, PC (MS-DOS and Windows), PlayStation, Macintosh, Linux
- Type: Game engine
- License: Proprietary
- Website: revolution.co.uk

The Virtual Theatre is a computer game engine designed by Revolution Software to produce adventure games for computer platforms. The engine allowed their team to script events, and move animated sprites against a drawn background with moving elements using a point-and-click style interface. Upon its first release, it rivaled competing engines like LucasArts' SCUMM and Sierra's Creative Interpreter, due to its then high level of artificial intelligence. The engine was first proposed in 1989, while the first game to use it, Lure of the Temptress, was released in 1992, followed by Beneath a Steel Sky (1994), Broken Sword: The Shadow of the Templars (1996) and Broken Sword II: The Smoking Mirror (1997).

It allowed in-game characters to wander around the gameworld independently of each other, performing "everyday life" actions, which was not previously possible, and all characters and objects occupied space; consequently, non-player characters had to side-step the player's protagonist and any other object they came across, as well as the player having to side-step them, achieving a more realistic game world that previous engines were unable to provide, though non-player characters could unwittingly block a path as the player was traversing the game scene. Non-player characters performed much simpler tasks with each release due to size constraints.

Two games (Broken Sword: The Shadow of the Templars and Broken Sword II: The Smoking Mirror) that use a Virtual Theatre variant engine can now be played on modern hardware using ScummVM, which as a result allows the engine to run on platforms where the titles were not officially released. In 2012, it was confirmed that the engine would be revived as "Virtual Theatre 7" for the fifth Broken Sword titled Broken Sword: The Serpent's Curse (2013).

== Development ==
Charles Cecil and Tony Warriner had worked together at Artic Computing, an English video game development company. In 1990 they decided to set up their own video-game development company, together with David Sykes and Noirin Carmody. For their debut adventure game, Lure of the Temptress, released in 1992 for Amiga, Atari ST and PC, Cecil, Warriner, Sykes and Dan Marchant created the concept of the game engine titled "Virtual Theatre", which Warriner wrote.

For Beneath a Steel Sky, released in 1994 for Amiga, and PC, Revolution used an updated version of Virtual Theatre, Virtual Theatre 2.0, written by Warriner and Sykes. However, because the game was six times the size of Lure of the Temptress, non-player characters had to perform much simpler tasks than in its predecessor. Broken Sword: The Shadow of the Templars, released in 1996 for PC, Mac and PlayStation, and its sequel, Broken Sword II: The Smoking Mirror, released in 1997 for PC and PlayStation, also used modified versions of the Virtual Theatre engine. The engine subsequently underwent various updates. For Broken Sword: The Serpent's Curse a brand-new engine (VT7) was developed in order to deal with multiple platforms and, in particular, with screen resolution (the system is built on C++ and OpenGL, and a custom scripting-language to implement the game itself).

== Features ==
Traditionally in adventure game engines, non-player characters were static awaiting the player to interact with them to trigger an event. However, Virtual Theatre allowed non-player characters to traverse the world in seemingly random patterns, interacting with their environment. Upon the engine's first release, it rivaled competing engines such as LucasArts' SCUMM engine, and Sierra's Creative Interpreter, due to its then high level of artificial intelligence.

Another advantage of the engine is that it is a cross-platform engine. It was also faster on the Amiga than the C code that was used by many USA programmers at that time. Compared to the Sierra titles, the engine became in this respect more sophisticated, a reason why Revolution did the conversion of King's Quest VI to the Amiga.

All of the in-game objects (including non-player characters) in Virtual Theatre occupied space, which was a unique feature for an engine at the time. Consequently, non-player characters had to side-step the player's protagonist and any other object they came across, as well as the player had to side step them. When a non-player character bypassed the protagonist, he or she uttered a comment (like "Excuse me, Sir"). As the result, the engine achieved a more realistic game world than previous engines were able to provide, though non-player characters could unwittingly block a path as the player was traversing the game scene. This was remedied with the release of Broken Sword: The Shadow of the Templars, where the protagonist, if found his way blocked by another character, could simply walk through them.

Two games (Broken Sword: The Shadow of the Templars and Broken Sword II: The Smoking Mirror) that use a Virtual Theatre variant engine can now be played on modern hardware using ScummVM.
