= Broken Sword II: The Smoking Mirror =

1997 point-and-click adventure video game

- European cover art
- Developer: Revolution Software
- Publishers: Virgin Interactive: Broken Sword II: The Smoking Mirror Microsoft Windows Virgin Interactive PlayStation; EU: Sony Computer Entertainment; NA: Crave Entertainment Remastered Microsoft Windows & OS X Kalypso Media iOS & Android Revolution Software
- Director: Charles Cecil
- Producers: Steve Ince; Michael Merren
- Writers: Charles Cecil; Dave Cummins; Jonathan Howard; Steve Ince
- Composer: Barrington Pheloung
- Series: Broken Sword
- Engine: Virtual Theatre
- Platforms: Microsoft Windows; PlayStation; Remastered; OS X iOS; Android
- Release: 14 October 1997: Broken Sword II: The Smoking Mirror Microsoft Windows; NA: 14 October 1997; EU: 17 October 1997 PlayStation; EU: 11 December 1997; NA: 8 December 1999 Remastered Microsoft Windows & OS X; NA: 7 September 2010; EU: 9 April 2011 iOS; WW: 16 December 2010 Android; WW: 11 December 2012
- Genre: Point-and-click adventure
- Mode: Single-player

Broken Sword II: The Smoking Mirror is a point-and-click adventure video game developed by Revolution Software for Microsoft Windows and PlayStation. Originally released in 1997, it was re-released on Microsoft Windows, OS X and iOS as a remastered edition in 2010 and on Android in 2012. It is the second instalment in the Broken Sword series, and the first game in the series that does not follow the Knights Templar storyline. The player assumes the role of George Stobbart, a young American who is an eyewitness to the kidnapping of his girlfriend Nicole Collard.

Though serious in tone, The Smoking Mirror incorporates some humour and graphics animated in the style of classic animated films. It was the fourth and last game built with the Virtual Theatre engine, which was used to render the locations of the game's events.

Unlike the first Broken Sword game, which garnered critical acclaim, The Smoking Mirror received mixed reviews, mostly for not living up to its predecessor. Nevertheless, it was a commercial success, selling 750,000 copies by August 2000. The remastered edition, unlike the original version, received highly favorable reviews from critics.

== Gameplay ==
Broken Sword II: The Smoking Mirror is a 2D adventure game played from a third-person perspective. Via a point-and-click interface, the player guides protagonist George Stobbart through the game's world and interacts with the environment by selecting from multiple commands, while Nicole Collard is also a playable character in selected portions of the game. The player controls George's movements and actions with a mouse (PC and PlayStation), or a gamepad (PlayStation). Player can collect objects that can be used with either other collectible objects, parts of the scenery, or with other people in order to solve puzzles and progress in the game. George can engage in dialogue with other characters through conversation trees to gain hints of what needs to be done to solve the puzzles or to progress the plot. The player uses a map to travel, and new locations are added to it as the story unfolds. By right clicking on an object, the player gets a description and clues. The player character's death is possible if the player makes a wrong decision.

== Plot ==
Six months after the events of The Shadow of the Templars, George Stobbart returns to Paris after attending to his father's funeral and reunites with his friend Nicole Collard. George learns that Nicole had recently begun researching a new story when she found herself receiving a mysterious Mayan stone from a contact. Seeking answers, she invites George to join her for a meeting with an archaeologist named Professor Oubier to learn more about it. Upon arriving at Oubier's home, the pair are ambushed by Central Americans; Nicole is kidnapped, while George is knocked out and trapped in a burning room. Escaping his predicament, George contacts Andre Lobineau, who arranged the meeting, for assistance, and soon learns that Nicole was taken to the warehouse of Condor Transglobal in Marseilles. Upon rescuing her, George learns from Nicole that the company is headed by a man named Karzac – the head of a drug smuggling ring she was investigating – and that he is seeking the stone for unknown reasons, with Oubier working for him.

The pair find themselves traveling to Quaramonte City, where Oubier has been for the past several months, and soon learn that the region's leader, Presidente Grasiento, and her son Raoul, are in league with Karzac. Discovering they are conducting a secret excavation deep in the jungle, the pair proceed towards it by river boat, but an attack helicopter strands the pair, and leaves Nicole being poisoned by a snake. Aided by a Christian missionary, George visits the shaman of a local village for a cure, and in the process learns about the stone in their possession. The shaman reveals the stone to be one of three created by Mayan shamans centuries ago, in order to fully entrap the god Tezcatlipoca inside a mirror before he could lay waste to the world. All three were taken by Spanish explorers – while the pair's stone reached Spain, the other two were taken by privateers. The shaman reveals the god will be freed soon during a solar eclipse, marking the end of the fifth age in the Mayan calendar.

After curing Nicole and explaining what he learnt, the pair split up to locate the other two stones. George proceeds to the Caribbean to track down the home of the Spanish pirate that stole the second stone. Befriending the owners and their granddaughter, George locates where the stone was hidden, and retrieves it. Meanwhile, Nicole heads to London to track down the third stone, after discovering it was stolen by an English pirate. Before she can retrieve it, Oubier steals it, and forces Nicole to use an abandoned subway station to escape. Tracking him down to the city's docks, Nicole discovers Oubier was merely being used by Karzac, who promptly kills him. Nicole quickly recovers the stone and escapes with it. Returning to Quaramonte, Nicole heads for the village in the jungle, only to discover it burned to the ground.

Finding that George hid the stones in the village, one held by a dwarf Central American he freed in Marseilles named Titipoco, Nicole proceeds to track him down, and soon discovers him being prepared to be sacrificed at the top of a Mayan pyramid. Creating a diversion, Nicole frees him, and the pair rush into the pyramid, while Raoul finally decides to oppose Karzac's plans, deeming it evil. Inside the pyramid, the group become separated, but overcome traps and puzzles to reach the chamber housing Tezcatlipoca's prison, with Karzac preparing to release the god. Nicole promptly puts a stone into its place. Titipoco handles the second stone, and is rescued by Raoul when his mother attempts to stop him, leaving her to fall to her death. As Tezcatlipoca emerges from the mirror, killing Karzac, George secures the third stone in place, imprisoning the god completely into the mirror. Relieved, the group head outside to watch the eclipse end and celebrate, and the final cut-scene fades into the credits.

== Development ==
Broken Sword II: The Smoking Mirror was conceived in 1997, by Charles Cecil, head of Revolution Software. Charles Cecil was the director and writer of the game; Tony Warriner, David Sykes, Jonathan Howard, Paul Porter, James Long, Patrick Skelton, Chris Rea and Pete Ellacot worked on the software side of the project. Noirin Carmody was the executive producer. The game uses the Virtual Theatre engine, which was previously used for Lure of the Temptress, Beneath a Steel Sky, and Broken Sword: The Shadow of the Templars.

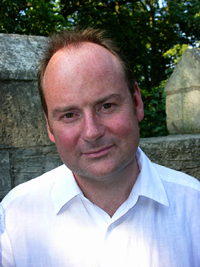
Charles Cecil, the game's director.

The artwork for Broken Sword II was developed through a number of stages. Initially pencil drawings were made of characters which were then digitally coloured in, before being cleaned up. The background layouts were produced in a similar way, starting out as pencil designs, and were all drawn by Eoghan Cahill and Neil Breen, who previously worked on the first Broken Sword, working together with Amy Berenz and Lee Taylor. The game's graphics are animated in a style which resembles classic animated films. Broken Sword II was developed in one year and with half the budget of the original Broken Sword. According to Tony Warriner, this transpired because "Virgin appeared not to be fully at ease with the idea of adventure games", and from the outset limited the team's resources compared to the first project.

The music in the game was composed by Barrington Pheloung, who also composed the music in Shadow of the Templars, with Bob Sekar adding the closing score. Audio features of the game include recorded sound effects, orchestral music and voice acting directed by Edward Hall. While Rolf Saxon returned to voice George Stobbart, a new actress, Jenny Caron Hall, was cast as Nicole Collard. The rest of the credited voice actors in the game are Dennis Chinnery, Stephanie Clive, Jeff Fletcher, Corey Johnson, Chris Miles, Gary Parker, Flaminia Cinque and Leo Wringer.

=== Remastered edition ===
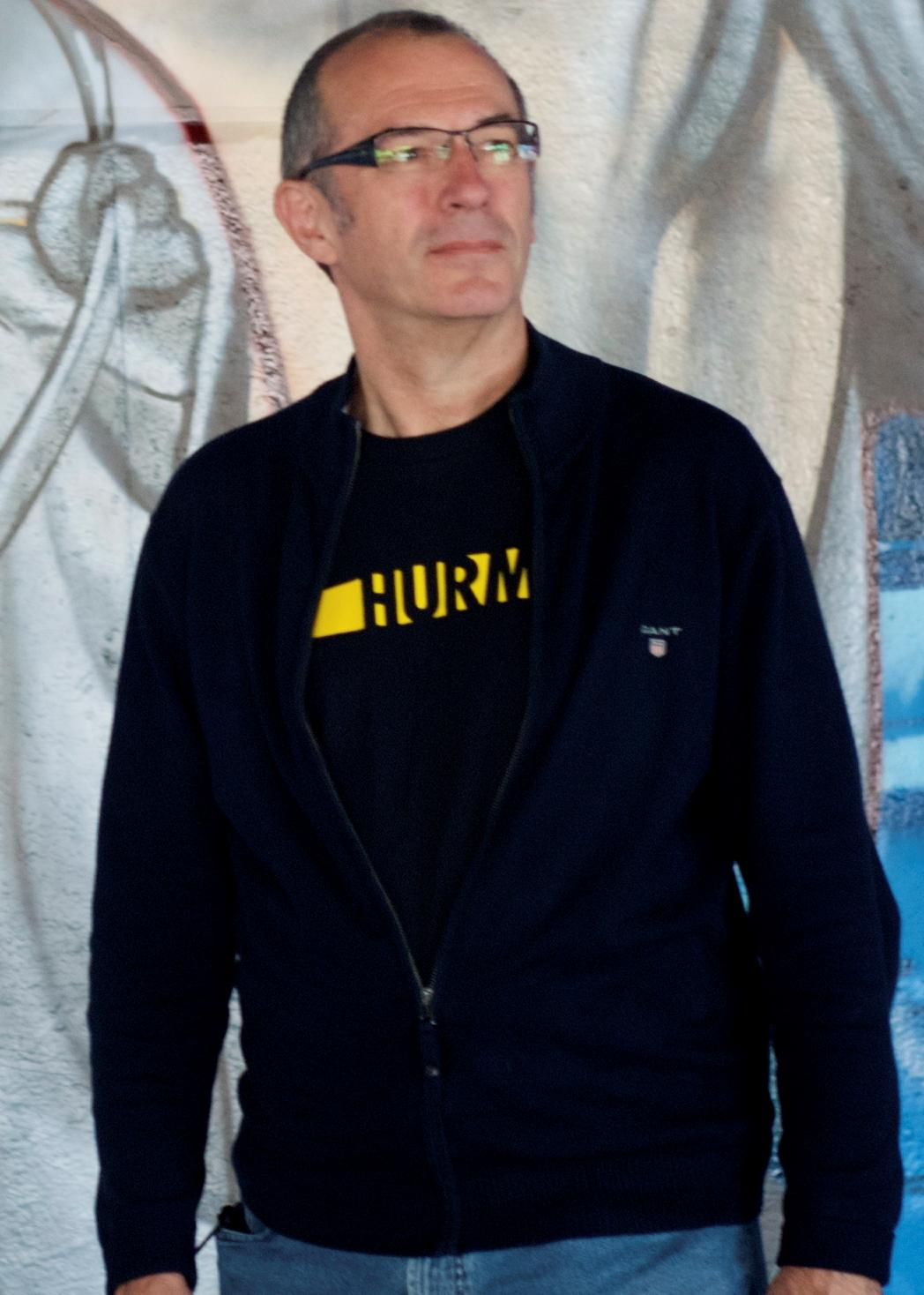
Dave Gibbons worked on the game's visual references and digital comic.

When considering the project, Charles Cecil played the game again and noticed many issues, including pixelated backgrounds and FMV and audio of poor quality. He also felt some dialogue was out of place. He thought all these elements could be addressed and improved in a remastered edition, in which they could add a diary, hint system, and new artwork from Dave Gibbons, which they could offer as an interactive digital comic.

Revolution Software announced the release of Broken Sword: The Smoking Mirror - Remastered on iOS devices, and was released on 16 December 2010. The new features include an exclusive interactive digital comic from Dave Gibbons, fully animated facial expressions, enhanced graphics, high quality music, a context-sensitive hint system, diary, and a Dropbox integration which facilitates a unique cross-platform save-game feature, enabling players to enjoy the same adventure simultaneously on multiple devices (although Dropbox support was removed after the initial release). It also featured full Game Center integration – including in-game achievements. The Mac and PC versions followed in early 2011.

=== Cancelled Game Boy Advance version ===
A version of The Smoking Mirror was planned for release on the Game Boy Advance, with the game being 99% complete according to Warriner. However, the publisher of the Game Boy Advance version of its predecessor, BAM! Entertainment, went under weeks before completion, causing the game to be cancelled. Warriner retains an archived copy in his possession.

=== Marketing and release ===
A launch trailer for the iPhone and iPod touch version was also released on Revolution's YouTube channel revolutionbevigilant. On the second day of Apple's 12 Days of Christmas, Broken Sword II - Remastered was made free to download for 24 hours.

The original PC version is available from Sold-Out Software and GOG.com (with purchases of Broken Sword II - Remastered). However, the Remastered version of the game is available from various digital distribution services, including the iPhone/iPod Touch and iPad AppStore, Mac AppStore, Intel AppUp, Steam and GOG.com. Broken Sword II - Remastered is also a part of the Broken Sword Complete package from Mastertronic.

With purchases of Broken Sword II - Remastered on GOG.com, the consumer also gets the original game, the manual, an exclusive game guide, 18 artworks, and the comic book. The digital Broken Sword: The Smoking Mirror - Remastered comic book was created by Dave Gibbons. The short comic provides information on what happened before the beginning of the game.

== Reception ==
Reception

Review scores
Publication	Score
GameSpot	7.9/10
Next Generation	3/5
PC Gamer (UK)	82%
Gaming Age	B+
Four Fat Chicks	Thumbs up icon
Mr. Bill's Adventureland	(acclaim)

Broken Sword II was a commercial success. By August 2000, it had achieved sales of 750,000 copies, of which 510,000 were sold at full price. Like the original Broken Sword, it was particularly a hit on the PlayStation, despite low sales forecasts. The two games together sold roughly 2 million units by March 2001.

The Smoking Mirror received mixed reviews from critics. Gaming Age gave the game a B+, saying: "The sound is another area in which The Smoking Mirror excels. Although there isn't a constant soundtrack playing, haunting music often accompanies certain actions, much like the original Tomb Raider". PC Gamer gave it a score of 82%, saying it's "more of the same solid adventure fare found in Circle of Blood". GameSpot gave the game a 7.9 out of 10 and praised it for its additions that "help to streamline the adventure", but criticized the "insufficient information about Tezcatlipoca and Maya civilization altogether" when it came to the storyline. Jen of Four Fat Chicks gave it a "thumbs up" and stated that he would recommend this game for the good storyline and the beautiful graphics, but if players want a game that has more adventuring, they should look elsewhere. "Mr. Bill and Lela" of Mr. Bill's Adventureland praised its controls and humor, and called it an excellent sequel that they wouldn't want to have missed out on playing.

Next Generation reviewed the PC version of the game, rating it three stars out of five, and wrote that "Smoking Mirror may not be an outstanding leap in graphic adventures, but much like the sequel to a good book, it's a fun romp with familiar characters and well-worth the price of purchase".

=== Remastered Edition ===
Reception

Review scores
Publication	Score
GameZone	8/10
AppSafari	5/5
AppGamer	10/10
TouchGen	4/5
148 Apps	4/5

Unlike the original release, Broken Sword: The Smoking Mirror has received very positive reviews from critics. AppSafari gave the game a 5 out of 5: "Production values for the game are sky-high, with gorgeous graphics, challenging, well-designed puzzles, and pitch-perfect voice acting. The sequel also implements the same fantastic touch interface of its predecessor". AppGamer gave the game a 10 out of 10: "Broken Sword 2 will last you hours, having all the playability of a full-priced PC game. It is the kind of game that could convert people who wouldn't look twice at adventure games, and is easily one of my most highly recommended titles on the platform". GameZone gave the game an 8 out of 10 and praised the game's controls and cut scenes, but stated that the iPad version of the game can be blurry at times. Carl Stevens of TouchGen gave the game 4 out of 5 stars and stated that it should be on everybody's "must play list" and that the ease of, and restriction between some puzzles were the only let down in the game. Jeniffer Allen of 148Apps gave the game a 4 out of 5 stars and praised it, saying: "Broken Sword: The Smoking Mirror is a fantastic game. The story feels as fresh and as entertaining as it did back in the day, and the slightly improved graphics are much appreciated. Many hours of entertaining storytelling lie ahead".
