= Steve Ince =

British writer and game designer (born 1958)

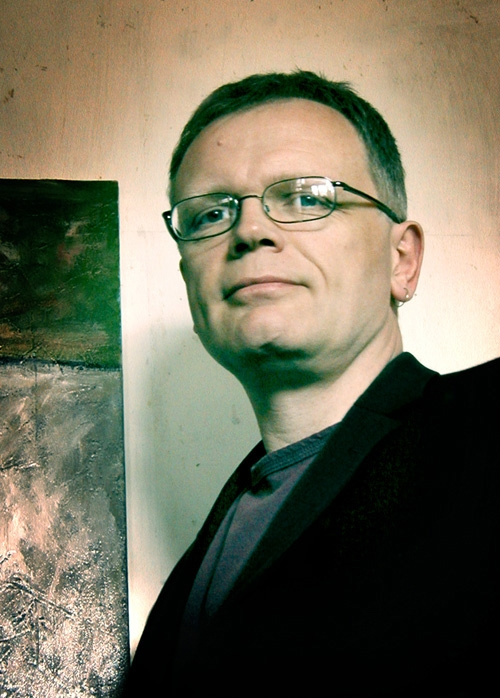
- Born: 21 February 1958 (age 68)
- Occupations: Writer, Game Designer
- Known for: Revolution Software, Juniper Games
- Notable work: Broken Sword series, Beneath a Steel Sky, So Blonde
- Spouse: June Sutherby
- Website: http://www.steve-ince.co.uk/

Steve Ince (born 21 February 1958) is a British writer and game designer, known for his work on Revolution Software titles such as the Broken Sword series, and is working on a freelance basis.

Before entering the video game industry, Ince earned a degree in astronomy and astrophysics at the University of Newcastle-upon-Tyne. In 1993, Ince was employed by Revolution Software, where he worked on titles such as Beneath a Steel Sky, the Broken Sword series, In Cold Blood and Gold and Glory: The Road to El Dorado. He left the company in 2004, and set up a new website, Steve Ince Solutions, offering solutions for writing and design in the video game industry.

Ince is also a creator of various comic strips and in 2004 a collection of one of his comic strips was published by BookSurge Publishing. In 2005 he launched Juniper Games, a label under which he would develop his own games, which was followed by the release of its first game, Mr. Smoozles Goes Nutso. He also announced a new company, InceSight, through which he offered his skills and experience to developers and publishers in need of assistance in the fields of writing and game design. Ince wrote down his ideas on game design in a series on Developing Thoughts, and in a book entitled Writing for Video Games.

As writer, designer or script editor Ince has been working on a number of games, most notably Agatha Christie: And Then There Were None, The Witcher, So Blonde and The Whispered World. When Revolution started working on remakes of the first two Broken Sword games for newer platforms in 2009 and 2010, Ince became involved again. During this time he also worked on Spare Parts, The Witcher 2: Assassins of Kings, and ScanMe, and on casual/hidden object games, such as Rhianna Ford and The Da Vinci Letter and two Special Enquiry Detail games. For Broken Sword: The Sleeping Dragon, Ince received a nomination for Excellence in Writing at the Game Developers Choice Awards 2004. In 2008 he received another nomination from the Writers' Guild of Great Britain in the category of Best Video Game Script for the game So Blonde. As of February 2012 Ince is represented by the SMART Talent agency.

== Biography ==
=== Early career and Revolution Software ===
Before entering the game industry, Ince earned a degree in astronomy and astrophysics at the University of Newcastle-upon-Tyne (1979). After a few jobs, including writing and drawing a cartoon strip for a local newspaper, he managed to get a job at Revolution Software in February 1993, about two years after the company was founded.

He was hired by Revolution as an artist to work on what would become Broken Sword: The Shadow of the Templars, but he also worked on Beneath a Steel Sky, which had already been in production for some time. As he was also doing a lot of organising, Revolution's MD Charles Cecil asked him to become producer of the Broken Sword: The Shadow of the Templars, and he was also the producer of its sequel, Broken Sword: The Smoking Mirror.

As producer, Ince sat in on a lot of story and design meetings, and in time he became more and more involved in the designing and writing side of the games. For the third episode in the series, Broken Sword: The Sleeping Dragon (2003), he co-wrote the story and the dialogue, and became lead designer on the project. When the fourth game, Broken Sword: The Angel of Death (2006), was first being discussed, he was asked to be involved, but he was already working freelance and committed to another project, So Blonde, an opportunity for him to write a whole game almost from ground up.

Besides his work on the Broken Sword series, he also worked on other games by Revolution: In Cold Blood (2000) and Gold and Glory: The Road to El Dorado (2000). In Cold Blood was the first game where he had a big hand in the writing and it was the first game for which he wrote any dialogue.

=== Departure from Revolution ===
In May 2004, when Revolution had to let go most of its members because a project didn't get signed, Ince set up a new website, Steve Ince Solutions, where he offered solutions for writing and design in the game industry. In the next month he became a writer for AllintheGame Ltd., one of the biggest UK talent agencies for voice acting and production. In the same month he added a blog Writing and Design, a spin-off of his older blog Life in the Crescent at his existing website, Juniper Crescent. He was also working on comic strips, and in 2004 a collection of his strips Juniper Crescent and The Sapphire Claw became available as Crescent And Claw, Vol. 1 (BookSurge Publishing).

On 29 April 2005 Ince launched Juniper Games, a label under which he would develop his own games. He added a new website and announced his debut game, Juniper Crescent – The Sapphire Claw, based on his comic strip Scout the One-Eyed cat. Because of lack of funding the game, with its complex art and animation, wasn't finished. During this time he also worked as script editor on Wanted: A Wild Western Adventure (Revistronic, 2004), as writer on The Three Musketeers (Legendo, 2005), and as script editor on Agatha Christie: And Then There Were None (Awe Games, 2005).

On 26 August 2005 Ince announced a new company, InceSight, through which he offered his skills and experience to those developers and publishers in need of a proven professional in the fields of writing and game design. On 16 November 2005, Juniper Games presented an arcade-style adventure game entitled Mr. Smoozles Goes Nutso. The game was based on his online serial comic strip Mr. Smoozles, and featured an original soundtrack by composer Josh Winiberg. It went on sale in September 2006, and was made available to download for free in June 2008.

Besides working on new games in this period, Ince also wrote a book called Writing for Video Games (A & C Black, 2006). His book, with a foreword by Revolution's Tony Warriner, deals with all aspects of game production and the writer's role in the development process, and which skills are required. It includes for instance chapters on "Interactive Narrative" and "Dialog and Logic", and examples of a design document and script are added. Previously he had already written on game design, and in 2006–2007 he wrote down more of his ideas in a series on Developing Thoughts. After the extensive series Ince continued to publish on aspects of game design.

Other games Ince worked on since then are The Witcher (CD Projekt Red, 2007); Delicious – Emily's Tea Garden (GameHouse, 2008); So Blonde (Wizarbox, 2008); Delicious – Emily's Holiday Season (GameHouse, 2009); Rhianna Ford and the Da Vinci Letter (Green Clover Games, 2010); Alice in Wonderland (Gimagin/Merscom, 2010); Special Enquiry Detail: The Hand that Feeds (Floodlight Games, 2010), So Blonde: Back to the Island (Wizarbox, 2010), and The Whispered World (Daedalic Entertainment, 2010).

For So Blonde Ince was contacted by Wizarbox, whose crew had already done some concept work of the main character, some of the locations, and they had an idea for the story. They brought Ince in to develop the story, but in a way he became the public face of the game, and he went to Leipzig and Paris on promotional tours.

Ince got involved with Revolution again when they started working on remakes of the first two Broken Sword games for newer platforms: Broken Sword: The Shadow of the Templars – Director's Cut and Broken Sword: The Smoking Mirror – Remastered. During this time he also worked on Spare Parts (EA Bright Light, 2010), Special Enquiry Detail: The Hand that Feeds (Floodlight Games, 2011), The Witcher 2: Assassins of Kings (CD Projekt Red, 2011), and ScanMe (ScanMe.com, 2011).

Special Enquiry Detail: The Hand that Feeds, written and designed by Ince, is one of his casual/hidden object games. The critically acclaimed detective adventure game debuted on the Mac App Store in January 2012. It was followed by a sequel, Special Enquiry Detail: Engaged to Kill (G5 Entertainment, March 2012). So Blonde also got a follow-up, Captain Morgane and the Golden Turtle (Wizarbox, 2012), that is set back in pirate times. Ince gave some video interviews to introduce the game.

As of February 2012 Ince was represented by the SMART Talent agency.

=== Award nominations ===
For Broken Sword: The Sleeping Dragon, Ince received a nomination for Excellence in Writing at the Game Developers Choice Awards 2004. In 2008 he received another nomination from the Writers' Guild of Great Britain in the category of Best Video Game Script for So Blonde.

=== Personal life ===
Ince lives with his partner, June, in the East Yorkshire countryside. They have a tabby cat, Merlin, and fish in the garden pond. He has three sons, Shaun, David and Jason, as well as five granddaughters, Caitlin, Leilani, Selene, Freya and Ariana, and a grandson, Louie. On his website Steve Ince, Writer, Game Designer he has a blog on Writing and Design, and he also writes a more personal blog called It Happened So Fast.
