= Lure of the Temptress =

1992 video game

- Developer(s): Revolution Software
- Publisher(s): Virgin Interactive Entertainment
- Director(s): Charles Cecil
- Producer(s): Daniel Marchant
- Designer(s): Dave Cummins
- Programmer(s): David Sykes; Tony Warriner
- Artist(s): Stephen Oades; Adam Tween; Paul Docherty
- Composer(s): Richard Joseph
- Engine: Virtual Theatre
- Platform(s): MS-DOS, Amiga, Atari ST
- Release: June 1992 (Amiga), October 1992 (MS-DOS)
- Genre(s): Adventure
- Mode(s): Single-player

Lure of the Temptress is a point-and-click adventure game published by Virgin Interactive Entertainment in June 1992 for Atari ST, MS-DOS, and Amiga. It was the first game developed by Revolution Software and uses their proprietary Virtual Theatre engine. The player assumes the role of Diermot, a young peasant who has to overthrow an evil sorceress. The game was well-received and re-released as freeware on April 1, 2003.

== Gameplay ==
Lure of the Temptress is a 2D adventure game played from a third-person perspective. Via a point-and-click interface and a system of drop-down lists, the player guides protagonist Diermot through the game's world and interacts with the environment by selecting from multiple commands.

The player controls Diermot's movements and actions with a mouse or a gamepad. Diermot can pick up various objects; these can then be used with either other collectible objects, parts of the scenery, or with other people in order to solve puzzles and progress in the game. He can also engage in dialogue with other characters through conversation trees to gain hints of what needs to be done to solve the puzzles or progress the plot. A few simple action-oriented battle scenes are also included.

== Plot ==
Gameplay screenshot from the game's opening chapter of dungeon escape

A young peasant named Diermot is employed as a beater for the king's hunting party. One night the king receives a note from a messenger, requesting his services to help quell a rebellion in the remote village of Turnvale. As the king's party departs, Diermot's pony follows them, unwittingly carrying him to the battle. When the party arrives at Turnvale they are not confronted by a peasant revolt. Instead they find a band of man-eating Skorl, led by an enchantress named Selena, the titular temptress. The king's men are defeated and the king is killed. In the process, Diermot is thrown from his saddle and is knocked unconscious. The Skorl take Diermot prisoner and imprison him in the local dungeon.

With help from a peasant named Ratpouch, Diermot manages to escape from the dungeon and visits Luthern, the blacksmith. Luthern reveals that a girl named Goewin who runs a herb shop has recently disappeared. Diermot discovers that she had been arrested by the Skorl. With help from Ratpouch, Diermot breaks into the house of Taidgh, the magician, where he creates a potion which disguises him as Selena. He enters the mansion where Goewin is being held and orders the Skorl to free her. Not long after, a man named Mallin gives Diermot a book wrapped in cloth to take to a man named Morkus. In the process of delivering the book, Diermot sees a notice stating that whoever returns the book to its rightful owner will be rewarded. Diermot delivers the book to a man named Toby, who rewards him with a statuette. Toby reveals that the dragon can help Diermot defeat Selena, but that he will need an infusion made of three herbs to wake the dragon up, which Goewin then makes for Diermot.

Diermot enters the dragon's cave and wakes him up. The dragon agrees to help Diermot, revealing that Turnvale was the domain of a demon long before humans came to the area. This demon should have died along with his breed long ago, but did not perish because it was able to feed on man's greed and ambition in order to survive. The demon was driven out by the great Gethryn, but the young sorceress Selena's meddling with evil has reawakened the demon, and it controls her mortal form. The dragon possesses the Eye of Gethryn, an enchanted stone left by Gethryn at the time of his death. The stone contains the power to defeat the demon, and the dragon then gives the stone to Diermot. A Skorl named Wayne, who turns against Selena, sneaks Diermot into Selena's castle in a barrel. Diermot defeats Selena with the Eye of Gethryn, freeing Turnvale from her tyranny.

== Development and release ==
Charles Cecil and Tony Warriner had worked together at Artic Computing, an English video game development company. In 1990, they decided that they would set up their own video game development company, together with David Sykes and Noirin Carmody. The four started up Revolution Software, initially based in Hull, with a 10 thousand pounds loan from Cecil's mother. Cecil wanted the game to differ from popular Sierra games at the time, saying: "While I enjoyed Sierra games, I felt that there had to be more than yet again saving King Graham of Daventry from a – let’s be frank – fairly unlikely series of events. It was all a little bit twee. So we came up with the idea of writing an adventure game that did not take itself too seriously, but did have a serious story – something in-between Lucasarts and Sierra." The game was published by Virgin Interactive Entertainment.

Lure of the Temptress was the first game built with the Virtual Theatre engine, which allowed in-game characters to wander around the gameworld independently of each other, performing "every day life" actions, which had not previously been featured in a game. It was later used for Beneath a Steel Sky and the first two games in the Broken Sword series. The title cost between 20 and 30 thousand pounds.

On April 1, 2003, the game was released as freeware. The data files are available from the Revolution Software website for download and the game's engine has been added to ScummVM. This version of Lure of the Temptress was released on GOG.com on December 18, 2008.

== Reception ==
Reception

Review scores
Publication	Score
Amiga Format	92%
The One	90%
Mega Zone	92%
Amiga Power	88%

Upon its release, Lure of the Temptress was received favorably by critics, who praised the game's innovative controls and graphics, and compared it to Sierra and LucasFilm games. In 1993, Dragon gave the game 4 out of 5 stars. Computer Gaming World liked the game's sophisticated NPC interactions and how it prevented unwinnable situations, but criticized its short playing time. The magazine concluded that "Lure of the Temptress is a fine first release from this developer and bodes well for the future". Amiga Power ranked it at #47 in 1993, and at #66 in 1994, on their list of Amiga Power All-Time Top 100. In 2011, Wirtualna Polska ranked it as the 30th best Amiga game, saying it was "indeed a revolution" in the genre. It was also a commercial success, reaching number one in the British Gallup charts at the beginning of July 1992 and remaining in the Top 20 for most of the rest of the year.

Amiga Format stated that this "fine adventure game well worth investigating" could compete with Sierra and LucasFilm games; "in any event, Temptress surpasses almost anything Sierra have offered, by being larger, funnier, and a whole lot better drawn ... an innovative system knocks spots of the Sierra-standards and shows LucasFilm a thing or two" and also praised its humour, saying that there's "a good dose of tongue-in-cheek humour and fairy-tale nonsense." The One praised the game's controls, saying that "the game's impressive user-friendliness is undoubtably one of its strong points," adding that "Lure of the Temptress is every bit as professional and polished as anything the Americans and French have been able to offer us recently" but "Lure is, if anything, a little too serious and sombre" and that "LucasFilm's games boast the more interesting characters and interaction sequences." Amiga Power praised its graphics, saying they are "very pretty drawn, with the dark, moody look you'd expect from a town being oppressed by an evil Temptress," calling it "one of the best graphic adventures ever" that's "up there with Monkey Island 1 and Beneath a Steel Sky," and adding that the "only drawback is that it's shorter than your average adventure." Mega Zone praised the game, stating that it is a "Sierra/Lucasfilmish with really, really good playability. We're talking 32 colours graphics which look really nice, with playability which is really smooth, and simply pure gaming enjoyment here," adding that "the manual is very well written, the sound the graphics are all there, disc access is very good, and looking at the way the whole game is put together right down to the intro it's one of the most amazing Amiga Adventures every written! An Adventure Zone classic!" Stuart Campbell of Amiga Power opined that Core Design's rival 1992 fantasy adventure game Curse of Enchantia (also published by Virgin) was "a funny version of Lure of the Temptress with a different plot."

Adventure Classic Gaming was less positive in its retrospective review, stating "what makes Lure of the Temptress fun—but also annoying—is the game's unique gameplay engine" and that its graphics "unfortunately do not hold up well over the passage of time," but that many of the backgrounds are "quite beautiful" and summarizing by stating, "While far from being a dull game, Lure of the Temptress is also full of clichés and stagnant periods of gameplay which ultimately undermine the game's overall enjoyment."
