= Broken Sword: The Angel of Death =

2006 video game

- Developers: Revolution Software; Sumo Digital
- Publishers: EU/AU: THQ; NA: DreamCatcher
- Director: Charles Cecil
- Producer: Gary Edwards
- Designers: Charles Cecil; Neil Richards; Ross Hartshorn; Nana Louise Nielsen
- Programmers: Tom Sedden; Paul Porter
- Artist: Dominic Hood
- Composer: Ben McCullough
- Series: Broken Sword
- Platform: Microsoft Windows
- Release: EU: 15 September 2006; AU: 21 September 2006; NA: 13 February 2007
- Genre: Point-and-click adventure
- Mode: Single-player

Broken Sword: The Angel of Death (Secrets of the Ark: A Broken Sword Game in North America) is a 3D point-and-click adventure game developed by Revolution Software and Sumo Digital, which was released in 2006 in Europe and Australia and in 2007 in North America. It is the fourth iteration of the Broken Sword series, following 2003's Broken Sword: The Sleeping Dragon. Being released only on Windows, it is the only game in the series not to be released on any console. The player assumes the role of George Stobbart, an American patent lawyer, as he and Anna Maria, a girl with an old manuscript, search for a great treasure that the manuscript leads them to. The game uses a point and click interface, though George's moves can be controlled using a keyboard.

Revolution Software and THQ announced The Angel of Death in August 2005. According to game director Charles Cecil, after the release of The Sleeping Dragon, the demand from fans for a sequel was overwhelming. Though The Sleeping Dragon benefited commercially from being released on console as well as Windows, it was held back by the constraints of the console versions. As a result, The Angel of Death was written for Windows only. As a series' first, it was co-developed by Revolution and Sumo Digital instead of having Revolution as the sole developer. It uses Sumo's Emmersion engine and was the first game to use the amBX lighting technology.

The game has received mostly positive reviews, with critics praising it as a fine example in the adventure gaming genre. While most critics agreed the game addressed many flaws in The Sleeping Dragon, it has also received some criticism, particularly for its rushed ending and poor controls.

== Gameplay ==
Broken Sword: The Angel of Death uses both a point and click and direct control interface. The player guides George Stobbart's movements with a mouse or keyboard, and Nicole Collard is also a playable character in selected portions of the game. George must collect objects that can be used with other collectible objects, parts of the scenery, or other people in the game world to solve puzzles and progress in the game. George can engage in dialogue with other characters through conversation trees to gain hints of what needs to be done to solve the puzzles or to progress the plot. As in the first three Broken Sword games, the death of the player character is possible in The Angel of Death.

== Plot ==
George in a salami store in the meat packing factory. The bottom of the screen displays "subject icons" which command George what to talk about.

After the events in The Sleeping Dragon, George Stobbart is running a bail bonds office in New York with his partner Virgil. George meets Anna Maria, a girl with an old manuscript who wants his help to decode it. A group of mobsters after the manuscript ransack Anna Maria's hotel room, as well as George's bail bonds office, and steal the manuscript. George discovers that the mobsters are led by Fingers Martino, who runs an old meat packing factory. George sneaks into the factory and overhears a conversation between Fingers and Mr. Spallaci, who has obtained the manuscript. George manages to covertly take back the manuscript, which he examines with Anna Maria. George figures out that the fortified city on it must be Istanbul.

In the Pasha Palace hotel in Istanbul, a waiter named Mevlut informs George about a citadel that is located beneath the Topkapi Palace. George and Anna Maria enter the palace and its catacombs where they find a golden cherub; they take it back to the hotel. After a romantic night with Anna Maria, George wakes up without her, and Mevlut comes in armed with a gun. George is locked up in a cell, as he is suspected to be a terrorist. In his cell, George gets a visit from Father Nicolas and Sister Immaculata, who says that he should meet her on the roof. George escapes from the cell and meets with Immaculata, who turns out to be Nicole "Nico" Collard (his companion in previous installments). They return to the hotel, where George finds out Anna Maria has an apartment in Rome. In Rome, in front of Anna Maria's apartment building, George meets Brother Mark. After George figures out how to enter the building, Mark is not willing to give him a package that has arrived for Anna Maria. Inside her apartment, he finds a photo of Anna Maria who, dressed as a nun, is standing in front of a Vatican wall. Another clue mentions a place near the Vatican, and he also discovers an airline ticket to Phoenix, Arizona.

At a monastery in the Vatican, George covertly enters a wafer factory and finds Anna Maria's file in an office. After George is discovered and is being escorted outside by Cardinal Gianelli, Father Gregor tells him that Anna Maria used to work there, but that she has stolen a manuscript, and he hands over his business card. By showing the card to Mark, he is willing to help and gives George Anna Maria's package. From Mark, he learns about the Black Cat club. The package contains a DVD with an interview with a man called Maynard, who has managed to make "monatomic gold". Nico leaves to Phoenix to check things out. George gains access to the Black Cat club, where he meets Duane (who he has met before in previous installments). Duane reveals that Spallaci owns the club. Afterwards, George is caught for stealing a towel and tied to a chair. Spallaci interrogates him about Anna Maria, and he overhears the recorded voice of Nico. Shots are being fired, so he thinks Nico has been killed. When he finds a way to escape, he goes for a drink, trying to forget the loss of Nico. The next day, still drunk, he arrives at Anna Maria's apartment, where Nico returns and George faints.

In a flashback scene, Nico explores an old facility in Phoenix, where she is confronted by Spallaci's men, but is saved by Maynard. However, Maynard dies after he gets locked in the centrifuge, and Nico manages to escape by tricking Spallaci's men. Back in Rome, Nico informs George that the monatomic gold is being used to build a weapon called the Ark. They return to the monastery and witness Father Gregor shoot Gianelli; Nico is taken away and George is knocked out. When he awakens, the dying Gianelli hands over a manuscript in Latin, and tells him that the Ark's purpose is to use the monatomic gold to destroy the unbelievers. George goes to rescue Nico and meets Anna Maria in the catacombs, who tells him her side of the story and that the Ark needs a human interface to be activated, in order to be sacrificed and summon an "Angel of Death" who exterminates the unbelievers. George arrives at the ceremony to see Nico chained to the Ark, ready to become the new Angel of Death. Mevlut, who is in fact ex-Turkish security and only pretended to be a waiter and priest, enters the scene armed with a gun, but Anna Maria points her gun at him as well. George succeeds in stopping the ceremony in time and frees Nico, but Anna Maria and Mevlut shoot each other and die.

== Development ==
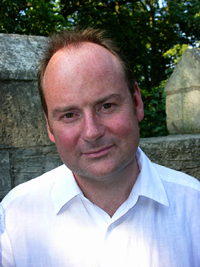
Charles Cecil was the game's director.

Revolution Software and THQ announced Broken Sword: The Angel of Death on 17 August 2005. According to Charles Cecil, the Broken Sword series was originally planned to be a trilogy, but that after the release of Broken Sword: The Sleeping Dragon, the demand from fans for a sequel was overwhelming. Though The Sleeping Dragon benefited commercially from being released on console as well as Windows, this approach required certain development compromises as the PC version, with its superior graphics and processing power, was held back by the constraints of the console versions. As a result, Revolution agreed with THQ to write The Angel of Death for Windows only "so as to really push the boundaries in terms of the technology and graphics."

The Angel of Death was co-developed by Revolution and Sumo Digital, as opposed to the other games in the Broken Sword series, which had Revolution as the sole game developer. Cecil believed that because of the requirement for ever larger development team sizes, it was no longer possible to maintain a large team to write single, original titles. As a result, Revolution concentrated on design, while Sumo concentrated on production. The game uses Sumo's Emmersion engine. It was the first game to use the amBX lighting technology.

Broken Sword: The Sleeping Dragon was criticized for featuring a high number of action elements, which aimed to put the player under pressure. While Cecil still stood behind this principle, he thought the action elements were not the right approach. The Sleeping Dragon was also criticized for using a high number of crate puzzles. As a result, Cecil reduced the number of them in The Angel of Death. The music in the game was composed by Ben McCullough and features tracks by Übernoise. While Rolf Saxon returns to voice George Stobbart, Nicole "Nico" Collard was this time played by Katherine Pageon, making this the first time Nico was voiced by a native French speaker. The rest of the credited voice actors were Regina Regan, Toby Longsworth, Bob Golding, Wayne Forester, Andrew Secombe, Tasmin Heatley and Alison Pettitt.

The Angel of Death was released in Europe on 15 September 2006 and in Australia on 21 September 2006. It was released in North America on 13 February 2007 as Secrets of the Ark: A Broken Sword Game. The game may be purchased from GOG.com, and is also a part of the Broken Sword Complete package from Mastertronic. As a series' first, the game's soundtrack, Broken Sword: The Angel of Death: Soundtrack to the Video Game, was released on the iTunes Store on 12 September 2006.

== Reception ==
Reception

Aggregate score
| Aggregator | Score |
|---|---|
| Metacritic | 73/100 |

Review scores
| Publication | Score |
|---|---|
| Eurogamer | 7/10 |
| PC Zone | 7.8/10 |
| Adventure Classic Gaming | 5/5 |

The Angel of Death received mostly positive reviews from critics. At Metacritic, which assigns a rating out of 100 to reviews from critics, the game received an average score of 73 based on 31 reviews, which indicates "mixed or average reviews".

PC Zone said: "It's hard, its opening acts don't match the quality of those which follow and some characters grate—but as a modern rendition of a traditional formula, The Angel Of Death has both pointed and clicked wisely. It's another nail out of the adventure gaming coffin—although admittedly quite a few remain". Adventure Classic Gaming wrote: "Not only the game succeeds in addressing many of the flaws in Broken Sword: The Sleeping Dragon that have plagued the previous title, this sequel is able to surpass the high standard and expectation set forth by past games in the series to create yet another chapter in the legend of the Knights Templar". Eurogamer said: "As an example of classic, back to basics point and click adventuring, there can perhaps be no finer recent example in the genre than The Angel of Death—it's a nailed-down must-buy if you're an adventure diehard who plays every one".
