= Jarek Kolář =

Czech video game designer and producer (born 1977)

- Born: Jaroslav Kolář; 8 November 1977 (age 48); Czechoslovakia
- Occupations: Game designer, Game producer
- Years active: 1993-present
- Known for: Vietcong

Jaroslav Kolář (born November 8, 1977) is a Czech video game designer and producer.

In the early 1990s, he enjoyed playing LucasArts adventure games, especially Indy III and Monkey Island I. While studying at the secondary school Gymnázium Slovanské náměstí in Brno, he met programmer Petr Vlček and they together created a parody of Monkey Island where Guybrush (transcribed as Gájbraš) had to escape from an island inhabited by donkeys. His opponent was LeGek, a brother of LeChuck (with reference to the book Chuk and Gek by Arkady Gaidar about the adventures of brothers Chuk and Gek in "the great and happy country named Soviet Union", a compulsory reading for school children in communist Czechoslovakia).

Petr Vlček at the time only had an Atari 800 and therefore developed the game editor and engine at school. Jarek drew the locations and wrote the plot. While on a school trip to Polička, Jarek decided to skip a lunch with his classmates and instead went to find the panelák where entrepreneur Petr Vochozka lived at the time. Two weeks later, Vochozka saw their demo and agreed to produce and distribute the game. The Secret of Donkey Island, released in June 1994 after two years of development, is considered the first Czech commercially successful point-and-click graphical adventure. In the following months Petr Vlček and Jarek Kolář created an adventure game called Seven Days and Seven Nights, based on a story about a womanizer written by Petr Vochozka for a semi-developed Amiga game.

After working for a while for German game development companies, Jarek Kolář and programmer Michal Janáček founded the company PTERODON, s.r.o. in October 1997. In May 1998 they started development of a new 3D game, released in 2000 as Flying Heroes. Thanks to Petr Vochozka, who in 1997 founded with Jan Kudera Illusion Softworks, Hidden & Dangerous was successfully released in 1999, and was followed by Flying Heroes in 2000. Both were distributed by Take-Two Interactive.

Pterodon closely cooperated with Illusion Softworks; their teams shared one open space in an administrative building in Brno. Jarek was lead designer of the tactical first-person shooter Vietcong, released by Pterodon/IS in 2003. One of the last released games Jarek contributed to is Mafia II (senior gameplay producer).

Kolář later joined newly formed Hangar 13 and contributed to Mafia III until he returned to the Czech Republic and joined Bohemia Interactive. He also worked on a story for Dead Effect and Dead Effect 2. He currently works for BadFly Interactive.

== List of games ==
- 1994 - The Secret of Donkey Island
- 1994 - 7 days and 7 nights
- 1997 - Akte Europa
- 1998 - Hesperian Wars
- 2000 - Flying Heroes
- 2001 - Loco-Commotion
- 2003 - Vietcong
- 2005 - Vietcong 2
- 2010 - Mafia II
- 2013 - Dead Effect
- 2015 - Dead Effect 2
- 2016 - Mafia III
- 2017 - Argo
- 2019 - Vigor
- 2023 - Crime Boss: Rockay City
