= Tom Clancy's Rainbow Six: Shadow Vanguard =

2011 video game

- Developer: Gameloft
- Publisher: Gameloft
- Producers: Jean-Claude Labelle; Artem Nabatov
- Designers: Stanislas Dewavrin; Dmitriy Tarabanov
- Artists: Arthur Hugot; Gennady Teplenko
- Composer: Paul Haslinger
- Series: Tom Clancy's Rainbow Six
- Platforms: iOS, Xperia Play, Android
- Release: iOS: WW: March 17, 2011; Xperia Play: WW: June 27, 2011; Android: WW: February 4, 2012
- Genre: First-person shooter
- Modes: Single-player, multiplayer

Tom Clancy's Rainbow Six: Shadow Vanguard is a 2011 first-person shooter video game developed and published by Gameloft for iOS, Xperia Play and Android devices. The game is a remake of the original Tom Clancy's Rainbow Six video game.

The game was removed from all digital stores a few years later.

== Gameplay ==
The tagging system in Shadow Vanguard; the two red marks indicate enemies that have been tagged and will be killed immediately by the computer controlled allies upon entering the room.

The game features three modes of play: a single-player campaign, an online co-op mode using the same levels as the single-player mode and an online deathmatch mode. The co-op and deathmatch modes can be played through both a local connection via Wi-Fi and Bluetooth or through a global connection via the internet. The single-player campaign contains thirteen missions. The online deathmatch mode contains five maps, based on levels in the single-player campaign.

The basic control scheme in Shadow Vanguard is similar to other first-person shooters from Gameloft, such as the Modern Combat or N.O.V.A. series. The game is controlled using virtual buttons on-screen; a virtual control stick on the left of the screen is used for movement, while aiming is achieved by swiping on the touchscreen. Gyroscopic controls are featured on the iPhone 4, fourth generation iPod Touch and certain Android devices. The player can also crouch, throw grenades, use their weapon's iron sights, reload, change weapons, pick up different weapons, knife enemies, mantle obstacles, sprint, and shoot using buttons and prompts on the touchscreen.

The game is more focused on tactical gameplay than standard shooter video games. A major component of the game is identifying and tagging enemies inside rooms before entering the room. The player can use a fiberscope to look through the door of room, and tag two enemies. Then, when the door is opened (either by kicking or by throwing in a smoke grenade), the two NPCs in the player's squad will immediately target the tagged enemies. This facilitates a more tactical approach to the game than in other Gameloft shooters, such as Modern Combat.

Every mission in the single-player/co-op mode has a primary and a secondary objective. Whilst the primary objective must be completed to finish the mission, the secondary objectives are optional, although completing them earns the player more experience points at the end of the level. Experience points are also awarded for each enemy killed (with extra points for headshots), for keeping teammates safe and for making it through a level without raising an alarm. Gaining points increases the player's rank, which in turn unlocks new weapons and equipment.

There are four levels of difficulty in single-player and co-op modes; "Recruit", "Operative", "Elite" and "Rainbow Six"

== Plot ==
This game is set in 2012, shortly after the formation of the multinational counter-terrorism unit, Team Rainbow, which is composed of elite soldiers from various NATO countries. The game's protagonist is Cpt. Federico 'Fed' Gonzalez, an ex-U.S. Special Forces officer, who is recruited by the Acting Director of Rainbow, James Danko, who teams Gonzalez with Sgt. Hae Jun Kim and Sgt. Paul Akindele.

Soon after his recruitment, Gonzalez finds his team responding to a series of terrorist attacks by the Phoenix Group, a radical eco-terrorist organization. As Rainbow investigates Phoenix, they are assisted and advised by John Brightling, chairman of the powerful biotechnology corporation Infinario Inc. Ultimately, however, Rainbow discovers that the Phoenix Group is actually a front for Infinario itself, and Brightling is the man behind the terrorist attacks. He is developing a highly contagious strain of the Ebola virus, called "Shiva". In an effort to protect nature, Brightling's plan is to kill every human being on the planet, except those who he allows to reside inside a safe artificial biosphere, the Horizon Ark. Once the human race has been wiped out, Brightling and his followers plan to repopulate the earth and build an environmentally-friendly utopia.

To achieve this goal, he uses the scattered terrorist attacks of the Phoenix Group to create a worldwide paranoia about international terrorism, which he then exploits in order to get a security contract for his own private security firm at the Olympic Games, where he plans to release the virus. Team Rainbow succeed in preventing the release of the virus, however, forcing Brightling and his collaborators to retreat to the Horizon Ark. Rainbow infiltrates the facility, killing all of Brightling's collaborators and eventually capturing Brightling himself.

== Reception ==
Reception

Aggregate score
Aggregator	Score
Metacritic	76/100

Review scores
Publication	Score
IGN	6.5/10
MacLife	4/5
Pocket Gamer	6/10
TouchArcade	3.5/5
148Apps	4.5/5
AppSpy	5/5
Slide to Play	4/4
TouchGen	3.5/5

Shadow Vanguard was met with mainly positive reviews. The iOS version holds a score of 76 out of 100 at Metacritic based on 17 reviews.

Pocket Gamer's Tracy Erickson was not overly impressed, scoring the game 6 out of 10, and arguing that "Laggy multiplayer, unpolished single-player missions, and various minor flaws prevent it from shooting straight [...] No one flaw is at the heart of this underwhelming game - several issues contribute to a general lack of polish and attention to detail. It's playable, though not particularly enthralling." IGN's Levi Buchanan was also critical, giving the game a 6.5 out of 10 and comparing it unfavorably to Modern Combat 2: Black Pegasus and N.O.V.A. 2: The Hero Rises Again. He was especially critical of the control layout, arguing that there are too many on-screen buttons. He concluded that "Shadow Vanguard is a decent tactical shooter with a variety of missions and good graphics. But the cluttered controls and odd intelligence of both enemies and teammates throws a little cold water on the game.

TouchGen's Jose Ramos scored the game 3.5 out of 5. He too felt the screen was too cluttered, and also criticized deathmatch mode, especially spawning after the player dies, as the game randomly spawns the character on the map, possibly right next to an enemy. Of multiplayer mode he said, "overall then, and for the most part, even with its flaws, it still adheres to its Rainbow Six roots. It can be hard to master, and what Rainbow Six game isn't?, but once you get into a few multi-player bouts you'll get a good and solid multi-player experience, it's just not quite great." He also praised single-player mode but concluded that "unfortunately, the game is hampered by the control issues, and for that reason, unless you really must have some team based play in your FPS, then you may want to look at other App Store FPSs for your counter terrorism fix." MacLife's Chris Barylick scored the game 4 out of 5. He also felt the screen was too cluttered, but he praised the graphics and voice acting. He was particularly complimentary of the gameplay; "Like other Rainbow Six games, this has a fun sense of palpable tension, in that you know your characters are fragile and can't laugh off multiple bullet and grenade rounds."

Jennifer Allen of 148Apps was more impressed, scoring the game 4.5 out of 5 and arguing that it was a better game then SOCOM U.S. Navy SEALs: Fireteam Bravo 3 on the PlayStation Portable. She praised the graphics, sound and multiplayer modes, although she too felt there were too many on-screen buttons. She was particularly impressed with the tactical gameplay, calling it "the most complete tactical shooter I've ever played on a handheld device [...] It's a pretty ideal tactical shooting experience." TouchArcade's Jared Nelson also scored the game 3.5 out of 5. He was critical of online multiplayer, but overall felt that "Rainbow Six: Shadow Vanguard is a competent FPS that's in line with Gameloft's previous offerings, and should satisfy fans of the series' recent console titles looking for a fix on the go."

AppSpy's Andrew Nesvadba was even more impressed, scoring the game 5 out of 5. He criticized the AI of both team members and enemies, but concluded that "Shadow Vanguard is without a doubt an easy game to recommend to FPS fans and while the tactical style can be a bit more demanding than traditional shooters, casual gamers should find the controls easy to master as well." Slide to Play's Chris Reed also gave the game a perfect score (4 out of 4), arguing that "overall, we had loads of fun with Shadow Vanguard. Sure, it's not all that different from the N.O.V.A.s or the Modern Combats, and it would be nice to see Gameloft stretch themselves a little more in a future FPS. But no other company out there makes iPhone FPSes as big or exciting as Gameloft. If you want a tactical shooter in your pocket, you've come to the right place."
