= Léto s Oskarem =

1998 video game

- Developer: Illusion Softworks
- Publisher: Vochozka Trading
- Release: 1998
- Genre: Adventure game

Léto s Oskarem (English: Summer with Oscar) is a 1998 Czech adventure game authored by Pavel Širůček and distributed by Vochozka Trading.

== Production ==
Two friends, Petr Vochozka and Jan Kudera, decided to set up a gaming studio in Brno, which they named Illusion Softworks. Their first game was a platform game called Lurid Land. Their second title, Léto s Oskarem, was the last game Vochozka Trading made, afterwards most of their staff went to work for Illusion Softworks. While the game was released in 1998, it was originally meant to be released sooner; Excalibur argued the delay was due to the developers promising many features and benefits never-before-seen in adventure gaming, a claim the magazine argued was never fulfilled. Databaze-her notes the title was " postponed several times and many of the previously announced improvements were not implemented in ".

The team were inspired to continue the tone set in earlier humor-focused games from Vochozka such as 7 days and 7 nights. The game was developed primarily for MS-DOS and ran in a VGA resolution of 640×480, later they began working on a Windows version as the game developed; these floppy disk versions came without sound, while a later CD-ROM edition had full dubbing. The game contained background music but no sound. According to an interview with the author of the game Pavel Širůček for Score magazine, the initial sketches of the game were made by Tomáš Svoboda on paper, which was subsequently scanned into a computer.

The development team was four-person strong. Pavel Širůček was author and creative director. Sounds and music provided by Pavel Olšanský. The graphic designer was Tomáš Svoboda, who also created the comic book in the enclosed manual; he also contributed to the previous game Hidden & Dangerous 1, and would later work for Pterodon. Programming of the game itself led by Petr Bělík. The characters are performed by professional actors from the Goose on a String Theater (Husa na provázku) - 1998 was the year ullt professional dubbing hit Czech adventure gaming.

Léto s Oskarem was one of the few titles Petr Vochozka developed in his own office, his main business was in publishing games created by other developers and localising Polish games.

== Plot and gameplay ==
In this "a typical Czech comedy" adventure, the player takes control of Oskar Sláma, who is so bad at school that his parents send him off to live with his grandparents in a rural village of Kotěhůlkách. He reluctantly accepts in order to receive his inheritance.

The game is a classic point and click adventure game. The inventory is located in the top part of the screen. The dialogue screen offers three ways for the player to react: charming, rude, or altruistic. The humour is in the vein of Leisure Suit Larry. The game is very short, and contains many animations. It contained background music but no sound effects. The game contains eight locations, 80 game screens, and around 30 characters. Each clickable element has a humorous note attached. The game has an average of 5 animations per screen, including animations triggered from prolonged inactivity and those independent to player's actions.

== Reception ==
Bonusweb.cz felt the game was "ever-stagnant". Excalibur noted that the game is obscure when compared to contemporary Czech adventures, and was less commercially successful. In addition, the magazine argues it's one of the less difficult Czech adventures, and that the game contains outdated humour on groups such as women and homosexuals. Excalibur thought the game was a failure due to failing to deliver on their promised features and for being graphically outdated at the time of release. Databaze-her thought the game was "characterized by lower difficulty and certain technological obsolescence". Vision Game deemed Oskat Slama a mixture of America's Leisure Suit Larry and Polish character Agent Mlíčňák. Shark felt the game was a "total flop". Gamifique argued that the game was Petr Vochozka's way of supporting Czech production.

Tiscali notes that 1998 was a significant year for the Czech game scene as the year Polda, Horké léto, Léto s Oskarem, and Brány Skeldalu were released. Level felt the game's graphic design was "at the level of games several years old, and concluded: "It is a typical Czech product, created with an idea and taste, it just wanted better crayons and probably a bigger investment". Various magazines compared Horke Leto to this title, due to them coming out at a similar time and having similar themes; they however would favour Horke Leto, with Score commenting that the game was "a good plaster for wounds caused by Léto s Oscarem [sic]". Bonusweb felt it was a "pity" the title was released in an unfinished state. Doupe felt the game was a cult classic, still enjoyed and fondly remembered by many players. Vizuálny štýl českých a slovenských adventúr medzi rokmi 1990 až 1999 felt that while the game often goes for visual realism, it sometimes slips into cartoony graphics in the style of 7 dní a 7 nocí, and noted that the game mechanics were far from the quality of foreign titles such as Broken Sword 2 (1997) or Monkey Island 3 (1997).
