= Modern Combat 3: Fallen Nation =

2011 video game

- Developer: Gameloft Montreal
- Publisher: Gameloft
- Producers: Arnaud Bonnard; Charles Ayotte
- Designers: Stanislas Dewavrin; Alexandre Charbonneau
- Artists: Arthur Hugot; Christophe Latour
- Composer: Arnaud Galland
- Series: Modern Combat
- Platforms: iOS, Android, Bada 2.0, BlackBerry PlayBook
- Release: iOS; October 27, 2011; Android; December 19, 2011; Bada; June 7, 2012; BlackBerry PlayBook; August 31, 2012
- Genre: First-person shooter
- Modes: Single-player, multiplayer

Modern Combat 3: Fallen Nation is a 2011 first-person shooter developed and published by Gameloft Montreal for iOS, Android, Bada 2.0 and BlackBerry PlayBook devices. It is the third game in the Modern Combat series, and is a sequel to 2009's Modern Combat: Sandstorm and 2010's Modern Combat 2: Black Pegasus. The fourth part of the series, Modern Combat 4: Zero Hour, was released in 2012, and the fifth, Modern Combat 5: Blackout, in 2014. The game is set in 2028 where North Korea, Russia and Pakistan join forces to invade the United States of America, thus causing a global war.

== Gameplay ==
The gameplay in Fallen Nation is similar to the previous Modern Combat games, and also similar to Call of Duty 4: Modern Warfare and Call of Duty: Modern Warfare 2. The game's single player mode takes place over thirteen levels, in locales such as Hollywood, Alaska, and the Middle East. The player assumes the roles of Corporal James Walker, Master Sergeant Carter and Sergeant Anderson (one of the protagonists from Black Pegasus)

The game is controlled using virtual buttons on-screen; a virtual control stick on the left of the screen is used for movement, while aiming is achieved by swiping on the touchscreen. Gyroscopic controls are featured on the iPhone 4, fourth generation iPod Touch and certain Android devices. The player can also crouch, throw grenades, use their weapon's iron sights, reload, change weapon, pick up different weapons, knife enemies, mantle obstacles, and shoot using buttons and prompts on the touchscreen. All controls can be customized from the main menu. The single-player campaign also includes Quick time events.

=== Multiplayer ===
A Modern Combat 3 screenshot showing a capture the flag multiplayer game.

As with both of the previous games, Fallen Nation features a multiplayer mode, although the number of players has increased to twelve (from Sandstorm's six and Black Pegasus' ten). Six different maps and eight different game modes are available; "Battle", "Team battle", "Capture the flag", "Zone control", "Manhunt", "Bomb squad", "Destruction" and "Team Manhunt". Killing enemies and securing objectives earns experience points, allowing players to level up through 90 ranks. Once a player has reached rank 90, they can obtain a Veteran Symbol. They then have the choice of resetting their rank to rank 1 without losing any purchased items.

On June 7, an update was released, adding a new game mode ("Team Manhunt"), two new maps ("Warehouse" and "Rapture"), a new perk ("Stealth"), and new equipment to lessen the damage players take.

== Plot ==
In the backstory to the game, terrorists from North Korea, Pakistan and Russia have formed an alliance called the K.P.R. Alliance. Led by General Popovich (a supporting antagonist from Black Pegasus), K.P.R. have declared war on the United States. After defeating the US defense apparatus, K.P.R. invaded US territory and deployed several WMDs in US cities.

The game begins in Los Angeles, as Corporal James Walker infiltrates the NSA building with Privates Colt and Kelly in order to secure important intel from the servers. After fighting through a few K.P.R. personnel, the three successfully complete their mission. However, Colt and Kelly are killed prior to extraction, and their vehicle is destroyed. After Walker escapes the ambush, he travels to the lobby, where he meets up with Captain Turner and his men. Upon arriving however, the group comes under heavy fire, and the building collapses. Despite this, Walker survives, and he and Turner are able to force their way to the extraction point.

The story then switches to the perspective of Master Sergeant Carter, who is aboard an AC-130 gunship. He is tasked with providing cover fire from the skies, allowing fire-teams to destroy bridges around the city. Ultimately, his crew succeeds, preventing K.P.R. troops from moving into new territory.

During a mission to destroy anti-aircraft batteries in Hollywood Hills, Turner is killed in action, and Walker is contacted by Sergeant Downs (a major NPC in Black Pegasus) and enlisted into the special ops group "Phantom Unit". Walker and Downs are then sent on a mission to the Alaskan wilderness to locate the members of "Razor Squad", who had gone MIA, and determine the enemy's plan of attack. In Alaska, they locate the survivors of Razor Squad and escape on an off-road truck. Anderson, alongside Corporal Washington joins the unit, and they are deployed to the Yongwang, a K.P.R. warship located in the Bering Strait. Phantom Unit eliminates Sung, the captain, and discovers next-generation stealth fighters, which they use to escape. Later, they infiltrate a weapons factory in Siberia, and destroy K.P.R.'s supply of munitions and ordnance.

The team then heads to Pakistan to hunt down Edward Page, a former Green Beret who has joined the K.P.R. Alliance. During the mission, Carter and Corporal Washington (the fourth member of Phantom Unit) are wounded, but Page is successfully captured. He reveals that General Tong, a high-ranking member of K.P.R. is planning to bomb America from North Korea. Phantom Unit attacks a North Korean airfield, under orders to prevent Tong from initiating the attack. However, during the assault, Walker and Anderson are captured and held prisoner by Tong himself. Seconds before their unceremonious execution, Anderson manages to escape and release Walker, who then kills Tong.

The unit is then sent to infiltrate Kijang, a K.P.R. village used to store WMDs. During the raid, Popovitch manages to capture Downs and Walker. The last thing they are told before they are knocked unconscious is that they have failed and their efforts will prove fruitless as nuclear missiles are to be launched at the US. After being locked up, Downs and Walker manage to escape their cells. Popovitch flees, but Walker and Downs are able to disarm two of three nuclear missiles. Upon reaching the third missile however, they discover Popovitch had changed the launch codes. With no other choice, they plant C-4 explosives on the missile and head after Popovich, in what seemed to be a suicide mission. Upon reaching him, the missile explodes, killing all of Popovich's guards, and incapacitating Walker. Moments later, Walker awakens to find Popovitch beating a near-unconscious Downs. Despite being dazed by the explosion, Walker manages to push Popovitch onto a sharp pipe, and stabs him in the neck before Popovich shoots him. The game concludes as an extraction helicopter arrives, and Downs muses, "What kind of booze do you think they sell here?"

After this, an epilogue shows the US taken back from the K.P.R. forces, city block by city block. However, it is then revealed that Edward Page is free, and an audio recording is played in which he states, "You have no idea how far I'm willing to go."

== Weapons ==
Whereas Sandstorm featured seven weapons, and Black Pegasus featured fifteen, Fallen Nation features twenty-one, in addition to throwing knives, five different grenades, seven pieces of equipment and seven "perks". Weapons can also be fitted with attachments like red dot sights or silencers.

Unlike in Sandstorm and Black Pegasus which featured predominantly real world weaponry, the weapons in Fallen Nation are fictional, but are based on real world counterparts.

Weapons include a Bravel-1 (based on the SCAR-H), an MC81 (MP7), an Intercept-L200 (CheyTac Intervention), an ACM (Adaptive Combat Rifle), a Shred-4 (MG4), an OPS55 (UMP-40), a KT-44 (AK-47), a Maiden (FAMAS), a TXR-Reaper (TDI Vector), a TZ4-Compakt (M4 carbine), a KR600 (GM6 Lynx), an Automat-X (AUG HBAR) and a ZN6-Prototype (XM8).

== AirPlay ==
A new feature introduced in the iPad version of Fallen Nation is "AirPlay", a mirroring function which utilizes dual-screen gaming on an HDTV in 1080p. The system allows players to connect their iPad to a TV whilst still using the iPad to control the game, as the control panel remains visible on the iPad screen. TouchGen's Nigel Wood said of AirPlay, "It's a cool feature, but one that I feel is nothing but a gimmick. It's not easy to play this way, as you will often find yourself looking down at the screen to find the right buttons, due to the lack of tactile feedback."

== Reception ==
Reception

Aggregate score
Aggregator	Score
Metacritic	88/100

Review scores
Publication	Score
GamesMaster	83%
Gamezebo	60/100
IGN	8.5/10
Jeuxvideo.com	16/20
MacLife	5/5
Pocket Gamer	(iOS) 3.5/5 (Android) 3/5
TouchArcade	4.5/5
Common Sense Media	4/5

As with both Sandstorm and Black Pegasus, the iOS version of Fallen Nation received generally favorable reviews, just two points shy of "universal acclaim", according to the review aggregation website Metacritic.

IGN's Justin Davis called it "a huge, intense, and polished shooter. Modern Combat 3 is the best FPS on mobile devices." Rob Rich of 148Apps said, "Modern Combat 3 looks great, no question, but it's the smaller details like animations and the occasional slow motion kill shot that really draw the eye. But really, I think the reason I've enjoyed my time with the game so much is because it's just so...enjoyable. The over-the-top set piece moments are surprisingly grand for a handheld device and the multiplayer, with its experienced earned currency-driven weapon unlocks and customizations is excellent." Pocket Gamer's Will Wilson accused the iOS version of a "lack of maturity", criticizing certain aspects of the design and saying, "there are the unintentionally hilarious moments that keep cropping up, like when your AI companion keeps shouting the wrong squad name during the Alaskan levels, or when he 'drags' you to safety by slightly moving your arm. These give the game an unwelcome knock-off quality." However, he praised the general gameplay, arguing that "in terms of single-player, MC3 gets far closer to Call of Duty than previous efforts, thanks to what feels like an almost relentless series of set-pieces. Buildings caving in on top of your character, tanks bursting through walls, and helicopters swooping to take you down are all present, and the game does a good job of stringing these together." Overall, he felt the good points of the game outweighed the bad, but only just, saying, "as long as your expectations aren't set too high, Modern Combat 3 is a fine addition to your iOS library [...] However, it's still a game of compromises. It still asks you to ignore the awful AI, clumsy level design, and awkward touchscreen controls."

Slide to Play's Chris Reed was more impressed, concluding that "Modern Combat 3 is a gorgeous, adrenaline rush of a game that capably answers the (mobile) call of duty." TouchArcade's Troy Woodfield argued that "if you want to play first person shooters on your iOS device, Modern Combat 3: Fallen Nation is a must-buy game." TouchGen's Nigel Wood was equally impressed, calling it "unmissable" and praising many elements. He called the single player campaign "the best single player FPS experience on iOS to date." He also praised the graphics ("the most accomplished iOS game at pulling off a real world experience so far. Props to the great blur effects when you run and turn. Sure, it may not boast the best textures, lighting or animation, but as an overall package it all comes together beautifully") and the multiplayer ("Modern Combat's multiplayer is more than good, it's excellent. Part of what makes it so great is its depth. First off, you've got 100 ranks to reach and a huge range of weapons to unlock as you level up through your kills. That alone is going to keep you busy for many, many months. But each weapon also has multiple attachments [...] You've also got challenges that charge you with achieving specific actions that span each weapon, in-game behaviour, attachments and game modes. Challenges like gain 20 kills with a certain gun, complete 50 revenge kills (killing the person who just killed you). And that's not all. Once you've unlocked a few of the heavy hitting guns, you can customise your weapon load outs. For the first time on iOS, kill chain rewards make an appearance so you can blow the entire map to kingdom come once you've whacked 20 players in a row."
