= Mise Quadam =

1995 video game

- Developer: Agawa
- Publisher: JRC Interactive
- Programmer: Petr Bartáček
- Artist: Jan Císař
- Writers: Hedvika Hájková; Petr Mandík
- Composer: Petr Bartáček
- Platform: MS-DOS
- Release: 1995
- Genre: Adventure
- Mode: Single-player

Mise Quadam (English: Mission Quadam) is a 1995 adventure game developed by Agawa and published by JRC Interactive for MS-DOS. Although the game is not a direct adaptation, the plot is inspired by some of the first twenty works of the West German science fiction novel series Perry Rhodan.

== Plot ==
In the year 2360, androids have killed all humans on planet Earth and now they plan to destroy all the vegetation using an element called Cybertrone. A small group of human scientists have hidden on Matna Plus, on planetoid between Mars and Jupiter. They want to destroy androids with the sodogomorator, a technology invented by an already extinct civilization on the moon Quadam. Willfram Kyrr and Eric Levassor flew on the moon as part of their first mission, but they fell silent after a few weeks. The main character is David Criggs, who flies the last far-reaching rocket to the Quadam, where his task is to find out what happened to the first crew, find the control center and launch the sodomorator.

== Gameplay ==
Mission Quadam is a point-and-click adventure based around exploration, conversations and puzzles. The game has many pixel hunting puzzles. The inventory is located at the bottom of the screen. The gameplay is wholly controlled via the mouse and the player uses single click commands.

== Development ==
The game was developed by Petr Mandík and Petr Bartáček's company Agawa, which was devoted to games with sci-fi themes. Having met at work through their shared education field, Bartáček became acquainted with Mandík's game Mavlin: Vesmírný únik and was impressed by its gaming engine, and saw the potential of making better games. The graphics were created by an external graphic artist who drew pictures directly onto paper. Mandík and Bartáček subsequently scanned the images into the computers and gave them animations.

Agawa released two games, both in the adventure genre: Mise Quadami (1995) and Swigridova kletba (1996). The company worked on two other adventure games: Orientální dobrodružství and MMA, both due for release in 1998, but their release was cancelled, and a year later the company was disbanded. By this time, Orientální dobrodružství already had completed graphics, and the game engineers were preparing to use Swigridova kletba's game engine, which required major changes to be applied to the new game. At the time MMA was only in the planning stage. The company folded as the Mandík and Bartáček decided to change careers.

== Reception ==
The game received mixed reviews from critics with Score from 30% to 65%. Reviewers agreed that this is a very professionally conceived work, and included many firsts, thereby advancing the Czech adventures gaming industry.

Vladimir Ponechal reviewed Mise Quadam for Excalibur magazine. Ponechal noted that first thing that caught his interest was well-crafted manual. He praised game's story and humor. Ponechal mentioned that game's protagonist David resembles Dempsey. He likened the game to titles by Pterodon such as Tajemství Oslího ostrova and 7 dní a 7 nocí. On the other hand, animation and graphics were criticised. Ponechal concluded that Mise Quadam can be compared to best Czech adventure games of the time. He noted that gameplay and idea can compensate for poor graphics.

Tomáš Landa of Level magazine gave Mise Quadam 50%. He stated that game is more difficult than it should be because game's graphics is confusing. He also mentioned that story seems illogical on the first sight. He noted that he understood the story when he played the game for second time. He also criticised poor graphics.

Andrej Anastasov wrote review for Score magazine. He was very critical and gave 30%. Anastasovv stated that the game is very amateur performed. He stated that every aspect of the game is bad. He criticised graphics as ugly and story as weird. He was critical of gameplay that is illogical.

Matěj Baran of Riki magazine gave 55%. He noted that the game reminds him of Terminator. He noted that graphics and music are poor. He also noted high difficulty which resulted in nervous experience. On the other hand, he stated that he enjoyed much fun playing the game.
