= Modern Combat 2: Black Pegasus =

2010 video game

- Developer: Gameloft Montreal
- Publisher: Gameloft
- Series: Modern Combat
- Platforms: iOS, Android, Xperia Play, BlackBerry PlayBook
- Release: October 7, 2010: iPhone October 7, 2010 iPad October 14, 2010 Android January 28, 2011 Xperia April 22, 2011 BlackBerry PlayBook December 6, 2011
- Genre: First-person shooter
- Modes: Single-player, multiplayer

Modern Combat 2: Black Pegasus is a 2010 first-person shooter developed by Gameloft Montreal, published by Gameloft for iOS, Android, Xperia Play and BlackBerry PlayBook devices as part of the Modern Combat series. It is a sequel to 2009's Modern Combat: Sandstorm, and features new environments, updated graphics and more robust multiplayer. A sequel was released in 2011, titled Modern Combat 3: Fallen Nation. This was followed by 2012's Modern Combat 4: Zero Hour and 2014's Modern Combat 5: Blackout.

== Gameplay ==
A multiplayer game in Modern Combat 2. The player has just been awarded 50 experience for killing a member of the opposing team. However, the player has also been injured, represented by the red outline around the screen.

The gameplay in Black Pegasus is quite similar to that of its predecessor, and also similar to Call of Duty 4: Modern Warfare and Call of Duty: Modern Warfare 2, as players travel through various environments, such as a snowy mountain and a jungle. There are three controllable characters in the game; Lieutenant "Chief" Warrens (the protagonist from Sandstorm), Sergeant Anderson, and Private Newman, who are members of Delta, Razor, and Mustang Squads, respectively.

The game is controlled using virtual buttons on-screen; a virtual control stick on the left of the screen is used for movement, while aiming is achieved by swiping on the touchscreen. Gyroscopic controls are featured on the iPhone 4 and fourth generation iPod Touch. The player can also crouch, throw grenades, use their weapon's iron sights, reload, change weapon, pick up different weapons, knife enemies, mantle obstacles, and shoot using buttons and prompts on the touchscreen. All controls can be customized from the main menu. The single-player campaign also includes Quick time events.

The graphics have advanced considerably since the previous game, due to the power of a new engine. On fourth generation devices utilizing a Retina Display, the graphics are even better.

=== Multiplayer ===
In addition to the single-player campaign, the game also includes an online multiplayer mode for up to 10 players, a drastic upgrade from Sandstorm's four. Modes include "Capture the flag", "Deathmatch", "Team deathmatch", and a mode in which one team attempts to defuse a bomb while the other team protects it ("Demolition"). Killing enemies and securing objectives earns experience points, allowing players to level up through 72 ranks, rising up the global leaderboard, and unlocking new weaponry and bonuses. The host of the match can select the number of players, the time limit, score limit, and whether or not to allow "Aim Assist" and "Health Regeneration".

On April 12, 2011 downloadable content (DLC) was released for $1.99 under the name "Modern Combat 2: Black Pegasus Multiplayer Map Pack 1". It included three new maps ("Bunker", "Battlefield", and "Shanty Town"), all based on levels in the game. The update also fixed a few bugs with the game, such as killing teammates, and added a new look to the map "Jungle".

== Plot ==
The game begins with two members of Mustang Squad imprisoned in the compound of international terrorist Pablo. Private Newman is being questioned by Pablo until he's knocked out with a rifle butt to the head. Private Downs then rescues Newman and they attempt to escape. However, after entering another part of the compound, they are caught in an ambush.

The game then shifts in time prior to the capture of Newman and Downs, as Lt. Mike "Chief" Warrens and Delta Squad assault an oil rig in the Middle East in an attempt to find Kali Ghazi (an underling of Abu Bahaa; the antagonist from Sandstorm). The mission is a success, but several men are lost during the fighting. Delta Squad interrogate Kali, persuading him to give up the name of his new boss.

Meanwhile, Sgt. Anderson and Razor Squad escort Azimi, a Middle Eastern politician, as he travels to the safety of the American embassy for peace talks. The convoy is attacked en route, but manages to make it to the embassy only to find the embassy itself has been attacked. The squad save the remaining American hostages, but then discover that Azimi himself is in fact a terrorist. During the subsequent battle, Azimi is killed.

Acting on information provided by Kali Ghazi, Mustang Squad travel to the compound of an eastern European arms dealer named Nikkitich. Fighting their way through a power plant, Newman ultimately finds Nikkitich inside a tank. Nikkitich surrenders and gives up his boss, Popovich, who has connections to the other leaders of the terrorist cell. Mustang Squad attack Popovich's bunker, with Newman and Downs heading to a Cold War-era bunker to find Popovich. However, they themselves are captured and taken to Pablo's compound.

The game then picks up with Newman and Downs caught in the ambush. They survive and manage to escape in a waiting helicopter. Acting on information provided by Newman and Downs, Razor Squad then heads to Pablo's private villa, where he is believed to be hiding. They attack the villa, but Pablo escapes into a nearby shanty town. After meeting Pablo's translator, Anderson follows Pablo, and destroys a helicopter protecting him. After a brief fight, Anderson kills Pablo by shoving a grenade into his mouth and pulling the pin.

== Weapons ==
Whereas Sandstorm had only seven weapons, Black Pegasus has fifteen; including multiple pistols, two SMGs, several assault rifles, two sniper rifles, two shotguns, and an RPG, among others. Weapons can also be fitted with attachments like red dot sights or silencers.

When players first start with multiplayer, they can only use an AK-47 and a Beretta M9. As characters gain experience, they unlock new weapons and 'skills', such as increased movement speed. In multiplayer, there are variations for several of the weapons. Examples include a red dot sight on the MN106, and silencers for many secondary weapons. These variations grant advantages to the weapon, and in some cases slight disadvantages. They are unlocked after all the primary weapons are unlocked.

Weapons include an AK-47, an S1 Custom, an M40A3, an M249, an MN106 (a fictional assault rifle based on the real life M16A3), a Benelli M4, a Dradonitch (fictional semi-automatic sniper rifle based on the real life Dragunov sniper rifle), an RPG-7, a Beretta M9, a MAC-11, a Desert Eagle and an MP5

== Reception ==
Reception

Aggregate score
Aggregator	Score
Metacritic	90/100

Review scores
Publication	Score
4Players	82%
Destructoid	4.5/10
Gamekult	8/10
GamePro	5/5
Gamezebo	90/100
IGN	8.5/10
Macworld	4/5
Pocket Gamer	(iPhone) 4.5/5 (Mobile) 3/5
TouchArcade	5/5
Common Sense Media	4/5

Black Pegasus has received extremely positive reviews, even better than those of its predecessor. The iPhone version received "universal acclaim" according to the review aggregation website Metacritic.

IGN's Levi Buchanan said, "Modern Combat 2 is Gameloft's best shooter yet, [...] even better than N.O.V.A.. But it's online that really takes things to the next level, with persistent perks that inspire you to keep playing. I recommend it to anybody seeking a great shooter for their iDevice." Chris Hall of 148Apps said, "the graphics are killer, the sound is great (especially with headphones), the weapon selection is top notch, the multiplayer is great, and the controls are easily the best I've ever encountered. Fans of the FPS genre will certainly not be disappointed with Modern Combat 2. If you've been waiting for a true first person shooter on the iPhone, now is the time." AppSpy's Andrew Nesvadba argued that it improved exponentially on Sandstorm, saying, "Modern Combat 2: Black Pegasus not only continues the franchise, but it feels like so much more and the time spent waiting for this epic shooter was not without its benefits [...] The gorgeous Retina optimized graphics and single-player campaign are more than enough to justify grabbing Modern Combat 2: Black Pegasus, but the luscious and brutally fun multiplayer clinches the whole deal and action fans really should make it their next big purchase."

Pocket Gamer's Tracy Erickson wrote of the iPhone version, "while it likely won't be long before a new game raises the bar, Modern Combat 2 has for now set the new shooter standard." Slide to Play's Chris Reed called it "top notch modern warfare on the go" and praised the multiplayer feature. TouchArcade's Eli Hodapp said, "there is absolutely nothing like it on the App Store [...] The single player, while entirely cliche [sic], is extremely fun to play through and the online multiplayer is incredible. Our forum members have been going crazy over the game, and as it stands, Modern Combat 2 is the king of iPhone first person shooters. For now, anyway."

TouchGen's Matt Dunn, who had been somewhat critical of the first game, was again critical of the second game's storyline ("the single player campaign suffers from almost all the same issues that the original game suffered from. The story is almost non-existent, and is limited to a few sentences before each mission and some limited in-game dialogue"), and also criticsed some of mechanics of the game ("from a technical standpoint, MC2 leaves something to be desired. The collision detection for bullets is pretty bad, especially when sniping. About half the time, a direct headshot won't do anything to an enemy, or will be recorded as a body shot. Grenades and explosions are inconsistent as well"), but they praised the graphics ("Modern Combat 2 is a fantastic-looking game, with some of the best graphics I've seen in an App Store shooter. The game looks crisp and clear in both single player and multiplayer, and is one of those "show your friends" kind of games, for those doubting the graphical power of the A4 processor in the iPhone") and the multiplayer ("MC2 multiplayer gameplay is an absolute blast, and feels very solid [...] If you're a fan of online shooters, but don't mind the clunky menus or inability to easily play with friends, this is the game for you. The 5 vs 5 online matches are intense, and the different gametypes offer a nice variety of gameplay options. The addition of ranking and kill signatures will keep you playing for a while to come, and the gorgeous graphics really give the feel that this is much more than a mobile game").

However, the only critic to give the iOS version a negative review was James Stephanie Sterling of Destructoid, who stated, "When it works, Black Pegasus is a decent experience, but it's not a patch on the first game. Controls are poorly placed and the whole game feels sloppy and rushed, which is abysmal behavior from what is usually one of the best iOS developers in the business. Oh, and nobody's playing the multiplayer."
