= Modern Combat 4: Zero Hour =

2012 video game

- Developer: Gameloft Montreal
- Publisher: Gameloft
- Series: Modern Combat
- Engine: Havok
- Platforms: Mobile phone, iOS, Android, Windows Phone 8, BlackBerry 10, BlackBerry PlayBook
- Release: Mobile; 2012 iOS & Android; December 6, 2012; Windows Phone 8 April 10, 2013; BlackBerry 10; May 14, 2013; BlackBerry PlayBook; June 20, 2013
- Genre: First-person shooter
- Modes: Single-player, multiplayer

Modern Combat 4: Zero Hour is a 2012 first-person shooter developed and published by Gameloft Montreal for mobile phones, iOS, Android, Windows Phone 8, BlackBerry 10 and BlackBerry PlayBook. It is the fourth game in the Modern Combat series, and is a sequel to 2009's Modern Combat: Sandstorm, 2010's Modern Combat 2: Black Pegasus and 2011's Modern Combat 3: Fallen Nation. A sequel was released in 2014, Modern Combat 5: Blackout.

The iOS version of Zero Hour supports the iPhone 5. Gameloft released a gameplay teaser on September 25, 2012, along with a new Modern Combat website. The teaser trailer showed high definition graphics, but with some graphical improvements over its predecessors, such as real-time shadows. Other improvements include more "military support" options, more tactical gameplay and more advanced campaign programming. The game is set in a dystopian year 2037, where the SGS, an undercover armed force, dominates the world and fights against Phantom Unit.

== Gameplay ==
Example of a drone mission in Modern Combat 4.

The basic gameplay in Zero Hour is similar to the three previous games in the series, and also similar to the Call of Duty games. However, Zero Hour is more derivative of Call of Duty: Black Ops II and Call of Duty: Black Ops than the Modern Warfare series (Call of Duty 4: Modern Warfare, Call of Duty: Modern Warfare 2 and Call of Duty: Modern Warfare 3), upon which the previous games in the series were based. Unlike the previous games, the players also control the antagonist Edward Page for some selected levels, as well as assume the role of a drone operator in a level. The players also control Sergeant Anderson in one level. The game is controlled using virtual buttons on-screen; a virtual control stick is used for movement, while aiming is achieved by swiping on the touchscreen. Gyroscopic controls are also featured. The player can also crouch, throw grenades, use their weapon's iron sights, reload, change weapon, pick up different weapons, knife enemies, mantle obstacles, and shoot using buttons and prompts on the touchscreen. All controls can be customized from the main menu. The single-player campaign also includes Quick time events.

=== Multiplayer ===
As with the three previous games, Zero Hour features a multiplayer mode. Like Fallen Nation, twelve players can participate in any given game. The game features several maps based on levels and areas in the single-player campaign, with numerous game types available, such as "Battle", "Team Battle" and "Capture the flag". Players can customize six different 'classes', with slots available for primary weapons, secondary weapons, attachments for both, grenades, equipment and a perk. Different weapons can be bought for money earned by completing matches and killing enemies. Unlike other games in the series, Zero Hour's multiplayer features the ability for players to climb over obstacles, an ability previously only available in single-player mode.

== Plot ==
The game begins as Lieutenant Walker (one of the protagonists from Modern Combat 3: Fallen Nation) gives a speech to his squad mates on board a troopship, warning them that the upcoming struggle is going to be extremely difficult. The ships reach a beach in Hawaii, and the player takes control of Corporal Joel Blake as he fights his way to a stronghold to rescue a group of politicians who were attending a peace summit, which was named as the C3 (Centralized Currency Consortium) Conference. Amongst the hostages is the US President, they meet Lieutenant Downs (a major NPC in Black Pegasus and Fallen Nation) and storm the stronghold, the team discovers that the security hired for the summit, a private military company called Saunders Global Security, are in fact the ones responsible for the attack and the hostage situation.

The game then switches to the perspective of Edward Page (a supporting antagonist in Fallen Nation) two days prior to the invasion of Hawaii. A former Green Beret, he is now turned against the US and has vowed to destroy the country and undermine its political ideologies. Accompanied by another former Green Beret, and CEO of Saunders Global Security, Everett Saunders, Page infiltrates the War Crimes Investigations building in Seattle, and destroys it. Meanwhile, Sergeant Anderson (one of the protagonists in Black Pegasus and a major NPC in Fallen Nation), now part of the AFTER (Americas First Tactical Emergency Response) Operatives fights his way through the devastated streets of Seattle towards the WCI building only to discover that the destruction of the building was a distraction, so that Page could kidnap the US President in Hawaii.

After the mission in Hawaii fails to rescue the President, Intel confirms that Saunders is somewhere in the city of Barcelona, so Walker, Blake and Downs are dispatched to find him and extract information on where Page may have taken the President. They eventually locate Saunders, but after a long chase he is apparently killed, not before he provides Blake with a hard disc containing intel on Page. During the mission, it is revealed that Page has started a terrorist group named Unified Citizens and is using SGS as protection.

Based on the info from the disc, the team is then sent to South Africa, where it has been discovered that Page was using the SGS base as cover. Briefly after attacking the base, Blake is knocked out of his helicopter and forced to fight his way through the base alone. He rescues the President and then reunites with Walker and Downs. The president gives information indicating that Page is holding up in a base in Antarctica.

The team along with Anderson (who "volunteered" for the operation) is dispatched, and discover that Page plans to fire a bioweapon named H5N1 capable of killing about 4 billion people, in an effort to "restart" the human race. Anderson and Blake are ordered to wait for a hazmat squad to arrive, but Anderson disobeys orders and begins planting bombs on the bioweapon canisters. However, he is attacked and stabbed by Page whilst planting the bombs. Before he dies, Anderson tells Blake (who was trapped outside the bioweapon room by Anderson) to detonate the bombs. Blake does so, with the blast killing Anderson and incapacitating Page.

When Page regains consciousness, he finds that US soldiers are breaking into the base and planting bombs on the bioweapon canisters. Realising that he is defeated, an enraged Page fights his way through the base and attacks Downs and Walker, shooting Downs in the arm and fighting hand-to-hand with Walker. Page overpowers Walker and is about to kill him when Blake attacks him from behind, killing him and saving Walker's life. Walker, Blake and Downs then flee the building before it blows up.

In a post-credits scene, it is revealed that Saunders is alive. He states that he was using Page all along, and that he has already put in motion the first part of a terrorist attack of his own, claiming that soon the US "will know the true meaning of terror."

== Weapons ==
Whereas Sandstorm featured seven weapons and Black Pegasus featured fifteen, Zero Hour features twenty-one, as had Fallen Nation, in addition to throwing knives, grenades, different equipment and several "perks". Weapons can also be fitted with numerous attachments like red dot sights, silencers and extra-large magazines.

Unlike in Sandstorm and Black Pegasus which featured predominantly real world weaponry, the weapons in Zero Hour follow those in Fallen Nation insofar as they are fictional, but based on real world counterparts.

Weapons include a Black Mamba (based on the Chiappa Rhino), a Charbtek VECT9 (M4A1), a Charbtek-28 (M27), a CTK-88 Crumplor (AT4), an E24 SASR (Remington Semi Automatic Sniper System), a Compakt 665 (SIG556), a Kolbászky S-40 GL (Brügger & Thomet GL-06), a SOCAR-S A1 (CZ-805 BREN), a Tygr X3 (CZ Scorpion Evo 3 A1), a Viny Pro (Uzi), a Volkhov-12 (Saiga-12) and an X6 .338 (XM2010 Enhanced Sniper Rifle), a KR200 (AK47), a Schoc 33 (Glock 18)

== Reception ==
Reception

Aggregate score
Aggregator	Score
Metacritic	82/100

Review scores
Publication	Score
GamesMaster	75%
IGN	7.8/10
Jeuxvideo.com	(Android) 15/20
MacLife	4/5
MeriStation	8/10
Pocket Gamer	3.5/5
TouchArcade	(MP) 5/5 (SP) 4/5

Although the iOS version received "favorable" reviews according to the review aggregation website Metacritic, such reviews tended to feel that the Modern Combat series had become somewhat stagnant.

IGN's Justin Davis said, "Much like the Call of Duty franchise that it apes, Modern Combat 4 can sometimes feel more like soulless and disconnected series of set-piece battles instead of a cohesive FPS experience. The 13-mission, 4-hour campaign feels designed by check-box. Unmanned drone mission? Check. Sniper segment? Check. A contrived occurrence separates you from your squad? Check check check [...] This is the first Modern Combat title that isn't a clear improvement over its predecessor." However, he did conclude by stating "Modern Combat 4 might be a small step backwards but it's still an impressive, action-packed adventure. At its best, the game offers up real moments of intense gunplay." Carter Dobson of 148Apps wrote, "Really, what Modern Combat 4 does is that it's not an original game. Its influences are clear. But Gameloft knows how to do [sic] make a game with high production values, that loses little because of the transition. I'm never going to expect these games to have perfect controls because it's practically impossible given just a touchscreen to use. But for those that want to sit in Starbucks and pwn some noobs instead of doing it from their couch, well, that's why these games exist. And as the technology improves, they're more closely resembling their inspirations." Pocket Gamer's Harry Slater was critical of several aspects, saying, "Poor pacing, baffling AI, and odd checkpoints add to the feeling that the game needed a little longer in development, and a slew of glitches and bugs cement that fact [...] Multiplayer feels a little tighter, but the bugs that riddle the single-player remain in place." He echoed IGN in stating, "Modern Combat 4: Zero Hour isn't a step forward for the series. In fact, in many cases, it's a step back, with bugs and crashes turning entertainment into frustration. But, and this is a big but, there's really nothing else like it out there right now."

Slide To Play's Chris Reed was more positive, writing, "Modern Combat 4: Zero Hour is yet another solid addition to the mobile FPS franchise. It sports a lengthy single-player campaign, top-notch multiplayer content, and enough changes and tweaks to make it a worthy purchase even to people who played last year's model." TouchArcade's Eric Ford felt that the game's single-player mode failed to advance on the others in the series, saying, "outside of the visual improvements Zero Hour really hasn't changed much in regards of the single player campaign. Sure, there's a new adventure with different places to go and people to kill, but it's all been done at this point." TouchGen's Nigel Wood was impressed, arguing that the ability to play some levels as the antagonist was a well implemented idea and saying, "I particularly liked one instance where as Page you witness three special forces abseiling into your compound, and must make your way to the escape route with the captured president – all the while taking out other special forces. Once the level is complete, you then become one of the abseiling special forces guys and must chase the same Page you were just playing, to try and save the President. It's a nice touch to the usual, linear, proceedings." He was also impressed with the graphics, saying, "It's easily the best looking FPS on iOS no matter what device you play it on. From the well designed and easy to use interface, to the highly detailed and large environments, it's a real eye pleaser."
