= Modern Combat =

Series of video games by Gameloft

- Official series logo
- Genres: Shooter; First-person shooter
- Developer: Gameloft Montreal (2009–present) Gameloft Romania Srl (2014)
- Publisher: Gameloft
- Platforms: Keypad-based mobile phones Java ME; Android iOS, iPadOS, webOS, Bada, Xperia Play, BlackBerry PlayBook, Bada 2.0, Windows Phone 8, Windows 10, BlackBerry 10, Tizen, Nintendo Switch
- First release: Modern Combat: Sandstorm; August 27, 2009
- Latest release: Modern Combat: Rebel Guns; October 30, 2019

Modern Combat is a series of shooter video games developed and published by Gameloft mainly for Android and iOS. All installments in the series play similarly to that of the Call of Duty and Battlefield franchises and feature multiple missions in varied environments with different tasks for players to complete. The main enemies in the games are terrorists, and often, the player is accompanied by other soldiers who fight alongside them. Modern Combat: Sandstorm is the first game in the Modern Combat series and was followed by 2010's Modern Combat 2: Black Pegasus, 2011's Modern Combat 3: Fallen Nation, 2012's Modern Combat 4: Zero Hour, 2014's Modern Combat 5: Blackout, 2017’s Modern Combat: Versus, 2019's Modern Combat: Rebel Guns, and in 2026 a spin-off on arcade machines named Phantom Vanguard : Modern combat.

== Video games ==
Year	Game	Platform(s)
2009	Modern Combat: Sandstorm	Android, iOS, webOS, Bada
2010	Modern Combat 2: Black Pegasus	Java ME, Android, iOS, Xperia Play, BlackBerry PlayBook
2011	Modern Combat: Domination	PlayStation Network, macOS
2011	Modern Combat 3: Fallen Nation	Android, iOS, Bada 2.0, BlackBerry PlayBook
2012	Modern Combat 4: Zero Hour	Java ME, Android, iOS, Windows Phone 8, Blackberry 10, BlackBerry PlayBook
2014	Modern Combat 5: Blackout	Android, iOS, tvOS, Windows 8.1, Windows 10, Nintendo Switch
2017	Modern Combat: Versus	Android, iOS, Windows 8.1, Windows 10, Steam
2019	Modern Combat: Rebel Guns	Android
2026	Phantom Vanguard : Modern Combat	arcade machine

== Reception ==
Aggregate review scores As of August 2, 2014.
Game	GameRankings	Metacritic
Modern Combat: Sandstorm	82.57%	NA
Modern Combat 2: Black Pegasus	84.29%	90/100
Modern Combat: Domination	73.00%	67/100
Modern Combat 3: Fallen Nation	90.56%	88/100
Modern Combat 4: Zero Hour	85.00%	82/100
Modern Combat 5: Blackout	82.63%	81/100
Modern Combat: Versus	NA	67/100

The 5 main entries of the series have been met with mainly positive reviews from critics, while the spin-off games Modern Combat: Domination and Modern Combat: Versus received mixed reviews.

In 2026, Gameloft announced that the franchise had surpassed 450 million downloads in total, primarily thanks to Modern Combat 5: Blackout, which is the only free-to-play title among the five main installments.
