= Enemy in Sight =

Enemy in Sight may refer to:

- Enemy in Sight (card game)
- Enemy in Sight (video game)
