= Mavlin: Vesmírný únik =

- Developer(s): Mael Software Group
- Publisher(s): Mael Software Group
- Release: 1994
- Genre(s): Adventure

Mavlin: Vesmírný únik (Mavlin: Space Escape) is an adventure game developed and published by Mael Software Group as its debut title in 1994. It was one of the first Czech point-and-click adventures.

== Plot and gameplay ==
The player takes control of Earthling Mavlin Malner who is kidnapped by aliens in a flying saucer to the planet of Moguns, and must make his way back home again. The game has fail-states; it is possible for the main character to die.

The game is a point and click adventure with a science fiction theme. Players control Mavlin via six graphically presented commands. The game contains an inventory. Items may only be interacted with hotspots on the screen and can't be combined.

== Development ==
Mael Software Group was formed in 1994 in Děčín by Petr Mandík. The game was worked on by Petr Mandík, who programmed on a black-and-white IBM PC compatibld, and Tomáš Jerie, who created the graphics once it was already programmed on the Amiga 500 computer. The game engine is similar to Sierra Entertainment's Leisure Suit Larry 5, which Mandík had played in the summer of 1994. After finishing that title, he tried to program a similar one, which took about four weeks. The following four weeks after that saw the game's narrative and graphics come into being. The duo playtested the game together in their house and decided that it was fun; they chose to distribute it to players after the holidays, which they did by copying the game to floppy disks and offering it to retail stores.

== Reception ==
Unlike contemporary Czech games such as Tajemství Oslího ostrova (1994) and 7 dní a 7 nocí (1994), Mavlin: Vesmírný únik received a negative reception. For instance, Excalibur magazine only gave the game a rating of 18%, particularly criticising the music and graphic design. Computer Experts likened the title to Stíny noci.
