= N.O.V.A. 3 =

2012 video game

- Developer: Gameloft Bucharest
- Publisher: Gameloft
- Series: N.O.V.A.
- Engine: Irrlicht
- Platforms: iOS; Android; BlackBerry 10; Windows Phone 8
- Release: iOS & Android; NA: 10 May 2012; EU: 10 May 2012; BlackBerry 10 9 March 2013; Windows Phone 8 12 June 2013
- Genres: Action-adventure; first-person shooter

N.O.V.A. 3 (Near Orbit Vanguard Alliance 3) is a science fiction action-adventure first-person shooter touchscreen video game developed by Gameloft Bucharest and published by Gameloft as the third instalment of the N.O.V.A. series, released on the App Store and Google Play on May 10, 2012 for iOS, BlackBerry 10 and Android devices, with later releases for the BlackBerry PlayBook and Windows Phone 8 devices in 2013. Unlike its predecessors, N.O.V.A. 3 was more heavily inspired on games like Killzone, Call of Duty and Crysis 2. The game's main influences prior were the Halo series.

As with many of the action-adventure titles released by Gameloft, N.O.V.A. 3 features Gameloft's multiplayer service “Gameloft Live”. The game was removed from the Google Play Store following the release of “N.O.V.A. Legacy” in 2017, with the App Store following suit on the only version left on the platform, Premium Edition, both due to architecture compatibility shifting to 64 bit on newer devices. The game’s multiplayer servers would also shut down 2 years later.

== Campaign ==
The campaign has a total of 10 singleplayer levels, in which the protagonist is, once again, the former Near Orbit Vanguard Alliance (NOVA) captain, Kal Wardin.

=== Plot ===
Kal Wardin receives a distress call from his AI assistant (Yelena) on his way to the abandoned planet Earth. He crash-lands in the remnants of the city of San Francisco and joins up with the squad “Echo One” to re-activate communications and fight their way to the NOVA base. There, he finds out that NOVA has stolen a Judger artifact in the hopes that it could make Earth habitable again. Kal is approached by Prometheus, who tells Kal that the Volterites had discovered the location of more artifacts and were attempting to seize them as weapons of destruction. Prometheus sends Kal to a Judger Ship, where Kal meets a rebel Psycher named Maz' Rah, who helps the protagonist take over the ship. Once Kal retrieves the artifact, Prometheus immediately transports him to the location of the third artifact, the planet “Boreas”, where Kal fights Volterite and thugs. Kal meets up with his old friend Rufus who aids him for the rest of the journey. After the protagonist finds another artifact, he and Rufus find out that Maz'Rah and Yelena are initiating a self-destruct system on the planet. The Kar'rak, controlled by Maz'Rah, kills Yelena. Kal destroys the monster and Maz'Rah turns on the Overseer, resulting in both of their deaths. The planet falls apart, as Kal and Rufus are teleported to safety by Prometheus.

=== Gameplay ===
N.O.V.A. 3 was made for mobile touchscreen devices, so it has customizable button controls and a joystick for walking. The player can carry ten weapons with each having different characteristics, another way to damage enemies are three abilities with unlimited uses. There are ten types of enemies, each also having different abilities. In some levels, the player could use the “4x4” V2’s Machine Gun and the Mech.

=== Enemies ===
- Infected Marines.
- Stingers.
- Psychers.
- Spiders:
- Thugs.
- Skull Crushers.
- Cybertooths.
- Large Cybertooths.
- Mechs.
- “4x4” V.2.
- Maz’Rah (boss).
- Kar’rak (boss).

=== Weapons ===
- Handgun.
- Assault Rifle.
- Shotgun.
- Sniper Rifle.
- Rocket Launcher.
- Grenade Launcher.
- Machine Gun Turrets.
- Flamethrower.
- Lightning Gun (purchasable).
- Plasma Rifle (purchasable).
- Railgun (purchasable).
- Grenade.
- Mine.
- “4x4” V2’s Machine Gun Turret.
- Mech.

=== Abilities ===
- Shockwave Blast.
- Electromagnetic Pulse.
- Slowmotion Device.

=== Levels ===
- Homecoming.
- Price of Loyalty.
- Lost ark.
- Seeds of life.
- Hourglass.
- Eye of the Storm.
- Ice and Fire.
- Meltdown.
- Hell's Gate.
- Shadows.

== Multiplayer ==
Multiplayer made a huge, positive impact on the game’s popularity. In terms of gameplay, it was similar to campaign but with major differences: stamina during sprinting is unlimited, mechs can be used at any time and has a different way for getting weapons. It also had voice chat that required headphones.

=== Gamemodes ===
- Free for all: there are no teams, everyone’s against each other, whichever players hits the kill limit first or has the most kills wins at the end of the timer wins.
- Team Deathmatch: similar to the mode mentioned above, but with two teams: Red and Blue.
- Freeze Tag: also a team based mode where enough damage that would normally kill players freezes them instead. Freeze all enemy team members to score a team point. Stand by frozen teammates for 3 seconds to free them.
- Capture the flag: Each team has a base holding a flag. To score a team point you must take the opposing team's flag and return it to your base. Before scoring, your team's flag must be secured in your own base.
- InstaGib: like the “free for all” game mode, but this time everyone has a Railgun.
- Team InstaGib: The same as InstaGib but team-based.
- Capture the Point: capture and then hold control of all points for 20 seconds to score a team point. Stand by a point to capture it.

=== Multiplayer weapons ===
- Handgun.
- Assault Rifle.
- Shotgun.
- Sniper Rifle.
- Rocket Launcher.
- Grenade Launcher.
- Machine Gun Turrets.
- Flamethrower.
- Lightning Gun.
- Plasma Rifle.
- Railgun.
- Grenade.
- Chemical Grenade.
- Mine.
- Melee.
- Mech.
- “4x4” V2 Machine Gun Turret.

=== Multiplayer maps ===
- Last Stand.
- Lost World.
- Badlands.
- Heart of the Machine.
- Scorched Earth.
- Parking Lot.
- Warehouse.

== Version differences ==
Unlike the other three games in the series, N.O.V.A. 3 had three versions with notable differences:

=== Premium Edition ===
This version was simply the full and paid edition of the game, it costed 6.99 dollars in the App Store.

=== Freedom Edition ===
On October 16, 2014, a free version of the game would be released on iOS and on January 17 for Android devices too, the “Freedom Edition”. It had a few differences from the other version, such as the game being locked on 30 FPS, ads after the player loses, a different app icon and other minor differences.

=== Java Version ===
This version was different from the others as it was made for java phones, the game is a 2D shooter and the levels are played out differently

== Reception ==
Reception

Aggregate score
Aggregator	Score
Metacritic	83/100

Review scores
Publication	Score
IGN	7.0/10
TouchArcade	(Single Player) 4.5/5 (Multiplayer) 3.5/5

On Metacritic, the game has an average score of 83 out of 100 based on 21 reviews. As N.O.V.A. 2, the game was well received.
