= TauCeti Unknown Origin =

Unreleased video game

TAUCETI Unknown Origin
- Developer: BadFly Interactive
- Publisher: BadFly Interactive
- Engine: Unreal Engine 4
- Platforms: Windows, OS X PlayStation 4, Xbox One
- Genres: Survival, first-person shooter, role-playing
- Modes: Single-player, multiplayer

TAUCETI Unknown Origin is an upcoming survival role-playing first-person shooter video game developed and published by BadFly Interactive. The game is set in the same universe as Dead Effect and Dead Effect 2.

== Development ==
The game was announced on 7 August 2017 when BadFly Interactive released the first teaser.

In 2018, at Game Access Conference, game's the first demonstration was shown. In August 2020, a demo of game was released for gamers on the App Store and Google Play.

Since 2020, there has been no news about the game from developers. The company's main website went down after October 2021. This has led to speculation that the game's development has stopped. As of 2026, the game has not been released.

== Plot ==
The story is set after Dead Effect 2. Spaceship ESS Meridian floats in the universe without direction due to a system overload. The player escape using an escape pod, and crashes on Tau Ceti f. The player wakes up in a dense jungle and has to survive the harsh environment of the planet.
