= BlackBerry Tablet OS =

- Developer: BlackBerry Limited
- OS family: QNX (Unix-like)
- Working state: Discontinued
- Source model: Closed source, some open source components
- Initial release: April 19, 2011
- Latest release: WiFi 2.1.0.1917 (March 31, 2014; 12 years ago) [±] LTE 2.1.0.1917 (March 31, 2014; 12 years ago) [±]
- Latest preview: 2.1.0.840 / August 14, 2012
- Marketing target: Consumer and Business
- Available in: Multilingual
- Update method: OTA
- Supported platforms: BlackBerry Playbook (ARM)
- Kernel type: Real Time Microkernel (QNX)
- License: EULA
- Preceded by: none
- Succeeded by: Android
- Official website: blackberry.com/playbook-tablet

Support status
- Unsupported

BlackBerry Tablet OS was an operating system from BlackBerry Ltd based on the QNX Neutrino real-time operating system designed to run Adobe AIR and BlackBerry WebWorks applications, currently available for the BlackBerry PlayBook tablet computer. The BlackBerry Tablet OS was the first tablet running an operating system from QNX (now a subsidiary of RIM).

BlackBerry Tablet OS supported standard BlackBerry Java applications. Support for Android apps has also been announced, through sandbox "app players" which can be ported by developers or installed through sideloading by users. A BlackBerry Tablet OS Native Development Kit, to develop native applications with the GNU toolchain is currently in closed beta testing. The first device to run BlackBerry Tablet OS was the BlackBerry PlayBook tablet computer.

A similar QNX-based operating system, known as BlackBerry 10, replaced the long-standing BlackBerry OS on handsets after version 7.

== See also ==
- BlackBerry OS
- BlackBerry 10
