= Hidden & Dangerous 2 =

2003 video game

- Developer: Illusion Softworks
- Publisher: Gathering
- Director: Petr Vochozka
- Producer: Lukáš Kuře
- Designer: Radek Havlíček
- Programmer: Marek Rabas
- Artists: Martin Beneš; Peter Kubek; Radek Marek
- Writer: Radek Havlíček
- Composer: Michal Szlavik
- Engine: LS3D engine
- Platform: Windows
- Release: NA: October 23, 2003; EU: October 24, 2003; Sabre Squadron: EU: September 24, 2004; NA: October 21, 2004
- Genre: Tactical shooter
- Modes: Single-player, multiplayer

Hidden & Dangerous 2 is a tactical shooter video game developed by Illusion Softworks and published by Gathering. It was released October 2003 for Microsoft Windows. It is the second installment and the direct sequel to 2K Czech's predecessor Hidden & Dangerous, it features similar gameplay concepts and themes. Illusion Softworks and creative director Petr Vochozka based the game's setting on stealth operations undertaken by the British Special Air Service behind Axis lines during the Second World War.

== Gameplay ==
Hidden & Dangerous 2, like its predecessor, focuses on the British Special Air Service during the Second World War. It follows the same concept as the original tactical first/third-person shooter. The game's LS3D engine was used by the game Mafia.

Gameplay elements such as the vocal commands, plan or real-time map control, vehicle usage, equipment selection and the first person mechanic were significantly enhanced from the original. The ability to take POWs, added enhanced stealth options for the player which include the acquisition of enemy uniforms. Mission types include, espionage, sabotage, search and destroy, town liberation, prisoner rescue, retrieval of enemy officers and documents, partisan assistance and assassination. The variety of locales include Norway, Libya, a Norwegian fjord, Burma, Austria, France and Czechoslovakia.

The expansion pack Sabre Squadron adds missions in France, Libya and Sicily. Some of the missions are modeled on real SAS exploits. However most of the game takes liberty with the historical time and place of SAS operations. The missions are based on sandbox style gameplay where players are free to roam a map and pursue objectives usually at their leisure and choice of sequence. A real time strategy mechanic also allows players to control events for staged sequential tactical maneuvers or through real time overhead command.

=== Campaign mode ===
The campaign mode in Hidden & Dangerous 2 allows for a single-player, playing as a lone wolf or a team leader. Players may choose from a roster of 30 men to comprise up to a four man team. Detailed mission briefings and full load-out inventory selection for each new campaign/mission. There are over 20 levels with missions in seven campaigns, set in Europe, Africa and Asia where the players visit many historical areas. The game does not possess an overarching narrative. Players can achieve promotions and decorations for bravery, successfully completed missions and/or specific objectives.

=== Multiplayer ===
Hidden & Dangerous 2 has a multiplayer mode that can be played via internet or local area network with up to 99 players. After the 2012 closure of GameSpy servers, there is no longer official multiplayer support. In 2014, a fan-made multiplayer server was set up. It is not officially supported by the creators, as the company and its games network holder no longer exist. There is currently an active worldwide fan community in this game. In multiplayer, there are four game modes represented: Cooperative, Combat, Capture, Quests HD2.

== Hidden & Dangerous 2: Sabre Squadron ==
An expansion pack titled Sabre Squadron was released on October 19, 2004, in the US, and introduced nine new single player missions, seven new multi-player maps and a now finished death-match map called "Poland", which had been featured in the game's intro and was titled "London" and available for play in its unfinished state before this release. It also introduced new weapons (the RPzB 54, the MAS-36, the G43, a suppressed P08 and a Harrington & Richardson Mk VI flare pistol), the ability to hold your breath while looking through a telescopic sight, a cooperative multi-player mode, and access to the original Hidden & Dangerous 2 missions through Sabre Squadron's interface.

== Reception ==
=== Hidden & Dangerous 2 ===
Hidden & Dangerous 2

Aggregate score
Aggregator	Score
Metacritic	75/100

Review scores
Publication	Score
Computer Gaming World	3.5/5
Edge	8/10
Eurogamer	9/10
Game Informer	6/10
GamePro	3.5/5
GameRevolution	B
GameSpot	7.3/10
GameSpy	3/5
IGN	7.9/10
PC Format	88%
PC Gamer (US)	80%

The game received "generally favorable reviews" according to the review aggregation website Metacritic.

Eurogamer said that "it takes all that was good about the original, improves every element, successfully adds new features and delivers a well-rounded game". GamesTM claimed that the game's "minor flaws have to be put into perspective against the sheer quality and quantity on offer". Computer Gaming World stated that Hidden and Dangerous 2 is a "really good game", but also complained about the "dubious tradition of bugs" and criticised the "same pesky bugs and problematic A.I. as the original". Edge called it "one of the finest WWII games of recent memory. Hidden & Dangerous 2 manages to distract you from errors that would cripple a lesser game through its sheer ambition and scale". IGN stated that Hidden & Dangerous 2 is "a great game lurking somewhere underneath all of these questionable design decisions". Game Revolution criticised the difficulty level, artificial intelligence and controls, but praised the game overall, saying "the atmosphere, graphics, scope, versatility and ultimately fun gameplay keeps the bad bits in check". GameSpy called it "a compelling World War II experience". GameSpot called it "frustrating to play" and said "there's clearly a wonderful game hidden amongst the major bugs, cumbersome controls, questionable AI, and other flaws". GamePro also criticised the A.I., while stating that "if you dig tactical shooters, Hidden & Dangerous 2 should be in your sights". Game Informer said that "though the campaign is long, you could pack all of the action into a container half of the size of the Max Payne 2 quest".

The game sold over 1 million units as of August 2004.

=== Sabre Squadron ===
Hidden & Dangerous 2: Sabre Squadron

Aggregate score
Aggregator	Score
Metacritic	67/100

Review scores
Publication	Score
Eurogamer	7/10
GamesMaster	76%
GameSpot	7.3/10
IGN	7/10
PC Format	72%
PC Gamer (US)	78%
PC Zone	77%

The Sabre Squadron expansion pack received "average" reviews according to Metacritic.
