= Chameleon (2005 video game) =

- Developer: Silver Wish Games
- Publishers: Take-Two Interactive; Cenega Czech
- Director: Petr Vochozka
- Producer: Libor Kvasnička
- Designer: Viliam Korbel
- Programmers: Lubomir Dekan, Alexander Gondor, Peter Sevcik, Juraj Miklus
- Engine: LS3D engine
- Platform: Microsoft Windows
- Release: 19 May 2005
- Genres: Third-person shooter, stealth
- Mode: Single-player

Chameleon is a stealth-action video game developed by Silver Wish Games and released in 2005. The game was released in a limited quantity in a limited number of countries and has never been released in western markets. The development was already finished in 2003 but it was published in 2005.

== Gameplay ==
The game focuses on stealth. Players can use spy equipment such as night vision goggles, binoculars, minicams, or cameras. Necessary gadgets are picked up automatically before a mission but some can be added by the player themselves if they want them.

== Plot ==
The story focuses on a nameless former CIA agent who saw the death of his parents when he was a child. He tries to find the killers of his parents and take revenge. His investigation leads him to various locations around the world.

== Reception ==
The game received generally positive reviews from critics. It currently holds 75% on HodnoceniHer.cz (Czech aggregator site).
