= Swigridova kletba =

1996 video game

- Cover of the game
- Release: 1996
- Genre(s): Adventure

Swigridova kletba is a 1996 Czech adventure game developed by Agawa and published by JRC Interactive for DOS.

== Production ==
Agawa released two games: Mise Quadam in 1995 and Swigridova kletba in 1996. The developers were displeased with the graphic processing of their previous title Mise Quadam, so they hired the professional artist Zden Jasanovska for this game.

The game was sold at a price of 500.176 Crowns. The game was one of the first successful Czech adventure games; its design is similar to The Legend of Kyrandia. It is also among the shortest commercially released Czech adventure games.

== Plot and gameplay ==
The game is a fairy-tale adventure similar to The Legend of Kyrandia. The player controls a simple shepherd named Robinto, who is tasked with defeating the evil Swigrid and returning the magic horn of Kerke to his home in Manahon county. The game is divided into three parts; in order to progress to the next part the player has to complete a goal such as getting money for a ferry.

Swigridova kletba is a classic point-and-click adventure based on collecting objects, using them and combining them together. The game is entirely controlled via the mouse. Players explore the environment, talk to characters and solve puzzles. Items can be collected and stored in the inventory at the bottom of the screen. Graphically, the game is similar to Dračí Historie.

== Critical reception ==
Tomáš Landa from Score magazine appreciated the change in graphic design from Mise Quadam. Level magazine felt the game was amateur, especially when compared to Dračí historií, and criticized the narrative for being short, simple and straightforward.

Gamesite.sk felt the game elevated the Czech-Slovakian video gaming industry a little higher, and added that while it was a short adventure, it had its roots in Czech culture and contained Czech dubbing, which was rare at the time. Old-games.ru felt the game was not interesting, yet valuable from a video game history perspective.
