= Enemy in Sight (video game) =

Cancelled video game

- Developer: Illusion Softworks
- Publisher: Atari
- Platform: Microsoft Windows
- Release: Cancelled development
- Genre: First-person shooter
- Modes: Single-player, multiplayer

Enemy in Sight was the working title of a military-themed and strategy-focused first-person shooter video game that was in development by the studio Illusion Softworks. The same team previously created the two similarly themed Hidden and Dangerous titles, to which this game can be seen in many ways to be a spiritual sequel, as well the two Vietcong and Mafia games. The game was cancelled because its developer was acquired by 2K Games and the game's publisher Atari retained the IP rights.

== Gameplay ==
According to Peter Wyse, the title was to feature a very objective-oriented single player, and a team centred multiplayer, although solo game modes were also to be included.

== Setting ==
The game was said to be set in the near future following a fictional war between the United States and Russia, that was to span the whole of Europe and feature huge battlefields of 100 square kilometers or more. According to developer, Peter Wyse, the game began with the player taking on the role of a private in the United States Army. As the game and story progresses the player was to help to push the front line from Plymouth on the south west coast of England to the mountainous area of Germany near the town of Baden-Baden and finally to the White Carpathians of the Czech Republic. The team was putting considerable focus into the accuracy into the design of the games maps, using digital terrain mapping and aerial photographs to create the battlefields. The team had even promised whole towns and villages recreated precisely according to reality although with fewer structures, though these were to have fully modeled interiors.
