= Dead Effect =

2013 video game

- Developer: inDev Brain
- Publisher: BulkyPix
- Engine: Unity
- Platforms: iOS, Android, Windows, OS X
- Release: iOS: WW: September 12, 2013; Android: WW: October 15, 2013; Windows, OS X: WW: December 17, 2014
- Genres: Survival horror, first-person shooter
- Mode: Single-player

Dead Effect is a 2013 first-person shooter video game developed by inDev Brain and published by BulkyPix for iOS and Android. It was released on September 12, 2013 for iOS, and on October 15 for Android. Initially available in the App Store and Google Play for purchase, the game switched to a freemium model in February 2014, with the inclusion of in-app purchases. On February 20, 2014, the game was greenlit for Steam. An early access version was released for Windows and OS X on April 15, with the game going gold on December 17. The game has received mixed to positive reviews, and has been downloaded over three million times. A sequel, Dead Effect 2 was released on October 29, 2015.

== Gameplay ==
Gameplay in Dead Effect. The player aims at an approaching zombie. The virtual joystick is on the bottom left, the fire, reload and ironsights buttons on the bottom right. Weapon selection is on the top right.

The gameplay mechanics of Dead Effect are similar to other first person iOS/Android shooters, such as the games of the Modern Combat or N.O.V.A. series. In the default setup, movement is controlled by a virtual joystick on the left of the screen, with sight and aim controlled by the player moving their finger across the touchscreen, although there are two shortcut buttons on the left and right of the screen to allow the player to instantly turn 90 degrees to the left or right. Players can use explosives, iron sights, reload, change weapons, shoot and enter slow motion mode using virtual buttons on the right of the screen. Controls can be customized from the main menu, with each icon individually repositionable as the player sees fits.

In story mode, the player can play as either a male (Gunnar Davis) or a female (Jane Grey), although there is no difference in storyline or weaponry. The game features twelve missions, which the player must complete in sequence, fighting enemies in the form of zombies and completing tasks such as finding codes to open doors. On various levels, the player also encounters bosses. Each level features pods which replenish the player's health, and in later levels, pods can be found which will upgrade the player's stats. Every level also contains secret orbs, which can be shot, and hidden tablets, which can be collected.

In survival mode, the player must survive for a set amount of time, killing as many enemies as possible. In biohazard mode, the player must defeat waves of enemies. Scores and achievements are tracked through Game Center.

== Story ==
Set in 2045, the game begins with Jane Grey (Note: For the purposes of the plot synopsis, all references to the player character are to Jane Grey, as opposed to Gunnar Davis.) awakening from cryostasis 178 days into the flight of the colonization spaceship ESS Meridian. A member of the elite security team, "Unit 13", Grey is unsure why the computer has awoken her early, and so sets out to learn what is happening. She discovers that the crew of the ship have turned into zombies; detecting unusual activity on board, the computer automatically awakened Unit 13 as per its security protocol. When Grey is able to reactive the comlink on her suit, the computer tells her that there is something wrong with her, but before she can investigate further, she is contacted by Dr. Wagner of the research division. Wagner tells her that the crew have been attacked by a virus that kills and then reanimates them, and that she too is infected, which is why her suit reported health anomalies. Wagner directs her to the med-lab and a computerized medi-bed administers a detox serum.

Wagner tells Grey that the virus is man-made, developed as part of the "Dead Effect" project, but was accidentally leaked and infected the entire crew. He explains that in the absence of the pilot, the ship activated its autopilot, which is programmed to return to Earth. If the Meridian reaches Earth, the virus will infect the whole of mankind. The only way to stop the ship is to manually shut down the propulsion unit. Grey does so, and Wagner directs her to his own location, saying they will decide what to do next together.

When Grey arrives in the lab, Dr. Wagner reveals that she herself is actually part of the "Dead Effect" experiment; they are not on a spaceship at all, they are on a massive orbital research centre, and there was no accidental zombie outbreak - the entire exercise was part of Wagner's research into developing mutagens to increase combat stamina (collectible log files clarify that Dr. Wagner is delusional, and that the ESS Meridian really was a colony ship; Dr. Wagner deliberately mutated the crew and converted the ship into a combat testing ground for his experiments). He tells Grey that she has performed very well, and her results will be archived for future study. He tries to kill her using a medi-bed, but Grey escapes and vows to hunt him down and kill him.

She escapes from the lab and goes in search of Dr. Wagner, who has used a virus on himself, turning him into a zombie-like creature with electrical powers. She finds him in the core of the station, and kills him.

== Reception ==
Dead Effect
(iOS version)

Aggregate scores
Aggregator	Score
GameRankings	70.62%
Metacritic	70/100

Review scores
Publication	Score
148Apps	3.5/5
MacLife	2/5
Modojo	4/5
Pocket Gamer	7/10
TouchArcade	4/5

Dead Effect has received mixed to positive reviews. The iOS version holds an aggregate score of 70 out of 100 on Metacritic, based on ten reviews, and 70.62% on GameRankings, based on eight reviews.

TouchArcade's James Paterson was impressed, scoring the game 4 out of 5. Although he was critical of the lack of originality in the plot, the poor voice acting, the absence of a run ability and no online multiplayer mode, he concluded that "at its core, Dead Effect is yet another fun shooter featuring everyone's favorite reanimated beings. You won't find anything new, but it offers a decent challenge, and has some great replayability in survival mode and trying to earn all the achievements. If you're a fan of violent, bloody, horror themed games, you'll find a good distraction in this one."

Modojo's Chris Buffa also scored the game 4 out of 5. He found the voice acting to be so bad, that it helped the game, by introducing unintended comic elements into an otherwise serious story. He concluded that "Dead Effect entertains despite following the same route we've seen in countless zombie games. Bottom line, it's a good start to what should become an even greater experience in the months ahead. Zombies in space? Sure, why not?"

Pocket Gamer's Harry Slater scored the game 7 out of 10, writing "There may not be much in the way of subtlety in Dead Effect, and it might not rank among the most innovative games on the App Store, but there's a lot of gory, mindless fun here. And sometimes that's all you really want from a game. A big silly shooter with lots of zombies to plough through, Dead Effect is far from a classic. But it is brainless fun."

148Apps' Blake Grundman scored the game 3.5 out of 5, writing "It isn't anything overly special, but it is a passable first person shooter on a platform already littered with far less fruitful attempts. Those looking to indulge their inner B movie lover need look no further."

MacLife's Chris Pereira was less impressed, scoring the game 2 out of 5, and writing "The weapons, setting, music, and enemies are all uninspired, and the gunplay is too weak to compensate. As a result, Dead Effect is a thoroughly run-of-the-mill first-person shooter." He was critical of the controls, the similarity of the levels, the enemy AI, the dialogue and the voice acting. Although he praised the sound effects, he concluded that "for every positive element there's something to gripe about on the other end, whether it's the dull upgrade system or unremarkable shooting. Dead Effect is an uninspired first-person shooter that does nothing original, proving most memorable for its hilariously awful dialogue."
