= Muzeum Mrtvol =

1993 video game

- Developer: Computer Experts
- Publisher: Vochozka Trading
- Writers: Vladimír Peníška, Oldřich Křivánek
- Platform: MS-DOS
- Release: 1993
- Genre: Text adventure
- Mode: Single-player

Muzeum Mrtvol (English: Museum of Corpses) is a 1993 Czech text-based interactive fiction adventure game developed by Vladimír Peníška and Oldřich Křivánek of Computer Experts and published by Vochozka Trading. This genre, known in Czech as "Textovky" were abundant at the beginning of the local video gaming industry, and gradually developed into point and click adventures. The game was released at the same time as another text-based adventure Stíny noci.

In 1994, the game was released in a bundle known as Triptych PC her č.1 alongside Stíny noci and OK Cash Machine.
