= N.O.V.A. 2: The Hero Rises Again =

2010 video game

N.O.V.A. 2
- App icon
- Developer: Gameloft Bucharest
- Publisher: Gameloft
- Series: N.O.V.A.
- Platforms: iOS, Android, HP TouchPad, BlackBerry Playbook, Mac OS X
- Release: NA: December 16, 2010
- Genres: Action-adventure, first-person shooter

N.O.V.A. 2: The Hero Rises Again is a first-person shooter video game, developed and published by Gameloft. It is the second installment of the N.O.V.A. series made for the iPhone, iPad, iPod Touch, HP Touchpad, and Blackberry Playbook, and sequel to the original N.O.V.A. game and predecessor to N.O.V.A. 3. The game was released to the App Store on December 16, 2010 for iOS. N.O.V.A. 2 features Gameloft's multiplayer service Gameloft Live.

== Gameplay ==
Online multiplayer match using Gameloft Live

The gameplay in N.O.V.A. 2 is largely the same as in N.O.V.A. Near Orbit Vanguard Alliance, but features new weapons and several vehicle segments. The storyline is similar to that of its predecessor, following the same protagonist, Captain Kal Wardin, in the fight to protect the human race from the Voltarites, an alien race who allied themselves with a small number of human politicians. The Human-Voltarite Alliance aims to destroy all species that oppose them. N.O.V.A. 2 features gyroscopic controls.

=== Multiplayer ===
Players can take advantage of the multiplayer action via:

- Bluetooth connection
- Local Wi-Fi
- Online: Gameloft Live
  - In the multiplayer action there are eight main levels, and five modes.
  - Levels: jungle, frozen, command center, alien ship, canyon, space, temple, and skycity
  - Modes: free for all, team deathmatch, instagib, capture the flag, and freeze tag

== Plot ==
The game starts with Captain Kal Wardin fighting off an army of aliens called the Volterites in a large spaceship. Later Kal Wardin opens the emergency exit door and proceeds to crash land on a planet where he is targeted by automatic turrets and engaged by troopers. Yelena, the AI attached inside his armor, manages to control Kal's spaceship to wipe out the hostiles. Thereafter, she contacts him and after a brief conversation it is revealed that Kal's current mission is to sabotage a war factory on the planet. On the way to the factory, Yelena explains that there was a new Alliance that planned to assault Earth and destroy its orbitals, Download troops included. After the war factory had been sabotaged, Yelena's current location is found by the Alliance and they plan on deleting her. Kal finds and ambushes an Alliance soldier, who was washing a vehicle nearby, threatening him at gunpoint to drive to the facility where Yelena and Kal's ship is being held.

The scene then turns into a flashback of a week ago, after the events of the first game; Kal Wardin was hidden by a group of colonists for six years and was enjoying his retirement and living peacefully. Soon afterward, when the colonists were under attack by a group of human soldiers and alien forces, they retreated inside the alien ruins nearby while Kal repelled the attack. After eliminating the force that attacked the colonists' village, Kal was interrogating one of the attacking soldiers when he was contacted by Prometheus. He explained that once more, the entire galaxy was at crisis and Kal must once again return to duty.

Back at current events, Kal forces the captured Alliance soldier to drive him to the facility (where his ship and Yelena were held), while he used the machine gun to kill anybody who tried to stop him. After facing countless obstructions, Kal sets free the Alliance soldier, instead of killing him, and heads out to liberate Yelena and his ship from the facility.

After fighting and hacking his way through, Kal manages to escape safely with Yelena and his ship. However, they are pursued by a few Alliance starfighters, who insert soldiers into Kal's ship to try to take over it. Kal, once again, manages to fend off the Volterites, but the core engine had been badly damaged, and Kal is forced to crash-land near the alien ruins where he had successfully fended off the Volterite attacks from the colonists.

After successfully surviving the crash, Kal hears about an artifact housed in the alien ruins located nearby, which the Alliance wants very badly. Kal, seeing no use in an important artifact in the hands of the Alliance, decides to infiltrate the ruins and get the artifact for himself. He gets there in time and, with the help of the automated defense, stops the Volterites from getting the artifact.

== Reception ==
Reception

Aggregate score
Aggregator	Score
Metacritic	90/100 (HD) 88/100

Review scores
Publication	Score
IGN	8.5/10
Slide to Play	4/4

The game was well received by critics and has a Metacritic score of 90/100 based on 10 reviews. Levi Buchanan of IGN awarded the game an 8.5/10, stating that everything from its predecessor had been improved. Slide to Play scored the game a perfect 4/4, saying, "It's not leaps and bounds beyond what we’ve seen before, but as far as first-person shooters on the App Store go, N.O.V.A. 2 is the grandaddy of them all." Pocket Gamer gave a gold award along with a 9/10 rating.
