= Dead Effect 2 =

2015 video game

- Developer: BadFly Interactive
- Publisher: BadFly Interactive
- Engine: Unity
- Platforms: iOS, Android, Microsoft Windows, OS X PlayStation 4, Nintendo Switch
- Release: iOS, Android: 28 October 2015; Windows, OS X: 18 February 2016; Xbox One: 13 January 2017; PlayStation 4: 17 January 2017; Nintendo Switch: 18 November 2021
- Genres: Survival horror, first-person shooter, role-playing
- Modes: Single-player, multiplayer

Dead Effect 2 is a 2015 video game developed and published by BadFly Interactive. It is a sequel to Dead Effect.

== Gameplay ==
The gameplay mechanics of Dead Effect 2 are similar to the original game. In the default setup, movement is controlled by a virtual joystick on the left of the screen, with sight and aim controlled by the player moving their finger across the touch screen, although there are two shortcut buttons on the left and right of the screen to allow the player to instantly turn 90 degrees to the left or right. Players can use explosives, iron sights, reload, change weapons, shoot and enter slow motion mode using virtual buttons on the right of the screen. Controls can be customized from the main menu, with each icon individually repositionable as the player sees fits. Unlike the original game player character fires automatically when their reticle rests on enemy.

In story mode, the player can play as Gunnar Davis, Jane Frey or Kay Rayner. Unlike the first game there is difference in weaponry. Davis is a specialist in heavy weaponry, Jane Frey uses shotgun and Rayner uses melee weapons. Davis features gameplay that is the most similar to the original game.

The Steam version of the game was released on May 6, 2016 and features cooperative multiplayer and player versus player.

== Plot ==
The game takes place on the colony ship ESS Meridian, after the intential release of the Dead Effect virus from the first game. After the player character (either Gunnar Davis or Jane Frey) killed Doctor Wagner in the first game to end his experimentation on the ship's crew, the military has awoken from stasis and is attempting to reestablish order over the ship. The player plays as either Gunnar Davis or Jane Frey again, with the option of playing as new player character Kay Rayner. The player awakens from stasis to hear military doctors arguing about his/her fate, as the military has ordered the elimination of all of Dr. Wagner's experiments, which includes the player character, as their abilities come from Wagner's experiments with the Dead Effect virus. Recovered text logs also indicate that the military believe the player character to be a clone of the original player character, with the game leaving it ambiguous as to whether it is the truth or propaganda from the leadership of the military.

The player character is set free by a woman identifying herself as Danette, who claims to have also been experimented on by Dr. Wagner. Together with two other fugitives from the military, they form a resistance movement to fight for control of the ship from the increasingly authoritarian military and the still very much present infected.

DLC which expands the story with additional missions, as well as resolving the final fate of a traitor from the main campaign was released for Steam and Mobile platforms.

== Reception ==
The mobile version of Dead Effect 2 has received positive reviews it holds 78% on Metacritic.

The PC version of Dead Effect 2 has a score of 53% on Metacritic.

=== Controversy ===
COGconnected reported that developer BadFly Interactive offered them Dead Effect 2 review codes. The email with codes included a warning: "if the review or preview of Dead Effect 2 is very negative, you won't receive any keys from us in the future." This spawned criticism from vmedia towards company. Martin Pospisil from BadFly Interactive admitted that company made a mistake and said that it was caused by experience from some reviews that compared their games with big AAA titles like Left 4 Dead or Mass Effect, which led to very low ratings. He said that BadFly will not blacklist any magazine for negative review if it is fair and honest.

== Possible sequel ==
In June 2016, BadFly Interactive’s CEO and Creative Director Lubomír Dykast said that BadFly Interactive is working on a game that will take place in the same game universe, although it will not be a direct sequel to Dead Effect 2. The possible sequel's name is revealed to be Tau Ceti. It was expected to launch in 2020.
