= Lurid Land =

1997 video game

- Developer(s): Illusion Softworks
- Publisher(s): Abadion Arts
- Programmer(s): Michal Bačík
- Artist(s): Peter Kubek
- Composer(s): Ondřej Matějka
- Platform(s): MS-DOS, Windows
- Release: 1997
- Genre(s): Puzzle-platform
- Mode(s): Single-player, Multiplayer

Lurid Land is a 1997 puzzle-platform game developed by Illusion Softworks.

== Plot ==
The game is set within a kingdom named Agalonhia, which has been overtaken by an evil wizard named Cirilleus. The player takes the role of one of two wizards, either Limbollo or Rupitto, who set out on a journey to defeat Cirilleus and free the country.

== Gameplay ==
The objective of each of the time-limited levels is for the player to save all prisoners and open doors to the next level. In addition, the player must avoid enemies that pursue them. The game features 60 levels that require the player to manipulate objects to complete each level. While predominantly a single-player title, the game can also be played in cooperative or competitive multiplayer mode.

== Reception ==
Lukáš Erben of Score magazine gave Lurid Land a score of 70%, praising the gameplay and technical execution while criticizing the multiplayer mode. Riki magazine also gave the title 70%, praising the gameplay and music while criticizing its 2D graphics.
