= Modern Combat: Domination =

2011 video game

- Developer: Gameloft
- Publisher: Gameloft
- Platforms: PlayStation 3 (PlayStation Network), Mac OS X
- Release: PSN: NA: January 18, 2011; PAL: February 16, 2011; Mac OS X May 18, 2011
- Genre: First-person shooter
- Modes: Single-player, multiplayer

Modern Combat: Domination is an online multiplayer first-person shooter video game developed by Gameloft and released for PlayStation 3 (via PlayStation Network) and Mac OS X. The PSN version was ported to Japan for release on February 15, 2011, about a day before the PAL region release date.

== Game modes ==
Game options	Description
Death Match	Death Match or DM, each for himself, the player who killed the most enemies wins.
Team Death Match	Team Deathmatch or TDM (Team Death Match): the team that killed the most enemies from the opposite team wins.
Domination	3 points (flags) to capture on the map. The team that captured the most flags during an allotted time wins.
Extraction	Mode where you have to retrieve an object and bring it back.
Escort	Mode where you must protect a team leader that has 200 Armor & Life for them to reach an extraction point.
Sabotage	Search and Destroy styled mode where two teams compete.
Boom and Bust	One team tries to activate a Missile while the other tries to prevent the activation.

The game features a progression (rank) system in the form of experience points, awarded according to performance. The user can attain up to 72 ranks in all which increases with the level of XP (Experience Point). As the user progresses in the ranks, more weapons are unlocked to be purchased.

There can be up to 16 players on a server, i.e. up to 8 on each team. If there are odd number of real players, then a bot is added automatically to ensure an even number of team members on both sides.

This game can be played on PlayStation 3 using a DualShock 3 or PlayStation Move motion controller as well as on a Mac OS X.

== Critical reception ==
Reception

Aggregate score
Aggregator	Score
Metacritic	67/100

Review scores
Publication	Score
Eurogamer	7/10
GamesMaster	80%
GameSpot	7/10
GamesRadar+	2.5/5
Jeuxvideo.com	13/20
Push Square	7/10
Metro	6/10

The PlayStation 3 version received "average" reviews according to the review aggregation website Metacritic. GamesRadar+ gave the PS3 version praise for its low cost, graphics and variety of multiplayer modes, but criticism its mishmash game design. GameSpot praised its quick and intense matches and good range of game modes, but criticized it for its long load times and lack of challenging or interesting offline mode.
