= Flying Heroes =

2000 video game

- CD cover
- Developers: Pterodon, Illusion Softworks
- Publisher: Take 2 Interactive
- Engine: Ptero Engine
- Platform: Windows
- Release: NA: April 28, 2000; EU: May 31, 2000
- Genre: Shooter
- Modes: Single-player, multiplayer

Flying Heroes is a fantasy action game produced by Take 2 Interactive, Illusion Softworks, and Pterodon.

== Reception ==
Reception

Aggregate score
Aggregator	Score
GameRankings	64.19%

Review scores
Publication	Score
GamesMaster	75/100
GameSpot	7.8/10
GameZone	3/10
IGN	8.3/10
PC Gamer (UK)	51/100
PC Zone	47/100

Flying Heroes was released to mixed reviews. The positive reviews included IGN awarding it an 8.3/10 Eurogamer 9/10, and GameSpot UK 7.8/10. The less positive reviews included, GameZone, who awarded 3/10, PCZone, who awarded 47/100, and PC Gamer, who awarded 51/100.

The game has sold over 100,000 units as of 2002.
