= Tajemství Oslího ostrova =

1994 video game

- Cover
- Publisher: Vochozka Trading
- Programmer: Petr Vlček
- Artist: Jarek Kolář
- Platform: PC
- Release: 1994
- Genre: Adventure

Tajemství Oslího ostrova (often abbreviated as Too), known in English as The Secret of Donkey Island, is a 1994 Czech point-and-click adventure video game. Distributed by Petr Vochozka through his company Vochozka Trading in June 1994, it was the first nationally distributed PC game in the country and one of the first Czech games commercially available. A parody of the successful Monkey Island series, the story plays out as if it were a direct sequel to The Secret of Monkey Island, ignoring the continuity of Monkey Island 2: LeChuck's Revenge.

== Production ==
=== Conception ===
Jarek Kolář and Petr Vlček began working on the game in 1992 using school computers in the gymnasium of Slovanské náměstí in Brno where they were students. They wanted to use their own game-making tools as well as the ZX Spectrum tools they had been working with. In 1993, Petr Vochozka sold the first-ever Czech commercial adventure game for the Amiga entitled Světák Bob. Later that year, he founded Polička-based Vochozka Trading and released Tajemství Oslího ostrova as the publisher's debut title.

=== Development ===
Development took place between 1992 and 1994. In the first year, the developers used their school computer after receiving permission from their computer science teacher. They faced several challenges, as there was limited information on how to make video games available to developers.

Visual assets from other adventure games were used, which, years later in 2018, caused the magazine Excalibur to express surprise that there were no licensing issues. However, the game's sound effects were created by the developers themselves using computer speakers. Tajemství Oslího ostrova was also one of the first Czech games to feature developed graphics.

=== Release ===
Originally, Kolář and Vlček had no plans to make the game commercially available. They created it to prove that Czech citizens could create a game on par with international productions. They did not care if the game was released commercially or as freeware, but after seeing an advert by Vochozka in Excalibur, the only Czech game magazine at the time, they joined Vochozka under the Pterodon Software brand. The game sold 2,000 copies for 240 crowns each, a considerable increase on Světák Bob, which had sold only a few hundred copies. Vochozka set up an exclusive contract to spread the games of the Pterodon team.

The retail version of the game was originally wrapped only in a plastic bag. A paper-box edition was not available until November of the same year, at which point the second Pterodon Software game was released entitled 7 dní a 7 nocí. The game was released only five years after the Velvet Revolution, when only a small fraction of Czech society understood English. By the end of 1996, Vochozka Trading had produced twelve games.

An English fan translation was released in 2023.

== Plot and gameplay ==
The player takes control of the Guybrush Threepwood parody Gajbraš Trípvůd, who, after an unsuccessful pirate raid, is on the run from LeChuck parody LeGek.

== Critical reception and legacy ==
According to IDNES.cz, the game changed not only Vochozka's life but also the entire Czech gaming scene. The site felt the title had a significant impact in kick-starting the local video game industry.

Objevit felt the game was pioneering, as it was created during a time when few knew Czechs knew how to create computer games and when little documentation or tools were available to teach burgeoning developers. Hernisvet wrote that upon release, the game surprised Czech audiences with its "sophisticated play" and "excellent, completely original themes", noting that even in 2005 the game still held value in the Czech freeware scene. Dovus considers Tajemství Oslího ostrova to be one of the major events in gaming prehistory. Gamepark felt the title was filled with "brilliant humor, pirate stories and beautiful cartoon graphics and great adventures".

Gamesite thought that a big drawback to Tajemství Oslího ostrova was the lack of a musical score except in the opening credits. Gamez.cz described it as a simple game that deserves to be buried in the modern era, though noted its success in sales. Bonusweb thought that while the game was "hilarious", older reviews in magazines like Excalibur, which gave the game a rating of 95%, were greatly exaggerated. The Excalibur review was written by Vochozka, the game's publisher. Bonusweb wrote that despite the game's rough edges, its gameplay, low price, and charm as one of the first Czech games led to players overlooking its weaknesses and making it a hit.

Bonusweb argues that the game is the first Czech commercial game for personal computers and a historic milestone in the home gaming scene.

== See also ==
- Video games in the Czech Republic
