= Enemy in Sight (card game) =

Age of Sail-themed card game

- Designers: Neal Schlaffer
- Illustrators: Charles Kibler; George Parrish, Jr.
- Publishers: Avalon Hill
- Publication: 1988; 38 years ago
- Years active: 1988–?
- Genres: Card game
- Languages: English
- Players: 2–8
- Playing time: 120'
- Age range: 10+

Enemy in Sight is a card game for 2–8 players published by Avalon Hill in 1988 that simulates naval warfare in the Age of Sail.

== Description ==
Enemy in Sight, designed by Neal Schlaffer and originally titled Cutthroats and Cannons, has two decks of cards:

- a deck of various sailing ships of the line, ranging from 1st Rate (the biggest) to 6th Rate (the smallest and most lightly armed)
- a deck of action cards

Each player is dealt a fleet of six ship cards and six action cards. On their turn, the active player draws a number of action cards so that they hold the same number of action cards as they have ships. If a red action card is drawn — it usually affects the active player negatively — it must be played immediately. If a condition on the card means that it cannot be resolved by the player who drew it, the red card is moved to the next player, who must immediately resolve it if possible. If not, the red card continues to be moved from player to player until it is resolved. Otherwise, the active player can use any card in their hand to attempt to sink or capture enemy ships. There are also defensive and damage control action cards. If the active player chooses not to play an action card, they must discard a card.

== Victory conditions ==
The player who is the first to accumulate 100 points in sunk and captured ships is the winner. If the action deck is fully depleted before this happens, the player who accumulated the most points is the winner.

== Reception ==
In The General (Vol 25, Issue #4), Craig F. Posey noted that, "While primarily a fast, playable game capable of being enjoyed by a variety of individuals (even your non-wargaming family), Enemy in Sight has much to recommend it to the devout board-oriented wargamer too." Posey concluded that it can be "a most enjoyable game."

In the October 1988 edition of Games International (Issue 1), Brian Walker gave the game an above-average rating of 4 out of 5, saying, it was "great fun to play especially with a large group of people [...] who have a penchant for churlish acts of revenge."

In the August 1989 edition of Games Games Games (Issue 34), Paul Evans found the tactical considerations slowed the game down and removed it from the realm of a simple, fast "beer & pretzels". He concluded, " I find that the added complication detracts more from the flow of the game than it adds to my enjoyment of it."

== See also ==
- Wooden Ships and Iron Men
