= Stíny noci =

1994 video game

- Developer: Computer Experts
- Programmer: Vladimír Peníšek
- Platform: MS-DOS
- Release: 1994
- Genre: Text adventure
- Mode: Single-player

Stíny noci (English: Shadows of the Night) is a 1994 Czech adventure video game developed by Computer Experts and authored by Vladimír Peniska. It was originally distributed by Vochozka Trading. By 1999, the game could be freely downloaded on the Internet. The game was also released in a bundle in 1994 called Triptych PC her č.1 alongside Muzeum Mrtvol and OK Cash Machine.

== Plot and game play ==
The player is a secret detective who has been tasked with capturing a member of the mafia for a big reward.

Players navigate through a series of screens. Possible directions to travel and objects are listed on the screen. Players are able to die. The graphic have a resolution of 320 × 200 pixels. Each location is described with words, while accompanied by an image. It is strictly not considered a point-and-click adventure by Historie a kontext produkce počítačových her žánru adventure v České republice.

== Critical reception ==
Freegame.cz thought the game was enjoyable, despite having outdated graphics.

Textovky.cz thought it was a great game.
