= N.O.V.A. Near Orbit Vanguard Alliance =

2009 video game

Near Orbit Vanguard Alliance
- Promotion image for the PlayStation Minis release of the game
- Developer: Gameloft Bucharest
- Publisher: Gameloft
- Producer: Arnaud Bonnard
- Designer: Stanislas Dewavrin
- Artist: Arthur Hugot
- Platforms: iOS, webOS, Android, PlayStation Portable, PlayStation 3, Bada
- Release: December 17, 2009; PlayStation Minis: NA: December 21, 2010
- Genres: Action-adventure, first-person shooter

N.O.V.A. Near Orbit Vanguard Alliance is an action-adventure video game for the iPad and other Apple products made for Apple by Gameloft. It was released on December 17, 2009, for iOS, WebOS and is one of the games containing the Gameloft Live online gaming service. It was later released on the PlayStation Network for the PlayStation Portable and PlayStation 3 on December 21, 2010, just five days after the release of N.O.V.A. 2. N.O.V.A Legacy, a remaster of the original N.O.V.A. developed by Gameloft Madrid, was also released for Android on the Google Play Store in 2017 and on iOS App Store in 2018.

== Gameplay ==
N.O.V.A. is primarily a first-person shooter, with one on-rails driving segment. Its single player main story length averages approximately 4 hours. Throughout the game's twelve levels, players fight against alien enemies known as Xenos. The game takes major cues from sci-fi console shooters, such as the Halo and Metroid series. The player can use eight weapons that resemble futuristic versions of weapons found in one of Gameloft's previous works, Modern Combat: Sandstorm.

=== Multiplayer ===
Players can use multiplayer in N.O.V.A. in the following ways:

- Local Wi-Fi
- Local Bluetooth
- Online (via Gameloft Live)

== Plot ==
In the distant future, Earth is no longer able to sustain life, and humans live on artificial satellites called near-orbitals. To protect themselves, the near-orbitals jointly formed a military organization known as the Near Orbital Vanguard Alliance (NOVA).

The protagonist of this story is Captain Kal Wardin, a retired soldier who is forcefully returned to active duty to investigate a missing transport. He is supported by Yelena, a newly created artificial intelligence, and later a starship AI known as Prometheus. He battles against an alien army simply referred to as the xenos, who begin to attack military facilities of NOVA across the planet New Ceres. After multiple occasions of Kal not following orders, the leaders of NOVA delete Yelena and attempt to kill Kal with a hit team, but Kal escapes through a portal to the xenos homeworld to end the invasion.

Upon reaching the planet, Kal learns that the xenos are actually caretakers of an omniscient race of aliens known as the Judgers, whose leader, the Controller, deemed the human race as a threat when the sister ship of the transport vessel entered a portal and crashed into the world below. Kal defeats the controller and confronts the Judgers, who judge him based on the player's actions.

If Kal is committed to saving others, Yelena is restored to life, Prometheus becomes the guardian of mankind and the Judgers' messenger between the two races, and the NOVA leaders are erased from existence for their actions to save themselves rather than the rest of their race.

If Kal doesn't commit to saving others, he is haunted by those he would not save but impresses the Judgers to let him and the rest of humanity live by showing the courage to save others. He is given the title of "Hero of Sagittarius" for his heroics but retires soon after.

== Release ==
=== Reception ===
Reception

Aggregate score
| Aggregator | Score |
|---|---|
| Metacritic | iOS: 94/100 iOS (HD): 65/100; PSP: 48/100 |

Review scores
| Publication | Score |
|---|---|
| IGN | 9.0/10 |
| TouchArcade | 5/5 |

The game was well received by critics and has a Metacritic score of 94/100 based on 9 reviews. Levi Buchanan of IGN awarded the game a 9.0/10, calling it "the best first-person shooter on the iPhone right now." Pocket Gamer gave the game a 9/10 and a "Gold Award". Pocket Gamer also awarded it Best Action/Arcade Game for iPhone in 2010. Slide to Play gave a perfect 4/4, saying "Fans of FPSes shouldn't let this one slip by. Halo ripoff or not, it packs a lot of great content into a tiny, modestly-priced package."

=== HD ===
A high-definition version of this game was released on the App Store on April 1, 2010. However, it is only compatible with Apple's iPad tablet PC.

On July 21, 2010, N.O.V.A, along with Modern Combat: Sandstorm, Gangstar: West Coast Hustle, and Assassin's Creed: Altaïr's Chronicles, was heavily updated for the iPhone 4. It includes gyroscope control, HD and 3D graphics, and is compatible with multitasking on iOS 4.

On August 31, 2010, the free version of N.O.V.A. HD was released for iPad.

A remaster of the game called N.O.V.A Legacy, with updated graphics, a weapon upgrade system, a power meter, and other features was released on March 27, 2017.

== Sequel ==
A sequel to N.O.V.A. was developed and published by Gameloft and released in the iTunes App Store on December 16, 2010, titled N.O.V.A. 2: The Hero Rises Again. The game innovated on the many designs created by the first N.O.V.A., and added many new features such as 10-player online multiplayer matches, retina display and gyroscope support for the iPhone 4. Later, on May 10, 2012, N.O.V.A. 3 was released on the App Store, also developed and published by Gameloft. It added new features such as two-man cars in multiplayer and updated graphics after working with an in-house editor.
