= Modern Combat 5: Blackout =

2014 video game

- Developer: Gameloft Bucharest
- Publisher: Gameloft
- Composer: Vincent Labelle
- Series: Modern Combat
- Platforms: iOS; Android; Windows; Windows Phone; Nintendo Switch
- Release: iOS & Android; July 24, 2014; Windows; October 24, 2018; Nintendo Switch; February 14, 2019
- Genre: First-person shooter
- Modes: Single-player, multiplayer

Modern Combat 5: Blackout is a 2014 first-person shooter developed by Gameloft Bucharest and published by Gameloft. It is the fifth installment of the Modern Combat series and the sequel to Modern Combat 4: Zero Hour. It was released on July 24, 2014 for iOS, Android, Windows Phone 8, Windows 8.1 and BlackBerry 10, on October 24, 2018 for Windows via Steam, and for Nintendo Switch on February 14, 2019. It is the first game in the series that is developed by Gameloft Bucharest, the previous installments were developed by Gameloft Montreal.

== Gameplay ==
Gameplay in Modern Combat 5: Blackout is similar to previous entries in the series. The player can shoot, crouch, sprint, throw grenades, aim, reload their weapons, leap over obstacles, knife enemies, change/pick up weapons, and use abilities supported by the equipped class. A new key feature to Modern Combat 5 is the ability to choose soldier classes ranging from Assault, Heavy, Sniper, Recon, Support, Bounty Hunter, Sapper, X-1 Morph, Kommander, Marauder and Tracker class. Each of which has its own different perks and weapons), although a player's class does not prevent the player from picking up different classes' weapons in-game. As the player continues in certain classes and acquires a "weapon score", new guns and attachments to use in both the campaign and multiplayer are unlocked. Modern Combat 5 is the first Modern Combat game in the series to use DRM and requires a constant internet connection to play (an internet connection is required for the campaign as well as multiplayer).

One major change in the campaign of Blackout, compared to previous Modern Combat titles, is that the missions are shorter. A mission can last five to ten minutes, noticeably shorter than missions of previous entries. Modern Combat 5: Blackout also introduces allies, characters who follow along with the player, often joining in during conflicts.

Like Zero Hour, the campaign missions in Modern Combat 5: Blackout vary in style. The game is primarily a first person shooter, but missions include controlling turrets on boats, helicopters, and even drones.

=== Multiplayer ===
The multiplayer of Modern Combat 5 is similar to other first-person shooters. The weapons carry over from player's campaigns. Players can also form "squads", a feature new to the Modern Combat series. Another new feature is Private Chat, which allows chat between squad members. Currently there are 7 modes: Free For All, Team Battle, VIP, Capture the Flag, Rush, Zone Control and Cargo. There are 9 maps, ranging from canals in Venice and construction sites to office maps and military hangars. There is also a battle royale mode which was added to the game in beta mode after update 27.

== Reception ==
Reception

Aggregate score
Aggregator	Score
Metacritic	iOS: 79/100; NS: 50/100

Review score
Publication	Score
TouchArcade	iOS (Single Player): 4/5 (Multiplayer) 4.5/5

The game was met with mostly positive reviews from critics. The iOS version holds an aggregate score of 79 out of 100 on Metacritic based on 17 reviews. Reviewers praised the game's visuals and sound but criticized the slow-paced gameplay and performance issues. A review by TechRadar explains that the campaign is impersonal. Its review was 3.5 out of 5 stars. However another review by GamesLover, explained that the campaign is too repetitive and boring, giving the game one out of five.
