= 7 dní a 7 nocí =

1994 video game

- Cover of 7 dní a 7 nocí
- Developer: Pterodon
- Publisher: Vochozka Trading
- Release: 1994
- Genre: Adventure

7 dní a 7 nocí (aka Sedm dní a sedm nocí; English: 7 Days and 7 Nights) is a 1994 Czech adventure game released on MS-DOS through Petr Vochozka's Vochozka Trading brand, and published by Pterodon Software. It was the first Czech video game to use Sound Blaster. The game was released in German as 7 Tage, 7 Nächte and in Polish as 7 Dni i 7 Nocy.

== Gameplay and plot ==
This is an erotic comedy inspired by the Leisure Suit Larry series. Jarek Kolář addressed the connections between his game and Leisure Suit Larry by asserting that while Larry acts like an unsuccessful sexual loudmouth, Venca is a self-confident village idiot.

The main character, Venca Záhyb, must look after millionaire Jonathan Smiht's 7 daughters and protect them from potential suitors. However, when he is sitting in a local pub with Fanda Kořen that evening, he bets one lubr that he will get all 7 daughters to the last. So Venca has one day for each girl and always has to overcome certain obstacles to win her heart. For example, in the case of Hermína Smihtová, the biggest obstacle is her homosexuality, in the case of Filoména Smihtová, her appearance, etc.

== Development ==
=== Creation ===
Originally, the developers had planned to follow Tajemství Oslího ostrova (The Secret of the Donkey Island) with an adventure/RPG set at the time of the colonization of Latin America in the vein of the Quest for Glory series. However the project was shelved when Vochozka requested a game with ready-made graphics. The team built an adventure game editor with ready-made graphics and agreed to switch over projects, and they worked on the project while attending school.

=== Release ===
Pterodon completed the PC version in just six months. The game is in 320x200 resolution and contains about 50 locations. It was released in November 1994, the same year as Tajemství Oslího ostrova, and became the first Czech adventure video game to play digital music and sounds through Sound Blaster. One popular highlight of the game was an erotic action scene that saw the player press the two mouse buttons alternately to have protagonist Venca Záhyb make the daughters of Mr. Smiht reach climax. According to Petr Ticháček of Games.cz, "I will not even tell you how many mice I have destroyed" playing 7 dní a 7 nocí. However, Petr Vochozka later said, that the most important thing was to keep the rhythm of clicking, the speed was not so important. Later, the game was released as freeware.

== See also ==
- Video games in the Czech Republic
