= Hidden & Dangerous =

1999 video game

- European Windows cover art
- Developers: Illusion Softworks; Tarantula Studios (PlayStation)
- Publishers: TalonSoft; Take-Two Interactive
- Designers: Michal Bačík; Radek Bouzek
- Programmer: Michal Bačík
- Composer: Jim Rose
- Platforms: Windows, Dreamcast, PlayStation
- Release: Windows: EU: 2 July 1999; NA: 27 July 1999; Dreamcast: NA: 31 July 2000; EU: 8 September 2000; PlayStation: EU: 23 November 2001
- Genre: Tactical shooter
- Modes: Single-player, multiplayer

Hidden & Dangerous is a 1999 tactical shooter video game, developed by Illusion Softworks. It was published by Take-Two Interactive and TalonSoft, for Windows, Dreamcast and PlayStation. The PlayStation port of the game was developed by Tarantula Studios, and it is regarded as a pioneering tactical shooter. A sequel, Hidden & Dangerous 2, was released in 2003.

== Gameplay ==
The player controls a four-man British Special Air Service (SAS) team executing a number of important missions during World War II. The game features soldier selection prior to each mission. A comprehensive load-out sequence is also available where players have access to a variety of weapons and equipment. Mission briefings outline objectives, intelligence on enemy strengths and recommended plans of advance. During missions, players can command directly by toggling through the soldiers in their squad, voice commands or a tactical map which allows for real time control or planned maneuvers once the map is exited.

Missions include sabotage, search and destroy, POW rescue, and resistance aid. The game features 6 campaigns taking place in Italy, Yugoslavia, Germany, Norway, the North Sea and Czechoslovakia. 3 additional campaigns were added with the add-on released later. Despite certain historical liberties taken with actual SAS missions and time-lines, the game retains a degree of historical accuracy and intense atmosphere, including realistic wounding as squad members can be heavily wounded or killed by even brief enemy contact.

The game supports play in either the third or first-person perspectives, with the player able to actively switch between the two while in-game.

== Reception ==
Hidden & Dangerous

Aggregate score
Aggregator	Score	
Aggregator	Dreamcast	PC
Metacritic	72/100	74/100

Review scores
Publication	Score	
Publication	Dreamcast	PC
CNET Gamecenter	8/10	8/10
Computer Games Strategy Plus	N/A	3/5
Computer Gaming World	N/A	4/5
Electronic Gaming Monthly	5.5/10	N/A
Game Informer	7/10	N/A
GameFan	N/A	78%
GamePro	3/5	4/5
GameSpot	6.3/10	7.1/10
GameSpy	5.5/10	N/A
IGN	6.2/10	7.6/10
Next Generation	4/5	N/A
PC Accelerator	N/A	6/10
PC Gamer (UK)	N/A	93%
PC Gamer (US)	N/A	55%

The PC and Dreamcast versions received "average" reviews according to the review aggregation website Metacritic. Garrett Kenyon of NextGen said of the latter version, "While the minor bugs and graphic shortcomings keep this game from being a classic, TalonSoft has done an excellent job presenting a solid game with enough missions, options, and surprises to keep you coming back for more."

Edge gave the PC version nine out of ten, saying, "Certain aspects of the control system are clunky, and there are occasional graphical anomalies, but Hidden and Dangerous [sic] is such a sweeping success that it dwarfs any criticism. It's challenging, deep, acutely atmospheric and an intense adventure. PC gaming triumphs." However, Stephen Redwood of AllGame gave the same PC version three-and-a-half stars out of five, saying that it was "best described as boxed potential, but consumers don't pay for potential. They pay for results." Kevin "BIFF" Giacobbi of GameZone similarly gave the Gold Edition seven out of ten, saying that it "has potential - but until more patches are released and the multi-player online issue is solved, the best I would give it is just above average."

The PC version was a commercial success, with 350,000 units sold globally by May 2000. Sales had surpassed 1 million copies by 2007. It was particularly popular in the UK. According to PC Gamer US, most of the game's success derived from European markets. A writer for the magazine reported: "The game wasn't so fortunate in the States, where it received warm reviews but endured poor sales — partly because of intense competition from Rainbow Six, a lack of multiplayer options, and relatively little marketing exposure."

== Hidden & Dangerous: Fight for Freedom ==
Hidden & Dangerous: Fight for Freedom
- Developer: Illusion Softworks
- Publisher: TalonSoft
- Designer: Tomáš Pluhařík
- Programmer: Michal Bačík
- Platform: Windows
- Release: EU: December 10, 1999; NA: 28 January 2000
- Genre: Tactical shooter
- Modes: Single-player, multiplayer

An expansion was released in 1999, titled Hidden & Dangerous: Fight for Freedom in Europe and Hidden & Dangerous: Devil's Bridge in the US in 2000. This added new soldiers, weapons and missions in new locations including Poland, the Ardennes and postwar Greece.

=== Reception ===
Hidden & Dangerous: Fight for Freedom

Review scores
Publication	Score
AllGame	2.5/5
CNET Gamecenter	5/10
Computer Games Strategy Plus	1.5/5
Computer Gaming World	2/5
GamePro	1.5/5
IGN	6.4/10
PC Accelerator	4/10
PC Gamer (UK)	62%

Fight for Freedom received mixed reviews from critics, more unfavorable than the original game.

== Hidden & Dangerous Deluxe ==
A fully updated version of the game, Hidden & Dangerous Deluxe, was released for free as a commercial promotion for the sequel Hidden & Dangerous 2. It is still available as freeware.

== See also ==
- Video games in the Czech Republic
