= 2K Czech =

Czech video game developer

2K Czech, s.r.o.
- Logo used since 2008–2017
- Formerly: Illusion Softworks, a.s.; (1997–2008); 2K Czech, a.s.; (2008–2011)
- Type: Subsidiary
- Industry: Video games
- Predecessor: Vochozka Trading
- Founded: 1997; 29 years ago
- Founders: Petr Vochozka; Jan Kudera
- Defunct: 2017
- Fate: Merged into Hangar 13
- Headquarters: Brno, Czech Republic
- Number of locations: 2 studios (2017)
- Number of employees: ~100 (2017)
- Parent: 2K (2008–2017)
- Website: 2kczech.com

2K Czech, s.r.o. (formerly Illusion Softworks, a.s.) was a Czech video game developer based in Brno, founded as Illusion Softworks in 1997 by Petr Vochozka and Jan Kudera. The company was acquired by Take-Two Interactive in January 2008 and subsequently organised under the 2K label, becoming 2K Czech. The studio was merged into 2K's Hangar 13 in 2017. The developer is best known for creating the Mafia series.

== History ==
=== Illusion Softworks ===
Illusion Softworks was established in 1997 in Brno by Petr Vochozka and Jan Kudera. The company succeeded Vochozka's video game publisher, Vochozka Trading, through funding provided by Kudera's Cash Reform fund. The team initially comprised only five people, including Vochozka and Kudera. The team would expand to 40 people by the release of Mafia in 2002.

The studio provided assistance to Silver Wish Games for the production of Wings of War, Chameleon and Circus Empire.

In September 2007, several Illusions Softworks employees left the studio to found The Easy Company, which went on to produce MotorM4X (2008).

=== 2K Czech ===
On 8 January 2008, Take-Two Interactive announced that they acquired Illusion Softworks for an undisclosed sum. As a result of the acquisition, Illusion Softworks became part of Take-Two Interactive's 2K label and was renamed to 2K Czech. According to Take-Two Interactive's chief executive officer, Ben Feder, the agreement was made to expand the company's "strategic focus on owning high-value intellectual property". In July 2011, several employees that had left 2K Czech, along with former employees of Bohemia Interactive, founded Warhorse Studios, the studio behind 2018 video game Kingdom Come: Deliverance.

In September 2011, 40 employees were laid off from the company's Brno studio, with a few others made redundant at its Prague studio. Both studios previously housed a total of 200 employees, with around 25% of them being cut due to the layoffs. In November 2012, 2K Czech began hiring for a new, announced project; at the time, 2K Czech had 188 employees. There were reported creative differences between developers within 2K Czech, regarding the direction of the third installment of the Mafia series, which had started production between late 2010 and early 2011, with the project being rebooted around seven times between 2011 and 2013.

=== Succession by Hangar 13 ===
2K announced in January 2014 that 2K Czech's Prague office was to close, and that 10 employees (including the development of Mafia III) would be transferred to 2K's headquarters in Novato, California, with most other employees moved to 2K Czech's remaining Brno studio. Of an undisclosed number of employees that were laid off, some were later hired by Warhorse Studios. Mafia III's development was later shifted to 2K's new studio, Hangar 13, with 2K Czech receiving a supporting role. In 2017, the studio was merged into Hangar 13.

== Games developed ==
=== As Illusion Softworks ===
Year	Title	Platform(s)	Publisher	Notes
1997	Lurid Land	MS-DOS	Abadion Arts	
1998	Léto s Oskarem	MS-DOS	Vochozka Trading	
1999	Hidden & Dangerous	Microsoft Windows	TalonSoft	
2000	Flying Heroes	Microsoft Windows	Take-Two Interactive	Assisted Pterodon
2000	Hidden & Dangerous	Dreamcast	TalonSoft	
2000	Hidden & Dangerous: Fight for Freedom	Microsoft Windows	TalonSoft	
2002	Mafia	Microsoft Windows	Gathering of Developers	
2003	Hidden & Dangerous 2	Microsoft Windows	Gathering of Developers	
2003	Vietcong	Microsoft Windows	Gathering of Developers	Assisted Pterodon
2004	Hidden & Dangerous 2: Sabre Squadron	Microsoft Windows	Global Star Software	
2004	Mafia	PlayStation 2	Gathering of Developers	
2004	Mafia	Xbox	Gathering of Developers	
2004	Vietcong: Fist Alpha	Microsoft Windows	Gathering of Developers	Assisted Pterodon
2005	Vietcong 2	Microsoft Windows	2K Games	Assisted Pterodon
2005	Vietcong: Red Dawn	Microsoft Windows	Gathering of Developers	Assisted Pterodon

==== Cancelled ====
- Enemy in Sight (Microsoft Windows)

=== As 2K Czech ===
Year	Title	Platform(s)	Publisher	Notes
2010	Mafia II	Microsoft Windows	2K Games	
2010	Mafia II	PlayStation 3	2K Games	
2010	Mafia II	Xbox 360	2K Games	
2011	Top Spin 4	PlayStation 3	2K Sports	
2011	Top Spin 4	Xbox 360	2K Sports	
2016	Mafia III	Microsoft Windows	2K Games	Assisted Hangar 13
2016	Mafia III	PlayStation 4	2K Games	Assisted Hangar 13
2016	Mafia III	Xbox One	2K Games	Assisted Hangar 13
