= Modern Combat: Sandstorm =

2009 video game

- App Store icon
- Developer: Gameloft Montreal
- Publisher: Gameloft
- Producer: Marc-Andre Maurice
- Designers: Stanislas Dewavrin; Simon Vendette
- Programmer: Olivier Francoeur
- Artists: Arthur Hugot; Christophe Latour; Jean-Francois Leblond
- Series: Modern Combat
- Platforms: Android iOS webOS; Bada
- Release: iPhone; August 27, 2009 webOS; March 25, 2010 iPad; March 31, 2010; Bada; May 18, 2010; Android; November 25, 2010
- Genre: First-person shooter
- Modes: Single-player; Multiplayer

Modern Combat: Sandstorm is a 2009 first-person shooter video game developed by Gameloft Montreal and published by Gameloft for Android, iOS, webOS, and Bada. It is the first installment in the Modern Combat series and was followed by 2010's Modern Combat 2: Black Pegasus. The game is set in the Middle East.

== Gameplay ==
Gameplay screenshot

Sandstorm plays very similarly to Call of Duty 4: Modern Warfare. The game features ten missions in varied environments with different tasks for players to complete. The main enemies in the game are terrorists, and often, the player is accompanied by other soldiers who fight alongside them.

Movement is controlled by a virtual joystick on the screen, with sight and aim controlled by scrolling across the touchscreen. Players can also crouch, throw grenades, use iron sights, reload, change weapons and shoot using virtual buttons on the touchscreen. All controls can be customized from the main menu.

Online multiplayer was added to Sandstorm as a free update on January 28, 2010.

== Plot ==
Chief Warrant Officer Mike "Chief" Warrens returns from injury to active duty in the war against terrorism in the Middle East, and reunites with his old squad (Dozer, Ryan, Fox and Captain Jones). After completing a training run, the Chief joins the squad as they head out to destroy a terrorist radio outpost. After successfully completing the mission, they await evacuation in a disused hotel, but their extraction helicopter is shot down, and they are forced to defend the hotel before being safely extracted in a Humvee. During the mission, the squad notices how the terrorists seemed to be ready for them, coming to the conclusion that someone is leaking information.

They are then sent to a hospital to capture Abu Bahaa, a terrorist warlord. Chief and Dozer infiltrate the hospital through the sewer system, while Ryan and Jones wait outside. On reaching Bahaa's room, Chief discovers that they have been tricked; the hospital has been rigged with explosives, and a dummy has been placed in Bahaa's hospital bed. Chief and Dozer manage to escape unscathed, but outside, Jones has been injured and Ryan killed.

After Jones recovers, the squad breaks into a dockyard which Bahaa is using to store a large nuclear weapon. They discover that the terrorists have an enormous base underground, the entrance to which is hidden within a metal freight container. Chief is sent in to find the nuke. He encounters Bahaa inside, but is forced to allow him to escape so he can locate the bomb, which could be detonated by the terrorists at any minute. He eventually finds it and is able to secure it, while Bahaa flees and attempts to escape in a truck. The squad pursues him in a Humvee, chasing him out of the dockyard and through a train tunnel, before eventually flipping his truck as he reaches the highway.

The squad finds Bahaa lying by the truck, still alive, and Dozer prepares to secure him; however, Jones betrays the squad, killing Dozer and taking Fox hostage. Bahaa taunts Chief, saying that he is weak and he has no choice but to surrender, but Chief shoots Jones, who falls to the ground with Fox. Bahaa pulls two grenades from his jacket and prepares to blow up both Chief and himself, but Fox pulls him to the ground and tells Chief to run. Chief takes cover by the Humvee as both Bahaa and Fox are killed by the explosion.

Chief is subsequently promoted and becomes a hero. After returning to the US, he travels to Fox's residence and meets his wife, informing her of her husband's act of martyrdom and how he saved his life.

== Weapons ==
There are a variety of weapons in Modern Combat: Sandstorm. They range from two assault rifles (one with a higher rate of fire and movement speed, but lacking power and accuracy in comparison to the other) to an SMG, a shotgun, a sniper rifle, and an RPG. These weapons can be found stored in crates, often inside a side building along the path indicated by the missions.

Weapons include an M16A3, an MP5A2, an M870, an AK-47, an M24 SWS, an M249 and an RPG-7.

== High-definition version ==
A high-definition (HD) version of the game was released on March 31, 2010 for the iPad only. It features updated controls and graphics to make use of the iPad's larger screen.

== Reception ==
Reception

Aggregate score
| Aggregator | Score |
|---|---|
| GameRankings | 83% |

Review scores
| Publication | Score |
|---|---|
| 4Players | (iPhone) 63% (iPad) 47% |
| GameSpot | 8.5/10 |
| IGN | 8.3/10 |
| Jeuxvideo.com | 14/20 |
| Macworld | (iPhone) 4/5 (iPad) 3/5 |
| Pocket Gamer | 4/5 |
| TouchArcade | 4/5 |

Upon its release, the iPhone version received favorable reviews according to the review aggregation website GameRankings.

IGN's Mark Bozon called it "a game that pushes the system more than most gamers would expect possible [...] Sandstorm is a nice blending of both power and manageable touch controls, and ends up being way more game than I'd expect to find for a mere $6.99 [...] If you're willing to put a little time into learning the controls, Sandstorm is an impressive shooter, and proof that iPhone can handle FPS gaming." 148Apps was equally impressed, praising the graphics and saying, "Modern Combat features the most impressive 3D graphics on the iPhone. Not "some" of the best graphics, but the best, period. Textures are surprisingly detailed, character models are great, and there is no annoying pop-up." However, they were less impressed with the gameplay, saying, "the mission structure is simply too linear. Not only is the map very narrow with little choice of movement, but blatant green arrows also guide you through, preventing any hope of exploration."

AppSpy's Dave Flodine believed it to have set a new bar for first-person shooters on iDevices, saying, "Modern Combat: Sandstorm is the mold from which all future FPSs on the iPhone should be cast. The game is not without its issues, but by offering a very workable control scheme, superb presentation, and a solid play length, you couldn't ask for a better title to satisfy your iPhone FPS cravings." Pocket Gamer's Jon Jordan was similarly impressed, especially with the control schemes, saying, "what's really clever is the way Gameloft has shaped the gameplay of Modern Combat: Sandstorm to turn the limitations of the iPhone when it comes to first person shooters - notably the touch controls - into the game's strength." Slide To Play's Chris Reed believed the game set a new standard for iDevices, saying, "the gaming experience in Modern Combat: Sandstorm is a great one. The controls are the best we've seen in an iPhone FPS, the graphics are beautiful, and there's plenty of level variety. Sure, we've seen it all before, but not on the iDevice, and never for such a small price. If you like first-person shooters, buy this game."

Eli Hodapp of TouchArcade said, "Modern Combat: Sandstorm is an excellent game that raises the bar of what is to be expected of future first person shooters on the iPhone, as well as being added to the short list of games with fantastic on-screen controls [...] If you're at all interested in shooters, or are just looking for a great game to flex the muscles of your iPhone, look no further than Modern Combat: Modern Combat: Sandstorm." TouchGen's Matt Dunn was slightly less impressed than most other reviewers. He was critical of the AI ("there really isn't much in way of AI at all in Modern Combat") and the story ("the story in Modern Combat is bland at best, with a generic terrorist driven plot. There is a descent twist at the end, but the game makes no attempt to suck you in or connect you to your squad-mates at all, so it's hard to really care [...] the dialogue and storyline feel like they were written by someone who knows very little about the armed forces, but wrote a story based on other war games they've played"), but he praised the graphics ("the textures are crisp, and look great close up. The gun models and reloading/first-person character animations are awesome") and controls ("everything feels accessible and logical").
