= List of Gameloft games =

This is a list of video games published or developed by Gameloft. Platforms are listed in brackets.

== 0–9 ==
- 1 vs. 100 (keypad-based mobile phones, iOS)
- 9mm (Android, iOS)

== A ==
- Abracadaball (keypad-based mobile phones)
- Air Strike (Series 30+ embedded)
- Air Strike 1944: Flight for Freedom (keypad-based mobile phones)
- Alien Quarantine (keypad-based mobile phones, touchscreen Java ME phones, Android)
- American Popstar (mobile, Nintendo DS)
- Asphalt: Urban GT (keypad-based mobile phones)
- Asphalt: Urban GT 2 PlayStation Portable (PSP))
- Asphalt 3: Street Rules (keypad-based mobile phones, Symbian OS, N-Gage (service), Windows Mobile)
  - Asphalt 3: Street Rules 3D / Asphalt 3 3D: Street Rules (keypad-based mobile phones)
- Asphalt 4: Elite Racing (keypad-based mobile phones, iOS, N-Gage (service), Windows Mobile, BlackBerry OS, DSiWare)
- Asphalt 5 (Android, iOS, webOS, Symbian^3, Windows Phone 7, Bada)
- Asphalt 6: Adrenaline (keypad-based mobile phones, Android, iOS, OS X, Symbian^3, webOS, BlackBerry Tablet OS, Bada, Series 30+)
  - Asphalt 3D (Nintendo 3DS)
- Asphalt 7: Heat (Android, iOS, BlackBerry 10, Windows Phone 8, Windows 8)
- Asphalt 8: Airborne (Android, iOS, Windows Phone 8, Windows 8, BlackBerry 10, Windows 10 Mobile, Windows 10)
- Asphalt Legends (Android, iOS, Windows, Xbox One, Xbox Series X/S, Nintendo Switch, PlayStation 4, PlayStation 5)
- Asphalt: Audi RS 3 (iOS)
- Asphalt: Injection (PlayStation Vita)
- Asphalt Nitro (keypad-based mobile phones, Android)
- Asphalt Overdrive (Android, iOS, Windows Phone 8, Windows 8)
- Asphalt: Street Storm Racing (Android, iOS, Windows)
- Asphalt Xtreme (Android, iOS, Windows)
- Assassin's Creed (keypad-based mobile phones, touchscreen Java phones, Android)
- Assassin's Creed: Altaïr's Chronicles (Android, iOS, DS, Palm Pre)
- Assassin's Creed: Brotherhood (keypad-based mobile phones, touchscreen Java phones, Android)
- Assassin's Creed II (keypad-based mobile phones, touchscreen Java phones, Android)
- Assassin's Creed III (keypad-based mobile phones, touchscreen Java phones, Android)
- Assassin's Creed: Revelations (keypad-based mobile phones, touchscreen Java phones, Android)
- Avalanche Snowboarding (keypad-based mobile phones)

== B ==
- Backstab (Android, iOS)
- Bailout Wars (iOS)
- Battle for the White House (keypad-based mobile phones)
- Beowulf (based on the film of the same name; keypad-based mobile phones)
- Bikini Beach Volleyball (keypad-based mobile phones)
- Blades of Fury (Android, iOS, Palm Pre)
- Blitz Brigade (Android, iOS)
- Block Breaker 3: Unlimited (keypad-based mobile phones, Series 30+)
- Block Breaker Deluxe (keypad-based mobile phones, N-Gage, iOS, Nintendo Wii)
- Block Breaker Deluxe 2 (keypad-based mobile phones)
- Block Breaker Valentine (keypad-based mobile phones)
- "Blokus" (IOS)
- Bluey's Happy Snaps (Nintendo Switch, Nintendo Switch 2, PlayStation 4, PlayStation 5, Xbox One, Xbox Series X, Windows, Epic Game Store)
- Brain Challenge (keypad-based mobile phones, Android, N-Gage, iOS, Wii, DS, PlayStation 3 (PS3), Xbox, PSP)
- Brain Challenge Vol. 2: Stress Management (keypad-based mobile phones)
- Brain Challenge 3: Think Again! (keypad-based mobile phones, iOS)
- Brain Challenge 4: Breaking Limits (keypad-based mobile phones, Android)
- Bridge Odyssey (iOS)
- Brothers in Arms (N-Gage)
- Brothers in Arms: Art of War (keypad-based mobile phones)
- Brothers in Arms DS (DS)
- Brothers in Arms: Hour of Heroes (iOS, Palm Pre (webOS))
- Brothers in Arms 2: Global Front (Android, iOS)
- Brothers in Arms 3: Sons of War (Android, iOS, Windows Phone)
- Bubble Bash (keypad-based mobile phones, iOS)
- Bubble Bash 2 (keypad-based mobile phones, Series 30+)
- Bubble Bash 3 (keypad-based mobile phones, Android)
- Bubble Bash Mania (keypad-based mobile phones, Android)

== C ==
- Cannon Rats (keypad-based mobile phones)
- Captain America (based on the comic book superhero of the same name; Android, iOS)
- Carmen Sandiego (2025) (Netflix, PC, PlayStation 4, PlayStation 5, Nintendo Switch, Xbox One, Xbox Series X/S, IOS, Android)
- Cars: Fast as Lightning (Android, IOS, Windows Phone 8, Windows 8/8.1)
- Cars: Hotshot Racing (keypad-based mobile phones, Android)
- Castle of Magic (keypad-based mobile phones, iOS, KaiOS)
- Catz (keypad-based mobile phones)
- Chess and Backgammon Classics (iOS)
- Chessmaster (keypad-based mobile phones)
- City Mania (Android, iOS)
- Common Sense
- Cosmic Colony
- Crazy Campus / Campus Nights (keypad-based mobile phones)
- Crystal Monsters (Nintendo DSi)
- CSI: Crime Scene Investigation – The Mobile Game (keypad-based mobile phones)
- CSI: Miami – The Mobile Game (keypad-based mobile phones, iOS)
- CSI: Miami – The Mobile Game: Episode 2 (keypad-based mobile phones)
- CSI: NY – The Mobile Game (keypad-based mobile phones)
- CSI: Slots

== D ==
- Danger Dash (keypad-based mobile phones, Android, Series 30+, KaiOS)
- Date or Ditch (keypad-based mobile phones)
- Date or Ditch 2 (keypad-based mobile phones)
- Dead Rivals (Android, iOS)
- Deal or No Deal (based on the media franchise of the same name; United Kingdom)
- Dead Space Mobile (Android, IOS)
- Derek Jeter Pro Baseball 2006 (keypad-based mobile phones)
- Derek Jeter Pro Baseball 2007
- Derek Jeter Pro Baseball 2008
- Desperate Housewives: The Game (keypad-based mobile phones)
- Despicable Me: Minion Rush (Android, iOS)
- Detective Ridley and the Mysterious Enigma (keypad-based mobile phones, touchscreen Java phones)
- Diamond Rush (keypad-based mobile phones)
- Diamond Twister (keypad-based mobile phones, iOS)
- Diamond Twister 2 (keypad-based mobile phones, Android, Series 30+)
- Disney Dreamlight Valley (macOS, Steam, Microsoft Windows, iOS, Nintendo Switch, PlayStation 5, PlayStation 4, Xbox One, Xbox Series X/S)
- Disney Getaway Blast (Android, iOS, Microsoft Windows)
- Disney Magic Kingdoms (keypad-based mobile phones, Android, Microsoft Windows, iOS)
- Disney Princess Majestic Quest (Android, iOS, Microsoft Windows)
- Disney Speedstorm (Microsoft Windows, Nintendo Switch, PlayStation 4, PlayStation 5, Xbox One and Xbox Series X/S)
- DJ Mix Tour (iOS)
- Doodle Jump (keypad-based mobile phones)
- Dogz (keypad-based mobile phones, N-Gage)
- Dogz 2 (keypad-based mobile phones)
- Dogz 3D (keypad-based mobile phones)
- Dragon Mania (keypad-based mobile phones, Android)
- Dragon Mania Legends (Android, Microsoft Windows, iOS)
- Driver (iOS, Palm Pre)
- Driver: L.A. Undercover (keypad-based mobile phones)
- Driver: San Francisco (keypad-based mobile phones)
- Dungeon Hunter (iOS)
- Dungeon Hunter 2 (Android, iOS)
- Dungeon Hunter 4 (Android, iOS)
- Dungeon Hunter 5 (Android, Windows Phone, Windows 10, iOS, PlayStation 4, PlayStation Vita)
- Dungeon Hunter: Alliance (PlayStation Network, Mac OS X, PlayStation Vita)
- Dungeon Hunter Champions: Epic Online Action RPG (Android, Microsoft Windows, iOS)
- Dungeon Hunter: Curse of Heaven (keypad-based mobile phones)
- Dungeon Hunter III (keypad-based mobile phones, Android, iOS)

== E ==
- Earthworm Jim (keypad-based mobile phones, iOS, Palm Pre, DSiWare)
- Earthworm Jim HD (PlayStation Network, Xbox Live (Arcade)
- Eternal Legacy (Android, iOS)
- Everyday English Trainer (keypad-based mobile phones)

== F ==
- Fantasy Town (Android, iOS, keypad-based mobile phones)
- Fashion Icon (keypad-based mobile phones)
- Fast Five (keypad-based mobile phones, iOS, Android)
- Fast & Furious 6 (keypad-based mobile phones)
- Ferrari GT: Evolution (keypad-based mobile phones, iOS)
- Ferrari GT 2: Revolution (keypad-based mobile phones)
- Ferrari GT 3: World Track (keypad-based mobile phones)
- Ferrari World Championship (keypad-based mobile phones)
- Ferrari World Championship 2009: The Mobile Game (keypad-based mobile phones)

== G ==
- Gameloft Classics (Android)
- Gangstar 2: Kings of L.A. (keypad-based mobile phones, Android, BlackBerry, DSiWare)
- Gangstar City (keypad-based mobile phones, Android)
- Gangstar: Crime City (keypad-based mobile phones)
- Gangstar: Miami Vindication (keypad-based mobile phones, touchscreen Java phones, Android, iOS)
- Gangstar: New Orleans (Android, Microsoft Windows, iOS)
- Gangstar Rio: City of Saints (keypad-based mobile phones, touchscreen Java phones, Android, iOS, Xperia Play)
- Gangstar: Samurai (Japanese keypad-based mobile phones)
- Gangstar Vegas (Android, iOS)
- Gangstar: West Coast Hustle (Android, iOS, Palm Pre)
- Gods of Rome (Android, iOS)
- Golden Balls
- Green Farm (keypad-based mobile phones, Android, iOS, Adobe Flash, Windows Phone)
- Green Farm 2
- Green Farm 3 (keypad-based mobile phones, Android, iOS)
- Grey's Anatomy (keypad-based mobile phones)
- Guitar Rock Tour (keypad-based mobile phones, iOS, DS, DSiWare)
- Guitar Rock Tour 2 (keypad-based mobile phones, iOS)
- GT Racing: Motor Academy (Android, Symbian OS, iOS)
- GT Racing 2: The Real Car Experience (keypad-based mobile phones, Android, Microsoft Windows)

== H ==
- Harry Potter and the Deathly Hallows – Part 2 (keypad-based mobile phones)
- Hero of Sparta (keypad-based mobile phones, Android, iOS, PSP)
- Hero of Sparta II (iOS)
- Heroes of The Dark (iOS, Android, PC)
- Heroes: The Mobile Game (keypad-based mobile phones)
- High School Hook Ups (keypad-based mobile phones, Windows Phone)

== I ==
- Ice Age 4: Continental Drift (keypad-based mobile phones)
- Ice Age Adventures
- Ice Age Avalanche
- Ice Age: Scrat-ventures (keypad-based mobile phones, Android)
- Ice Age Village (keypad-based mobile phones, Android, iOS)
- Idle Siege (Android, iOS)
- Iron Blade (Android, iOS)
- Iron Man 2 (keypad-based mobile phones, iOS)
- Iron Man 3 (keypad-based mobile phones, Android, iOS)

== J ==
- James Cameron's Avatar: The Game (keypad-based mobile phones, Android, iOS, Palm Pre)
- Jurassic Park (2011) (keypad-based mobile phones, touchscreen Java phones)

== K ==
- Kingdoms & Lords (keypad-based mobile phones, Android)
- King Kong: The Official Mobile Game of the Movie (keypad-based mobile phones)
- King Kong Pinball (keypad-based mobile phones)
- KO Legends (KO Fighters) (keypad-based mobile phones)

== L ==
- Las Vegas Nights: Temptations in the City (keypad-based mobile phones)
- Legends of Exidia (DSiWare)
- Lego Legacy: Heroes Unboxed (Android)
- Lego Star Wars: Castaways (Apple Arcade)
- Let's Golf (iOS, Xperia Play, keypad-based mobile phones, Android, DS, PSP)
- Let's Golf 2 (iOS, Android, BlackBerry, macOS, Windows Mobile)
  - Let's Golf 3D (Nintendo 3DS)
- Let's Golf 3 (iOS, Android)
- Little Big City (keypad-based mobile phones, Android)
- Little Big City 2 (keypad-based mobile phones, Android)
- Littlest Pet Shop (keypad-based mobile phones, Android, iOS)
- Lost: The Mobile Game (based on the television series of the same name; keypad-based mobile phones, iOS)
- Lost Planet 2 (keypad-based mobile phones)
- Lumines Mobile (keypad-based mobile phones)

== M ==
- March of Heroes (keypad-based mobile phones)
- Massive Snowboarding (keypad-based mobile phones)
- Medieval Combat: Age of Glory (keypad-based mobile phones)
- Mega Tower Assault (keypad-based mobile phones)
- Men in Black 3
- Miami Nights: Singles in the City (keypad-based mobile phones, DS)
- Miami Nights 2: The City is Yours (keypad-based mobile phones)
- Midnight Bowling (keypad-based mobile phones, iOS, Wii)
- Midnight Bowling 2 (keypad-based mobile phones)
- Midnight Bowling 3 (keypad-based mobile phones)
- Midnight Bowling 3D (keypad-based mobile phones)
- Midnight Casino (keypad-based mobile phones)
- Midnight Darts (keypad-based mobile phones)
- Midnight Hold'em Poker (keypad-based mobile phones)
- Midnight Pool (keypad-based mobile phones, N-Gage, iOS, Wii)
- Midnight Pool 2 (keypad-based mobile phones, Android)
- Midnight Pool 3 (keypad-based mobile phones, Android)
- Midnight Pool 3D (keypad-based mobile phones, Windows)
- Midnight Pool 4 (keypad-based mobile phones, Android)
- Might and Magic (keypad-based mobile phones)
- Might and Magic II (keypad-based mobile phones, DSi)
- Mission: Impossible III (keypad-based mobile phones)
- Modern Combat 2: Black Pegasus (keypad-based mobile phones, Android, iOS, BlackBerry PlayBook)
- Modern Combat 3: Fallen Nation (Android, iOS)
- Modern Combat 4: Zero Hour (keypad-based mobile phones, Android, iOS, Windows Phone 8)
- Modern Combat 5: Blackout (Android, iOS, Windows Phone 8)
- Modern Combat: Domination (PS3, Mac OS X)
- Modern Combat: Sandstorm (Android, iOS, Bada, Palm Pre)
- Modern Combat: Versus (Android, Windows, iOS)
- Monster Life (iOS)
- Monsters University (keypad-based mobile phones, Android)
- My Life in New York (keypad-based mobile phones, Android)
- My Little Pony: Friendship Is Magic (Android, iOS, Windows 8)
- Mystery Mansion Pinball (keypad-based mobile phones)
- My Little Pony: Mane Merge (iOS, iPadOS, MacOS, VisionOS)

== N ==
- Naval Battle: Mission Commander (keypad-based mobile phones)
- New York Nights: Success in the City (keypad-based mobile phones, iOS)
- New York Nights 2: Friends For Life (keypad-based mobile phones, Android)
- NFL 2008 (DS)
- NFL 2009
- NFL 2010 (iOS, Palm Pre)
- NFL HD 2011
- NFL Pro 2012
- Night at the Museum: Battle of the Smithsonian (based on the film of the same name; keypad-based mobile phones)
- Nightmare Creatures (keypad-based mobile phones)
- Ninja Up (Series 30+)
- Nitro Racing (Series 30+)
- NitroStreet Racing (keypad-based mobile phones)
- NitroStreet Racing 2 (keypad-based mobile phones)
- Nitro Street Run 2 (KaiOS)
- N.O.V.A. Near Orbit Vanguard Alliance (keypad-based mobile phones, touchscreen Java phones, Android, iOS, PSP, PS3, Mac OS X, Palm Pre, Bada)
- N.O.V.A. 2: The Hero Rises Again (Android, iOS, BlackBerry PlayBook)
- N.O.V.A. 3 (keypad-based mobile phones, touchscreen Java phones, Android, iOS, BlackBerry PlayBook, BlackBerry 10, Windows Phone, Series 30+)
- N.O.V.A. Legacy (keypad-based mobile phones, touchscreen Java phones, Android, iOS)

== O ==
- Oktoberfest (keypad-based mobile phones)
- Open Season (keypad-based mobile phones)
- Order & Chaos Duels (Android, iOS)
- Order & Chaos 2: Redemption (Android, iOS, Windows Phone, Ouya)
- Order & Chaos Online (Android, iOS, Windows Phone, Ouya)
- The Oregon Trail (keypad-based mobile phones, iOS, Palm Pre)
- The Oregon Trail (Apple Arcade)
- The Oregon Trail 2: Gold Rush (keypad-based mobile phones)
- The Oregon Trail: American Settler (keypad-based mobile phones)

== P ==
- Paddington Run (Android, iOS)
- Paris Hilton's Diamond Quest (keypad-based mobile phones)
- Paris Nights (keypad-based mobile phones)
- Petz (keypad-based mobile phones)
- Pirates of the Seven Seas (keypad-based mobile phones)
- Planet Zero (keypad-based mobile phones)
- Platinum Solitaire (keypad-based mobile phones, iOS)
- Platinum Solitaire 2 (keypad-based mobile phones)
- Platinum Solitaire 3 (keypad-based mobile phones)
- Platinum Sudoku (keypad-based mobile phones, iOS)
- Platinum Sudoku 2 (keypad-based mobile phones, iOS)
- Pop Superstar / American Popstar (keypad-based mobile phones)
- Prince of Persia (2008 reboot; keypad-based mobile phones)
- Prince of Persia Classic (keypad-based mobile phones, PS3, Xbox Live Arcade, PlayStation Store)
- Prince of Persia: Harem Adventures (keypad-based mobile phones)
- Prince of Persia: The Forgotten Sands (keypad-based mobile phones)
- Prince of Persia: The Sands of Time (keypad-based mobile phones)
- Prince of Persia: The Two Thrones (keypad-based mobile phones)
- Prince of Persia: Warrior Within (keypad-based mobile phones, iOS)
- Pro Moto Racing (keypad-based mobile phones)
- Pro Rally Racing (keypad-based mobile phones)
- Pub Mania (keypad-based mobile phones)
- Puzzle Pets (keypad-based mobile phones, Android)

== R ==
- Rail Rider (keypad-based mobile phones)
- Rayman (keypad-based mobile phones, DSiWare, iOS, PSN, Windows, Palm Pilot)
- Rayman 2: The Great Escape (iOS)
- Rayman 3 (keypad-based mobile phones, N-Gage)
- Rayman Bowling (keypad-based mobile phones)
- Rayman Garden (keypad-based mobile phones)
- Rayman Golf (keypad-based mobile phones)
- Rayman Kart (keypad-based mobile phones)
- Rayman Raving Rabbids (keypad-based mobile phones)
- Rayman Raving Rabbids TV Party (keypad-based mobile phones)
- Real Tennis (iOS)
- Real Football 2004 (keypad-based mobile phones)
- Real Football 2005 (keypad-based mobile phones)
- Real Football 2006 (keypad-based mobile phones)
- Real Football 2007 (keypad-based mobile phones)
- Real Football 2008 (keypad-based mobile phones, DS)
- Real Football 2009 (keypad-based mobile phones, iPod, iOS, Alpha Potato, DS, DSiWare)
- Real Football 2010 (keypad-based mobile phones, iOS)
- Real Football 2011 (keypad-based mobile phones, iOS)
- Real Football 2012 (keypad-based mobile phones, Android, iOS)
- Real Football 2013 (keypad-based mobile phones, Android, iOS)
- Real Football 2014 (keypad-based mobile phones, Android)
- Real Football 2015 (keypad-based mobile phones, Android)
- Real Football 2016 (keypad-based mobile phones, Android)
- Real Football 2017 (keypad-based mobile phones, Android, iOS)
- Real Football 2018 (keypad-based mobile phones, Android)
- Real Football 2019 (Android)
- Real Football 2020 (Android)
- Real Football 2021 (Android)
- Real Football 2022 (Android)
- Rio Village
- Rise of Lost Empires (keypad-based mobile phones, iOS)
- Rival Knights (Android, iOS)
- Rival Wheels (keypad-based mobile phones, Android)

== S ==
- Sexy Blocks (keypad-based mobile phones)
- Sacred Odyssey: Rise of Ayden (Android, iOS)
- Sexy Poker 2009 (keypad-based mobile phones, Wii)
- Shadow Guardian (Android, iOS)
- Shark Dash (Android)
- Shrek Forever After (keypad-based mobile phones, iOS)
- Shrek Kart (Android, Palm Pre, iOS)
- Shrek Party (keypad-based mobile phones)
- Shrek the Third (keypad-based mobile phones)
- Siberian Strike (Palm OS, iOS)
- Siberian Strike: Episode I (keypad-based mobile phones)
- Siberian Strike: Episode II (keypad-based mobile phones)
- Siberian Strike X (Pocket PC, Windows, Windows Mobile)
- Siberian Strike 3D (Android, iOS)
- Six-Guns (Android, Windows, Windows Phone, iOS)
- Skater Nation (iOS)
- Skee-Ball (Android, Java ME mobile phones)
- Sky Gift (Series 30+)
- Smash It! (keypad-based mobile phones)
- Smash N Win (Series 30+)
- Snake (Series 30+, KaiOS)
- Sniper Champions (Android, iOS)
- SongPop
- Special Crime Unit: Blood on Campus (keypad-based mobile phones)
- Speed Devils (keypad-based mobile phones)
- Spider-Man: Toxic City (keypad-based mobile phones)
- Spider-Man: Ultimate Power (keypad-based mobile phones, Android)
- Spider-Man Unlimited (keypad-based mobile phones, Android)
- Sonic Runners Adventure (Android, iOS)
- Sonic Unleashed Mobile (keypad-based mobile phones, Android, iOS)
- Sonic Advance Mobile (keypad-based mobile phones, Android, iOS)
- Soul of Darkness (keypad-based mobile phones, Android, DSi)
- Starfront: Collision (Android, iOS)
- Star Battalion (Android, IOS, Symbian, Xperia Play)
- Surf's Up (keypad-based mobile phones)
- Sniper Fury (Android, iOS)
- Silent Ops (iOS)

== T ==
- The Oregon Trail 2021 (Apple Arcade, Nintendo Switch, PlayStation, Xbox, Steam, Epic Games Store).
- Tank Battles (PS3)
- Tetris (Series 30+)
- Tennis Open 2007
- Terminator Salvation (keypad-based mobile phones, iOS)
- The Adventure of Tintin: Secret of the Unicorn (keypad-based mobile phones, Android, iOS)
- The Blacklist: Conspiracy (Android, Windows, iOS)
- The Amazing Spider-Man (keypad-based mobile phones, touchscreen Java phones, Series 30+, Android, BlackBerry 10, iOS)
- The Amazing Spider-Man 2 (keypad-based mobile phones, touchscreen Java phones, Android, iOS)
- The Avengers: The Mobile Game (keypad-based mobile phones, Android)
- The Chronicles of Narnia: The Voyage of the Dawn Treader (keypad-based mobile phones)
- The Dark Knight Rises (keypad-based mobile phones, Android, Windows Phone, iOS)
- The Love Boat (keypad-based mobile phones, Android)
- The O.C. (based on the television series of the same name; keypad-based mobile phones)
- The Settlers (keypad-based mobile phones, iOS, Palm Pre)
- Tokyo City Nights (keypad-based mobile phones)
- Tom Clancy's Ghost Recon Advanced Warfighter 2 (keypad-based mobile phones)
- Tom Clancy's Ghost Recon: Future Soldier (keypad-based mobile phones, touchscreen Java phones, Android)
- Tom Clancy's Ghost Recon: Jungle Storm
- Tom Clancy's H.A.W.X (keypad-based mobile phones, Symbian, Android, iOS, Palm Pre)
- Tom Clancy's Rainbow Six 3 (keypad-based mobile phones)
- Tom Clancy's Rainbow Six: Lockdown (keypad-based mobile phones)
- Tom Clancy's Rainbow Six: Raven Shield (keypad-based mobile phones)
- Tom Clancy's Rainbow Six: Shadow Vanguard (Android, iOS)
- Tom Clancy's Rainbow Six Vegas (keypad-based mobile phones)
- Tom Clancy's Splinter Cell (keypad-based mobile phones)
- Tom Clancy's Splinter Cell: Chaos Theory (keypad-based mobile phones, N-Gage)
- Tom Clancy's Splinter Cell: Conviction (keypad-based mobile phones, touchscreen Java phones, Android, iOS)
- Tom Clancy's Splinter Cell: Double Agent (keypad-based mobile phones)
- Tom Clancy's Splinter Cell: Extended Ops (keypad-based mobile phones)
- Tom Clancy's Splinter Cell: Pandora Tomorrow (keypad-based mobile phones)
- Total Conquest (keypad-based mobile phones, Android)
- Totally Spies!: The Mobile Game (based on the television series of the same name; keypad-based mobile phones)
- Trivial Pursuits & Friends
- Tropical Madness (keypad-based mobile phones)
- Turbo Jet Ski 3D (keypad-based mobile phones)
- TV Show King (iOS, PS3, Wii)
- TV Show King Party (Wii)

== U ==
- Ultimate Spider-Man: Total Mayhem (BlackBerry Playbook, iOS, Android)
- Ultimate Street Football (keypad-based mobile phones)
- Uno (keypad-based mobile phones, Android, iOS, BlackBerry PlayBook, Windows Phone, BlackBerry 10, Palm Pre, Xbox 360 (Arcade), DSi, Wii, PS3)
- Uno and Friends (keypad-based mobile phones, Android, iOS, Windows Phone, BlackBerry 10, BlackBerry PlayBook, Palm Pre, Xbox 360 (Arcade), PS3, DSi, Wii)
- Uno Rush (XBLA [Xbox 360])
- Uno Spin (keypad-based mobile phones)
- Urban Crime (Android, iOS)

== V ==
- Vampire Romance (keypad-based mobile phones)

== W ==
- War Planet Online (Android, iOS)
- War of the Worlds (keypad-based mobile phones)
- Where's Waldo/Where's Wally (keypad-based mobile phones, developed under licensed of Classic Media)
- Wild Blood (video game) (Android, iOS)
- Wild West Guns (keypad-based mobile phones, Android, iOS, Wii)
- Wimbledon 2009
- Wonder Zoo (keypad-based mobile phones, Android)
- World at Arms (keypad-based mobile phones, Android, iOS)

== X ==
- XIII (keypad-based mobile phones)
- XIII: Covert Identity (keypad-based mobile phones)

== Z ==
- Zombie Infection (keypad-based mobile phones, Android, iOS)
- Zombie Infection 2 (keypad-based mobile phones, Android, iOS)
- Zombiewood (Nintendo Switch, keypad-based mobile phones, Android, iOS)
