= Spike Video Game Awards =

American award show (2003–2013)

- Awarded for: Outstanding achievements in the video game industry
- Location: Santa Monica, California / Las Vegas, Nevada
- Country: United States
- First award: December 3, 2003; 22 years ago
- Final award: December 7, 2013; 12 years ago
- Website: http://www.spike.com/event/vga

The Spike Video Game Awards (in short VGAs, known as the VGX for the final show) was an annual award show hosted by American television network Spike from 2003 that recognized the best computer and video games of the year. Produced by GameTrailers TV's Geoff Keighley, the show featured preview trailers for upcoming games, live music performances and appearances by popular performers in music, movies, and television.

The VGAs was held at various locations in Los Angeles and Santa Monica, California as well as Las Vegas, Nevada. Spike's only Video Game Hall of Fame award, given to The Legend of Zelda, was awarded at the 2011 awards show.

On November 15, 2013, Spike announced a new format under the name VGX, calling it "The next generation of the VGAs". The last award show, carrying this name, aired on December 7. Changes from the previous format included "in-depth extended demos of the next generation of games and interactive one-on-one interviews and panels in an intimate studio setting."

On November 10, 2014, Keighley announced a new awards show, The Game Awards, dropping the support from Spike.

== VGX ==
=== 2013 awards ===
The 2013 awards, the final awards show, was rebranded as VGX and held on December 7, 2013, and was hosted by Joel McHale. The show featured a different format from previous years. It featured extended demos of next-generation games, one-on-one interviews, and "a more intimate studio setting." Rather than airing live on Spike TV, the show was livestreamed online on Xbox One, Xbox 360, PlayStation 3, Twitch, Steam, iOS, and Android devices, as well as on GameTrailers.com and the websites of Spike, Comedy Central, MTV, MTV2, and BET. As with previous years, the show featured exclusive world premieres of game demos and trailers. The 2013 VGX premieres included Telltale Games' and Gearbox Software's collaboration Tales from the Borderlands, Tomb Raider: Definitive Edition (an Xbox One and PlayStation 4 port with graphical updates and all DLC included), Remedy Entertainment's Agents of Storm for iOS, Telltale Games' Game of Thrones, and independent developer Hello Games' No Man's Sky. The 2013 show also featured reveals of Titanfall, Thief, Quantum Break, South Park: The Stick of Truth, Broken Age, Dying Light, Tom Clancy's The Division, and The Witcher 3: Wild Hunt. Nintendo of America president Reggie Fils-Aimé demoed an upcoming Wii U game, Donkey Kong Country: Tropical Freeze, and Rockstar Games worked with the production team to produce a musical performance of the music of Grand Theft Auto V.

| Award | Winner | Nominees |
|---|---|---|
| Game of the Year | Grand Theft Auto V | BioShock Infinite; Super Mario 3D World; The Last of Us; Tomb Raider |
| Studio of the Year | Naughty Dog, The Last of Us | Irrational Games, BioShock Infinite; Rockstar North, Grand Theft Auto V; The Fullbright Company, Gone Home |
| Character of the Year | The Lutece Twins, BioShock Infinite | Lara Croft, Tomb Raider; Trevor Philips, Grand Theft Auto V; Naiee and Nyaa, Brothers: A Tale of Two Sons |
| Best Shooter | BioShock Infinite | Battlefield 4; Call of Duty: Ghosts; Metro: Last Light |
| Best Action-Adventure Game | Assassin's Creed IV: Black Flag | The Last of Us; Tomb Raider; Grand Theft Auto V |
| Best Sports Game | NBA 2K14 | FIFA 14; MLB 13: The Show; NHL 14 |
| Best Independent Game | Gone Home | Kentucky Route Zero; Papers, Please; The Stanley Parable |
| Best RPG | Ni no Kuni: Wrath of the White Witch | Final Fantasy XIV: A Realm Reborn; Fire Emblem Awakening; Pokémon X/Y |
| Best Fighting Game | Injustice: Gods Among Us | Divekick; Killer Instinct; Tekken Revolution |
| Best Driving Game | Forza Motorsport 5 | F1 2013; Grid 2; Need for Speed Rivals |
| Best DLC | Far Cry 3: Blood Dragon | Borderlands 2: Tiny Tina's Assault on Dragon Keep; Dishonored: The Knife of Dunwall; Mass Effect 3: Citadel |
| Best Xbox Game | Brothers: A Tale of Two Sons | BioShock Infinite; Grand Theft Auto V; Tomb Raider |
| Best PlayStation Game | The Last of Us | Grand Theft Auto V; Rayman Legends; Tomb Raider |
| Best Nintendo Game | Super Mario 3D World | Pikmin 3; Rayman Legends; The Wonderful 101 |
| Best PC Game | Gone Home | Battlefield 4; Papers, Please; The Stanley Parable |
| Best Handheld Game | The Legend of Zelda: A Link Between Worlds | Animal Crossing: New Leaf; Pokémon X/Y; Tearaway |
| Best Casual Game | Animal Crossing: New Leaf | Disney Infinity; Plants vs. Zombies 2: It's About Time; Skylanders: Swap Force |
| Best Mobile Game | Plants vs. Zombies 2: It's About Time | Angry Birds Star Wars; Infinity Blade III; Ridiculous Fishing |
| Best Voice Actor | Troy Baker as Joel, The Last of Us | Troy Baker as Booker DeWitt, BioShock Infinite; Steven Ogg as Trevor Philips, Grand Theft Auto V; Willem Dafoe as Nathan Dawkins, Beyond: Two Souls |
| Best Voice Actress | Ashley Johnson as Ellie, The Last of Us | Courtnee Draper as Elizabeth, BioShock Infinite; Camilla Luddington as Lara Croft, Tomb Raider; Elliot Page as Jodie Holmes, Beyond: Two Souls |
| Best Soundtrack | Grand Theft Auto V | BioShock Infinite; Ni no Kuni: Wrath of the White Witch; The Last of Us |
| Best Song in a Game | "Will the Circle Be Unbroken?" performed by Courtnee Draper and Troy Baker, BioShock Infinite | "A.D.H.D." by Kendrick Lamar, Grand Theft Auto V; "Sleepwalking" by The Chain Gang of 1974, Grand Theft Auto V; "Survival" by Eminem, Call of Duty: Ghosts |
| Most Anticipated Game | Titanfall | South Park: The Stick of Truth; Destiny; Watch Dogs; The Witcher 3: Wild Hunt |

== Spike Video Game Awards ==
=== 2012 awards ===
The 2012 VGAs (promoted as VGA 10 for the tenth anniversary) was held on December 7, 2012, at Sony Pictures Studios in Culver City, California. Samuel L. Jackson returned to host for a fourth time. This was the last year under the name "Spike Video Game Awards". For the first time, the awards were broadcast on Xbox Live. Live users could "play" the show as it aired live. Responses to poll questions were tabulated in real time on screen for the Xbox Live audience and users with Xbox SmartGlass devices got a unique second-screen experience that updated in real time alongside the show content. Additionally, Spike TV and Entertainment Weekly partnered to create the first-ever "Entertainment Weekly and Spike VGA Best Game of the Decade" award. Exclusive world premieres that debuted at VGA 10 include Naughty Dog's The Last of Us, Epic Games' Gears of War: Judgment, Obsidian Entertainment's South Park: The Stick of Truth, Konami's Castlevania: Lords of Shadow 2, Irrational Games' BioShock Infinite, Crystal Dynamics' Tomb Raider, Ubisoft's Assassin's Creed III: The Tyranny of King Washington, and 343 Industries' Halo 4: Spartan Ops. Two new games were announced, including Dark Souls II by FromSoftware, and a new game called The Phantom Pain (later revealed to be Metal Gear Solid V: The Phantom Pain). The event also had appearances from all past hosts of the VGAs except David Spade. The event featured musical performances by Linkin Park, Tenacious D, Gustavo Santaolalla and Wolfgang Gartner.

| Award | Winner | Nominees |
|---|---|---|
| Game of the Year | The Walking Dead | Assassin's Creed III; Dishonored; Journey; Mass Effect 3 |
| Studio of the Year | Telltale Games, The Walking Dead: The Game | 343 Industries, Halo 4; Arkane Studios, Dishonored; Gearbox Software, Borderlands 2 |
| Best Xbox 360 Game | Halo 4 | Assassin's Creed III; Borderlands 2; Dishonored |
| Best PS3 Game | Journey | Assassin's Creed III; Borderlands 2; Dishonored |
| Best Wii/Wii U Game | New Super Mario Bros. U | The Last Story; Xenoblade Chronicles; ZombiU |
| Best PC Game | XCOM: Enemy Unknown | Diablo III; Guild Wars 2; Torchlight II |
| Best Handheld/Mobile Game | Sound Shapes | Gravity Rush; LittleBigPlanet PS Vita; New Super Mario Bros. 2 |
| Best Shooter | Borderlands 2 | Call of Duty: Black Ops II; Halo 4; Max Payne 3 |
| Best Action Adventure Game | Dishonored | Assassin's Creed III; Darksiders II; Sleeping Dogs |
| Best RPG | Mass Effect 3 | Diablo III; Torchlight II; Xenoblade Chronicles |
| Best Multi-player Game | Borderlands 2 | Call of Duty: Black Ops II; Guild Wars 2; Halo 4 |
| Best Individual Sports Game | SSX | Hot Shots Golf: World Invitational; Tiger Woods PGA Tour 13; WWE '13 |
| Best Team Sports Game | NBA 2K13 | FIFA Soccer 13; Madden NFL 13; NHL 13 |
| Best Driving Game | Need for Speed: Most Wanted | DiRT: Showdown; F1 2012; Forza Horizon |
| Best Fighting Game | Persona 4 Arena | Dead or Alive 5; Street Fighter X Tekken; Tekken Tag Tournament 2 |
| Best Independent Game | Journey | Dust: An Elysian Tail; Fez; Mark of the Ninja |
| Best Adapted Video Game | The Walking Dead: The Game | Disney Epic Mickey 2: The Power of Two; Lego Batman 2: DC Super Heroes; Transformers: Fall of Cybertron |
| Best Song in a Game | "Cities" by Beck, Sound Shapes | "Castle of Glass" by Linkin Park, Medal of Honor: Warfighter; "I Was Born for This" by Austin Wintory, Journey; "Tears" by Health, Max Payne 3 |
| Best Original Score | Journey | Call of Duty: Black Ops II; Halo 4; Max Payne 3 |
| Best Graphics | Halo 4 | Assassin's Creed III; Dishonored; Journey |
| Best Performance by a Human Male | Dameon Clarke as Handsome Jack, Borderlands 2 | Dave Fennoy as Lee Everett, The Walking Dead: The Game; James McCaffrey as Max Payne, Max Payne 3; Nolan North as Captain Martin Walker, Spec Ops: The Line |
| Best Performance by a Human Female | Melissa Hutchison as Clementine, The Walking Dead: The Game | Emma Stone as Amanda Cartwright, Sleeping Dogs; Jen Taylor as Cortana, Halo 4; Jennifer Hale as Commander Shepard (female version), Mass Effect 3 |
| Best Downloadable Game | The Walking Dead: The Game | Fez; Journey; Sound Shapes |
| Best Social Game | You Don't Know Jack | Draw Something; Marvel: Avengers Alliance; SimCity Social |
| Best DLC | The Elder Scrolls V: Skyrim - Dawnguard | Mass Effect 3 – Leviathan; Borderlands 2 – Mechromancer Pack; Portal 2 – Perpetual Testing Initiative |
| Most Anticipated Game | Grand Theft Auto V | BioShock Infinite; South Park: The Stick of Truth; The Last of Us; Tomb Raider |
| Character of the Year | Claptrap, Borderlands 2 | Connor, Assassin's Creed III; Commander Shepard, Mass Effect 3; Master Chief, Halo 4; Raul Menendez, Call of Duty: Black Ops II |
| Best Game of the Decade | Half-Life 2 | Batman: Arkham City; BioShock; The Legend of Zelda: The Wind Waker; Mass Effect 2; Portal; Red Dead Redemption; Shadow of the Colossus; Wii Sports; World of Warcraft |

=== 2011 awards ===
The 2011 VGAs was held Saturday, December 10, 2011, at the Sony Pictures Studios in Culver City, California, hosted by Zachary Levi. The awards previewed world premieres of Tom Clancy's Rainbow Six: Patriots, Transformers: Fall of Cybertron, BioShock Infinite, Alan Wake's American Nightmare, Metal Gear Rising: Revengeance, Tony Hawk's Pro Skater HD, The Amazing Spider-Man, the exclusive PlayStation 3 game The Last of Us developed by Naughty Dog, Command & Conquer: Generals 2 from BioWare Victory, and Fortnite from Epic Games. New trailers for both Hitman: Absolution and Mass Effect 3 were aired during the show, as well as a pre-show announcement for Tekken Tag Tournament 2. Mark Burnett was the Executive Producer for the event, and for the first time, the VGAs aired live on MTV 2 (US), Spike.com (US) and Ginx TV (UK), in addition to Spike TV. The winners, as well as world premiere trailers, were announced during a pre-show red carpet live event hosted by GTTV's Amanda MacKay and Daniel Kayser. The 2011 VGAs also honored The Legend of Zelda franchise with its first ever "Video Game Hall of Fame Award". Another unique award at the 2011 VGAs was the NFL Blitz Cover Athlete award. This award, determined by live online voting during the event (just like Character of the Year), determined which NFL athlete would be on the cover of the EA Sports game, NFL Blitz. Appearances were by Charlie Sheen, Brooklyn Decker, Seth Green, Felicia Day, LL Cool J, Jason Biggs, Seann William Scott, Tony Hawk, will.i.am, Hulk Hogan, Stacy Keibler, Bellator MMA stars Eddie Alvarez and Michael Chandler, Blake Anderson, Adam Devine, Anders Holm, and game designers Cliff Bleszinski of Epic Games and Hideo Kojima of Konami. Musical performances were by The Black Keys and Deadmau5.

| Award | Winner | Nominees |
|---|---|---|
| Game of the Year | The Elder Scrolls V: Skyrim | Batman: Arkham City; The Legend of Zelda: Skyward Sword; Portal 2; Uncharted 3: Drake's Deception |
| Video Game Hall of Fame | The Legend of Zelda | N/A |
| Gamer God | Blizzard Entertainment | N/A |
| Studio of the Year | Bethesda Game Studios, The Elder Scrolls V: Skyrim | Naughty Dog, Uncharted 3: Drake's Deception; Rocksteady Studios, Batman: Arkham City; Valve, Portal 2 |
| Best Xbox 360 Game | Batman: Arkham City | Forza Motorsport 4; Gears of War 3; Portal 2 |
| Best PS3 Game | Uncharted 3: Drake's Deception | inFAMOUS 2; Killzone 3; LittleBigPlanet 2 |
| Best Wii Game | The Legend of Zelda: Skyward Sword | Epic Mickey; Kirby's Return to Dream Land; Lost in Shadow |
| Best PC Game | Portal 2 | Battlefield 3; Minecraft; The Witcher 2 |
| Best Handheld/Mobile Game | Super Mario 3D Land | Ghost Trick: Phantom Detective; Infinity Blade; Jetpack Joyride |
| Best Shooter | Call of Duty: Modern Warfare 3 | Battlefield 3; Gears of War 3; RAGE |
| Best Action Adventure Game | Batman: Arkham City | Assassin's Creed: Revelations; The Legend of Zelda: Skyward Sword; Uncharted 3: Drake's Deception |
| Best RPG | The Elder Scrolls V: Skyrim | Dark Souls; Deus Ex: Human Revolution; Dragon Age II |
| Best Multiplayer | Portal 2 | Battlefield 3; Call of Duty: Modern Warfare 3; Gears of War 3 |
| Best Individual Sports Game | Fight Night Champion | Tiger Woods PGA Tour 12: The Masters; Top Spin 4; Virtua Tennis 4 |
| Best Team Sports Game | NBA 2K12 | FIFA Soccer 12; NHL 12; MLB 11: The Show |
| Best Driving Game | Forza Motorsport 4 | DiRT 3; Driver: San Francisco; Need for Speed: The Run |
| Best Fighting Game | Mortal Kombat | The King of Fighters XIII; Marvel vs. Capcom 3: Fate of Two Worlds; WWE All Stars |
| Best Motion Game | The Legend of Zelda: Skyward Sword | Child of Eden; Dance Central 2; The Gunstringer |
| Best Independent Game | Minecraft | Bastion; Superbrothers: Sword & Sworcery EP; The Binding of Isaac |
| Best Adapted Video Game | Batman: Arkham City | Back to the Future: The Game; Captain America: Super Soldier; LEGO Star Wars III: The Clone Wars |
| Best Song in a Game | "Build That Wall (Zia's Theme)" by Darren Korb, Bastion | "Exile Vilify" by The National, Portal 2; "I'm Not Calling You a Liar" by Florence + the Machine, Dragon Age II; "Setting Sail, Coming Home (End Theme)" by Darren Korb, Bastion; "Want You Gone" by Jonathan Coulton, Portal 2 |
| Best Original Score | Bastion | Batman: Arkham City; Deus Ex: Human Revolution; Portal 2 |
| Best Graphics | Uncharted 3: Drake's Deception | Batman: Arkham City; LA Noire; RAGE |
| Best Performance by a Human Male | Stephen Merchant as Wheatley, Portal 2 | J.K. Simmons as Cave Johnson, Portal 2; Mark Hamill as The Joker, Batman: Arkham City; Nolan North as Nathan Drake, Uncharted 3: Drake's Deception |
| Best Performance by a Human Female | Ellen McLain as GLaDOS, Portal 2 | Claudia Black as Chloe Frazer, Uncharted 3: Drake's Deception; Emily Rose as Elena Fisher, Uncharted 3: Drake's Deception; Tara Strong as Harley Quinn, Batman: Arkham City |
| Best Downloadable Game | Bastion | Insanely Twisted Shadow Planet; Stacking; Iron Brigade |
| Best DLC | Portal 2: Peer Review | Fallout: New Vegas – Old World Blues; Mass Effect 2: Arrival; Mortal Kombat: Freddy Krueger |
| Most Anticipated Game | Mass Effect 3 | BioShock Infinite; Diablo 3; Halo 4; The Last Guardian |
| GameTrailers.com Trailer of the Year | Assassin's Creed: Revelations, E3 2011 Trailer | Batman: Arkham City, Hugo Strange Reveal Trailer; Dark Souls, Ignite 11 Debut Trailer; Dead Island, GDC 11 Cinematic Trailer; Deus Ex: Human Revolution, Purity First Infomercial; The Elder Scrolls V: Skyrim, In-Game Debut Trailer; Hitman: Absolution, E3 2011 Trailer; Prey 2, E3 2011 Trailer; Tomb Raider, E3 2011 Trailer; Uncharted 3: Drake's Deception, E3 2011 Trailer |
| Character of the Year | The Joker, Batman: Arkham City | Nathan Drake, Uncharted 3: Drake's Deception; Marcus Fenix, Gears of War 3; Wheatley, Portal 2 |
| NFL Blitz Cover Athlete | Ray Rice | Roddy White; Patrick Willis |

=== 2010 awards ===
The 2010 VGAs was held Saturday, December 11, 2010, in Los Angeles, California at the L.A. Convention Center and returned to using a host which was Neil Patrick Harris. Unlike previous years, all the awards were not awarded during the show. Several new games were announced which include BioWare's announcement of Mass Effect 3, Prototype 2, Insane from acclaimed filmmaker Guillermo del Toro, The Elder Scrolls V: Skyrim, Mortal Kombat featuring Kratos, Resistance 3, Portal 2, SSX: Deadly Descents, and Forza Motorsport 4. Batman: Arkham City had another CGI trailer debut and the first trailer of Uncharted 3: Drake's Deception aired during the awards. Appearances included AnnaLynne McCord, Thor: God of Thunder video game star Chris Hemsworth, Dane Cook, Olivia Munn, Dominic Monaghan, Michael Chiklis, Academy Award nominated film director Guillermo del Toro, Halo: Reach star and VGA nominee Nathan Fillion, Nick Swardson, Tony Hawk, and the cast from the hit series It's Always Sunny In Philadelphia, Danny DeVito, Charlie Day, Glenn Howerton, Kaitlin Olson, and Rob McElhenney. Musical performances included award-winning violinist Diana Yukawa, My Chemical Romance, and José González. The show featured use of augmented reality technology, conceived by Done and Dusted; with Lee Lodge, in partnership with Weider Design, Full Mental Jacket, and Orad.

| Award | Winner | Nominees |
|---|---|---|
| Game of the Year | Red Dead Redemption | Call of Duty: Black Ops; God of War III; Halo: Reach; Mass Effect 2 |
| Studio of the Year | BioWare, Mass Effect 2 | Blizzard Entertainment, StarCraft II: Wings of Liberty; Bungie, Halo: Reach; Rockstar San Diego, Red Dead Redemption |
| Best Xbox 360 Game | Mass Effect 2 | Alan Wake; Fable III; Halo: Reach |
| Best PS3 Game | God of War III | Heavy Rain; ModNation Racers; Red Dead Redemption |
| Best Wii Game | Super Mario Galaxy 2 | Donkey Kong Country Returns; Kirby's Epic Yarn; Metroid: Other M |
| Best PC Game | StarCraft II: Wings of Liberty | Fallout: New Vegas; Mass Effect 2; Sid Meier's Civilization V |
| Best Handheld Game | God of War: Ghost of Sparta | Metal Gear Solid: Peace Walker; Professor Layton and the Unwound Future; Super Scribblenauts |
| Best Shooter | Call of Duty: Black Ops | Battlefield: Bad Company 2; BioShock 2; Halo: Reach |
| Best Action Adventure Game | Assassin's Creed: Brotherhood | God of War III; Red Dead Redemption; Super Mario Galaxy 2 |
| Best RPG | Mass Effect 2 | Fable III; Fallout: New Vegas; Final Fantasy XIII |
| Best Multiplayer | Halo: Reach | Battlefield: Bad Company 2; Call of Duty: Black Ops; StarCraft II: Wings of Liberty |
| Best Individual Sports Game | Tiger Woods PGA Tour 11 | EA Sports MMA; Shaun White Skateboarding; UFC Undisputed 2010 |
| Best Team Sports Game | NBA 2K11 | FIFA 11; Madden NFL 11; MLB 10: The Show |
| Best Driving Game | Need for Speed: Hot Pursuit | Blur; ModNation Racers; Split/Second |
| Best Music Game | Rock Band 3 | Dance Central; DJ Hero 2; Def Jam Rapstar |
| Best Soundtrack | DJ Hero 2 | Guitar Hero 5; Guitar Hero: Warriors of Rock; Rock Band 3 |
| Best Song in a Game | "Far Away" by José González, Red Dead Redemption | "Basket Case" by Green Day, Green Day: Rock Band; "Black Rain" by Soundgarden, Guitar Hero: Warriors of Rock; "GoldenEye" by Nicole Scherzinger, GoldenEye 007 (2010); "Won't Back Down" by Eminem, Call of Duty: Black Ops; "Replay/Rude Boy Mashup" by Iyaz/Rihanna, DJ Hero 2 |
| Best Original Score | Red Dead Redemption | God of War III; Halo: Reach; James Bond 007: Blood Stone; Mass Effect 2 |
| Best Graphics | God of War III | Heavy Rain; James Bond 007: Blood Stone; Red Dead Redemption; Kirby's Epic Yarn |
| Best Adapted Video Game | Scott Pilgrim vs. the World: The Game | Lego Harry Potter: Years 1-4; Spider-Man: Shattered Dimensions; Star Wars: The Force Unleashed II; Transformers: War for Cybertron |
| Best Performance by a Human Male | Neil Patrick Harris as Peter Parker/Amazing Spider-Man, Spider-Man: Shattered Dimensions | Daniel Craig as James Bond, James Bond 007: Blood Stone/Goldeneye 007 (2010 video game); Gary Oldman as Sergeant Reznov, Call of Duty: Black Ops; John Cleese as Jasper, Fable III; Martin Sheen as the Illusive Man, Mass Effect 2; Nathan Fillion as Sergeant Edward Buck, Halo: Reach; Rob Wiethoff as John Marston, Red Dead Redemption; Sam Worthington as Alex Mason, Call of Duty: Black Ops |
| Best Performance by a Human Female | Tricia Helfer as Sarah Kerrigan, StarCraft II: Wings of Liberty | Judi Dench as M, James Bond 007: Blood Stone; Danica Patrick as Herself, Blur; Emmanuelle Chriqui as The Numbers Lady, Call of Duty: Black Ops; Felicia Day as Veronica Santangelo, Fallout: New Vegas; Jennifer Hale as Commander Shepard (female version), Mass Effect 2; Kristen Bell as Lucy Stillman, Assassin's Creed: Brotherhood; Yvonne Strahovski as Miranda Lawson, Mass Effect 2 |
| Best Downloadable Game | Costume Quest | Lara Croft and the Guardian of Light; Monday Night Combat; Scott Pilgrim vs. the World: The Game |
| Best DLC | Red Dead Redemption: Undead Nightmare | BioShock 2: Minerva's Den; Borderlands: The Secret Armory of General Knoxx; Mass Effect 2: Lair of the Shadow Broker |
| Best Independent Game | Limbo | Joe Danger; Super Meat Boy; The Misadventures of P.B. Winterbottom |
| Most Anticipated Game | Portal 2 | Batman: Arkham City; BioShock Infinite; Gears of War 3 |
| Character of the Year | Sgt. Frank Woods, Call of Duty: Black Ops | Kratos, God of War III; John Marston, Red Dead Redemption; Ezio Auditore da Firenze, Assassin's Creed: Brotherhood |
| Strongest Heroes of All Time | Master Chief, Halo series; Samus Aran, Metroid series; Marcus Fenix, Gears of War series | Mario, Super Mario series; Kratos, God of War series; Solid Snake, Metal Gear Solid series |
| Best Original Game | Red Dead Redemption | N/A |
| Best Zombie Game | Red Dead Redemption: Undead Nightmare | N/A |
| Best Dressed Assassin | Ezio Auditore da Firenze, Assassin's Creed: Brotherhood | N/A |
| Biggest Badass | Kratos, God of War III | N/A |

=== 2009 awards ===
The 2009 VGAs was held on December 12, 2009, at the Nokia Event Deck in Los Angeles, California and is the only VGAs that did not feature a host. It opened with a trailer announcing the sequel to Batman: Arkham Asylum. There were other exclusive looks at Prince of Persia: The Forgotten Sands, UFC 2010 Undisputed, Halo: Reach, Tron: Evolution, Medal of Honor, Crackdown 2, Bonanza, Spec Ops: The Line, Rock Band 3, Deadliest Warrior: The Game, and True Crime. Samuel L. Jackson previewed LucasArts newest upcoming Star Wars game, Star Wars: The Force Unleashed II. In addition, Green Day: Rock Band was announced and accompanied with a trailer. Appearances were made by Stevie Wonder, the cast of MTV's Jersey Shore, Green Day, and Jack Black, with live music performances by Snoop Dogg and The Bravery.

| Award | Winner | Nominees |
|---|---|---|
| Game of the Year | Uncharted 2: Among Thieves | Assassin's Creed II; Batman: Arkham Asylum; Call of Duty: Modern Warfare 2; Left 4 Dead 2 |
| Studio of the Year | Rocksteady Studios, Batman: Arkham Asylum | Infinity Ward, Call of Duty: Modern Warfare 2; Naughty Dog, Uncharted 2: Among Thieves; Valve, Left 4 Dead 2 |
| Best Independent Game | Flower | Osmos; Splosion Man; Trials HD |
| Best Xbox 360 Game | Left 4 Dead 2 | Batman: Arkham Asylum; Forza Motorsport 3; Halo 3: ODST |
| Best PS3 Game | Uncharted 2: Among Thieves | inFAMOUS; Killzone 2; Ratchet & Clank Future: A Crack in Time |
| Best Wii Game | New Super Mario Bros. Wii | MadWorld; Punch-Out!!; Wii Sports Resort |
| Best PC Game | Dragon Age: Origins | Left 4 Dead 2; Plants vs. Zombies; The Sims 3 |
| Best Handheld Game | Grand Theft Auto: Chinatown Wars | Mario & Luigi: Bowser's Inside Story; Professor Layton and the Diabolical Box; Scribblenauts |
| Best Shooter | Call of Duty: Modern Warfare 2 | Halo 3: ODST; Killzone 2; Left 4 Dead 2 |
| Best Action Adventure Game | Assassin's Creed II | Batman: Arkham Asylum; Brütal Legend; Uncharted 2: Among Thieves |
| Best RPG | Dragon Age: Origins | Borderlands; Demon's Souls; Mario & Luigi: Bowser's Inside Story |
| Best Multiplayer Game | Call of Duty: Modern Warfare 2 | Borderlands; Halo 3: ODST; Left 4 Dead 2 |
| Best Fighting Game | Street Fighter IV | BlazBlue: Calamity Trigger; Soulcalibur: Broken Destiny; Tekken 6 |
| Best Individual Sports Game | UFC 2009 Undisputed | Fight Night Round 4; Tiger Woods PGA Tour 10; Wii Sports Resort |
| Best Team Sports Game | NHL 10 | Madden NFL 10; NBA 2K10; FIFA 10 |
| Best Driving Game | Forza Motorsport 3 | Dirt 2; Gran Turismo PSP; Need for Speed: Shift |
| Best Music Game | The Beatles: Rock Band | DJ Hero; Guitar Hero 5; LEGO Rock Band |
| Best Soundtrack | DJ Hero | Brütal Legend; Guitar Hero 5; The Beatles: Rock Band |
| Best Original Score | Halo 3: ODST | Assassin's Creed II; Call of Duty: Modern Warfare 2; Uncharted 2: Among Thieves |
| Best Graphics | Uncharted 2: Among Thieves | Batman: Arkham Asylum; Call of Duty: Modern Warfare 2; Killzone 2 |
| Best Game Based On A Movie/TV Show | South Park Let's Go Tower Defense Play! | Ghostbusters: The Video Game; The Chronicles of Riddick: Assault on Dark Athena; X-Men Origins: Wolverine Uncaged Edition |
| Best Performance By A Human Male | Hugh Jackman as Wolverine, X-Men Origins: Wolverine | Bill Murray as Dr. Peter Venkman, Ghostbusters: The Video Game; Samuel L. Jackson as Afro Samurai / Ninja Ninja, Afro Samurai; Shia LaBeouf as Sam Witwicky, Transformers: Revenge of the Fallen; Vin Diesel as Richard B. Riddick, The Chronicles of Riddick: Assault on Dark Athena |
| Best Performance By A Human Female | Megan Fox as Mikaela Banes, Transformers: Revenge of the Fallen | Eliza Dushku as Rubi Malone, WET; Kristen Bell as Lucy Stillman, Assassin's Creed II; Tricia Helfer as Dare, Halo 3: ODST |
| Best Cast | X-Men Origins: Wolverine | Brütal Legend; Eat Lead: The Return of Matt Hazard; Ghostbusters: The Video Game; South Park Let's Go Tower Defense Play! |
| Best Voice | Jack Black for the voice of Eddie Riggs, Brütal Legend | Arleen Sorkin as Harley Quinn, Batman: Arkham Asylum; Claudia Black as Chloe Frazer, Uncharted 2: Among Thieves; Mark Hamill as The Joker, Batman: Arkham Asylum; Nolan North as Nathan Drake, Uncharted 2: Among Thieves |
| Best Downloadable Game | Shadow Complex | Battlefield 1943; Fat Princess; Plants vs. Zombies |
| Best DLC | Grand Theft Auto IV: The Ballad of Gay Tony | Fallout 3: Broken Steel; Fallout 3: Point Lookout; Grand Theft Auto IV: The Lost and Damned |
| Best Comedy Game | Eat Lead: The Return of Matt Hazard | N/A |
| Most Anticipated Game of 2010 | God of War III | BioShock 2; Mass Effect 2; StarCraft II: Wings of Liberty |

=== 2008 awards ===
The 2008 VGAs was held on December 14, 2008, at Sony Pictures Studios in Culver City. Hosted by Jack Black, the show featured previews of Brütal Legend, Dante's Inferno, Fight Night Round 4, Gears of War 2 "Combustion" map pack announcement and trailer, God of War III, Grand Theft Auto IV: The Lost and Damned, Mafia II, Pearl Jam's album Ten for Rock Band, Terminator Salvation, Uncharted 2: Among Thieves, and Watchmen: The End Is Nigh. Musical performances included 50 Cent, The All-American Rejects, Weezer, and LL Cool J.

| Award | Winner | Nominees |
|---|---|---|
| Game of the Year | Grand Theft Auto IV | Fallout 3; Gears of War 2; LittleBigPlanet; Metal Gear Solid 4: Guns of the Patriots |
| Best Action Adventure Game | Grand Theft Auto IV | Dead Space; Mirror's Edge; Metal Gear Solid 4: Guns of the Patriots |
| Studio of the Year | Media Molecule, LittleBigPlanet | Rockstar North, Grand Theft Auto IV; Harmonix, Rock Band 2; Bethesda Game Studios, Fallout 3 |
| Gamer God | Will Wright, creator of The Sims and Spore | N/A |
| Best Shooter | Gears of War 2 | Far Cry 2; Resistance 2; Left 4 Dead |
| Best Music Game | Rock Band 2 | Guitar Hero World Tour; Wii Music; SingStar |
| Best Soundtrack | Rock Band 2 | Grand Theft Auto IV; Guitar Hero World Tour; LittleBigPlanet |
| Best RPG | Fallout 3 | Fable II; Warhammer Online: Age of Reckoning; The World Ends with You |
| Best Independent Game Fueled By Dew | World of Goo | PixelJunk Eden; Braid; Audiosurf |
| Best Team Sports Game | NHL 09 | Madden NFL 09; NBA 2K9; FIFA Soccer 09 |
| Best Individual Sports Game | Shaun White Snowboarding | Tiger Woods PGA Tour 09; Wii Fit; Skate It |
| Best Game Based on a Movie or TV Show | Lego Indiana Jones: The Original Adventures | 007: Quantum of Solace; Star Wars: The Force Unleashed; Naruto: The Broken Bond |
| Big Name in the Game Male | Kiefer Sutherland as Sgt. Roebuck, Call of Duty: World at War | Ricky Gervais as Himself, Grand Theft Auto IV; Liam Neeson as Father, Fallout 3; Daniel Craig as James Bond, 007: Quantum of Solace |
| Big Name in the Game Female | Jenny McCarthy as Special Agent Tanya Adams, Command & Conquer: Red Alert 3 | Liv Tyler as Betty Ross, The Incredible Hulk; Eliza Dushku as Shaundi, Saints Row 2; Judi Dench as M, 007: Quantum of Solace |
| Best Xbox 360 Game | Gears of War 2 | Fable II; Fallout 3; Grand Theft Auto IV |
| Best PS3 Game | LittleBigPlanet | Metal Gear Solid 4: Guns of the Patriots; Resistance 2; Grand Theft Auto IV |
| Best Wii Game | Boom Blox | No More Heroes; Wii Fit; Super Smash Bros. Brawl |
| Best PC Game | Left 4 Dead | Spore; Crysis Warhead; Warhammer Online: Age of Reckoning |
| Best Multiplayer Game | Left 4 Dead | Gears of War 2; Resistance 2; Call of Duty: World at War |
| Best Fighting Game | Soulcalibur IV | Mortal Kombat vs. DC Universe; Super Smash Bros. Brawl; Dragon Ball Z: Burst Limit |
| Best Handheld Game | Professor Layton and the Curious Village | God of War: Chains of Olympus; Patapon; Castlevania: Order of Ecclesia |
| Best Driving Game | Burnout Paradise | Pure; Midnight Club: Los Angeles; Mario Kart Wii |
| Best Graphics | Metal Gear Solid 4: Guns of the Patriots | Sonic Unleashed; Fallout 3 |
| Best Original Score | Metal Gear Solid 4: Guns of the Patriots | Fallout 3; Spore; LittleBigPlanet |
| Best Male Voice | Michael Hollick as Niko Bellic, Grand Theft Auto IV | David Hayter as Old Snake, Metal Gear Solid 4: Guns of the Patriots; Stephen Fry as The Narrator, LittleBigPlanet; Jason Zumwalt as Roman Bellic, Grand Theft Auto IV |
| Best Female Voice | Debi Mae West as Meryl Silverburgh, Metal Gear Solid 4: Guns of the Patriots | Nathalie Cox as Juno Eclipse, Star Wars: The Force Unleashed; Paula Tiso as Silvia Christel, No More Heroes; Keeley Hawes as Lara Croft, Tomb Raider: Underworld |

=== 2007 awards ===
The 2007 VGAs aired December 9, 2007. Hosted by Samuel L. Jackson, the winners were announced ahead of the event which was held at the Mandalay Bay Events Center in Las Vegas. The show featured performances by Foo Fighters, Kid Rock, and exclusive world video game premieres of Borderlands, Gran Turismo 5 Prologue, Tom Clancy's Rainbow Six: Vegas 2, and TNA iMPACT!.

| Award | Winner | Nominees |
|---|---|---|
| Game of the Year | BioShock | Halo 3; Mass Effect; The Orange Box |
| Studio of the Year | Harmonix, Rock Band | Bungie, Halo 3; 2K Boston/2K Australia, BioShock; Valve, The Orange Box |
| Best Shooter | Call of Duty 4: Modern Warfare | BioShock; Halo 3; The Orange Box |
| Best RPG | Mass Effect | Eternal Sonata; Final Fantasy Tactics: The War of the Lions; Persona 3 |
| Best Military Game | Call of Duty 4: Modern Warfare | Ghost Recon Advanced Warfighter 2; Tom Clancy's Rainbow Six Vegas; World in Conflict |
| Best Individual Sports Game | Skate | Tiger Woods PGA Tour 08; Tony Hawk's Proving Ground; Virtua Tennis 3 |
| Best Handheld Game | The Legend of Zelda: Phantom Hourglass | Final Fantasy Tactics: The War of the Lions; Syphon Filter: Logan's Shadow; Puzzle Quest: Challenge of the Warlords |
| Best Graphics | Crysis | BioShock; Call of Duty 4: Modern Warfare; Mass Effect |
| Best Game Based on a Movie or TV Show | The Simpsons Game | The Lord of the Rings Online: Shadows of Angmar; Naruto: Rise of a Ninja; Stranglehold |
| Best Rhythm Game | Rock Band | Guitar Hero Encore: Rocks the 80s; Guitar Hero III: Legends of Rock; Jam Sessions |
| Best Driving Game | Colin McRae: Dirt | Forza Motorsport 2; Need for Speed: ProStreet; Project Gotham Racing 4 |
| Best Action Game | Super Mario Galaxy | Assassin's Creed; God of War II; Ratchet & Clank Future: Tools of Destruction |
| Best Team Sports Game | Madden NFL 08 | NBA 2K8; NHL 08; Winning Eleven: Pro Evolution Soccer 2007 |
| Best Soundtrack | Rock Band | BioShock; Guitar Hero III: Legends of Rock; Tony Hawk's Proving Ground |
| Breakthrough Technology | The Orange Box/Portal | Crysis; Halo 3 – Saved Films / Theatre Mode; Rock Band |
| Best Xbox 360 Game | BioShock | Halo 3; Mass Effect; The Orange Box |
| Best Wii Game | Super Mario Galaxy | The Legend of Zelda: Twilight Princess; Metroid Prime 3: Corruption; Super Paper Mario |
| Best PS3 Game | Ratchet & Clank Future: Tools of Destruction | Heavenly Sword; Uncharted: Drake's Fortune; Warhawk |
| Best PC Game | The Orange Box | BioShock; Crysis; World in Conflict |
| Best Original Score | BioShock | God of War II; Halo 3; Mass Effect |
| Best Multiplayer Game | Halo 3 | Call of Duty 4: Modern Warfare; Rock Band; The Orange Box |
| Most Addictive Video Game | Halo 3 | Guitar Hero III: Legends of Rock; Team Fortress 2; Wii Sports |

=== 2006 awards ===
The 2006 VGAs aired December 13, 2006, at the Galen Center in Los Angeles and were hosted by Samuel L. Jackson. The show featured a world premiere of Blizzard Entertainment's opening cinematic movie for its highly anticipated expansion set, World of Warcraft: The Burning Crusade. The event featured musical performances by Tenacious D and AFI and show appearances by 50 Cent, Eva Mendes, Sarah Silverman, Seth Green, Masi Oka, Hayden Panettiere, Yellowcard, Brandon Routh, Rachael Leigh Cook, Tony Hawk, Michael Irvin, Method Man, Maria Menounos, Tyrese Gibson, Xzibit, James Gandolfini, Kurt Angle, among others. In character as Stewie Griffin and Tom Tucker from Family Guy, Seth MacFarlane served as the voice of the VGAs.

| Award | Winner | Nominees |
|---|---|---|
| Game of the Year | The Elder Scrolls IV: Oblivion | Gears of War; Guitar Hero 2; Ōkami; Tom Clancy's Ghost Recon Advanced Warfighter |
| Studio of the Year | Epic Games, Gears of War | Clover Studio, Ōkami; Relic Entertainment, Company of Heroes; Bethesda Game Studios, The Elder Scrolls IV: Oblivion; Harmonix, Guitar Hero |
| Cyber Vixen of the Year | Alyx Vance, Half-Life 2: Episode One | Lara Croft, Tomb Raider: Legend; Princess Peach, Super Mario Bros.; Enrica, Tom Clancy's Splinter Cell Double Agent; Jen, Prey |
| Best Individual Sports Game | Tony Hawk's Project 8 | Rockstar Games Presents Table Tennis; Fight Night Round 3; Tiger Woods PGA Tour 07; Top Spin 2 |
| Best Team Sports Game | NBA 2K7 | Madden NFL 07; NCAA Football 07; FIFA 07; NHL 07 |
| Best Game Based on a Movie or TV Show | Lego Star Wars II: The Original Trilogy | The Godfather: The Game; Scarface: The World Is Yours; The Sopranos: Road to Respect; Family Guy Video Game! |
| Best Performance by a Human Male | Patrick Stewart as Emperor Uriel Septim VII, The Elder Scrolls IV: Oblivion | Seth MacFarlane as Peter Griffin, Stewie Griffin, and Brian Griffin, Family Guy Video Game!; Gerry Rosenthal as Jimmy Hopkins, Bully; Johnny Depp as Jack Sparrow, Pirates of the Caribbean: The Legend of Jack Sparrow; Kiefer Sutherland as Jack Bauer, 24: The Game |
| Best Supporting Male Performance | James Gandolfini as Tony Soprano, The Sopranos: Road to Respect | Seth Green as Chris Griffin, Family Guy Video Game!; James Woods as George Sheffield, Scarface: The World Is Yours; James Caan as Sonny Corleone, The Godfather: The Game; Philip Michael Thomas as Lance Vance, Grand Theft Auto: Vice City Stories |
| Best Performance by a Human Female | Vida Guerra as Femme Fatale, Scarface: The World Is Yours | Tia Carrere as Lin, Saints Row; Emmanuelle Vaugier as Nikki, Need For Speed: Carbon; Keely Hawes as Lara Croft, Tomb Raider: Legend; Rosario Dawson as Tina, Marc Eckō's Getting Up: Contents Under Pressure |
| Best Supporting Female Performance | Rachael Leigh Cook as Tifa Lockhart, Kingdom Hearts II | Elisha Cuthbert as Kim Bauer, 24: The Game; Brittany Murphy as Karen Light, Marc Eckō's Getting Up: Contents Under Pressure; Mila Kunis as Meg Griffin, Family Guy Video Game!; Lynda Carter as Female Nords / Female Orcs, The Elder Scrolls IV: Oblivion |
| Best Cast | Family Guy Video Game! | The Godfather: The Game; Scarface: The World Is Yours; Saints Row; The Elder Scrolls IV: Oblivion |
| Best Song | "Lights and Sounds" by Yellowcard, Burnout Revenge | "LocoRoco No Uta" by Nobuyuki Shimizu, LocoRoco; "Heavenly Star" by Genki Rockets, Lumines 2; "Helicopter" by Bloc Party, Mark Eckō's Getting Up: Contents Under Pressure and Burnout Revenge; "Summer Shudder" by AFI, Madden NFL 07 |
| Best Soundtrack | Guitar Hero II | Madden NFL 07; Scarface: The World Is Yours; Grand Theft Auto: Vice City Stories |
| Best Original Score | The Elder Scrolls IV: Oblivion | Bully; Electroplankton; Ōkami |
| Best Driving Game | Burnout Revenge | Need for Speed: Carbon; TOCA Race Driver 3; GTR 2 – FIA GT Racing Game |
| Most Addictive Game | The Elder Scrolls IV: Oblivion | Brain Age: Train Your Brain in Minutes a Day; Gears of War; Guitar Hero II; Company of Heroes |
| Best Fighting Game | Mortal Kombat: Armageddon | Tekken: Dark Resurrection; Dead or Alive 4; Street Fighter Alpha Anthology; God Hand |
| Best Action Game | Dead Rising | New Super Mario Bros.; Ōkami; Saints Row; Bully |
| Best Shooter | Gears of War | Black; Prey; Half Life 2: Episode One; Call of Duty 3 |
| Best Military Game | Company of Heroes | Tom Clancy's Ghost Recon Advanced Warfighter; Call of Duty 3; The Outfit; Battlefield 2142 |
| Best Graphics | Gears of War | Ōkami; Tom Clancy's Ghost Recon Advanced Warfighter; The Elder Scrolls IV: Oblivion; Company of Heroes |
| Best Handheld Game | New Super Mario Bros. | Brain Age: Train Your Brain in Minutes a Day; Grand Theft Auto: Vice City Stories; Tetris DS; LocoRoco |
| Best Multiplayer Game | Gears of War | Company of Heroes; Metal Gear Solid 3: Subsistence; Tom Clancy's Ghost Recon Advanced Warfighter; Tom Clancy's Splinter Cell Double Agent |
| Breakthrough Technology | Wii | PlayStation 3; Nintendo DS Lite; Electroplankton |
| Best RPG | The Elder Scrolls IV: Oblivion | Final Fantasy XII; Kingdom Hearts II; Valkyrie Profile 2: Silmeria |
| Best PC Game | Company of Heroes | Half Life 2: Episode One; Battlefield 2142; Star Wars: Empire at War; The Elder Scrolls IV: Oblivion |
| Best Wireless Game | SWAT Force | Diner Dash; Tower Bloxx; Super KO Boxing! |
| Critic's Choice (released after November 15, 2006, and before December 31, 2006) | The Legend of Zelda: Twilight Princess | Resistance: Fall of Man; Medieval II: Total War; Tom Clancy's Rainbow Six: Vegas; Wii Sports |
| Breakthrough Performance | Rosario Dawson as Tina, Marc Eckō's Getting Up: Contents Under Pressure | N/A |
| Character of the Year | Jack Sparrow portrayed by Johnny Depp, Pirates of the Caribbean: The Legend of Jack Sparrow | N/A |

=== 2005 awards ===
The 2005 VGAs was held December 10, 2005, at the Gibson Amphitheatre in Los Angeles. The first VGAs hosted by Samuel L. Jackson, the show featured world premieres of 24: The Game from 2K Games, Spy Hunter: Nowhere to Run from Midway Games, Star Wars: Empire at War from LucasArts, and Scarface: The World Is Yours, as well as a 25th anniversary comic tribute to Pac-Man from Namco. Musical performances were by 50 Cent, Def Leppard, and Missy Elliott, and show appearances by Charlize Theron, Kiefer Sutherland, Jack Black, Red Hot Chili Peppers, The Rock, Vin Diesel, Carson Daly, Donald Faison, Jaime Pressly, Josie Maran, Snoop Dogg, Xzibit, Carmen Electra, Natasha Bedingfield, and Dane Cook, among others.

| Award | Winner | Nominees |
|---|---|---|
| Game of the Year | Resident Evil 4 | Call of Duty 2; F.E.A.R.; God of War; World of Warcraft |
| Action Game of the Year | God of War | Resident Evil 4; Peter Jackson's King Kong: The Official Game of the Movie; The Warriors; 50 Cent: Bulletproof |
| Best Individual Sports Game | Tony Hawk's American Wasteland | Tiger Woods PGA Tour 06; SSX On Tour; Top Spin; Fight Night Round 2 |
| Best Team Sports Game | Madden NFL 06 | Blitz: The League; NBA 2K6; World Soccer Winning Eleven 8 International; NBA Street V3 |
| Cyber Vixen of the Year | Maria Menounos as Eva, James Bond 007: From Russia with Love | Charlize Theron as Æon Flux, Æon Flux; Jessica Alba as Invisible Woman, Fantastic 4; Traci Lords as Cassandra Hartz, True Crime: New York City; Laurence Bouvard as Joanna Dark, Perfect Dark Zero |
| Best Game Based on a Movie | Peter Jackson's King Kong: The Official Game of the Movie | Star Wars Battlefront II; The Warriors; James Bond 007: From Russia With Love; The Matrix: Path of Neo |
| Best Performance by a Human Male | Jack Black as Carl Denham, Peter Jackson's King Kong: The Official Game of the Movie | 50 Cent as himself, 50 Cent: Bulletproof; Michael Chiklis as Thing, Fantastic 4; Sean Connery as James Bond, James Bond 007: From Russia With Love; TC Carson as Kratos, God of War |
| Best Supporting Male Performance | Christopher Walken as Gabriel Whitting, True Crime: New York City | Eminem as himself, 50 Cent: Bulletproof; Dr. Dre as himself, 50 Cent: Bulletproof; Michael Clarke Duncan as Blackmore, The Suffering: Ties That Bind; P. Diddy as Dip, Marc Eckō's Getting Up: Contents Under Pressure |
| Best Performance by a Human Female | Charlize Theron as Æon Flux, Æon Flux | Naomi Watts as Ann Darrow, Peter Jackson's King Kong: The Official Game of the Movie; Josie Maran as Mia Townsend, Need for Speed: Most Wanted; Jessica Alba as Invisible Woman, Fantastic 4; Cornelia Hayes O'Herlihy as Fiona Belli, Haunting Ground |
| Best Supporting Female Performance | Traci Lords as Madam Cassandra Hartz, True Crime: New York City | Maria Menounos as Eva, James Bond 007: From Russia With Love; Rosario Dawson as Tina, Marc Eckō's Getting Up: Contents Under Pressure; Natasha Bedingfield as Elizabeth Stark, James Bond 007: From Russia With Love; Mariska Hargitay as Deena Dixon, True Crime: New York City |
| Best Original Song | "Maybe We Crazy" by 50 Cent, 50 Cent: Bulletproof | "Lights and Sounds" by Yellowcard, Burnout Revenge; "When I Get Angry" by Spider Loc, Madden NFL 06; "Getting Up Anthem: Part I" by Talib Kweli and Rakim, Mark Eckō's Getting Up: Contents Under Pressure; "Error Operator" by Taking Back Sunday, Fantastic 4 |
| Best Soundtrack | Guitar Hero | Grand Theft Auto: Liberty City Stories; 50 Cent: Bulletproof; Tony Hawk's American Wasteland; SSX On Tour |
| Best Original Score | We Love Katamari | Call of Duty 2; God of War; Indigo Prophecy; Perfect Dark Zero |
| Designer of the Year | David Jaffe, God of War | Rob Pardo, World of Warcraft; Michel Ancel, Peter Jackson's King Kong: The Official Game of the Movie; Shigeru Miyamoto, Nintendogs; Craig Hubbard, F.E.A.R. |
| Best Driving Game | Burnout Revenge | Gran Turismo 4; L.A. Rush; Forza Motorsport; Midnight Club 3: DUB Edition |
| Most Addictive Game | World of Warcraft | We Love Katamari; Lumines; Nintendogs; Meteos |
| Best Fighting Game | Fight Night Round 2 | Soulcalibur III; Tekken 5; Darkstalkers Chronicle: The Chaos Tower; Mortal Kombat: Shaolin Monks |
| Best First-Person Action | F.E.A.R. | Call of Duty 2; Far Cry Instincts; Battlefield 2; Perfect Dark Zero |
| Best Military Game | Call of Duty 2 | Brothers in Arms: Earned in Blood; Battlefield 2; Tom Clancy's Splinter Cell: Chaos Theory; SOCOM 3 U.S. Navy SEALs |
| Best Graphics | Resident Evil 4 | Peter Jackson's King Kong: The Official Game of the Movie; Call of Duty 2; F.E.A.R.; PGR 3 |
| Best Handheld Game | Lumines | Grand Theft Auto: Liberty City Stories; Nintendogs; Meteos; Burnout Legends |
| Best Multiplayer Game | Guild Wars | SOCOM 3 U.S. Navy SEALs; Battlefield 2; City of Villains; World of Warcraft |
| Best Breakthrough Technology | PlayStation Portable | Facial motion capture in NBA Live 06; Speech recognition in Nintendogs; Unreal Engine 3; Xbox 360 |
| Best RPG | World of Warcraft | Jade Empire; X-Men Legends II: Rise of Apocalypse; Dungeon Siege II; Star Wars Knights of the Old Republic II: The Sith Lords |
| Best PC Game | World of Warcraft | Battlefield 2; Call of Duty 2; F.E.A.R.; Sid Meier's Civilization IV |
| Best Wireless Game | Marc Eckō's Getting Up: Contents Under Pressure | Need for Speed: Underground 2; Massive Snowboarding; The Incredibles; Tom Clancy's Splinter Cell: Chaos Theory |
| Best Cast | Peter Jackson's King Kong: The Official Game of the Movie | N/A |

=== 2004 awards ===
The 2004 VGAs was held in Santa Monica, California on December 14, 2004, at the Barker Hangar and hosted by Snoop Dogg. The show featured exclusive world premiere game play and footage of Midway Games' Fear & Respect, The Godfather: The Game from John Singleton and Electronic Arts, and Need for Speed: Underground Rivals for the PlayStation Portable. Musical performances included Sum 41, Ludacris, and a special live performance by Snoop Dogg and the remaining members of The Doors performing "Riders on the Storm". Other performances included Snoop Dogg and Pharrell, Mötley Crüe, Busta Rhymes, and Method Man and Redman in the first-ever Def Jam: Fight For NY performance. Celebrity appearances included Brooke Burke, Samuel L. Jackson, Vin Diesel, Green Day, Giovanni Ribisi, Gabrielle Union, Tara Reid, Papa Roach, Tony Hawk, John Singleton, Danny Masterson, Frankie Muniz, Bai Ling, Ron Perlman, Bam Margera, Freddy Adu, Fabolous, Bobby Crosby, Barry Zito, and Michelle Rodriguez, among others.

| Award | Winner | Nominees |
|---|---|---|
| Game of the Year | Grand Theft Auto: San Andreas | Burnout 3: Takedown; Half-Life 2; Halo 2; Metal Gear Solid 3: Snake Eater |
| Best Game Based on a Movie | The Chronicles of Riddick: Escape from Butcher Bay | GoldenEye: Rogue Agent; Spider-Man 2; Star Wars: Battlefront |
| Best Performance by a Human Female | Brooke Burke as Rachel Teller, Need for Speed: Underground 2 | Judi Dench as M, Goldeneye: Rogue Agent; Carmen Electra as herself, Def Jam: Fight For NY; Jennifer Garner as Sydney Bristow, Alias; Heidi Klum as Katya Nadanova, James Bond 007: Everything or Nothing |
| Best Performance by a Human Male | Samuel L. Jackson as Sergeant Frank Tenpenny, Grand Theft Auto: San Andreas | Vin Diesel as Richard B. Riddick, The Chronicles of Riddick: Escape from Butcher Bay; Hugh Jackman as Gabriel Van Helsing, Van Helsing; Christopher Lee as Francisco Scaramanga, GoldenEye: Rogue Agent; Tobey Maguire as Spider-Man, Spider-Man 2 |
| Cyber Vixen of the Year | BloodRayne, BloodRayne 2 | Tina Armstrong, Dead or Alive Ultimate; Carmen Electra, Def Jam: Fight For NY; Luba Licious, Leisure Suit Larry: Magda Cum Laude; Rachel Teller (played by Brooke Burke), Need for Speed: Underground 2 |
| Best Driving Game | Burnout 3: Takedown | NASCAR 2005: Chase for the Cup; Need For Speed: Underground 2 |
| Best Sports Game | Madden NFL 2005 | ESPN NFL 2K5; NBA Ballers; Tiger Woods PGA Tour 2005; Tony Hawk's Underground 2 |
| Best Fighting Game | Mortal Kombat: Deception | Def Jam: Fight For NY; Dead or Alive Ultimate; Fight Night 2004; WWE SmackDown! vs. Raw |
| Best Action Game | Grand Theft Auto: San Andreas | Metal Gear Solid 3: Snake Eater; Ninja Gaiden |
| Best First-Person Action | Halo 2 | Doom 3; Far Cry; Half-Life 2; Unreal Tournament 2004 |
| Best Song in a Video Game | "American Idiot" by Green Day, Madden NFL 2005 | "I Do" by Chingy, Need for Speed Underground 2; "Pain" by Jimmy Eat World, Tony Hawk's Underground 2; "Lean Back" by Terror Squad, Need for Speed Underground 2; "Go" by Will.i.am, NBA Live 2005 |
| Best Soundtrack | Grand Theft Auto: San Andreas | GoldenEye: Rogue Agent; Halo 2; Katamari Damacy; Madden NFL 2005 |
| Designer of the Year | Jason Jones and Bungie, Halo 2 | Sam Houser and Rockstar North, Grand Theft Auto: San Andreas; Tomonobu Itagaki and Team Ninja, Ninja Gaiden; Hideo Kojima, Metal Gear Solid 3: Snake Eater; Alex Ward and Criterion, Burnout 3: Takedown |
| Best Military Game | Call of Duty: Finest Hour | Conflict: Vietnam; Full Spectrum Warrior; Rome: Total War; Warhammer 40,000: Dawn of War |
| Best PC Game | Half-Life 2 | Doom 3; Rome: Total War; The Sims 2 |
| Best Wireless Game | Might and Magic | CBS Sportsline Baseball 2004; Jamdat Sports NFL 2005; National Treasure |
| Best Graphics | Half-Life 2 | Doom 3; Halo 2; Ninja Gaiden |
| Best New Technology | Nintendo DS | Source Engine in Half-Life 2; GeForce 6800 Series; Spherex Xbox 5.1 Surround Sound System |
| Best Handheld | Metroid: Zero Mission | Astro Boy: Omega Factor; Mario Golf: Toadstool Tour; Pokémon FireRed Version |
| Best Massively Multiplayer Game | City of Heroes | EverQuest II; Final Fantasy XI |
| Best RPG | Fable | The Bard's Tale; Shin Megami Tensei: Nocturne; X-Men Legends |
| Most Addictive Game (viewer's choice) | Burnout 3: Takedown | City of Heroes; Donkey Konga; Katamari Damacy; The Sims 2 |
| Best Gaming Publication (fan favorite) | Game Informer | Electronic Gaming Monthly; Official PlayStation Magazine; GMR; Official Xbox Magazine |
| Best Gaming Web Site (fan favorite) | GameSpot | 1UP; GameSpy; IGN; Shack News |

=== 2003 awards ===
The 2003 Spike Video Game Awards was the first video game award show to be hosted by Spike TV. It was held at the MGM Grand Garden Arena in Las Vegas, Nevada on December 2, 2003, and aired on December 4. The event was hosted by both Funkmaster Flex and David Spade. It also featured appearances by Lil' Kim, Jaime Pressly, DMX, P.O.D., Orlando Jones, and Cedric the Entertainer. The event also featured a WWE tag team wrestling match with the superstars Rey Mysterio, Chris Jericho, Trish Stratus, and Victoria.

| Award | Winner | Nominees |
|---|---|---|
| Game of the Year | Madden NFL 2004 | Freedom Fighters; Grand Theft Auto: Vice City; Legend of Zelda: The Wind Waker; SOCOM II U.S. Navy SEALs; SSX 3; Star Wars Galaxies; Star Wars: Knights of the Old Republic; Tom Clancy's Splinter Cell; Tony Hawk's Underground |
| Best Sports Game | Tony Hawk's Underground | Dead or Alive Xtreme Beach Volleyball; ESPN NFL Football; Madden NFL 2004; NBA Live 2004; NBA Street Vol. 2; SSX3; Tiger Woods PGA Tour 2004; World Series Baseball 2K3; WWE SmackDown! Here Comes the Pain |
| Best Action Game | True Crime: Streets of LA | Freedom Fighters; Hitman 2: Silent Assassin; Max Payne 2: The Fall of Max Payne; Panzer Dragoon Orta; Return to Castle Wolfenstein; SOCOM II U.S. Navy SEALs; Star Wars Rogue Squadron III: Rebel Strike; XIII |
| Best Animation | Dead or Alive Xtreme Beach Volleyball | Grand Theft Auto: Vice City; The Getaway; Resident Evil Code: Veronica X; The Lord of the Rings: The Return of the King; True Crime: Streets of LA; Warcraft III: The Frozen Throne; Xenosaga Episode I: Der Wille zur Macht; XIII |
| Best Game Based on a Movie | Enter the Matrix | Crouching Tiger, Hidden Dragon; Harry Potter: Quidditch World Cup; The Hulk; Indiana Jones and the Emperor's Tomb; James Bond 007: Nightfire; The Lord of the Rings: The Return of the King; Star Wars Rogue Squadron III: Rebel Strike; Star Wars: Knights of the Old Republic; Tron 2.0 |
| Best Driving Game | NASCAR Thunder 2004 | Auto Modellista; Colin McRae Rally 3; F1 Career Challenge; F-Zero GX; The Getaway; Midnight Club II; MotoGP 2; The Simpsons: Hit & Run |
| Best Music | Def Jam Vendetta | Grand Theft Auto: Vice City; Madden NFL 2004; NBA Live 2004; NBA Street Vol. 2; SSX3; Tony Hawk's Underground; True Crime: Streets of LA; Wakeboarding Unleashed featuring Shaun Murray |
| Best Performance by a Human | Ray Liotta as Tommy Vercetti, Grand Theft Auto: Vice City | Christina Aguilera as herself, The Sims: Superstar; Christopher Walken as George, True Crime: Streets of LA; David Duchovny as XIII, XIII; DMX, Method Man, and more as themselves, Def Jam Vendetta; Giovanni Ribisi as Pvt Elder, Call of Duty; Jada Pinkett Smith as Niobe, Enter the Matrix; Jenna Jameson as Candy Suxxx, Grand Theft Auto: Vice City; Snoop Dogg as himself, True Crime: Streets of LA |
| Most Anticipated | Halo 2 | Dead or Alive Online; Doom 3; Driv3r; Fable; Full Spectrum Warrior; Gran Turismo 4; Half-Life 2; James Bond 007: Everything or Nothing; Medal of Honor: Rising Sun; Metal Gear Solid 3: Snake Eater; The Sims 2; Starcraft: Ghost |
| Most Addictive | Soulcalibur II | Anarchy Online: Shadowlands; Donkey Kong Country; ESPN NHL Hockey; Madden NFL 2004; PlanetSide; The Sims: Superstar; Viewtiful Joe; Virtua Fighter 4: Evolution |
| Best PC Game | Halo: Combat Evolved | Age of Mythology: The Titans; Battlefield 1942: The Road to Rome; Command & Conquer: Generals – Zero Hour; Freedom Fighters; Jedi Knight: Jedi Academy; Max Payne 2: The Fall of Max Payne; The Sims: Superstar; Warcraft III: The Frozen Throne |
| Best Online Game | Final Fantasy XI | Anarchy Online: Shadowlands; Battlefield 1942: The Road to Rome; EverQuest Online Adventures; Midnight Club II; Neverwinter Nights: Shadows of Undrentide; PlanetSide; The Sims Online; Star Wars Galaxies |
| Best Handheld Game | Tom Clancy's Splinter Cell | Advance Wars 2: Black Hole Rising; Castlevania: Aria of Sorrow; Final Fantasy Tactics Advance; Iridion II; Mega Man and Bass; Ninja Five-O; Rayman 3; Sonic Advance 2 |
| Best Fighting Game | WWE SmackDown! Here Comes the Pain | Backyard Wrestling: Don't Try This at Home; Bloody Roar 4; Capcom vs. SNK 2 EO; Def Jam Vendetta; Pride FC; Soulcalibur II; Virtua Fighter 4: Evolution; WWE WrestleMania XIX |
| Best First Person Action | Call of Duty | Battlefield 1942: Secret Weapons of WWII; Chrome; Halo: Combat Evolved; PlanetSide; Rainbow Six 3: Raven Shield; Return to Castle Wolfenstein: Tides of War; Tom Clancy's Ghost Recon: Island Thunder; XIII |
| Best Fantasy Game | Star Wars: Knights of the Old Republic | .Hack Part 1 Infection; Dark Cloud 2; EverQuest Online Adventures; Final Fantasy XI; Skies of Arcadia Legends; Star Wars Galaxies; The Legend of Zelda: The Wind Waker; Xenosaga Episode I: Der Wille zur Macht |

== Spike's Video Game Hall of Fame ==
Spike's Video Game Hall of Fame was established to recognize video game "franchises throughout history that have brought the industry to where it is today" – Casey Patterson, executive producer of the VGAs and executive vice president of event production for Viacom Media Networks Entertainment Group. The only inductee, due to the award show ending in 2013, was awarded at the ninth annual Spike Video Game Awards on December 10, 2011. The inaugural, and subsequently only, recipient was The Legend of Zelda franchise. Shigeru Miyamoto accepted the award.

| Year | Inductee |
|---|---|
| 2011 | The Legend of Zelda |

== Nomination ==
With the exception of the fan-voted "Most Anticipated Game", "Character of the Year", and a few other non-annual categories, the award nominees and winners are voted by an advisory council, featuring over 20 journalists from various media outlets. Fans, however, can vote online for which games they think should win each category.

VGX Advisory Council as of November 2013
| Member | Position | Publication |
|---|---|---|
| Andy McNamara | Editor in Chief | Game Informer |
| Ben Silverman | Writer | Yahoo! Games |
| Brian Crecente | News Editor | Polygon |
| Chris Grant | Editor | Polygon |
| Chris Kohler | Games Editor | Wired |
| Dale North | Editor in Chief | Destructoid |
| Darren Franich | Staff Writer | Entertainment Weekly |
| Francesca Reyes | Editor in Chief | Official Xbox Magazine |
| Geoff Keighley | Host/Executive Producer | GameTrailers TV with Geoff Keighley/Spike TV |
| Jeff Gerstmann | Editor in Chief | Giant Bomb |
| Jeremy Parish | Editorial Director | usgamer.net |
| Jerry Holkins | Co-Creator | Penny Arcade |
| Justin Calvert | Executive Editor | GameSpot |
| Logan Decker | Editor in Chief | PC Gamer |
| Lou Kesten | Reviewer/Editor | Associated Press |
| Ludwig Kietzmann | Editor in Chief | Joystiq |
| Mike Krahulik | Co-Creator | Penny Arcade |
| Mike Snider | Entertainment Reporter | USA Today |
| Russ Frushtick | Senior Editor | Polygon |
| Sophia Tong | Editor in Chief | GamesRadar |
| Stephen Totilo | Deputy Editor | Kotaku |
| Tal Blevins | VP Games Content | IGN |
| Tina Amini | Coordinator Editor | Kotaku |

== Reception ==
Video game journalism veteran Jeff Green has been vocal in his criticism of the Spike Video Game Awards. In his assessment of the 2010 VGAs, Green laments that Spike TV alienated viewers due to their decision to focus the awards on its own primary demographic, rather than the video game community at large. Green states that this leads to appearances by celebrities who "either didn't want to be or know why they were there." 2011 VGA host Zachary Levi recognized this and prior to hosting the event, told MTV in an interview that, "I'm happy to work on the VGAs on Spike and make the network happy, but I want to be respectful to the community of gamers because I am one myself. And [with] the humor involved, I want it to be smart, I want it to be honest, and accurate." Giant Bomb's Alex Navarro has also commented on the VGAs, questioning the importance of the awards themselves next to the VGA's focus on its exclusive reveals.

The 2011 VGAs were given similar criticisms. Kotaku reported that VGA nominees Mark Hamill and Tara Strong were disappointed that they were present at the event but their respective categories were not present at the show, only finding out the results of the "Best Performance by a Human Male" and "Best Performance by a Human Female" awards after the show. Wired.com writer Jason Schreier addressed Spike TV after the event in reference to food eating segments by Felicia Day and the host Zachary Levi having simulations of a sexual act performed on him. Schreier said, "It's not hard to find the root of the problem here: You think we're dumb. You think your audience is so stupid that they'll be amused by YouTube rants and health potion gags. You think we get our jollies out of watching girls bite cupcakes off conveyor belts. You think video game references make a good substitute for humor." Schreier also quoted Joystiq's Justin McElroy, who voiced his concern at many awards being shown together in a short montage. Praise was given for the handling of The Legend of Zelda's induction into the Hall of Fame including the video package of the franchise's releases and an appearance by creator Shigeru Miyamoto.

The 2013 VGX received considerable negative press after airing; much of the criticism was aimed at host McHale's insults towards the developers and the audience.

== Parodies ==
- The Video MADtv, highlighting the fictional 1st Annual Video Game Awards on June 21, 1977, hosted by Joe Namath (played by Michael McDonald) and Farrah Fawcett (played by Arden Myrin), musical guest The Jackson 5, and award presenter Mark Spitz (played by Ike Barinholtz). Pong and Asteroids were the only video games nominated for all of the awards presented, even though Asteroids wasn't released in the arcade until 1979. The categories shown in the sketch were "Best Graphics in a Video Game" (Asteroids wins), and "Most Realistic Sound in a Video Game" (Pong and Asteroids win in a tie). Bobby Lee accepts an award as a designer of Asteroids. Space Invaders is shown to display the future of video games, although it was released before Asteroids in 1978.
