= GT Racing =

GT Racing may refer to:

- GT racing, a form of circuit auto racing with automobiles that have two seats and enclosed wheels.
- GT Racing, a video game for the Super Famicom
- GT Racing: Motor Academy, a mobile racing video game published by Gameloft
