= NFL Series =

NFL Series could refer to:
In American football video games:

- EA's Madden NFL series
- Sega's NFL 2K series (1999-2004)
- NFL (series), a series of games by Gameloft

In toys:

- The McFarlane Sports Picks "NFL Series" of player figures (since 2001)
- Topps' "NFL Series" of trading cards, especially popular in the early 1990s
