= New York Knights =

New York Knights may refer to:

- New York Knights (arena football), an arena football team that played the Arena Football League during the 1988 season
- New York/New Jersey Knights, an American football team that played in the World League of American Football from 1991 to 1992
- New York Knights (rugby league), a rugby league football team based in New York City
- New York Knights, a fictional baseball team in the novel and film The Natural

New York Nights may refer to:

- New York Nights (album), a 1997 album by Benny Carter
- New York Nights (film), a 1929 film
- New York Nights 2: Friends For Life, an interaction-based action-adventure video game
