= Fast & Furious 6 (disambiguation) =

Fast & Furious 6 is a 2013 American action film directed by Justin Lin.

Fast & Furious 6 may also refer to:

- Fast & Furious 6 (soundtrack), a 2013 soundtrack album to the film
- Fast & Furious 6 (video game), a 2013 racing video game based on the film
