= GT Racing 2: The Real Car Experience =

2013 video game

- Cover art featuring the Ferrari F12berlinetta
- Developer: Gameloft Bulgaria
- Publisher: Gameloft
- Series: GT Racing
- Platforms: Android, iOS, Windows Phone, Microsoft Windows
- Release: November 13, 2013
- Modes: Single player, multiplayer

GT Racing 2: The Real Car Experience is a delisted 2013 mobile racing video game developed by Gameloft Bulgaria and published by Gameloft. It was the sequel to GT Racing: Motor Academy.

Gameloft quietly delisted and closed online servers of the game on December 1, 2023. Gameloft made no announcement. The game is no longer available on Play Store and App Store. The game can still be played but only in career mode and if the app was downloaded before the shutdown date.

== Gameplay ==
GT Racing 2: The Real Car Experience was a racing game similar to the series Real Racing, especially Real Racing 3 and the second installment in the Gameloft racing series as a continuation of GT Racing: Motor Academy. It provided 67 licensed cars from more than 30 manufacturers and 13 tracks. The single player mode included real controller ghosts similar to RR3. The single player mode was divided into 7 levels. Just like in RR3, you needed special cars to finish specific levels.

Players could purchase temporary boosts and permanent upgrades.

In multiplayer you were able to compete against other players from all over the world and create teams. There were more than 1,400 events in total with modes such as classic races, duels, knockout and overtaking. New challenges were added weekly. There were different weather conditions, driving aids and customization options.

== Reception ==
Derek C. Tillotson of Gamezebo gave the game 4 out of 5 stars and stated, "Despite its lack of price tag, this one is well worth a shot for those open to a new racing experience, this one is well worth a shot. It has all the elements and polish that those titles do. Not original, but still fun." Jon Mundy of Pocket Gamer gave the game 4 out of 5 stars and stated, "GT Racing 2 is a slightly less dazzling with a marginally less obnoxious IAP system. It's a very good racing game, and a great showcase for newer Apple hardware."

Reception

Review scores
Publication	Score
GameZebo	4/5
Pocket Gamer	4/5
