= Miami Nights: Singles in the City =

2006 video game

- Cover art for the Nintendo DS
- Developer: Gameloft Bucharest
- Publishers: DS: Ubisoft; J2ME, BlackBerry: Gameloft
- Director: Stanislas Dewavrin
- Producer: Manuel Figeac
- Designers: Matthieu Gosnet; Stefan Dan Foaie
- Programmers: Emil Dobre; Victor Bernot; Carlos Morales
- Artists: Arthur Hugot; Christophe Latour
- Series: Nights Series
- Platforms: J2ME, Nintendo DS, BlackBerry
- Release: November 1, 2006: Mobile; EU: November 1, 2006 Nintendo DS; NA: January 15, 2008; PAL: February 15, 2008 BlackBerry; WW: May 13, 2009 2: The City Is Yours; WW: August 5, 2009 Life in the Spotlight; NA: December 14, 2009; EU: January 1, 2010; JP: May 12, 2010
- Genre: Dating simulator
- Modes: Single-player, multiplayer

Miami Nights: Singles in the City is a dating simulation game for the J2ME Platform, Nintendo DS and BlackBerry. It is based on the successful Gameloft Nights franchise for mobile phones which has generated more than 4 million downloads.. The game is similar to New York Nights: Success in the City which is also a part of Gameloft's Nights series.

The American cover art depicts a woman wearing a dress, whereas the European/J2ME/BlackBerry cover art depicts the same woman in a bikini. There have been complaints about the game being slow after the language selection and taking a long time to load.

Other Miami Nights games include Miami Nights: Life in the Spotlight for DSiWare (released on December 14, 2009 in North America, and in 2010 internationally). and Miami Nights 2: The City is Yours, released on August 5, 2009 for BlackBerry.

== Sequel ==
The game had a sequel for the DSi & BlackBerry. For the DSi sequel, it is called Miami Nights: Life in the Spotlight, while for the BlackBerry sequel, it is called Miami Nights 2: The City is Yours. Both have the same title cover, they just differ in title.

== Reception ==
Reception

Aggregate score
Aggregator	Score
Metacritic	(DS) 48/100 (DSi) 42/100

Review scores
Publication	Score
IGN	(DS) 4/10
Nintendo Life	(DSi) 5/10
Nintendo World Report	(DS) 4/10
Official Nintendo Magazine	(DSi) 34%

The DS version of Singles in the City and its DSi sequel received "generally unfavorable reviews" according to the review aggregation website Metacritic.
