= TV Show King Party =

2008 video game

- Developer: Gameloft Montreal
- Publisher: Gameloft
- Platform: Wii
- Release: NA: October 28, 2008; PAL: November 13, 2008
- Genre: Quiz
- Modes: Single player, multiplayer

TV Show King Party is a quiz video game developed by Gameloft Montreal, published by Gameloft, and distributed by Ubisoft for the Wii. It is a follow-up to the WiiWare game TV Show King, released earlier in 2008, and contains 4000 new questions, 2 new subject categories and gameplay modes and 70% more localized questions compared to the downloadable game. Despite this game, a WiiWare sequel for the original, TV Show King 2 was created, and released in NA and Europe on December 12/25 2009 respectively.

== Gameplay ==
Up to four players, represented by Miis, compete against each other in a three-round trivia contest. Players are given timed multiple choice answers, with players selecting their answers on their screen with the Wii Remote, with the fastest lock-ins with the correct answer resulting in bigger prize money. Players can also take their chances for greater rewards by spinning a wheel with both good and bad outcomes after each round. At the end of the third round, the two highest scoring players are pitted against each other in the Final Duel to determine the winner.

This game features an elimination version, where a wrong answer eliminates you from the competition. There is also a 2-on-2 duel version and the return of the Quiz Attack for a solo player to see how many consecutive correct answers they can achieve.

== Cast ==
- Jerry (voiced by Jeremy Zafran)

== Reception ==
IGN gave the game a 5.8/10, believing that this expanded version of TV Show King does not live up to the expectations of a retail release, ultimately calling it a "blatant quick-buck product".
