= Sacred Odyssey: Rise of Ayden =

2011 video game

- Developer: Gameloft
- Producer: Thomas Aurick
- Programmer: Nie Dan
- Artists: Arthur Hugot, Rodrigo Rubilar
- Composer: Stanislas Dewavrin
- Platforms: iOS, Android
- Release: January 29, 2011
- Genre: Role-playing

Sacred Odyssey: Rise of Ayden is an iOS and Android role-playing video game developed by Gameloft and released on January 29, 2011.

== Gameplay ==
The protagonist must gain new items and abilities that allow them to solve environmental puzzles and find secret treasure chests. The ultimate goal is to return to a princess.

== Critical reception ==
The game has a Metacritic score of 84% based on 14 critic reviews.

AppSafari said " I was surprised at the amount of detail that went into Sacred Odyssey. The game is free yet runs seamlessly and offers a variety of challenges that have been laced with entertaining story telling. " SlideToPlay wrote "Sacred Odyssey uses Zelda's formula as a starting point, but innovates with some exceptionally smart puzzles and level design. " Gamepro said "This is a full-scale RPG adventure, and at the moment there isn't anything on the App Store that can compare to it. Zelda is what they aimed for, and Zelda is what they did. " IGN wrote "This is essentially a 3D Zelda for your iPhone. It lacks some of the infectious personality of Zelda, but offers some great adventuring and set pieces. The combat is simple without being simplistic." TouchArcade said "I had a ton of fun with Sacred Odyssey: Rise of Ayden, and highly recommend any Zelda fan give it a try. You'll have a great idea of whether or not you want to continue by the time you hit the pay wall, and hopefully you're somewhere with connectivity so you can proceed past it. " Modojo wrote " Gameloft didn't beat Zelda, not even close, but Sacred Odyssey has the necessary ingredients for a hit, including tons of action, a plethora of missions and some likeable characters, even if they sound like dopes." Touch Arcade said "Gameloft state that this is the most ambitious action RPG yet to grace the AppStore. Ambition is one thing, but delivering on that ambition is quite another. Unfortunately, Sacred Odyssey is lacking in too many areas, many of which are paramount for this genre to succeed."
