= Fast & Furious 6 (video game) =

2013 video game

- Developers: Kabam; Gameloft
- Publishers: Kabam; Gameloft
- Series: Fast & Furious
- Platforms: Android, iOS, J2ME, Windows Phone, Windows 8.1
- Release: iOS; April 19, 2013; Android; May 25, 2013; Windows Phone; November 8, 2014; Windows 8.1; December 1, 2014
- Genre: Racing
- Modes: Single player, multiplayer

Fast & Furious 6 is a racing video game based on the 2013 film. It was released in two different versions, the 2D by Gameloft and the 3D by Kabam for Android, iOS, J2ME, Windows Phone and Windows 8.1.

== Gameplay ==
=== 2D version ===
Fast & Furious 6 is Gameloft's second Fast & Furious game after Fast Five the Movie: Official Game. The game is played almost the same as its predecessor and features street races from various parts of the world. New features include the super borrowed boost from Asphalt 6: Adrenaline and helicopters that fire rockets into the player's car.

The main mode of the game is the story that follows the same structure as that of "Fast Five". It is made up of seven chapters each with five careers that must be completed to advance to the next chapter. As new cars progress, parts and characters are unlocked. Most of the race modes are the same as in the previous game and include normal races, as well as events involving drifting or eliminating opposing drivers. New modes include Collector, which involves taking enough money, and Wanted where the player has to avoid being arrested by the police.

=== 3D version ===
The game is played similarly to CSR Racing, and focuses on endurance racing, but also adds drift. Correctly timing your gears is essential in drag mode, and shifting too soon or too late (speeding) will result in slower times. Drift mode is essentially on-rails as well, relying on the player primarily for timely inputs.

While the game features a paid premium coin, everything can be forced and unlocked through regular play at no cost to the user.

== Reception ==
Reception

Aggregate score
| Aggregator | Score |
|---|---|
| Metacritic | 56/100 |

Review scores
| Publication | Score |
|---|---|
| Pocket Gamer | 4/5 |
| Multiplayer.it | 7.4/10 |
| Modojo | 3.5/5 |
| 148Apps | 3/5 |

Fast & Furious 6 received mixed or average reviews according to the review aggregator Metacritic.
