= Ferrari GT 3: World Track =

2012 video game

- Developer: Gameloft
- Publisher: Gameloft
- Series: Ferrari GT
- Platforms: BlackBerry, J2ME, Symbian
- Release: May 25, 2012
- Genre: Racing
- Mode: Single player

Ferrari GT 3: World Track is a 2012 racing video game developed and published by Gameloft for mobile phones. It is the third game in the Ferrari GT series.

== Gameplay ==
Ferrari GT 3: World Track gives players the opportunity buy and drive 57 Ferrari models, including the 250 Testa Rossa, the Ferrari FF and the SA Aperta. Stages consist of races which take place around the world and include Sydney, Hong Kong, and the Ferrari Fiorano Test Circuit. Like other games in the series, the player can race in career mode, where they gain fame and earn money to then buy more cars and improve existing cars or in a quick race mode. The game also features information from the Ferrari Encyclopedia as player tips.

== Reception ==
Reception

Review score
Publication	Score
Pocket Gamer	4.5/5
