= TV Show King =

2008 video game

- WiiWare cover
- Developer: Gameloft Montreal
- Publisher: Gameloft
- Platforms: Wii (WiiWare), iOS, PlayStation 3 (PlayStation Network)
- Release: WiiWare; TV Show King: NA: May 12, 2008; PAL: May 20, 2008; JP: June 10, 2008; TV Show King 2: NA: December 21, 2009; EU: December 25, 2009; iOS; November 3, 2008; PlayStation Store; August 6, 2009
- Genre: Quiz
- Modes: Single player, multiplayer

TV Show King is a quiz video game developed by Gameloft Montreal and published by Gameloft. It was released as one of the WiiWare launch titles in North and Latin America on May 12, 2008. It was also released later for iPhone OS in November 2008. The game was also released for PlayStation 3 on August 6, 2009, as a download from the PlayStation Store.

== Gameplay ==
Up to four players, represented by Miis in the Wii version, compete against each other in a three, six or nine round trivia contest. The 3000 trivia questions cover a wide range of subjects, ranging from geography and general knowledge to pop culture, with a number of region specific questions.

Players are given timed multiple choice answers, with players selecting their answers on their screen with the Wii Remote, with the fastest lock-ins with the correct answer resulting in bigger prize money. Players can also take their chances for greater rewards by spinning a wheel with both good and bad outcomes after each round. At the end of the last round, the two highest scoring players are pitted against each other in the Final Duel to determine the winner.

In the Final Duel, the two finalists are asked questions, each one worth one point. Points are awarded for correct answers. If both contestants answer the same question correctly, the point is awarded to whichever player locked in with the correct answer the fastest. The first contestant to win five points is declared the winner, and half of the runner-up's money is added to the amount the winner had before the Final Duel.

In addition to the main game, a shorter quiz called "Quiz Attack" is also available for solo players.

== Reception ==
TV Show King

Aggregate scores
Aggregator	Score	
Aggregator	iOS	Wii
GameRankings	78%	63%
Metacritic	N/A	65/100

Review scores
Publication	Score	
Publication	iOS	Wii
Edge	N/A	5/10
Eurogamer	N/A	4/10
GameSpot	N/A	7.5/10
GameZone	N/A	6.7/10
Hardcore Gamer	N/A	3/5
IGN	7.8/10	6.4/10
NGamer	N/A	60%
Nintendo Life	N/A	6/10
Official Nintendo Magazine	N/A	80%
Pocket Gamer	4/5	N/A

The Wii version received "mixed or average" reviews according to the review aggregation website Metacritic.

IGN praised the graphics and presentation, but had some concerns with elements of the gameplay. They also claimed that the game was "a far better multiplayer game than it is a solo experience".

Nintendo Life believed that most of what the player will enjoy about the game is from what other players will bring from outside the game. N-Europe also described it as "a fun title that can be played in short bursts every so often", praising its multiplayer and Mii usage. They also thought that the game was priced too steep at 1000 Wii Points, due to its lacklustre single-player mode. Edge said that the repetitive levels and basic look and feel had a large effect on the game's lifespan.

== Sequels ==
=== TV Show King Party ===
An expanded follow up to the game, called TV Show King Party, was released in North America on October 28, 2008 on the Wii. However, unlike the first game, it was a retail release.

=== TV Show King 2 ===
TV Show King 2

Aggregate score
Aggregator	Score
Metacritic	73/100

Review scores
Publication	Score
IGN	7.8/10
NGamer	60%
Nintendo Life	8/10
Official Nintendo Magazine	70%

A sequel, TV Show King 2, was released for the WiiWare in North America and Europe on December 21, 2009, and December 25, 2009, respectively. This sequel also has trophy support based on the player's accomplishments. This game had 8000 questions (into 12 different categories), and received a higher rating than its predecessor. Also, the game was priced at 800 Wii Points, instead of the predecessor's 1000. Some other additions to the game were Nintendo Wi-Fi Connection support and a Question Creator that let the player create download fan-made questions.

The game received above-average reviews, a bit more favorable than the original TV Show King, according to Metacritic.
