= Sniper Fury =

2015 video game

- Developer: Gameloft
- Publisher: Gameloft
- Platforms: Android; iOS; Tizen; Windows Phone; Microsoft Windows
- Release: WW: 2 December 2015
- Genre: First-person shooter
- Modes: Single-player, multiplayer

Sniper Fury is an online single player video game developed and published by Gameloft.

The action of Sniper Fury takes place in the near future. Technological development and geopolitical changes rendered former methods of resolving conflicts obsolete. Countries, corporations, and organizations employ services of highly trained professionals, who can eliminate specific targets with surgical precision.

== Gameplay ==
The game revolves around mechanics common for most sniper games, where the player has to eliminate a great majority of his targets from long distance. To complete a task, the player can use a variety of futuristic gadgets, e.g. a detection device that will tell the location of every nearby human, or stimulants, which will boost reflexes to supernatural levels.

== Release ==
Sniper Fury was released on 2 December 2015 for Android, iOS and Windows Phone. The Steam version was released on 13 June 2017.

== Reception ==
Reception

Aggregate scores
Aggregator	Score
GameRankings	50%
Metacritic	53/100

Review scores
Publication	Score
Gamezebo	2.5/5
Pocket Gamer	2.5/5

Sniper Fury received "mixed or average" reviews, according to review aggregator Metacritic.
