= Tokyo City Nights =

2008 video game

- Title screen of the Java version
- Developer: Gameloft Japan
- Publisher: Gameloft
- Series: Nights
- Platforms: Keypad-based mobile phones Wii (WiiWare)
- Release: JP: November 2008
- Genre: Life simulation
- Mode: Single-player

Tokyo City Nights is a life simulation video game developed by Gameloft Japan and published by Gameloft. It was released on November 4, 2008, in Japan for Wii (WiiWare) and for keypad-based mobile phones on November 14, 2008. It was Gameloft's first Japanese title.

The game involves players looking for a job and social and romantic success in Tokyo, Japan. It is part of Gameloft's Nights series, and unlike the rest of the series features a manga art style.
