= Guitar Rock Tour =

2008 video game

- European cover
- Developer(s): Gameloft
- Publisher(s): Gameloft
- Producer(s): Alexandre Besenval
- Designer(s): Shawn McGoogan; Bogdan Rapa
- Programmer(s): Jimmy Beaulieu; Emil Dobre
- Artist(s): Arthur Hugot; Christophe Latour
- Platform(s): Nintendo DS (DSiWare), iOS, Java ME
- Release: Nintendo DS: WW: November 4, 2008; DSiWare: EU: July 31, 2009; NA: August 17, 2009; iOS: WW: November 3, 2008
- Genre(s): Music

Guitar Rock Tour is a music video game developed and published by Gameloft for the Nintendo DS and iOS. It was released on November 4, 2008 and released on Nintendo's DSiWare in Europe on July 31, 2009 and in North America on August 17, 2009. It was also released for J2ME and was preloaded on some phones like the Sony Ericsson W595 and Nokia X3-00.

The game is played similarly to other music games such as Guitar Hero and Rock Band, with the player using either their finger or the stylus to tap along to incoming notes which move down the screen in time to the music. Two different instruments are available; guitar and drums. There are three difficulties: Easy, Medium and Hard. A sequel, Guitar Rock Tour 2, was released in 2009.

== Soundtrack ==
17 songs are included in the game, all of which are covers. These include:

- "Rock You Like a Hurricane" - Scorpions*
- "You Really Got Me" - Van Halen
- "Heart-Shaped Box" - Nirvana*
- "Message in a Bottle" - The Police*
- "Walk Idiot Walk" - The Hives
- "The River" - Good Charlotte
- "What's My Age Again?" - Blink-182
- "Smoke on the Water" - Deep Purple*
- "Beat It" - Michael Jackson
- "The Great Escape" - Boys Like Girls
- "In the Shadows" - The Rasmus
- "If Everyone Cared" - Nickelback
- "Who Knew" - P!nk
- "Underclass Hero" - Sum 41
- "Girlfriend" - Avril Lavigne
- "An Honest Mistake" - The Bravery*
- "Banquet" - Bloc Party*

Songs marked with an asterisk are featured in the mobile version. Also, exclusive to the mobile version are Iron Maiden's "Run to the Hills" and David Bowie's "Heroes".
