= Blitz Brigade =

2013 video game

- Developer: Gameloft Bucharest
- Publisher: Gameloft
- Platforms: Android, iOS, Windows Phone
- Release: iOS, Android; 9 May 2013; Windows Phone 8; 2 July 2014
- Genre: First-person shooter
- Modes: Multiplayer, single-player

Blitz Brigade was a multiplayer first-person shooter video game based on World War II developed and published by Gameloft for iOS, Android, and Windows Phone. It shut down their servers in December 2023.

== Gameplay ==
Blitz Brigade is an online team-based first-person shooter, with two "campaign" modes—multiplayer and training. The players could play as part of either Allies or Axis team. Training mode is an online single-player mode that consisted of 120 unlockable training missions. Multiplayer mode offered deathmatch and domination (capture) across 5 levels. A later update added a capture the flag mode. The players could play as one of 6 (originally, 5) unlockable classes. The game featured two in-game currencies and new weapons could be purchased.

== Reception ==
Reception

Aggregate score
Aggregator	Score
Metacritic	65/100

Review scores
Publication	Score
Gamezebo	2.5/5
Pocket Gamer	3.5/5
TouchArcade	3.5/5
Digital Spy	2/5

The iOS version received "mixed or average" reviews according to the review aggregation website Metacritic. Eric Ford of TouchArcade described it as enjoyable, but noted lack of game modes and freemium content. Rob Rich of Gamezebo described the game as good-looking and having elements for a great online mobile FPS, but criticized online server stability that he remarked as a key requirement. Jon Mundy of Pocket Gamer noted the framework for an excellent online FPS but criticized its freemium aspect and online stability. Andrew Stevens of 148Apps described the gameplay as fun and smooth, but lacking content. Scott Nichols of Digital Spy praised class-based gameplay and cartoony art style, but noted the poor connectivity and steep unlock requirements. Ford, Mundy and Nichols noted the game's close similarity to Team Fortress 2.
