= Let's Golf 2 =

2010 video game

- Android Gameloft Store cover
- Developer(s): Gameloft
- Publisher(s): Gameloft
- Series: Let's Golf
- Platform(s): iOS, Android, Mac OS X, Nintendo 3DS (Nintendo eShop), BlackBerry, Windows Mobile
- Release: July 22, 2010: iPhone July 22, 2010 iPad August 6, 2010 Android December 1, 2010 Mac OS X January 11, 2011 3DS eShop July 28, 2011 BlackBerry October 6, 2011 Windows Mobile November 16, 2011
- Genre(s): Sports
- Mode(s): Single-player

Let's Golf 2 is a sports game developed and published by Gameloft for iOS, Android, and Mac OS X in 2010, and for BlackBerry and Windows Mobile in late 2011. The game was ported for Nintendo 3DS' now-discontinued Nintendo eShop under the name Let's Golf 3D in July 2011. The same handheld version was ported to Japan for release on August 3, 2011.

== Reception ==
Reception

Aggregate score
Aggregator	Score	
Aggregator	3DS	iOS
Metacritic	62/100	91/100

Review scores
Publication	Score	
Publication	3DS	iOS
Eurogamer	5/10	N/A
GamePro	3.5/5 stars	N/A
GamesMaster	40%	N/A
Gamezebo	N/A	4.5/5 stars
IGN	9/10	9/10
NGamer	40%	N/A
Nintendo Life	6/10	N/A
Nintendo World Report	7/10	N/A
Official Nintendo Magazine	62%	N/A
Pocket Gamer	3.5/5 stars	4.5/5 stars

The iOS version received "universal acclaim", while Let's Golf 3D received "mixed" reviews, according to the review aggregation website Metacritic.
