= Midnight Pool =

2005 video game

- Midnight Pool's WiiWare game cover
- Developer: Gameloft Montreal
- Publisher: Gameloft
- Platforms: Mobile phone, Windows, N-Gage, Wii (WiiWare), iOS
- Release: Mobile Phone; April 8, 2005; WiiWare: EU: September 12, 2008; NA: August 18, 2008; JP: December 2, 2008; iOS: WW: October 22, 2008
- Genre: Sports simulation – pool
- Modes: Single-player, multiplayer

Midnight Pool is a sports simulation video game by Gameloft Montreal. The pool (pocket billiards) simulator was originally released for mobile phones. Versions with enhanced graphics were later released for Windows, WiiWare, and iOS and under the name Midnight Pool 3D for phones and the N-Gage platform. It is part of Gameloft's Midnight series, which includes Midnight Bowling, Midnight Casino and Midnight Hold'em Poker.

A sequel, Midnight Pool 2, was also later released for mobile devices.

== Gameplay ==
Midnight Pool features a story mode, a quick pick-up game arcade mode, a Challenge mode that revolves around sinking trick shots and offline multiplayer. There are three different variations of pool included in the game: 8-ball US rules, 8-ball UK rules and 9-ball, each available in all modes of play, including multiplayer.

The player chooses from a number of characters to compete as. The game starts with only a handful of characters available to choose from, with additional characters unlocked as the player progresses through the story mode. Additionally, players can also unlock new pool tables and cue colors. The game also features several different bars to play in, each with different challenges to take on.

=== Control ===
On the Wii, the game is controlled using the Wii Remote. Players aim their shot using either the pointer function of the Remote or the D-pad, with players miming the motion of a cue stick to hit the ball. Players can also pinpoint the precise point on their cue ball they will strike with their cue stick to add spin and to pull off trick shots.

== Reception ==
WiiWare World rated the WiiWare version an 8/10, calling it a "pretty-looking, fully featured [and] challenging pool simulator" with much more depth than Wii Play Pool. Official Nintendo Magazine gave the game 74%, commenting that it controls well, there is a nice selection of spin and that the game is great fun in multiplayer. However they did mark it down for the single player being too limited and a lack of online multiplayer. IGN gave the game 7/10, believing that the character designs were horrendous and that the voice overs were unbearable. They did praise the gameplay however, calling it an easy buy for fans of the sport.
