= Midnight Bowling =

2005 video game

- Midnight Bowling boxart
- Developer: Gameloft
- Publisher: Gameloft
- Platforms: Mobile phone, Wii (WiiWare), iOS
- Release: Mobile Phone november 7, 2005; WiiWare: EU: October 10, 2008; NA: October 6, 2008; JP: September 2, 2008; iOS: WW: November 14, 2008
- Genre: Sports
- Modes: Single-player, Multiplayer

Midnight Bowling is a bowling video game by Gameloft originally released for mobile phones. A version with enhanced graphics was also released for WiiWare, and under the name Midnight Bowling 3D for phones. It is part of Gameloft's Midnight series, which includes Midnight Pool, Midnight Casino and Midnight Hold'em Poker, and the game was also included in the Midnight Play! Pack compilation for the Nintendo DS. In November 2008, it was made available for the iOS via Apple's App Store.

A sequel, Midnight Bowling 2, was also later released for phones.

== Gameplay ==
The game features a story mode which revolves around the player competing in a hipster-themed bowling tournament. In addition, along with quick play single and multiplayer modes, the WiiWare version also features a Party Mode, in which players race across a game board by completing challenges such as trying to bowl their ball through a loop or past obstacles.

=== Control ===
On the Wii, players use the motion controls of the Wii Remote to bowl, miming the action to bowl in similar manner to Wii Sports Bowling.

== Reception ==
IGN gave Midnight Bowling for WiiWare a 4.9/10, highly praising the presentation and Party Mode, but felt Gameloft "dropped the ball" with the controls, citing an "awful swing mechanic" that leaves it "almost impossible to roll the ball consistently and successfully". WiiWare World gave it a 2/10, citing the same control issues as IGN and stating it "throws everything Wii Sports did so well control-wise out of the window, replacing it with its own very weird control scheme" that may leave the player "wondering if this is some sort of cartoonish bowling inspired game that is not really bowling".
