= Chess and Backgammon Classics =

- Developer: Gameloft
- Publisher: Apple
- Platforms: ipod nano, ipod classic, ipod
- Release: February 2008 (ipod) July 2008 (iPhone)

Chess and Backgammon Classics, retitled Chess Classics a week after release, is a video game by Gameloft for the iPod Nano (3rd and 4th generation), the iPod classic, and the iPod (5th generation). It was released in February 2008 for the iPod and later ported to ios July 10, 2008.

Chess and Backgammon Classics allows users to play chess against a human opponent, or a CPU opponent (difficulty settings are adjustable). The chess game also has a quiz mode, which challenges users to solve situation-specific problems, and also includes classic matches actually played by international chess masters.

The game also lets users play backgammon against a human opponent, or a CPU opponent (difficulty settings are adjustable).

== Reception ==
Macworld reviewed the iPhone version of the game, noting that the tutorials as limited to guiding you on how to move your pieces, and noted it "makes good use of the multi-touch interface." They also mentioned the 3d graphics didn't scale well.
