= Guitar Rock Tour 2 =

2009 music mobile video game

- Developer: Gameloft
- Publisher: Gameloft
- Platforms: iOS, Java ME, Symbian^3
- Release: WW: July 9, 2009
- Genre: Music

Guitar Rock Tour 2 is a music video game developed and published by Gameloft for the iOS, J2ME and Symbian^3. It was released on July 9, 2009, as the sequel to 2008's Guitar Rock Tour from the same developer.

The game is played similarly to other music games such as Guitar Hero and Rock Band, with the player tapping on the touchscreen along to incoming notes which move down the screen in time to the music. There are two instruments of choice (guitar and drums), and three difficulty levels (Easy, Medium and Hard).

== Soundtrack ==
18 songs are included in the game:

- "I Was Made for Lovin' You" - Kiss
- "Call Me" - In This Moment
- "Sweet Home Alabama" - Lynyrd Skynyrd
- "Paranoid" - Black Sabbath
- "Woman" - Wolfmother
- "Ziggy Stardust" - David Bowie
- "I Love Rock n' Roll" - Joan Jett and the Blackhearts
- "Helicopter" - Bloc Party
- "Born to Be Wild" - Steppenwolf
- "Gimme All Your Lovin'" - ZZ Top
- "(Don't Fear) The Reaper" - Blue Öyster Cult
- "I Wanna Rock" - Twisted Sister
- "Berlin" - Black Rebel Motorcycle Club
- "Nine in the Afternoon" - Panic! at the Disco
- "Breaking the Law" - Judas Priest
- "Every You Every Me" - Placebo
- "Story of My Life" - Social Distortion
- "My Sharona" - The Knack

Also, the Java version had exclusive songs that were mixed from the original game tracks. These songs are available only at the end of the chapter, in the career.

- "Their Law" - DJ Gargantua (Placebo - Every You Every Me|Judas Priest - Breaking the Law)
- "Sweet Zig" - DJ Gargantua (David Bowie - Ziggy Stardust|Lynyrd Skynyrd - Sweet Home Alabama)
- "Baghdad Love" - Vanilla Spice (Joan Jett and the Blackhearts - I Love Rock n' Roll|Black Sabbath - Paranoid)
- "Price Of Charm" - DJ Gargantua (Kiss - I Was Made for loving you baby|Wolfmother - Woman)
- "The Lot Of Screams" - Toni Greenbelt (ZZ Top - Gimme All Your Lovin'|Black Rebel Motorcycle Club - Berlin)
- "Rock The Reaper" - DJ Deejay
- "Abbu Dhabi" - Vanilla Spice
- "Space Nebraska" - Toni Greenbelt

Also, exclusive for the iOS version, additional songs in DLC format are also included.

- Seventies Pack:

- "Fortunate Son" - Creedence Clearwater Revival
- "Free Bird" - Lynyrd Skynyrd
- "Statesboro Blues" - The Allman Brothers

- Texas Pack:

- "Got Me Under Pressure" - ZZ Top
- "Legs" - ZZ Top
- "Tush" - ZZ Top
