= Siberian Strike =

Video game series

- Genre: Shooter
- Developer: Gameloft
- Publisher: Gameloft
- Creator: Arthur Hugot
- Composer: Romain Gauthier
- Platforms: iOS, Microsoft Windows, Windows Phone, Android, Java ME, Symbian, Pocket PC, Palm OS, Ludigames

Siberian Strike is a series of top-down shooters video games developed and published by Gameloft. Games in the series typically focus on classic "shoot'em'up" genre, set in an alternate world immediately after the end of World War II. The player flies into Siberian territory to face off against evil soviet forces. The goal of the game is the destruction of the Stalin-Bot, a crossbreed of Joseph Stalin and the future MIR space station, who owns the vodka producing company Stalinka Corp. The company is behind a communist invasion because they produce genetically engineered vodka that completely annihilates the willpower of those who drink it.

In terms of gameplay, Siberian Strike is a vertical-scrolling top-down-shooter, in the likes of popular Capcom's 1942 series. The player moves his plane around the screen in order to avoid the enemy projectiles while firing all available cannons and collecting the power-ups dropped by destroyed enemies. Most of the levels feature one or more bosses.

Siberian Strike is the original Palm OS version of the game. It was later ported in two parts for feature phones (Episode I & II) and remade in expanded form as Air Strike 1944: Flight for Freedom The game is currently playable for free on Gameloft's online gaming platform, Ludigames.

Released in 2006 for Pocket PC and Windows, Siberian Strike X is an upgraded reboot of the original version.

Released in 2009 for iOS and Android, the latest installment in the Siberian Strike series includes the story and features all the levels which were previously released in two parts as Siberian Strike and Siberian Strike: Episode II. The game is a complete remake featuring improved graphics in 3D, animations and additional content.

The game was generally positively received by mobile critics. Slide to Play and PocketGamer were two of the various outlets who gave glowing reviews.

== Games ==
These are the list of games in this series:

- Siberian Strike (Palm OS) 2001
- Siberian Strike: Episode I (J2ME) 2002
- Siberian Strike: Episode II (J2ME) 2003
- Air Strike 1944: Flight for Freedom (J2ME) 2006
- Siberian Strike X (Pocket PC, Windows, Windows Mobile) 2006
- Siberian Strike 3D (iOS) 2009
