= Brothers in Arms: Art of War =

2008 video game

- Developer(s): Gameloft
- Publisher(s): Gameloft
- Series: Brothers in Arms
- Platform(s): Java Platform, Micro Edition
- Release: NA: March 11, 2008
- Genre(s): Top-down shooter
- Mode(s): Single-player

Brothers in Arms: Art of War is a game developed and published by Gameloft for mobile phones, based on Gearbox's Brothers in Arms series.

== Gameplay ==
Typical gameplay screenshot.

Art of War is mainly a top-down shooter, featuring 13 missions in 3 campaigns, including Operation Market Garden. The game also includes parachute missions, rail shooter plane, tank and boat missions, as well as a destructible environment.

== Reception ==
Art of War received a score of 4 out of 5 from Pocket Gamer.
