= Might and Magic Mobile =

2004 video game

- Title screen
- Developer: Gameloft Beijing
- Publisher: Gameloft
- Series: Might and Magic
- Platforms: Keypad-based mobile phones Nintendo DSi
- Release: October 19, 2004 (mobile); February 1, 2010 (DSi)
- Genre: Action-adventure
- Mode: Single-player

Might and Magic Mobile is an action-adventure video game developed by Gameloft Beijing and published by Gameloft. It was released for keypad-based mobile phones on October 19, 2004 and for the Nintendo DSi on February 1, 2010.

== Gameplay ==
Might and Magic is an isometric action-adventure game that heavily involves puzzle-solving. As Ewan, the player is able to charge his sword to perform a special attack, use a grappling hook to reach high points, and use magic to freeze enemies, put out fires, and melt ice. As Lorean, they can use a bow and arrow to attack from a distance and double-jump. Kayn can transform into a bat to fly over gaps, ice, etc., turn into fog, and turn into a wolf (after which Ewan can get on him and jump higher).

== Plot ==
For centuries, the world of Erathia has been devastated by a war between humans and demons. To make matters worse, the king of the humans is being held prisoner by the demon armies. A young warrior named Ewan is sent to find the king by a mysterious nobleman named Mendes. On his way Ewan encounters Lorean, an elf archer, who helps him on his quest. Kayn, the captain of a group of mercenaries called the Unicorns, later appears and assists them in freeing the king.

The three then set out to kill the demon lord, who escapes after a fight with Ewan. The demon lord is confronted by Kayn; he attempts to make Kayn defect to the demons since the latter is a half-demon, but he reveals that he is not on the humans' side either; he says they are only his "tools". Ewan and Lorean overhear this and leave.

Mendes plans to reveal that Kayn is a half-demon so he will be able to become the king's right-hand man. Kayn overhears this and tells Ewan to meet him at the king's castle. He tells Ewan that Mendes is trying to prevent the return of the king, and has to be killed. Kayn confronts Mendes and kills him; a knight then attacks him and is also killed. Ewan refuses to help Kayn any further and the two get into a fight. They depart, and Kayn is arrested for killing Mendes. A year later, Lorean asks Ewan to help her rescue Kayn, and he agrees. They find Kayn heavily wounded; the demon lord appears and takes Kayn away. Ewan finds them and kills the demon lord and a three-headed dragon. Kayn apologizes for his actions. With the demons defeated, the humans start rebuilding Erathia.

== Prequel ==
A prequel titled Might and Magic Mobile II was released in October 2007. The player assumes the role of Louis, Ewan's father, in his quest to prevent the resurrection of an evil dragon named Daraka. The game was released in February 2010 for the Nintendo DSi under the name Legends of Exidia.

== Reception ==
GameSpot named Might and Magic Mobile the best mobile game of September 2004.
