= New York Nights: Success in the City =

2005 video game

- Developer: Gameloft Montreal
- Publisher: Gameloft
- Designers: Stainlas Dewarvin; Barbara Laurent
- Programmers: Dominique Canzeri; Stefan Podea; Simon Boucher<>Mathieu Latremouille
- Writers: Jess Kimball; Alexis Green-Painchaud
- Series: Nights
- Platforms: Mobile phone, iPhone
- Release: Mobile; 1 November 2005 iPhone: NA: 2009; PAL: 2009
- Genres: Action-adventure, life simulation
- Mode: Single-player

New York Nights: Success in the City is an action-adventure life simulation video game developed by Gameloft Montreal and published by Gameloft. It was released for button-operated mobile phones in 2005 and for iPhone in 2009. New York Nights is the first installment in the Nights series, and features two-dimensional (2D) graphics and is similar to The Sims series. A sequel, New York Nights 2: Friends For Life was later released for mobile phones and Android.

== Gameplay ==
=== Mobile ===
The player can use the directional pad (D-pad) or the numeric keypad to move the player character around. To chat with non-player characters, the player has to go near one and press the button on the center of the D-pad or the numeric button 5 when prompted to interact. There is a heavy amount of interactions that can be performed. Many activities and actions can be performed, such as eating pizza, watching television (TV) and getting a tan. These actions contribute to the four attributes of the character (health, beauty, humor, and culture). The player can visit facades commonly found in New York City.

=== iPhone ===
The player only taps on the screen to point the area where their avatar will go. To chat with non-player characters, the player has to tap the interaction button prompted whenever near one. There are many interactions that can be performed, such as chatting, flirting, and pranking. Many activities can be performed, depending on which location the player is at. Performing activities results in addition or subtraction of the player character's attributes (there are 16 of them). The player can visit the many famous landmarks of Manhattan.

== Reception ==
New York Nights received generally positive reviews from gaming companies such as IGN and Pocket Gamer which gave the game an 8.8/10 and 8/10 rating respectively. It also became subject to many game reviews.

"There is always something to do, it's easy to play (...) and advance the story, and the game has a wonderful sense of humor." -IGN

"Attractive, funny and definitely worth a fling - just don't tell the wife." -Pocket Gamer (8/10 silver award)

Other game reviewers such as GameSpot Asia gave the game an 8.2/10. Slidetoplay gave it a 3.0/5 and PCmag gave the game a 4.5/5 reviews saying that the game was "Excellent... Just as long as you go home and take the subway before 3:00am".
