= Fast Five (video game) =

2011 video game

- Developers: Gameloft Srl (3D); Gameloft Beijing (2D)
- Publisher: Gameloft
- Series: Fast & Furious
- Platforms: Android, iOS, J2ME, MacOS
- Release: Android, J2ME, iOS; April 20, 2011; MacOS; July 15, 2011
- Genre: Racing
- Modes: Single player, multiplayer

Fast Five is a racing video game developed and published by Gameloft for Android, iOS, J2ME and MacOS. The game is based on the 2011 film. It was released in two versions: 3D for smartphones and 2D for functional phones.

== Gameplay ==
The game is similar to the previous Fast & Furious mobile games as well as the series Asphalt. Tilt controls and a third-person view are used by default, but can be changed to a front view and touch controls. Acceleration is automatic and nitro boosters can be used to gain extra speed. There is also a rewind function that allows the player to go back in time to avoid accidents. Parts sets that create road hazards occasionally occur during races.

The main mode of the game is the career mode that follows the story of the movie. It is made up of ten chapters each containing a new track as well as various events. Each chapter begins with a history race and once the additional race events are completed they are available. There are a few different career modes: normal races and time attacks, eliminations where the player has to push opponents off the road, drag races that have to do with displacements and drift races where the player has to drift. as much as possible. To advance to the next chapter, fame points must be earned by performing well in events.

There is also a multiplayer mode that allows races with up to ten players. It can be played online as well as through Wi-Fi or bluetooth.

== Reception ==
Reception

Aggregate score
Aggregator	Score
Metacritic	81/100

Review scores
Publication	Score
Vandal	7.5/10
148Apps	3.5/5
Multiplayer.it	7.0/10

The iOS version of Fast Five received generally favorable reviews and scored 81 out of 100 according to Metacritic.

Slide to Play wrote: "Fast Five is both an amazing licensed movie game and one of the best racing action games on the App Store."

AppGamer wrote: "Far from being another throwaway license, Fast Five takes the best of the movie and the best of other racing games and creates something unique and fun. Aside from a few presentation issues, this turns out to be the best Gameloft's racing game yet".

Bryan Lufkin of Gamezebo wrote: "Minor quirks aside, Fast Five will be a real treat for those who like iOS racers. The fairly extensive list of unlockables and titles to achieve, as well as online multiplayer, guarantee Vin Diesel wannabes will whet their appetite for flashy drag races and high-speed gameplay."

Víctor Moyano of Vandal wrote: "Ultimately, a noteworthy racing game that fans of the genre will enjoy. Even for those who aren't fans of the movies, this is a racing game. fun racing".

Blake Grundman of 148Apps wrote: "Although Fast Five the Movie: Official Game is supposed to be a compliment to the movie, it honestly feels like another attempt to exploit Gameloft's existing customer base."

Tom Orry of VideoGamer wrote: "If you're looking for a tilt-based racing game that mimics the great titles on home consoles, Need for Speed: Hot Pursuit is a better iOS title complete and accomplished."

Tommaso Pugliese from Multiplayer.it wrote: "Fast Five the Movie: Official Game is a good racing game with very good graphics, a rich career mode and online multiplayer for up to ten players. controls not working as they should: tilt controls are pretty inaccurate, touch controls are definitely better, but you always struggle to perform a power swipe."
