= NFL (series) =

Video game series

- App logo of NFL Pro 2012
- Genre: Sports
- Developer: Gameloft
- Publisher: Gameloft
- Platforms: Mobile, Android, iOS, Palm Pre, Nintendo DS
- First release: NFL 2009; 2008
- Latest release: NFL Pro 2013; 2012

NFL is a series of American football games developed by Gameloft, which is supposed to be a simulation of the National Football League. The game series was released on iOS, as well as Palm, and was originally released on the Nintendo DS. The series first came on the DS as NFL 2009 in 2008. Starting with NFL Pro 2012, the game became free, even though players still have to pay for extra XP. 2012 is also the first game to have experience points and team points, which can be used to boost players, as well as credits, which can be earned by leveling up, as well as watching Gameloft trailers. In NFL Pro 2013, when the player is in a passing play, the camera will zoom into a first-person view from the quarterback's perspective.

== Games ==
- NFL 2009 (2008)
- NFL 2010 (HD) (2009)
- NFL 2011 HD (2010)
- NFL Pro 2012 (2011)
- NFL Pro 2013 (2012)
- NFL Pro 2014 (2013)

== Players ==
The series, along with the agreement with the NFL, also has an agreement with the NFL Players Association. Along with this, the game also has "cover players", who appear on the title screen, with 2009 having players on the game cover.

Game	Players
2009	LaDainian Tomlinson, Tony Romo, Reggie Bush, Brian Urlacher, Randy Moss, Terrell Owens
2010	Matt Ryan, Ray Lewis, Kurt Warner, Brian Westbrook, Randy Moss, LaDainian Tomlinson
2011	Reggie Bush, Adrian Peterson. Aaron Rodgers, Jason Witten, DeSean Jackson, Darrelle Revis, Chad Ochocinco, Tom Brady, Ray Lewis, Peyton Manning

== Reception ==
Reviews

Aggregate score
Aggregator	Score
Metacritic	38/100

Review scores
Publication	Score
IGN	5.5/10
Pocket Gamer	2/5
148Apps	"Drab Football"
Gamezebo	2/5
PC World	3/5

The series received mixed reviews from players and critics alike, saying that the NFL license was a good touch, but the artificial intelligence makes the game very difficult. Gamezebo gave NFL Pro 2012 2 stars out of 5, saying that the defensive AI was "atrocious", as well as the freemium model. PC World gave the game 3 stars out of 5, praising the control scheme and graphics, while noting the cost. 148Apps gave the 2011 game a 3.5 out of 5 star "drab football" grade, questioning the need for celebrations after a gain of more than 10 yards. IGN gave the 2011 edition a 5.5 "Mediocre" grade, praising the gameplay on the iPhone 4, while criticizing the poor controls and weak passing. Pocket Gamer stated that NFL Pro 2014 is “more disappointing than an afternoon spent watching the Pro Bowl.”
