= New York Nights 2: Friends For Life =

2008 video game

- New York Nights 2 cover art
- Developer: Gameloft Montreal
- Publisher: Gameloft
- Directors: Stanislas Dewavrin; Matthiev Gosnet
- Producers: Anthony Faby; Jacob Black; Cui Xui Rong
- Designers: Baptiste Marmey; Nick Penninipede; Natalie Nunez; David McLaughlin; Wang Hao Yan; Yu Yu Fen; Lthier Yu; Tong Yin Shan
- Programmers: Travis Estrada; Colin Davis; Olivier Brassard
- Writers: Baptiste Marmey; Tammy Goodman; Jacob Black; David McLaughlin; Colin Davis
- Series: Nights
- Platforms: Button-operated mobile phone Android iOS
- Release: 2008
- Genres: Action-adventure; Life simulation
- Mode: Single-player

New York Nights 2: Friends For Life is an interaction-based action-adventure video game developed by Gameloft New York and published by Gameloft. It was released for button-operated mobile phones and Android and iOS devices in 2008. It is the sequel to New York Nights: Success in the City.

== Plot ==
The plot centers around the protagonist (whose gender is chosen by the player), who has gone to New York City to live with their sibling. In the airport, the protagonist's cab is taken by someone else who punches them, causing them to get dizzy and eventually get hit by a limousine owned by a famous actor. The actor then sends the player to their apartment in Greenwich where the protagonist meets their sibling who tells them that they should look for a roommate due to lack of money for rent. After they find a roommate, they get a job as a dancer at a prestigious nightclub in Times Square. After paying the rent to the landlord's child, the character seeks a job opportunity as a stock trader on Wall Street.

After acquiring the trader job, the protagonist's sibling reunites them with their high school sweetheart. They go on 3 dates and then go steady (if the player already has a lover, this will not happen). The protagonist's sibling tells them to go to Chinatown to celebrate; there they see the actor being robbed by a thug. They help the actor only to realize that they intruded on the filming set of the actor's new film. At the apartment, they are given a surprise birthday party where the protagonist befriends the friends of their lover. After spending the night together, the protagonist's sweetheart prepares breakfast only to hear the actor calling the character to the nightclub over a phone call using seductive words. This infuriates the lover, who then leaves the player character. After meeting with the actor, the player is introduced to a famous NYC agent who gives them an offer in exchange of the player being used as publicity for the actor.

The actor/actress forces the player character to break up with their lover during the premiere of the actor/actress's movie. As the protagonist walks along the red carpet, their sibling and lover arrive at the gate and crash the event and demand that the player come back to them. The player must make a decision whether to take the contract with the actor or go with their sibling, lover, and friends.

One ending, where the player character chooses their friends reveals that the actor burned the contract and that the protagonist is very happy and content with their life. The other ending has the player character choosing the actor and becoming big time in NYC as they become successful in the city together with the actor declaring their true feelings for the player.

== Gameplay ==
The button-operated/keypad-based version, the 360x640 touchscreen version, and the Android version of the game are completely identical.
