= Massive Snowboarding =

2005 video game

- Developer(s): Gameloft
- Publisher(s): Gameloft
- Artist(s): Arthur Hugot; Michael Parent; David Hensley
- Composer(s): Romain Gauthier
- Platform(s): Mobile
- Release: NA: September 10, 2005
- Genre(s): Snowboarding
- Mode(s): Single-player

Massive Snowboarding is a 2005 snowboarding video game developed and published by Gameloft and created for the V CAST service from Verizon Wireless. It was released in North America on September 10, 2005.

== Gameplay ==
Screenshot of a snowboarder executing a trick in the game.

Massive Snowboarding allows the player to choose from up to five different characters in different modes. In the main career mode, there are three different types of gameplay available: Ride Challenge, Rival Race, and Video Shoot.

Most of the game takes place in Ride Challenge, where the player is given objectives to complete before reaching the bottom of the slope, ranging from gaining a certain number of points through tricks to executing a certain trick. Rival race is racing another player down the slope. Video shoot tasks the player with earning a certain point value on only one huge jump.

== Reception ==
Reviews and awards
Publication	Score	Comment
IGN	9.0/10	Wireless Buyer's Guide pick
GameSpot	9.2/10	Editor's Choice
1UP.com	A-	
Modojo	3/5	

Massive Snowboarding was praised by most critics. GameSpot gave Massive Snowboarding an Editors' Choice award, stating, "Gameloft has struck a balance between the speedy and the spectacular, and the result is an excellent and highly addictive sports title." The reviewer from 1UP.com wrote, "It's the most attractive, engaging mobile game I've ever played." IGN gave the game an "outstanding" grade, writing "If I was Verizon, I'd make sure Massive Snowboarding was playing on all of my V CAST phones at retail locations -- it's the kind of game that could move a phone."
