= Gameloft Brisbane =

Australian video game studio

- Industry: Video games
- Founded: 2014
- Headquarters: 549 Queen St, QLD 4000, Brisbane, Queensland, Australia
- Members: 130
- Parent: Gameloft
- Website: https://www.gameloft.com/gameloft-studios/brisbane

Gameloft Brisbane is an Australian video game studio belonging to the French group Gameloft, founded in 2014 in Brisbane and currently employing nearly 130 people. This is Brisbane’s most important video game studio. It is also currently the only Gameloft studio that exclusively develops premium games (without microtransactions).

== History ==
In 2014, the French video game company Gameloft decided to establish a new studio in Brisbane, Australia. Gameloft Brisbane opened with only 15 employees. It took the team two years to release their first game, Zombie Anarchy, a free-to-play mobile survival strategy game. The game received mixed to positive reviews and achieved a relative commercial success.

At this time, Gameloft as a whole began facing financial difficulties. In response, the company decided to refocus Gameloft Brisbane on developing premium games (unlike other Gameloft studios, these would not be free-to-play and would contain no microtransactions). The Brisbane team expanded and released their second game, Ballistic Baseball, on Apple Arcade. Despite receiving very positive reviews, Gameloft Brisbane was forced to lay off 15 of its 58 employees and restructure the studio’s development pipeline.

The studio then began work on two new premium games: a remake of The Oregon Trail and My Little Pony: Mane Merge, both released in 2021 and 2022. Both games achieved notable success, with The Oregon Trail standing out. After its critical acclaim and success on Apple Arcade (It is also the most downloaded Apple Arcade game in 2021), The Oregon Trail was gradually ported to PC and consoles, including physical releases, where it also enjoyed both critical and commercial success, the game also received several awards at various ceremonies, including in the categories of best narrative game, best sound, best music, and best art direction.In 2022, Gameloft Brisbane was named Best Studio of the Year at the Australian Game Developer Awards.

Around the same time, Gameloft Montreal released Disney Dreamlight Valley for PC and consoles, which became the biggest success in Gameloft’s history and helped the entire group emerge from the crisis it had entered in 2015. As part of a new strategy focusing on PC and console games, Gameloft selected Brisbane as one of the key studios to lead this shift, largely due to the success of The Oregon Trail. The producer of Disney Dreamlight Valley, Manea Castet, is leaving Gameloft Montreal to become the studio manager of Gameloft Brisbane. To maintain visibility, Gameloft Brisbane continued to release free updates for The Oregon Trail and began development on Carmen Sandiego. The studio’s team grew significantly, expanding from about 50 to 100 employees.

Carmen Sandiego was released in 2025 to generally positive reviews, though not as acclaimed as The Oregon Trail. While Gameloft did not disclose sales figures for Carmen Sandiego, the studio continued to expand, surpassing 130 employees in 2026. In the same year, Gameloft Brisbane announced its next game, Bluey's Happy Snaps, based on the Bluey license,the most significant IP to originate from Australia, the studio’s home country. The game launched in October 2026 and received positive reviews. Like previous Gameloft Brisbane games, Bluey's Happy Snaps is without microtransactions or mandatory online connectivity. Physical editions are released for all console platforms.

Gameloft Brisbane is today one of the main driving forces of Gameloft in terms of PC and console releases.

== Gameloft Brisbane Games ==
Except for its first game, Zombie Anarchy (a free-to-play title now unavailable due to server dependency), Gameloft Brisbane games releases are premium, avoiding microtransactions and often mandatory online connectivity. The Oregon Trail (2021), Carmen Sandiego (2025) and Bluey's Happy Snaps (2026) have a physical version.

Title	Year	platform(s)
Zombie Anarchy	2016	Android, IOS, Windows
Ballistic Baseball	2019	Apple Arcade
The Oregon Trail	2021	Apple Arcade, Nintendo Switch, Nintendo Switch 2, PlayStation 4, PlayStation 5, Steam, Windows, Xbox One, Xbox Series
My Little Pony: Mane Merge	2022	Apple Arcade
Carmen Sandiego	2025	Android, IOS, Netflix Games, Nintendo Switch, Nintendo Switch 2, PlayStation 4, PlayStation 5, Steam, Windows, Xbox One, Xbox Series
Bluey's Happy Snaps	2026	Epic Games Store, Nintendo Switch, Nintendo Switch 2, PlayStation 4, PlayStation 5, Steam, Windows, Xbox One, Xbox Series
