= Gangstar: Miami Vindication =

2010 video game

- Gangstar: Miami Vindication logo
- Developer: Gameloft Montreal
- Publisher: Gameloft
- Series: Gangstar
- Platforms: iOS, Android, Mobile phone, Mac OS X
- Release: iPhone, Android; September 23, 2010 iPad; October 26, 2010; Mobile; December 2010; Mac OS X September 14, 2011
- Genres: Action-adventure, shooter
- Mode: Single-player

Gangstar: Miami Vindication is an open-world action-adventure video game published by Gameloft and developed by Gameloft Montreal. It consists of a two-dimensional (2D) version and a 3D version, and was released for iOS, Android, mobile phones, and Mac OS X. It follows Gangstar 2: Kings of L.A. and Gangstar: West Coast Hustle and is the third main game in the Gangstar series. The story follows Johnny Gainsville (spelled "Gainesville" in the 3D version), a middle-aged man in search for his younger brother Joey, who was last seen in Miami, who is driven into a life of crime.

The game was a top seller on the App Store in many countries, including the United States, Mexico, Japan and several European countries.

== Gameplay ==
Gangstar: Miami Vindication features helicopters, motorboats/boats/jet skis, and motorcycles. Police vehicles can be customized as well. The 3D version is the first game in the series to feature voice acting instead of only textual dialogues (albeit lacking any facial animations). The 3D version features more profanity than West Coast Hustle. Other than people, alligators can be killed, but do not give any benefit. According to the preview of the 3D version by Gameloft, the map is 1.5 times larger than West Coast Hustle. Although it is the successor to Kings of L.A. and West Coast Hustle, the only connections between the games are L.C.'s appearance, news flashes from Kings of L.A., and a reference to Eddie Fallon (in the 3D version's case). In 2012, a spin-off titled Urban Crime was released; it follows the aftermath of the departure of Johnny Gainesville from Miami. As of early 2018, the game has suddenly disappeared from the Apple App Store for unknown reasons.

== Reception ==
Reception

Aggregate score
Aggregator	Score
Metacritic	82/100

Review scores
Publication	Score
4Players	47%
Eurogamer	5/10
Gamekult	5/10
IGN	7.5/10
Pocket Gamer	(Mobile) 4/5 (iPhone) 3/5
Common Sense Media	2/5

The iPhone version received "favorable" reviews according to the review aggregation website Metacritic.
