= Order & Chaos 2: Redemption =

2015 video game

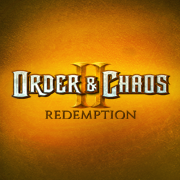
- Developer(s): Gameloft Beijing
- Publisher(s): Gameloft
- Series: Order & Chaos
- Platform(s): Android, iOS, Windows, Windows Phone
- Release: 17 September 2015
- Genre(s): Massively multiplayer online role-playing

Order & Chaos 2: Redemption was a fantasy massively multiplayer online role-playing game developed by Gameloft for Microsoft Windows, Windows Phone, iOS, and Android devices. The game was released on 17 September 2015 as a sequel to the 2011 title Order & Chaos Online.

== Gameplay ==
Order & Chaos 2: Redemption allows the player to create a character from a combination of races and classes. The five races included in the game are the humans, mendels, orcs, kratans and elves. The classes are divided into five categories: Warrior, Ranger, Blood Knight, Monk and Mage. Each character's appearance can be modified through the customization feature, limited to hair, colors and certain facial details.

A sizeable part of the game involves the completion of quests. Some of them will advance the overall plot of the story and others will garner experience points and loot. The players can be informed of Instant Quests that are triggered on the fly at certain points. Simply walking around a region with an active Instant Quest will trigger it, allowing the players to get right into completing its objectives for the associated rewards.

During combat, characters have one standard attack, while the other three attacks are made of skills that can be swapped out for different moves as the characters learn more during the game's progression. The players have pouches, which are used for holding extra skills and consumables.

The game is played from either a first-person or third-person view perspective. The player can edit view distance and perspective using the Pinch and Zoom feature. Movement is controlled using a virtual joystick that is located in the lower left corner of the screen. Combat and interface controls are mapped to virtual buttons which can be activated by touching them.

== Story ==
The game has two possible start locations, Mariner's Landing and Cliffside, which change the story's beginning.

- In Cliffside, a mercenary is working under his commander, who orders him to stop the rioters, who are protesting against the commander for not entering a mine where a collapse happened. The commander was hired by PhosCo Industries. Secretly, at the request of a young lady, the mercenary investigates the mine, where he discovers a strange blue version of Phosphos, a valuable mineral produced by PhosCo Industries. While exploring the cave, the mercenary discovers workers mutated into zombies, including the lady's husband. Before mutating, the lady's husband says that the blue Phosphos is the cause. After killing him, the mercenary returns to the town, only to find it being attacked and overrun by zombies. The mercenary meets the lady and escorts her to safety before killing the mutated commander. The lady thanks him, tells him to tell Maxwell, a PhosCo scientist, and gives him an antique weapon.
- In Mariner's Landing, the player is a soldier. After collecting blue Phosphos for his superiors, the player is tasked to investigate the disappearance of a young girl. After completing several tasks, another soldier reveals that he saw the girl traveling out of town with a boy. The player investigates, only to find the boy's throat clawed. Following footprints leading out of the house, the soldier finds the mutated girl feasting on a wolf. After killing her, the player returns to town, only to find it being overrun by zombies. He then kills his commander, who had been mutated. Later, the player finds the grave of the man who informed him about the girl's location. The soldier admits to selling blue Phosphos, which was the cause of the mutations. On his grave, he leaves an antique weapon, which the player takes.

The player travels to Harvester Mine, a mine run by PhosCo Industries. He discovers that Maxwell had been imprisoned. The player is helped in his task to free Maxwell by Wesley, another PhosCo employee. The player is tasked to create a replacement part for the Harvester, which had broken down. After doing so, the Harvester breaks down, with Wesley revealing that that was his true plan all along. After defeating his henchmen, the player kills Drake, a tyrannical PhosCo commander. The player then meets with Maxwell, who had picked his cell lock while the guards were distracted by the Harvester breaking down. After talking to him, the player talks to Wesley, who reveals that he was secretly working for the Scythe, a vigilante working for the people. The player then travels to Long Beach, where he follows the captain of the guard, who was actually a murderer. The player then contacts one of Scythe's spies, who he tells his discoveries. Wesley later contacts the player, telling him that there are mutated workers imprisoned by PhosCo Industries nearby. He also tells the player that Maxwell has been recaptured, and is most likely in a nearby camp for PhosCo Industries. The player then creates a distraction before heading to free Maxwell. However, he discovers that Maxwell, as well as several mercenaries, have been mutated, forcing the player to kill Maxwell.

The player then contacts Orly, a Son of Truth also working for Scythe, who tells him that he has a plan to storm PhosCo Industries' nearby headquarters. First, the player creates a bomb. The player then frees PhosCo prisoners, kills PhosCo guards, and kills mutated workers before leaving the base, only to find a dying Orly. Orly reveals that Wesley had betrayed him. He tells the player that Wesley is the Scythe, and that he is planning to destroy the dam protecting Long Beach to attract attention to PhosCo's activities. The player defeats Wesley and shuts down the bomb before meeting Hunter, a House of Stone representative, who reveals that an infected PhosCo commander is trying to escape via ship. The player kills the commander and returns to Hunter, who asks him to inform the city of Stone Throw that an offshoot of the Sons of Truth, known as the "Truthbearers", are planning to destroy the city if they do not free Wesley. The player kills several Truthbearers and their commanders before discovering that the Truthbearer second-in-command was secretly negotiating with Princess Clara. The princess informs the player of her plan to get the Truthbearers to surrender by persuading Wesley to surrender, which the player does. However, a rogue faction of Truthbearers, led by the sorceress Casca, attempt to escape the law. However, the player hunts them down, destroys their ship, and kills Casca.
