= Maxime Goulet (composer) =

Canadian composer (born 1980)

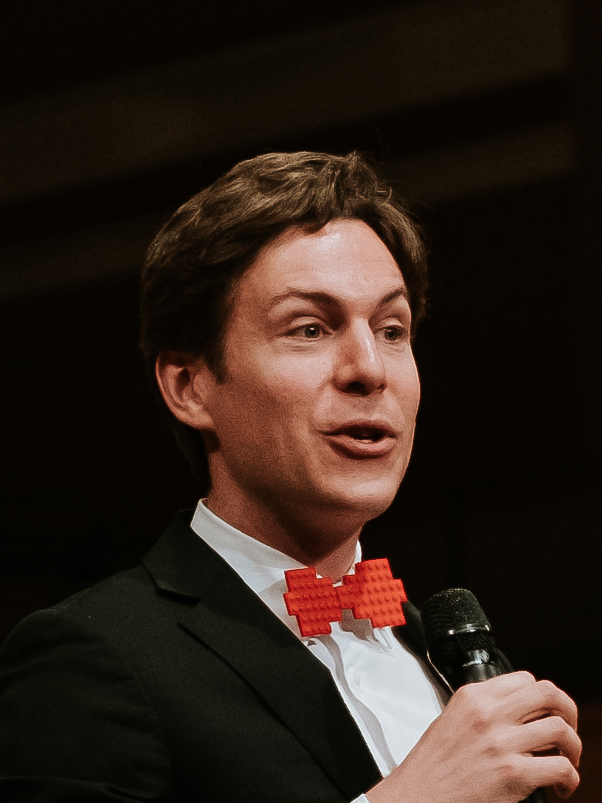
- Goulet in 2017

Background information
- Born: June 7, 1980 (age 46); Montreal, Quebec, Canada
- Occupation: Composer
- Years active: 2007–present

Maxime Goulet (born June 7, 1980) is a Canadian composer, who writes concert music for orchestra and scores for video games.

== Early life and education ==
Maxime Goulet was born and raised in Montreal, Canada to a French speaking family. He studied music composing at Université de Montréal with Alan Belkin. He earned his B. Mus. in 2005 and his Master's degree in 2007. Later, he attended several trainings and master classes, namely at the Festival international du film d'Aubagne in 2007, and the ASCAP Film Scoring Workshop, with Richard Bellis in Los Angeles in 2009.

== Career ==
=== Concert music ===
The concert music of Maxime Goulet has been performed by a wide range of ensembles and musicians in countries around the world, including the Montreal Symphony Orchestra, the Toronto Symphony Orchestra, the Vancouver Opera, the Orchestre Philharmonique de Liège, the Houston Symphony, Detroit Symphony Orchestra, Aarhus Symphony Orchestra, Vancouver Symphony Orchestra, and many others.

Maxime Goulet's works often explore themes of daily life and playfulness: Symphonic Chocolates evokes various chocolate flavours, Checkmate! is structured as a chess match between a piano and an orchestra, Symphonic Aerobic Dance is a workout for orchestra, On Halloween Night evokes creatures associated with Halloween, A Bassoon Circus is composed as circus acts and Fishing Story evokes a fishing trip.

His other works are often inspired by historical events: Ice Storm Symphony commemorates the 25th anniversary of the 1998 historical ice storm in Canada, United Anthems celebrates the 150th anniversary of Canada , Symphonic Factory celebrates the 375th anniversary of the City of Montreal, and Citius, Altius, Fortius! celebrates the 2010 Vancouver Winter Olympics.

The album Maxime Goulet: Symphonie de la tempête du verglas, recorded by the Orchestre classique de Montréal won a Juno Award in the category "Classical Album of the Year (Large Ensemble)".

In 2026, Maxime Goulet was awarded the Opus Prize for Composer of the Year. That same year, the Montreal Symphony Orchestra's concert presenting his work Le Carnaval des insectes received the Opus Prize for Production of the Year, Young Audiences.

=== Video game music ===
Between 2007 and 2013, Maxime Goulet has been staff composer for Gameloft. During his tenure, he wrote music for video games such as Brothers in Arms 3: Sons of War, The Amazing Spiderman, Dungeon Hunter: Alliance, Dungeon Hunter 4, Order & Chaos Online, Wild Blood, Shrek Forever After and Iron Man 2.

Since 2013, Maxime Goulet has been working as a freelance video game composer. He has composed music for games such as Warhammer 40,000: Eternal Crusade, Roller Coaster Tycoon World and Ancestors: The Humankind Odyssey.

In 2017, along with Orchestre Métropolitain and conductor Dina Gilbert, he created The Montreal Video Game Symphony, a multimedia concert that features music of games developed in the city of Montreal

== List of works ==
List of concert music composition by Maxime Goulet.

=== Orchestral works ===
- 2007: A Puppet Parade
- 2008: Citius, altius, fortius!
- 2012: Symphonic Aerobic Dance
- 2012: Symphonic Chocolates
- 2014: On Halloween Night
- 2017: United Anthems
- 2017: Symphonic Factory
- 2017: Beach Ball Games for Orchestra
- 2023: Ice Storm Symphony
- 2024: The Carnival of the Insects

=== Concertante ===
- 2014: Fishing Story for Clarinet and String Orchestra
- 2016: Beatles Fantasy for Violin and Orchestra
- 2017: A Bassoon Circus for Bassoon and Orchestra
- 2018: Checkmate! for Piano and Orchestra

=== Operas ===
- 2012: Bungalopolis (collective work)
- 2020: The Flight of the Hummingbird

=== Chamber music ===
- 2004: Watercolour for Piano
- 2005: The Wool-Spinning Devil for Narrator, Clarinet, Cello and Piano
- 2006: On a Tightrope for String Quartet
- 2011: What a Day for String Orchestra
- 2014: Concertized Introductions for String Orchestra
- 2015: Level Up! for Keyboard and String Orchestra
- 2020: Micro météo for Tenor and Piano

== Discography ==
- Chocolats Symphoniques, Prague Filmharmonic, 2014.
- Au grand orgue Pierre-Béique, Jean-Willy Kunz, ATMA Music, 2017.
- Les plaisirs coupables, Orchestre symphonique de Sherbrooke, 2017.
- Canada Mosaic - Sesquies, Toronto Symphony Orchestra, 2018.
- Maxime Goulet: Symphonie de la tempête de verglas, Orchestre Classique de Montréal, ATMA Music, 2023.

== List of game music ==
List of video games for which Maxime Goulet has composed music (as main composer or as additional music composer).

Video games
Year	Title	Developer	Notes
2007	Schlag den Raab	Gameloft	
2008	Prince of Persia Zero	Gameloft	
2008	Abracadaball	Gameloft	
2008	Uno	Gameloft	
2009	Tank Battles	Gameloft	
2009	Ghost Mansion Party	Gameloft	
2009	Castle Frenzy	Gameloft	
2009	Siberian Strike	Gameloft	
2010	Dungeon Hunter 2	Gameloft	
2010	Shrek Forever After	Gameloft	
2010	Iron Man 2	Gameloft	
2010	Brothers in Arms 2: Global Front	Gameloft	
2010	Legend of Exidia	Gameloft	
2010	Eternal Legacy	Gameloft	
2011	Dungeon Hunter 3	Gameloft	
2011	Dungeon Hunter: Alliance	Gameloft	
2011	Order & Chaos Online	Gameloft	
2011	BackStab	Gameloft	
2011	The Adventures of Tintin	Gameloft	
2012	The Amazing Spider-Man	Gameloft	
2012	Ice Age Village	Gameloft	
2013	Dungeon Hunter 4	Gameloft	
2013	Wonder Zoo	Gameloft	
2014	Wild Blood	Gameloft	
2014	Brothers in Arms 3: Sons of War	Gameloft	
2014	The Amazing Spider-Man 2	Gameloft	
2014	Magical World of Words	Amarok Games	
2015	Splash Pop	Frima	
2016	Warhammer 40,000: Eternal Crusade	Behaviour Interactive	
2016	Roller Coaster Tycoon World	Nvizzio & Atari	
2017	Rise of Madness	Amarok Games	
2017	Mini Guns	Riposte Games	
2019	Ancestors: The Humankind Odyssey	Panache Digital Games	Additional music by Maxime Goulet (on an original theme by Mamo Koba)
2023	One More Gate: A Wakfu Legend	Ankama	
