= Dungeon Hunter: Alliance =

2011 video game

- North American PS Vita box art
- Developer: Gameloft Montreal
- Publishers: Gameloft; Ubisoft (PS Vita)
- Producers: Jean-Claude Labelle; Jocelyn Lefrançois; Robin Gazaille
- Designer: Dominique Mercure
- Programmer: Jérome Poulin
- Artists: Christophe Latour; Arthur Hugot
- Composer: Maxime Goulet
- Series: Dungeon Hunter
- Platforms: PlayStation 3, PlayStation Vita, macOS
- Release: PlayStation 3: EU: April 6, 2011; NA: April 12, 2011; JP: September 13, 2011; macOS; November 11, 2011; PlayStation Vita: JP: December 17, 2011; NA: February 15, 2012; EU: February 22, 2012; AU: February 23, 2012
- Genre: Action role-playing
- Modes: Single-player, multiplayer

Dungeon Hunter: Alliance is a 2011 hack and slash action role-playing video game developed by Gameloft Montreal and published for the PlayStation 3 and PlayStation Vita. It is a remake of the 2009 iPhone game Dungeon Hunter, with the addition of a multiplayer mode and support for the PlayStation Move controller.

== Gameplay ==
The game is set in a fantasy universe. Three character classes – mage, rogue, and warrior – are playable, with the game taking place over 30 levels in environments including dungeons, forests, and villages, which include randomly generated areas. Single quests are estimated to last 8 hours. Players can restart their game after completing all quests on an Elite mode, which enables them to level up to level 75.

Multiplayer mode supports up to four players on a single server. Each player works together to complete the current quest of the host player, although players who are not on that quest in singleplayer mode will not have their data saved except for items and experience. Each player is assigned a color and their character can only pick up items with that color around them, ensuring each player gets an equal amount of loot. Unlike in singleplayer, when a character dies, the other players have a chance to revive him or her instead of having to completely restart the level. When all players die, the level will be restarted however.

== Reception ==
Reception

Aggregate score
Aggregator	Score	
Aggregator	PS Vita	PS3
Metacritic	49/100	67/100

Review scores
Publication	Score	
Publication	PS Vita	PS3
Destructoid	2/10	N/A
Electronic Gaming Monthly	5/10	N/A
Eurogamer	N/A	7/10
Famitsu	32/40	N/A
Game Informer	5/10	N/A
GameSpot	6/10	7/10
GameTrailers	5.6/10	N/A
IGN	5.5/10	6/10
PlayStation Official Magazine – UK	4/10	7/10
PlayStation: The Official Magazine	5/10	N/A
The A.V. Club	N/A	B−
Metro	3/10	N/A

The PlayStation 3 version of Dungeon Hunter: Alliance received "average" reviews, while the Vita version received "generally unfavorable reviews", according to the review aggregation website Metacritic. The PlayStation Move implementation was criticised as not working well, the gameplay was considered well implemented, but generic and dated. As released the PS3 version had technical issues with the multiplayer online game hosting, but was eventually fixed.

In Japan, where the game was ported under the name Dark Quest: Alliance (ダーククエスト〜Alliance(アライアンス)〜, Dāku Kuesuto 〜Araiansu〜) and released for the PS3 version on September 13, 2011, and for the Vita version on December 17, 2011 as a launch title, Famitsu gave the latter a score of all four eights for a total of 32 out of 40.
