= Gangstar Rio: City of Saints =

2012 video game

- Gangstar Rio: City of Saints title screen
- Developer: Gameloft Montreal
- Publisher: Gameloft
- Series: Gangstar
- Platforms: iOS, Android, Mobile phone,
- Release: iPhone, Android; November 10, 2011; Mobile; 2011
- Genres: Action-adventure, shooter
- Mode: Single-player

Gangstar Rio: City of Saints is an open-world action-adventure video game published by Gameloft and developed by Gameloft Montreal. It was released on November 10, 2011. The game consists of a 2D keypad-operated version made for Java (J2ME) platforms and a 3D touch-operated version made for Android and iOS.

The game is part of the Gangstar series. The story revolves around Assassinos gang member Raul. 3D and 2D versions have completely different plots, but a set of shared characters. The 3D version is set in modern-day Rio de Janeiro, Brazil. The game was followed by a sequel, Gangstar Vegas, in 2013.

== Gameplay ==
=== 2D ===
In the 2D version, Raul leaves a party he was enjoying with his girlfriend Ana in order to do an urgent job for his boss. Ana scolds Raul for doing criminal jobs and urges him to find legal ones. Under orders of his boss, Raul enters a company car, but it explodes, making him fall into a coma; a month later he wakes in front of a hospital with a different face, and decides to go undercover in his gang to find out who planted the bomb. He got known and attracted to Laryssa, who now occupies his position in the gang. She introduces him into the gang under a false name of Angel. After doing some basic jobs for the boss, Raul asks his gang underboss to find out what happened to Raul. Because of that, the gang boss starts suspecting the underboss in an attempt to explode him and orders Angel/Raul to kill him. Raul executes the underboss despite knowing he is innocent. Then, Raul is tasked to acquire a package of documents related to the "Wet Package", a stock of blood diamonds supposedly being shipped. He finds the information implicating the boss in exploding the car instead. Raul decides to explode his boss as revenge, finds other gang doing that, kills the other gang, does it himself, and is immediately caught by police.

Laryssa turns out to be a police undercover agent. The police blackmail Raul into cooperation. After doing some jobs for police on acquiring info about "Wet Package" - a powerful malware from the rival gang they reveal that it was the police (and not the boss) who destroyed the car and did plastic surgery on Raul in order to manipulate him. Raul coerces a person into cooperation and giving him information on Ana. After doing some investigative missions, Raul kills the suspect he deems responsible, and gets parts of a "Wet Package", a fake dirty kompromat on President of Brazil, though its fakeness is obvious to everyone within the elite. The killed suspect turns to be innocent and the nephew of the president of Brazil.

The President makes police have them wanted and sends hitmen to avenge the nephew and acquire the kompromat. Raul learns that Ana is alive and taken by the revolutionary group. Raul and his new collaborator kill the hitmen and escape the police. The colleague contacts a journalist who has some clue how to contact the group, a famous journalist. The journalist demands Raul to place surveillance cameras on certain buildings in the city in exchange for her help. The journalist manages to help Raul attract attention to the group by drawing its signs all over the city. As result the group got into trouble and Raul has to save its cruel, sadistic and authoritarian leader, Diablo. Raul learns that Diablo is Ana. To prove Ana that he is Raul, Raul has to massacre the city with a bazooka, get $10000 for the group, and get rid of the gangsters wanting $5000. It turn the group is also looking for a "Wet Package" - a powerful mass-scale mind-control technology developed by the state of Brazil.

Raul hits the core scientist in the project, accidentally meets Laryssa on a beach, and exchanges a few words with her. Raul gets the parts of the "Wet Package" and the group assembles the device in its secret base. The device is actually a tracker, informing the military of the group's location. Most of the group is exterminated. The journalist manipulated the factions into war by sending them misinformation about the nature of "Wet Package", which was a complete hoax, in order to boost her career. Raul and Ana hit the police officer who has manipulated Raul and the leaders of two gangs. When they come to avenge the journalist, she was already killed by other gangs who want to kill the witnesses, including Ana and Raul. After that, Ana is jealous of Raul exchanging few words with Laryssa, suspects him to be committing infidelity, and orders to kill both him and Laryssa. Raul kills Ana without any attempt to settle her down and leaves the city with Laryssa.

=== 3D ===
In the 3D version, after attempting to leave the gang with his girlfriend Ana, a car bomb seriously injures Raul and kills Ana. The 3D version features "open world" gameplay that gives the player more control over their playing experience.
