= Gameloft Montreal =

Canadian video game developer

- Industry: Video games
- Founded: 2000
- Headquarters: 7250 Marconi Street, Montreal, Quebec, Canada
- Members: 400
- Parent: Gameloft
- Website: www.gameloft.com/gameloft-studios/montreal

Gameloft Montreal is a Canadian video game studio that belongs to the French group Gameloft. It was founded in 2000 in Montreal and currently employs around 400 people. The studio initially specialized in mobile games for its first twenty years, but in 2022, following the significant success of Disney Dreamlight Valley, it diversified its business into console and personal computer games.

In addition to Disney Dreamlight Valley, the studio is known for having developed and launched the first installments of the Asphalt, Dungeon Hunter, and Modern Combat franchises; and until its shift to computer and console game production, Gameloft Montreal was the largest mobile gaming studio in Quebec.

== History ==
On 12 June 2000, Gameloft announced the creation of its global interactive content development center in Montreal—particularly for online games. The initiative, supported by the Quebec government, was given tax credits covering up to half of new employees' salaries.

=== 2003-2015: Constant growth ===
The first game developed by Gameloft Montreal was Gulo's Tale, released in 2003 on J2ME. The player controls "Gulo", a small anthropomorphic creature with a cartoon-style design, capable of running, jumping, and creating bubbles that function both as weapons and platforms. Gulo progresses through levels in which fruits must be collected, advancing across a world map. The game has received generally positive feedback, with praise for its original bubble-based mechanics and stylized visual presentation; although some critics have noted its limited length and repetitive level structure.

In 2004, Gameloft Montreal released the first game in the Asphalt franchise, called Asphalt: Urban GT. The game, which has been a huge success with over 5 million sales, is in three dimensions, offers nine circuits inspired by real places (including Paris, New York and Las Vegas) and has 23 vehicles from major brands such as Aston Martin, Lamborghini and Audi.

In addition to several minor titles such as New York Nights: Success in the City, Naval Battle: Mission Commander, Bubble Bash, and Midnight Pool released between 2005 and 2007, Gameloft Montreal released Asphalt: Urban GT 2 in 2005. Compared to the first installment, this sequel offers more cars and motorcycles, new tracks, denser traffic with realistic gaps for overtaking, notable graphical improvements, and a significantly expanded “takedown” collision system, where ramming an opponent can eliminate them from the race—all features that would quickly become some of the series’ signature innovations. The development of the "takedown" mechanic was accompanied by new game modes, diversifying the gameplay, such as "Bandit Chase," "Duel," and "Elimination".

In 2007, Gameloft Montreal also developed Prince of Persia Classic, a complete remake of the first Prince of Persia game (a license belonging to another French group,Ubisoft). Prince of Percia Classic received very good reviews, with an average score of 82 out of 100 on Metacritic.

In 2008, the studio grew from 230 employees to over 300.

In 2009, Gameloft Montreal developed the first installments of two of Gameloft's major franchises: Dungeon Hunter and Modern Combat: Sandstorm.

In 2010, Gameloft Montreal released four major games: Asphalt 6: Adrenaline, Dungeon Hunter II, Gangstar: Miami Vindication, and Modern Combat 2: Black Pegasus, which is the highest-rated game in the Modern Combat franchise on Metacritic, with an average score of 90 out of 100.

A new and innovative feature in Asphalt 6 : Adrenaline is the "Adrenaline mode", which is achieved by hitting nitro while the meter is full. While in Adrenaline mode, the player's car becomes virtually indestructible, simultaneously gaining the ability to easily wreck opponents' cars upon the slightest contact. This feature has become an important element of the Asphalt franchise's gameplay, and has since been a staple feature in all games of the series.

In 2011, Gameloft Montreal released two major games: Gangstar Rio: City of Saints, which received generally positive feedback, and Modern Combat 3: Fallen Nation, which garnered excellent reviews including a Metacritic average of 88 out of 100, and achieved significant commercial success. The same year, the studio also made Dungeon Hunter Alliance on PlayStation 3. The game received mixed reviews, with praise for its dynamic gameplay and cooperative mode for up to four players, but criticism for its dated graphics, long loading times, and its "hefty price tag".

On 27 June 2012, Gameloft Montreal released its last Asphalt game, Asphalt 7: Heat. It was a huge commercial success, selling several million copies. At launch, the game featured 15 tracks, 6 game modes, and over 60 cars. Subsequent development of the Asphalt franchise was entrusted to Gameloft Barcelona. Asphalt 7: Heat received generally very positive reviews, with an average score of 83 out of 100 on Metacritic. The studio also released Modern Combat 4: Zero Hour the same year, which also received generally very positive reviews, with an average score of 82 out of 100 on Metacritic.

In 2013, the studio released the open world Gangstar Vegas, which was a huge success. It is still receiving updates in 2026, and surpassed 200 million downloads in 2023.

In 2014, Gameloft Montreal employed 415 people following a significant recruitment campaign. The following year, the studio released Dungeon Hunter V.

=== 2016-2021: Difficulties ===
From 2016 to 2021, Gameloft Montreal experienced several commercial setbacks. For example, multiple online games (Modern Combat Versus (2017), Dungeon Hunter Champions (2018), Overdrive City (2019) ans Endless Survival(2020)) had their servers shut down after poor commercial performance. Unlike other Gameloft studios that underwent major restructuring and closures during this period, Gameloft Montreal was not subject to mass layoffs.

In 2017, the studio also released a new installment in the Gangstar series, titled Gangstar: New Orleans. Although it did not experience the same level of commercial hardship as the four aforementioned titles, the game achieved lower commercial results than to its predecessor, Gangstar: Vegas. As of 2026, the game’s servers remain operational; however, it no longer receives content updates, unlike Gangstar: Vegas, which continues to be regularly updated.

In 2021, the studio released Lego Star Wars: Castaways exclusively on Apple Arcade. The game has generally received very good reviews.

=== Since 2022: Major relaunch following the transition to PC and console games ===
In September 2022, Gameloft Montreal launched Disney Dreamlight Valley as an early access title on computers and consoles. The game far exceeded commercial expectations; Gameloft's overall revenue jumped 48% in the July–September 2022 period compared to the previous year. As of July 2026, just over 90% of Steam reviews are positive. The game, sold as a paid product, offers microtransactions for cosmetic items.

Following the success of Disney Dreamlight Valley, Gameloft Montreal focused on developing computer and console games.

In 2023, Gameloft announced a physical edition of Disney Dreamlight Valley. Physical editions of Gameloft Montreal games had not been distributed since Dungeon Hunter: Alliance, which released on the PlayStation Vita in 2011.

In 2024, Gameloft Montreal announced it would be developing a game set in the Dungeons & Dragons universe, without providing a specific release date. The game will be released on computers and consoles.

In 2025, Gameloft announced that Disney Dreamlight Valley had become the most successful title ever produced by Gameloft Montreal and entire company itself, generating over $300 million. In November of that year, Gameloft Montreal released the game's third expansion, Wishblossom Ranch, featuring new items, an expanded world map, a new storyline, and the addition of horses in the game.

In 2026, the studio continues hiring for its Dungeons & Dragons game, targeting Early Access in the second half of 2027, while developing a new open-world survival IP (for PC and consoles) and continuing updates for Disney Dreamlight Valley.

== Gameloft Montreal games ==
Gameloft Montreal has produced more than 50 video games. Several games released between 2013 and 2020 are no longer playable because the servers have closed (see the dedicated paragraph in the History section). The oldest Gameloft Montreal game that requires a connection to servers and is still open is Gangstar Vegas (2013). The studio's most successful title is Disney Dreamlight Valley (early access in 2022, full release in 2023). The biggest franchise created by Gameloft Montreal is Asphalt, which is now managed by Gameloft Barcelona.

Title	Year	platform(s)
Gulo's Tale	2003	J2ME
Asphalt: Urban GT	2004	J2ME, BREW, BlackBerry, Nintendo DS, Browser, N-Gage
Tom Clancy's Ghost Recon: Jungle Storm (only for mobile version)	2004	N-Gage, BREW
1000 Words	2004	J2ME, BREW
New York Nights: Success in the City	2005	J2ME (and iPhone in 2009)
Asphalt: Urban GT 2	2005	J2ME, Symbian, Nintendo DS, Windows Mobile, PlayStation Portable, N-Gage
Midnight Pool	2005	J2ME (and iPhone in 2008)
King Kong: The 8th Wonder of the World - Pinball Game	2006	J2ME
Naval Battle: Mission Commander	2006	J2ME (and 2008 on iPod Classic)
Bubble Bash!	2006	J2ME (and 2009 in Android, iPhone, Windows and BlackBerry)
Driver: L.A. Undercover	2007	J2ME, BREW
Prince of Persia Classic	2007	PlayStation 3, Xbox 360, Android, iPhone
Paris Nights (in co-development with Gameloft Beijing)	2007	J2ME, BlackBerry, Windows Mobile
CSI: Miami	2008	iOS
Gangstar: West Coast Hustle	2009	Android, iOS (and 2D version on J2ME)
Modern Combat: Sandstorm	2009	Android, iPhone, Bada, WebOS (and 2D version on J2ME)
Battle Tanks	2009	PlayStation 3, Xbox 360, Android, iPhone
GT Racing: Motor Academy	2009	Android, iPhone, Symbian
Dungeon Hunter	2009	Android, iPhone
Asphalt 6: Adrenaline	2010	Android, iOS, Nintendo 3DS, Symbian, BlackBerry, Mac, WebOS
Gangstar: Miami Vindication	2010	Android, iOS (and 2D version on J2ME)
Modern Combat 2: Black Pegasus	2010	Android, iOS, Windows (and 2D version on J2ME)
Dungeon Hunter II	2010	Android, iOS, Symbian
Gangstar Rio: City of Saints	2011	Android, iOS
Modern Combat 3: Fallen Nation	2011	Android, iOS, Bada 2.0, BlackBerry PlayBook
Dungeon Hunter III	2011	Android, iOS, BlackBerry
Dungeon Hunter: Alliance	2011	PlayStation 3, PlayStation Vita
Asphalt 7: Heat	2012	Android, iOS, BlackBerry 10, BlackBerry PlayBook, Windows Phone, Windows
Modern Combat 4: Zero Hour	2012	Android, iOS, Windows Phone 8, BlackBerry 10, BlackBerry PlayBook
Gangstar Vegas	2013	Android, iOS
Dungeon Hunter 4	2013	Android, iOS, BlackBerry 10, Windows, Windows Phone
Rival Knights	2014	Android, iOS, Windows, Windows Phone
Puzzle Pets	2015	Android, iOS, Windows, Windows Phone
Dungeon Hunter 5	2015	Android, iOS, Windows Phone, Windows
Gangstar: New Orleans	2017	Android, iOS, Windows, Windows Phone
Modern Combat: Versus	2017	Android, iOS, Windows
Dungeon Hunter: Champions	2018	Android, iOS, Windows Phone, Windows
Overdrive City	2019	Android, iOS, Windows
Endless Survival	2020	Android, iOS
Lego Star Wars: Castaways	2021	iOS, macOS, tvOS (all via Apple Arcade)
Disney Dreamlight Valley	2023	PlayStation 4, Playstation 5, Windows, Xbox One, Xbox Series, Nintendo Switch (and Nintendo Switch 2 version in 2026)
Untitled Dungeons & Dragons game	TBA	Windows and unspecified consoles
