= Gangstar Vegas =

2013 video game

- Gangstar Vegas title screen
- Developer: Gameloft Montreal
- Publisher: Gameloft
- Series: Gangstar
- Platforms: Android, iOS
- Release: June 19, 2013
- Genre: Action-adventure
- Mode: Single-player

Gangstar Vegas is an open world action-adventure game developed by Gameloft Montreal and published by Gameloft. It was released for Android and iOS (iPhone, iPod Touch and iPad) on June 19, 2013. It is the sixth (seventh counting Gangstar City) installment in the Gangstar series; it is preceded by Gangstar Rio: City of Saints and succeeded by Gangstar: New Orleans.

Gangstar Vegas is set in modern-day Las Vegas, Nevada. The story revolves around Jason Malone, a skilled mixed martial arts fighter who is targeted by mobster Frank Veliano after accidentally winning in a fixed match. Much like the Grand Theft Auto series, Gangstar Vegas has elements of driving games and third-person shooters, and features "open-world" gameplay that gives the player more control over their playing experience.

Upon its release, it received mixed reviews from critics, who criticized the laggy graphics, animation, and the frequent software updates, but praised the music and the extensive use of three-dimensional (3D) graphics, which some players noted as an improvement over the previous main installment's 3D version. Conversely, player feedback has been extremely positive, with an average rating above 4.4/5 on the Google Play Store and the App Store. It has also been a commercial success, having been downloaded over 200 million times on Android and iOS.

== Gameplay ==
Gangstar Vegas is a third-person open-world action-adventure video game; the graphical perspective is capable of being panned. The game world may be traversed on foot or by vehicle. It is structured similarly to previous games in the series and by extension, to Grand Theft Auto and its numerous "clones". Pedestrians can be killed, primarily in order for the player to get collectibles, and vehicles can be destroyed. The overall game world is much larger, with Gameloft marketing it as "Gangstar's largest open world". In addition to the main story missions, players can freely roam and/or partake in several side-activities like gang wars, bank robberies, street racing and underground fighting tournaments. Property management is also present, allowing the player to gain income through businesses acquired during the course of the game. In keeping with the game's Las Vegas theme, casino minigames such as video poker, blackjack and slot machines were also introduced, along with several establishments such as a nightclub and convenience stores. There are over 80 missions consisting of action, shooting, racing, and thefts. The player can join "parties" in the gang wars with flamethrowers, Molotov cocktails, grenade launchers, and many more lethal weapons.

=== Additional content ===
A number of software updates were added to Gangstar Vegas after its initial release, among them a Saints Row-esque Gangstar vs. Aliens pack, and a Christmas-themed update adding new clothing and vehicles such as a rocket-powered sleigh. Also, the game has since been released as a free-to-play title, with bonus content available through microtransactions. Its frequent use of updating also received criticism from some fans and critics, who noted the lack of weapons, vehicles, and costumes, and the laggy graphics.

== Plot ==
Professional MMA fighter Jason "the Kid" Malone is bribed by casino owner and powerful Mafia boss Frank Veliano to take a dive in a match against opponent Pietro Holston, but Pietro falls before Jason can take the dive. As a result, he is chased by Frank and his henchmen before Karen Olsen, the accountant and bodyguard of mob queenpin Vera "Leatherface" Montello, arrives and helps him escape. Jason later works for Karen, Vera, and their associate Eric—a pimp and drug maker-dealer more commonly known as "E-Man"—in causing chaos against the Velianos.

Frank and his henchmen later storm a celebration held by the Montellos, capturing Jason and forcing him to work for the Velianos, including Frank's right-hand man Benny, and mayoral candidate Reverend Winston "Preacher" Goodman. Jason steals a boat, a seaplane, and a helicopter for the Velianos, alongside fighting the Huevos—a Hispanic street gang. After crashing a Huevos party, however, Jason finds out that the Velianos have kidnapped Karen and are forcing Vera to hand over her strip club, Fire and Vice, to Frank in exchange for Karen.

Jason helps the Montellos save Karen by stealing wire-tapping devices from a military base and planting them to pinpoint Frank and Karen's position. He later joins E-Man and Vera to help raid Frank's casino, where Karen is held. They rescue her and escape Frank's men, but at the cost of Vera sacrificing herself to stop reinforcements, feeling remorse for bribing Pietro to also dive during the MMA fight that led to Jason being targeted by the Velianos in the first place.

Enraged by Vera's loss and learning that Frank ordered her father's murder, Karen wants Jason out of the Mafia war. Jason saves her again from Veliano, convincing her to accept his help. Karen then kisses him before reclaiming the Fire and Vice from the Velianos. Jason later sabotages Frank's villa and uses the media—the only business in Vegas not controlled by the Velianos—to mock the LVPD's incompetence, with them being under Frank’s payroll.

Finding that Benny has been arrested, Frank attempts to take him out, but Jason rescues him when Frank's men intercept the police convoy. He provides photos of Goodman's debauchery, which Jason then uses to blackmail the reverend into turning against the Velianos. Cornered and betrayed, and with the FBI on his tail, Frank decides to flee Las Vegas with his money.

Jason learns that Frank has dispatched a helicopter to pick up and that he is waiting on top of a casino, so he steals the helicopter before Frank's pilot can arrive. He flies to the casino's landing pad and confronts Frank. A fistfight ensues, ending with the latter shooting at the former, but hitting the helicopter's fuel tank instead, which begins leaking out. Jason activates a lighter and throws it on the fuel at Frank's feet, setting him on fire. In a last-ditch effort, he rams a cart of money at Jason who dives out of the way, causing Frank to fall off the building and die by impalement on the fountain below. Jason then parachutes into Karen's car and drives away. Meanwhile, the local crowd celebrates Frank's death as money from the cart falls from the sky.

== Reception ==
Reception

Aggregate score
Aggregator	Score
Metacritic	61/100

Review score
Publication	Score
TouchArcade	4/5

The game received mixed reviews upon release, earning a score of 61 out of 100 at Metacritic. TouchArcade gave Gangstar Vegas four stars out of five in a review, called the game "open-ended, violent, destruction-filled fun" and praised the game's graphics, but criticised the "hit and miss" voice acting, controls and technical issues. Player feedback, however, is extremely positive, with an average rating above 4.4/5 on the Google Play Store and the App Store.
