= Paris Nights =

2008 video game

- Cover art of Paris Nights on the J2ME
- Developer(s): Gameloft
- Publisher(s): Gameloft
- Director(s): Matthieu Gosnet, Stanislas Dewavrin
- Producer(s): Jerome Levy, Etienne Morin
- Designer(s): Azka Suzuku, Ber Cohen, Danny Godin, Dominique Lemire-Nault
- Programmer(s): Louis-David Lavoie, Reda Baydoun, Jean-Claude Hamel, Mathieu Grenier II, Alain Cadieux
- Artist(s): Christophe Brand, Alex Lan, Yu Gao, Julien Manouvrier
- Writer(s): Aska Suzuki, Tammy Blythe Goodman
- Composer(s): Enrique Dizeo, Angel Cabral
- Series: Nights
- Platform(s): J2ME
- Release: 2008
- Genre(s): Dating simulator, virtual life, strategy
- Mode(s): Single-player

Paris Nights is a 2008 game developed and released by Gameloft for the J2ME platform. It is part of the Nights series by Gameloft.

== Reception ==
Paris Nights received generally positive reviews. Pocket Gamer said "Overall it's a lot of fun with a lot of tongue-in-cheek conversations and interactions and vast map-fulls of colourful visuals. There are just a few criticisms." They gave the game 8/10 points.
