= The Oregon Trail (2021 video game) =

- Developer: Gameloft Brisbane
- Publisher: Gameloft
- Series: The Oregon Trail
- Platforms: Apple Arcade; Microsoft Windows; Nintendo Switch; Nintendo Switch 2 PlayStation 4 PlayStation 5 Xbox Series X|S
- Release: 2021
- Genres: Strategy, Adventure, Simulation
- Mode: Single-player

The Oregon Trail is a video game developed by Gameloft Brisbane and published by Gameloft released in 2021. It is a complete remake of The Oregon Trail from 1985.

The game was initially released on Apple Arcade, then later on Nintendo Switch, PC, PlayStation and Xbox. It was released as a physical edition on the Nintendo Switch and PlayStation 5 in 2024.

Unlike most current Gameloft games, the game does not have micro-transactions and does not require a mandatory internet connection.

== Description ==
The player leads a group of pioneers on a journey across the American West, managing resources (food, equipment, health, morale, and hygiene) and making decisions in response to random events and the challenges of the terrain. This modernized version differs from previous entries by featuring a more developed narrative, with dialogue, longer scenarios, side quests, and a larger cast of playable characters. The gameplay includes survival and management activities such as hunting, fishing, and foraging, inventory management, and wagon maintenance, as well as mini-games. Several routes are available, some inspired by historical events, increasing the variety of playthroughs. The art direction combines pixel-art characters with 3D environments and modern visual effects, while the soundtrack blends country elements with retro sounds. The game also offers optional online events that require an internet connection, unlike the rest of the game.

== Reception and awards ==
The game received generally positive feedback. Critics noted that the remake places greater emphasis on Native American narratives and that player choices had a stronger impact on the course of the adventure, although some reviewers pointed out repetitivity over time.

It was the most downloaded game on Apple Arcade in 2021.

The game received several awards, including Best Narrative at the Pocket Gamer Mobile Games Awards 2021, Excellence in Mobile Games and Excellence in Ongoing Games at the Australian Game Developer Awards and best storytelling, best Original Game Soundtrack (composed by Pascal Dion and Nicolas Dube) and best Game Audio & Radio at the NYX Game Awards.
