= Order & Chaos Online =

2011 video game

- Developer: Gameloft Beijing
- Publisher: Gameloft
- Composer: Maxime Goulet (additional music)
- Series: Order & Chaos
- Platforms: iOS, Android, Microsoft Windows, Windows Phone, Ouya
- Release: June 23, 2011
- Genre: Massively multiplayer online role-playing game

Order & Chaos Online was a fantasy MMORPG video game developed by Gameloft's Beijing studio for Microsoft Windows, Windows Phone, iOS, and Android devices. The game was released for iOS on April 27, 2011, for Android on June 27, 2012, and for Windows 8.1 and Windows Phone on July 10, 2013. A successor titled Order & Chaos 2: Redemption was released in 2015. The game was permanently closed by Gameloft on 16 February 2023 on all platforms.

== Reception ==
Reception

Aggregate score
Aggregator	Score
Metacritic	82/100

The game received "generally favorable" reviews, according to video game review aggregator Metacritic.
