= Bluey's Happy Snaps =

- Developer: Gameloft Brisbane
- Publisher: Gameloft
- Series: Bluey
- Engine: Unreal Engine 5
- Platforms: Nintendo Switch; Nintendo Switch 2; PlayStation 4; PlayStation 5; Windows; Xbox One; Xbox Series X/S
- Release: 15 October 2026
- Genres: Adventure, photography
- Modes: Single-player, multiplayer

Bluey's Happy Snaps is an adventure-photography video game developed by Gameloft Brisbane and published by Gameloft. The fifth video game to be based on the animated television series Bluey, it is an offline experience without microtransactions that tasks players with exploring open environments and taking photos to add to a scrapbook. It was released for Nintendo Switch, Nintendo Switch 2, PlayStation 4, PlayStation 5, Windows, Xbox One, and Xbox Series X/S on 15 October 2026.

== Gameplay ==
Bluey's Happy Snaps is an adventure game revolving around photography. It sees Bluey and Bingo Heeler aiming to fill a scrapbook with photos using their father's old instant camera. The player is tasked with photographing various objects and characters in the freely-explorable environments, which are set in various locations from the Bluey television series; these locations are based on real-life locations that appear in the show, such as New Farm Park. The pause menu can be consulted to provide hints. Stickers and colouring book pages can be obtained by adding photos to a scrapbook, which can be customised using the earned rewards. In addition, players can pose for one another's pictures in the multiplayer mode, and photos of themselves can be taken by asking a non-player character to do so.

== Release ==
Bluey's Happy Snaps was first announced at the March 2026 Xbox Partner Preview. The game was developed by Gameloft Brisbane, with the involvement of Screen Queensland, BBC Studios and Bluey producer Ludo Studio, and published by Gameloft. The game is presented as an offline experience that does not contain microtransactions, with a deluxe edition featuring a set of cosmetics and an album of production art that is accessible in-game. It was released for Nintendo Switch, Nintendo Switch 2, PlayStation 4, PlayStation 5, Windows, Xbox One, and Xbox Series X and Series S on 15 October 2026. To promote the title, a trailer featuring Bindi Irwin (sister of Robert, who guest-starred as Alfie in the television series) was released.

A physical release for all consoles except for PlayStation 4 was published in partnership with Bandai Namco, except in Japan, where Sega distributes the physical version in partnership with Gameloft. Physical releases feature activity cards that depict real-life activities inspired by the show. An Activity Book Edition that bundles the base game, the deluxe edition upgrade, and a physical activity book was also made available.

== Reception ==
Reception

Aggregate scores
Aggregator	Score
Metacritic	(NS2) 78/100
OpenCritic	92% recommend

Review score
Publication	Score
Nintendo Life	8/10

The Nintendo Switch 2 version of Bluey's Happy Snaps received generally favourable reviews from critics, according to the review aggregation website Metacritic. Fellow review aggregator OpenCritic assessed that the game received strong approval, being recommended by 86% of critics. In his review for Nintendo Life, Ollie Reynolds wrote that "this latest adventure brings things back to basics, making for a charming, lighthearted experience that kids will absolutely enjoy".
