= Dungeon Hunter 5 =

2015 video game

- Developer: Gameloft Montreal
- Publishers: Android, iOS, Windows Phone, Windows 10; Gameloft; PlayStation 4, PlayStation Vita; Laplace
- Series: Dungeon Hunter
- Platforms: iOS, Android, Windows Phone, Windows 10, PlayStation 4, PlayStation Vita
- Release: Android, iOS, Windows Phone, Windows 10: WW: March 11, 2015; PlayStation 4, PlayStation Vita: JP: July 13, 2018
- Genres: Action role-playing, hack and slash
- Mode: online multiplayer

Dungeon Hunter 5 is a 2015 hack and slash role-playing game developed by Gameloft Montreal and published by Gameloft. It was released on March 11, 2015, for iOS, Android, Windows Phone and Windows 10 devices. The game serves as a direct sequel to Dungeon Hunter 4 which ended amidst the dying Valenthia city state. Dungeon Hunter 5 is an online game that requires an internet connection in order to play.

== Gameplay ==
The basic gameplay of Dungeon Hunter 5 shares some similarities to its predecessor, Dungeon Hunter 4, such as picking up loot, using skill attacks and using potions. However, unlike its predecessor, the game is not an open-world nor exploration, but rather a level-based dungeons that have a series of difficulties. As players progress, they will encounter progressively enemies to test their skills. Dungeon Hunter 5 does not contain a class system; instead players choose a starter type of weapon in the beginning in the game. The player character can also add friends though they can no longer co-op in missions. There is also an energy system which restricts the players from performing too many dungeons.

Aside from these main features, there is also a new mode called Stronghold in which player characters can collect minions to place them inside the stronghold. A new type of currency called quartz can be used for fusing minions. If a player fights and raids another player, their shield will switch off, thus making them vulnerable to attacks from other players. This has a level up ranks which forces the players to fight even more powerful players across their strongholds. There is also a trophy system in which players can gain trophies by winning, but it can decrease if they lose the raid attempt.

The loot system has also been expanded, not just the melee weapons, ranged weapons and armor body parts, but also the evolution items, skill weapons, backpacks and belts. A new fusion system has also been implemented in which players can pick an item and fuse it with unequipped or unwanted ones. Prior to the loot and fusion system, there is an evolution system where the item's level is maxed out, the player can use evolution materials to evolve them.

== Setting ==
Dungeon Hunter 5 is primarily set in the shattered world called Valenthia, the same as were the previous game was set. The city overall is more detailed and has much better shadows than its predecessor.

== Rail accident ==
During the prosecution of the dispatcher that caused the Bad Aibling rail accident, where 12 people died and 89 were injured, he admitted playing Dungeon Hunter 5 on his smartphone during work.
