= Grand Theft Auto clone =

Video game subgenre

Grand Theft Auto III is credited with popularizing a game genre based on driving and shooting in an open world environment.

A Grand Theft Auto clone (often shortened to GTA clone) belongs to a subgenre of open world action-adventure video games, characterized by their likeness to the Grand Theft Auto series in either gameplay or overall design. In these types of open world games, players may find and use a variety of vehicles and weapons while roaming freely in an open world setting. The objective of Grand Theft Auto clones is to complete a sequence of core missions involving driving and shooting, but often side-missions and minigames are added to improve replay value. The storylines of games in this subgenre typically have strong themes of crime, violence and other controversial elements such as drugs and sexually explicit content.

The subgenre has its origins in open world action adventure games popularized in Europe (and particularly the United Kingdom) throughout the 1980s and 1990s. The release of Grand Theft Auto (1997) marked a major commercial success for open-ended game design in North America, and featured a more marketable crime theme, but it was the popularity of its 3D sequel Grand Theft Auto III in 2001 that led to the widespread propagation of a more specific set of gameplay conventions consistent with a subgenre. The subgenre now includes many games from different developers all over the world where the player can control wide ranges of vehicles and weapons. The subgenre has evolved with greater levels of environmental detail and more realistic behaviors.

As usage of the term "clone" often has a negative connotation and can be seen as controversial, reviewers have come up with other names for the subgenre. Similar terminology for other genres, such as "Donkey Kong-type" and "Doom clone", has given way to more neutral language. Names such as "sandbox game", however, are applied to a wider range of games that do not share key features of the Grand Theft Auto series.

== Definition ==
A Grand Theft Auto clone is a video game that falls within the genre popularized by the 2001 title Grand Theft Auto III, where players are given the ability to drive any vehicle or fire any weapon as they explore an open world. These games are sometimes treated as a 3D action-adventure game, or third-person shooter. They are noted for frequently bearing strong violent or criminal themes, though exceptions like The Simpsons: Hit & Run and American McGee Presents: Scrapland have copied its gameplay and structure with a Teen rating. The game Lego City Undercover was released the same year as GTA V and drew similar comparisons, albeit generally positive, and was given an E10+ rating by the ESRB.

=== Other terminology ===
Calling a game a "Grand Theft Auto clone" is sometimes considered unfair or insulting. This is because reviewers sometimes use this term to suggest that the "clone" is a mere imitation, which commonly occurs in the video game industry, designed for the sole purpose of capitalizing on the success of the Grand Theft Auto series. However, this term can also be used as a neutral description of a game, which can range from good to bad. Reviewers have used "Grand Theft Auto clone" to describe games that rest on their own merits, and do not necessarily dismiss the entire class of games as mere imitators.

Games of this type are sometimes defined under the broader terminology "open world games" or "sandbox games", but many games that predate Grand Theft Auto III, such as Metroid from 1986, are also called open world games. Conflictingly, games such as Grand Theft Auto III and Body Harvest are credited with inventing this genre more than a decade later. Furthermore, reviewers have stated that this genre does not include every game with a freely explorable world and that this genre is much more specific, thus excluding the free-roaming titles Spider-Man 2 and The Incredible Hulk: Ultimate Destruction from this class of games. The terminology is inconsistent, sometimes including any game with open level design, while other times focusing on a specific genre created at the turn of the century.

Without clear classifications to describe the genre popularized by Grand Theft Auto, reviewers have created a number of alternate names for this genre. Some reviewers have focused on the pervasive criminal themes and mature content in the genre, using terminology such as "crime games", "crime-based action games", and what CNN called the "gangsta genre". Other journalists have emphasized gameplay by describing the genre as "free roaming action adventure games", "driving-and-shooting games", and "driving action hybrids".

== Game design ==
=== Driving and shooting ===
Grand Theft Auto clones offer players the ability to steal and drive a number of vehicles. Games have included all kinds of vehicles, such as cars, motorcycles, helicopters, boats, fixed-wing aircraft, and military vehicles. Reviewers have compared these games based on the number of vehicles they offer, with greater choice resulting in better reviews. Players can also use vehicles as weapons, either by driving into enemies, or by damaging the vehicle until it explodes. Some games allow vehicles to perform stunts. Games in the genre thus incorporate elements of driving simulation games. Some games even allow players to customize their vehicles.

Players can engage in combat using a range of weapons depending on the game setting, such as firearms, explosives, close-range melee weapons, or even exaggerated fictional weapons (e.g. laser weapons or a hand-held minigun). As such, several reviewers have stated that games in this genre are partially third-person shooters. Players can find weapons scattered throughout the game world, and may buy weapons in shops or take them from dead enemies. Virtually anyone in the game world can be attacked by the player. In many games, excessive violent behavior will provoke a reaction by police authorities, who the player may then choose to fight or evade. Players must also keep track of their health and ammunition in order to succeed in combat.

These games have employed a variety of aiming mechanisms, such as free look aiming or a "lock-on" button. Several games have been criticized for difficult or burdensome controls when it comes to shooting, and thus video game designers have tried to refine the aiming and shooting controls in these games.

=== Open world and missions ===
Grand Theft Auto clones allow players to freely explore the game world, which is typically on the scale of an entire city. Some games base their level design on real world cities, such as London, New York City, and Los Angeles. Players are usually able to navigate by vehicle or on foot. Some games put greater emphasis on leaping, climbing, and even swimming. Exploring the world is not just necessary to complete objectives, but also to gain valuable items, weapons, and vehicles. Different parts of the game world may be controlled by different enemy factions, who will attempt to stop the player in a variety of ways. More recent games in this genre allow players to acquire their own territory. The freedom of navigating a huge game world may be overwhelming or confusing for new players. Game designers have come up with a variety of navigational aids to solve this problem. A mini-map feature is common, while Saints Row and Grand Theft Auto IV go so far as to offer a GPS service. Games without these navigation tools are sometimes criticized as confusing.

The player's freedom to explore may be limited until they complete certain objectives and advance the game plot. Players must visit specific locations and complete specific missions in order to win the game, such as racing, tailing, couriering, robbing, stealing, shooting, assassinating, and driving to specific checkpoints. There may be multiple ways to complete these missions as the game environment is designed to facilitate shortcuts, experimentation, and creative ways to kill enemies. Completing a core mission will unlock further missions and advance the storyline, and if the player fails a mission they will be able to resume the game from before the mission began. In addition, these games usually offer optional side missions, which allow players to gain other rewards. These side missions improve the game's replay value. These games are also known for incorporating numerous minigames into the game world, such as circuit races. Ultimately, this allows the player to follow or ignore the game's storyline as they see fit.

== History ==
=== Origin ===
Open world, 3D action-adventure games existed for years prior to the release of any similar game from the Scottish developer DMA Design. Mercenary (1985) has been described as a major ancestor to the Grand Theft Auto series, because it featured an open world which the player could explore freely. Turbo Esprit, the first free-roaming driving game, featured an explorable city with traffic, pedestrians and working traffic lights and has been cited as a major influence on the Grand Theft Auto series. The Terminator, released in 1991, was a free-form, open world game that set its action in a modern-day city that extended for miles, and included the ability to fire at civilians and steal cars. This game was also among the first American-developed games to feature these elements.

Hunter (1991) has been described as the first sandbox game featuring full 3D, third-person graphics, thus making it an important precursor to the Grand Theft Auto series. The game consisted of a large, open world in which there were numerous possibilities to complete different missions. The character could travel on foot, or steal different vehicles such as cars, tanks, or even bicycles, boats, helicopters and hovercraft. Moreover, Hunter also had many unique features such as day and night lighting, fuel modelling, a log book, aerial observation units, tank traps, land mines and computer-controlled rocket batteries and tracer guns. It was also possible to ride a bicycle, swim, windsurf or even make a parachute jump from a helicopter.

DMA Design began pursuing open world game design with the first Grand Theft Auto, which allowed players to commandeer various automobiles and shoot various weapons within a mission-based structure. Unlike later games in the series, and indeed many earlier influences, the first two GTA games were 2D, using a top-down perspective. In 1998, DMA moved many of these design concepts into a 3D world, with Body Harvest, a Nintendo 64 game developed by DMA Design. This title featured an open world with nonlinear missions and side-quests, as well as the ability to commandeer and drive a variety of vehicles. As such, it has been retroactively called "GTA in space" (despite the fact that most of the game takes place in various settings on Earth), and is credited with making Grand Theft Auto III possible. Dan Houser has also cited the 3D Mario and Zelda games on the Nintendo 64 as major influences.

In 1999, Midtown Madness was released by Angel Studios. This driving game was 3D and featured an open world in an urban environment like Grand Theft Auto. It was however not a sandbox game, as the player could only choose one of the pre-defined gameplay modes. Travelling on foot or switching cars during gameplay was not possible. Rockstar Games approached Angel Studios with a long-term partnership in 1999, which resulted in the creation of video game series Midnight Club (another open world 3D race game) and Smuggler's Run. In November 2000, almost a year before Grand Theft Auto III, Driver 2 by Reflections came out. Set in a 3D open world in an urban environment with the ability to traverse on foot and commandeer other vehicles, Driver 2 featured many aspects of what would later become known as a Grand Theft Auto clone, though violence was restricted to cutscenes.

Grand Theft Auto III took the gameplay foundation of the first two Grand Theft Auto games and expanded it into a 3D world, and offered an unprecedented variety of minigames and side-missions. The title was a much greater commercial success than its direct precursors, and its influence was profound. As such, Grand Theft Auto III is credited with popularizing this genre, let alone inventing it. Its release is sometimes treated as a revolutionary event in the history of video games, much like the release of Doom nearly a decade earlier. GamePro called it the most important game of all time, and claimed that every genre was influenced to rethink their conventional level design. IGN similarly praised it as one of the top ten most influential games of all time. Subsequent games that follow this formula of driving and shooting in a free-roaming level have been called Grand Theft Auto clones.

Other critics, however, likened Grand Theft Auto III to The Legend of Zelda and Metroid, as well as Shenmue in particular, and noted how GTA III had combined elements from previous games and fused them together into a new immersive experience. For instance, radio stations had been implemented earlier in games such as Sega's Out Run (1986) and Maxis' SimCopter (1996), open-ended missions based on operating a taxi cab in a sandbox environment were the basis for Sega's Crazy Taxi (1999), the ability to kill non-player characters dated back to action role-playing games like Hydlide II (1985), and Final Fantasy Adventure (1991), and the way in which players run over pedestrians and get chased by police has been compared to Pac-Man (1980).

=== Recent history ===
One of the first games to be compared to Grand Theft Auto's foray into the 3D video game landscape was Mafia. Its development during the same time and release a year later in 2002 had a few review websites draw comparisons, notably comparing the open world city and driving. These comparisons were mostly positive, with Game Informer writing "This is a lot like GTA III. Awesome!" and "There's no shame in taking a proven gameplay formula and changing it a little bit" in its review.

Rockstar North finished development of Grand Theft Auto: Vice City later that year, which expanded on the open world concept by letting players explore the interior of more than sixty buildings. The game featured an expanded soundtrack and the voice talent of several Hollywood actors, including Ray Liotta. This set a new standard for the genre, making studio talent a pre-requisite for success. Other game developers entered the field that year, with releases such as The Getaway. The Simpsons: Hit & Run in 2003 applied the concept to a cartoon world, while True Crime: Streets of LA reversed the Grand Theft Auto formula by putting the player in the role of a police officer. Some reviewers began warning parents of the growing number of games in this genre, due to the violent themes intended for mature audiences. The Driver series, which itself was an influence on Grand Theft Auto III, also borrowed elements from the Grand Theft Auto series thereafter such as gun combat, leading to Driver 3 in 2004 and Driver: Parallel Lines in 2006 also having been referred to as GTA clones.

Ultimately, rival developers were unable to match the reception of the Grand Theft Auto series. Rockstar North released Grand Theft Auto: San Andreas in 2004, which featured an open world on the scale of three distinct cities. The game also allowed players to customize the player-character and vehicles, as well as compete for turf by fighting with rival gangs. The continued success of the Grand Theft Auto series led to successful spin-offs, including Grand Theft Auto: Liberty City Stories in 2005, Grand Theft Auto: Vice City Stories in 2006, and the 2D Grand Theft Auto Advance for the Game Boy Advance handheld game console. A market analysis in early 2006 found that new games in this genre would have more difficulty than new first-person shooters or racing games, and noted that overall revenue for this genre declines during periods without a new Grand Theft Auto game. By 2006, developers were producing fewer games in this space, estimated at half the number seen in 2005. Grand Theft Auto clones for mobile phones were also released by a number of developers, most notably those from Gameloft's Gangstar series, the first being Gangstar: Crime City in 2006.

With the arrival of the seventh generation of video game consoles, the first "next-gen" Grand Theft Auto clones were released in 2006. Beginning with Saints Row from 2006 and Crackdown from 2007 both introduced online multiplayer to the genre, a feature that had been requested by many fans. Chris Stockman, the creator of Saints Row, admitted that the game was a "ripoff" of GTA III and borrowed its design wholesale, but released at a time when there was no other competition for games on the Xbox 360, and believes that if Saints Row was released after GTA IV, the game would have never succeeded. Crackdown attracted attention for being created by David Jones, the developer of the original Grand Theft Auto, and featured the ability to develop the player character's superpowers in a semi-futuristic setting. Meanwhile, The Godfather: The Game and Scarface: The World Is Yours entered the market in 2006, and attempted to apply the Grand Theft Auto formula to popular film franchises. Still, reviewers continued to measure these games against the standard set by the Grand Theft Auto series. Grand Theft Auto IV was released in April 2008 and featured a large, detailed environment, redefining gameplay and even adopted the GPS navigation system seen in Saints Row. The game broke numerous sales records, including the record for the fastest selling game in its first 24 hours. Since its inception, this genre has evolved to include larger settings, more missions, and a wider range of vehicles. In 2010, Rockstar Games published Red Dead Redemption, an open world Western themed game. Later that year, the second entry in the Mafia series, Mafia II, was released by 2K Games and met with a few comparisons to Grand Theft Auto as well. On the day of Grand Theft Auto V's release on September 17, 2013, Volition released a free downloadable content pack for Saints Row IV titled "GATV", purposely playing the similarity in the abbreviated titles to promote their game due to the confusion raised on various social networks. The Assassin's Creed media franchise, while centred around historical conspiracy fiction based on a heavily fictionalised centuries-old rivalry between the Order of Assassins and the Knights Templar, also saw comparisons to Grand Theft Auto with the 2015 sequel Assassin's Creed Syndicate, whose turf-based gang warfare mechanic was likened to a similar gameplay feature in San Andreas.

Variations of the Grand Theft Auto formula have also been applied to games aimed at children and younger audiences, most notably with Lego City Undercover, first released in 2013 for the Wii U with a remastered version for Microsoft Windows, Nintendo Switch, PlayStation 4 and Xbox One released in 2017. As is with the True Crime and later Sleeping Dogs games, the game is role-reversed with the player taking on the role of a police officer enforcing the law, rather than of a criminal, although the player is required to commit criminal acts on some occasions in order to infiltrate criminal gangs, albeit in a tone and manner appropriate for the game's intended target audience. Lego City Undercover also drew comparisons with its predecessor Lego Island as both shared elements of open-world gameplay and exploration not unlike Grand Theft Auto. Another lesser-known example is the 2011 Wii open world sports game Go Vacation, described by IGN reviewer Audrey Drake as Wii Sports Resort meets Grand Theft Auto, in which players can freely roam four different resorts in a variety of vehicles.

In 2025, an upcoming open-world action game Last Drop developed by Finnish studio Lohkare Games, often described as a "Finnish GTA", was announced. Featuring protagonist Seppo Sahtivaara, the game focuses on 90s Finnish nostalgia in the city of Nykylä, featuring fighting and story-driven gameplay. The demo version was released on Steam in March 2026, and the game itself was released in Early Access in August 2026.

== See also ==
- Vehicle simulation game
