= Battle Tanks =

2009 video game

- Developer(s): Gameloft
- Publisher(s): Gameloft
- Producer(s): Jerome Levy
- Designer(s): Stephane Varrault
- Artist(s): Arthur Hugot
- Composer(s): Maxime Goulet (main composer); Mathieu Vachon
- Platform(s): PlayStation 3
- Release: September 3, 2009
- Genre(s): Multidirectional shooter
- Mode(s): Single-player, multiplayer

Battle Tanks (or Tank Battles outside of North America) is a multidirectional shooter developed and published by Gameloft for the PlayStation 3. It was released on the PlayStation Store on September 3, 2009.

The game can be played offline or online with humans or bot opponents. It also contains multiple maps and skins. There are in-game purchases.
