= Gangstar: Crime City =

2006 video game

- Title screen
- Developer: Gameloft
- Publisher: Gameloft
- Designer: Gameloft
- Series: Gangstar
- Platforms: Mobile phone, J2ME
- Release: October 2006
- Genre: Action-adventure
- Mode: Single-player

Gangstar: Crime City is a 2006 open-world action-adventure video game developed and published by Gameloft. It was released in October 2006 for mobile phones.

A second installment in the series, Gangstar 2: Kings of L.A., was released in November 2008.

== Gameplay ==
Gangstar: Crime City is a side-scrolling top-down two-dimensional (2D) action-adventure video game. The game world may be traversed on foot or by vehicle. Crime City, the titular (fictitious) setting of the game, is almost like a combination of Los Angeles and Miami (consisting mostly of Miami-based areas). Areas such as Ocean Beach (as used in Grand Theft Auto: Vice City) and Ocean Drive are examples. Policemen and their vehicles are patterned after the LAPD.

The game world is structured as an open one with a sandbox-based environment, affording the player a sizeable area in which to move around; it is divided into two maps representing an upscale and a run-down suburban district respectively. On foot, the player is able to run and shoot at pedestrians and cars and it is possible to operate a variety of vehicles. While storyline missions are necessary to progress through the game, they are not mandatory as players can complete them at their own leisure. Aside from the main storyline, players can also partake in side-activities such as street racing, purchasing properties such as a restaurant and a recording label, and drug-dealing (though given the heavily-censored nature of the game, euphemisms like "candies" and other confectionery-related terms are used to avoid any direct references to narcotics).

At gun shops, the player can buy weapons (including a pistol that has infinite ammunition, the Uzi (which is used to commit drive-by shootings), a pump-action shotgun, the AK-47 assault rifle, a sniper rifle, and a rocket launcher (which is only found in certain places and some missions), additional health and bodyguards. Hand-to-hand combat and melee attacks aren't available in the game.

== Reception ==
Gangstar: Crime City received mixed to positive reception from critics, with praise given to the gameplay and Gameloft's efforts at bringing a Grand Theft Auto-like experience to mobile devices, which hasn't seen any official release from Rockstar up until the tenth anniversary mobile release of Grand Theft Auto III in 2011. IGN's Levi Buchanan gave Crime City a score of 7.4 put of 10, stating "If you can get into Gangstar without any expectation other than a reasonable facsimile of the GTA experience on the smallest screen at a bargain price, there are definitely some kicks to be had. Just keep your tongue planted firmly in cheek while playing." In a similarly positive review, Pocket Gamer also noted the game being heavily based on Grand Theft Auto, stating "although it's not the best it could be, Gangstar: Crime City is a good stab/shot/other-violent-metaphorical-verb at turning GTA into mobile form. Solid, if not completely polished," While both reviewers noted the game's open world and missions, its stereotypical portrayal of gangsta rap and hip-hop culture was criticised and ridiculed as being cliche and tongue-in-cheek.

== See also ==
- Gangstar (video game series)
- Grand Theft Auto (video game series)
- Grand Theft Auto clone
