= Gangstar =

Video game series

- Official series logo used since Gangstar New Orleans
- Genres: Action-adventure; Grand Theft Auto Clone
- Developers: Gameloft Montreal; Gameloft Kharkiv; Gameloft Tokyo
- Publisher: Gameloft
- Platforms: Mobile phone; Java ME; BREW; DoJa; BlackBerry OS; Nintendo DSi; Mac OS X; Android; iOS; Microsoft Windows
- First release: Gangstar: Crime City; October 2006
- Latest release: Gangstar Mirage City; 2026 (gradual rollout)

Gangstar is a series of open-world action-adventure video games published by video game company Gameloft and developed by its subsidiaries.

Games in the Gangstar series are generally set in American cities (although Gangstar Rio: City of Saints is set in Rio de Janeiro, a Brazilian city and Gangstar Mirage City takes place in a fictional city). Gameplay focuses on an open world where the player can choose missions at their own leisure to progress an overall story, as well as engaging in side-activities consisting of action-adventure, driving, shooting, occasional role-playing, stealth and racing elements. The series focuses on many different protagonists who attempt to rise through the ranks of the criminal underworld, although their motives for doing so vary in each game. The games in the series are inspired by the gameplay of the Grand Theft Auto franchise by Rockstar Games. In 2026, Gameloft announced that the license had surpassed 450 million downloads.

== Games ==
Release timeline
2006	Gangstar: Crime City
2007
2008	Gangstar 2: Kings of L.A.
2009	Gangstar: West Coast Hustle
2009	Gangstar: Samurai
2010	Gangstar: Miami Vindication
2011	Gangstar Rio: City of Saints
2012
2013	Gangstar City
2013	Gangstar Vegas
2014
2015
2016
2017	Gangstar: New Orleans
2018
2019
2020
2021
2022
2023
2024
2025
2026	Gangstar: Mirage City

=== Gangstar: Crime City (2006) ===
Gangstar: Crime City is a top-down, open-world action-adventure video game published by Gameloft and developed by at least one of its subsidiaries. It is about a gangster who explores the fictional town of Crime City looking for money, power, and occupation of other gangs.

=== Gangstar 2: Kings of LA (2008) ===
Gangstar 2: Kings of L.A. (spelled as Gangstar 2 Kings of LA in the BlackBerry OS version) is a video game published by Gameloft and developed by at least one of its subsidiaries. The version for button-operated/keypad-based mobile phones was released in November 2008, the BlackBerry OS version on August 5, 2009, and the Nintendo DSi version on April 12, 2010. The game is about gangster cousins Pedro (nicknamed Chico) and Juan, who have recently escaped from Mexico due to a pursuit from the police. They arrive in Los Angeles looking for money and power, alongside their cousin Luis "L.C." Custodio. A three-dimensional (3D) version of the game was released for the iPhone (App Store) and Android (Android Market) platforms in 2009, titled Gangstar: West Coast Hustle.

=== Gangstar: Samurai (2009) ===
Gangstar: Samurai is an open-world action-adventure video game published by Gameloft and developed by Gameloft Tokyo. It was released for BREW and DoJa only in Japan. The protagonist is Masato and the setting is Tokyo, Japan. The game had radio stations like Toshi Beat. Masato stole a banned drug from a smuggling organization due to a slight mistake in stealing. After being chased by the organization, Masato is saved by a shadowy beauty named Yuri who claims to be a special agent. In order for Yuri to destroy the organization and Masato to escape from it, the two work together to carry out various operations against it. The player can use a sword as a weapon, as well as various firearms such as pistols, submachine guns, shotguns, grenades, and bazookas. There are 45 types of missions, from simple mobile missions to defeating enemies and infiltration.

=== Gangstar: West Coast Hustle (2009) ===
Gangstar: West Coast Hustle is an open-world action-adventure video game published by Gameloft and developed by Gameloft Montreal. It was released for Android, iPhone, iPod Touch and webOS. Gangstar: West Coast Hustle HD is the version for Android and iPad, and Gangstar: West Coast Hustle - FREE is the free version for iPhone and iPod Touch. It is a 3D version of Gangstar 2: Kings of L.A.. It is the first game in the series to be 3D. A 'sequel' to the game entitled Gangstar: Miami Vindication was released in September 2010. In 2024, the game was removed from the Apple App Store. It was released on August 20, 2009, for iOS, on November 25, 2010, for Android,and June 10, 2010, for iPad.

=== Gangstar: Miami Vindication (2010) ===
Gangstar: Miami Vindication is an open-world action-adventure video game published by Gameloft and developed by at least one of its subsidiaries. It consists of a two-dimensional (2D) version and a 3D version, and was released for iOS, Mac OS X and Android. It follows Gangstar 2: Kings of L.A. and Gangstar: West Coast Hustle and is the third main game in the Gangstar series. The story follows Johnny Gainsville (spelled "Gainesville" in the 3D version), a middle-aged man in search for his younger brother Joey, who was last seen in Miami, who is driven into a life of crime.

Gangstar: Miami Vindication features helicopters, motorboats/boats/jet skis, and motorcycles. Police vehicles can be customized as well. The 3D version is the first game in the series to feature voice acting instead of only textual dialogues (albeit lacking any facial animations). The 3D version features more profanity than West Coast Hustle. Other than people, alligators can be killed, but do not give any benefit. According to the preview of the 3D version by Gameloft, the map is 1.5 times larger than West Coast Hustle. Although it is the successor to Kings of L.A. and West Coast Hustle, the only connections between the games are L.C.'s appearance, news flashes from Kings of L.A., and a reference to Eddie Fallon (in the 3D version's case). In 2012, a spin-off titled Urban Crime was released; it follows the aftermath of the departure of Johnny Gainesville from Miami. As of early 2018, the game has suddenly disappeared from the Apple App Store for unknown reasons.

=== Gangstar Rio: City of Saints (2011) ===
Gangstar Rio: City of Saints is an open-world action-adventure video game published by Gameloft and developed by at least one of its subsidiaries. It consists of a 2D version and a 3D version, and was released for button-operated/keypad-based mobile phones, Android, and iOS in 2011. The 3D version is set in modern-day Rio de Janeiro, Brazil.

=== Gangstar City (2013) ===
Gangstar City is an open-world action-adventure video game published by Gameloft and developed by at least one of its subsidiaries. It is a sequel to Kings of L.A. and West Coast Hustle, with the story focusing on Garcia, Kings of L.A. and West Coast Hustle protagonist Pedro's brother, who has recently escaped from Mexico. Not long after the beginning of the story, Pedro goes missing; Garcia, along with Luis, his teammates, and friends, must defeat all gangs who have been suspected to be involved in his disappearance. It was released for button-operated/keypad-based mobile phones and Android in 2013. Unlike other games in the series, this is primarily an interaction-based "city"-building installment that mostly feels like an idle video game.

=== Gangstar Vegas (2013) ===
Gangstar Vegas (also known as Gangstar Vegas: City of Sin and Gangstar Vegas: World of Crime) is an open-world action-adventure video game published by Gameloft and developed by its Montreal-based subsidiary (Gameloft Montreal). The story revolves around Jason Malone, a skilled mixed martial arts (MMA) fighter who is targeted by mobster Frank Veliano after seemingly knocking out his opponent during a professional match by mistake, in what was supposed to be a fixed round. Gangstar Vegas features "open-world" gameplay that gives the player more control over their playing experience and also slight graphical improvements in the cutscenes and gameplay.

=== Gangstar: New Orleans (2017) ===
Gangstar: New Orleans is an open-world action-adventure video game published by Gameloft and developed by its subsidiaries Gameloft Montreal for iOS and Android. Gameplay is similar to its predecessor; it is set in New Orleans and normally requires a persistent Internet connection to run. Vehicles are the same compared to the previous installment but there are a few new cars. There are online events that anyone can participate in to win awards. The map is greatly enlarged and completely different in its composition compared to Gangstar Vegas. There are also many rewards that can be achieved by watching advertisements.

=== Gangstar: New York (canceled) ===
Gameloft Bucharest worked on a sequel for PC and console; two alpha versions of the game were released on Steam in 2022 and 2023, before the game was cancelled and replaced with Dragon Mania Skyhaven project, a cozy open world, to be released in 2027.

Gangstar: Mirage City (2027)

In 2026, Gameloft announced the development of Gangstar Mirage City. For the first time in the history of the Gangstar series, the game is not being developed directly by an internal Gameloft studio, but by Level Infinite (from the Tencent group), an external studio collaborating with the publisher on this installment. The game is currently in alpha testing in the Philippines. A phased global rollout is planned starting in August 2026. It is planned for mobile platforms exclusively. The game will be made available worldwide, including in the United States, in 2027.
