= Disney Dreamlight Valley =

2023 life simulation video game

- Primary key artwork used since the game's early access period in 2022 (Note: Depicted in the artwork are, from left to right, Buzz Lightyear, Scar, Belle, a female depiction of the game's customizable player-character, WALL-E, Mickey Mouse, Stitch and Elsa.)
- Developer: Gameloft Montreal
- Publisher: Gameloft
- Engine: Unity
- Platforms: iOS (Apple Arcade); macOS; tvOS; Nintendo Switch; PlayStation 4; PlayStation 5; Windows; Xbox One; Xbox Series X/S; Nintendo Switch 2
- Release: iOS, macOS, tvOS, Nintendo Switch, PlayStation 4, PlayStation 5, Windows, Xbox One, Xbox Series X/S; December 5, 2023; Nintendo Switch 2; March 25, 2026
- Genres: Life simulation, adventure
- Modes: Single-player, multiplayer

Disney Dreamlight Valley is a 2023 life simulation adventure game developed by Gameloft Montreal and published by Gameloft. The game has players tend to a magical valley populated by various Disney and Pixar characters who previously underwent a curse that caused them to lose their memories of their lives in the valley.

The game was released in early access for Nintendo Switch, PlayStation 4, PlayStation 5, Windows, Xbox One, and Xbox Series X/S on September 6, 2022, while the macOS version released in early access on December 6, 2022, alongside the game's second content update. It was initially planned to be a free-to-play game, with the purchase of a "Founder's Pack" or an active Xbox Game Pass subscription needed to play the game in early access. However, its early access success led to Gameloft cancelling the free-to-play plans in October 2023, making the game a premium title permanently. The game was fully released on December 5, 2023, alongside its first paid expansion, A Rift in Time. An Arcade Edition for Apple Arcade, supporting iOS, macOS and tvOS was also released the same day. An enhanced Nintendo Switch 2 port of the game was released on March 25, 2026.

== Gameplay ==
Disney Dreamlight Valley takes place in the titular "Dreamlight Valley", a magical valley with various biomes populated by Disney and Pixar characters. The game features nonlinear gameplay similar to Nintendo's Animal Crossing games where players take control of a customizable human player character living in the valley. The valley is synced to real time based on the time set on the player's console or computer. The game's multiplayer mode involves visiting other players' Valleys.

The player can explore the valley to gather resources and use their magic to clear away "Night Thorns", unwanted plants with dark magic that spawn throughout the valley. Foods can be cooked into various meals at a cooking station such as an oven or a campfire, while other resources can be crafted into materials or furniture at a crafting station. The player can eat food to replenish energy, which is required to use magic-imbued tools including a pickaxe, a shovel, a fishing rod, and a watering can; meals can replenish greater amounts of energy than foods grown, harvested, or purchased in the valley, and can make the player "well fed", which gives them a movement speed boost, increased luck at getting resource bonuses, and the ability to sprint across the valley faster by gliding on magic (albeit at an energy cost). Furniture and certain objects can be placed and rearranged in the valley or inside the player's house, and the player can also move and rotate buildings in the valley to their liking. The player can also change their outfit and appearance at any time, clothing can be customized further by the player with a clothes and furniture designer option called "Touch of Magic". Unlike in the Animal Crossing games, the player's tools, clothing, and furniture do not take up space in their inventory; tools are selected using an option wheel and never break from use, while the inventory screen contains separate "wardrobe" and "furniture" options for clothing and furniture respectively.

The player can earn a currency called "Star Coins" during gameplay, usually by selling most items in their inventory to Goofy at various stalls run by him throughout the valley. Star Coins can be spent on crops and seeds sold by Goofy at his stalls, materials sold by Kristoff at his stall, certain foods that are only available at Remy's restaurant Chez Remy or from Gaston's stall (the latter found on the A Rift in Time expansion's Eternity Isle), or on clothes and furniture sold by Scrooge McDuck at his store. They can also be spent on new buildings or building upgrades (all handled in-universe by Scrooge's "McDuck Construction" company) that provide additional benefits, such as more items available at Goofy's stalls or more space in the player's house, or on wells strewn throughout the valley that allows the player to fast travel to different biomes.

The player can interact with and befriend the villagers, including heroes and villains. The player can build up a "friendship level" with that villager by having a daily discussion with them, giving them gifts, completing quests they assign the player, and (except for characters who can only swim in the valley's waters) hanging out with them and doing activities, including gardening, mining, digging, harvesting, and fishing; doing specific activities with a land-based villager, depending on the role the player assigns the villager at friendship level two, will earn the player more resources related to that activity. Raising a friendship level (up to level ten) with a villager will give the player rewards including Star Coins, exclusive furniture and clothes, and exclusive motifs for "Touch of Magic", as well as increased resources from hanging out with them and new quests.

== Plot ==
=== Main story ===
The game follows the player as they decide to spend some time away from the hustle and bustle of the city and return to their old rural home, falling asleep in their old backyard play area and entering a dream world as their memories of childhood return. Upon appearing in the titular Dreamlight Valley, the player is met by Merlin, who explains that Dreamlight Valley used to be full of villagers living in harmony, but after the valley's ruler disappeared, Night Thorns began growing and causing the villagers to lose their memories in an event known as "The Forgetting". While many villagers fled to their home realms for protection, others stayed and became trapped as Dreamlight Valley was overrun by Night Thorns and fell into disrepair. The player decides to help restore Dreamlight Valley and get rid of the Night Thorns.

With Merlin's help, the player is able to use their own magic, known as "Dreamlight", to clear away the Giant Night Thorns blocking access to the house resembling their own from back in reality. Recovering a memory hidden in the Night Thorns inside, the player and Merlin decide to investigate the Dream Castle, only to find the entrance blocked by giant Night Thorns. After meeting some of the villagers who stayed behind and recovering the Royal Tools, the eternal night spell over the valley is broken and the player clears away the giant Night Thorns, regaining access to the Dream Castle. Inside, they find doorways to various realms where the other villagers had fled when The Forgetting came, all sealed by Night Thorns. The player collects more Dreamlight and unlocks the doors, visiting the realms and helping the characters there with their problems, bringing them back to Dreamlight Valley to help restore it. Along the way, they help restore Dreamlight's local businesses and provide housing for the characters returning to Dreamlight Valley.

The player also opens up other regions of the valley blocked by giant Night Thorns, restoring them by returning the magic Orbs that protect the valley to their respective Pillars. As they restore Dreamlight Valley and help more villagers, the player gradually learns that they were the former ruler of Dreamlight Valley, having stopped visiting as they grew up and thus causing the Valley to fall into disrepair. The villagers also explain that the Forgetting and the appearance of the Night Thorns was caused by a dark being called the Forgotten.

As the player is about to restore the final Pillar, the Forgotten appears and steals the Orb, revealing themselves to be the player character's inner child, who was corrupted by negative emotions and fell into a deep depression. The Forgotten intends to use the Orb in a spell to create a rift that could destroy the valley. The player follows the Forgotten to their dark castle and talks to them, reminding them of their past memories and helping them accept themselves. The Forgotten shows remorse and works with the player to close the rift, and they are forgiven by the villagers and reintegrate into Dreamlight Valley with the player's help.

=== A Rift In Time ===
Jafar contacts the player, asking for their help to fix the damage he wrought on Eternity Isle, as his actions have severely damaged the space-time continuum there and he needs their help to undo it as he's trapped there until it is fixed. Merlin helps find the access route in the Dream Castle, which leads to the Stardust Port, where many docks are found that lead to other locations throughout Dreamlight Valley, and the player sets off for Eternity Isle. Once on Eternity Isle, the player gets to work under Jafar's direction to reopen the Ancient Gate that leads to more of Eternity Isle. The player also helps Goofy, Remy, and Scrooge reopen their Eternity Isle businesses that had been abandoned when The Forgetting happened. Mickey also reintroduces the player to Scramblecoin so they can play it with all the villagers.

Upon reaching the main area of the isle, Jafar reveals that the area is split in two by a rift in time that needs to be fixed before it destroys everything, and he is confined to the palace at the other end. Jafar directs them to recover the Royal Hourglass, a new Royal Tool that will help mend all the damage on Eternity Isle, and anything that appears back in Dreamlight Valley. However, EVE is in possession of the Royal Hourglass and the player must gain her trust before she is willing to return it to them, as not even telling her the player is friends with WALL-E convinces her to hand it over as she was told by the player when they were younger to guard it until further notice. Once the player completes regaining EVE's trust, they get the Royal Hourglass, and after recovering the first of three Jewels of Time to help repair the bridge leading to the rest of the isle, they are granted access to the rest of Eternity Isle, including the biomes where Gaston and Rapunzel were stranded in the Glittering Dunes and the Wild Tangle, and continue to fix all the damage wrought on the isle by Jafar, and what has developed back in Dreamlight Valley as a result of recovering the new Royal Tool.

Once the Royal Hourglass is fully repowered with the three Jewels of Time, the player clears away the time anomalies around the palace, freeing Jafar. Unfortunately, this was what he wanted as he was now free to hunt for the legendary treasure known as the Spark of Imagination. He escapes, for now, while the player prepares to deal with him in the future. Trying to prevent Jafar from getting the Spark of Imagination, the player is able to encounter the legendary Oswald the Lucky Rabbit and help him out. When Jafar does return to use the Spark of Imagination, the player successfully escapes being thrown back into a black-and-white version of Eternity Isle where they encounter Mickey from "Steamboat Willie", and manage to trap Jafar in his genie lamp, stopping his plans. Only later do they agree to let Jafar out in return for helping him try to atone for his villainous actions.

=== The Storybook Vale ===
Receiving a call for help in their mail from a mysterious figure known only as "The Keeper of the Lore", the player travels from the Stardust Port to a new island known as Storybook Vale. Arriving on the island, the player meets up with Merida, who introduces the player to a talking tome known as the Lorekeeper. The Lorekeeper's magic is fading, and it needs the player's help to recover it. With Merida's help, the player recovers another Royal Tool known as the Royal Net, allowing them to catch the magical creatures known as Snippets, that are needed to restore the Lorekeeper's magic. It is also revealed that the loss of the Lorekeeper's magic was due to something she calls the Neverafter, which was created by a conflict between two Disney Villains that lived on Storybook Vale: the Olympian God of the Underworld, Hades, and the Mistress of all Evil herself, Maleficent.

The player travels across Storybook Vale, including the biomes of Everafter and Mythopia. In Everafter, the player discovers Flynn Rider, who was cursed by Maleficent into thinking he was a wolf. After freeing Flynn and recruiting him for help, the player also finds Hades in Mythopia, who only agrees to work things out with Maleficent if he is returned to Mount Olympus. The players learns that in order to reach Mount Olympus and Maleficent's castle, they must complete various Fairy Tale and Mythic Trials across Storybook Vale.

After finally returning Hades to Mount Olympus, as well as meeting Maleficent in her castle, the two villains refuse to reconcile, blaming each other for curses that happened to them before the Neverafter. Realizing that the Neverafter must have been caused by something other than their feuding, the Lorekeeper brings Hades and Maleficent together, and they finally make amends, only for Maleficent to mysteriously vanish afterwards. In order to solve what's really going on, the Lorekeeper realizes the player must find the final missing villager of Storybook Vale; Princess Aurora.

However, shortly after Maleficent's disappearance, the Vale changes: The tapestry behind the Lorekeeper changes, as does the puzzle image on the floor in the center of the Library of Lore. Also, Merida, Hades, and Flynn are starting to disappear, due to apparently being erased. After the player rescues them by recovering their anchor point pages from whirlwinds containing them and some new Dark Snippets, the Lorekeeper explains that Maleficent was sent to the Unwritten Realms to be erased. When the player accesses them via the same puzzle they got the Royal Net from, the Magic Quills inside explain that Maleficent's erasure was authorized by an unknown person who wished to remain anonymous. As the player recovers Maleficent's anchor point pages from the Unwritten Realms to save her, just as they retrieve the third piece, one of the Quills has a message from the Lorekeeper, saying that Maleficent is responsible for what's happening to Storybook Vale and Dreamlight Valley and must be erased. When the player speaks to Maleficent about this, she senses treachery. Once she is fully restored, the player and Maleficent return to the Library of Lore to confront the Lorekeeper on what was learned in the Unwritten Realms from the Quills.

Faced with the player's actions in the Unwritten Realms, the Lorekeeper blames them for causing the Neverafter, saying their presence in Dreamlight Valley is what triggered it, and suggests they leave permanently, but the player argues that there has to be another answer, especially with Aurora's whereabouts still unknown. The player turns to Flynn since he was the last one to see Aurora. Progressing with his friendship quests reveal that he did find Aurora and turned her over to Maleficent, but there's more to it as he would never betray her. It is through further investigating that they soon figure out where Aurora went to protect herself from her hated arch-enemy. It turns out that Aurora entered the world within the tapestry behind the Lorekeeper and is trapped there. When the player follows Aurora's footsteps and completes the trials set before them by Flora, Fauna, and Merryweather's echoes they left behind before going missing, they find her, and learn that the Lorekeeper was behind everything regarding the Neverafter and Aurora was trying to stop it. The Lorekeeper then arrives to confront Aurora and the player, revealing her deception and it being caused by paranoia and fear brought on by the Forgotten when they caused the Forgetting back in Dreamlight Valley, and decides to erase Dreamlight Valley and Storybook Vale in one fell swoop in a blind attempt to keep the stories in her pages safe and unchanged, dragging the player and Aurora into the Unwritten Realms as she unleashes her endgame. Once the player is able confront the Lorekeeper over her actions, the player is able to help the Lorekeeper realize her mistakes due to her misguided beliefs regarding Dreamlight Valley and apologize for them, accepting Dreamlight Valley for all that it is thanks to the player. The player manages to reverse the Lorekeeper's actions and return things to normal, and as the Lorekeeper profusely apologizes to the villagers for her actions and hopes for forgiveness, to show no hard feelings, she changes the tapestry to show the new story that the player rebuilt in her pages, thus ensuring peace and unity again in Storybook Vale. Afterwards, the player sees to providing Aurora a home and welcome her back to the Valley.

=== Wishblossom Ranch ===
Receiving three letters in their mailbox, the player finds two are marked as spam letters, but the third one includes a voucher for a free vacation at a place known as Wishblossom Ranch. Boarding the train provided at the Stardust Port, the player travels to the Wishblossom Mountains to see the ranch, only to find Snow White at the gates, which are sealed off by a blockade from a beehive and swarm of angry bees. It is then that the player finds a Wishblossom, which grants them their own horse to customize and name and ride around for a bit before helping Snow White deal with the bees to get to the ranch proper. Through her, the player learns that Cruella De Vil may be responsible for the condition of Wishblossom Ranch, having duped Snow White into leaving to tend to some helpless animals, and when Snow White returned, Cruella had reduced the ranch to ruins since she couldn't get along with the horses. She argued with Maximus, and then when Khan came to the ranch's defense, Cruella bolted for it in her trademark car as Khan gave chase. Later, upon finding a feather that belongs to Pegasus, the player and Snow White discover that Cruella is seeking the Heart of Wishblossom Mountains. Lore states that if the Pixie Dust magic that keeps the ranch and the Wishblossoms alive is overused and exhausted, the Wishblossoms will wither and die, and the mountains will crumble. Using their new horse to help Snow White, the player clears the way to the Heart of the Wishblossom Mountains, the Giant Wishblossom, and meets up with Tinker Bell upon freeing her from the Giant Wishblossom that she had been imprisoned in by destroying the red crystals choking the Giant Wishblossom's roots and cutting off its Pixie Dust supply to sustain it.

Tink is using every last bit of her own Pixie Dust to keep the Giant Wishblossom alive to prevent the mountains from collapsing and destroying the ranch. With the player's help, they are able to gather enough Pixie Dust that it is able to resuscitate the Giant Wishblossom and, for the moment, stabilize things, but Tink figures that Maximus, Khan, and Pegasus are trapped somewhere within the Giant Wishblossom's roots in the Crystal Caves and the player will need to find the keys necessary to unlock the paths to finding them, rescuing them, and repairing the damage by also saving the other Wishblossoms, which are suffering from the red crystals choking their roots as well, now known as "The Decay", similar to what happened with the Night Thorns back in Dreamlight Valley with The Forgetting. When the player returns to the ranch and tends to their new horse, they end the blizzard that had engulfed the ranch, allowing Scrooge, Goofy, and Remy to arrive to reopen their businesses in the Wishing Alps, where the ranch and local village are located, provide Snow White a new home after her original one was wrecked, and begin clearing the way to reach the other biomes where the other residents of the Wishblossom Mountains reside while rescuing Maximus, Khan, and Pegasus from their imprisonment by the other Wishblossoms because of the Decay Crystals cutting off their Pixie Dust supply.

Upon recovering the first Crystal Key, the player rescues Maximus from the next Wishblossom, who helps get them into the Glamour Gulch, where Cruella is found, having crashed her car in the quarry and is unable to get it out. Helping Cruella allows access to the next Crystal Key to reach the next Wishblossom to rescue Khan, who is able to help reach the last biome in the Pixie Acres, where Tigger is found, having also overused the Pixie Dust like Cruella to cause The Decay in the first place. Helping him is able to grant the last Crystal Key to reach the final Wishblossom and rescue Pegasus from it. After that, the player learns from Tinker Bell that The Decay was their own fault because their heart had become deprived of wishes and needed to be refilled with wishes to save the Wishblossom Mountains from destruction. With Pegasus' help, and that of the villagers in the region, the player is able to empower three young Wishblossoms on the Crystal Islands located in the sky while eliminating the Decay Crystals that would inhibit their growth, and with hope, ambition, and dreams restored, the Wishblossom Ranch and Mountains are saved from imminent destruction with Pixie Dust flowing strong and true through the Wishblossoms again, ending the threat of The Decay for good.

=== Keepsake Sea ===
The next DLC for Dreamlight Valley sees the player reunite with Captain Jack Sparrow, Captain Hook, Wendy Darling, Milo Thatch, and Megara, along with gaining the ability to become merfolk, as they help save and restore the Keepsake Sea as the latest new region of the game.

== Characters ==
Disney Dreamlight Valley features several Disney and Pixar characters who reside in the valley as "villagers":

- Aladdin
  - Aladdin
  - Jasmine
  - Jafar (Note: Via the "A Rift In Time" expansion)
- Alice in Wonderland
  - Alice
  - Cheshire Cat
- Atlantis: The Lost Empire
  - Milo Thatch (Note: Via "The Keepsake Sea" expansion)
- Beauty and the Beast
  - Belle
  - The Beast
  - Cogsworth
  - Lumière
  - Gaston
- Brave
  - Merida (Note: Via "The Storybook Vale" expansion)
- Cinderella
  - Cinderella
  - Fairy Godmother
- Encanto
  - Mirabel
- Frozen
  - Anna
  - Elsa
  - Kristoff
  - Olaf
- Hercules
  - Hercules
  - Megara
  - Phil
  - Hades
- Inside Out
  - Joy
  - Sadness
- Lady and the Tramp
  - Lady
  - Tramp
- Lilo & Stitch
  - Stitch
- Mickey & Friends
  - Mickey Mouse
  - Minnie Mouse
  - Donald Duck
  - Goofy
  - Daisy
  - Scrooge McDuck
- Moana
  - Moana
  - Maui
- Monsters, Inc.
  - Mike Wazowski
  - Sulley
- Mulan
  - Mulan
  - Mushu
- One Hundred and One Dalmatians
  - Cruella de Vil (Note: Via the "Wishblossom Ranch" expansion)
- Oswald the Lucky Rabbit
  - Oswald
- Peter Pan
  - Peter Pan
  - Wendy Darling
  - Tinker Bell
  - Captain Hook
- Pirates of the Caribbean
  - Jack Sparrow
- Pocahontas
  - Pocahontas
- Ratatouille
  - Remy
- Sleeping Beauty
  - Aurora
  - Maleficent
- Snow White and the Seven Dwarfs
  - Snow White
- Tangled
  - Rapunzel
  - Flynn
  - Mother Gothel
- The Lion King
  - Simba
  - Nala
  - Timon
  - Pumbaa
  - Scar
- The Little Mermaid
  - Ariel
  - Prince Eric
  - Ursula
- Tim Burton's The Nightmare Before Christmas
  - Jack Skellington
  - Sally
  - Oogie Boogie
- The Princess and the Frog
  - Tiana
- The Sword in the Stone
  - Merlin
- Toy Story
  - Woody
  - Buzz Lightyear
- WALL-E
  - WALL-E
  - EVE
- Winnie the Pooh
  - Winnie the Pooh (Note: Via the "Honeyglow Woods" adventure pack)
  - Piglet
  - Tigger
  - Eeyore
- Wreck-It Ralph
  - Ralph
  - Vanellope

Several other characters have been announced to be added in later updates:

- Lilo
- Yzma
- Kronk
- Prince Naveen
- Prince Charming
- Carl Fredricksen
- Dug

Additionally, multiple characters appear as unlockable companions (pets) for the player, including Pluto from Mickey & Friends, Figaro, originally from Pinocchio and Minnie Mouse's pet in later media, the Fantasia Broomstick from Fantasia, Lucifer from Cinderella, Dinah from Alice in Wonderland, Nana from Peter Pan, Maleficent's Raven from Sleeping Beauty, Lucky from One Hundred and One Dalmatians, Abigail the Goose and Amelia the Goose from The Aristocats, R2-D2 and BB-8 from Star Wars, Max from The Little Mermaid, The Footstool from Beauty and the Beast, The Magic Carpet and Rajah from Aladdin, Zero from The Nightmare Before Christmas, Meeko and Percy from Pocahontas, Baby Pegasus from Hercules, Mochi from Big Hero 6 and Pua and Heihei from Moana. These companions are typically unlocked as premium purchases, while some of them are unlocked during some quests. The "Wishblossom Ranch" expansion also includes characters as rideable mounts, including Pegasus from Hercules, Khan from Mulan, Maximus from Tangled, and Sven from Frozen. The "Keepsake Sea" expansion also includes characters as adventure companions to help on the player’s quests, including Sebastian and Flounder from The Little Mermaid and Dory from Finding Nemo.

== Development and release ==
Disney Dreamlight Valley was developed by Gameloft Montreal as a life simulation adventure game. Manea Castet, Game Manager of Disney Dreamlight Valley at Gameloft Montreal explained, "Our development team is a big family of Disney and Pixar fans and have poured all of our passion into the development of Disney Dreamlight Valley, especially in the way we depict characters and their story arcs," and continued, "We can't wait for fans to join the Early Access this summer and help us bring this new ever-evolving Disney and Pixar-inspired world to our excited community."

Announced in June 2022, the game was released in early access for Nintendo Switch, PlayStation 4, PlayStation 5, Windows, Xbox One, and Xbox Series X/S on September 6, 2022, while the macOS version released in early access on December 6, 2022, alongside the game's second content update. A physical release for the console versions featuring exclusive content and physical extras, titled the Cozy Edition, was released for Nintendo Switch in North America on October 27, 2023, and will be globally released for Switch, PlayStation platforms, and Xbox platforms on November 10, 2023. The PlayStation and Xbox Cozy Edition releases contain a disc, while the Switch's Cozy Edition is a code-in-a-box release (containing a printed code instead of a Switch Game Card in the box) due to platform limitations.

The game was initially planned to be a free-to-play game after leaving early access. However, in a blog post published in October 2023, Gameloft announced that they had decided to reverse their free-to-play plans, leaving the game as a pay-for title upon full release on December 5, 2023. In the same post, Gameloft also announced that a new expansion titled A Rift in Time will be added on the same day as the full release, which will be included with a new Gold Edition digital release and will be a separate purchase for all other players.

=== Audio ===
The game features the voice acting of Ashley Adler, Tony Anselmo, Tim Allen, Jeff Bennett, Jodi Benson, Danielle Bisutti, Abby Trott, Ben Burtt, Cam Clarke, Chris Sanders, Pat Carroll, Kaitlyn Robrock, Auli'i Cravalho, Enn Reitel, Barbara Dirickson, Patton Oswalt, Bill Farmer, Donna Murphy, Jake Green, Matt Lowe, Jim Hanks, Moira Kelly, Jess Harnell, Bret Iwan, James Horan, Christopher Daniel Barnes, Jonathan Freeman, Richard White, Mandy Moore, Chris Sarandon, Stephanie Beatriz, Carlos Alazraqui, John Goodman, Robby Benson, Susanne Blakeslee, Ruth Connell, Jim Cummings, Anika Noni Rose, David Errigo Jr., Kate Higgins, Elissa Knight, Linda Larkin, Zachary Levi, Tress MacNeille, Julie Nathanson, Catherine O'Hara, Andre Robinson, Isaac Robinson-Smith, Ernie Sabella, Kevin Schon, Laura Silverman, Phyllis Smith, Hynden Walch, Scott Weinger, Ming-Na Wen & James Woods reprising their roles from various Disney films and television series. Dreamlight Valley marks the final appearance of Pat Carroll as Ursula, following her death in 2022 and Catherine O'Hara as Sally, following her death in 2026.

=== Downloadable content and expansions ===
On September 6, 2022, Gameloft released a trailer announcing three "Founder's Packs", which were available during the game's early access period. The Founder's Packs, which were required for early access, included Moonstones (the game's premium currency), wearable items, decorative items, cosmetics animal companions (a "celestial" sea turtle animal companion for Deluxe and Ultimate and a "regal" fox animal companion for Ultimate only), a jersey, and a Mickey Mouse headband (for Deluxe and Ultimate). Additionally, Founder's Pack players received the Gold Edition's exclusive cosmetic items (consisting of a "flowery" capybara companion, a "summer flowery cottage" house style, and wearable artist's overalls for the player) and an additional 2,500 Moonstones.

Dreamlight Valley's first paid expansion, A Rift in Time, was released on December 5, 2023, alongside the full release of the game. It adds a new area called "Eternity Isle" featuring new biomes and new villagers, including EVE, Rapunzel, Gaston, Oswald and Jafar. The Storybook Vale expansion, which launched on November 20, 2024, introduced new characters, including Flynn Rider, Merida, Hades, Maleficent, and Aurora. A third expansion, Wishblossom Ranch, released on November 19, 2025. This expansion also introduced new characters, including Snow White, Cruella de Vil, Tinker Bell, and Tigger, in addition to horses who serve as a mount for the player. A fourth expansion, The Keepsake Sea, launched on November 18, 2026. This expansion also introduced new characters, including Milo Thatch, Jack Sparrow, Megara, Captain Hook and Wendy Darling.

In 2026, the game introduced "adventure packs", smaller paid expansions themed after a single franchise. The first adventure pack, the Winnie the Pooh themed Honeyglow Woods, launched on July 8, 2026. This adventure pack also introduced new characters, including Winnie the Pooh, Eeyore, and Piglet.

== Reception ==
=== Early access ===
Reception
Early access

Review scores
Publication	Score
IGN	8/10
Nintendo Life	7/10
Common Sense Media	5/5

Disney Dreamlight Valley received a positive reception from critics upon its early access release in September 2022.

Ivy Liscomb of Wirecutter complimented Disney Dreamlight Valley for not replicating the Animal Crossing series, appreciating the music, story and gameplay, calling Disney Dreamlight Valley "appealing for both kids and adults alike," and wrote positively about the amount of quests and the customizable content. Travis Northrup of IGN called the game an "awesome life simulator that flexes its iconic characters to riveting, satisfying effect," asserted the story manages to be clever and creative, appreciated the relationships players can forge with the villagers across their different quests, and complimented the customization of the player character and their environment, stating, "Disney Dreamlight Valley feels impressively like a finished product for an early access game." Carrie Lambertsen of Screen Rant said Disney Dreamlight Valley "quickly became one of the most popular of cozy games," found the gameplay to be entertaining and peaceful, saying the ability to farm, gather resources, craft, and decorate make the game enjoyable, and called the player customization pleasant and immersive.

Holly Alice of Pocket Tactics named Disney Dreamlight Valley one of the best life simulation games available on Nintendo Switch and mobile devices. Claire Crossman of Common Sense Media praised the game's depiction of positive messages and role models, saying the game promotes the importance of helping others and encourages creative expression, applauding the diverse representations across the customization of the player character, and appreciating the interactions between the player character and their environment. Swapna Krishna of Wired said Disney Dreamlight Valley succeeds to exceed the limits imposed by the life-simulation genre regarding what players can do through its quests, compared it to the life-simulation indie game Cozy Grove, saying it manages to be the "perfect balance between binge-playing and pacing yourself" owing to the combination of the life-simulation genre and the adventure genre.

Tom Steel of CBR.com compared Disney Dreamlight Valley to Stardew Valley, saying while the game is immersive and nostalgic though Disney properties, it also depicts an "interesting" story and embodies the quality of being a "perfect game for whatever the player's mood requires" like Stardew Valley. Sam Loveridge of GamesRadar+ appreciated the quality-to-life improvements to the game's tools in contrast to Animal Crossing and liked the presence of the Disney characters that lived in the titular Dreamlight Valley, which she said had "some truly brilliant dialogue and narrative flourishes," while saying that certain resources were too scarce. Josh Broadwell of Nintendo Life wrote that he found the game to have "strong worldbuilding", finding its plot to be "an unexpected and even poignant bit of commentary about growing up in general", but believed that the game's Switch optimization was subpar with significant menu lag and game crashes.

Disney Dreamlight Valley earned spots on several year-end best games lists following its early access release. Common Sense Media included the game in its roundup of the "Best Video Games of the Year: 2022", while Esquire featured it in their own list of the year's best games. Dexerto ranked it 8th on its list of the "Best Games of 2022", followed by Vulture at 9th in their "Best Video Games of 2022", and Polygon, which placed it 21st in their "50 Best Video Games of 2022".

=== Post-release ===
Disney Dreamlight Valley received a positive reception from critics upon its full-release in December 2023.

Alexandra O'Leary of Game Rant found Disney Dreamlight Valley to be a "great choice for cozy gamers" who want to experience a calm exploration-based game, said while the game is non-linear, the selection of quests remains substantial, and wrote the world and characters represent "Disney at its most immersive level so far." Christina Alexander of IGN compared the game to the Animal Crossing series, found enjoyable how the player can interact with their inventory, complimented the outfits available to customize the player's avatar, and described the game as one of the best Disney games released on Nintendo Switch.

Jack Brassell of Pocket Gamer gave Disney Dreamlight Valley Arcade Edition a score of 4.5/5 stars and described it as an engaging life simulation experience, appreciated the setting, gameplay, and the cosmetics, saying the game offers the "best aspects" of The Sims franchise to iPhone and iPad devices. Mikhail Madnani of TouchArcade also reviewed the Apple Arcade version of the game and gave it the score of 4/5 stars, calling it one of the "best additions to the service in a long time", found the gameplay to be relaxing, complimented the absence of in-app purchases, and described the expansion "A Rift in Time" as "pretty amazing so far".

Disney Dreamlight Valley earned placements in several curated rankings and end-of-year lists following its full release. In 2024, Game Rant ranked it 2nd among the "Best Disney Games", while TheGamer also placed it 2nd in their list of the "Best Disney Video Games of All Time". It was also included in IGN's roundup of the "Best Video Games of 2024". In 2025, VG247 featured it in their list of the "Best Apple Arcade Games". Pocket Tactics named it one of the "Best iPhone Games for 2025".

=== Sales and revenue ===
On September 6, 2022, Disney Dreamlight Valley topped the Steam sales charts. By September 15, Gameloft announced the game had surpassed one million players ten days after its release. During September, it was the 7th most downloaded game on PlayStation 5 in the United States and Canada, and the 6th in Europe. In October, it was the 19th most downloaded PlayStation 5 title in Europe for the month. In November, Gameloft announced Disney Dreamlight Valley had surpassed 2 million players, including 1 million copies sold, while the game also ranked as the top title on Xbox Game Pass for September. Vivendi revealed Disney Dreamlight Valley, alongside Asphalt Legends Unite, Disney Magic Kingdoms, March of Empires, and Dragon Mania Legends, represented altogether 50% of Gameloft's total revenues, and ranked as one of their five best sellers in 2022.

As of March 2023, Disney Dreamlight Valley had been downloaded over 3 million times, with more than 2 million copies sold and 1 million players on Xbox Game Pass. Gameloft reported that the game contributed significantly to the company's 2022 revenue, which reached €321 million, being a 21% increase compared to the previous year. Of that, just over €50 million came from Disney Dreamlight Valley, accounting for 16% of the total. Six months after its release, the game was still Gameloft's top-performing title. In December, Gameloft revealed that over five million players have played during the early access period of Disney Dreamlight Valley. Later, Steam announced the game was one of the top Early Access titles graduates by gross revenue on the platform in 2023. Vivendi said Disney Dreamlight Valley, with Asphalt Legends Unite, Disney Magic Kingdoms, March of Empires, and Dragon Mania Legends, represented altogether 56% of Gameloft's total revenues, and ranked as one of their five best sellers in 2023.

In March 2025, Vivendi stated the second expansion of Disney Dreamlight Valley was a "success." Together with Asphalt Legends Unite, Disney Magic Kingdoms, March of Empires, and Disney Speedstorm, the game contributed to a group that accounted for 57% of Gameloft's total revenues, placing them among the company's top five best-sellers for the year of 2024. In the first half of 2025, these five titles, Disney Dreamlight Valley, Asphalt Legends Unite, Disney Magic Kingdoms, March of Empires, and Disney Speedstorm, continued to be Gameloft's top-performing games, generating 57% of the company's total revenue. Vivendi reported improved revenues for Gameloft compared to the same period in 2024, citing Disney Dreamlight Valley as delivering a "strong performance."

At the end of June 2025, Gameloft CEO Alexandre De Rochefort announced that Disney Dreamlight Valley had become the biggest success for Gameloft Montreal and even Gameloft, generating over $300 million since its release. A third expansion for the game was released in November 2025.

=== Accolades ===
Year	Award	Category	Result	Ref
2022	Golden Joystick Awards	Best Early Access Launch	Nominated	
2022	NAVGTR Awards	Outstanding Game - Simulation	Nominated	
2022	Shacknews Awards	Best Early Access Game of 2022	Won	
2022	PC Gamer's Game of the Year Awards	Best Early Access	Won	
2022	Pocket Tactics Awards	Nintendo Switch Game of the Year	Won	
2023	Steam Awards	Sit Back and Relax	Nominated	
2023	D.I.C.E. Awards	Family Game of the Year	Nominated	
2023	British Academy Games Awards	Family	Nominated	
2023	Gayming Awards	Gayming Magazine Readers' Award	Nominated	
2023	Pocket Tactics Awards	Mobile Game of the Year	Won	
2023	Pocket Tactics Awards	Indie Game of the Year	Won	
2023	Webby Awards	People's Voice - Best Game Design	Won	
