= Warhammer 40,000: Eternal Crusade =

2016 video game

- Developer: Behaviour Interactive
- Publisher: Behaviour Interactive
- Composer: Maxime Goulet
- Series: Warhammer 40,000
- Engine: Unreal Engine 4
- Platform: Microsoft Windows
- Release: September 23, 2016
- Genre: Third-person shooter
- Mode: Multiplayer

Warhammer 40,000: Eternal Crusade was a science fiction online third-person shooter video game based on the Warhammer 40,000 universe. The game was released on September 23, 2016 for Microsoft Windows. As of January 2016 it was planned to release the game for PlayStation 4 and Xbox One on a later date, but the ports were later canceled.

== Gameplay ==
The game is a player versus player online multiplayer action shooter, with gameplay taking place on the planet of Arkhona.

=== Races and factions ===
- Space Marines: (Ultramarines, Space Wolves, Imperial Fists, Dark Angels, Blood Angels, Legion of the Damned)
- Chaos Space Marines: (Alpha Legion, Black Legion, Night Lords, Word Bearers, Iron Warriors)
- Orks: (Goffs, Evil Sunz, Deathskulls, Blood Axes, Bad Moons)
- Eldar: (Altansar, Biel-Tan, Iyanden, Saim-Hann, Ulthwé)

The game features several races for players to choose from. Each race has its own variety of classes that are unique and recognizable to fans of the Warhammer 40,000 universe. In addition, all factions have "Elite-classes" that must be bought with in-game resources before being able to play them. The playable races include: Orks, Space Marines, Eldar, and Chaos Space Marines. The Tyranids are present in game as NPCs, being the primary enemies in the game's procedurally-created dungeons "Under worlds" and survival "Hives" game modes to provide a Player Versus Environment experience. As of Alpha, the plan was, according to the developers, to add various other races from the universe, such as the Tau and Dark Eldar, "over the game's lifetime".

== Development ==
=== Founders program ===
Behaviour Interactive launched the founder program for Eternal Crusade on June 25, 2014. Similar to a pre-order program, people can buy packs before the game release, allowing them to get the full game key, and several bonuses, like in-game currency, unique items, etc.

=== Closed Alpha ===
The development team released the closed Alpha on September 14, 2015 to its founders. The objective of the closed Alpha was to test the shooter part of the game, before releasing all the persistence and progression features.

=== Release ===
During the closed Alpha period, the game was available on Microsoft Windows platforms. The game is no longer available via Steam. The game is available for free, however, in this version players can only play 18 out of the 22 basic classes and experience-points are earned at a lower rate. Paying players who purchase a copy of the full game will be able to play as all classes from all factions and earn experience-points at the full rate.

=== End of the game ===
On June 10, 2021, the developers announced the upcoming permanent shutdown of the game servers, scheduled for September 10, 2021.

=== Post Server Close ===
There are attempts at bringing the game back to life privately being made as several private projects but as of August 2023 the game remains mostly unplayable and the official servers are down.

== Reception ==
Reception

Aggregate score
Aggregator	Score
Metacritic	52/100

Review scores
Publication	Score
IGN	5.3/10
The Games Machine (Italy)	7.1/10

Warhammer 40,000: Eternal Crusade received "mixed or average" reviews according to review aggregator Metacritic.
