= Dragon Mania Legends =

2015 video game

- Developer: Gameloft Budapest
- Publisher: Gameloft
- Composer: Carl Vaudrin
- Engine: Proprietary
- Platforms: Windows Phone, Microsoft Windows, iOS, Android
- Release: January 8, 2015
- Genre: Casual
- Mode: Single-player

Dragon Mania Legends is a 2015 casual mobile game developed and published by Gameloft. It is a sequel to the game Dragon Mania, released a year and a half prior in November 2013. It was released on January 8, 2015 for iOS and Android. It was later released for Windows Phone and Microsoft Windows.

A short-lived version for tvOS was released in December 2015, but was discontinued in May 2016 after the game's 2.1 update and is no longer playable on Apple TV devices.

In 2026, Gameloft announced that the game had surpassed 222 million downloads, and still had more than 7 million active players 11 years after its release.

== Gameplay ==
The game takes place in a fictional world called Dragolandia, and it features Vikings. The game opens with the ability for the player to build dragon habitats on one island, with others available for purchase through in-game currency. Currency in-game is coins and the premium currency is gems. The game does include in-app purchases and bonus promotion videos.

There are many dragons, each one with an affiliated element or elements. Players begin Dragon Mania Legends with one dragon, a level 1 Fire dragon, but can recruit more dragons through leveling up, completing quests and events, obtaining card packs, purchasing them, or breeding them. Players can upgrade their dragons by feeding them, obtaining dragon food on farms, and as rewards. Feed production, breeding, and other tasks take time to complete, but players can speed up processes by spending premium currency.

Players spend energy to enter turn-based battles on a campaign map with battles seeing players drag a dragon's element on top of an enemy to attack. This begins a meter, and players are challenged with tapping when the meter is in either the gray (normal attack) or green (perfect attack) areas. If players stop the meter in the red area, their attack misses.

Battles continue until all enemy units have been defeated, and players earn rewards like experience points and dragon food after each victory. Players can spend premium currency on a VIP upgrade to unlock additional rewards after these battles. VIPs also can complete more battles before waiting for their energy to recharge and can participate in VIP-only events. VIP accounts aren't permanent, but rather last for a limited amount of time, about their cost.

In addition to the game's single-player story mode, gamers can enter the Arena to face off against other players for exclusive rewards.

There are 6 structures named ruins on the various islands that can be purchased and explored; The Mystic Cave, Ghost Ship, Wildfire Marsh, Skull Gate, Ancient's Palace, and Magma's Lair. These structures can be purchased with in-game currency. Each structure gives the player rewards and seals through exploring. When the player explores, each ruin offers three shards that makeup one seal. After forging the seal, it gives the player a brief speed-up of in-game timers. After unlocking each of the six seals, a dragon called Chronos appears on top of the Mystic Cave, giving the player the ability to speed up timers.

== New Dragon Mania game ==
In 2026, Gameloft announced on websites that it is preparing a new Dragon Mania game for 2027, titled Dragon Mania Skyhaven. The studio has removed the game's name from its website but is actively continuing recruitment for the game.According to the first available information, it will be an open-world game where players can create their own village to take care of dragons. Players will notably be able to fly on the backs of dragons to explore the world. The game is planned for release on PC and consoles, while a mobile version has neither been confirmed nor ruled out for now. It is also worth noting that updates for Dragon Mania Legends have not slowed down, as the two games are being developed by separate teams.
