= Gameloft =

French video game company

Gameloft SE
- Logo used since 2010
- Formerly: Game Loft/GameLoft.com (1999-2001)
- Type: Subsidiary
- Traded as: Euronext Paris: GLFT
- Industry: Video games
- Founded: 14 December 1999; 26 years ago
- Founder: Michel Guillemot
- Headquarters: Paris, France
- Area served: Worldwide
- Key people: Alexandre de Rochefort (CEO)
- Revenue: ▲€303 million (2025)
- Number of employees: 2,366 (2025)
- Parent: Vivendi (2016–present)
- Subsidiaries: Gameloft Montreal; Gameloft Barcelona; Gameloft Bucharest; Gameloft Brisbane; Gameloft Ukraine; Gameloft Hanoï; Gameloft Saigon; Gameloft Yogyakarta; Gameloft Sofia; Gameloft Paris
- Website: www.gameloft.com

Gameloft SE is a French video game company based in Paris, founded in December 1999 by Ubisoft co-founder Michel Guillemot. The company operates 10 development studios worldwide, and publishes games for mobile devices, video game consoles, and PC. The group is known for numerous successful video games and franchises on mobile and, in recent years, on PC and consoles, from Asphalt to Disney Dreamlight Valley. Formerly a public company traded at the Paris Bourse, Gameloft was acquired by French investment company Vivendi in 2016. The group successfully diversified into PC and console games in addition to the mobile market starting in 2022.

== History ==
=== Game development strategy ===
Gameloft was founded by Michel Guillemot, one of the five founders of Ubisoft, on 14 December 1999. Gameloft's first game was Valdo and the Pirates. By February 2009, Gameloft had shipped over 200 million copies of its games since its IPO, as well as 2 million daily downloads of its games via the App Store for iOS.

Gameloft quickly became the world leader in mobile video games (and would remain so until the mid-2010s). Between 2003 and 2006, Gameloft experienced significant growth, with annual revenue increasing by more than 100%. Its workforce grew from 100 to 2,400 employees in just 3 years. In 2005, it was ranked as the fourth fastest-growing European company.

In 2004, Gameloft Montreal launched the first installment of the Asphalt franchise: Asphalt Urban GT. The game, a paid title, was a considerable success for the emerging mobile market, selling over 5 million copies.

In 2006, Gameloft drew inspiration from the gameplay of GTA-style games to launch its own open-world action franchise on mobile: Gangstar, with Gangstar: Crime City as the first installment. The game adapted this type of experience, very popular on consoles, to the significant technical limitations of mobile phones at the time. The series quickly became one of the studio's major franchises, with very noticeable technical leaps between entries, much like the Asphalt series, driven by the rapid advancement of smartphone capabilities from the early 2000s to today, an evolution that is far faster than that of consoles, which already start from a higher baseline but progress at a slower pace, and which Gameloft will be one of the main groups, and at first the only one, to make maximum use of the technical potential of 2000s and 2010s phones, in particular with Asphalt and Gangstar.

In 2009, Gameloft released, among others, Asphalt 5, which achieved widespread success with over 20 million downloads, as well as its first games in its franchises Dungeon Hunter, N.O.V.A., Modern Combat; Dungeon Hunter and Modern Combat will be primarily developed by Gameloft Montreal, and N.O.V.A. by Gameloft Bucharest, with the first 3 of these series being 2009 releases.

Gameloft's breakthrough game for mobile platforms was Order & Chaos Online, released in April 2011.

In a May 2011 keynote, de Rochefort stated that he wanted to avoid moving the company to the NASDAQ stock exchange, as the U.S. games market appeared to be nothing more than a large economic bubble, especially when seeing Zynga's then US$10 billion total stock value.

Several Gameloft's games from early 2010s have often been accused of being clones of other properties; when asked about it at the November 2011 Consumer Electronics Show, chief executive officer (CEO) Michel Guillemot stated: "The videogame industry has always played around a limited number of themes. There is maybe one new idea a year." In response to many users commenting on Guillemot's remarks, Levi Buchanan of IGN defended Gameloft, stating that its games were usually well-polished, in contrary to the original concepts' games.

During the first fiscal quarter of 2012, Gameloft recorded a 59% increase in sales of its games on smartphones and tablets compared to the same period in 2011, thanks in particular to the release of Asphalt 7: Heat, The Dark Knight Rises, Zombiewood, Modern Combat 4 : Zero Hour, and The Amazing Spider-Man (2014).

In 2013, the company achieved three major successes. Despicable Me: Minion Rush, developed by Gameloft Barcelona, has been downloaded over 1 billion times since its release, making it one of the most successful mobile games of all time, as well as Asphalt 8: Airborne, also developed by Gameloft Barcelona, which became the highest-rated game ever created in Spain. At the same time, Gangstar Vegas, an open-world game developed by Gameloft Montreal, has accumulated more than 200 million downloads.. Additionally, N.O.V.A. 3, a major paid title with no microtransactions from Gameloft Bucharest, also achieved significant success and received very positive reviews from the press.

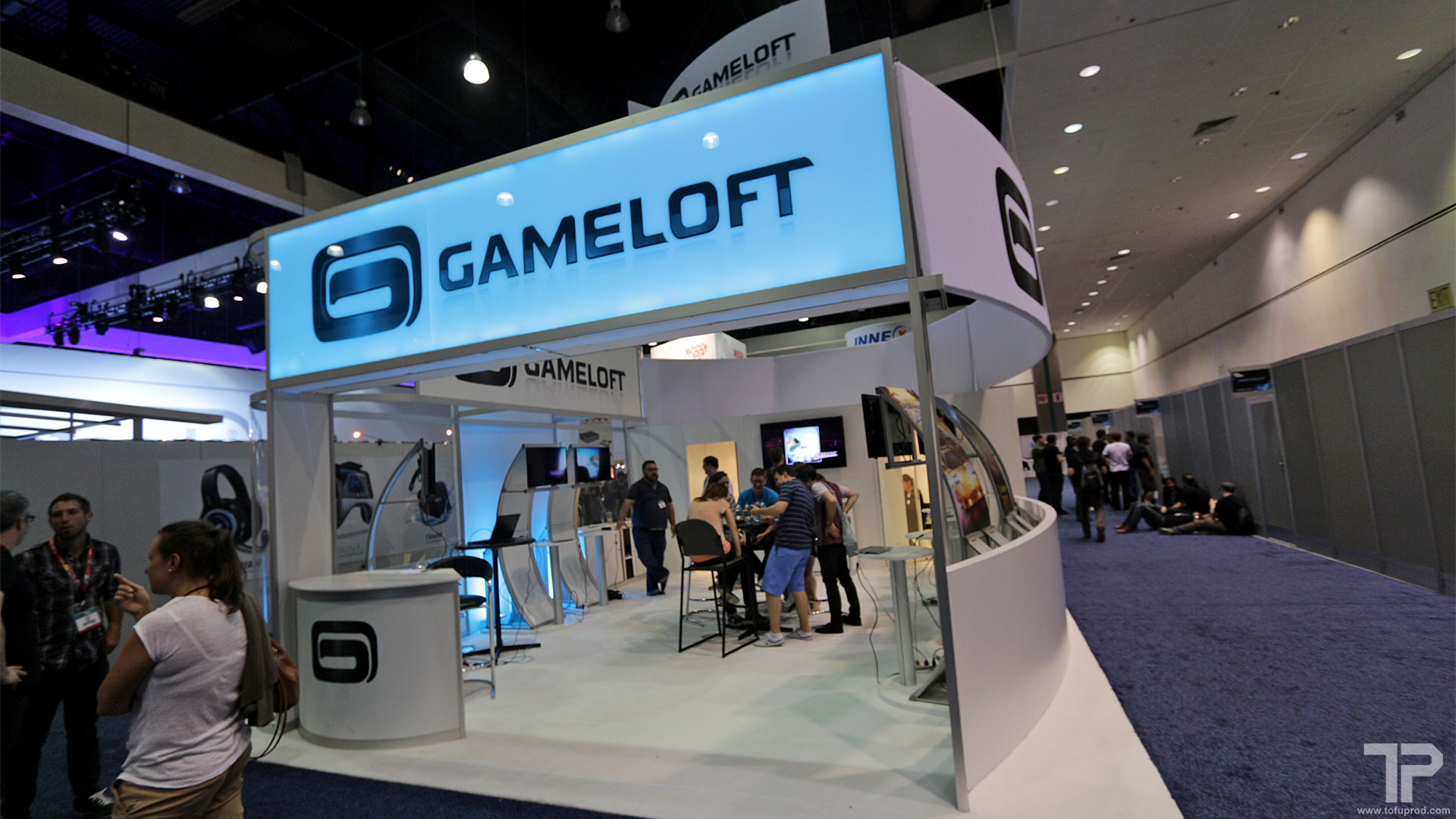
Gameloft booth at the E3 2014

By July 2014, Gameloft announced that it would focus more strongly on quality than on quantity.

In April 2013, Texan company Lodsys filed a lawsuit against Gameloft, among other mobile game developers, for infringing its patent on in-app purchases. Similar lawsuits were previously intervened by Apple Inc., who claim to have licensed the technology from Lodsys for usage in its App Store. Lodsys withdrew its lawsuit against Gameloft after losing similar cases against other groups.

In February 2012 and February 2016, Gameloft penned publishing contracts with GREE, Inc. s.d GungHo Online Entertainment, respectively, to facilitate its presence in the Asian market.

From end 2014 to 2022, Gameloft experienced a significant period of difficulty, despite some successes (Dungeon Hunter 5, Modern Combat 5, March of Empires, Dragon Mania Legends, Asphalt 9 Legends), primarily due to extremely strong competition and an increasingly saturated mobile gaming market. During this period (and particularly between 2015 and 2019), Gameloft closed several studios and reduced staff at many others. Gameloft's total number of employees has almost halved over these 8 years, dropping from over 5 000 to less than 3 000. Although there were some exceptions such as Gameloft Barcelona, which continued to grow thanks to its Asphalt games, and for example also Gameloft Montreal, which remained stable and will allow Gameloft to recover in 2022 thanks largely to Disney Dreamlight Valley.

=== Vivendi subsidiary ===
In October 2015, French media conglomerate Vivendi announced that it had acquired a 6.2% stake in Gameloft's stock, which was quickly raised to 10.2% a few days later. By February 2016, Vivendi had acquired 30% in the company, and launched a hostile takeover bid. In accordance with French law, Vivendi started a tender offer to acquire further shares.

Following the announcement, Gameloft's board of directors strongly advised shareholders against selling stock to Vivendi to avoid the hostile takeover. By May 2016, Vivendi had won over the majority of shareholders, enabling it to move forward in the takeover.

The acquisition was completed on 1 June 2016, with Vivendi having acquired 56%, an absolute majority over Gameloft's ownership. Employees of Gameloft were presented with an open letter welcoming them to the new parent company's family.

Analysts believed that the takeover was just the first step towards also purchasing Ubisoft, another video game venture founded by Guillemot and his brothers, although Vivendi only held a 17.7% minority in that company at the time. In response to Vivendi's actions, Guillemot announced that he would step down from his company and join his brother Yves Guillemot at Ubisoft to prevent it from also being taken over. Guillemot later clarified that his stepping-down would take effect on 29 June.

On 8 June, the Guillemot brothers announced that they were regretfully selling their ownership in Gameloft to Vivendi. The transaction awarded Vivendi another 21.7% in Gameloft's capital. After Guillemot departed from Gameloft on 29 June, Vivendi set up a new board of directors for the company, with Vivendi's present chief operating officer (COO), Stéphane Roussel, appointed Gameloft's chairman and CEO, and Gameloft's previous CFO, de Rochefort, additionally taking over the management of the company's 39 subsidiaries. At that point, Vivendi owned 95.94% of Gameloft's share capital.

In 2018, Gameloft Barcelona released Asphalt 9: Legends on mobile devices. The game achieved notable success and was later ported in 2019 to the Nintendo Switch and in 2022 to Steam, where it also found success on both new platforms.

=== Major boost due to the transition to PC and console games ===
On 6 September 2022, Gameloft launched the early access version of Disney Dreamlight Valley on PC and consoles. The title marked a strategic shift for the group, which aimed to diversify its business beyond mobile gaming into the PC and console markets. Disney Dreamlight Valley significantly exceeded commercial expectations, with Gameloft's revenue for the July–September 2022 period rose by 48% compared to the same period the previous year. Following this success, Gameloft announced it would continue focusing on the PC and console gaming markets, relegating mobile game development to a secondary priority.

On a smaller scale, 2022 was marked by the success of another Gameloft game on PC and consoles: The Oregon Trail (originally released in 2021 on Apple Arcade, then in 2022 on PC and consoles), which met with critical and commercial success. Developed by Gameloft Brisbane, the game enabled this small Gameloft studio to double its workforce, growing from 50 to over 100 employees. Since then, Gameloft Brisbane has focused on developing PC and console games without microtransactions.

Gameloft Montreal, the studio responsible for Disney Dreamlight Valley, announced in 2024 the development of a new Dungeons & Dragons title, without giving a release date or name to the project. In the same year, Gameloft Barcelona released Asphalt Legends on PlayStation, while Gameloft Brisbane launched a Carmen Sandiego game in 2025 for PC and consoles, and it is also preparing the release of Bluey's Happy Snaps, another game exclusive to PC and consoles, with a launch scheduled for autumn 2026. Gameloft Bucharest and Gameloft Paris are currently recruiting staff for unannounced open world and sports games for PC and console platforms. These projects mark the company's transition towards a primary focus on PC and console development.

In the summer of 2025, Gameloft announced that Disney Dreamlight Valley, developed by Gameloft Montreal, had become the company's biggest success ever, generating over 300 million dollars. A third paid expansion was released in November. The same year, on the occasion of the franchise's 20th anniversary, Gameloft announced that the Asphalt games have surpassed 1.5 billion downloads and confirmed its intention to keep this historic franchise active in the years to come.

In 2026, Gameloft Barcelona (developer of Disney Speedstorm and recent Asphalt titles) began recruiting for a new AAA premium PC and console game while continuing to support Asphalt Legends. The same year, Gameloft Bucharest revealed that its upcoming cozy open-world game, Dragon Mania Skyhaven, is scheduled for 2027. Set in the Dragon Mania franchise, it will feature village-building, dragon riding, and open-world exploration. In April 2026, Gameloft announced that its Dungeons & Dragons game, developed by Gameloft Montreal, was targeting a September 2027 release for early access. Aside from a concept artwork unveiled in 2024, no gameplay had been shown. CEO Alexandre de Rochefort described it as "the most ambitious and innovative project in Gameloft's history". Also in 2026, Gameloft Brisbane released Bluey's Happy Snaps, a premium game featuring no microtransactions and no mandatory internet connection.

== Corporate affairs ==
Gameloft is headquartered in the 9th arrondissement of Paris and operates 10 game development studios worldwide. It employs 2,366 people as of December 2025.

=== Studios ===
In addition to the head office in Paris, the group's oldest locations still in operation are Gameloft Montreal, Gameloft Barcelona and Gameloft Bucharest, all created in 2000.

Growth and openness (2000–2014)

Gameloft opened more than 20 studios in total between 2000 and 2010. The group is multiplying its openings, at the same pace as its spectacular growth, with some years seeing an increase in turnover of more than 70% at once (with a peak increase of over 120% in 2004).

In July 2011, Glenn Watson, lead programmer of Gameloft's Auckland offshoot, stated that the company's management created a "constant sense of urgency" at its studio, having employees regularly work 12- to 14-hour days. A new studio in New Orleans was opened in August 2011, taking advantage of tax breaks granted by the government of Louisiana in July 2009 to establish 150 new jobs.

On 29 January 2013, Gameloft's India studio in Hyderabad was closed midway through the workday, leaving 250 people unemployed.

In 2014, Gameloft Brisbane, a new studio of the group, opened its doors in Australia, and was the last studio created before the financial crisis (which will lead to layoffs and closures) that mainly took place between 2015 and 2019.

Crisis and layoffs (2015–2019)

Between June and August 2015, Gameloft's Tokyo location laid off roughly 80 people, effectively closing the studio. The Gameloft group, facing significant financial difficulties during this period with losses of several million each quarter, announces plans for further closures to stabilize the group.

On 8 July 2015, all operations at the company's New York City office were halted, and as many as 100 employees were laid off. Shortly after, in September 2015, Gameloft's Seattle studio was closed down and its 15 employees were let go. The studio was opened just a year prior to its closure. Seven studios were closed in total in 2015, including two important studios in the group, Gameloft Chengdu with more than 200 employees, and the relatively small but which was one of the oldest studios in the group : Gameloft New York (developer of Zombiewood, among other things). Guillemot stated that these actions were taken to accommodate its "ambitious cost reduction program", instantiated after the company saw a net loss of €16.6 million in the fiscal year that ended on 30 June 2015.

In January 2016, Gameloft opened a Nigerian marketing office for regional expansions (but which closed shortly afterwards), and shut down its Auckland studio, firing roughly 160 employees. At the time, Gameloft Auckland was New Zealand's largest video game studio. Gameloft's Valencia, Spain, location was shuttered in April 2016. In July 2017, Gameloft appointed John-Paul Burke as country manager for its subsidiaries in the United Kingdom and Ireland. Gameloft UK later closed in December 2019. At the same time, Gameloft Madrid (40 employees) is closed due to the underperformance of its games, at the same time, the group's other Spanish studio, Gameloft Barcelona (which had over 150 employees at that time) continues to recruit for its upcoming game Asphalt 9 : Legends. Gameloft Budapest (founded 2012) was closed in March 2023.

In total, nearly half of Gameloft's studios closed between 2015 and 2019, the group continued to lose hundreds of thousands to several million euros each quarter during those years. Gameloft then remained financially unstable until 2022, when the group returned to regular profits.

End of crisis and stability

In 2022, Gameloft opened a studio near its headquarters in Paris (France), focusing on PC and console game. At the same time, the Gameloft Brisbane studio is entering a phase of massive recruitment following the success of The Oregon Trail, Gameloft Montreal studio is also strengthening its teams following the huge success of Disney Dreamlight Valley.

On 22 February 2024, Gameloft cut 38 jobs from its Lviv office in Ukraine (following a cancelled project) and an unknown number of employees from its Toronto office.Gameloft Kharkiv and Gameloft Lviv merged to become Gameloft Ukraine. On 10 July 2024, the Cluj office was closed and its 136 employees were laid off. The same year, the Gameloft Montreal studio announced that it was recruiting for a future Dungeons & Dragons PC and console game. Between 2024 and 2025, Gameloft Brisbane doubled its workforce, surpassing 130 employees.

In 2025 and over the current year, there were no layoffs and all of Gameloft's studios recruited, particularly Gameloft Montreal, Gameloft Bucharest, Gameloft Paris, Gameloft Brisbane, and Gameloft Barcelona.

List of studios
| Name | Location | Founded/acquired | Ref. |
|---|---|---|---|
| Gameloft Barcelona | Barcelona, Spain | 2000 | |
| Gameloft Bucharest | Bucharest, Romania | 2000 | |
| Gameloft Montreal | Montreal, Canada | 2000 | |
| Gameloft Brisbane | Brisbane, Australia | 2014 | |
| Gameloft Kharkiv / Gameloft Ukraine | Kharkiv, Ukraine | 2007 | |
| Gameloft Lviv/Gameloft Ukraine | Lviv, Ukraine | 2014 | |
| Gameloft South-East Asia | Ho Chi Minh City, Vietnam; Hanoi, Vietnam; Yogyakarta, Indonesia | 2004 | |
| Gameloft Sofia | Sofia, Bulgaria | 2005 | |
| Gameloft Paris (studio) | Paris, France | 2022 | |
| FreshPlanet | New York City, United States | 2018 | |
| The Other Guys | Buenos Aires, Argentina | 2020 | |

=== Services ===
In October 2019, Gameloft announced a partnership with mobile operator Gruppo TIM to open TIM I Love Games, a games subscription service for Android and iOS, exclusive to Italy and TIM customers.
