= Asphalt: Injection =

2011 video game

- North American box art featuring Lamborghini Aventador
- Developer: Gameloft
- Publishers: JP: Konami; WW: Ubisoft
- Series: Asphalt
- Platforms: PlayStation Vita, Android
- Release: JP: December 17, 2011; NA: February 15, 2012; EU: February 22, 2012; AU: February 23, 2012
- Genre: Racing
- Modes: Single player, multiplayer

Asphalt: Injection is a racing game developed by Gameloft for the PlayStation Vita and Android and released in 2011–2012. It was the eighth major game in the Asphalt series. Like Asphalt 3D, it was published by Konami in Japan and Ubisoft in the rest of the world.

== Gameplay ==
The game contains three main gameplay modes. The "Career" mode allows the player to unlock tracks, cars and upgrades. In "Free Play", the player can play with previously unlocked tracks and vehicles. The "Multiplayer" mode gives the player the ability to play against others online. The game includes 52 licensed cars, 20 career classes and 15 race tracks from the Android version of Asphalt 6: Adrenaline, similar to Asphalt 3D which has 17 tracks from the Android version of Asphalt 5. The Android version was released exclusively for Lenovo K860, which had two exclusive cars, each of which closely resembled the Audi R8 and the Ferrari Enzo.

== Reception ==
Reception

Aggregate score
Aggregator	Score
Metacritic	49/100

Review scores
Publication	Score
4Players	62%
Destructoid	5/10
Electronic Gaming Monthly	3/10
Famitsu	28/40
GameRevolution	4/10
GamesMaster	63%
Hyper	5/10
IGN	6/10
Jeuxvideo.com	9/20
Pocket Gamer	1.5/5
PlayStation: The Official Magazine	5/10

The game received "generally unfavorable reviews" according to the review aggregation website Metacritic. In Japan, Famitsu gave it a score of all four sevens for a total of 28 out of 40.
