= KTM X-Bow =

Ultra-light sports car

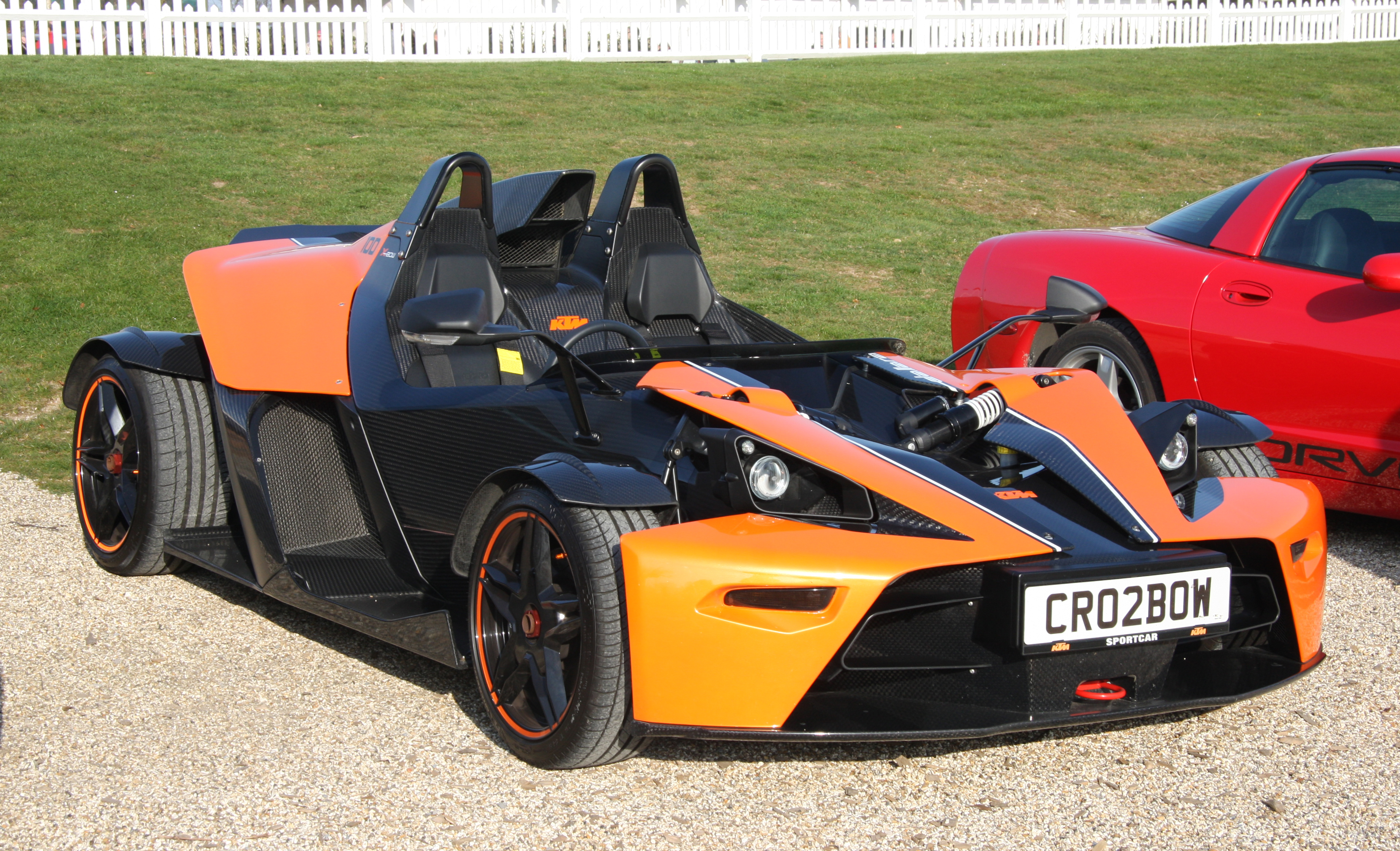

Overview
- Manufacturer: KTM
- Production: 2008–present
- Model years: 2009–present
- Assembly: Graz, Austria (KTM Sportcar GmbH)
- Designer: KISKA GmbH

Body and chassis
- Class: Track day car Sports car (S)
- Body style: Open two-seater speedster
- Layout: Rear mid-engine, rear-wheel drive
- Doors: Open cockpit (R, RR, GT); Canopy (GTX, GT-XR, GT4, GT2)

Powertrain
- Engine: 2.0 L Audi turbo I4 (R, RR, GT, GT4); 2.5 L Audi TFSI I5 (GTX, GT-XR, GT2)
- Transmission: 6-speed manual 6-speed Holinger sequential gearbox

Dimensions
- Wheelbase: 2,430 mm (95.7 in)
- Length: 3,738 mm (147.2 in)
- Width: 1,915 mm (75.4 in)
- Height: 1,202 mm (47.3 in)
- Kerb weight: 790 kg (1,740 lb); 810 kg (1,790 lb) (RR); 847 kg (1,867 lb) (GT); 1,048 kg (2,310 lb) (GTX); 1,250 kg (2,760 lb) (GT-XR)

KTM X-Bow

The KTM X-Bow (pronounced crossbow) is an ultra-light sports car manufactured by Austrian automotive manufacturer KTM, a company known for their production of motorcycles. The X-Bow was the first mass-produced car in their product range and was unveiled and launched at the Geneva Motor Show in 2008. The X-Bow road car was developed in collaboration with KISKA GmbH, Audi, and Dallara.

== Specifications ==
KTM developed its X-Bow road cars in collaboration with design studio KISKA GmbH, Audi, and Dallara. It uses a carbon fiber monocoque.

The X-Bow uses a 2.0-litre transversely-mounted turbocharged inline-4 engine from Audi that produced 237 hp (177 kW; 240 PS) at 5,500 rpm and 230 lb⋅ft (310 N⋅m) of torque between 2,000 and 5,500 rpm. In the X-Bow R model for 2011 and for other models onwards, the Audi inline-4 is further tuned to produce 300 hp (224 kW; 304 PS) and 400 N⋅m (295 lbf⋅ft) of torque at 3,300 rpm. Two transmission options were available for the X-Bow; a 6-speed manual or a 6-speed Holinger twin-clutch DSG sequential manual. The front tyres are 205/45 ZR17 and the rear tyres are 235/40 ZR18. The X-Bow features Brembo brakes with 305 mm (12.0 in) diameter discs at the front and 262 mm (10.3 in) diameter discs at the rear. The X-Bow was capable of accelerating from 0-62 mph (100 km/h) in 3.9 seconds. Its top speed is 217 km/h (134.9 mph). For the GTX, GT2 Concept, and GT-XR models, the X-Bow uses a 2.5-litre Audi TFSI 20-valve I5 engine sourced from the Audi RS3.

Originally, KTM planned a production of 500 units per year; however, the company increased production to 1,000 cars a year and built a new plant near Graz due to high demand.

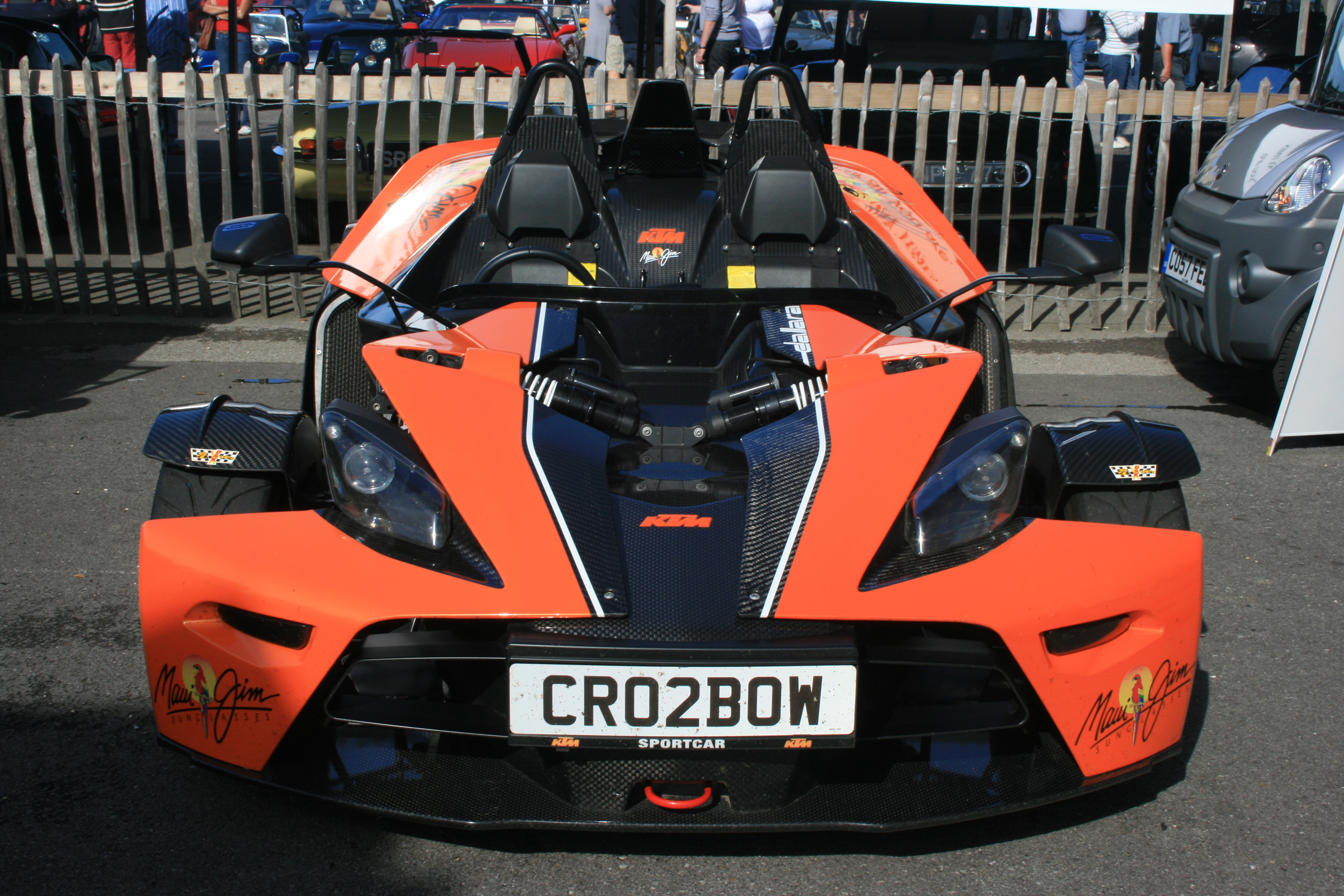
Front view of the X-Bow.

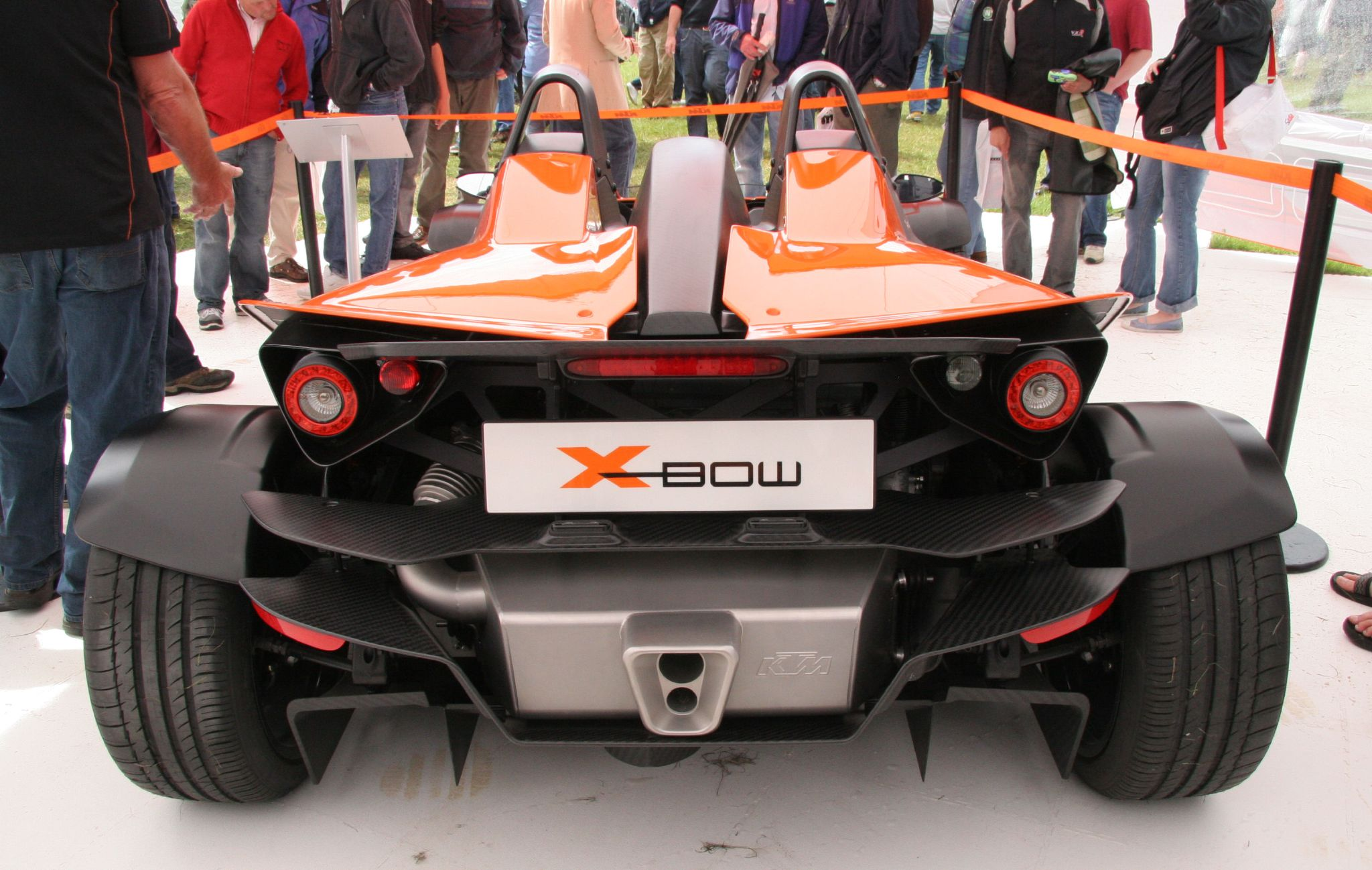
Rear view of the X-Bow.

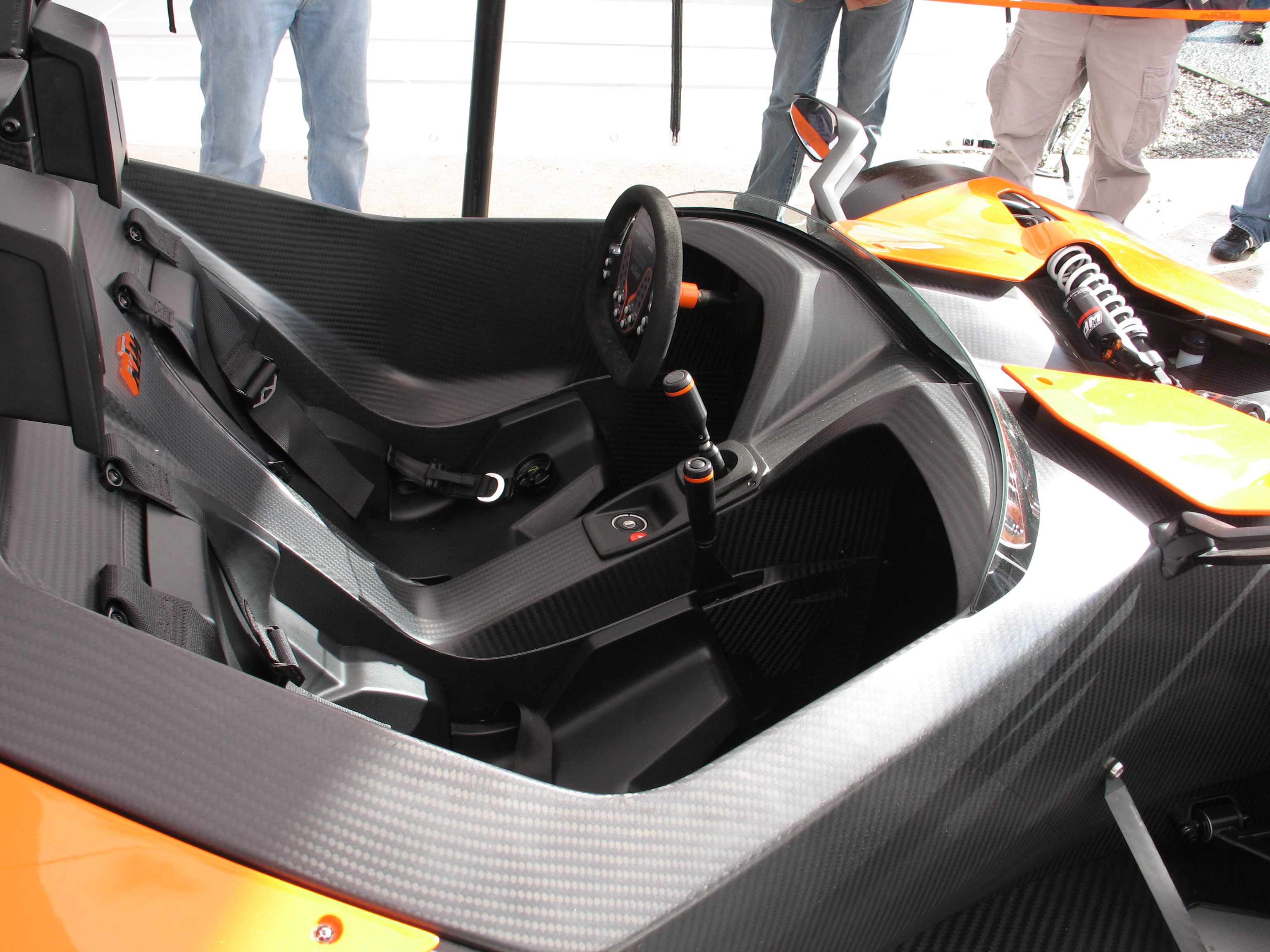
Interior of the X-Bow.

== Models ==
The first iteration of the KTM X-Bow was unveiled at the 2008 Geneva Motor Show. There have since been a number of models made available since the X-Bow's release.

=== X-Bow R ===
The X-Bow R is an updated version of the original X-Bow. The car's Audi inline-4 is more powerful than the older X-Bow it replaces, tuned to produce 300 hp (224 kW; 304 PS) and 295 lb⋅ft (400 N⋅m). The X-Bow R was later made available for the United States market in 2019, and it was released as the KTM X-Bow Comp R. However, unlike the standard X-Bow, the Comp R is not street-legal and is exclusively a track-only car.

=== X-Bow RR ===
The X-Bow RR is a high-performance version of the X-Bow.

=== X-Bow GT ===
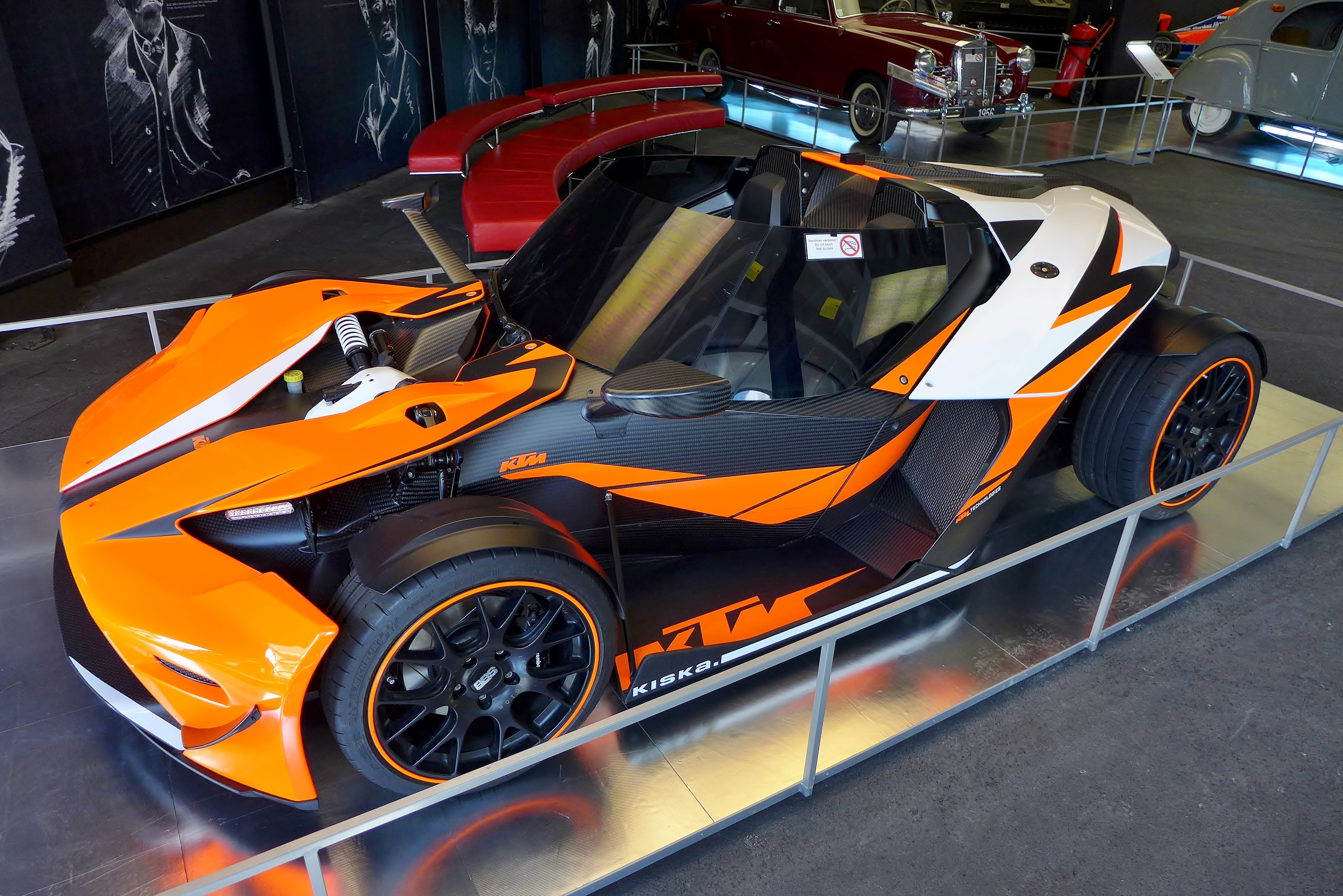
The X-Bow GT on display.

The X-Bow GT is a slightly more refined version of the X-Bow. The car contains a windscreen and side windows for the driver and passenger. The car has the same power output as the standard model and uses a 6-speed manual. The weight is slightly heavier at 847 kg (1,867 lb) due to the addition of the windscreen and windows, resulting in a slightly slower 0–60 mph (0–97 km/h) time of 4.1 seconds, as well as a different weight distribution ratio of 38:62. The ride height is 10 mm higher. The car's aerodynamics have also been decreased. The X-Bow GT provides luggage with 50 litres of capacity, and its center console has been changed to accommodate climate control, windscreen wiper adjustment, and a windscreen washer and heating system.

=== X-Bow GTX ===
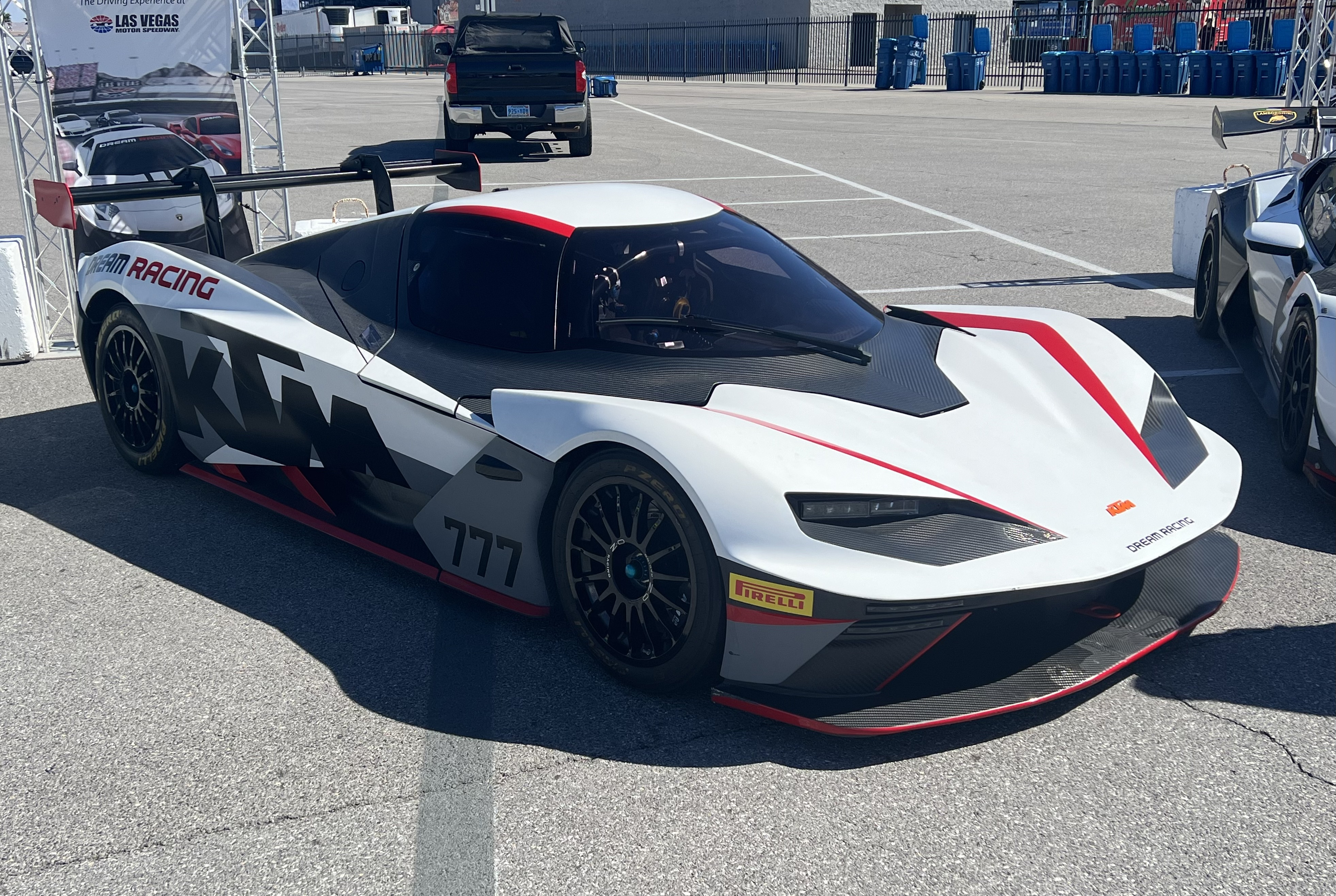
KTM X-Bow GTX

The X-Bow GTX is a longer wheelbase track-only race car version released in October 2020, manufactured in collaboration with Reiter Engineering. Aesthetically, the design is very different to the standard X-Bow. The car uses a different engine to the standard X-Bow, making use of a 2.5-litre Audi TFSI 20-valve I5 engine sourced from the Audi RS3. The 6-speed Holinger sequential transmission and carbon fiber monocoque are retained. The inline-5 engine receives a number of upgrades for racing, including upgrades to the engine management system, injection valves, waste gate, intake, and exhaust. The fuse box comes from Reiter's subsidiary company Sareni United. It also comes with fully electric power steering.

=== X-Bow GT-XR ===
The X-Bow GT-XR is a long wheelbase street legal model of the X-Bow based on the GTX and GT2 track-only race car models, built in a collaborative effort with Reiter Engineering. The car maintains the 2.5-litre Audi TFSI 20-valve I5 from the GTX, now producing 493 hp (368 kW; 500 PS) and 429 lb⋅ft (582 N⋅m) of torque, with power delivered through a 7-speed DSG gearbox. The GT-XR also contains a 95-litre (21 imp gal; 25 US gal) fuel tank. As a result of the car's more refined construction in comparison with the shorter wheelbase X-Bow models, it is the heaviest car in the lineup, with a dry weight of 1,250 kg (2,756 lb) with a 44:56 ratio for weight distribution. Its 0–60 mph (0–97 km/h) factory time is 3.4 seconds and has a top speed of 174 mph (280 km/h). It costs €284,900.

== Motorsport ==
The KTM X-Bow has been the selected car for use in the Race of Champions all-star event since 2008.

The KTM X-Bow Battle race series started in 2010 and was a support event for the DTM German Touring Car series at Adria Raceway in 2010 and Lausitzring in 2011.

Marcus Clutton and Phil Keen won the Supersports category with a modified X-Bow in the 2009 British GT Championship.

=== SRO GT4 ===
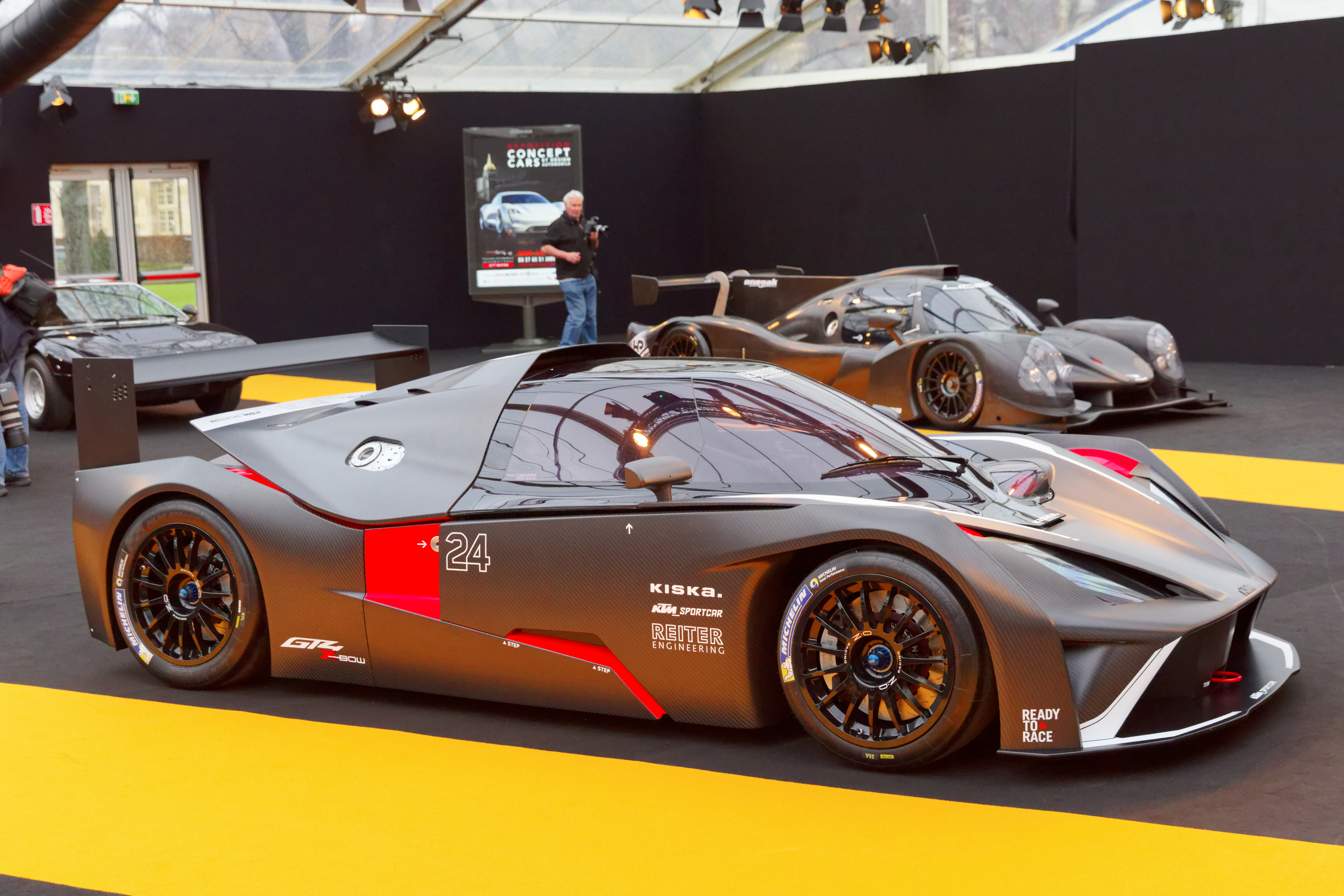
The X-Bow GT4 on display at the 2016 Festival Automobile International.

A modified KTM X-Bow was raced in the Supersport category of the 2008 FIA GT4 Championship. Catharina Felser, Christopher Haase, and Dennis Retera took a podium finish at Monza, and pole position in the wet qualifying session at Nogaro. Peter Belshaw and Marcus Clutton were the GT4 champions in the 2011 season of the British GT Championship in a modified X-Bow.

KTM teased a factory GT4 version of the X-Bow in 2014, which they would later unveil in 2015. The X-Bow GT4 was built in collaboration with Reiter Engineering and KISKA GmbH. The vehicle features a closed cockpit design to comply with class regulations. It also maintains the 2.0-litre turbocharged Audi inline-4 engine and the 6-speed Holinger sequential transmission, but both are modified for racing. To accommodate the rules and regulations, the wheelbase is extended by 17 cm. The X-Bow GT4 debuted in the 2015 GT4 European Series and took its first win in its debut at the Circuit Zandvoort round. It also powered Brett Sandberg to the 2016 Pirelli World Challenge GTS Championship with multiple wins. An upgrade was introduced in 2018 with improvements in durability and performance.

An evolution model for the X-Bow GT4 was released in 2019 as the X-Bow GT4 Evo. The update was directed towards increasing the car's straight-line speed while maintaining the cornering capabilities of the previous X-Bow GT4. It also received a power increase, now producing 375 hp (280 kW; 380 PS) under balance of performance.

=== SRO GT2 ===
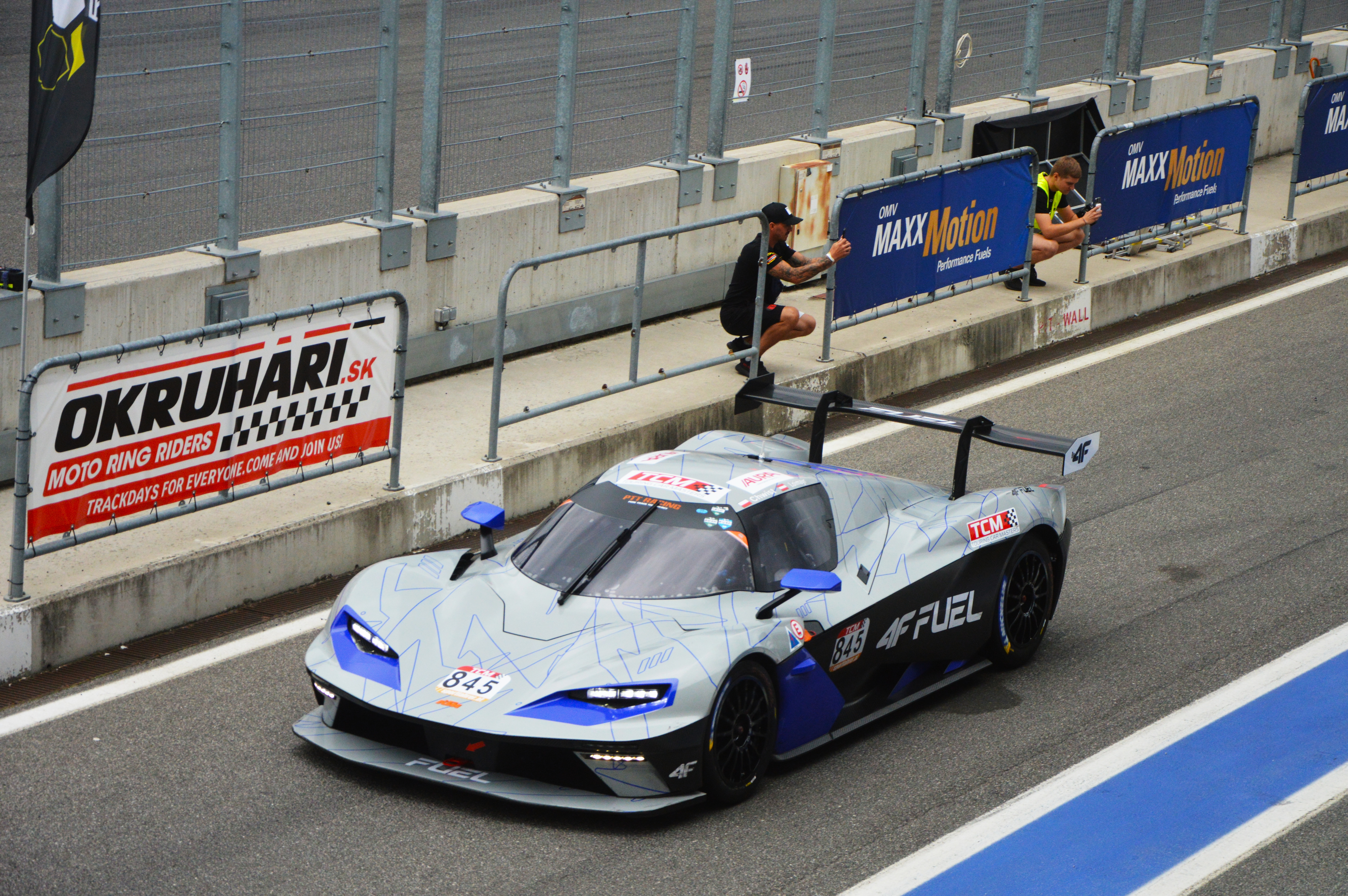
The X-Bow GT2 Concept in the pitlane at the Automotodróm Slovakia Ring circuit.

A SRO GT2 specification race car of the X-Bow was released alongside the GTX model in October 2020, which would be unveiled as the X-Bow GT2 Concept. The GT2 Concept is based on the GTX, but is more powerful than its road-going counterpart. It debuted in the 2021 Fanatec GT2 European Series.

KTM introduced an Evo kit for the X-Bow in 2025, which featured several upgrades to the car, including an increase in power and improved aero.

== Reception ==
In a March 2012 episode of Top Gear, presenter Jeremy Clarkson drove a X-Bow GT around Donington Park circuit in England. He applauded the tyres' grip, saying during a James May-inspired session of doughnuts, "it's like driving on superglue", but both May and Clarkson criticised the complicated procedure needed to start the engine, calling it "idiotic".

== In video games ==
The X-Bow appeared in Gran Turismo 6, GT Racing: Motor Academy, Asphalt 6: Adrenaline, and Asphalt 3D.

The X-Bow R model appeared in Grid 2, Grid Autosport, Real Racing 3, Forza Motorsport 7, Assetto Corsa, CSR Racing 2, The Crew 2, The Crew Motorfest, Gran Turismo 6, Gran Turismo Sport, Gran Turismo 7, and Project CARS 2.

The X-Bow GT4 appears in Asphalt 8: Airborne, Project CARS 2, Forza Horizon 4, Assetto Corsa, Forza Horizon 5, Forza Motorsport (2023 video game), Forza Horizon 6, Asphalt 9: Legends, and Need for Speed: No Limits.

The X-Bow GT2 appears in Assetto Corsa Competizione.

== Awards and recognition ==
The X-Bow won the Sports Car of the Year award from British motoring show Top Gear in 2008.

== See also ==
- Polaris Slingshot
- Ariel Atom
