= Asphalt Xtreme =

2016 racing video game

- Asphalt Xtreme app icon for Android and iOS versions
- Developers: Gameloft Madrid (2016–2017); Gameloft Barcelona (2017–2020) (Note: Additional works by Gameloft Vietnam, Alive Interactive Media, Inc, Pole Position Production, Soundwave Concepts Pty. Ltd. and The Audio Guys Limited)
- Publishers: Gameloft (2016–2021); Netflix (2021–present)
- Series: Asphalt
- Platforms: iOS; Android; Microsoft Windows; Windows 10 Mobile
- Release: October 27, 2016
- Genre: Racing
- Modes: Single-player, multiplayer

Asphalt Xtreme, also known as Asphalt Xtreme: Rally Racing, is an action racing video game developed by Gameloft and published by Netflix. The thirteenth major game and the only off-road racing edition in the Asphalt series. It was released on October 27, 2016 for Android and iOS mobile devices. A Microsoft Store version for Windows 10 devices was released a few days later, on 3 November 2016.

Development lasted from August 2015 to September 2017, and was terminated after the layoffs of 60 people and the shutdown of Gameloft's Madrid studio. From November 2021, through a contract between Gameloft and Netflix, Netflix acquired the publishing rights for the game and started hosting Asphalt Xtreme servers for the mobile versions of the game, and re-released the app on the Google Play Store and App Store on the 22 November of 2021. Players must have a Netflix account with an active subscription in order to play the game.

== Gameplay ==
The video game features a lineup of rally cars, monster trucks and muddy or snowy environments. While the controls were the same as the previous Asphalt games, the nitro and speed mechanics were changed. Instead of there being one single nitro bar, as in previous Asphalt games, there were three nitro "Segments", and using the extra nitro booster powerup, this number could be increased to four. Perfect Nitro was renamed to Long Nitro, and a new nitro boost called "triple nitro" activated all three or four bars at the same time for added speed. When a race started, the vehicles were given 2 nitro segments. Different types of vehicles acquire boost at different rates based on certain play styles. For example, buggies gained large amounts of nitro from performing airborne stunts, while SUVs performed drifts to maintain their nitro boost. Also, driving on water and rocks greatly decreased the speed of your vehicle, unlike other Asphalt games, where slowdown due to rocks and water was either mild or nonexistent, as with water in Asphalt 7, Asphalt 8, and Asphalt Legends Unite.

Unlike the previous games, different types of vehicles had significant effects on gameplay. Lighter vehicles, such as buggies and rally cars, were generally aerodynamic and could pull off aerial stunts easily, while heavier vehicles, such as trucks and SUVs, struggled to perform the same tasks, and gained less boost as a result. This differed from previous Asphalt games, where the car's speeds depended on their rank.

The Infected mode was also carried over from Asphalt 8, albeit with several changes. Compared to Asphalt 8, there are more ways to get infected in Asphalt Xtreme, but infected players started out with less time being infected; 20 seconds compared to 30 seconds. Players could extend their infected time by performing aerial stunts and drifting, something not possible in Asphalt 8. Also, when the infected timer ran out, players did not get an infection overload, unlike Asphalt 8, but rather lost their Infected state and gained a full tank of Nitro. In both games, players could become infected again.

There were thirty-five licensed cars initially available in Asphalt Xtreme, as well as thirty-one more cars added through updates. The cars were divided into five classes and seven categories, and their performance was determined by the Rank rating feature, carried over from Asphalt 8. Asphalt Xtreme featured five different locations at release, as well as three more locations added through updates. Each location featured multiple layouts.

== Soundtrack ==
The soundtrack for Asphalt Xtreme featured artists such as Rise Against, Eagles of Death Metal, Finger Eleven, Nothing But Thieves, The Dead Weather, Barns Courtney, Wavves, Cage the Elephant, Drenge, Battle Tapes, Ratatat, Monster Truck, Tiësto, Swanky Tunes, and more.

== Development ==
The game is rumored to have the same physics engine as Asphalt 8: Airborne and Asphalt Nitro. Asphalt Xtreme is an off-road racing game in the Asphalt series. In the Asphalt 8 update, in Rio, appears a billboard with a poster of Asphalt Xtreme.

== Reception ==
Reception

Aggregate score
Aggregator	Score
Metacritic	76/100

== Shutdown ==
In-game purchases were made unavailable starting September 2021. The shutdown was started on September 10, 2021, and the game was fully shutdown on September 30, 2021. The game was no longer available on the app stores for all supported devices following with the shutdown from October 1, 2021.

== Reback ==
From November 2021, through a contract between Gameloft and Netflix, Netflix started hosting the servers for the game again. The game was put back up on app platforms, under Netflix's name instead of Gameloft's. Players must have a Netflix account with an active subscription in order to play the game.
