= Asphalt (series) =

Racing video game series

- Logo used since July 2024
- Genre: Racing
- Developer: Gameloft: Others Virtuos Clickteam Microsoft
- Publisher: Gameloft: Others Ubisoft Konami Taito Clickteam Microsoft Netflix
- Creators: Stanislas Dewavrin; François Lionet
- Platform: List: macOS; iOS; tvOS; Windows; Windows RT; Windows Phone; Android; Wear OS; N-Gage; Java ME; Symbian; DSiWare; Nintendo DS; Nintendo 3DS; Nintendo Switch; PlayStation Portable; PlayStation Vita; PlayStation 4; PlayStation 5; BlackBerry OS; BlackBerry Tablet OS; Bada; Tizen; webOS; BREW; Freebox; Browser; DoJa; Xbox One; Xbox Series X/S; Arcade
- First release: Asphalt: Urban GT; October 26, 2004
- Latest release: Asphalt Track Star; September 9, 2026

Asphalt is a series of racing video games mainly developed and published by Gameloft. The series typically focuses on fast-paced arcade racing set in various locales throughout the world, where players compete in illegal street races while evading the local law enforcement.

Originally Asphalt had been made and released for mobile and handheld systems but recent titles have expanded to home consoles and computers as well as arcades. Incarnations of the original game from 2004 for various other platforms soon followed, the latest in the main series being Asphalt Legends released in 2018; a number of spinoffs were also released, such as the endless runner Asphalt Overdrive, Asphalt Nitro, a minimal version of Asphalt for low-end devices with procedural generation as a selling point, Asphalt Xtreme, an off-road-centric entry into the series, and the drag racing game Asphalt Street Storm. The series has remained one of the most globally popular mobile games since the late 2000s.

In 2026, Gameloft announced that the franchise had accumulated over 1.7 billion downloads in total.

== Common elements ==
The series puts emphasis on fast-paced, arcade-style street racing in the vein of Need for Speed, along with elements from other racing games such as Ridge Racer and Burnout; the spin-off game Asphalt Xtreme takes place in an off-road racing setting, with open-wheel buggies, sport-utility vehicles and rally cars in lieu of supercars as in previous games. Each game in the series puts players behind the wheel of licensed sports cars from various manufacturers, from entry-level models such as the Dodge Dart GT and the Mitsubishi Lancer Evolution, to supercars like the Bugatti Veyron and the Koenigsegg Regera, and even concept cars such as Mercedes-Benz's Biome design study and the Mercedes-Benz Lightning concept car.

Police chases are a recurring gameplay element especially in the early games, but were de-emphasized in favour of stunt jumps and aerobatic maneuvers as of Airborne; they made a return, however, with Overdrive, Asphalt 9: Legends and Nitro, the latter of which combined elements from Airborne and previous games in the series.

Over the course of the games, players are gradually given access to various race courses, most of which are modelled after real-world locations and major cities, and upgrades for vehicles which can be bought from money earned in a race, or in later games, points or through in-application purchases using real currency. Events are presented in increasing difficulty as players advance through the game, sometimes requiring them to complete bonus challenges, e.g. taking down a given number of opponent racers or finishing the race without wrecking their vehicle.

== History ==
The first mainline game in the series is Asphalt: Urban GT, which was released for the Nintendo DS and N-Gage in 2004, with simplified versions for J2ME mobile phones being released on December 2. Asphalt Urban GT (which was a paid game, not free-to-play) was a considerable success, with over 5 million units sold. A video on Gameloft's YouTube channel however lists their mobile phone adaptation of Speed Devils as the first game in the series.

Asphalt 5 was the first game in the series to be released for Android. Asphalt 4: Elite Racing was the first game in the series to be released for iOS. Asphalt 6: Adrenaline marks the first game in the series to be released for macOS; later home computer releases in the series are exclusive to Microsoft Windows, with Asphalt 7: Heat being the first to be released on the Windows Store.

Asphalt 8: Airborne, the eighth main installment and tenth title overall, was released in 2013 for iOS, Android, Windows and Blackberry platforms to critical acclaim, becoming one of the bestselling games on the iOS App Store and Google Play Store. Asphalt 8: Airborne is the highest-rated video game on Metacritic to have been developed in Spain; it was created by Gameloft Barcelona.

Asphalt 8: Airborne placed a greater emphasis on arcade-style gameplay and introduced an increased focus on aerial stunts. Tracks featured ramps that allowed players to perform barrel rolls and flat spins, with successful stunts contributing to the player's nitro boost. Asphalt 9: Legends later introduced TouchDrive, a control scheme that automates steering and acceleration while allowing the player to control actions such as braking and nitro.

Asphalt Nitro, the twelfth title in the series, was quietly released on Gameloft's own app store in May 2015 for Android, alongside a 2.5D J2ME version of the game for feature phones. A main selling point of Nitro was the game's small resource footprint, which was aided by the use of procedural generation.

A free-to-play spinoff entitled Asphalt Overdrive was released for iOS and Android in September 2014. Unlike prior titles in the series, the game is presented as an "endless runner" similar to the Temple Run franchise and Subway Surfers, and does not offer a traditional racing mode. Overdrive was then followed by Asphalt Xtreme, which focuses on arcade-style off-road racing, and in 2016 with Asphalt: Street Storm, a rhythm-based drag racing game in the vein of NaturalMotion's CSR Racing. Street Storm was quietly released in the Philippines in December 2016 for iOS devices.

The ninth and latest mainline game in the series, Asphalt Legends, was released worldwide on July 25, 2018, for Nintendo Switch on October 8, 2019, for macOS on January 17, 2020, for Xbox One and Xbox Series X/S on August 31, 2021, and for PlayStation 4 and PlayStation 5 on July 17, 2024; the latter platforms were given a release following the Legends Unite expansion update. the game introduces a more advanced nitro system, far more frequent and impactful jumps in the gameplay, as well as 360° spins of the cars to eliminate opponents, while also adding new game modes over the course of updates.

In 2026, Gameloft trademarked Asphalt Hyperdrive without revealing the project to the public.

== Games ==
Release timeline Main series in bold
2004	**Asphalt: Urban GT**
2005	**Asphalt: Urban GT 2**
2005	Asphalt: Import Tuner Edition
2006	**Asphalt 3: Street Rules**
2007
2008	**Asphalt 4: Elite Racing**
2009	Asphalt Online
2009	**Asphalt 5**
2010	**Asphalt 6: Adrenaline**
2011	Asphalt Audi RS 3
2011	Asphalt 3D
2011	Asphalt: Injection
2012	**Asphalt 7: Heat**
2013	**Asphalt 8: Airborne**
2014	Asphalt Overdrive
2015	Asphalt Nitro
2016	Asphalt Xtreme
2017	Asphalt Street Storm
2018	**Asphalt Legends**
2019
2020	Asphalt Retro
2021	Asphalt 8: Airborne+
2022
2023	Asphalt Nitro 2
2024	Asphalt Moto Blitz DX
2025
2026	Asphalt Track Star

Main series in chronological order:

- Asphalt: Urban GT (N-Gage, Nintendo DS, J2ME, BREW, DoJa)
- Asphalt: Urban GT 2 (N-Gage, Nintendo DS, Symbian, PSP, J2ME)
- Asphalt 3: Street Rules (N-Gage 2.0, Symbian, Windows Mobile, J2ME, Android)
- Asphalt 4: Elite Racing (N-Gage 2.0, iOS, DSiWare, Symbian OS, Windows Mobile, J2ME, BlackBerry OS)
- Asphalt 5 (iOS, Android, Symbian, Windows Phone 7, Bada, webOS, Freebox)
- Asphalt 6: Adrenaline (iOS, OS X, Android, Symbian, J2ME, BlackBerry Tablet OS, Bada, webOS, Freebox)
- Asphalt 7: Heat (iOS, Android, Windows Phone 8, Windows 8, Windows 10, BlackBerry 10, BlackBerry Tablet OS, Fire OS)
- Asphalt 8: Airborne (iOS, Android, Windows Phone 8, Windows RT, Windows 8, BlackBerry 10, Windows 10, Windows 10 Mobile, tvOS, macOS, Tizen, Fire OS)
  - Asphalt 8: Airborne+ (Apple Arcade/iOS)
- Asphalt Legends (iOS, Android, Windows 10, Nintendo Switch, Nintendo Switch 2, macOS, Xbox One, Xbox Series X/S, Arcade, PS4, PS5, Fire OS)
- Asphalt Hyperdrive (rumors following a trademark filing in 2026)

Spin-offs and other titles in chronological order:

- Asphalt: Import Tuner Edition (J2ME, BREW)
- Asphalt Online (DoJa, BREW)
- Asphalt Audi RS 3 (iOS)
- Asphalt 3D (Nintendo 3DS)
- Asphalt: Injection (PS Vita, Android)
- Asphalt Overdrive (iOS, Android, Windows Phone 8, Windows 8, Windows 10, Windows 10 Mobile)
- Asphalt Nitro (Android, Java ME, Tizen, Fire OS)
- Asphalt Xtreme (iOS, Android, Windows 8, Windows Phone 8, Windows 10, Windows 10 Mobile)
- Asphalt Street Storm Racing (iOS, Android, Windows 8, Windows 10)
- Asphalt Retro (Browser)
- Asphalt Nitro 2 (Android)
- Asphalt Moto Blitz DX (Arcade)
- Asphalt Track Star (Wear OS, Android)

== Reception ==
Aggregate review scores
Game	GameRankings	Metacritic
Asphalt: Urban GT	62% (DS); 82% (Java); 67% (BREW); 72% (NG) (Note: Gamerankings scores archived at https://gr.blade.sk)	60/100 (DS); 76/100 (NG)
Asphalt: Urban GT 2	65% (DS); 62% (MOBI); 35% (PSP)	42/100 (PSP)
Asphalt 4: Elite Racing	78% (DS); 90% (iOS)	78/100 (DS)
Asphalt 5	87% (iOS)	82/100 (iOS)
Asphalt 6: Adrenaline	82% (iOS)	79/100 (iOS)
Asphalt 3D	47% (3DS)	43/100 (3DS)
Asphalt: Injection	51% (Vita)	49/100 (Vita)
Asphalt 7: Heat	81% (iOS)	83/100 (iOS)
Asphalt 8: Airborne	92% (iOS)	91/100 (iOS)
Asphalt Overdrive	56% (iOS)	59/100 (iOS)
Asphalt Xtreme	73% (iOS)	77/100 (iOS)
Asphalt 9: Legends	72% (NS); 73% (iOS)	61/100 (NS); 74/100 (iOS)

In April 2008, Gameloft reported that the series has had 10 million downloads, making it the most popular mobile game franchise in the world at the time.

In 2020, Pocket Gamer wrote that "The Asphalt series has been one of the biggest names in mobile gaming for, oh, 15 years now."
