= Asphalt 7: Heat =

2012 racing video game

- App icon featuring a Lamborghini Aventador
- Developer: Gameloft Montreal
- Publisher: Gameloft
- Series: Asphalt
- Platforms: iOS, Android, BlackBerry 10, Windows Phone 8, BlackBerry Tablet OS, Microsoft Windows
- Release: iOS: WW: June 21, 2012; Android: WW: June 25, 2012; BlackBerry 10: WW: February 21, 2013; Windows Phone 8: WW: February 27, 2013; BlackBerry Tablet OS: WW: April 3, 2013; Microsoft Windows: WW: August 22, 2013
- Genre: Racing
- Modes: Single-player, multiplayer

Asphalt 7: Heat is a 2012 racing video game developed by Gameloft Montreal and published by Gameloft, and the ninth major game of the Asphalt series. It was released on June 21, 2012 for the iOS and marks the first time in the series that a game is the same for both the iPhone and iPad. The game was launched for Android on June 25, for BlackBerry 10 on February 21, 2013, for Windows Phone 8 on February 27, for BlackBerry PlayBook on April 3, and for Windows 8 (via Windows Store) on August 22, and Windows 10 on July 29, 2015. In 2017, the game was retired from the app stores except on BlackBerry.

== Gameplay ==
Gameplay in Asphalt 7. The player is currently drifting.

Gameplay in Asphalt 7 is very similar to that of previous games in the Asphalt series, with the player given the option of tilting the device, touching the side of the screen, or using an onscreen virtual steering-wheel to steer. The game also has an online multiplayer mode, both local through Wi-Fi and Bluetooth, and global through an internet connection.

The five star rating system for each race, the use of primary and secondary objectives and the "Adrenaline mode" from Asphalt 6: Adrenaline have all been retained in Asphalt 7. There are 80 licensed cars available in the game, divided into 7 tiers.

== Reception ==
Asphalt 7: Heat
(iOS version)

Aggregate scores
Aggregator	Score
GameRankings	81%
Metacritic	83/100

Review scores
Publication	Score
IGN	8/10
148Apps	4/5
MacLife	3/5
Slide to Play	3/4
TouchGen	4/5
Wired	6/10

Upon its release, Asphalt 7 received generally favorable reviews. The iOS version holds an aggregate score of 83 out of 100 on Metacritic, based on seventeen reviews, and a score of 81% on GameRankings, based on seven reviews.

IGN's George Roush was enthusiastic about the game, awarding a score of 8 out of 10, and concluding "If you're as much of a fan of the Asphalt series as I am then you're going to love Heat. It's nice to see that Gameloft is improving each entry while managing to keep the cost low. Race junkies are going to love looking for shortcuts, catching air and blasting their way through the beautiful looking tracks to the sound of energetic techno music." TouchGen's Dave LeClair was also impressed, scoring the game 4 out of 5; "Overall, this is a great racing game. It has a couple of minor flaws, but nothing gamebreaking. The social sharing hooks after every race can be a little annoying, and they delay the time getting to the next race. Still, slight problems aside, fans of racing games will enjoy the total package offered in Asphalt 7: Heat." Lisa Caplan of 148Apps also scored it 4 out of 5, praising the graphics and controls, although criticizing the gameplay as being very similar to its predecessors; "for the price Asphalt 7 is one of the best arcade racers on iOS. What it lacks in originality it makes up for in polish."

Slide to Play's Nadia Oxford was somewhat less impressed, feeling the game wasn't differentiated enough from the previous games in the series, an argument Andrew Podolsky had made in his review of Asphalt 6 for the site. As with both Asphalt 5 and Asphalt 6, the game was scored 3 out of 4. Oxford wrote "The Asphalt series needs someone to open the windows and let some fresh air in, but it's still impossible to go really go wrong with Asphalt 7: Heat. If you're still happy with Asphalt 6 and you want to save that dollar for ice cream, go ahead and hang onto Adrenaline. You'll live without Heat. But if you don't own an Asphalt game, or if any upgrades to the series makes you happy, regardless of how small those upgrades are, go ahead and grab Asphalt 7: Heat. It's still money well-spent." MacLife's Matt Clark scored the game 3 out of 5, also criticizing its similarity to earlier games in the series, but praising the graphics; "if there's one way that Asphalt 7 improves the series, it's the visual presentation. The vehicles and environments look fantastic on the Retina Display."

Ryan Whitwam of AndroidPolice was less enthused and was heavily critical of several aspects, such as the need to be online for the game to work, the use of real world money and, especially, the graphics; "the deal breaker for me is the overwhelming mediocrity of the graphics. Judging from the screenshots on the Play Store page, this should be a gorgeous game. Instead, it's just average. Even then, only on some devices. On the Nexus 7 the texture resolution is absolutely terrible. Everything in the environment looks muddy. The cars aren't bad, but there is noticeable aliasing along the edges." Wired.com's Ryan Rigney was even more critical, scoring the game 6 out of 10 and criticising the implementation of in-app purchases; "I can't imagine anyone ever spending money on them. Even if you buy the $100 pack of 200 stars, that still won't unlock everything in the game; not by a long shot. So what's the point?" Rigney did however, praise the graphics, arguing that the game has a "polish that would be impressive for an Xbox Live Arcade game. No other arcade racer on the App Store comes close to matching Asphalt 7's presentation quality."
