= Spawn =

Spawn or spawning may refer to:

- Spawning, the eggs and sperm of aquatic animals

== Arts, entertainment and media ==
- Spawn (character), a fictional character in the comic series of the same name and in the associated franchise
  - Spawn: Armageddon, a 2003 video game based on the comic series for sixth-generation consoles
  - Spawn: In the Demon's Hand, a 1999 arcade game based on the comic series
  - Spawn (1997 film), a cinema adaptation of the comic series
  - Spawn (1999 video game), a video game for the Game Boy Color
  - King Spawn (film), an upcoming American superhero film
  - Spawn: Godslayer, a spin-off comic series
  - Todd McFarlane's Spawn (also known as Spawn: The Animated Series), an American adult animation television series which aired on HBO from 1997 through 1999
- Spawn (novel), a 1983 horror novel by Shaun Hutson
- Spawn, a 1993 album by Rise Robots Rise
- "Spawn Again", a song on the 1999 album Neon Ballroom by Silverchair
- Spawn (Again): A Tribute to Silverchair, a 2017 compilation album by various UNFD artists
- Spawning (video games), the in-game creation or re-creation of an entity
- "SPAWN", a 2025 track by Toby Fox from Deltarune Chapters 3+4 OST from the video game Deltarune

== Other uses ==
- Spawn (computing), a function that executes a child process
- SPAWN (Salmon Protection and Watershed Network), a project of the Turtle Island Restoration Network (TIRN), a United States 501(c)(3) nonprofit environmental organization
- Spawning bed, an installation used in fishery management to increase fish reproduction
- Spawning networks, a type of computer network

== See also ==
- Respawn (disambiguation)
