= Asphalt 5 =

2009 video game

- App icon featuring a Lamborghini Murciélago SV
- Developers: Gameloft Bucharest; Gameloft Mexico (Android, Windows Phone)
- Publisher: Gameloft
- Series: Asphalt
- Platforms: iOS, Freebox, webOS, Android, Symbian^3, Bada, Windows Phone 7
- Release: iOS: WW: November 2, 2009 (iPhone); WW: April 2, 2010 (iPad); Freebox: FRA: January 1, 2010; webOS: WW: January 8, 2010; Android: WW: March 18, 2010; Bada: WW: August 13, 2010; Symbian: WW: October 2010; Windows Phone: WW: July 16, 2012
- Genre: Racing
- Modes: Single-player, multiplayer

Asphalt 5 is a 2009 racing video game developed and published by Gameloft and is the fifth major game of the Asphalt series. It was released for iOS on November 2, 2009, for webOS on January 8, 2010, for Android on March 18, for Symbian^3 and Bada on December 22, and for Windows Phone 7 on July 16, 2012.

== Gameplay ==
Gameplay showing the virtual steering wheel control option; the brake is on the right, above it is the turbo button.

Asphalt 5's gameplay is very similar to that of Asphalt 4: Elite Racing and Ferrari GT: Evolution, with the player given the option of either tilting the device, touching the side of the screen to steer or using a virtual on-screen steering wheel. The iPhone version of the game uses landscape steering. The game also has a multiplayer mode, both local through Wi-Fi and Bluetooth, and global through an internet connection.

There are 30 licensed vehicles available and 17 locations to race at.

== Reception ==
Asphalt 5
(iOS version)

Aggregate scores
Aggregator	Score
GameRankings	87%
Metacritic	82/100

Review scores
Publication	Score
IGN	8/10
Slide to Play	3/4
TouchGen	4/5
TouchArcade	4.5/5
WMPowerUser	2/5

Upon its release, Asphalt 5 received generally favorable reviews. The iOS version holds an aggregate score of 82 out of 100 on Metacritic, based on six reviews, and 87% on GameRankings, also based on six reviews.

IGN's Levi Buchanan awarded the game a score of 8 out of 10, lauding the fact that it didn't take itself too seriously; "Asphalt 5 is a pure arcade racer. It combines the smash 'em elements of Burnout and the hardcore racing thrills of Ridge Racer into a sometimes silly but always manic speeder. If you go into this expecting a precision driving sim along the lines of Real Racing, you will be severely disappointed. But if you download Asphalt 5 with the expectation of Mr. Toad's Wild Ride with Ferraris, you will be suitably satisfied."

TouchArcade were similarly impressed, scoring the game 4.5 out of 5, and praising the graphics; "Even though you may not be focused on the details, Gameloft obviously has. Whether racing through snow-covered freeways, mud soaked roads, or the darkness of night, the details are everywhere. From the signs on storefronts to damage on vehicles, Gameloft has definitely spent a good deal of development creating an arcade experience with good degree of visuals."

ToughGen's Dave LeClair was also impressed, scoring the game 4 out of 5, also praising the graphics; "This is best looking game so far. There are over 30 different cars in the game, and each looks as if it was gone over with a fine tooth comb, because they all look incredible. The 12 cities in the game also look fantastic, and are nothing but a pleasure to play. The very first level is played in a snowy area, and as you are driving, snow actually hits the screen and melts away. It's this fine attention to detail that really sets Asphalt 5 apart in the graphics department."

Slide to Play's Andrew Podolsky was slightly less enthusiastic, scoring it 3 out of 4, and criticizing the physics; "it's an over-the-top, incredibly bouncy racer that plays a bit more like Jelly Car than Real Racer. While we like arcade racers a lot, these cars don't seem to have any real weight or power behind them, even though they look great on the road and in the garage." They were also critical of the difficulty of "Elimination" mode and called the option to purchase scantily-clad female models who give bonuses during races "juvenile, even for a racing videogame."

Andrew Bares of WMPoweruser was unimpressed with the 2012 Windows Phone port, scoring the game 2 out of 5 and arguing "any game nowadays that doesn't support Mango multitasking AND doesn't even support NoDo resuming to your paused state is a total fail. Respond to a text message in the middle of the race and you have to wait ~8 seconds for the game to load and then it puts you back at the start line, losing all your progress!"

A Sony PSP 'Minis' version was planned according to IGN, GameSpy and GameStats but ultimately never saw a release on the platform. To date, only the icon exists for this version.
