= Asphalt: Urban GT 2 =

2005 video game

- Cover art featuring a Mercedes-Benz SLK 55 AMG (left) and a Lamborghini Murcielago (right) being chased by a police helicopter
- Developer: Gameloft Montreal (Note: PlayStation Portable version developed by Virtuos and Game Source)
- Publisher: Gameloft
- Series: Asphalt
- Platforms: J2ME, N-Gage (Symbian), Nintendo DS, PlayStation Portable
- Release: N-Gage: EU: November 7, 2005; NA: November 10, 2005; J2ME: WW: November 30, 2005; Nintendo DS: NA: November 14, 2006; EU: November 24, 2006; AU: November 30, 2006; PlayStation Portable: AU: March 22, 2007; EU: March 30, 2007
- Genre: Racing
- Modes: Single-player, multiplayer

Asphalt: Urban GT 2 is a racing video game developed by Gameloft Montreal and published by Gameloft for the Nintendo DS, N-Gage and PlayStation Portable. A J2ME version for mobile phones with 2.5D graphics was also released on November 30, 2005. It is a sequel of Asphalt: Urban GT (2004) and the second major title of the Asphalt series.

The game features a special appearance from The Pussycat Dolls, and a sample of Moby's single "Lift Me Up". The Nintendo DS version was released a year after the N-Gage version, with improved graphics, sound, and dual screen compatibility. A version for the PSP was also released in March 2007, which features the track "Apply Some Pressure" by Maxïmo Park and adds an exclusive "Time Ride" Mode for the Arcade mode. The next title in the series was Asphalt 3: Street Rules, which would only be released for mobile phones; the next console release would be the Nintendo DSi version of Asphalt 4: Elite Racing in 2009.

== Gameplay ==
Screenshot from the PlayStation Portable version depicting a Saleen S7 racing in San Francisco with the Golden Gate Bridge seen in the background

The gameplay of Urban GT 2 is often compared to Burnout, Need for Speed and similar titles as players can eliminate other opponents or police cars by performing takedowns. This is done by either forcing them into the wall or ramming them while using a nitrous oxide boost which temporarily increases the vehicle's acceleration and top speed for a short duration.

The game uses a "wanted" meter governing law enforcement response to players while street racing, especially if nitrous is used, if the player commits property destruction (Note: Referred to in-game as "Urban Havoc") or disables other competitors and law enforcement vehicles by ramming them off the road.

As with the previous entry in the series, Urban GT 2 takes place in tracks modelled after real-world locations; many of the tracks from the previous game return such as Paris, New York City, Miami, Las Vegas, Cuba, the Chernobyl exclusion zone and Hong Kong, though new tracks such as San Francisco, Rio de Janeiro and Dubai have also been added.

The game features 57 vehicles, 45 of which are licensed from 23 real-world manufacturers such as Aston Martin, Lamborghini, Hummer, Volkswagen, Nissan, and several others. Unlike the previous game whose sole motorcycle is the fictional "Gamelati 1000 SS", Urban GT 2 adds several new licensed motorcycle models in its roster, notably those from Confederate Motors, Ducati and Triumph.

== Reception ==
Reception

Aggregate scores
Aggregator	Score
GameRankings	(DS) 65% (Mobile) 62% (PSP) 30%
Metacritic	(PSP) 42/100

Review scores
Publication	Score
Eurogamer	2/10
GameSpot	7.5/10
PlayStation Official Magazine – UK	5/10

Urban GT 2 was met with mixed reception. GameRankings and Metacritic gave it a score of 65% for the DS version; 62% for the Mobile version; and 30% and 42 out of 100 for the PSP version.

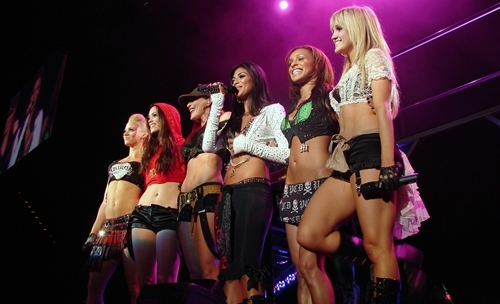
The inclusion of The Pussycat Dolls was criticised by some reviewers as a "marketing gimmick" with no bearing on gameplay.

Frank Provo of GameSpot praised the game's improvements over the original and its selection of licensed vehicles and respective upgrades, but noted the game's poor AI. Andrew Hayward of Worthplaying, however, was more critical of the game, calling it a "mundane exercise in repetition". Besides citing easy difficulty and AI problems, the use of The Pussycat Dolls was also criticised as being a "marketing gimmick".

In a more positive review, Levi Buchanan of IGN praised the mobile version's selection of vehicles and graphics, though Buchanan attributed most of the game's criticism to mobile device limitations.
