= The eSync Alliance =

Automotive technology alliance

- Company type: Consortium, Non-Profit
- Industry: Automotive and other
- Founded: August 25, 2018; 7 years ago
- Headquarters: United States
- Area served: Worldwide
- Key people: Mike Gardner, Executive Director
- Products: Over-the-air (OTA) software and data management platforms
- Members: 11
- Website: esyncalliance.org

The eSync Alliance is a global automotive initiative established to build a secure, multi-vendor platform for end-to-end over-the-air (OTA) updating and data services for the connected car, with a global network of participating suppliers

== History ==
In June 2017, Excelfore publicly announced it would work with several partner companies to form the eSync Alliance as an independent trade association. The aim of the eSync Alliance is to bring automakers, Tier-1 integrators, module and software suppliers into a mutually beneficial partnership to build eSync compliant solutions for the entire vehicle.

In February 2018, Excelfore announced that Rick Kreifeldt, industry executive and former founding chairman of AVNU, joined the eSync Alliance as Executive Director.

In August 2018, the eSync Alliance was incorporated as a non-profit consortium, with 5 founding member companies: Alpine, Excelfore, Hella, Molex and ZF. In September 2018 the eSync Alliance announced the election of officers and management for 2018/2019, and the formation of its first two working groups: Technical Working Group (TWG), and Marketing Working Group (MWG).

In April 2019, the eSync Alliance announced the release of Version 1.0 of the eSync Compliance Specifications. The specifications total nearly 400 pages and consist of Architecture, Requirements, Interfaces and Security.

In June 2019, the eSync Alliance joined the Connected Vehicle Trade Association (CVTA) as an Associate Member.

In June 2020, the eSync Alliance announced that Mike Gardner, founder and president of mG Consulting, was appointed as executive director.

In March 2021, the eSync Alliance released v2.0 of the eSync Specifications for Automotive OTA, expanding the specifications in the areas of cyber security and data gathering.

In April 2021, the eSync Alliance and GENIVI Alliance, now COVESA, announced collaboration in the area of data standardization, as part of the Common Vehicle Interface Initiative (CVII) between GENIVI and W3C. (Note: GENIVI has since rebranded as COVESA - the Connected Vehicle Systems Alliance.)

In November 2021, the eSync Alliance and the Autoware Foundation announced a joint working group to address integration of OTA and data gathering into the software stack for the next generation of autonomous vehicles.

== Software architecture ==
The eSync platform has components in the cloud and in the vehicle. The eSync Server is in the cloud, the eSync Client is in the vehicle and multiple eSync Agents for end devices are in the vehicle.

== Structure ==
The five founding companies of the eSync Alliance each hold one seat on the Board of Directors. Additional board members may be elected by the membership during the Alliance annual general meeting. Current members of the alliance include Alpine, DSA, Excelfore, Faurecia, Hella, Joynext, Mobica, Molex, R Systems and ZF.
