= Asphalt 3D =

2011 racing video game

- North American box art featuring an Aston Martin One-77
- Developer: Gameloft
- Publishers: JP: Konami; WW: Ubisoft
- Series: Asphalt
- Platform: Nintendo 3DS
- Release: JP: March 10, 2011; EU: March 25, 2011; NA: March 27, 2011; AU: March 31, 2011
- Genre: Racing
- Modes: Single player, multiplayer

Asphalt 3D is a 2011 racing game developed by Gameloft and published by Ubisoft for the Nintendo 3DS. The seventh major title of the Asphalt series and the first on a Nintendo system since Asphalt 4: Elite Racing, Asphalt 3D was one of eight 3DS launch titles. A direct conversion of the iOS game Asphalt 6: Adrenaline, Asphalt 3D includes 17 tracks based on real-life locations and 42 licensed sports vehicles. It features several game modes including multiplayer support for up to six players using local wireless play.

Asphalt 3D received negative reviews, with much of the criticism directed at poor controls, numerous bugs, poor visuals, and a choppy framerate. It has received compilation scores of 43/100 and 47% on Metacritic and GameRankings, respectively.

== Gameplay and premise ==
Screenshot of a race in progress

Asphalt 3D is a racing game in which the player must maneuver an automobile to compete against computer-controlled drivers on various race tracks. Players earn rewards such as car upgrades and XP points for winning races throughout the game, and reaching higher levels allows them to unlock better cars. The game features 17 tracks based on real-life locations including San Francisco and Paris. The games also features over 40 licensed sports cars and motorcycles, from companies like Ferrari, Lamborghini, Aston Martin, Bentley, Maserati, BMW, Nissan, Audi and Ducati.

The game features eight game modes, including "Career Mode"; "Vigilante", an elimination mode; a Need for Speed-inspired "High Speed Chase" mode, in which the player must outrun police cars; and a multiplayer option for up to six players using local wireless play. The game makes use of the 3DS system's accelerometer, which is similar to the Asphalt titles on iOS platforms, and allows the player to control the vehicle by moving the game console like a steering wheel. The game also supports StreetPass, which allows ghost data and race statistics to be exchanged with other players.

== Development ==
Asphalt 3D was revealed at the Electronic Entertainment Expo 2010. The game was listed by Ubisoft as one of eight 3DS games they planned to release to coincide with the launch of the 3DS in Europe and North America. The game was released in Japan on March 10, 2011, North America on March 27, 2011, Europe on March 25, 2011, and Australia on March 31, 2011. Asphalt 3D was a direct port of Asphalt 6: Adrenaline, which was released for iOS devices.

Asphalt 3D contains 42 cars, three of which are available at the beginning. In an interview, the developers said that they wanted to include "[...] the newest, fastest and most expensive 2011 [car] models, including the most expensive car in the world, the Bugatti Veyron" in the game.

== Reception ==
Reception

Aggregate scores
Aggregator	Score
GameRankings	47%
Metacritic	43/100

Review scores
Publication	Score
Famitsu	28 out of 40
Game Informer	3.00 out of 10
GamePro	2 out of 5
GameSpot	5.5 out of 10
GamesRadar+	3 out of 10
GameTrailers	4.5 out of 10
IGN	3.0 out of 10
Nintendo World Report	2 out of 10
Official Nintendo Magazine	70%

Asphalt 3D has received negative reviews from critics, holding an average score of 47% at GameRankings and 43/100 at Metacritic, based on 30 and 37 reviews respectively. The game was described by critics as "an absolute joke", "a buggy mess" and "truly horrible" due to "terrible physics, stiff controls and poor graphics", along with frame rate issues and glitches.

IGN's Martin Robinson stated that "a game can't even be bothered to stream its own pre-rendered intro smoothly". Although praising of its "decent car models", GameTrailers noted that it "suffers from choppy performance, lots of pop-in, laughable animations, and tire marks that float above the road in 3D. It's as if it was made merely to look good in screen shots." Justin Towell of GamesRadar felt that the "angular scenery are reminiscent of the N64". The review said overall "So what can I say in summary? It's a £39.99 inferior remix of a £2.99 iPhone game with bad sound, bad graphics and shockingly slapdash collision logic. Not only is it the worst game of the 3DS' launch line-up, it's a contender for the title of 'worst launch game of all time'. Worse than Pen Pen. Worse than Tama. Worse even than Altered Beast. Do I really need to say it? Avoid." Nintendo World Report staff writer Josh Max complained of its lack of tutorial sections and stated that it "does nothing to represent the capabilities of the Nintendo 3DS". In their buyer's guide, NWR writer Matthew Blundon and director Neal Ronaghan stated that "when there are far better racers available, namely Ridge Racer 3D, why waste your money on an inferior product such as Asphalt 3D?"
