= Asphalt Overdrive =

2014 video game

- Cover art featuring a Lamborghini Countach 25th Anniversary being chased by a group of police cars
- Developer: Gameloft Madrid
- Publisher: Gameloft
- Producer: Regina Vyshnevska
- Designers: Andrew Santos; Mathias Takimoto; Alejandro Arque Gallardo
- Programmer: Daniele Lazzarini
- Artists: Thomas Woode; Gwenael Heliou; Arthur Hugot
- Composers: Rodrigo Rubilar; Vincent Labelle
- Series: Asphalt
- Platforms: iOS; Android; Windows Phone; Microsoft Windows
- Release: September 24, 2014
- Genre: Endless runner
- Modes: Single-player, multiplayer

Asphalt Overdrive was a 2014 endless running racing video game published by Gameloft and developed by their Madrid studio. The eleventh major game of Asphalt series. After a showcase in June 2014 at the E3 event, it was released in September 24, 2014 for iOS, Android and Windows Phone, Windows 8.1. The game is officially retired and no longer supported.

Overdrive marks a departure from previous games in the series, as it is an on-rails endless platformer in the vein of Temple Run and Subway Surfers, and takes place in a 80s-style (Note: While the game is presented as having a 1980s aesthetic, Asphalt Overdrive takes place in the present day as evidenced with most of the vehicles used.) rendition of Southern California.

== Gameplay ==
As stated earlier, Asphalt Overdrive is presented as an endless runner, and does not offer a traditional racing mode. Like in previous games, cars accelerate automatically, but are limited to a fixed, endless path with three lanes. Performing stunts and ramming civilian vehicles builds up the nitrous meter, to which the player can use in evading police vehicles.

== Reception ==
Reception

Aggregate score
Aggregator	Score
Metacritic	59/100

Review scores
Publication	Score
Gamezebo	2/5
Pocket Gamer	3/5
TouchArcade	2/5

The iOS version received "mixed" reviews according to the review aggregation website Metacritic.
