= Asphalt: Urban GT =

2004 video game

- European cover art featuring a Lamborghini Murciélago
- Developer: Gameloft Montreal
- Publishers: WW: Gameloft and Ubisoft; JP: Taito
- Director: Stanislas Dewavrin
- Producer: Philippe Laurens
- Designers: Guillaume Descamps, Stanislas Dewavrin
- Programmer: David Nicolier
- Series: Asphalt
- Platforms: N-Gage; Nintendo DS; J2ME (Java 2 Micro Edition); BREW
- Release: N-Gage: EU: October 26, 2004; NA: November 15, 2004; Nintendo DS: NA: November 21, 2004; AU: February 24, 2005; EU: March 11, 2005; JP: June 30, 2005; J2ME: WW: December 2, 2004; BREW: WW: 2005
- Genre: Racing
- Modes: Single player, multiplayer

Asphalt: Urban GT is a 2004 arcade-style racing video game developed by Gameloft Montreal and published by Gameloft (for mobile platforms) and Ubisoft (for the Nintendo DS edition). The first title of the Asphalt series, it was released in October 2004 for the Nokia N-Gage and in November of the same year for the Nintendo DS, making it one of the Nintendo DS' launch titles. Mobile phone versions on J2ME and BREW were also released.

The game features manufacturer licensed cars and takes place in locations modeled after real-world counterparts. Gameplay features a nitro mechanic and allows drifting, and alongside standard races against opponents there are also modes such as cop chases. The DS version has support for wireless multiplayer with up to four opponents. Asphalt: Urban GT received mixed to favorable reviews. It was succeeded by Asphalt: Urban GT 2 in 2005, then through numerous other installments, resulting in the Asphalt series, which is still active.

To mark the 20th anniversary of the franchise, Gameloft re-released the J2ME version of the game for free in the "20th Anniversary Event" section of the Asphalt website.

== Gameplay ==
Gameplay screenshot of the Nintendo DS version

Asphalt: Urban GT sports nine tracks modelled after real-world locations such as Paris, New York City, Miami, Las Vegas, Cuba, Bogotá, Chernobyl, Hong Kong and Texas Motor Speedway. The game's 23 cars are licensed from 14 real manufacturers such as Lamborghini, Hummer, Volkswagen, Nissan, Ford (Shelby), Audi, Aston Martin, Jaguar, Lotus, Morgan, TVR, Chevrolet, Saleen, and others including some of the fictional in-game manufacturers, and can be enhanced with over 30 add-ons. Game modes include instant play, road challenge, free race, time attack, and cop chase. In cop chase, the player takes the role of the police attempting to arrest the other racers.

One distinctive feature of the gameplay is that after several rule violations (such as ramming a competitor’s car to take it out) triggers a police response. This can range from simple car chases to roadblocks set up along the track, and eventually the deployment of helicopters. To evade the police and outpace rival drivers, nitro power-ups are scattered across the circuit. Collecting them grants the player a significant speed boost. When pursued by a helicopter, the player can make sharp turns to avoid its missiles.

The game takes advantage of the DS's support for 3D graphics, showing the action from three camera angles. The N-Gage version uses a software 3D renderer to provide similar visuals at a lower framerate with less detail. The bottom screen of the DS is utilized to provide strategic tips and player info.

== Reception ==
Reception

Aggregate scores
Aggregator	Score		
Aggregator	DS	mobile	N-Gage
GameRankings	62%	67%	72%
Metacritic	60/100	N/A	76/100

Review scores
Publication	Score		
Publication	DS	mobile	N-Gage
Electronic Gaming Monthly	6/10	N/A	N/A
Eurogamer	3/10	N/A	N/A
Famitsu	27/40	N/A	N/A
GamePro	3/5	N/A	N/A
GameRevolution	C−	N/A	N/A
GameSpot	7.5/10	8.2/10	7.5/10
GameSpy	2/5	N/A	N/A
GameZone	7.9/10	N/A	N/A
IGN	5.5/10	7.5/10	N/A
Nintendo Power	3.5/5	N/A	N/A

The N-Gage version received "favorable" reviews, while the DS version received "mixed" reviews, according to video game review aggregator website Metacritic. In Japan, Famitsu gave the latter version a score of one six and three sevens for a total of 27 out of 40.

It received a runner-up position in GameSpot's 2004 "Best N-Gage Game" award category, losing to Colin McRae Rally 2005.

Asphalt: Urban GT was a considerable success for the emerging mobile game market, selling over 5 million copies. It launched the Asphalt franchise, which is currently Gameloft's biggest franchise.
