= Respawn (disambiguation) =

Respawn, in gaming, refers to the re-creation of a character, NPC or item after its death or destruction

Respawn may also refer to:

- "Respawn" (30 Rock), an episode from the American television comedy series 30 Rock
- Respawn Entertainment, an American video game development studio
- Respawn, fictional character of a boy made from the DNA of DC Comics character Deathstroke
- Reincarnation

== See also ==
- Spawn (disambiguation)
