= Network architecture =

Design of a communications network

Network architecture is the design of a computer network. It is a framework for the specification of a network's physical components and their functional organization and configuration, its operational principles and procedures, as well as communication protocols used.

In telecommunications, the specification of a network architecture may also include a detailed description of products and services delivered via a communications network, as well as detailed rate and billing structures under which services are compensated.

The network architecture of the Internet is predominantly expressed by its use of the Internet protocol suite, rather than a specific model for interconnecting networks or nodes in the network, or the usage of specific types of hardware links.

== OSI model ==
The Open Systems Interconnection model (OSI model) defines and codifies the concept of layered network architecture. Abstraction layers are used to subdivide a communications system further into smaller manageable parts. A layer is a collection of similar functions that provide services to the layer above it and receives services from the layer below it. On each layer, an instance provides services to the instances at the layer above and requests services from the layer below.

== Distributed computing ==
In distributed computing, the network architecture often describes the structure and classification of a distributed application architecture, as the participating nodes in a distributed application are often referred to as a network. For example, the applications architecture of the public switched telephone network (PSTN) has been termed the Intelligent Network. There are a number of specific classifications but all lie on a continuum between the dumb network (e.g. the Internet) and the intelligent network (e.g. the PSTN).

A popular example of such usage of the term in distributed applications, as well as permanent virtual circuits, is the organization of nodes in peer-to-peer (P2P) services and networks. P2P networks usually implement overlay networks running over an underlying physical or logical network. These overlay networks may implement certain organizational structures of the nodes according to several distinct models, the network architecture of the system.

== See also ==
- Network topology
- Spawning networks
