= Asphalt 8: Airborne =

2013 video game

- Cover art featuring a McLaren Senna GTR
- Developer: Gameloft Barcelona (Note: Additional work by Gameloft Saigon, Gameloft Montreal, Gameloft Madrid, Gameloft Kharkiv, Gameloft Bucharest, and Alive Interactive Media, Inc.)
- Publisher: Gameloft
- Series: Asphalt
- Platforms: iOS; Android; Windows Phone 8; BlackBerry 10; Fire OS; Tizen; Microsoft Windows; tvOS; macOS; Windows 10 Mobile
- Release: iOS & Android: WW: August 22, 2013; Windows 8 & Windows Phone 8: WW: November 13, 2013; BlackBerry 10: WW: January 15, 2014; Tizen: WW: April 5, 2015; tvOS: WW: October 30, 2015
- Genre: Racing
- Modes: Single-player, multiplayer

Asphalt 8: Airborne is a 2013 racing video game developed by Gameloft Barcelona and published by Gameloft. It is the eighth major installment in the Asphalt series. It was released on August 22, 2013, for iOS and Android; on November 13, 2013, for Windows 8 and Windows Phone 8; on January 15, 2014, for BlackBerry 10; and on April 5, 2015, for Tizen. A premium version of the game, Asphalt 8: Airborne+, was released through Apple Arcade on August 26, 2021. Its successor, Asphalt Legends (originally titled Asphalt 9: Legends), was announced on February 26, 2018.

== Gameplay ==
The game features stunt jumps as a gameplay mechanic and uses high-dynamic-range rendering and pixel shaders for environmental effects.

The gameplay is similar to that of Asphalt 7: Heat, with the player given four control options: "Tilt to steer" (auto-acceleration with movement controlled by tilting the device), "Tilt and icons" (manual acceleration via an on-screen icon, with movement controlled by tilting the device), "On-screen controls" (auto-acceleration with movement controlled by an on-screen virtual steering-wheel), and "Tap to steer" (auto-acceleration with movement controlled by tapping the side of the screen). The Windows 8.1 and Windows 10 versions feature different control schemes, including the WASD and arrow keys.

The five-star rating system with primary and secondary objectives, first introduced in Asphalt 6: Adrenaline, was also used in Asphalt 7 and Asphalt 8. Three stars are awarded for finishing in first place, two for second, and one for third. Achieving secondary objectives, such as performing a given number of stunts or knocking down opponents, awards the player with two additional stars. In the Moto Blitz and Championship modes, players must complete primary objectives to unlock secondary ones. Obtaining stars in an event is cumulative; players who finished first in an event without completing the secondary objectives may replay the race and obtain a five-star rating even if the primary objectives are not met.

Tracks in the game feature more ramps than previous entries in the series, increasing the frequency of aerial maneuvers. In addition to performing standard jumps, the player can also perform flat spins (by drifting off of a ramp) and barrel rolls (by driving off of a curved ramp). It is also possible to perform a barrel roll by driving with half the car on a normal ramp. All jumps earn a boost; the longer the airtime, the more boost earned. Destroying obstacles such as barriers and lamp posts, and hitting or near-missing traffic cars, also earns boost. Another new feature, which replaces the "Adrenaline Mode" from Asphalt 6 and 7, is the ability to perform a "Perfect Nitro". When the player activates the boost, a small red zone appears on the boost bar. If the player activates the boost again when the boost meter is in the red zone, the boost will become stronger, lasting until the player runs out of boost, brakes, crashes, or hits a ramp.

In the initial version of the game, the career mode consisted of 180 events split into eight "seasons", which became progressively more difficult. In later versions, additional challenges and seasons were added. As of March 2020, Asphalt 8 had a total of nine seasons, excluding the "McLaren Legends Season". When the game begins, only the first season is available; later seasons must be unlocked either by earning enough stars or by purchasing a "Season Unlock" (which cannot be used to skip ahead more than one season at a time). The Dubai update introduced a new season where only fully upgraded cars are eligible to participate, while adding three new events centered on the city.

Asphalt 8 is the first game in the Asphalt series to use Game Center for achievements rather than Gameloft's own Gameloft Live. The April 2015 update added support for the Apple Watch, making the game compatible with the iPhone 5 or later models running iOS 8.2 or later via Bluetooth or Wi-Fi. The October 2015 update added support for the Apple TV, while online multiplayer can be accessed both locally and globally via Wi-Fi. There is also a "World Series" online multiplayer mode, although this mode is unavailable on the iPod touch 4 and iPhone 4. Playing multiplayer matches is the only way to increase a player's in-game level; a higher level results in higher credit earnings. The Multiplayer League Update in October 2016 introduced reworked multiplayer gameplay in the form of the "Multiplayer League", where players compete against each other in online multiplayer races to win exclusive rewards.

== Reception ==
Reception

Aggregate score
Aggregator	Score
Metacritic	91/100

Review scores
Publication	Score
Gamezebo	4.5/5
IGN	7.8/10
MacLife	5/5
Pocket Gamer	9/10
TouchArcade	5/5
148Apps	4.5/5
AppSpy	5/5
Digital Spy	4/5

The iOS version of Asphalt 8 holds an aggregate score of 91 out of 100 on Metacritic based on 18 reviews.

The game received generally positive reviews upon release. Eric Ford of TouchArcade reviewed the graphics and jump-focused gameplay positively, while noting that the highest-tier vehicles required significant in-game currency or time to acquire. James Gilmour of AppSpy wrote that the game combined mechanics from previous arcade racing series such as Out Run, Ridge Racer, and Burnout. Andrew Hayward of MacLife stated that the game improved upon Asphalt 7 and compared its multiplayer functionality to Real Racing 3.

Andrew Stevens of 148Apps scored it 4.5 out of 5, writing that the addition of ramps and stunts took the series in a new direction. Gamezebo's David Oxford also rated the game 4.5 out of 5, citing the graphics, car selection, level design, and use of licensed music as positive elements, while criticizing the drifting mechanics. Pocket Gamer's Harry Slater scored it 9 out of 10 with a Gold Award, contrasting its arcade gameplay with the simulation style of Real Racing 3 and discussing the track design and nitro system.

IGN's Steve Watts was more critical, scoring the game 7.8 out of 10. He noted the high quality of the graphics and gameplay but objected to the in-app purchase system, writing that the game's pacing was "slowed by aggressive gating" that pushed players toward microtransactions, and that the later-season car requirements were restrictive.
