= Asphalt 3: Street Rules =

2006 video game

- Cover art featuring a Lamborghini Murciélago
- Developer: Gameloft Shanghai
- Publisher: Gameloft
- Director: Stanislas Dewavrin
- Producers: Jean-Nicolas Vernin, Gao Xiang
- Designers: Michaël Janod, Yu Liang, Zhao Qin
- Series: Asphalt
- Platforms: J2ME; Windows Mobile; Symbian (N-Gage 2.0); Android
- Release: J2ME: WW: October 2006; 3D Version: WW: March 2007; N-Gage 2.0: WW: April 3, 2008; Android: WW: 2009
- Genre: Racing

Asphalt 3: Street Rules is a racing video game developed by Gameloft Shanghai and the third major game of the Asphalt series following Asphalt: Urban GT 2. It was released in 2006 on Java-based mobile phones, followed by a 3D version in 2007 on other mobile phones and was also released in 2008 for Nokia's N-Gage 2.0 platform and in 2009 for Android. It was notably the first mobile game to be played at the World Cyber Games competition.

== Gameplay ==
Asphalt 3: Street Rules gameplay screenshot (3D version, Java)

Events include:

- Race: The player starts from the bottom of the grid and competes against seven other racers, with the main objective of finishing first at the end of three laps, while avoiding police cruisers and road blocks.
- Duel: A "one-on-one" race where the player must catch up with and overtake the sole opponent to finish first at the end of two laps to win.
- Beat'em all: In this mode, the player's objective is to crash a certain number of rival racing cars or police cars before the end of the third lap.
- Cop Chase: This mode features the racer taking the role of a cop, and with the objective of crashing the boss racer, without harming the other racers and the civilian cars. The player starts with $30,000 cash and loses money every time they cause "collateral damage".
- Cash Attack: This mode is similar to the normal race, except with the added objective of earning as much money as possible, through illegal acts like Drifts, Overspeeding and Takedowns.

The gameplay includes an "Instant Race" mode, where the player is placed in a random city's race with any one of the player's owned cars, and a "Career" mode, which is the heart of the game. The player starts with a Mini Cooper S and has the option of unlocking 11 other sports cars and bikes, each with their own tuning. The initial game ends when the player has finished all of the races with a podium finish. The final end comes when the player has achieved a 'Gold' in all of the events, and is thus declared the best in the 'underground racing league'. Even after completing the career mode, the player can still take part in any of the events to earn more money.

To be disqualified from a race means that the player fails to finish the race even though all the other racers have finished the race. When the player is disqualified, their vehicle is wrecked and they earn the least amount or no amount of credits possible.

In Asphalt 3: Street Rules, the cop chase race type strictly forbids wrecking of any type and will immediately disqualify the player if they wreck.

== Reception ==
Pocket Gamer's Stuart Dredge in 2006 scored the Java version 4 out of 5, calling it a "Top-notch racing romp that's more fun and much faster than ever." Levi Buchanan of IGN scored it 8 out of 10, calling it a "sexy racer that offers some real high-speed thrills. The amount of content in the game makes it an exceptional value, too." The 3D version of Asphalt 3: Street Rules was given a score of 3.5 out of 5 by Craig Poole of Pocket Gamer. He noted that the game was more arcadey and drifty compared to the mobile versions of Need for Speed: Carbon and Project Gotham Racing.

The later N-Gage 2.0 version of the game was reviewed by Stuart Dredge of Pocket Gamer who gave 4 out of 5, praising the speed and visuals. Joseph Hanlon of CNET reviewed the N-Gage 2.0 version and scored it 5.5 out of 10, praising gameplay and soundtrack but critical of level designs and mechanics. All About N-Gage gave a score of 80%, saying it is "a fun and playable game with accessible gameplay, a good selection of game modes, nice sound and nice (though sometimes a bit too jerky) graphics".

In September 2008, it was reported that Asphalt 3: Street Rules was up to that point "one of the biggest hits" of Nokia's N-Gage platform.
