= Asphalt 6: Adrenaline =

2010 racing video game

- Cover art featuring the Pagani Zonda Cinque
- Developer: Gameloft Montreal
- Publisher: Gameloft
- Series: Asphalt
- Platforms: iOS, OS X, Android, Symbian^3, Java 2 ME, WebOS, BlackBerry Tablet OS, Bada 2.0, Series 30+
- Release: iOS: WW: December 21, 2010; OS X: NA: February 17, 2011; Android: WW: June 15, 2011; Symbian^3: WW: July 20, 2011; Java 2 ME: WW: August 31, 2011; webOS: WW: September 3, 2011; BlackBerry Tablet OS: WW: October 12, 2011; Bada: WW: January 10, 2012; Series 30+: WW: 2014
- Genre: Racing
- Modes: Single-player, multiplayer

Asphalt 6: Adrenaline is a racing video game developed by Gameloft Montreal, published by Gameloft and was the sixth major game of Asphalt series. It was released for iOS on December 21, 2010, for Mac OS X on February 17, 2011, for Android on June 15, for Symbian^3 on July 20, for Mobile phones on August 31, for webOS on September 3, for BlackBerry PlayBook on October 12, and for Bada 2.0 on January 10, 2012.

== Gameplay ==
Gameplay in Asphalt 6: Adrenaline is similar to that in Asphalt 5, with the player given the option of either tilting the device or touching the side of the screen to steer. The game also has a multiplayer mode, both local through Wi-Fi and Bluetooth, and global through an internet connection.

The player can acquire up to five stars for each race, with their performance based on conditions set prior to the race concerning both primary and secondary objectives, such as knocking down a certain number of opponents or drifting for a certain amount of time.

Gameplay in Asphalt 6. The player in a KTM X-Bow is currently in "adrenaline mode", hence the blue tint.

A new feature in Asphalt 6 is the "Adrenaline mode", which is achieved by hitting nitro while the meter is full. While in Adrenaline mode, the player's car becomes virtually indestructible, also gaining the ability to easily wreck opponents upon the slightest contact.

=== Events ===
The game consists of a variety of events:

- "Normal Race": a traditional two-to-three-lap race where the player starts from the bottom of the grid, with the objective of finishing 3rd or better
- "Beat'em All": the player must knockdown as many opponents as possible within the time limit
- "Elimination": the player must avoid placing last in a 30-second period, as the last-placed racer is eliminated when the timer runs out; the last racer running is the winner
- "Time Attack": the player is the only racer, and must complete a set number of laps before the timer runs out
- "Drift": similar to Time Attack mode, but with the objective of drifting for a given amount of time
- "Duel": a one-on-one race with a computer-controlled racer, where the player must finish 1st to win
- "Collector": the player's objective is to collect a given number of items before the timer runs out
- "Under Pressure" (not available in the Java version): the player must finish the race while fending off the opponents, who try to knock the player down
- "Wanted" (only available in the Java version): the player must complete a certain number of laps without getting stopped by the police or hitting any road blocks

== Java and Series 30+ version ==
The Java and Series 30+ version of Asphalt 6 for mobile phones consists of a slightly different gameplay style. Here, the game consists of a "Free Play" mode, as well as a "Career" mode, where the player must race their way across a number of leagues, winning all the races and additional challenges in each one, so as to ultimately become "The Lord of Asphalt", as the game reaches 100% completion.

== Reception ==
Asphalt 6: Adrenaline
(iOS version)

Aggregate scores
Aggregator	Score
GameRankings	82%
Metacritic	79/100

Review scores
Publication	Score
IGN	7.5/10
148 Apps	4.5/5
Pocket Gamer	9/10
Slide to Play	3/4

Upon its release, Asphalt 6: Adrenaline received generally favorable reviews. The iOS version holds an aggregate score 79 out of 100 on Metacritic, based on thirteen reviews, and 82% on GameRankings, based on six reviews.

Pocket Gamer's Keith Andrew scored the game 9 out of 10, arguing that the overall gameplay is second-to-none; "It's when all [the] elements come together – boosting, burning, and bashing into other racers – that Asphalt 6 really finds its rhythm, delivering the kind of heart-hammering experience usually confined to racers adorning the big screen in your living room. But that's because Gameloft has no limits when it comes to Asphalt 6: Adrenaline. Mobile or not, the game's efforts to marry the exploits of every racing franchise under the sun ends up delivering an experience that outstrips almost all of them."

Felix Xiao of AppAdvice had a similar reaction, praising the graphics and concluding "if you're looking for an action-packed racer to pass the time, then look no further. Asphalt 6 will provide you with all that plus much more for only a few dollars. Greatly improved artwork, another set of fantastic rides, and a massive amount of gameplay almost guarantee that you won't ever get enough. For $6.99, Asphalt 6 is a must buy that will likely remain the best arcade racing game for some time."

Chris Hall of 148Apps also reacted positively, awarding a score of 4.5 out of 5, and praising the feel of the game; "when you are going fast in Asphalt 6, it feels like you are going really fast. The engine explodes in sound at high RPM's and the adrenaline boosts (turbo) look like they are straight out of Tron. Crazy speed effects do make the game quite entertaining, but don't go in thinking that you are going to be looking at the next Real Racing 2 [...] There is no question that racing fans will get a kick out of Asphalt 6, but fans of arcade racers will love it just a bit more. The graphics are solid, the sound is good, the driving mechanics are exciting (maybe a bit too forgiving for racing sim fans), and the game is just plain fun. If you like these kinds of games, you definitely won't regret your purchase."

IGN's Levi Buchanan was slightly less impressed, awarding the game a score of 7.5 out of 10, and praising the graphics and controls, but arguing that the Asphalt series has become somewhat predictable; "Asphalt 6: Adrenaline is a fun arcade racer with a bunch of cars and tracks. If all you want is speed and exotic locations, this is the game for you. But let's be honest, the Asphalt series is starting to get really familiar. Though it's still reliable fun, the series needs to do something next time other than just offer more and more."

Slide to Play's Andrew Podolsky was of a similar mind to IGN, feeling the series itself has become stagnant and scoring the game 3 out of 4 (the same score he had awarded Asphalt 5); "Gameloft's got us in a bit of a bind. Their games consistently push the technical limits of the iPhone, with each new iteration in a long-running series like Asphalt looking and sounding better than the one before. But without a bit more creativity, the Asphalt series is starting to feel like it's stuck in second gear. The sixth Asphalt game (and the third on the iPhone) is another brilliant technical achievement. The environments are each detailed, colorful, and distinctive, and we detected almost no graphical pop-in or frame rate slowdown when we played on a 4th generation iPod Touch. At the same time, it's not the huge leap we saw from Asphalt 4 to Asphalt 5 [...] What's really missing from Asphalt 6: Adrenaline is not the graphical flair or well-balanced gameplay progression. Gameloft has found a way to churn out iPhone games that can look as good and feel as viscerally exciting as Hollywood blockbusters. But like those blockbusters, we are sometimes left looking at a product that lacks basic creativity. With basically the same events as the last game, there's very little incentive to buy this year's Asphalt."
