= Ferrari GT: Evolution =

2008 video game

- Developer: Gameloft Bucharest
- Designer: Adrian Dorobat
- Series: Ferrari GT
- Platforms: iOS mobile NDSi; Symbian OS
- Release: iOS; December 8, 2008; Mobile; December 25, 2008; Nintendo DSi; April 26, 2010
- Genre: Racing game
- Modes: Single-player, multiplayer

Ferrari GT: Evolution is a racing game by Gameloft Bucharest released on iOS on December 8, 2008, DSIWare on April 26, 2010 and, is based on 33 different cars on iOS and 26 different cars on Mobile, all manufactured by Ferrari. Races take place on the Fiorano Circuit and seven imaginary road circuits, each based on an actual city.

== Gameplay ==
There are two game modes: Quick Race where the player chooses the car, racing location, and race type; and Career mode, where the player participates in trials, friendly competitions, adversarial challenges, and scheduled racing competitions.
