= Freebox =

Set-top box and home gateway supplied by the French ISP Free

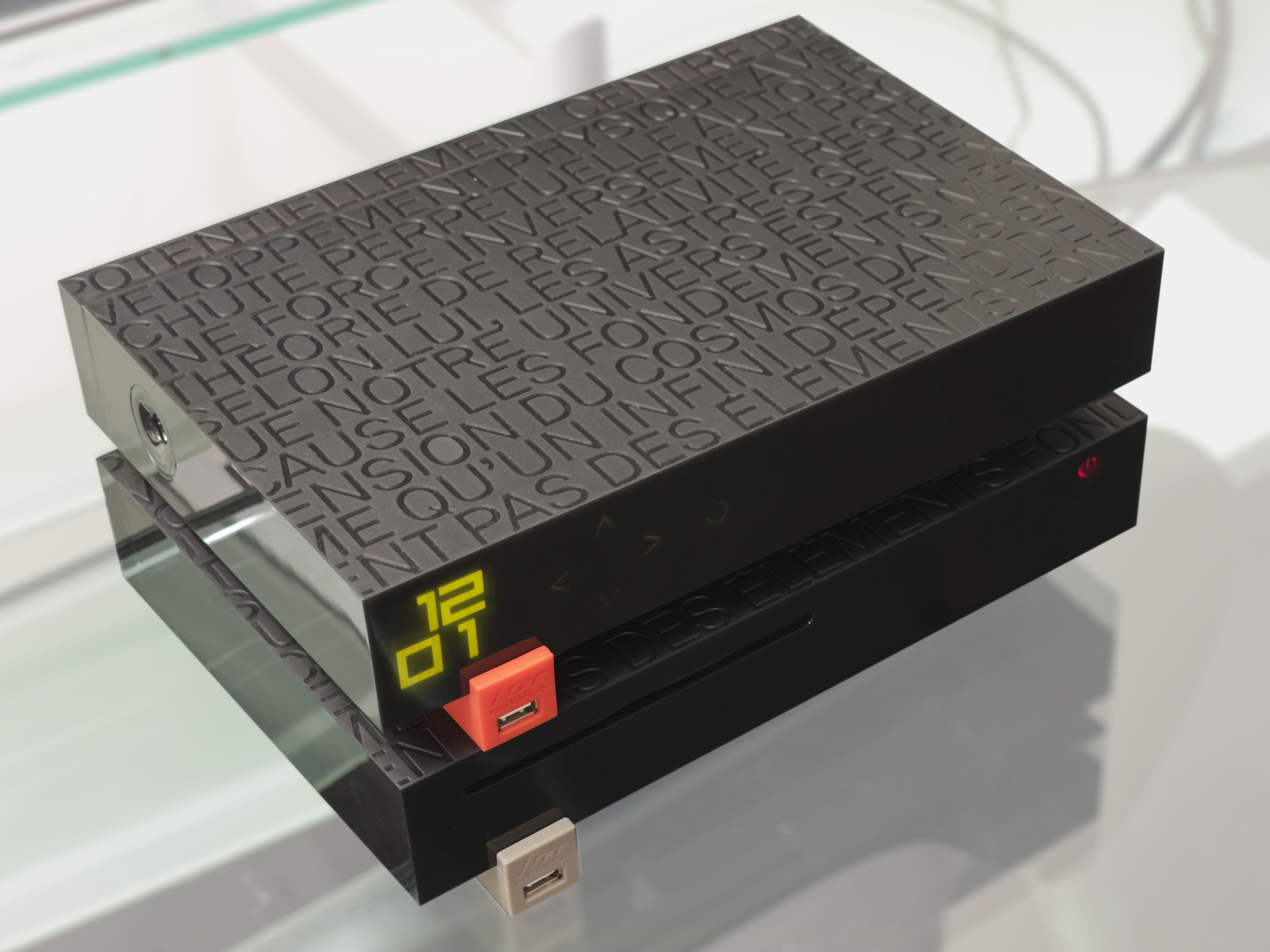
- The Freebox Révolution (V6): Freebox Server on top, Freebox Player below
- Developer: Freebox SAS (Free)
- Manufacturer: Freebox SAS
- Type: Residential gateway and set-top box
- Released: September 2002
- Operating system: Linux-based; Android TV on recent players
- Connectivity: ADSL, VDSL, FTTH, Wi-Fi, Ethernet

The Freebox is the residential gateway and set-top box supplied by the French Internet service provider Free, a subsidiary of Iliad, to its broadband subscribers. Designed in-house by a small team of engineers from 2000 and first distributed in 2002, it was one of the first devices in the world to combine Internet access, voice over IP telephony and television over a single broadband line, a bundle known as triple play. Its success led most other French providers to market comparable equipment under names ending in "box", such as Orange's Livebox.

The Freebox acts as a modem for DSL or fibre connections, as a router and Wi-Fi access point, and as a television decoder. It remains the property of Free and is lent to subscribers for the duration of their contract. Since 2002 it has gone through nine main generations, from the original Freebox to the Freebox Ultra launched in 2024. The name Freebox is also used for the group's research and development subsidiary, Freebox SAS.

== History ==
=== Origins (2000–2001) ===
In late summer 2000, Xavier Niel, the founder of Free, travelled to Silicon Valley for a week with three of his colleagues, the network engineer Rani Assaf, the future chief executive Michaël Boukobza and Pierre Gohon. They visited around twenty companies, including Cisco, Next Level Communications and Google, looking for a single device able to deliver broadband Internet, television and telephony to subscribers' homes. None of the manufacturers they met offered such equipment, as American companies were mainly developing technologies for cable networks rather than for the French telephone network.

During a visit to Universal Studios, Niel suggested that Free build the device itself, an idea that earned him the nickname "fer à souder" ("soldering iron") within the company. Assaf offered to write the software and to entrust the hardware to Sébastien Boutruche, a classmate from his engineering school then working for Sagem. The subsidiary Freebox SAS was incorporated on 18 December 2000. Its first engineers, poorly paid by industry standards, each received a small stake in the new company. The team took apart competitors' equipment to understand how it worked, while Assaf continued to build Free's network during the day and developed the box's software at night. A first prototype, never distributed, was completed in 2001; it was shown to executives of the broadcaster TF1, whom Niel unsuccessfully tried to bring into the project.

=== Launch and triple play (2002–2003) ===
On 19 September 2002, Free launched an unlimited ADSL offer at 512 kbit/s for €29.99 a month, well below the €45 charged by most competitors; the first Freebox was delivered to subscribers the following month. The price remained that of Free's main offer for eight years. The first model suffered from several defects, including an undersized power supply, which were corrected in a second version released in 2003.

Niel's aim was to differentiate Free from other alternative operators, which all resold the same access to France Télécom's network through local-loop unbundling, by adding telephony and television to Internet access. In July 2003, Free added unlimited voice-over-IP calls to French landlines, usable with an ordinary telephone handset, and in late 2003 it launched a television service over ADSL, initially available in 176 towns and cities. (Note: The Italian operator Fastweb also offered Internet, telephone and television services over fibre from 2001.) The video encoding was handled by Christophe Massiot, one of the original developers of the VLC media player.

=== Expansion (2004–2009) ===
Free became the first operator in the world to offer television over DSL on a large scale. In 2008, Light Reading ranked it first among the world's IPTV providers by number of subscribers. At the end of June 2005, more than 1.1 million subscribers were equipped with a Freebox. Competing triple-play offers only took off after the creation of Neuf Cegetel in 2005 and the regrouping of France Télécom's consumer services under the Orange brand in 2006.

The device evolved with each version. The Freebox V3, released in 2004, was much smaller and added a front display and router functions; the V4, introduced in mid-2004, added a USB host port and support for ADSL2+, which Free began offering in October 2004. In April 2006, the Freebox V5 split the device into two units: a network box providing Internet access, Wi-Fi and telephony, and a separate multimedia box, the Freebox HD, with a hard disk for recording and time-shifting, high-definition output and a digital terrestrial tuner. A variant for fibre subscribers, the Freebox Optique, followed with the launch of Free's FTTH offers.

=== Freebox Révolution and Mini 4K (2010–2017) ===
On 14 December 2010, Niel presented the Freebox Révolution (V6), the result of about three years of development, two of them with the designer Philippe Starck. Its Freebox Server unit combined a modem, router, network storage on a 250 GB hard disk, while the Freebox Player included a Blu-ray drive, a web browser and a games controller. The new package added unlimited calls to French mobile phones and brought the first price increase for Free's main offer since 2002, to €35.98 a month for subscribers choosing the new box, while the previous offer remained on sale at €29.99. In June 2013, the Freebox Crystal replaced the Freebox HD with a new design and television interface, at the same price as the previous basic offer.

In March 2015, Free introduced the Freebox Mini 4K, a smaller unit running Android TV and presented as the first triple-play offer in the world compatible with Ultra HD.

=== Delta, One and Pop (2018–2023) ===
After several years of delays, the seventh generation was unveiled on 4 December 2018 in two versions. The Freebox Delta supported fibre speeds of up to 10 Gbit/s, combined DSL with 4G in rural areas and came with a player including speakers developed by Devialet, the Amazon Alexa voice assistant, home-automation and alarm functions and a Netflix subscription, for €49.99 a month. Unlike earlier models, the Devialet player was not lent but sold for €480, payable in instalments. The consumer association UFC-Que Choisir criticised the presentation of the offer, noting that the advertised speed was limited to 8 Gbit/s in practice, and obtained changes to the way prices and fees were displayed. The entry-level Freebox One combined the server and player functions in a single, modular unit.

The Freebox One was withdrawn from sale in July 2020 and replaced by the Freebox Pop (V8), launched on 7 July 2020. Offered without commitment at €39.99 a month, or €29.99 in the first year, it provided fibre speeds of up to 5 Gbit/s, an Android TV player compatible with 4K and a new television interface, OQee.

=== Freebox Ultra (2024–present) ===
On 30 January 2024, Free introduced the Freebox Ultra (V9), offering symmetric fibre speeds of up to 8 Gbit/s and the first Wi-Fi 7 support on the French market, for €49.99 a month in the first year with several streaming services included. At the same time, Free reorganised its range around the Freebox Révolution Light, the Freebox Pop, the Freebox Ultra and a cheaper Freebox Ultra Essentiel without bundled services, and stopped selling the Freebox Delta. A fibre-only Freebox Pop S without a television box followed in April 2025, and a 5G box for homes without fibre was launched in December 2024. The Freebox Crystal and Freebox One were switched off on 31 December 2025, their remaining users being offered migration to newer models.

== Models ==
Generation	Model	Launch	Main features
V1–V2	Freebox	September 2002	ADSL modem with television and telephony ports
V3–V4	Freebox	2004	Smaller casing, front display, router, ADSL2+ (V4)
V5	Freebox HD and network box	April 2006	Two separate units, HD television, hard disk recorder, DTT tuner
V5	Freebox Crystal	June 2013	New design and television interface
V6	Freebox Révolution	December 2010	Design by Philippe Starck, NAS, Blu-ray player
V6	Freebox Mini 4K	March 2015	Android TV, 4K Ultra HD
V7	Freebox Delta / One	December 2018	10 Gbit/s fibre, Devialet speakers, Alexa (Delta); single unit (One)
V8	Freebox Pop	July 2020	Up to 5 Gbit/s, Android TV 4K player, OQee interface
V9	Freebox Ultra	January 2024	Symmetric 8 Gbit/s fibre, Wi-Fi 7

== Features ==
=== Network ===
The Freebox works as a modem for ADSL, VDSL or fibre connections, and as a router with a built-in Ethernet switch. From 2007 it supported IPv6, deployed across Free's network using the IPv6 rapid deployment mechanism. Since 2009, Freebox units have also acted by default as public Wi-Fi hotspots, forming the FreeWifi community network, which is reserved for Free subscribers and isolated from the user's own network. The Freebox Ultra and Pop S support Wi-Fi 7. The Freebox Ultra includes an "eco Wi-Fi" mode that switches off unused Wi-Fi bands and a total standby mode intended to reduce energy consumption.

=== Television ===
The Freebox provides access to Free's IPTV service, including live channels, catch-up television, video on demand and recording on the box's hard disk or on external storage. Channel access rights are managed without a smart card, through the Access Right Distribution Protocol (ARDP) developed by Free and submitted to the Internet Engineering Task Force. Players from the Mini 4K onwards run Android TV, giving access to third-party streaming applications.

=== Telephony ===
The Freebox provides a voice-over-IP telephone line usable with a standard handset, with unlimited calls to landlines in France and many foreign countries, and since 2010 to French mobile phones. From 2007, subscribers could also send and receive faxes through an online service linked to the box.

=== Software ===
The Freebox runs a Linux-based operating system developed by Free, updated remotely to add features over time.
