= Global network =

Communication network covering the Earth

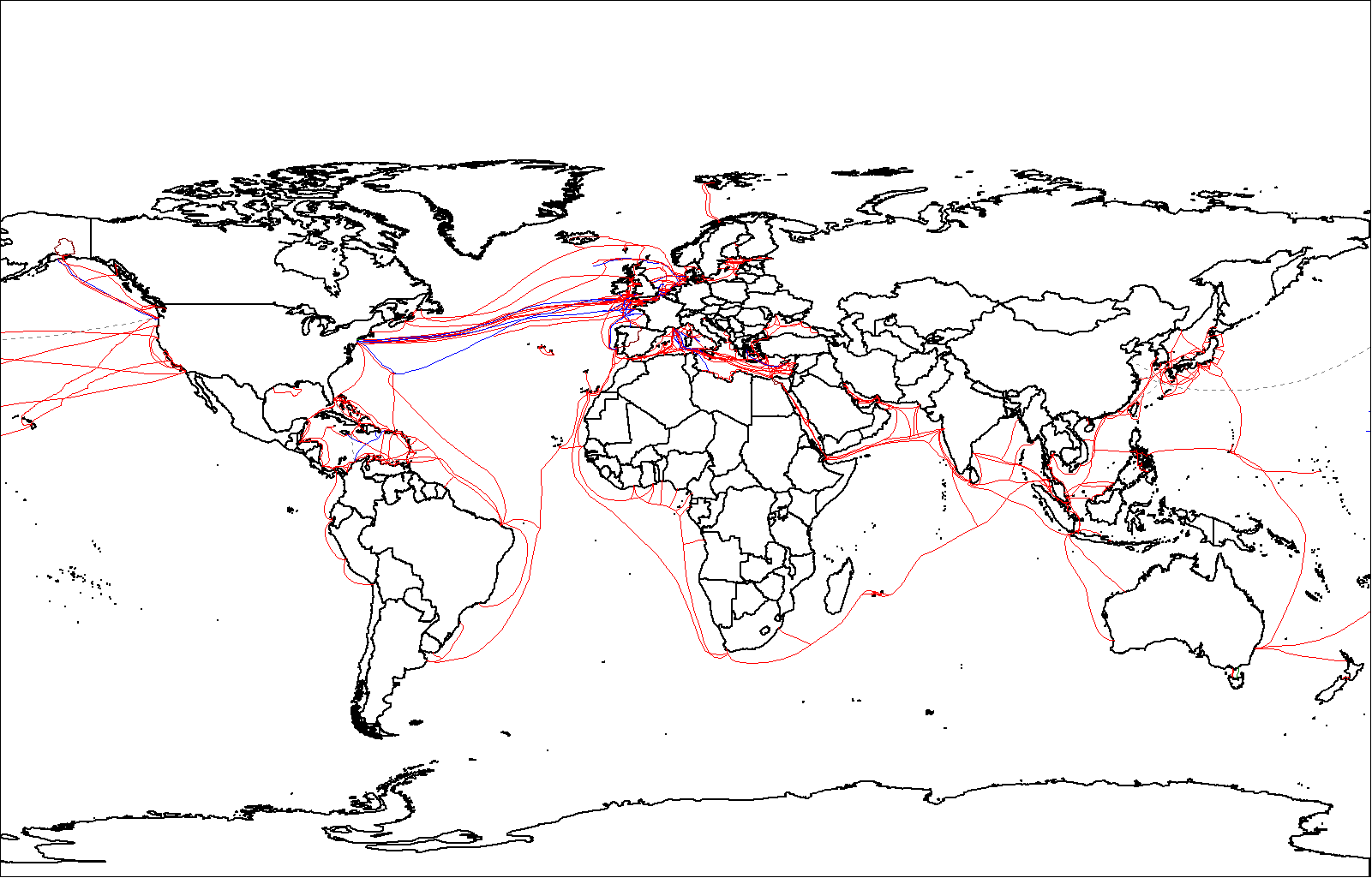
Global submarine cables in 2007

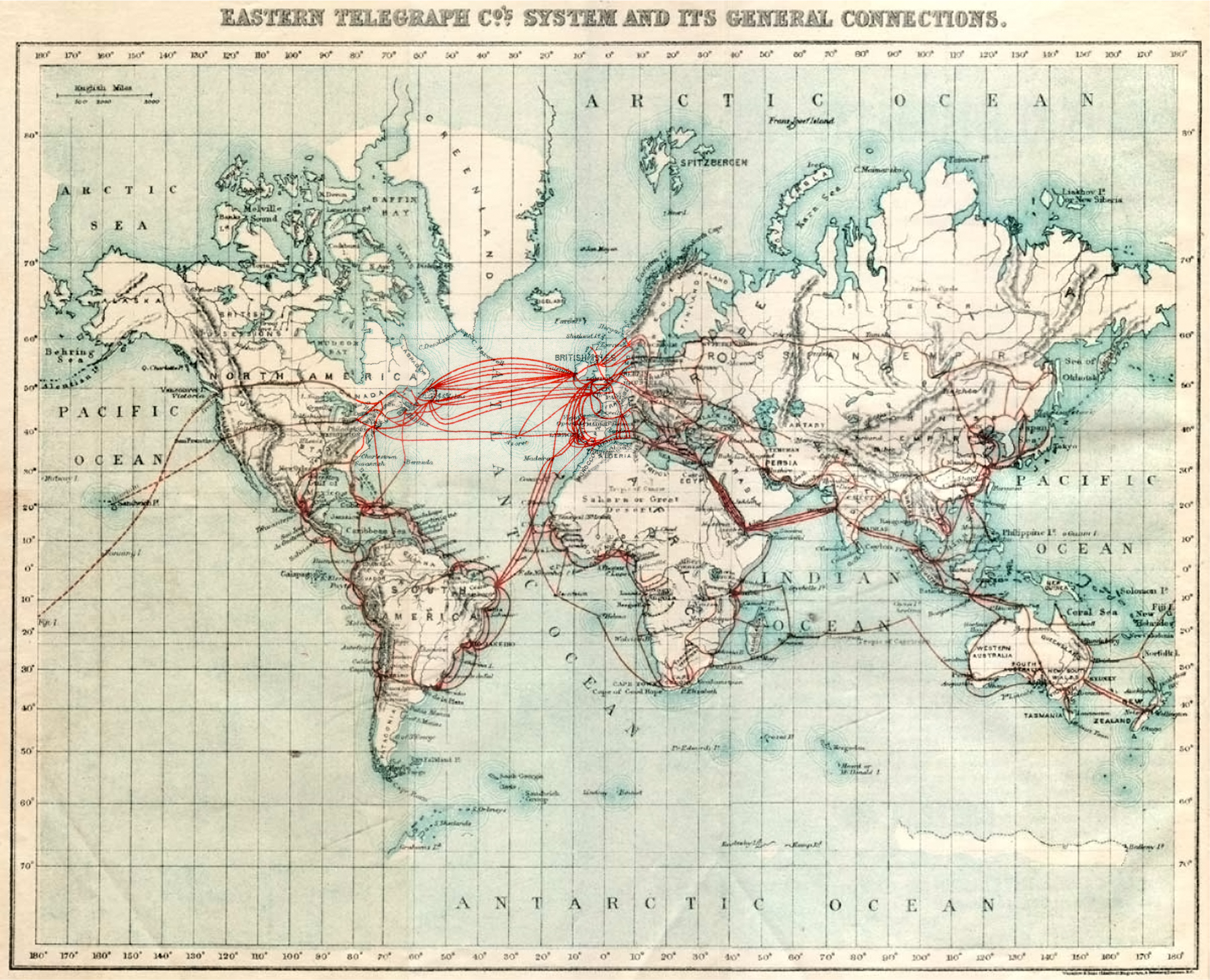
Eastern Telegraph cable network in 1901

A global network is any communication network that spans the entire Earth. The term, as used in this article, refers in a more restricted way to bidirectional communication networks based on technology. Early networks such as international mail and unidirectional communication networks, such as radio and television, are described elsewhere.

The first global network was established using electrical telegraphy and global span was achieved in 1899. The telephony network was the second to achieve global status, in the 1950s. More recently, interconnected IP networks (principally the Internet, with estimated 2.5 billion users worldwide in 2014), and the GSM mobile communication network (with over 6 billion worldwide users in 2014) form the largest global networks of all.

Setting up global networks requires immensely costly and lengthy efforts lasting for decades. Elaborate interconnections, switching and routing devices, laying out physical carriers of information, such as land and submarine cables and earth stations must be set in operation. In addition, international communication protocols, legislation and agreements are involved.

Global networks might also refer to networks of individuals (such as scientists), communities (such as cities) and organizations (such as civil organizations) worldwide which, for instance, might have formed for the management, mitigation and resolution of global issues.

== Satellite global networks ==
Communication satellites are an important part of global networks. However, there are specific low Earth orbit (LEO) global satellite constellations, such as Iridium, Globalstar and Orbcomm, which are comprised by dozens of similar satellites which are put in orbit at regularly spaced positions and form a mesh network, sometimes sending and receiving information directly among themselves. Using VSAT technology, satellite internet access has become possible.

== Mobile wireless networks ==
It is estimated that 80% of the global mobile market uses the GSM standard, present in more than 212 countries and territories. Its ubiquity makes international roaming very common between mobile phone operators, enabling subscribers to use their phones in many parts of the world. In order to achieve this, these networks must be interconnected by way of peering arrangements, and therefore the GSM network is a truly global one.

== Network interconnection ==
The telegraph and telex communication networks have been phased out, so interconnection among existing global networks arise at several points, such as between the voice telephony and digital data networks, and between these and satellite networks. Many applications run now on several networks, such as VoIP (voice over IP). Mobile communication (voice and data) networks are also intimately intertwined, because the majority of 21st century cell phones have both voice and data (internet navigation and emailing) capabilities.

Digital global networks require huge carrying capacity in the main backbones. This is currently achieved by fiber-optic cables.

== Social and economic impact ==
The Canadian sociologist Marshall McLuhan was the first to forecast the huge impact of the matrix of global networks upon society, coining the term global village. His work, however, related to radio and television networks, which are broadcast (unidirectional) networks, thus predating the much larger impact of the internet.

Global networks have revolutionized human communication several times. The first to do so was the electrical telegraph. Its impact was so large that it has been dubbed the Victorian Internet. It was expanded many times in its coverage with the advent of radiotelegraphy, and with text messaging using telex machines.

The Internet and mobile communication networks have made possible entirely new forms of social interaction, activities and organizing, thanks to its basic features such as widespread usability and access, and instant communication from any connected point to another. Thus, its social impact has been, and still is, enormous. Finally, the impact on governance have been significant facilitating the emergence of 'transnational policy networks'

== See also ==
- History of telecommunication
  - History of the Internet
  - History of radio
  - History of television
  - History of the telephone
  - History of telegraphy
- Mobile telecommunications
- Computer networking
- Communication protocol
- Network architecture
- Global network positioning
- Quantum Internet
- Telephony
- Fiber-optic cable
- Telegraphy
