= Asphalt 4: Elite Racing =

2008 video game

- Game thumbnail featuring a Bugatti Veyron
- Developer: Gameloft Paris
- Publisher: Gameloft
- Series: Asphalt
- Platforms: iPod, iOS, N-Gage 2.0 (Symbian), BlackBerry OS, DSiWare (Nintendo DSi), Windows Mobile, J2ME (Java)
- Release: July 5, 2008: iOS, iPod; EU: August 28, 2008; NA: September 10, 2008; AU: October 26, 2008 N-Gage; NA: January 20, 2009; EU: February 7, 2009 BlackBerry; NA: April 2, 2009; EU: April 19, 2009 Nintendo DSi; EU: June 12, 2009; NA: July 6, 2009; JP: August 5, 2009; AU: September 9, 2009 J2ME; NA: July 5, 2008; EU: July 27, 2008
- Genre: Racing

Asphalt 4: Elite Racing is a 2008 racing game published and developed by Gameloft. The fourth major game of the Asphalt series and the followup to Asphalt 3: Street Rules (2006), it was released on Java mobile phones in July 2008 followed by iOS and iPod on August 28, 2008, then in 2009 was also released on N-Gage 2.0, Nintendo's DSiWare, BlackBerry OS and Windows Mobile.

== Gameplay ==
The main gameplay involves the player starting out with two of the most basic cars (Mini Cooper S and Nissan GT-R) and earning money by winning races and performing illegal acts. Money can then be spent on upgrades or new cars. Game modes include Beat 'em All, where the player has to destroy the cars of as many rival racers as possible, and Cop Chase, where they switch roles as a police officer trying to catch the leading car of an illegal street race.

== Reception ==
Reception

Aggregate scores
Aggregator	Score
GameRankings	iOS: 90% DSi: 78%
Metacritic	DSi: 78/100

Review scores
Publication	Score
IGN	DSi: 7.8/10 Mobile: 9/10
Nintendo Life	DSi: 8/10
Pocket Gamer	N-Gage: 4/5 Mobile: 3.5/5

Asphalt 4: Elite Racing received "generally favorable reviews" according to the review aggregator Metacritic.

IGN praised Asphalt 4's graphics, calling it "the best-looking iPhone game as of yet" and highlighting the game's production value. They further called attention to the game's performance, gameplay, and multiplayer.

It received over 30 million downloads from the App Store.
