= 2007 in video games =

2007 saw many new installments in established video game franchises, such as Madden NFL 08, NBA Live 08, NBA 2K8, Tony Hawk's Proving Ground, WWE Smackdown vs. Raw 2008, Super Mario Galaxy, Call of Duty 4: Modern Warfare, Halo 3, God of War II, Team Fortress 2, Trauma Center: New Blood, Metroid Prime 3: Corruption, Final Fantasy Tactics: War of the Lions, Guitar Hero III: Legends of Rock, Half-Life 2: Episode Two, and Lego Star Wars: The Complete Saga. New intellectual properties included Assassin's Creed, BioShock, Crackdown, Crysis, Mass Effect, Portal, Rock Band, Skate, The Darkness, The Witcher, and Uncharted.

The year has been retrospectively considered one of the best and most influential in video game history due to the release of numerous critically acclaimed, commercially successful and influential titles across all platforms and genres at the time and remarked the birth of new video game franchises. The year's best-selling video game console was the Nintendo DS. The year's most critically acclaimed title was Super Mario Galaxy, which is ranked Metacritic's fifth highest-scoring game of all time. The year's best-selling home video game worldwide was Wii Sports for the Wii, and other critically acclaimed titles such as BioShock, The Orange Box, Call of Duty 4: Modern Warfare and Halo 3.

== Legend ==
Video game platforms
DS	Nintendo DS, DSiWare, iQue DS	GBA	Game Boy Advance, iQue GBA	GCN	GameCube
iOS	iOS, iPhone, iPod, iPadOS, iPad, visionOS, Apple Vision Pro	LIN	Linux, SteamOS	MOBI	Mobile phone
OSX	macOS	PS2	PlayStation 2	PS3	PlayStation 3
PSN	PlayStation Network	PSP	PlayStation Portable	Wii	Wii, WiiWare, Wii Virtual Console
WIN	Windows, all versions Windows 95 and up	XB360	Xbox 360, Xbox 360 Live Arcade	XB	Xbox, Xbox Live Arcade

== Financial performance ==
=== Best-selling hardware by region ===
- Japan sales data based on figures from Enterbrain
- North America sales data based on figures from the NPD Group
- Europe sales data based on estimates from Electronic Arts

Video game console sales of 2007
Rank	Console	Units sold			
Rank	Console	Japan	North America	Europe	Combined
1	DS	7,143,702	8,500,000	8,700,000	24,343,702
2	Wii	3,629,361	6,290,000	4,800,000	14,719,361
3	PSP	3,022,659	3,820,000	3,100,000	9,942,659
4	PS2	816,419	3,970,000	3,800,000	8,586,419
5	XB360	257,841	4,620,000	1,900,000	6,777,841
6	PS3	1,206,347	2,560,000	2,800,000	6,566,347

=== Best-selling games by region ===
Worldwide

Top 10 best-selling games of 2007 worldwide
Rank	Title	Sales	Platform(s)	Publisher(s)	Genre	Ref
1	Wii Sports	15,246,786	Wii	Nintendo	Sports	(Note: Wii Sports sales: 2006 – 2,603,214; Japan – 553,214; Overseas – 2.05 million; 2006–2007 – 17.85 million)
2	Pokémon Diamond / Pearl	9,867,185	DS	Nintendo, Pokémon Company	RPG	(Note: Pokémon Diamond and Pearl sales: 2006 – 4,302,815; 2006–2007 – 14.17 million)
3	Halo 3	8,100,000	XB360	Microsoft Game Studios	FPS	
4	Wii Play	7,316,815	Wii	Nintendo	Party	(Note: Wii Play sales in 2007: January–March (Japan) – 706,815; April–December – 6.61 million)
5	Call of Duty 4: Modern Warfare	7,000,000	PS3 / XB360 / WIN	Activision	FPS	
6	FIFA 08	6,550,000		EA Sports	Sports	
7	Pro Evolution Soccer 2008	6,370,000		Konami	Sports	
8	Brain Age 2: More Training in Minutes a Day!	6,091,362	DS	Nintendo	Edutainment	(Note: Brain Age 2 (Motto No wo Kitaeru Otona no DS Training) sales in 2007: January–March – 551,362; April–December – 5.54 million)
9	Super Mario Galaxy	5,190,000	Wii	Nintendo	Platformer	
10	Mario Party 8	4,350,000	Wii	Nintendo	Party	

Japan

- Based on figures from Enterbrain:

Best-selling video games of 2007 in Japan
Place	Title	Console	Units sold
1	Wii Sports	Wii	1,911,520
2	Monster Hunter Portable 2	PSP	1,489,898
3	Wii Play	Wii	1,487,484
4	Pokémon Mystery Dungeon: Explorers of Time and Explorers of Darkness	DS	1,256,516
5	Mario Party DS	DS	1,232,644
6	New Super Mario Bros.	DS	1,176,939
7	Pokémon Diamond and Pearl	DS	1,094,389
8	Mario Party 8	Wii	1,053,934
9	Dragon Quest IV: Chapters of the Chosen	DS	1,052,827
10	Brain Age 2: More Training in Minutes a Day!	DS	1,033,933

United States

- Based on figures from the NPD Group:

Best-selling video games of 2007 in the US
Place	Title	Console	Units sold
1	Halo 3	XB360	4.82 million
2	Wii Play	Wii	4.12 million
3	Call of Duty 4: Modern Warfare	XB360	3.04 million
4	Guitar Hero III: Legends of Rock with guitar	PS2	2.72 million
5	Super Mario Galaxy	Wii	2.52 million
6	Pokémon Diamond	DS	2.48 million
7	Madden NFL 08	PS2	1.90 million
8	Guitar Hero II with guitar	PS2	1.89 million
9	Assassin's Creed	XB360	1.87 million
10	Mario Party 8	Wii	1.82 million

United Kingdom

- Based on figures from Chart-Track

Best-selling video games of 2007 in the UK
Place	Title	Publisher	Units sold
1	FIFA 08	Electronic Arts	1,391,435
2	Dr Kawashima's Brain Training: How Old is Your Brain?	Nintendo	1,016,558
3	Call of Duty 4: Modern Warfare	Activision	935,044
4	Pro Evolution Soccer 2008	Konami	787,382
5	More Brain Training from Dr Kawashima	Nintendo	760,225
6	Halo 3	Microsoft	735,176
7	The Simpsons Game	Electronic Arts	734,595
8	Wii Play	Nintendo	688,002
9	Assassin's Creed	Ubisoft	670,286
10	WWE SmackDown vs. Raw 2008	THQ	563,121

== Best-selling video games per platform by region ==
=== North America ===
- Based on figures from the NPD Group via IGN; the games' publishers are listed in brackets

Best-selling video games of 2007 in North America (by platform)
Place	DS	PC	PS2	PS3	PSP	Wii	XB360
1	Pokémon Diamond (Nintendo)	World of Warcraft: The Burning Crusade (Blizzard Entertainment)	Madden NFL 08 (Electronic Arts)	Madden NFL 08 (Electronic Arts)	MLB 07: The Show (Sony Computer Entertainment)	Wii Play (Nintendo)	Halo 3 (Microsoft)
2	Pokémon Pearl (Nintendo)	The Sims 2: Seasons (Electronic Arts)	God of War II (Sony Computer Entertainment)	Call of Duty 4: Modern Warfare (Activision)	Madden NFL 08 (Electronic Arts)	Mario Party 8 (Nintendo)	Call of Duty 4: Modern Warfare (Activision)
3	The Legend of Zelda: Phantom Hourglass (Nintendo)	Command & Conquer 3: Tiberium Wars (Electronic Arts)	Guitar Hero III: Legends of Rock (RedOctane)	Assassin's Creed (Ubisoft)	Ratchet & Clank: Size Matters (Sony Computer Entertainment)	Super Mario Galaxy (Nintendo)	Guitar Hero II (RedOctane)
4	Diddy Kong Racing (Nintendo)	The Sims 2: Bon Voyage (Electronic Arts)	Guitar Hero Encore: Rocks the 80s (RedOctane)	MotorStorm (Sony Computer Entertainment)	Transformers: The Game (Activision)	Super Paper Mario (Nintendo)	Madden NFL 08 (Electronic Arts)
5	Brain Age 2: More Training in Minutes a Day! (Nintendo)	Supreme Commander (THQ)	MLB 07: The Show (Sony Computer Entertainment)	Guitar Hero III: Legends of Rock (RedOctane)	Final Fantasy Tactics: The War of the Lions (Square Enix)	Guitar Hero III: Legends of Rock (RedOctane)	Assassin's Creed (Ubisoft)
6	Spectrobes (Disney Interactive)	The Lord of the Rings Online: Shadows of Angmar (Midway)	Spider-Man 3 (Activision)	Tom Clancy's Rainbow Six: Vegas (Ubisoft)	300: March to Glory (Warner Bros. Interactive)	WarioWare: Smooth Moves (Nintendo)	BioShock (2K Games)
7	High School Musical: Makin' the Cut! (Disney Interactive)	The Orange Box (Valve)	NCAA Football 08 (Electronic Arts)	NCAA Football 08 (Electronic Arts)	Call of Duty: Roads to Victory (Activision)	Metroid Prime 3: Corruption (Nintendo)	Crackdown (Microsoft)
8	MySims (Electronic Arts)	Call of Duty 4: Modern Warfare (Activision)	Transformers: The Game (Activision)	Heavenly Sword (Sony Computer Entertainment)	Major League Baseball 2K7 (2K Games)	Resident Evil 4: Wii Edition (Capcom)	Guitar Hero III: Legends of Rock (RedOctane)
9	Paws and Claws: Pet Vet (THQ)	BioShock (2K Games)	Grand Theft Auto: Vice City Stories (Rockstar Games)	Ninja Gaiden Sigma (Tecmo)	Tom Clancy's Rainbow Six: Vegas (Ubisoft)	Mario Strikers Charged (Nintendo)	Tom Clancy's Ghost Recon Advanced Warfighter 2 (Ubisoft)
10	Mario Party DS (Nintendo)	The Sims 2: H&M Fashion Stuff (Electronic Arts)	Naruto: Ultimate Ninja 2 (Bandai)	The Elder Scrolls IV: Oblivion (Bethesda Softworks)	Ghost Rider (2K Games)	Pokémon Battle Revolution (Nintendo)	Lost Planet: Extreme Condition (Capcom)

United Kingdom

- Based on figures from Chart-Track; the games' publishers are listed in brackets

Best-selling video games of 2007 in the UK (by platform)
Place	DS	PS2	PS3	PSP	Wii	XB360
1	Dr Kawashima's Brain Training: How Old is Your Brain? (Nintendo)	FIFA 08 (Electronic Arts)	Resistance: Fall of Man (Sony Computer Entertainment)	Grand Theft Auto: Vice City Stories (Rockstar Games)	Wii Play (Nintendo)	Halo 3 (Microsoft)
2	More Brain Training from Dr Kawashima (Nintendo)	Pro Evolution Soccer 2008 (Konami)	MotorStorm (Sony Computer Entertainment)	FIFA 08 (Electronic Arts)	Mario & Sonic at the Olympic Games (Sega)	Call of Duty 4: Modern Warfare (Activision)
3	New Super Mario Bros. (Nintendo)	The Simpsons Game (Electronic Arts)	Call of Duty 4: Modern Warfare (Activision)	Sega Mega Drive Collection (Sega)	Big Brain Academy: Wii Degree (Nintendo)	Assassin's Creed (Ubisoft)
4	Cooking Mama (505 Games)	Final Fantasy XII (Square Enix)	FIFA 08 (Electronic Arts)	Pro Evolution Soccer 6 (Konami)	Super Mario Galaxy (Nintendo)	Forza Motorsport 2 (Microsoft)
5	Big Brain Academy (Nintendo)	High School Musical: Sing It! (Disney)	Assassin's Creed (Ubisoft)	Grand Theft Auto: Liberty City Stories (Rockstar Games)	Mario Party 8 (Nintendo)	FIFA 08 (Electronic Arts)
6	Pokémon Diamond (Nintendo)	WWE SmackDown vs. Raw 2008 (THQ)	Pro Evolution Soccer 2008 (Konami)	Sonic Rivals (Sega)	WarioWare: Smooth Moves (Nintendo)	Pro Evolution Soccer 2008 (Konami)
7	42 All-Time Classics (Nintendo)	Need for Speed: ProStreet (Electronic Arts)	Formula One Championship Edition (Sony Computer Entertainment)	The Simpsons Game (Electronic Arts)	The Legend of Zelda: Twilight Princess (Nintendo)	Crackdown (Microsoft)
8	Nintendogs: Labrador & Friends (Nintendo)	Spider-Man 3 (Activision)	Need for Speed: ProStreet (Electronic Arts)	FIFA 07 (Electronic Arts)	Mario Strikers Charged Football (Nintendo)	Gears of War (Microsoft)
9	Sonic Rush (Sega)	Grand Theft Auto: Vice City Stories (Rockstar Games)	Uncharted: Drake's Fortune (Sony Computer Entertainment)	Midnight Club 3: DUB Edition (Rockstar Games)	Sonic and the Secret Rings (Sega)	Lost Planet: Extreme Condition (Capcom)
10	Zoo Tycoon DS (THQ)	Transformers: The Game (Activision)	WWE SmackDown vs. Raw 2008 (THQ)	Need for Speed: Carbon (Electronic Arts)	Resident Evil 4 (Capcom)	BioShock (2K Games)

=== All time video game sales ===
United States

- Based on figures from the NPD Group (Note: This list only includes games that were released after NPD started tracking video game sales data in 1995.)

Best-selling video games of all time in the US (as of September 25, 2007)
Place	Title	Units sold
1	Grand Theft Auto: San Andreas	8.6 million
2	Madden NFL 07	7.4 million
3	Grand Theft Auto: Vice City	6.8 million
4	Madden NFL 06	6.5 million
5	Halo 2	6.3 million
6	Namco Museum	6.2 million
7	Super Mario 64	6.0 million
8	Madden NFL 2005	5.9 million
9	Grand Theft Auto III	5.7 million
10	Tony Hawk's Pro Skater 2	5.3 million

== Top-rated games ==
=== Critically acclaimed games ===
Metacritic (MC) and GameRankings (GR) are aggregators of video game journalism reviews.

2007 games and expansions scoring at least 88/100 (MC) or 87.5% (GR)
Game	Publisher	Release Date	Platform	MC score	GR score
Super Mario Galaxy	Nintendo	November 1, 2007	Wii	97/100	97.64%
The Orange Box	Valve	October 10, 2007	XB360	96/100	96.36%
The Orange Box	Valve	October 10, 2007	WIN	96/100	95.88%
BioShock	2K Games	August 21, 2007	XB360	96/100	95.07%
BioShock	2K Games	August 21, 2007	WIN	96/100	94.58%
Call of Duty 4: Modern Warfare	Activision	November 5, 2007	XB360	94/100	94.16%
Call of Duty 4: Modern Warfare	Activision	November 5, 2007	PS3	94/100	93.54%
Halo 3	Microsoft Game Studios	September 25, 2007	XB360	94/100	93.53%
The Elder Scrolls IV: Oblivion	Bethesda Softworks	March 20, 2007	PS3	93/100	92.98%
God of War II	Sony Computer Entertainment	March 13, 2007	PS2	93/100	92.68%
Galactic Civilizations II: Dark Avatar	Stardock	February 8, 2007	WIN	91/100	92.61%
Team Fortress 2	Valve	October 10, 2007	WIN	92/100	92.6%
Guitar Hero II	Activision	April 3, 2007	XB360	92/100	92.3%
Call of Duty 4: Modern Warfare	Activision	November 5, 2007	WIN	92/100	92.29%
Rock Band	MTV Games	November 20, 2007	XB360	92/100	91.97%
Rock Band	MTV Games	November 20, 2007	PS3	92/100	91.23%
Resident Evil 4: Wii Edition	Capcom	May 31, 2007	Wii	91/100	91.59%
World of Warcraft: The Burning Crusade	Blizzard Entertainment	January 16, 2007	WIN	91/100	91.48%
Mass Effect	Microsoft Game Studios	November 20, 2007	XB360	91/100	91.24%
Crysis	Electronic Arts	November 13, 2007	WIN	91/100	90.23%
Half-Life 2: Episode Two	Valve	October 10, 2007	WIN	90/100	90.68%
Metroid Prime 3: Corruption	Nintendo	August 27, 2007	Wii	90/100	90.23%
Forza Motorsport 2	Microsoft Game Studios	May 29, 2007	XB360	90/100	89.98%
The Legend of Zelda: Phantom Hourglass	Nintendo	June 23, 2007	DS	90/100	88.82%
Portal	Valve	October 10, 2007	WIN	90/100	88.81%
Uncharted: Drake's Fortune	Sony Computer Entertainment	November 20, 2007	PS3	88/100	89.67%
Castlevania: Symphony of the Night	Konami	March 21, 2007	XB360	89/100	89.58%
Virtua Fighter 5 Online	Sega	October 26, 2007	XB360	89/100	89.37%
World in Conflict	Vivendi Games	September 18, 2007	WIN	89/100	89.16%
The Orange Box	Valve	December 11, 2007	PS3	89/100	88.97%
Ratchet & Clank Future: Tools of Destruction	Sony Computer Entertainment	October 23, 2007	PS3	89/100	88.74%
Persona 3 FES	Atlus	April 19, 2007	PS2	89/100	87.8%
Final Fantasy Tactics: The War of the Lions	Square Enix	May 10, 2007	PSP	88/100	88.26%
Puzzle Quest: Challenge of the Warlords	D3 Publisher	October 10, 2007	XB360	87/100	88.14%
Sam & Max Save the World	Telltale Games	August 7, 2007	WIN	N/A	88.06%
The World Ends with You	Square Enix	July 27, 2007	DS	88/100	87.99%
Ninja Gaiden Sigma	Tecmo	June 14, 2007	PS3	88/100	86.72%
The Elder Scrolls IV: Shivering Isles	Bethesda Softworks	October 16, 2007	XB360	86/100	87.62%
Hitman Trilogy	IO Interactive	June 19, 2007	PS2	—N/a	87.56%

=== Major awards ===
Category/Organization		4th British Academy Games Awards October 23, 2007	25th Golden Joystick Awards October 26, 2007	VGA December 9, 2007	11th Annual Interactive Achievement Awards February 8, 2008		8th Game Developers Choice Awards February 20, 2008
Game of the Year		BioShock	Gears of War	BioShock	Call of Duty 4: Modern Warfare		Portal
Downloadable		—N/a	—N/a	—N/a	Puzzle Quest: Challenge of the Warlords		flOw
Mobile/Handheld	Mobile	—N/a	Final Fantasy	The Legend of Zelda: Phantom Hourglass	skate. Mobile		The Legend of Zelda: Phantom Hourglass
Mobile/Handheld	Handheld	—N/a	Grand Theft Auto: Vice City Stories	The Legend of Zelda: Phantom Hourglass	The Legend of Zelda: Phantom Hourglass		The Legend of Zelda: Phantom Hourglass
Innovation		Wii Sports	Wii	—N/a	Rock Band		Portal
Artistic Achievement or Graphics (Note: Certain award presentations combine these categories.)	Animation	Ōkami	—N/a	Crysis	Assassin's Creed		BioShock
Artistic Achievement or Graphics	Art Direction	Ōkami	—N/a	Crysis	BioShock		BioShock
Audio	Music	Ōkami	—N/a	BioShock	BioShock		BioShock
Audio	Sound Design	Crackdown	—N/a	—N/a	BioShock		BioShock
Audio	Soundtrack	—N/a	Guitar Hero II	Rock Band			BioShock
Character Performance		—N/a	—N/a	—N/a	GLaDOS from Portal		—N/a
Game Design		Wii Sports	—N/a	—N/a	Portal		
Narrative		God of War II	—N/a	—N/a	BioShock		
Technical Achievement	Gameplay Engineering	God of War II	—N/a	The Orange Box / Portal	Portal		Crysis
Technical Achievement	Visual Engineering	God of War II	—N/a	The Orange Box / Portal	Crysis		Crysis
Multiplayer/Online		Wii Sports	World of Warcraft: The Burning Crusade	Halo 3	Call of Duty 4: Modern Warfare		—N/a
Action/Adventure	Action/Shooter	Crackdown	—N/a	Call of Duty 4: Modern Warfare			—N/a
Action/Adventure	Adventure	Crackdown	—N/a	Super Mario Galaxy			—N/a
Casual/Family or Rhythm		Wii Sports		Rock Band			—N/a
Role-Playing	RPG	—N/a	—N/a	Mass Effect	Mass Effect		—N/a
Role-Playing	MMORPG	—N/a	—N/a	Mass Effect	World of Warcraft: The Burning Crusade		—N/a
Sports	Individual	Wii Sports	—N/a	skate.	skate.		—N/a
Sports	Team	Wii Sports	—N/a	Madden NFL 08	skate.		—N/a
Racing		—N/a	—N/a	Colin McRae: Dirt	MotorStorm		—N/a
Strategy/Simulation		Wii Sports	—N/a	—N/a	Command & Conquer 3: Tiberium Wars		—N/a
Special Award		Academy Fellowship	—N/a		Hall of Fame	Lifetime Achievement Award	Lifetime Achievement Award
Special Award		Will Wright	—N/a		Michael Morhaime	Ken Kutaragi	Sid Meier

== Major events ==
Date	Event	Ref.
March 14	Microsoft announces Games for Windows – Live, a version of Xbox Live for the Windows platform. The service launched on May 8.	
March 19	Justin.tv, a website designed specially for streaming videogames, is launched.	
March 27	Microsoft announced the Xbox 360 Elite. The revision comes with a bigger hard drive and the ability to output HDMI.	
April 11	Sony announces that they are discontinuing the 20 GB PlayStation 3 SKU, one of two SKUs available at the systems launch, leaving only the 60 GB SKU available for consumer purchase.	
June 27	Nintendo announces WiiWare, a service similar to Xbox Live Arcade, that allows developers to release original downloadable games for the Wii. Previously the only downloadable games available on the Wii had been limited to its Virtual Console service.	
July 5	After an outpouring of complaints over faulty Xbox 360 hardware, Microsoft announces an extension for the Xbox 360's warranty that applies retroactively to all consumers who have purchased the console since launch.	
July 11–13	The 11th E3 is held at several hotels and the Barker Hangar in Santa Monica, California, United States.	
August 23–26	The Leipzig Games Developers Convention in Leipzig, Germany.	
August 24–26	Penny Arcade Expo (PAX) at the Washington State Convention and Trade Center in Seattle, Washington, United States.	
August 29	Nokia reveals plans to revive its failing N-Gage brand in November; however, this time the line will not be a console, but rather a service players can download onto Nokia phones and PCs.	
September 20–23	Tokyo Game Show at the Makuhari Messe International Convention complex in Mihama-ku, Chiba, Japan.	
September 26	Activision buys Bizarre Creations, developer of the Project Gotham Racing series.	
September 28–30	Digital Life at New York's Jacob K. Javits Convention Center in New York, New York, United States.	
October 5	Bungie announces its split with Microsoft to become an independent studio.	
October 11	Electronic Arts (EA) announces plans to buy VG Holding Corp., which owns both Pandemic Studios and BioWare, effectively making both companies subsidiaries.	
October 18–20	E for All Expo at the Los Angeles Convention Center in Los Angeles, California, United States.	
November 2–4	Videogames Expo (VGXPO) at the Pennsylvania Convention Center in Philadelphia, Pennsylvania, United States.	
November 6	EA closes down its EA Chicago studios.	
November 27–28	Montreal Games Summit at the Palais de Congress international convention.	
December 9	The 2007 Spike Video Game Awards are held.	

== Hardware releases ==
Date	System
February 11	Net Jet
February 11	Xbox 360^{RU}
March 23	PlayStation 3^{PAL}
August 30	PlayStation Portable PSP-2000^{HK}
September 30	Wii^{ZA}

== Game releases in 2007 ==
Release Date	Title	Platform	Genre	Ref.
January 2	Karaoke Revolution Presents: American Idol	PS2		
January 2	Yu-Gi-Oh! GX Spirit Caller	DS		
January 4	GripShift	PSN		
January 9	Arthur and the Invisibles	GBA, GCN, DS, PS2, PS3, PSP, WIN, XB, XB360		
January 9	The Shield	PS2		
January 12	Lost Planet: Extreme Condition	XB360, PS3, WIN		
January 15	WarioWare: Smooth Moves	Wii		
January 16	Phoenix Wright: Ace Attorney − Justice for All	DS		
January 16	World of Warcraft: The Burning Crusade	OSX, WIN		
January 17	NCAA March Madness 07	PS2, XB360		
January 22	Hotel Dusk: Room 215	DS		
January 22	The Shield	WIN		
January 23	Inuyasha: Secret of the Divine Jewel	DS		
January 23	The Legend of Heroes III: Song of the Ocean	PSP		
January 26	Europa Universalis III	WIN		
January 30	Battlestations: Midway	XB360, WIN		
January 30	Rogue Galaxy	PS2		
January 30	Sonic the Hedgehog (2006)	PS3		
February 5	Diddy Kong Racing DS	DS		
February 5	Final Fantasy VI Advance	GBA		
February 6	Ar tonelico: Melody of Elemia	PS2		
February 6	Capcom Puzzle World	PSP		
February 6	Lunar Knights	DS		
February 6	Micro Machines V4	DS		
February 6	MVP 07: NCAA Baseball	PS2		
February 6	The Sims Life Stories	WIN		
February 6	Winning Eleven: Pro Evolution Soccer 2007	PS3, XB360		
February 8	Galactic Civilizations II: Dark Avatar	WIN		
February 12	Gurumin: A Monstrous Adventure	PSP		
February 12	The Warriors	PSP		
February 12	Wii Play	Wii		
February 13	Chulip	PS2		
February 13	Disney's Kim Possible: Global Gemini	DS, PS2, PS3, Wii, XB360		
February 13	Ghost Rider	GBA, PS2, PSP		
February 13	Ratchet & Clank: Size Matters	PSP		
February 14	Paperboy	XB360		
February 15	Myst Online: Uru Live	WIN		
February 19	Monster Kingdom: Jewel Summoner	PSP		
February 19	NBA Street Homecourt	XB360		
February 20	Crackdown	XB360		
February 20	M.A.C.H.	PSP		
February 20	Maelstrom	WIN		
February 20	Metal Slug Anthology	PSP		
February 20	Sonic and the Secret Rings	Wii		
February 20	Supreme Commander	WIN		
February 20	Virtua Fighter 5	PS3		
February 23	War Front: Turning Point	WIN		
February 26	Jade Empire	WIN		
February 27	300: March to Glory	PSP		
February 27	Bullet Witch	XB360		
February 27	Chili Con Carnage	PSP		
February 27	Dance Dance Revolution Universe	XB360		
February 27	Earthquake in Zipland	WIN		
February 27	Marvel Trading Card Game	PSP		
February 27	Meteos: Disney Magic	DS		
February 27	Peggle	WIN		
February 27	SSX Blur	Wii		
February 28	Alien Hominid	XB360		
March 1	Tekken 5: Dark Resurrection	PS3		
March 5	Grand Theft Auto: Vice City Stories	PS2		
March 5	Wario: Master of Disguise	DS		
March 6	Burnout Dominator	PS2, PSP		
March 6	Def Jam: Icon	PS3, XB360		
March 6	MotorStorm	PS3		
March 6	NBA Street Homecourt	PS3		
March 6	Rayman Raving Rabbids (handheld)	DS		
March 6	Tom Clancy's Ghost Recon Advanced Warfighter 2	XB360		
March 6	Uno Free Fall	GBA		
March 9	Silverfall	WIN		
March 11	Ratchet & Clank: Size Matters	PS2		
March 13	Call of Duty: Roads to Victory	PSP		
March 13	God of War II	PS2		
March 13	Knights and Merchants: The Shattered Kingdom	LIN		
March 13	Spectrobes	DS		
March 14	Formula One Championship Edition	PS3		
March 15	Drake and Josh	GBA		
March 16	Puzzle Quest: Challenge of the Warlords	DS, PSP		
March 19	Custom Robo Arena	DS		
March 20	After Burner: Black Falcon	PSP		
March 20	Armored Core 4	PS3, XB360		
March 20	Blazing Angels: Squadrons of WWII	Wii		
March 20	Cooking Mama: Cook Off	Wii		
March 20	Earth Defense Force 2017	XB360		
March 20	Kororinpa: Marble Mania	Wii		
March 20	Lost in Blue 2	DS		
March 20	Rocky Balboa	PSP		
March 20	Silent Hunter 4: Wolves of the Pacific	WIN		
March 20	Test Drive Unlimited	PS2, WIN		
March 20	The Elder Scrolls IV: Oblivion	PS3		
March 20	The Godfather	PS3, Wii		
March 20	Theme Park	DS		
March 20	TMNT	GCN, DS, PS2, Wii, XB360, PSP, WIN		
March 20	UEFA Champions League 2006–2007	PS2, GCN, DS, PSP, Wii, XB360		
March 20	Virtua Tennis 3	PS3, XB360		
March 21	Dragon Ball Z: Harukanaru Densetsu	DS		
March 21	Test Drive Unlimited	PSP		
March 23	Brian Lara International Cricket 2007 (EU)	PS2, XB360, WIN		
March 23	S.T.A.L.K.E.R.: Shadow of Chernobyl	WIN		
March 23	Wing Island	Wii		
March 26	Medal of Honor: Vanguard	PS2, Wii		
March 26	Virtua Tennis 3	PSP		
March 27	Disney's Meet the Robinsons	WIN, PS2, GBA, DS, Wii, XB360, GCN		
March 27	Honeycomb Beat	DS		
March 27	Konami Classics Series: Arcade Hits	DS		
March 27	Metal Slug Anthology	PS2		
March 27	Purr Pals	DS, Wii		
March 27	The Elder Scrolls IV: Shivering Isles	XB360, WIN		
March 28	Command & Conquer 3: Tiberium Wars	WIN		
March 28	Jetpac Refuelled	XB360		
March 30	Penumbra: Overture	WIN		
March 30	Tom Clancy's Splinter Cell: Double Agent	PS3		
April 3	Enchanted Arms	PS3		
April 3	Final Fantasy Fables: Chocobo Tales	DS		
April 3	Guitar Hero II	XB360		
April 3	Pimp My Ride	PSP		
April 3	Prince of Persia: Rival Swords	PSP, Wii		
April 3	SingStar Pop	PS2		
April 9	Super Paper Mario	Wii		
April 17	Bust-A-Move Bash!	Wii		
April 18	3D Ultra Minigolf Adventures	XB360		
April 19	Super Rub 'a' Dub	PS3		
April 22	Pokémon Diamond and Pearl (NA)	DS		
April 23	Made Man	PS2		
April 24	Aedis Eclipse: Generation of Chaos	PSP		
April 24	Bionicle Heroes	Wii		
April 24	Rayman Raving Rabbids	XB360		
April 24	SNK vs. Capcom: Card Fighters DS	DS		
April 24	The Fast and the Furious	PSP		
April 24	The Lord of the Rings Online: Shadows of Angmar	WIN		
April 25	Eets: Chowdown	XB360		
May 1	Heatseeker	PS2, Wii		
May 1	Legend of the Dragon	PS2, Wii		
May 1	UFO: Extraterrestrials	WIN		
May 4	ArmA: Combat Operations	WIN		
May 4	Spider-Man 3	GBA, DS, PS2, Wii, XB360, WIN		
May 8	Command & Conquer 3: Tiberium Wars	XB360		
May 8	Driver 76	PSP		
May 8	Heatseeker	PSP		
May 8	Infernal	WIN		
May 10	Calling All Cars!	PSN		
May 15	Etrian Odyssey	DS		
May 15	Innocent Life: A Futuristic Harvest Moon	PSP		
May 15	MLB 07: The Show	PS2, PS3, PSP		
May 15	Resident Evil 4	WIN		
May 15	Touch the Dead	DS		
May 16	Aegis Wing	XB360		
May 16	Soltrio Solitaire	XB360		
May 16	Sudokuro	DS		
May 16	Taito Legends 2	PS2		
May 17	Taito Legends Power-Up	PSP		
May 22	Dawn of Mana	PS2		
May 22	Death, Jr. and the Science Fair of Doom	DS		
May 22	Marvel Trading Card Game	DS		
May 22	Odin Sphere	PS2		
May 22	Pirates of the Caribbean: At World's End	GCN, DS, PS2, PS3, PSP, Wii, WIN, XB360		
May 23	Xevious	XB360		
May 25	Alpha Prime	WIN		
May 25	Penumbra: Overture	LIN		
May 29	Atelier Iris 3: Grand Phantasm	PS2		
May 29	Crush	PSP		
May 29	Forza Motorsport 2	XB360		
May 29	Legend of the Dragon	PSP		
May 29	Mario Party 8	Wii		
May 29	Mortal Kombat: Armageddon	Wii		
May 29	Shadowrun	XB360, WIN		
May 29	Tank Beat	DS		
May 29	WarTech: Senko no Ronde	XB360		
May 30	Surf's Up	GBA, DS, PS2, PS3, PSP, Wii, XB360		
May 31	Halo 2 for Windows Vista	WIN		
June 1	Surf's Up	GCN, WIN		
June 4	Planet Puzzle League	DS		
June 5	Tomb Raider: Anniversary	PS2, WIN		
June 6	Pac-Man Championship Edition	XB360		
June 7	Ballistics	LIN		
June 7	Call of Juarez	XB360		
June 7	Nancy Drew: The White Wolf of Icicle Creek	WIN		
June 8	Marvel Trading Card Game	WIN		
June 11	Big Brain Academy: Wii Degree	Wii		
June 12	Dream Chronicles	WIN		
June 12	Naruto: Ultimate Ninja 2	PS2		
June 12	Scarface: The World Is Yours	Wii		
June 12	Tenchu Z	XB360		
June 12	Time Ace	DS		
June 12	Tom Clancy's Rainbow Six: Vegas	PSP		
June 13	Prince of Persia Classic	XB360		
June 18	PQ2: Practical Intelligence Quotient 2	PSP		
June 19	B-17: Fortress in the Sky	DS		
June 19	Brothers in Arms DS	DS		
June 19	Dirt	XB360, WIN		
June 19	Dungeon Maker: Hunting Ground	PSP		
June 19	Raw Danger!	PS2		
June 19	Resident Evil 4: Wii Edition	Wii		
June 19	SimCity DS	DS		
June 19	Transformers Autobots and Decepticons	DS		
June 25	Harry Potter and the Order of the Phoenix	WIN, PS2, PS3, XB360, PSP, DS, Wii, GBA, OSX		
June 25	Hoshigami Remix	DS		
June 25	Hour of Victory	XB360		
June 25	Pokémon Battle Revolution	Wii		
June 25	The Adventures of Darwin	PS2		
June 25	The Darkness	PS3, XB360		
June 26	Final Fantasy Anniversary Edition	PSP		
June 26	GrimGrimoire	PS2		
June 26	Nervous Brickdown	DS		
June 26	Overlord	XB360, WIN		
June 26	Ratatouille	Wii, XB360, PS2, XB, DS, GCN, GBA, PSP, WIN, OSX		
June 26	Switchball	WIN		
June 26	Transformers: The Game	PS2, PS3, Wii, XB360, WIN		
June 26	Zendoku	DS		
June 27	Carcassonne	XB360		
June 28	Super Stardust HD	PSN		
June 30	Rafa Nadal Tennis	DS		
July 1	Smash Court Tennis 3	PSP		
July 3	Ninja Gaiden Sigma	PS3		
July 3	Vampire Rain	XB360		
July 7	The Adventures of Cookie & Cream	DS		
July 10	Project Sylpheed	XB360		
July 10	Riviera: The Promised Land	PSP		
July 11	Sonic the Hedgehog	XB360		
July 17	NCAA Football 08	PS2, PS3, XB, XB360		
July 17	PaRappa the Rapper	PSP		
July 17	Tales of the World: Radiant Mythology	PSP		
July 18	Bomberman Live	XB360		
July 18	Deal or No Deal	GBA		
July 23	Civilization IV: Beyond the Sword	WIN		
July 23	Deal or No Deal	DS		
July 23	NASCAR 08	GCN, PS2, PS3, PSP, Wii, XB360		
July 24	Alien Syndrome	PSP, Wii		
July 24	Dynasty Warriors DS: Fighter's Battle	DS		
July 24	Final Fantasy II	PSP		
July 25	Escape from Bug Island	Wii		
July 25	Wing Commander Arena	XB360		
July 27	The World Ends with You	DS		
July 30	Drake & Josh: Talent Showdown	DS, PS2, PS3, Wii, XB360		
July 30	Mario Strikers Charged	Wii		
July 30	Picross DS	DS		
July 31	Harvest Moon: Boy & Girl	PSP		
August 6	Chameleon: To Dye For!	DS		
August 7	Crazy Taxi: Fare Wars	PSP		
August 7	Mega Man Star Force	DS		
August 9	Piyotama	PS3, PSP		
August 9	Tomb Raider: Anniversary	PSP		
August 14	Billy the Wizard: Rocket Broomstick Racing	Wii		
August 14	Heroes of Mana	DS		
August 14	High School Musical: Makin' the Cut!	DS		
August 14	Luminous Arc	DS		
August 14	Madden NFL 08	GCN, DS, PS2, PS3, PSP, Wii, XB, XB360, WIN		
August 14	Persona 3 (NA)	PS2		
August 14	Rune Factory: A Fantasy Harvest Moon	DS		
August 15	Sam & Max Season One	WIN		
August 16	Bloons Tower Defense	WIN, OSX		
August 20	Brain Age 2: More Training in Minutes a Day!	DS		
August 21	BioShock	XB360, WIN		
August 21	Dragoneer's Aria	PSP		
August 21	The Settlers II	DS		
August 22	Street Trace NYC	XB360		
August 24	Thomas & Friends: A Day at the Races/Day of the Races	PS2		
August 27	Carnival Games	DS, Wii		
August 27	Metroid Prime 3: Corruption	Wii		
August 27	NHRA: Countdown to the Championship	PSP		
August 28	Blue Dragon	XB360		
August 28	Brunswick Pro Bowling	PS2, PSP, Wii		
August 28	Dead Head Fred	PSP		
August 28	Dynasty Warriors: Gundam	PS2, PS3, XB360		
August 28	Medieval II: Total War: Kingdoms	WIN		
August 28	Warhawk	PS3		
August 28	Wild Arms 5	PS2		
August 29	Monster Hunter Freedom 2	PSP		
August 31	Guild Wars: Eye of the North	WIN		
August 31	Lair	PS3		
September 4	Medal of Honor: Airborne	PS3, XB360, WIN		
September 4	The Sims 2: Bon Voyage	WIN		
September 4	Worms: Open Warfare 2	DS, PSP		
September 7	Stranglehold	XB360		
September 9	Balls of Fury	DS		
September 10	DK Jungle Climber	DS		
September 10	Drawn to Life	DS		
September 11	Dirt	PS3		
September 11	Fatal Inertia	XB360		
September 11	Guilty Gear XX: Accent Core	PS2		
September 11	Jam Sessions	DS		
September 11	NHL 08	PS2, PS3, XB360, WIN, Wii		
September 11	Zoey 101: Field Trip Fiasco	DS, PS2, PS3, Wii, XB360		
September 12	Heavenly Sword	PS3		
September 13	PixelJunk Racers	PSN		
September 13	Skate	PS3, XB360		
September 16	Osu!	WIN, OSX		
September 17	7 Wonders of the Ancient World	DS		
September 17	Eternal Sonata	XB360		
September 17	Juiced 2: Hot Import Nights	DS, PS2, XB360		
September 17	Stuntman: Ignition	PS2, PS3, XB360		
September 18	Coded Arms: Contagion	PSP		
September 18	Dewy's Adventure	Wii		
September 18	Digimon World Dawn and Dusk	DS		
September 18	MySims	DS, Wii		
September 18	Sonic Rush Adventure	DS		
September 18	Warriors Orochi	PS2		
September 18	World in Conflict	WIN		
September 19	Geon: Emotions	XB360		
September 20	LocoRoco Cocoreccho	PSN		
September 24	Company of Heroes: Opposing Fronts	WIN		
September 24	Jackass: The Game	PS2		
September 24	Spelling Challenges and More!	DS		
September 25	Anubis II	Wii		
September 25	Balls of Fury	Wii		
September 25	CSI: 3 Dimensions of Murder	PS2		
September 25	CSI: Hard Evidence	Wii		
September 25	Dance Dance Revolution Hottest Party	XB360, PS3, Wii		
September 25	Dance Dance Revolution SuperNova 2	PS2		
September 25	Dave Mirra BMX Challenge	Wii		
September 25	Dragon Blade: Wrath of Fire	Wii		
September 25	Halo 3	XB360		
September 25	Hot Wheels: Beat That!	PS2		
September 25	Race Driver: Create & Race	DS		
September 25	Soul Nomad & the World Eaters	PS2		
September 25	The Settlers: Rise of an Empire	WIN		
September 26	Hot Wheels: Beat That!	XB360		
September 27	Jackass: The Game	PSP		
September 27	Neverwinter Nights 2: Mask of the Betrayer	WIN		
September 30	Hot Wheels: Beat That!	Wii		
October 1	The Legend of Zelda: Phantom Hourglass	DS		
October 2	Backyard Hockey	DS		
October 2	Chibi-Robo!: Park Patrol	DS		
October 2	Enemy Territory: Quake Wars	WIN		
October 2	Geometry Wars: Waves	XB360		
October 2	NBA Live 08	PS2, XB360, Wii, DS, PSP		
October 2	Project Gotham Racing 4	XB360		
October 2	Spider-Man: Friend or Foe	WIN, PS2, XB360, Wii, DS, PSP		
October 2	Syphon Filter: Logan's Shadow	PSP		
October 2	The Legend of Spyro: The Eternal Night	PS2, GBA, DS		
October 3	Ninjabread Man	Wii		
October 3	Tetris Splash	XB360		
October 4	Crash of the Titans	PSP, PS2, XB360, GBA, DS		
October 4	Feel Ski	PSN		
October 8	Donkey Kong Barrel Blast	Wii		
October 8	FIFA 08	PSP		
October 8	MinDStorm	DS		
October 8	Nancy Drew: Legend of the Crystal Skull	WIN		
October 9	Bleach: Shattered Blade	Wii		
October 9	Bleach: The Blade of Fate	DS		
October 9	FIFA 08	WIN, PS2, XB360, PS3, Wii, DS		
October 9	Final Fantasy Tactics: The War of the Lions	PSP		
October 9	Folklore	PS3		
October 9	Looney Tunes: Acme Arsenal	PS2, Wii, XB360		
October 9	Looney Tunes: Duck Amuck	DS		
October 9	Mountain Bike Adrenaline	PS2		
October 9	Sega Rally Revo	PS3, XB360, PSP		
October 9	Star Wars Battlefront: Renegade Squadron	PSP		
October 9	The Cheetah Girls: Pop Star Sensations	DS		
October 9	Thrillville: Off The Rails	WIN, PS2, XB360, PS3, Wii, DS		
October 9	Touch Detective 2 ½	DS		
October 10	Half-Life 2	XB360		
October 10	Half-Life 2: Episode One	XB360		
October 10	Half-Life 2: Episode Two	XB360, WIN		
October 10	Portal	XB360, WIN		
October 10	Team Fortress 2	XB360, WIN		
October 10	The Orange Box	XB360, WIN		
October 10	Yaris	XB360		
October 11	Everyday Shooter	PS3		
October 15	Flash Focus: Vision Training in Minutes a Day	DS		
October 15	The Aly & AJ Adventure	DS		
October 16	Ace Combat 6: Fires of Liberation	XB360		
October 16	Beautiful Katamari	XB360		
October 16	Clive Barker's Jericho	PS3, XB360, WIN		
October 16	Disney Princess: Magical Jewels	DS		
October 16	Front Mission	DS		
October 16	Fury	WIN		
October 16	Guilty Gear XX: Accent Core	Wii		
October 16	Mercury Meltdown Revolution	Wii		
October 16	Microsoft Flight Simulator X: Acceleration	WIN		
October 16	Painkiller: Overdose	WIN		
October 16	Rockstar Games Presents Table Tennis	Wii		
October 16	Spider-Man 3	PSP		
October 16	Tony Hawk's Proving Ground	PS2, XB360, PS3, Wii, DS		
October 16	Victorious Boxers: Revolution	Wii		
October 16	Zack & Wiki: Quest for Barbaros' Treasure	Wii		
October 17	Avatar: The Last Airbender – The Burning Earth	PS2, Wii, GBA, DS		
October 17	Every Extend Extra Extreme	XB360		
October 17	Zoo Tycoon 2: Extinct Animals	WIN		
October 18	Heroes of Might and Magic V: Tribes of the East	WIN		
October 18	The Legend of Spyro: The Eternal Night	Wii		
October 19	Enemy Territory: Quake Wars	LIN		
October 19	Hard to Be a God	WIN		
October 19	Hired Guns: The Jagged Edge	WIN		
October 22	Juiced 2: Hot Import Nights	PS3		
October 22	The Sims 2: Castaway	PS2, Wii, DS, PSP		
October 23	Age of Empires III: The Asian Dynasties	WIN		
October 23	Castlevania: The Dracula X Chronicles	PSP		
October 23	Conan	XB360, PS3		
October 23	Ed, Edd n Eddy: Scam of the Century	DS		
October 23	Mega Man ZX Advent	DS		
October 23	Naruto: Clash of Ninja Revolution	Wii		
October 23	Naruto: Path of the Ninja	DS		
October 23	Nicktoons: Attack of the Toybots	PS2, Wii, GBA, DS		
October 23	Pac 'n Roll	Wii		
October 23	Phoenix Wright: Ace Attorney − Trials and Tribulations	DS		
October 23	Power Rangers: Super Legends	DS		
October 23	Ratatouille	PS3		
October 23	Ratchet & Clank Future: Tools of Destruction	PS3		
October 23	SpongeBob's Atlantis SquarePantis	PS2, GBA, DS		
October 23	Tomb Raider: Anniversary	XB360		
October 24	Exit	XB360		
October 24	The Eye of Judgment	PS3		
October 25	Sea Monsters: A Prehistoric Adventure	PS2, Wii, DS		
October 25	Worldwide Soccer Manager 2008	WIN		
October 26	Tomb Raider: Anniversary (EU)	XB360, PSP		
October 28	Guitar Hero III: Legends of Rock	PS2, XB360, PS3, Wii		
October 29	Battalion Wars 2	Wii		
October 29	Cars Mater-National Championship	WIN, PS2, XB360, PS3, DS		
October 29	El Tigre: The Adventures of Manny Rivera	PS2, DS		
October 29	John Woo Presents Stranglehold	PS3		
October 29	Ratatouille: Food Frenzy	DS		
October 29	Stranglehold	PS3		
October 30	Avencast: Rise of the Mage	WIN		
October 30	Bee Movie Game	WIN, PS2, XB360, DS		
October 30	Ben 10: Protector of Earth	PS2, Wii, DS, PSP		
October 30	Hooked! Real Motion Fishing	Wii		
October 30	Manhunt 2	PS2, PSP, Wii		
October 30	Napoleon Dynamite: The Game	DS, PSP		
October 30	Naruto: Rise of a Ninja	XB360		
October 30	NBA Live 08	WIN		
October 30	The Simpsons Game	PS2, XB360, PS3, Wii, DS		
October 30	The Witcher	WIN		
October 30	TimeShift	WIN, XB360		
October 30	Virtua Fighter 5	XB360		
October 30	Viva Piñata: Party Animals	XB360		
October 31	Hellgate: London	WIN		
October 31	Pirates of the Caribbean Online	WIN		
November 2	Tabula Rasa	WIN		
November 2	Tomb Raider: Anniversary (AU)	XB360, PSP		
November 5	Aqua Teen Hunger Force Zombie Ninja Pro-Am	PS2		
November 5	Bee Movie Game	Wii		
November 5	Call of Duty 4: Modern Warfare	WIN, XB360, PS3		
November 5	Call of Duty 4: Modern Warfare (handheld)	DS		
November 5	Fire Emblem: Radiant Dawn	Wii		
November 5	Shrek: Ogres and Dronkeys	DS		
November 5	The Simpsons Game	PSP		
November 6	Bladestorm: The Hundred Years' War	PS3, XB360		
November 6	Dragon Quest Monsters: Joker	DS		
November 6	F.E.A.R. Files	XB360		
November 6	F.E.A.R. Perseus Mandate	WIN		
November 6	Gears of War	WIN		
November 6	Hannah Montana: Spotlight World Tour	Wii		
November 6	Hot Wheels: Beat That!	DS		
November 6	Lego Star Wars: The Complete Saga (NA)	XB360, PS3, Wii, DS		
November 6	LifeSigns: Surgical Unit	DS		
November 6	Mario & Sonic at the Olympic Games	Wii		
November 6	Ontamarama	DS		
November 6	Power Rangers: Super Legends	PS2, WIN		
November 6	Silent Hill: Origins	PSP		
November 6	SOCOM U.S. Navy SEALs: Tactical Strike	PSP		
November 6	Supreme Commander: Forged Alliance	WIN		
November 7	Dr. Seuss: How The Grinch Stole Christmas!	DS		
November 7	Switchball	XB360		
November 9	Cooking Mama 2: Dinner with Friends	DS		
November 9	Empire Earth III	WIN		
November 12	Avatar: The Last Airbender – The Burning Earth	XB360		
November 12	Cars Mater-National Championship	Wii, GBA		
November 12	Foster's Home for Imaginary Friends: Imagination Invaders	DS, PS2, Wii		
November 12	SpongeBob's Atlantis SquarePantis	Wii		
November 12	Super Mario Galaxy	Wii		
November 12	Ultimate Mortal Kombat	DS		
November 13	Aliens vs. Predator: Requiem	PSP		
November 13	Beowulf: The Game	PS3, WIN, XB360		
November 13	Contra 4	DS		
November 13	Dragon Ball Z Budokai Tenkaichi 3	PS2		
November 13	Enchanted	DS		
November 13	Guitar Hero III: Legends of Rock	WIN		
November 13	Jenga World Tour	DS		
November 13	Kane & Lynch: Dead Men	PS3, WIN, XB360		
November 13	Medal of Honor: Heroes 2	Wii		
November 13	Metal Gear Solid: Portable Ops Plus	PSP		
November 13	Rayman Raving Rabbids 2	Wii, DS		
November 13	Resident Evil: The Umbrella Chronicles	Wii		
November 13	Smarty Pants	Wii		
November 13	Sonic Rivals 2	PSP		
November 13	The King of Fighters XI	PS2		
November 13	Tomb Raider: Anniversary	Wii		
November 13	WWE SmackDown vs. Raw 2008	DS, GBA, GCN, PS2, PS3, PSP, Wii, XB, XB360		
November 14	Need for Speed: ProStreet	Wii, DS, PS2, PS3, PSP, XB360, XB, WIN		
November 14	Shrek n' Roll	XB360		
November 14	Soldier of Fortune: Payback	WIN, XB360, PS3		
November 14	Thrillville: Off the Rails	PS3		
November 15	Crysis	WIN		
November 15	Orcs & Elves	DS		
November 16	Assassin's Creed	XB360, PS3		
November 16	Code Lyoko: Quest for Infinity	Wii		
November 16	Hot Wheels: Beat That!	WIN		
November 16	Juiced 2: Hot Import Nights	WIN		
November 16	Lego Star Wars: The Complete Saga (EU)	Wii, DS		
November 16	SimCity Societies	WIN		
November 19	Link's Crossbow Training	Wii		
November 19	Mario Party DS	DS		
November 19	Sega Rally Revo	WIN		
November 19	Uncharted: Drake's Fortune	PS3		
November 19	Unreal Tournament 3	WIN		
November 20	7 Wonders of the Ancient World	PS2		
November 20	Aqua Vita	PS3		
November 20	CSI: Dark Motives	DS		
November 20	Final Fantasy XII: Revenant Wings	DS		
November 20	Ghost Squad	Wii		
November 20	Godzilla Unleashed: Double Smash	DS		
November 20	Godzilla: Unleashed	PS2		
November 20	Mass Effect	XB360		
November 20	Operation Creature Feature	PSN		
November 20	Phantasy Star Universe: Ambition of the Illuminis	PS2, WIN, XB360		
November 20	Rock Band	PS3, XB360		
November 20	Soulcalibur Legends	Wii		
November 20	Star Trek: Conquest	PS2, Wii		
November 20	Time Crisis 4	PS3		
November 20	Trauma Center: New Blood	Wii		
November 21	Undertow	XB360		
November 23	Geometry Wars: Galaxies	DS		
November 26	Master of Illusion	DS		
November 27	Boogie	DS		
November 27	Cruis'n	Wii		
November 27	Geometry Wars: Galaxies	Wii		
November 27	Speedball 2 Tournament	WIN		
November 30	Puzzle Quest: Challenge of the Warlords	Wii		
December 1	Tomb Raider: Anniversary	MOBI		
December 3	18 Wheels of Steel: American Long Haul	WIN		
December 3	Dragon Ball Z: Budokai Tenkaichi 3	Wii		
December 3	Ultimate Duck Hunting	Wii		
December 4	Alvin and the Chipmunks	DS, PS2, Wii, WIN		
December 4	Beowulf: The Game	PSP		
December 4	Draglade	DS		
December 4	Psychonauts	XB360		
December 4	The Golden Compass	DS, PS2, PS3, Wii, XB360		
December 5	Godzilla: Unleashed	Wii		
December 6	High Velocity Bowling	PS3		
December 6	Lost Odyssey	XB360		
December 7	Jenga World Tour	Wii		
December 10	Guitar Hero III: Legends of Rock	OS X		
December 11	Half-Life 2	PS3		
December 11	Half-Life 2: Episode One	PS3		
December 11	Half-Life 2: Episode Two	PS3		
December 11	NeoGeo Battle Coliseum	PS2		
December 11	Portal	PS3		
December 11	Super Swing Golf: Season 2	Wii		
December 11	Team Fortress 2	PS3		
December 11	The Orange Box	PS3		
December 11	Winter Sports: The Ultimate Challenge	PS2, Wii, WIN		
December 12	Arkadian Warriors	WIN, XB360		
December 12	Universe at War: Earth Assault	WIN		
December 18	Indianapolis 500 Legends	DS, Wii		
December 18	Nights: Journey of Dreams	Wii		
December 18	Sonic the Hedgehog	iOS		
December 19	Elements of Destruction	DS		
December 26	SpongeBob SquarePants: Underpants Slam	XB360		

== Video game-based film and television releases ==
Title	Date	Director	Distributor(s)	Franchise	Original game publisher	Ref.
Chasing Ghosts: Beyond the Arcade	January 22, 2007	Lincoln Ruchti	—N/a	—N/a	—N/a	
Blue Dragon	April 7, 2007	Yukihiro Matsushita	Pierrot	Blue Dragon	Xbox Game Studios	
Devil May Cry: The Animated Series	June 14, 2007	Shin Itagaki	Madhouse, Inc.	Devil May Cry	Capcom	
The Rise of Darkrai	July 14, 2007	Kunihiko Yuyama	Toho	Pokémon	Game Freak	
The King of Kong	August 17, 2007	Seth Gordon	Picturehouse	—N/a	—N/a	
Tak and the Power of Juju	August 31, 2007	Nick Jennings	Nickelodeon	Tak and the Power of Juju	THQ	
Resident Evil: Extinction	September 21, 2007	Russell Mulcahy	Sony Pictures Motion Picture Group	Resident Evil	Capcom	
Press Start	September 25, 2007	Ed Glaser	Dark Maze Studios	—N/a	—N/a	
Ben X	September 26, 2007	Nic Balthazar	MMG Film	—N/a	—N/a	
Hitman	November 21, 2007	Xavier Gens	20th Century Studios	Hitman	IO Interactive	

== See also ==
- 2007 in esports
- 2007 in games
