= List of tennis video games =

The following is a list of all tennis-based sports video games ordered by release year.

== Franchises ==
- Mario Tennis
- The Prince of Tennis
- Virtua Tennis
- Top Spin

== Legend ==
Video game platforms
| AMI | Amiga | Arcade | Arcade video game | ATR | Atari 8-bit computers |
| ATR26 | Atari 2600, Atari 2800 | ATR52 | Atari 5200 | ATRST | Atari ST, Atari Falcon |
| C64 | Commodore 64 | CLV | ColecoVision, Coleco Adam | DC | Dreamcast |
| DOS | PC DOS / MS-DOS, Windows 3.X | DROID | Android | DS | Nintendo DS, DSiWare, iQue DS |
| FMT | FM Towns | GBA | Game Boy Advance, iQue GBA | GBC | Game Boy Color |
| GEN | Genesis / Mega Drive | GG | Game Gear | iOS | iOS, iPhone, iPod, iPadOS, iPad, visionOS, Apple Vision Pro |
| Luna | Amazon Luna | N64 | Nintendo 64, iQue Player | NES | Nintendo Entertainment System / Famicom |
| NGE | N-Gage | NGPC | Neo Geo Pocket Color | NX | (replace with NS) |
| NX2 | (replace with NS2) | ODY | Magnavox Odyssey | PC98 | PC-9800 series |
| PCE | TurboGrafx-16 / PC Engine | PS1 | PlayStation 1 | PS2 | PlayStation 2 |
| PS3 | PlayStation 3 | PS4 | PlayStation 4 | PSP | PlayStation Portable |
| SAT | Sega Saturn | SMS | Master System | SNES | Super NES / Super Famicom / Super Comboy |
| Wii | Wii, WiiWare, Wii Virtual Console | WIN | Windows, all versions Windows 95 and up | XB360 | Xbox 360, Xbox 360 Live Arcade |
| XBO | Xbox One | ZX | ZX Spectrum | | |

== Games ==
| Title | Release date | Platform | Developer | Publisher | Ref. |
|---|---|---|---|---|---|
| Tennis for Two | 1958 | Analog computer | William Higinbotham | —N/a | |
| Pong | 1972 | Arcade | Atari, Inc. | | |
| Tennis | 1972 | ODY | Sanders Associates | Magnavox | |
| Tennis | 1981 | ATR26 | Activision | | |
| RealSports Tennis | 1983 | ATR26, ATR52, ATR | Atari, Inc. | | |
| Match Point | 1984 | CLV, C64, ZX | D&L Research | Psion Software | |
| On-Court Tennis | 1984 | C64 | Gamestar | Activision | |
| Tennis | 1984 | NES | Nintendo R&D1 / Intelligent Systems | Nintendo | |
| Grand Slam: World Class Tennis | 1986 | AMI | Infinity Software | Infinity Software | |
| Racket Attack | 1988 | NES | Tose | Jaleco | |
| 4D Sports Tennis | 1990 | DOS, FMT, PC98 | Distinctive Software | Mindscape | |
| Advantage Tennis | 1990 | AMI, ATRST, DOS | Infogrames | | |
| Final Match Tennis | 1991 | PCE | Human Entertainment | | |
| Super Tennis | 1991 | SNES | Tose | Tonkin House | |
| Andre Agassi Tennis | 1992 | SMS, GG, GEN, SNES | TecMagik | | |
| Jennifer Capriati Tennis | 1992 | GEN | System Sacom | Telenet Japan | |
| Wimbledon | 1992 | SMS, GG | SIMS | Sega | |
| Aim for the Ace! | 1993 | SNES | Telenet Japan | | |
| Wimbledon II | 1993 | SMS | SIMS | Sega | |
| IMG International Tour Tennis | 1994 | GEN | High Score Productions | EA Sports | |
| Pete Sampras Tennis | 1994 | GEN, GG | Zeppelin Games | Codemasters | |
| ATP Tour Championship Tennis | 1995 | GEN | SIMS Co., Ltd. | Sega | |
| Power Serve 3D Tennis | 1995 | PS1 | SPS | Kovax | |
| Sampras Tennis 96 | 1995 | GEN | Codemasters | | |
| Virtual Open Tennis | 1995 | SAT | Imagineer | | |
| Pete Sampras Tennis '97 | 1997 | WIN, DOS, PS1 | Codemasters | | |
| All Star Tennis '99 | 1998 | N64, PS1, GBC | Smart Dog | Ubisoft | |
| Anna Kournikova's Smash Court Tennis | 1998 | PS1 | Namco | | |
| Centre Court Tennis | 1998 | N64 | Hudson Soft | | |
| Extreme Tennis | 1998 | WIN | Hammer Technologies | Head Games Publishing | |
| Game, Net & Match | 1998 | WIN | Media Games | Blue Byte | |
| Pocket Tennis Color | 1999 | NGPC | Yumekobo | SNK | |
| Virtua Tennis | 1999 | Arcade, DC, WIN, GBA, NGE | Sega AM3 | Sega | |
| Agassi Tennis Generation | 2002 | WIN, PS2, GBA | Aqua Pacific | DreamCatcher Interactive | |
| Davis Cup Tennis | 2002 | GBA | Hokus Pokus Games | Ubisoft | |
| Hard Hitter Tennis | 2002 | PS2 | Magical Company | | |
| Smash Court Tennis Pro Tournament | 2002 | Arcade, PS2 | Namco | | |
| Smash Court Tennis Pro Tournament 2 | 2004 | PS2 | Now Production | SCE | |
| XaviX Tennis | 2004 | XaviXPORT | SSD Company Limited | SSD Company Limited | |
| Everybody's Tennis | 2006 | PS2 | Clap Hanz | SCE | |
| Rafa Nadal Tennis | 2006 | DS | Virtual Toys | Codemasters | |
| Wii Sports | 2006 | Wii | Nintendo EAD | Nintendo | |
| Grand Slam Tennis | 2009 | Wii | EA Canada | EA Sports | |
| Everybody's Tennis Portable | 2010 | PSP | Clap Hanz | SCE | |
| Top Spin 4 | 2011 | PS3, Wii, XB360 | 2K Czech | 2K | |
| Grand Slam Tennis 2 | 2012 | PS3, XB360 | EA Canada | EA Sports | |
| Stick Tennis | 2012 | DROID, iOS | Stick Sports | | |
| AO Tennis | 2018 | PS4, XBO, iOS, DROID, WIN | Big Ant Studios | | |
| AO Tennis 2 | 2018 | WIN, NX, PS4, XBO, Luna | Big Ant Studios | Nacon | |
| Super Tennis Blast | 2019 | WIN, NX, PS4, XBO | Unfinished Pixel | | |
| Dino Galaxy Tennis | 2021 | WIN, NX | Vixa Games | | |
| Nintendo Switch Sports | 2022 | NX | Nintendo EPD | Nintendo | |
| TopSpin 2K25 | 2024 | WIN, PS4, PS5, XBO, XBXS | Hangar 13 | 2K | |
| Nintendo Switch Sports Resort | 2026 | NX2 | Nintendo EPD | Nintendo | |

== See also ==
- Sports game
