= Tour Championship (disambiguation) =

The Tour Championship is an annual golf tournament that is part of the PGA Tour.

Tour Championship may also refer to:

== Bowling ==
- PWBA Tour Championship, in women's bowling

== Golf ==
=== Asia ===
- Japan Golf Tour Championship
- Japan LPGA Tour Championship
- KPGA Tour Championship, in Korea, defunct since 2018

=== Europe ===
- Challenge Tour Championship, in Europe, defunct since 2002
- ECCO Tour Championship, in Denmark, defunct since 2012
- MCB Tour Championship, part of the European Senior Tour
- Seniors Tour Championship, in Europe, contested 2000–2010

=== United States ===
- CME Group Tour Championship, current season-ending event of the LPGA Tour
- Epson Tour Championship, part of the LPGA's developmental tour
- Korn Ferry Tour Championship, season-ending tournament of the Korn Ferry Tour
- LPGA Tour Championship, contested in 2009 and 2010, replaced by the CME Group Tour Championship
- Senior Tour Championship, now known as the Charles Schwab Cup Championship

=== Elsewhere ===
- ANZ Tour Championship, in Australia, defunct since 2004
- The Tour Championship (Sunshine Tour), established in 2018 in South Africa
  - Sunshine Tour Championship, contested 2001–2010 in South Africa
- Tour Championship of Canada, established 2002

== Snooker ==
- Tour Championship (snooker), established in Wales in 2019
- Players Tour Championship, now defunct

== Tennis ==
- WTA Tour Championship, in tennis, now known as the WTA Finals
- ATP Tour Championship Tennis, a video game released in 1994

== See also ==
- The Championship Tour, a 2018 rap tour in North America
- Nestea European Championship Tour, in beach volleyball
