= Mario Party 8 =

2007 video game

- North American box art
- Developer: Hudson Soft
- Publisher: Nintendo
- Directors: Shuichiro Nishiya; Kenji Kikuchi
- Producers: Hiroshi Sato; Atsushi Ikeda
- Designer: Saori Tsutsui
- Programmer: Hideki Sahashi
- Composer: Yoshihiro Tsukahara
- Series: Mario Party
- Platform: Wii
- Release: NA: May 29, 2007; EU: June 22, 2007; AU: July 19, 2007; JP: July 26, 2007; UK: August 3, 2007
- Genre: Party
- Modes: Single-player, multiplayer

Mario Party 8 is a 2007 party video game developed by Hudson Soft and published by Nintendo for the Wii. It is the eighth main installment in the Mario Party series, as well as the first title in the series to be released for the Wii. The game was released in North America on May 29, 2007, Europe on June 22, 2007, Australia on July 19, 2007, Japan on July 26, 2007, and the United Kingdom on August 3, 2007.

Like previous Mario Party titles, Mario Party 8 features up to four characters from the Mario franchise, controlled by human players or artificial intelligence, competing in a board game interspersed with minigames. The game features a single-player story mode as well as several other game modes.

Mario Party 8 received mixed reviews, with critics praising the inclusion of motion controls but voicing disapproval of its outdated visuals and single-player gameplay. The game has sold more than eight million copies, making it the 12th-best-selling game for the Wii. Mario Party 8 was succeeded by Mario Party DS, a handheld game for the Nintendo DS, the same year of its release.

Three Japan-exclusive arcade video games based on Mario Party 8 were developed by Capcom: Mario Party Fushigi no Korokoro Catcher (2009), Mario Party Kurukuru Carnival (2012), and Mario Party Fushigi no Korokoro Catcher 2 (2013).

== Gameplay ==
Mario Party 8 is hosted by two new characters: MC Ballyhoo and his talking top hat, Big Top. During the standard game, four different characters compete on one of six themed game boards. When playing with fewer than four people, players select which characters the computer will control, as well as their difficulty levels and handicaps. The game has fourteen playable characters: Mario, Luigi, Toad, Princess Daisy, Yoshi, Birdo, Princess Peach, Toadette, Wario, Waluigi, Boo, Dry Bones, Blooper, and Hammer Bro, with the latter two being unlockable. Players also have the ability to play as their Mii characters created using the Wii's Mii Channel.

Players are given the choice of five different areas: the Party Tent, Star Battle Arena, the Minigame Tent, the Extras Zone, and the Fun Bazaar. The Party Tent allows characters to compete on boards in three types of battles: Battle Royale (four-player competition; one to four players), Tag Battle (two-vs. two; one to four players), or Duel Battle (one-on-one; one to two players).

In the Star Battle Arena mode, one player faces off against one opponent on each board in which when they get to the last board, Bowser will take the Star from the player and they will face against Hammer Bro or Blooper (who become playable characters once defeated) in Bowser's Warped Orbit, then once they defeat the character, Bowser will give back the Star Rod and the player will face off in a final minigame called Superstar Showdown. When they win the battle, the player wins the game. In the Minigame Tent, players can play several non-board challenges from the minigames. The Extras Zone has the eight extra minigames that do not appear in board-play. These could be played with Miis saved in the Mii Channel in addition to Mario franchise characters. Finally, the Fun Bazaar has the player use their carnival cards to unlock minigames and other surprises. In the Fun Bazaar, the player can use their carnival cards to purchase in-game music and character voices. Minigame records can also be viewed here. For general board-play modes, players take 10 to 50 turns rolling dice and moving across the game board, with the goal being to getting as many Stars as possible within the allotted turn limit.

Toward the end of the game, during the last five turns, gameplay is altered slightly. This can include events such as candy or coins being awarded to the player in last place, as well as additional coins being placed on each space. After the game has ended, three Bonus Stars (which can be enabled or disabled as a game option) may be awarded to players for various feats during play. Finally, the player with the most Stars is declared the winner, with the number of coins possessed used as a tiebreaker.

Additional game modes allow players to directly compete in minigames without making use of the game board. Several of these modes tie a number of minigames together, with each minigame won moving the winning player closer to victory.

=== Boards ===
Luigi navigating the Koopa's Tycoon Town board

While some of the game boards are classic Mario Party in nature, with players attempting to reach locations where they can buy a Star for 20 coins (10 coins in King Boo's Haunted Hideaway and free in Goomba's Booty Boardwalk due to the distance required to reach the star), others are more varied. For example, "Koopa's Tycoon Town" involves players investing coins into hotels (akin to Monopoly) in order to earn Stars, with each hotel only providing Stars to the player with the highest current investment.

As always, all boards include a number of elements which can greatly influence the course of the game. Notable for this is "Shy Guy's Perplex Express", where the train cars which make up the game board can be re-ordered as the result of landing on a certain space, potentially changing the relative positions of all players.

=== Candies ===
Candy is the new item that is introduced in Mario Party 8. There are fourteen candies in all and each one has a different ability. For example, the Twice Candy allows the player to hit two Dice Blocks instead of one, while the Thrice Candy uses three.

=== Minigames ===
At least once per turn, the game has the players take part in a minigame. A number of the minigames rely on the unique capabilities of the Wii Remote, while others instead require players to hold the controller sideways and use only the buttons. There are 73 minigames in Mario Party 8, of eight types: 4-player free-for-all, 1-vs.-3, 2-vs.-2, Battle, Duel, Challenge, Extra, and Last.

== Development ==
Like previous Mario Party titles, Mario Party 8 was developed by Hudson Soft. It was announced in September 2006 at an event held by Nintendo, where it was announced as one of several games to be released for the then-upcoming Wii. Later that year, a demo of the game was shown with six sample minigames at the Nintendo World trade show.

Mario Party 8 had three Japan-only arcade video games based upon it, borrowing mini-games and other assets such as game boards. The three titles are Mario Party Fushigi no Korokoro Catcher (2009), Mario Party Kurukuru Carnival (2012), and Mario Party Fushigi no Korokoro Catcher 2 (2013). All three games were developed by Capcom for the RVA-001, an arcade Wii-based platform.

== Release ==
Mario Party 8 is the last game in the Mario Party series to be developed by Hudson Soft; all subsequent titles, with the exception of the handheld installment Mario Party DS, have been developed by Nintendo Cube. The game was published by Nintendo and released in North America on May 29, in Europe on June 22, in Australia on July 19, and in Japan on July 26.

=== Recall ===
The game experienced a launch plagued by difficulties in the United Kingdom. Originally scheduled for release on June 22, 2007, Nintendo announced on June 19, 2007, that the British version had been delayed to July 13, 2007, due to a "production issue". Furthermore, upon release on July 13, 2007, it was then immediately recalled. In a press release, Nintendo gave the reason for the withdrawal as an assembly error, but some retailers were reporting that it was supposedly withdrawn from shelves because some copies included the word "spastic", used by Magikoopa in "Shy Guy's Perplex Express", which is considered a highly offensive slur against disabled people in British English. Just one month before, Ubisoft had the PSP game Mind Quiz pulled from the shelves because of the same word. The game was eventually re-released in the United Kingdom on August 3, 2007, with the word "erratic" used instead. A spokesperson from Nintendo said "The offending word has been replaced at code level and the software reproduced. We are confident we have taken the correct appropriate levels and action necessary and in all new versions of the game there are no issues – however we cannot 100 percent guarantee that every copy of the initial batch was returned to us and as such there may still be a small number of copies of the game in circulation." Nintendo also confirmed that there would be no change on pricing and stock levels would "remain unaffected for the re-launch."

== Reception ==
=== Critical response ===
Reception

Aggregate score
Aggregator	Score
Metacritic	62/100

Review scores
Publication	Score
1Up.com	C
Destructoid	6.3/10
Edge	4/10
Electronic Gaming Monthly	6.33/10
Eurogamer	4/10
Game Informer	7.25/10
GamePro	4.5/5
GameRevolution	2/10
GameSpot	6.5/10
GameSpy	3/5
GamesRadar+	3.5/5
GameTrailers	8.3/10
IGN	5.2/10
Nintendo Power	7.5/10
Nintendo World Report	6/10
Common Sense Media	4/5
Digital Spy	2/5

Mario Party 8 received "mixed or average reviews", according to the review aggregation website Metacritic.

Common Sense Media reviewer Erin Bell gave the game a score of four out of five stars, writing, "Still a good kids' party game, now Wii fun!" GamePro's The Grim Wiiper said, "We all knew when the Wii launched that it would be a strong first-party system. The third-party stuff, while interesting, hasn't exactly set the world on fire and Wii owners have been waiting patiently--or not so patiently--for Nintendo to throw open their front doors, Willy Wonka-style, and introduce us to the next magical first-party game."

In contrast, Matt Casamassina of IGN referred to the single-player mode as "torture" and said that the "graphics don't even impress as a GCN title". 1UP.com critic Dan Hsu did not enjoy the game either, and criticized its needless dialogue, repetitive cut-scenes and minigames, stating: "Mario Party 8 could've used a lot more of that creativity, however, throughout the whole game. Instead, we get a really disappointing (but, as mentioned at the start of this review, inevitably still entertaining) Wii debut for the series. Perhaps the next game will truly take advantage of the Wii controls through and through."

Morakoth Tang of 411Mania gave the game a score of six out of ten, saying, "I can not recommend this game for a single player experience. If you want this game so you can share it with friends and family who have played it before then Mario Party fits the bill perfectly. I know its [sic] going to sell millions and millions of copies like its predecessors, but quality as a whole is a bit disappointing." However, Cory Moore of the same website gave it seven out of ten and said that it "seems more like a transition game to see what works and what doesn't, but a well-executed transition game nevertheless." Digital Spy's David Gibbon gave it two stars out of five, saying that it was "essentially a GameCube title ported over to the Wii with some last minute remote controls added. If you like the series, then you will probably enjoy much of what this has to offer, but Nintendo really need to do better next time if they want to have Wii gamers falling at their feet."

The decision to keep the game in the 4:3 aspect ratio and add sidebars in widescreen was widely panned as lazy, as well as potentially causing burn-in. Many critics theorized that the game was originally meant to release for the GameCube, but was ported to the Wii late into development.

=== Sales ===
After its North American release on May 29, 2007, the game sold 314,000 units in the United States in three days, making it the best-selling home console game in the month of May and the second-best selling game overall. In late June, the game sold 426,000 units, making it the best-selling game of the month, and on July 2, Nintendo of America announced that the game had sold over 550,000 copies since its release, making it the fastest-selling entry in the series. According to The NPD Group, the game was the tenth best-selling game of 2007 in the US, with 1.82 million units sold. In January 2008, Famitsu reported that Mario Party 8 had sold 1,153,648 copies, making it one of four Wii games that had surpassed sales of one million units and the third best-selling Wii game behind Wii Sports (2,663,938 units) and Wii Play (2,139,084 units). According to GameDaily, the game was the tenth most-rented video game of 2008. It received a "Platinum" sales award from the Entertainment and Leisure Software Publishers Association (ELSPA), indicating sales of at least 300,000 copies in the United Kingdom. The game went on to sell 8.8 million copies worldwide, making it the 12th best-selling game for the Wii.

== See also ==
- List of Wii games
- List of party video games
- List of video games featuring Mario
- 2007 in video games
