= Grand Slam Tennis 2 =

2012 video game

- North American cover featuring John McEnroe, Novak Djokovic and Maria Sharapova
- Developer: EA Canada
- Publisher: EA Sports
- Platforms: PlayStation 3, Xbox 360
- Release: AU: February 9, 2012; EU: February 10, 2012; NA: February 14, 2012
- Genre: Sports (Tennis)
- Modes: Single-player, multiplayer

Grand Slam Tennis 2 is a tennis video game, developed by EA Canada, it was released for the PlayStation 3 and Xbox 360. A downloadable demo was released on January 10 for both platforms. It is the sequel to Grand Slam Tennis.

== Gameplay ==
The game features a control scheme, dubbed Total Racquet Control, giving players control of each shot with the right analog stick, with precision, accuracy, and power. The game features all four Grand Slams, including Wimbledon. The game supports the PlayStation Move, but does not support Kinect.

The game features a Career mode in which players create their own tennis player and take them through 10 years of tournaments, with the aim of being ranked number 1. Before each Grand Slam players have the opportunity to take part in training, an exhibition match or a minor tournament. Players earn points from matches and these points accumulate to increase the players ranking.

The game also features an ESPN Grand Slam Classics mode in which players relive classic moments from Grand Slam tournaments from the 1980s to the 2000s and Fantasy matches.

Although an online pass code is included in the game, EA confirmed that it would not be required to access online multiplayer due to "technical issues with the registration system".

Pat Cash provides commentary continuing his role from the prequel and analysis is provided by John McEnroe. The in-game music is provided by DJ Paul van Dyk, who wrote and produced all the tracks in the game.

== Reception ==
Reception

Aggregate score
Aggregator	Score	
Aggregator	PS3	Xbox 360
Metacritic	73/100	71/100

Review scores
Publication	Score	
Publication	PS3	Xbox 360
Eurogamer	7/10	N/A
Famitsu	29/40	N/A
Game Informer	8/10	8/10
GameRevolution	N/A	4/5
GameSpot	6.5/10	6.5/10
GameTrailers	N/A	7.5/10
GameZone	N/A	7.5/10
Giant Bomb	3/5	3/5
IGN	8.5/10	8.5/10
Official Xbox Magazine (US)	N/A	6/10
PlayStation: The Official Magazine	7/10	N/A
The Digital Fix	N/A	8/10
Metro	N/A	7/10

Grand Slam Tennis 2 received "average" reviews on both platforms according to the review aggregation website Metacritic. The game was praised for its presentation, HD graphics and control system, but was criticized mainly for its difficulty-changing career mode. New Game Network said that "GST2 has solid ball-thwacking mechanics and some killer drop shots, but in other areas the game feels a distant second best to Virtua Tennis 4". In Japan, where the PlayStation 3 version was ported for release on April 12, 2012, Famitsu gave it a score of three sevens and one eight for a total of 29 out of 40.
