= IMG International Tour Tennis =

1994 sports video game

- Developer: High Score Productions
- Publisher: EA Sports
- Platform: Sega Genesis
- Release: EU: September 23, 1994; NA: October 1994
- Genre: Sports (tennis)
- Modes: Single-player, multiplayer

IMG International Tour Tennis is a sports video game developed by High Score Productions and published by EA Sports for the Sega Genesis.

== Gameplay ==
IMG International Tour Tennis is a game that includes 17 stops for the tour and features 4 playing surfaces, and allows the player to choose from 32 professional tennis players.

== Development and release ==
IMG International Tour Tennis was developed by High Score Productions for publisher EA Sports and licensor IMG. It was designed by Happy Keller and programmed by Tom McWilliams, working under executive producer Scott Orr. IMG was released in Europe in September 1994 and in North America in October 1994. The game was EA's only foray into the sport until Grand Slam Tennis for the Wii in 2009.

== Reception ==
Reception

Review scores
| Publication | Score |
|---|---|
| AllGame | 2/5 |
| Computer and Video Games | 65/100 |
| Game Informer | 5/10 |
| Game Players | 73% |
| GamePro | 3.375/5 |
| Mean Machines Sega | 62/100 |
| Next Generation | 3/5 |
| Ação Games | 3/5 |
| Joypad | 89% |
| MAN!AC | 69% |
| Mega | 90% |
| Mega Fun | 70% |
| Mega Power | 80% |
| Player One | 71% |
| Play Time | 71/100 |
| Sega Power | 71% |
| Sega Pro | 91% |
| TodoSega | 89/100 |
| Video Games (DE) | 69% |
| VideoGames | 8/10 |

Next Generation reviewed the game, rating it three stars out of five, and stated that "Sim fans should go with IMG, and action fans should pick up ATP."

IMG won GameFan magazine's award for best tennis game of 1994.
