= Grand Slam: World Class Tennis =

1986 sports video game

- Developer: Infinity Software
- Publisher: Infinity Software
- Platforms: Macintosh, Amiga
- Release: 1986
- Genre: Sports

Grand Slam: World Class Tennis is a 1986 video game published by Infinity Software for Macintosh and Amiga.

== Development ==
Grand Slam: World Class Tennis was originally a simple tennis game developed by MacroMind. Former tennis professional Tom Maremaa bought the code and worked with two programmers to develop it into a full-featured tennis simulation. The game was initially released on Macintosh in 1986. An Amiga port was released later that year.

== Gameplay ==
Loading screen

Grand Slam: World Class Tennis is a game in which the Grand Slam tournament is played.

== Reception ==
Frank C. Boosman reviewed the game for Computer Gaming World, and stated that "I like to think of GS as a diamond in the rough: pretty, but even more so once it has been cut and polished."

David M. Wilson and Johnny L. Wilson reviewed the game for Computer Gaming World, and stated that "the action is where it is at and Grand Slam Tennis is an action game which is sophisticated enough to know that position is truly important in tennis."

MacUser awarded the game 4 out of 5 mice, saying the game succeeded "both as a simulation and a highly addictive game" despite occasionally choppy controls.

== See also ==
- List of tennis video games
