= Mario Party DS =

2007 video game

- North American packaging artwork
- Developer: Hudson Soft
- Publisher: Nintendo
- Director: Kouji Matsuura
- Producers: Hiroshi Sato; Atsushi Ikeda
- Designer: Yuka Sasaki
- Programmer: Hideki Nishimoto
- Artist: Akihiro Shibata
- Composers: Hironobu Yahata; Shinya Ohtouge
- Series: Mario Party
- Platform: Nintendo DS
- Release: JP: November 8, 2007; NA: November 19, 2007; EU: November 23, 2007; AU: December 6, 2007
- Genre: Party
- Modes: Single-player, multiplayer

Mario Party DS (Note: Japanese: マリオパーティDS, Hepburn: Mario Pāti DS) is a 2007 party video game developed by Hudson Soft and published by Nintendo for the Nintendo DS. It is the second handheld game in the Mario Party series, the only one to be released for the DS, and the last to be developed by Hudson Soft, as all subsequent titles have been developed by Nintendo Cube. The game was re-released on the Virtual Console for the Wii U in 2016.

Like most installments in the Mario Party series, Mario Party DS features characters from the Mario franchise competing in a board game with a variety of minigames, many of which utilize the console's unique features. Up to four human players can compete at a time, though playable characters can also be computer-controlled. The game features several game modes, including a single-player story mode.

Mario Party DS was released in Japan on November 8, 2007; in North America on November 19, 2007; in Europe on November 23, 2007; and in Australia on December 6, 2007. The game received mixed reviews, with general praise for its minigame variety and criticism for its absence of an online multiplayer mode, and has sold more than nine million units worldwide, making it the 11th-best-selling game for the Nintendo DS. Mario Party DS was succeeded by Mario Party 9 for the Wii in 2012.

== Gameplay ==
Much like other titles in the Mario Party series, Mario Party DS is a party video game that allows up to four players to compete in an interactive board game, rolling dice to move between one and ten spaces at a time. There are eight playable characters (Mario, Luigi, Princess Peach, Yoshi, Princess Daisy, Toad, Wario, and Waluigi) and five game boards. Characters can be controlled by human players as well as artificial intelligence (AI). There are four difficulty levels for computer-controlled characters: easy, medium, hard, and expert, with the lattermost difficulty being unlockable.

The players' objective is to collect more Stars than their opponents, though the method of obtaining them varies depending on the board. However, most Stars require coins to be purchased, which can be obtained by landing on certain spaces, as well as by winning minigames. Coins can also be spent on items to help players win. Once there are five turns remaining, an event known as the "Final 5 Frenzy" occurs in which Bowser aids the player in last place by giving them coins or a Star, depending on the outcome of a roulette. This event also adds spaces that allow two players to duel for Stars or coins via a minigame. At the end of each board game, the player with the most Stars is crowned the "Superstar". Additional Stars based on randomly selected criteria (such as winning the most minigames or using the most items) are awarded post-game if Bonus Stars are enabled.

Three playable characters (Luigi, Wario, and Princess Daisy) competing in the 1-vs.-3 minigame "Fast Food Frenzy"

Mario Party DS includes a total of 73 minigames, most of which utilize the unique features of the Nintendo DS. While some minigames simply use the buttons and D-pad, others make use of the console's built-in microphone or dual screen and touchscreen mechanics. Each minigame is a short event that rewards players with coins for completing an objective. During board games, a minigame is automatically played every time each player has taken a turn, as well as whenever a "Duel Space" is landed on. The type of minigame played depends on the color of the space each player lands on. Mario Party DS's minigames are categorized into five types, including four-player free-for-alls, teams of two, and three against one. There are also "battle" minigames in which all players compete for a communal jackpot, as well as five "boss" minigames in which villains from the Mario franchise, such as Bowser, are fought.

Mario Party DS features a single-player story game mode wherein all of the playable characters are significantly shrunken down. This detail is reflected in the game boards and minigames, in which characters ride rubber ducks, drive wind-up cars, and glide across a backyard on clothes hangers. To complete the story mode, the player must defeat three other characters, all of whom are randomly selected and computer-controlled, on all five game boards, in addition to clearing all five boss minigames.

There is also a "Party Mode" that allows up to four players, human or computer-controlled, to compete on any of the five game boards, either independently or in opposing pairs. Unlike with "Story Mode", the number of turns, the difficulty levels of the computer-controlled characters, and the number of Stars each player starts the game with can all be adjusted. "Minigame Mode" allows players to play any minigames that have been unlocked by playing through Story Mode and Party Mode. A "Free Play" option allows any minigame to be played at any time; there are also five other game modes with different rulesets. Most of these game modes allow up to four players to play minigames that are either randomly selected, manually chosen, or part of a predetermined set. One of the game modes, "Boss Bash", is a single-player challenge in which one player must complete all five boss minigames as quickly as possible. "Puzzle Mode" allows players to play puzzle games from previous installments of the Mario Party series: "Mario's Puzzle Party" from Mario Party 3 (2000), "Bob-omb Breakers" from Mario Party 4 (2002), "Piece Out" from Mario Party 5 (2003), "Block Star" from Mario Party 6 (2004), and "Stick and Spin" from Mario Party 7 (2005). A new game, "Triangle Twisters", can be unlocked by completing the story mode for the first time. "Extras Mode" features two additional game modes, wherein players can either work together or compete against one another.

Mario Party DS introduces a mechanic known as "Mario Party Points", which can be accumulated based on a variety of conditions, such as performance in minigames, and used to unlock collectibles like figurines and trophies. Collectibles can also be unlocked in various other ways, such as completing the story mode with different characters, playing on specific game boards, and clearing one of the boss minigames a certain number of times. Players can view any collectibles they have unlocked and listen to in-game audio – including music, jingles, and character voices – in the game's gallery.

Although Mario Party DS lacks an online multiplayer mode, the game supports local multiplayer, with the Nintendo DS's Download Play functionality enabling up to four people to play together wirelessly using only one game card.

== Plot ==
One night in the Mushroom Kingdom, five crystals known as Sky Crystals fall to the ground. One of the crystals is found by Mario, who shows it to all of his friends the following day. Suddenly, Kamek flies overhead, dropping party invitations from Bowser, inviting everyone to a feast in his castle to apologize for his villainy. Although the gang is initially suspicious, they travel to Bowser's castle anyway, only to be trapped by Bowser, who steals Mario's Sky Crystal. Bowser also uses a device known as the Minimizer to shrink Mario and his friends down to minuscule size. Bowser, planning to find the four other Sky Crystals on his own, orders Kamek to throw the pint-sized heroes out to a distant location.

The crew treks back to Bowser's castle, recovering the four remaining Sky Crystals along the way by defeating a Piranha Plant in Wiggler's garden, stopping a Hammer Bro from destroying Toadette's musical instruments in her music room, helping Diddy Kong free DK after the latter was turned to stone by a Dry Bones, and freeing a Koopa Troopa's grandfather, whom Kamek had trapped within a book.

Once the heroes make it to Bowser's castle, he traps everyone inside his pinball machine before preparing to use the Minimizer to shrink them even more. However, DK and Diddy, who also received an invitation to the castle, arrive looking for food. DK bumps into Bowser, causing him to drop the Minimizer, which DK then steps on and breaks, returning Mario and his friends to their rightful sizes.

In a last-ditch attempt to defeat the heroes, Bowser uses another device, known as the Megamorph Belt, to transform into several different forms made up of blocks, initiating another boss minigame. After defeating Bowser, the crew takes back the stolen Sky Crystal. The crystals connect to form a crystal DS, unlocking a new game mode, "Triangle Twisters" (if Story Mode has not already been cleared). In a surprising move, Mario and his friends invite Bowser and his son Bowser Jr. to play Triangle Twisters with them. They accept the offer, making everyone happy, including DK and Diddy Kong, who have eaten the entire buffet.

== Development and release ==
Like almost all (Note: Mario Party-e, a 2003 card game for the Game Boy Advance that makes optional use of the console's Nintendo e-Reader, was developed by indieszero.) games in the Mario Party series prior to Mario Party 9 (2012), Mario Party DS was developed by Hudson Soft and published by Nintendo. The game was not showcased at Nintendo's E3 2007 press conference, though a short trailer revealed that up to four people could play wirelessly with only one game cartridge.

Mario Party DS was released in 2007 as the second handheld game in the Mario Party series; the first handheld title, Mario Party Advance, was released for the Game Boy Advance in 2005. Mario Party DS is the only game in the series to be released for the Nintendo DS, though several Mario Party games were later released for the Nintendo 3DS. It is also the last game in the series to be developed by Hudson Soft, as all subsequent titles have been developed by Nintendo Cube.

Mario Party DS was succeeded by Mario Party 9 for the Wii in 2012. The game was re-released on the Virtual Console for the Wii U in April 2016.

== Reception ==
=== Critical response ===
Reception

Aggregate score
Aggregator	Score
Metacritic	72/100

Review scores
Publication	Score
Eurogamer	4/10
Famitsu	7/10, 8/10, 9/10, 9/10
Game Informer	7/10
GamePro	3.75/5
GameRevolution	B
GameSpot	8/10
GameSpy	4/5
IGN	(AU) 7.3/10 (US) 7/10
Nintendo Life	6/10
Nintendo World Report	7.5/10
Pocket Gamer	4/5
VideoGamer.com	6/10

Mario Party DS received "mixed or average" reviews from critics, according to the review aggregation website Metacritic. In Japan, four critics from Famitsu gave the game a total score of 33 out of 40. The minigame variety was generally praised, while criticism was largely directed at the lack of Wi-Fi connection, which heavily restricted the multiplayer aspect. Several reviews alluded to Mario Party DS being superior to its predecessor, Mario Party 8 (2007). IGN's Patrick Kolan and Craig Harris summarized the game as "a worthwhile party outing for gamers who are new to the series" and "a solid multiplayer mini-game experience with a lot of the flaws of the previous versions", respectively.

The variety in Mario Party DS's minigame control schemes was consistently praised by critics. Some reviewers expressed concern toward certain minigames requiring usage of the console's built-in microphone, though several critics also complimented the ability to exclude such minigames from normal play if desired. Critical reception toward the design and pacing of the minigames was more mixed; GameSpot's Frank Provo stated that a majority of the minigames were engaging, Game Informer's Bryan Vore wrote that they were "suitably amusing", and Eurogamer's Ellie Gibson described them as "too simplistic, over too quickly or simply too dull to be enjoyable", as well as "badly designed and boring".

Mario Party DS's additional game modes also attracted a mostly positive response from critics, particularly Puzzle Mode, despite most of the puzzles originating from prior entries in the Mario Party series. Nintendo Life's Dave Frear, in a review of the Wii U's Virtual Console version of the game, referred to these puzzles as "quite addictive", while Ellie Gibson of Eurogamer stated that the puzzle games were more entertaining than the actual board game. Michael Cole of Nintendo World Report offered a less positive response toward the puzzle games, describing them as "simplistic and cumbersome".

The game's single-player focus and absence of an online multiplayer mode were widely panned by critics, especially due to the inclusion of an online mode in Mario Kart DS (2005), which had been released two years earlier. However, Mario Party DS's local multiplayer aspect was generally complimented. The game's artificial intelligence was also poorly received, particularly due to its poor cooperation and reactivity with human players, as well as the competence of characters controlled by AI varying widely depending on difficulty level. IGN's Patrick Kolan also expressed criticism toward a perceived lack of game boards, while GameSpy's Bryan Stratton spoke of a lack of both game boards and playable characters.

The presentation of Mario Party DS was also a frequent topic of discussion. Eurogamer's Ellie Gibson referred to the game's graphical style as big and bold, while Nick Tan of GameRevolution described the graphics and music as "appropriate and whimsically imagined". GameSpot's Frank Provo stated that the presentation "reflects the cheerful attitude you'd normally expect a game starring Mario to have". Provo also praised references to previous Mario games, such as one minigame featuring a music box that plays a rendition of the ground theme that plays in World 1-1 of Super Mario Bros. (1985).

The win condition usually involving only Stars elicited criticism from reviewers, with Eurogamer's Ellie Gibson referring to the system as "flawed and unfair". Bryan Vore of Game Informer expressed dismay due to luck remaining "a key gameplay mechanic" that could determine the outcome of a game, even during the last turn, while Michael Cole of Nintendo World Report noted that some minigames were "pure chance".

=== Sales ===
Mario Party DS became the most-sold game during the first week of its release in Japan, selling 230,000 copies. According to Famitsu, as of July 9, 2008, the game had sold 1.7 million copies in Japan. It was the 18th-best-selling game in Japan in 2008. By March 2011, the game had sold more than eight million copies worldwide. By September 2015, Mario Party DS had sold more than nine million units worldwide, making it the 11th-best-selling game for the Nintendo DS.

== Legacy ==
In October 2020, Mario Party DS became the subject of a viral fabricated anti-piracy screen uploaded by YouTuber Joey Perleoni, who subsequently uploaded multiple other videos showing various instances in which the message could supposedly be triggered, such as when an item shop is entered or the "Final 5 Frenzy" event is initiated. In actuality, Mario Party DS does not contain any special anti-piracy messages. The original video inspired several internet memes as well as an online trend of users creating and uploading their own fake anti-piracy messages.

== See also ==
- List of Nintendo DS games
- List of party video games
- List of video games featuring Mario
- 2007 in video games
