= Smash Court Tennis 3 =

2007 video game

- PSP PAL box cover art
- Developer: Namco Bandai Games
- Publishers: PlayStation Portable: JP/NA: Namco Bandai Games (Note: Released under the Namco brand.); EU: Sony Computer Entertainment; Xbox 360: JP: Namco Bandai Games (Note: Released under the Namco brand.); NA/EU: Atari
- Platforms: PlayStation Portable, Xbox 360
- Release: PlayStation Portable: AU: May 31, 2007; EU: June 1, 2007; JP: June 21, 2007; NA: July 16, 2007; Xbox 360: JP: December 13, 2007; NA: August 19, 2008; EU: August 29, 2008; AU: September 10, 2008
- Genre: Tennis
- Modes: Single player, multiplayer

Smash Court Tennis 3 (スマッシュコートテニス3, SumasshuKōto Tenisu 3) is a 2007 tennis video game developed by Namco Bandai Games for the PlayStation Portable and Xbox 360. The game features world class tennis players such as Roger Federer, Rafael Nadal and Justine Henin. The Xbox 360 version of the game featured updated graphics and new gameplay elements such as the ability to choose player emotions. The Xbox 360 version was delayed in all regions until between late August and early September 2008.

== Gameplay ==
The player roster consists of:

- Andy Roddick
- David Nalbandian
- Rafael Nadal
- Roger Federer
- Justine Henin
- Maria Sharapova
- Martina Hingis
- Serena Williams

== Reception ==
The game received "mixed or average reviews" on both platforms according to the review aggregation website Metacritic. In Japan, Famitsu gave it a score of all four eights for the PSP version, and one seven, one eight, and two sevens for the Xbox 360 version.

Reception

Aggregate score
Aggregator	Score	
Aggregator	PSP	Xbox 360
Metacritic	68/100	55/100

Review scores
Publication	Score	
Publication	PSP	Xbox 360
Destructoid	N/A	4/10
Electronic Gaming Monthly	4.83/10	N/A
Eurogamer	7/10	4/10
Famitsu	32/40	29/40
Game Informer	8.5/10	N/A
GamePro	3.25/5	2.5/5
GameRevolution	N/A	C
GameSpot	6.5/10	5.5/10
GameSpy	4/5	3/5
GameTrailers	N/A	6/10
GameZone	6.7/10	5/10
IGN	7/10	4.9/10
Official Xbox Magazine (US)	N/A	5/10
PlayStation: The Official Magazine	8/10	N/A
The New York Times	(average)	N/A

== See also ==
- Smash Court Tennis Pro Tournament
- Smash Court Tennis Pro Tournament 2
