= Hot Wheels: Beat That! =

2007 video game

- European cover art featuring Super Tsunami and Spine Buster
- Developer: Eutechnyx (Note: Human Soft developed the Nintendo DS version.)
- Publisher: Activision
- Series: Hot Wheels
- Platforms: Microsoft Windows; Nintendo DS; PlayStation 2 Wii; Xbox 360
- Release: 2007
- Genres: Racing, vehicular combat
- Modes: Single-player, multiplayer

Hot Wheels: Beat That! is a 2007 racing video game developed by Eutechnyx and published by Activision for PlayStation 2, Wii, Xbox 360, Windows and Nintendo DS. It is based on the Hot Wheels toy line manufactured by Mattel.

== Gameplay ==
The game features 3 events of racing in single player, 31 authentically modeled vehicles and 2 unplayable vehicles, two-player gameplay, competitive weaponry and power-ups. The player proceeds to race through a bedroom, mini golf, attic and a bowling alley. New events and cars can be unlocked by winning an event or achieving the 2 secondary goals for each event.

== Reception ==
Reception

Aggregate score
Aggregator	Score				
Aggregator	DS	PC	PS2	Wii	Xbox 360
Metacritic	65/100	35/100	50/100	55/100	43/100

Review scores
Publication	Score				
Publication	DS	PC	PS2	Wii	Xbox 360
IGN	6.5/10	3.5/10	3.3/10	3.3/10	3.5/10
Official Xbox Magazine (UK)	N/A	N/A	N/A	N/A	3/10
Official Xbox Magazine (US)	N/A	N/A	N/A	N/A	6.5/10
PALGN	N/A	N/A	N/A	N/A	4.5/10
TeamXbox	N/A	N/A	N/A	N/A	2.5/10

The DS, Wii and PlayStation 2 versions received mixed reviews, while the PC and Xbox 360 versions received "unfavorable" reviews, according to video game review aggregator Metacritic.
