= Naruto: Ultimate Ninja 2 =

2004 video game

- Developer: CyberConnect2
- Publishers: JP: Bandai; NA/PAL: Namco Bandai Games
- Director: Hiroshi Matsuyama
- Series: Naruto: Ultimate Ninja
- Platform: PlayStation 2
- Release: JP: September 30, 2004; NA: June 12, 2007; EU: October 19, 2007; AU: October 31, 2007
- Genre: Fighting game
- Modes: Single-player, multiplayer

Naruto: Ultimate Ninja 2, known in Japan as Naruto: Narutimate Hero 2 (NARUTO(ナルト) ナルティメットヒーロー2, Naruto: Narutimetto Hīrō 2), is the second installment of the fighting game series Naruto: Ultimate Ninja, and the second installment of the Hero series in Japan. It was developed by CyberConnect2 and published by Bandai. Like some other Naruto games in Japan, this one was available in two covers: one featuring Naruto Uzumaki along with several different characters in the background, and the other with Sasuke Uchiha and several other characters. The game was released on September 30, 2004, in Japan, June 12, 2007 in North America, and October 2007 in the PAL region.

== Gameplay ==
Ultimate Ninja 2 features a similar gameplay experience to Ultimate Ninja, featuring many of the same gameplay elements and geography. The game replaces the arcade-style story mode from the original game with an RPG-esque story mode that loosely covers the events up to episode 96 in the anime as well as a filler arc made up for the game involving a special seal made by Orochimaru. This is the last game to feature support characters until Ultimate Ninja 5 as they were excluded in Ultimate Ninja 3. This time, the support characters are no longer fixed and all characters in the game have the ability to become support characters.

There is a total of 32 characters featured in the game (33 in the Japanese version with the inclusion of Doto Kazahana as a promotion for the movie Naruto the Movie: Ninja Clash in the Land of Snow. The promotion also include two stages from the movie that were not included in the overseas version). All characters have the ability to activate special modes during battle (unlike the original game which restrict the modes to several characters).

== Release ==
Atari handled distribution of the title in Europe.

== Reception ==
Reception

Aggregate score
Aggregator	Score
Metacritic	73/100

Review scores
Publication	Score
1Up.com	B+
Eurogamer	6/10
Famitsu	34/40
GameDaily	7/10
GameRevolution	B
GameSpot	7.2/10
GameSpy	4/5 stars
GameZone	7.2/10
IGN	7.4/10
PlayStation: The Official Magazine	8/10
Anime News Network	B+

The game received "mixed or average reviews" according to the review aggregation website Metacritic. In Japan, however, Famitsu gave it a score of one nine, one eight, one nine, and one eight for a total of 34 out of 40. GamePro said of the game, "For series fans, this one is probably a no-brainer, but even if you've never watched the show before, you might want to give this one a spin. At the least, it'll keep you entertained while you wait for Smash Bros. Brawl to hit the Wii. And you never know: you might just find yourself tuning in to see what the television show is all about as well." (Note: GamePro gave the game 3.25/5 for graphics, 3/5 for sound, and two 3.5/5 scores for control and fun factor.)
