= Ultimate Duck Hunting =

2006 video game

- Developer: Mid Carolina Media
- Publishers: Mid Carolina Media (Windows); Detn8 Games (Wii)
- Platforms: Microsoft Windows, Wii
- Release: May 2, 2006 (PC); December 3, 2007 (Wii)
- Genre: Sports game
- Modes: Single-player, multiplayer

Ultimate Duck Hunting is a duck hunting video game developed by American studio Mid Carolina Media for Windows. The goal of the game is to shoot ducks and then collect them with hunting dogs, a concept similar to that of the classic NES game, Duck Hunt. A Nintendo Wii version was released by publisher Detn8 Games in December 2007; touted as the new-found company's first title, it was originally planned for release in July 2007, but it was delayed to December due to the E3 announcement of the Wii port.

== Critical reception ==
Ultimate Duck Hunting reception

Aggregate scores
Aggregator	Score	
Aggregator	PC	Wii
GameRankings	43.33%	22.25%
Metacritic	N/A	28/100

Review score
Publication	Score	
Publication	PC	Wii
GameTrailers	3.2	3.2
