= The Shield (video game) =

2007 video game

- Cover art
- Developers: Point of View, Inc.
- Publisher: Aspyr Media
- Platforms: Microsoft Windows, PlayStation 2
- Release: PlayStation 2: NA: January 9, 2007; EU: June 1, 2007; Windows: NA: January 22, 2007; EU: June 1, 2007
- Genres: Action, Stealth
- Mode: Single-player

The Shield (also known as The Shield: The Game) is a 2007 video game based on the television show of the same name. The Shield is a third-person shooter where players take on the role of Vic Mackey (portrayed by Michael Chiklis) fighting crime on the streets of Los Angeles. The game was originally announced in 2004 by Sammy Studios for Xbox and PlayStation 2 for 2005. During E3 2004 the game was handled as "one of the best TV licensed titles on the PS2".

== Reception ==
Reception

Aggregate scores
| Aggregator | Score |
|---|---|
| GameRankings | (PC) 38.40% (PS2) 38.10% |
| Metacritic | (PS2) 36/100 (PC) 34/100 |

Review scores
| Publication | Score |
|---|---|
| 1Up.com | D |
| Eurogamer | 3/10 |
| Game Informer | 4/10 |
| GameRevolution | C− |
| GameSpot | 3.9/10 |
| GameSpy | 1.5/5 |
| GameZone | 3/10 |
| IGN | (PS2) 2.2/10 (PC) 2.1/10 |
| PC Gamer (US) | 62% |
| X-Play | 2/5 |

The game was met with a negative reception upon release. GameRankings and Metacritic gave it a score of 38.10% and 36 out of 100 for the PlayStation 2 version, and 38.40% and 34 out of 100 for the PC version.
