= Ontamarama =

2007 video game

- Developer(s): Noise Factory
- Publisher(s): JP: Noise Factory; NA: Atlus
- Platform(s): Nintendo DS
- Release: JP: July 7, 2007; NA: November 6, 2007
- Genre(s): Music
- Mode(s): Single-player

Ontamarama (Note: Japanese: おんたま♪おんぷ島へん, Hepburn: Ontama Onputouhen) is a rhythm game published by Atlus for the Nintendo DS. It was released in Japan in July 2007, and in North America on November 6, 2007. The game uses both of the DS's screens, touch functionality, and the microphone during game play. The story revolves around colorful spirits called Ontama, who live on a tropical island and can create music. The player must quickly capture Ontama with the stylus while keeping up with the beat.

== Plot ==
Taking place on a tropical island, the focus of the story are the Ontama spirits. Someone steals the Ontama by hypnotizing the island's people. Beat and Rest, the main characters, are both "Ontamaestros" and they attempt to free the Ontama by battling the islanders in musical fights.

=== Storyline ===
Ontama are colorful musical spirits that exist in the world of Ontamarama, a peaceful world of beauty and natural rhythm. Ontama are extremely precious to the people there because their playful nature and soothing music bring happiness to everyone; Ontamaestros devote their lives to study the Ontama and learn how to orchestrate them to make music.

A young boy and girl, Beat and Rest live on a small tropical island in this world. As childhood friends as well as friendly rivals who aspire to become famous Ontamaestros, they compete to see who will be the one to achieve their dream first. One day, on their way back home from the OntaConservatory, where they study to become Ontamaestros, Beat and Rest find a weakened Otama in the middle of the road. This surprises them because Otama rarely appear in these places. It turns out that Blast, a demon seeking power, is capturing all of the Otamas. The player picks to play as either Beat or Rest, and must play against various enemy ontamaestros who use captured Otamas.

=== Characters ===
Beat: A high spirited boy who is studying to become an Ontamaestro. He is good at sports and has the ability to communicate with Ontamas.

Rest: A smart girl who thinks before she acts instead of relying on her instincts like Beat does. She is studying to become an Ontamaestro.

Coda: The teacher at the OntaConservatory. She has a friendly face but strict personality. She teaches the player how to conduct music with Ontama in tutorial mode.

Alto: A fairy who, while taking a nap with the Ontamas, was woken up by a terrible noise. She becomes hypnotized by a robot and is forced to capture Ontamas.

Aria: A maid in the village inn who follows a strange woman outside the window at night. It turns out the woman is playing a mysterious melody to capture Ontamas. When the woman discovers that Aria had followed her, she placed a Track Disk into Aria's necklace, causing her to fall unconscious.

Gig and Club: Club and his pet alligator, Gig, grew up together. Although Gig was too wild to be a house pet, Club found a way to calm Gig down using the music of Ontamas. The two of them are in search of an Ontama that will play music by itself without having to be conducted.

Elegy: An infernal robot created by Blast to collect the Ontamas. Elegy cannot speak but is able to fly.

Poco: A boy who lives in the jungle. While investigating the cause of strange phenomena in the jungle, Poco meets a boy who tells Poco that the strangeness is caused by the Ontama. The boy hands a track disk to Poco, tricking him into capturing Ontamas in order to save the jungle.

Dia and Tonic: A boy who was adopted by a wealthy family and led an extravagant, but boring, life. While strolling through the forest hoping to find some excitement, he finds Blast, who convinces Tonic to work with him.

Suite: A fangirl of Blast from the demonic realm. She decides to follow and help Blast when she accidentally sees him go into the human world.

Rubato: A butler who has served and raised many princes in the demonic realm. He follows Blast in order to keep an eye on him.

Blast: A prince of demons who yearns for greater power because he is insecure about his short stature and weaknesses. He escaped to the human world in order to gather Ontama to strengthen his powers.

== Gameplay ==
Ontamarama's gameplay is a combination of games like Dance Dance Revolution (DDR) and Elite Beat Agents. The player must hit a D-pad direction as it passes through a circle, similar to DDR, but with the stylus. Each arrow has a color and will only register if enough colored energy is stored. To store energy, the player must touch colored Ontama that move across the touch screen. Black Ontamas may appear and block the colored ones, and some Ontama need to be touched twice. Blowing into the microphone allows the player to clear the screen of all Ontama, but this can only be used a limited number of times.

The player should focus on clearing all the Ontamas on the screen. Ontama can be freed by tapping them with the stylus or drawing a circle around a group of Ontama of the same color. The player can also hold or swing Otama to clear them. Points are rewarded when Ontama are freed. However, Black Ontamas penalize the player for clearing them. Chains and bonus multipliers increase the score. For example, three Ontama cleared in a row gives the player a 3× multiplier. Once an Otama is freed, it fills its corresponding colored note, which corresponds to an arrow on the control pad that must be pressed at the time when it reaches the circle at the end. Hold notes require the player to press the button down at the start of the note and release it at the end of the note. Depending on the player's timing, a score (Good/Great/Master) is added to the overall performance score.

There is a performance gauge that indicates how well the player is doing. The player will have to replay the song if performance falls to zero.

In addition to gameplay, Ontama Points can be used to buy items from the shop.

=== Ontama ===
Different colored Otamas have different abilities.

White: Do not correspond to any notes, but give a boost to the performance gauge.

Black: Do not correspond to any notes and lower the performance gauge.

Red, Blue, Green, Yellow: Normal Ontama that correspond to notes.

=== Modes ===
Tutorial mode is for beginners to learn the basic gameplay. Story mode is the only mode available at the start; it goes through 12 stages. There are three levels of difficulty. Free mode is unlocked following the first time Story mode is beaten. It gives the player access to play any of the songs from Story mode, including bonus tracks. There are multiple modes to unlock, such as Challenge mode and Random mode.

== Song list ==
The song, "Let's Go Onmyoji!" is a recognizable song for fans of J-Pop. The other songs were created solely for the game.

No.	Title	Length
1.	"FUNKY BEAT" (composed by T. Tanaka)
2.	"PEACEFUL REST" (composed by T. Tanaka)
3.	"SPIRIT OF APRIL" (composed by M. Kaneda)
4.	"HAPPY BREEZE" (composed by N. Kamikura)
5.	"CLUB HOUSE GIG" (composed by T. Tanaka)
6.	"HYPNO-TRONIC DEATH" (composed by K. Abe)
7.	"POCO'S TPO" (composed by M. Kaneda)
8.	"DIATONIC!" (composed by T. Tanaka)
9.	"SWEET SUITE" (composed by T. Tanaka)
10.	"TRANCE MACABRE" (composed by N. Kamikura)
11.	"GUITAR FIEND" (composed by T. Tanaka)
12.	"THRASH METAL HELLION" (composed by T. Tanaka)
13.	"GET THE ONTAMA!" (composed by T. Tanaka)
14.	"LIKE HIM LIKE HER" (composed by T. Tanaka)
15.	"LET'S GO ONMYOJI! (INST.)" (composed by T. Tanaka)
16.	"FOLLOW THE MUSIC"
17.	"LET'S GO ONMYOJI!" (composed by T. Tanaka)

== Development ==
According to Atlus USA, Ontamarama was a worthy project for them to take on because "it stood out as a lively and fun game that is easy to learn, yet challenging to master."

The North American version of the game has almost all the same songs as the Japanese release. However, a few songs had to be dropped due to licensing issues.

== Reception ==
Reception

Aggregate score
Aggregator	Score
Metacritic	71/100

Review scores
Publication	Score
Destructoid	7/10
Famitsu	23/40
GameSpot	7/10
IGN	7.3/10
Nintendo Power	7/10
Nintendo World Report	7/10

Ontamarama received "average" reviews according to the review aggregation website Metacritic. IGN felt that the gameplay was too complicated, but that the game had plenty of charm. Aaron Kaluszka, a reviewer from Nintendo World Report, said, "Ontamarama is certainly no Elite Beat Agents, but its style of gameplay is definitely unique." In Japan, Famitsu gave it a score of one seven, one four, and two sixes, for a total of 23 out of 40.
