= Jenga World Tour =

2007 video game

- Developer: Atomic Planet Entertainment
- Publisher: Atari
- Platforms: Nintendo DS, Wii
- Release: November 13, 2007: Nintendo DS; NA: November 13, 2007; EU: November 30, 2007; AU: December 7, 2007 Wii; NA: December 7, 2007; AU: February 21, 2008; EU: February 22, 2008
- Genre: Puzzle

Jenga World Tour is a 2007 video game based on the popular Jenga game that was developed by Atomic Planet Entertainment and published by Atari, and released for the Nintendo DS and the Wii. It uses the standard gameplay of Jenga, but gives it slight tweaks in order to create different scenarios.

== Gameplay ==
Image from a lava level of Jenga World Tour.

Jenga World Tour uses the gameplay of the game Jenga, but different levels have different environmental factors that change how the game is played, such as a prehistoric Zambian jungle level where dinosaurs shake the tower as to make it fall. Some of the scenarios that were added include a Nepal "ice" level which makes blocks harder to grip, and a Chinese "vine" level which prevents some blocks from being moved. This aspect of the game has been criticized by reviewers since.

== Development ==
The game was first announced by Atari on July 6, 2007, and a prototype of the Wii version was later exhibited at E3 2007. After previewing the game themselves in July 2007, GameSpot reported, "... we're not convinced that the finished game will be nearly as much fun as 54 wooden bricks."

== Reception ==
Reception

Aggregate score
Aggregator	Score	
Aggregator	DS	Wii
Metacritic	32/100	26/100

Review scores
Publication	Score	
Publication	DS	Wii
4Players	N/A	60%
Eurogamer	2/10	N/A
Game Informer	N/A	2/10
GameDaily	N/A	2/10
GameRevolution	N/A	F
GameSpot	N/A	2/10
GameZone	6.1/10	3.5/10
IGN	4/10	1.7/10
NGamer	12%	N/A
Official Nintendo Magazine	N/A	39%
Maxim	N/A	2/5

Jenga World Tour received "generally unfavorable reviews" on both platforms according to the review aggregation website Metacritic. IGN said of the Wii version, "We can't believe we're even listing off reasons not to buy a game based on a $10 box of blocks." GameSpot said, "Putting Jenga underwater does not make it worth twice the cost of regular Jenga." GameSpot also gave the Wii version a dubious honor nomination for "Flat-Out Worst Game of 2007".
