= Wing Island =

2006 video game

- North American boxart for the Wii
- Developer: CAProduction
- Publisher: Hudson Soft
- Platform: Wii
- Release: JP: December 2, 2006; NA: March 20, 2007; AU: March 29, 2007; EU: April 13, 2007
- Genre: Flight simulator
- Modes: Single-player, multiplayer

Wing Island (ウィングアイランド, Wingu Airando) is a flight simulator video game for the Wii. The game was developed by CAProduction and published in Japan by Hudson Soft, Konami in North America, and in Europe and Australia by Nintendo.

== Gameplay ==
It is played using the gesture system in the Wii Remote. The player tilts the remote horizontally to turn, vertically to go up or down, and flick the Wii controller two times to the side to do a barrel-roll. The aircraft is indestructible and even hard crash-landings will only cause a temporary loss of control.

In addition to flying a single plane, players are also able to fly a squadron of planes, which are controlled simultaneously, in many formations.

Challenges include balloon popping, fire fighting, and cargo delivery.

The game also includes multiplayer minigame elements.

== Development ==
According to Hudson Soft, development on Wing Island was inspired by Nintendo's flight simulator Pilotwings, as the two share some distinct similarities.

== Reception ==
Reception

Aggregate score
Aggregator	Score
Metacritic	47/100

Review scores
Publication	Score
Electronic Gaming Monthly	3.67/10 (Note: In Electronic Gaming Monthly's review of the game, one critic gave it 3/10, and the rest gave it each a score of 4/10.)
Eurogamer	5/10
Famitsu	22/40
Game Informer	5/10
GameSpot	4.7/10
GameSpy	2/5
GameTrailers	5/10
GameZone	5.1/10
IGN	5/10
Nintendo Power	5.5/10
Nintendo World Report	7/10
VideoGamer.com	5/10
X-Play	2/5

The game received "generally unfavorable reviews" according to the review aggregation website Metacritic. In Japan, Famitsu gave it a score of one five, two sixes, and one five for a total of 22 out of 40.

The game sold only 800 units on December 2, 2006, the day of the Wii launch in Japan.
