= Street Trace NYC =

2007 video game

- Developer: Gaia Industries
- Publisher: Microsoft
- Platform: Xbox 360 (XBLA)
- Release: WW: August 22, 2007
- Genre: Combat Racing
- Modes: Single player, Multiplayer

Street Trace NYC is a cel-shaded combat hoverboard racing game set in the Boroughs of New York City outside Manhattan by independent software developer Gaia Industries for the Xbox 360's Xbox Live Arcade service. The game gets its name from the New York City setting and the Tron-like light trails the hoverboards generate. The game was released on August 22, 2007. The game is reported to have had one of the longest development cycles of any of the Xbox Live Arcade titles, with a supposed initial release date planned for the date of Xbox 360 launch on November 22, 2005. The game languished in development until it was finally released in August 2007.

== Gameplay ==
The game features both single player and multiplayer play.

The single player game involves a story arc that comprises five tournaments which include 63 matchups and three bosses, as well as 18 "trial" games that will be posted on the Xbox Live online leaderboard. The player is awarded four types of medals depending on the skill of their performance (Bronze, Silver, Gold, Platinum) in both the tournaments and trial games.

The game features two chief modes of racing: Racing and Arena:

- Racing games include:
  - Screamer: standard racing without weapons
  - Chaos: racing without a finish line - the race is "won" by collecting flags, shooting targets and taking down other racers
  - Streettrace: combat racing on extended tracks
- Arena games include:
  - Flag: a Capture the flag variant in which flags are carried to a target for points
  - Hunter: a version of Kill the Carrier
  - Chaos: similar to the Racing version, except within an arena
  - Takedown: a deathmatch game

The game allows two to four players on a single machine (split-screen), with up to four bots, and up to eight players online over Xbox Live.

== Reception ==
Reception

Aggregate score
| Aggregator | Score |
|---|---|
| Metacritic | 44/100 |

Review scores
| Publication | Score |
|---|---|
| Eurogamer | 4/10 |
| GameSpot | 5.5/10 |
| GamesTM | 2/10 |
| IGN | 5/10 |
| Official Xbox Magazine (UK) | 5/10 |
| Official Xbox Magazine (US) | 6/10 |
| TeamXbox | 5.1/10 |

The game received "generally unfavorable reviews" according to the review aggregation website Metacritic. The earliest review came from the UK version of Official Xbox Magazine, which gave it a score of 5 out of 10, though the game itself was not released until nearly seven months later.
