= Power Serve 3D Tennis =

1995 video game

- North American cover art
- Developer: SPS
- Publishers: NA: Ocean of America; EU: Ocean Software; JP: Kovax
- Platform: PlayStation
- Release: JP: 11 August 1995; NA: 31 August 1995; EU: February 1996
- Genre: Sports
- Modes: Single-player, multiplayer

Power Serve 3D Tennis (Note: Also known as Ground Stroke (Japanese: グランド ストローク, Hepburn: Guraundo Sutorōku) in Japan and Power Serve in Europe.) is a video game developed by SPS of Japan and published worldwide by Ocean Software for the PlayStation in 1995.

== Gameplay ==
Power Serve 3D Tennis is a tennis game which uses polygonal figures and numerous camera angles.

== Reception ==
Reception

Review score
Publication	Score
Dengeki PlayStation	40/100, 40/100, 55/100, 35/100

Next Generation reviewed the PlayStation version of the game and gave it three stars out of five. The magazine was critical to the game's camera angles, called the action in the game "sluggish" and felt that the controls are not intuitive.
