= Fatal Inertia =

2007 video game

- Developer(s): Koei Canada
- Publisher(s): Koei
- Engine: Unreal Engine 3
- Platform(s): Xbox 360, PlayStation 3
- Release: Xbox 360: JP: September 6, 2007; NA: September 11, 2007; EU: September 14, 2007; AU: September 20, 2007; PlayStation 3: JP: May 29, 2008; NA/AU: June 19, 2008; EU: July 15, 2008
- Genre(s): Racing
- Mode(s): Single-player, multiplayer

Fatal Inertia (Note: Japanese: フェイタル・イナーシャ, Hepburn: Feitaru Ināsha) is a futuristic hovercar racing game from Koei. Originally an exclusive for the PlayStation 3, it was released for the Xbox 360 in 2007 and then released on the PlayStation 3 on May 29, 2008 in Japan, June 19, 2008 in North America and Australia, and July 15, 2008 in Europe as a download on the PlayStation Network under the title Fatal Inertia EX. (Note: Japanese: フェイタル・イナーシャEX, Hepburn: Feitaru Ināsha EX) The PlayStation 3 version was initially delayed because of difficulties with the Unreal Engine 3 on the console, due to the cell processor's architecture.

The game is set in the mid-22nd century Earth, and a handful of immense corporations control virtually all business, politics, and entertainment. Extreme sports have become one of the main sources of entertainment with Fatal Inertia as the most popular. Competitions take place far from cities due to the high level of danger.

There are six different racing environments that are divided into fifty-one courses.

== Gameplay ==
Fatal Inertia has four main craft types, each one having advantages and disadvantages over each other:

- Phoenix Class: craft that, though they do not excel, are well balanced on most parameters.
- Aurora class: the fastest of all the classes, though with questionable reliability. Suited for adept or advanced players.
- Mercury class: light, fast accelerating vehicles with superior handling in contrast to other classes.
- Titan class: massive machines that can demolish the competition with their heavy armor and greater firepower, compensating for their poor handling and acceleration.

Though there are only 4 classes there are numerous upgrades that can tune each class to its own unique look, stats, and handling.

Fatal Inertia has a set of non-lethal weapons, mostly centered around magnetic behavior. Most of the weapons have primary fire which projects forwards, and a secondary fire that is projected backwards.

== Development ==
On August 2, 2007 a playable demo of Fatal Inertia was released on Xbox Live Marketplace.

On May 29, 2008 a multi-language playable demo of Fatal Inertia EX was released on the Japanese PlayStation Store.

On July 15, 2008, the same day as Europe's release, a trial version was also available on the PlayStation Store as a free download.

== Fatal Inertia EX ==
The PlayStation 3 version of the game is a download-only title, and appeared on the Japanese PlayStation Store on May 29, 2008, in North America and Australia on June 19, 2008, and in Europe on July 15, 2008, as part of PlayStation Network's E3 2008 release plan. A number of tweaks and improvements have been made to the title, notably the difficulty level; to this end, EX includes a training venue with eight new tracks, known as the "Fatal Inertia Proving Grounds Facility", as well as a Master difficulty level for veterans. The development team have also adjusted gameplay, including weapons and physics. Controls support the DualShock 3 along with SIXAXIS tilt control for craft steering.

== Reception ==
Reception

Aggregate score
Aggregator	Score	
Aggregator	PS3	Xbox 360
Metacritic	63/100	61/100

Review scores
Publication	Score	
Publication	PS3	Xbox 360
1Up.com	C−	N/A
Edge	N/A	6/10
Eurogamer	6/10	6/10
Famitsu	N/A	29/40
Game Informer	N/A	7.5/10
GameSpot	6.5/10	6/10
GameTrailers	N/A	5.8/10
GameZone	6.8/10	6.1/10
IGN	7.2/10	6/10
PlayStation Official Magazine – UK	3/10	N/A
Official Xbox Magazine (US)	N/A	7/10
411Mania	7/10	N/A

Both Fatal Inertia and Fatal Inertia EX received "mixed" reviews according to the review aggregation website Metacritic. In Japan, Famitsu X360 gave the former a score of two sevens, one eight, and one seven for a total of 29 out of 40. GameZone gave the Japanese version of the latter an average review, about a month before it was released in the United States. Cameron Lewis of GamePro said that Fatal Inertia "does not sink to bottom-of-the-barrel status, but neither does it ever manage to rise above merely average." (Note: GamePro gave the Xbox 360 version 3.75/5 for graphics, 2.25/5 for sound, 3.25/5 for control, and 2.75/5 for fun factor.) Later, however, Andrew Gori called the EX version "a fun game. The learning curve is gradual but the action starts from your first race and never lets up. Fans of racing games will like this title[,] especially ones who want a little something more." (Note: GamePro gave the PlayStation 3 version three 4.5/5 scores for graphics, control, and fun factor, and 4/5 for sound.)

== See also ==
- F-Zero
- Wipeout (series)
