= Earthquake in Zipland =

- Developer(s): Zipland Interactive
- Designer(s): Chaya Harash
- Platform(s): Windows
- Genre(s): therapeutic
- Mode(s): single player

Earthquake in Zipland is a computer game, which was developed by Moris Oz and released in 2004. It is a point and click adventure game. You click on dialogue options and work your way through different scenes. In the game a quest takes the player into a basement full of colorful characters and challenging tasks. The game tries to indirectly deal with a number of issues such as anger, guilt, loyalty conflicts, the fantasy to reunite the divorced parents and other emotional effects of divorce on children.

== Goal ==
The goal of the game is to help children whose parents are undergoing divorce to cope with it. Game designer and therapist Chaya Harash says that it is the “first research-based psychological computer game designed to help children deal indirectly with divorce and separation”. The game is designed to increase communication between the parents and children. The game comes with a Parent's Guide with tips and information on how to use the game with the child. You could use Earthquake in Zipland as a tool to help support children of divorce. The interactive story may include benefits of bibliotherapy brought to life on screen.

== Version ==
The game is available in two versions, one for parents and children and one for therapists and helping professionals. The game also works on Windows 98 and Windows XP
