= Extreme Tennis =

1998 video game

- Developer: Hammer Technologies
- Publisher: Head Games Publishing
- Platform: Microsoft Windows
- Release: NA: December 28, 1998
- Genre: Sports game
- Modes: Single player, multiplayer

Extreme Tennis is a video game developed by Hammer Technologies and published by Head Games Publishing for Windows in 1998. The game is an adapted and rebranded version of the game Tie Break Tennis '98.

== Reception ==
Reception

Aggregate score
Aggregator	Score
GameRankings	36%

Review scores
Publication	Score
Computer Gaming World	2/5
EP Daily	2.5/10
GameSpot	4.7/10
IGN	2.3/10
PC Accelerator	3/10
PC Gamer (US)	14%

The game received unfavorable reviews according to the review aggregation website GameRankings.
