= Smash Court Tennis Pro Tournament 2 =

2004 video game

- North American box art
- Developer: Now Production
- Publishers: EU: Sony Computer Entertainment; NA: Namco Hometek; JP: Namco
- Platform: PlayStation 2
- Release: PAL: May 28, 2004; NA: June 8, 2004; JP: July 1, 2004
- Genre: Sports
- Modes: Single-player, multiplayer

Smash Court Tennis Pro Tournament 2 (Note: Known in Japan and Korea as Smash Court Pro Tournament 2 (Japanese: スマッシュコート プロトーナメント2, Hepburn: SumasshuKōto PuroTōnamento Tsū)) is a 2004 tennis video game developed by Now Production and published by Namco for the PlayStation 2. It is the sequel to Smash Court Tennis Pro Tournament (2002).

== Gameplay ==
The game features many playable modes including Arcade mode and the in depth Pro tour mode in which you create a player and try to become a tennis champion. Other modes include Exhibition, Challenge and Tutorial. There are a range of courts one can play on, including those at the Australian Open (the old Rebound Ace courts), Roland Garros, Wimbledon and the U.S. Open. Along with various tennis characters, players can unlock characters from the Soulcalibur series (Cassandra Alexandra and Raphael Sorel) and Tekken series (Heihachi Mishima and Ling Xiaoyu).

== Reception ==
Reception

Aggregate score
Aggregator	Score
Metacritic	74/100

Review scores
Publication	Score
Edge	6/10
Electronic Gaming Monthly	7.67/10
Eurogamer	5/10
Famitsu	32/40
Game Informer	5/10
GamePro	3.5/5
GameRevolution	B
GameSpot	7.5/10
IGN	8/10
Official U.S. PlayStation Magazine	4/5
The Times	4/5

Smash Court Tennis Pro Tournament 2 received "average" reviews according to the review aggregation website Metacritic. Ryan Davis of GameSpot said, "PlayStation 2 owners should find plenty to like about Smash Court Tennis Pro Tournament 2." IGN's Ed Lewis said of the game, "Overall, it still isn't the best thing out there, but it's definitely a solid update and holds rather strongly by itself." One specific criticism of the game was that when entering the Davis/Fed-Cup styled 'World Tournament' as a player from a small nation, no realistic name generator was available for partners and other team members. In Japan, Famitsu gave it a score of all four eights for a total of 32 out of 40.

== See also ==
- Anna Kournikova's Smash Court Tennis
- Smash Court Tennis Pro Tournament
- Smash Court Tennis 3
