= Dragoneer's Aria =

2007 video game

- Developer: Hit Maker
- Publisher: Nippon Ichi Software
- Platform: PlayStation Portable
- Release: NA: August 21, 2007; JP: August 23, 2007; EU: February 15, 2008; AU: February 21, 2008
- Genre: Role-playing
- Mode: Single-player multiplayer

Dragoneer's Aria is an RPG for the PlayStation Portable, developed by Hit Maker and published by Nippon Ichi Software. It was released in North America on August 21, 2007, and was released as Dragoneer's Aria: Ryū ga Nemuru Made (ドラグナーズアリア 竜が眠るまで; lit. "Dragoneer's Aria: Until the Dragon Sleeps") in Japan on August 23, 2007.

== Gameplay ==
=== Battle system ===
A screenshot of a battle sequence showing the party's Mana and Energy at the top left of the screen, the most recent battle action below that, the party's statistics at the bottom left, and enemy information at the bottom right.

The game features a turn-based battle system, and enables the player to select the order in which the characters are to act. The actions that a character can make during battle are "Attack" (enables the character to physically attack an opponent), "Mana" (enables the character to perform skills and magic), "Guard" (allows the character to defend against an opponent's attack), "Item" (allows the character to use an item in the inventory), and "Escape" (allows the characters to run away from battle).

Magic is performed through attaching jewels called "lusces" to accessories such as rings and necklaces. The strength and effectiveness of lusces and other skills are improved through repetitive use; the more often skills and lusces are used, the more powerful they become.

Characters possessing elemental "dragon orbs" are also able to use "dragon skills", which are powerful elemental attacks. Certain dragon skills, when executed in succession, produce additional damaging elemental effects called "elemental combos". For example, executing the dragon skills "Water Swing" and "Thunder Slash" in succession produce the elemental combo "Landslide".

All playable characters also have their own "field skills", which can be executed in the field when a character is set as party leader. Field skills have various effects, such as Euphe's "Mana Sea" skill, which enables her to heal the party while on the field, and Valen's "Dash" skill, which enables him to move around the field at a swifter pace.

Executing skills and lusces require certain amounts of "mana", which is accumulated through successfully attacking opponents or guarding against opponent's attacks.

Monsters are found roaming the field in the form of flying eyeballs, which trigger battle sequences when the character comes into contact with them. These eyeballs chase after the on-screen character if he/she comes into the eyeballs' view.

=== Recipes and crafting ===
Items called "recipes" enable the player to combine ingredients in order to craft accessories, weapons, or more ingredients. Recipes can be acquired from certain NPCs and from shops.

=== Dragoneer Mode ===
The game also features "Dragoneer Mode", which enables 2-4 players to play in a cooperative fashion via the PSP's wireless LAN function. In this mode, players raid dragon's nests in order to gather loot and treasure. Players do not control a full party by themselves, rather they control one character each.

== Plot ==
The story centers on the adventures of Valen Kesslar, a young man who is about to graduate from Dragoon Academy. The graduation ceremony involves the appearance of the six elemental dragons, all of whom were originally part of the Holy Dragon Grinlek before he was destroyed by the Black Dragon, Nidhogg. The six elemental dragons keep the balance in the world of Iris. During the ceremony, Nidhogg appears and destroys the royal palace of Granadis, injuring the Water Dragon in the process. The Dragoons are then tasked to investigate Nidhogg and defend the other elemental dragons from him.

=== Playable characters ===
Valen Kesslar

A young Dragoon and the lead character of the story. He is idealistic and calm, and often takes things too seriously. He is known as Hart Klarvein (ハルト・クラルヴァイン, Haruto Kurarubein) in the Japanese version of the game.

Euphe Kalm (ユーフェ・カルム, Yūfe Karumu)

Euphe is a lively female Empath (a type of being that can heal others' wounds by absorbing the injuries into her own body) who encounters Valen right after Nidhogg's assault on Granadis. She falls in love with him at first sight. Euphe is voiced by Stephanie Sheh in English.

Mary Murphy

Mary is the young captain of a pirate ship called Mary, which was named after her. Her father died when she was eleven years old, leaving her in the care of the pirate crew. After her ship sinks, she seeks the Water Dragon as she believes that it will be able to save her ship. Her name in the Japanese version of the game is Ulrika Ekland (ウルリカ・エクランド, Ururika Ekurando). Mary is voiced by Kaori Mizuhashi in Japanese and Michelle Ruff in English, using typical pirate lingo.

Ruslan L'avelith

A guardian of the Earth Dragon who joins Valen in order to protect the holy spirits and Mother Nature from destruction. Ruslan is proud of his elven heritage, and looks down on humans and dragoons. In the Japanese version of the game, Ruslan's last name is Avelith (アベリツェフ, Aberiisu). Ruslan is voiced by Yuri Lowenthal in English.

=== Other characters ===
Langley Baldwin (ラングレイ・ボールドウィン, Rangurii Bārudowin)

A Dragoon and Valen's childhood friend. Langley is the first born of the Baldwin family, a revered family with a long line of Dragoons in its lineage.

Lucien Blaine

A Dragoon consumed by madness and who betrays his duties by killing two dragons and attempting to do the same to the others. Lucien is part of a family that considers financial and political influence to be more important that military influence. In the Japanese version of the game, Lucien's first name is Jared (ジャレッド, Jareddo).

Nikita Heil

A Dragoon who despises dragons and wishes to destroy their dragon orbs. Nikita is in love with a commoner, which is forbidden by the Dragoons' law. In the Japanese version of the game, Nikita's first name is Jennifer (ジェニファー, Jenifā).

Sonia Panova

The current leader of the Dragoons, Sonia was born into a family of Dragoons and is one of the first females to be initiated into the corps. Her leadership abilities are unparalleled and she shares deep bonds with her troops. In the Japanese version of the game, Sonia's last name is Olt (オルト). She is voiced by Mary Elizabeth McGlynn in the English version, with a Russian accent.

== Development ==
The game's 3D look and designs deviate from the usual 2D anime-style games Nippon Ichi Software is known for. The producer of the game for NIS, Sohei Niikawa, has described the game as a "noble sort of fantasy", which builds up on the basic elements of a fantasy game. Yukihiko Hojo, CEO of Hit Maker, has commented that creating Dragoneer's Aria served as a challenge for the company to create a new kind of RPG and include the various possibilities for a PSP game that they failed to include in their previous work, Blade Dancer.

=== Character Design ===
Juno Jeong, the art director for the popular Korean MMORPG Lineage II, did the character designs for Dragoneer's Aria. Niikawa stated that he believes that this would be a big selling point for the game. Jeong commented that he had always wanted to be involved in the production of a console game, and he had not worked as an illustrator for three years before working on this project. He also expressed some regret in not having been able to work with the design team personally because he felt that it is "the designer's responsibility to watch over the 3D character as it grows into its final form".

=== Music ===
Japanese singer Mimika sang the game's theme song entitled "Tobira o Hiraite" (扉を開いて, Opening the door). A piano version of Johann Sebastian Bach's "Air on the G String" is also used as the background music for the game's title screen, and was also used for the game's trailers and official Japanese website. According to Hojo, the reason for selecting "Air on the G String" was because they believed that it brought out the emotions involved in the characters' relationships.

== Reception ==
Reception

Aggregate score
| Aggregator | Score |
|---|---|
| Metacritic | 56/100 |

Review scores
| Publication | Score |
|---|---|
| Edge | 4/10 |
| Famitsu | 24/40 |
| Game Informer | 5.75/10 |
| GamePro | 2/5 |
| GameSpot | 4.5/10 |
| GameTrailers | 5.7/10 |
| GameZone | 7/10 |
| Hardcore Gamer | 4/5 |
| IGN | 5.5/10 |
| Pocket Gamer | 2.5/5 |
| PlayStation: The Official Magazine | 6.5/10 |
| RPGamer | 2.5/5 |
| RPGFan | 70% |

The game received "mixed" reviews according to the review aggregation website Metacritic. In Japan, Famitsu gave it a score of 24 out of 40.

Critics mostly complained about the "slow" gameplay and "clichéd" characters and plot. Jeff Haynes of IGN stated that the game "takes a lot of clichéd characters and tries to spice up the standard RPG fare with some adjustments to the skill and battle formula", while Andrew Fitch of 1Up.com described the game as "mediocre".

Dragoneer's Aria entered the Japanese weekly sales charts at number six for selling 23,617 units from its release date to the week of August 20 to August 26, 2007.
