= Rafa Nadal Tennis =

2007 video game

- Cover art for the game; featuring Rafael Nadal
- Developer: Virtual Toys
- Publisher: Codemasters
- Platform: Nintendo DS
- Release: EU: December 27, 2006; NA: June 30, 2007
- Genre: Sports
- Modes: Single-player, Multiplayer

Rafa Nadal Tennis is a sports video game developed by Virtual Toys and published by Codemasters. It was released for the Nintendo DS on December 27, 2006. The game features tennis athlete Rafael Nadal on the cover and primarily focuses on the sport of tennis.

== Gameplay ==
Players can play as Rafael Nadal or a custom avatar, competing in tournaments on different court surfaces. The DS touchscreen allows serving, volleying, and executing shots with precision, while the game's responsive controls aim to reflect the pace and timing of real tennis matches.

The main menu featuring game modes and two pictures of Rafael Nadal

In game; Rafael Nadal facing Mathew Gordon

In addition to single-player modes such as career mode and exhibition matches, Rafa Nadal Tennis features multiplayer functionality, allowing players to compete against friends or other players locally or online. With its online matchmaking system, players can test their skills against opponents from around the world, adding a competitive edge to the gameplay experience and extending the game's replay value.

== Reception ==
Reception

Aggregate score
Aggregator	Score
Metacritic	56/100

Review scores
Publication	Score
Eurogamer	6/10
GamesMaster	63/100
GameSpot	4.3/10
GamesTM	5/10
IGN	6.6/10
NGamer	65/100
Official Nintendo Magazine	66/100

Rafa Nadal Tennis received "mixed or average" according to review aggregator Metacritic.

Alex Simmons at IGN UK rated the game 7.7/10, stating that "Rafa Nadal Tennis is a decent game. Visually it's nothing special – while the player animations are good, the detail is painfully lacking in the close-ups, although it's not really that apparent in the middle of a rally."

Whereas Craig Harris at IGN rated the game 5.5/10, stating that "Rafa Nadal Tennis is a “second generation” Nintendo DS game made during those experimental days of trying to find uses for the handheld's touch screen."

Aaron Thomas at GameSpot rated the game 4.3/10, stating that "Rafa Nadal Tennis is better than the Nintendo DS's other tennis game, the unplayable Top Spin 2, but that's not saying a whole lot."

GamesTM stated in their magazine that "Played with the face buttons though, Rafa Nadal Tennis becomes a competent Virtua Tennis clone with a decent selection of shots, and great animation, but a clone that reveals its weaknesses over time."
