= Smash Court Tennis Pro Tournament =

2002 video game

- PAL box art
- Developer: Namco
- Publishers: WW: Namco; EU: Sony Computer Entertainment
- Platforms: Arcade, PlayStation 2
- Release: JP: February 7, 2002; NA: March 20, 2002; PAL: June 21, 2002
- Genre: Sports
- Modes: Single-player, multiplayer
- Arcade system: Namco System 246

Smash Court Tennis Pro Tournament, known in Japan as Smash Court Pro Tournament (スマッシュコート プロトーナメント, SumasshuKōto PuroTōnamento), is a 2002 sports video game developed and published by Namco for the PlayStation 2. The game features real-life professional tennis players, as well as the fictional Namco sports "image girl", Hitomi Yoshino (吉乃ひとみ). It is the sequel to the Japan-exclusive 2000 PlayStation game Smash Court 3. The game was succeeded by Smash Court Tennis Pro Tournament 2 in 2004.

== Reception ==
Reception

Aggregate score
Aggregator	Score
Metacritic	73/100

Review scores
Publication	Score
AllGame	3.5/5
Famitsu	30/40
Game Informer	7.75/10
GamePro	3.5/5
GamesMaster	83%
GameSpot	7.2/10
IGN	8/10
Jeuxvideo.com	17/20
Official U.S. PlayStation Magazine	3.5/5
PlayStation: The Official Magazine	6/10

The game received "average" reviews according to the review aggregation website Metacritic. In Japan, Famitsu gave it a score of 30 out of 40.
