= ATP Tour Championship Tennis =

1995 video game

- North American box art
- Developer: SIMS Co., Ltd.
- Publisher: Sega (Note: Released under the Sega Sports banner.)
- Platform: Sega Genesis
- Release: PAL: February 10, 1995; NA: March 1995
- Genre: Sports (tennis)
- Modes: Single-player, multiplayer

ATP Tour Championship Tennis is a 1995 tennis video game developed by SIMS Co., Ltd. and published by Sega for the Sega Genesis.

== Gameplay ==
ATP Tour is the main mode of the game, starts with the user creating a player and customizing attributes such as birth date, nationality, height, weight, and gameplay-related such as making the player right or left-handed, and choosing two moves for backhand and forehand each. Once the game starts, the user is placed at the bottom of the rankings. ATP Senior Tour consists of a single-elimination tournament with eight retired ATP players participating. A total of 40 licensed ATP tennis players are featured in the game, with 32 active (at the time) and 8 retired legends.

In Exhibition mode, the player can select from a variety of combinations, ranging from a singles game against the computer, another person or just watch, up to a doubles game with four players at the same time. In Exhibition Tournament, the player can create a singles tournament, customizing parameters such as the length of matches, and choose between four kinds of surfaces (clay, hard, carpet and grass).

== Reception ==
GamePro stated in their review that "ATP scores a decisive win over EA's recent IMG International Tennis Tour." They particularly praised the game's numerous options, solid controls, and adjustable difficulty, though they did criticize that the scaling of the ball "sometimes distracts you more than it helps you." A reviewer for Next Generation applauded the game's originality, commenting that "The usual Pong feel of previous tennis games is still all here, but the ability to lob a pass, drill a passing shot, cut the ball, and nail 100 mph serves on the chalk, makes this absolutely the best Genesis tennis product to date." Additionally complimenting the highly challenging AI and accessible gameplay, he gave it four out of five stars.
