= Grand Slam Tennis =

2009 video game

- Developer: EA Canada
- Publisher: EA Sports
- Platform: Wii
- Release: NA: June 8, 2009; AU: June 9, 2009; UK: June 12, 2009
- Genre: Sports
- Modes: Single Player, Multiplayer

Grand Slam Tennis, known as Grand Chelem Tennis in France, is a 2009 tennis simulation video game, developed by EA Canada and released for the Wii. Some features include online play, Wii MotionPlus functionality, pick up and play, a Grand Slam career mode, and all four Grand Slam locations, including Wimbledon. The game was also the first title in Europe to be bundled with the Wii MotionPlus. The in-game music was created by Paul van Dyk, who wrote and produced all the tracks in the game.

== Gameplay ==
Grand Slam Tennis features 23 total players, including 10 tennis legends and 13 of the top players at the ATP and WTA rankings as of the time of the game's release. It also includes a "Create-A-Player" mode. In the "Create-A-Player" mode, players can create their own unique player for use in all modes of the game. The player can customize their created player with branded clothing, racquet styles, accessories and physical appearance. Up to nine players can be created at any one time. Pat Cash serves as the commentator even when he is playing in a match. Grand Slam Tennis offers 12 different authentic stadiums from all four Grand Slam venues to play in, and is the first video game since Top Spin 2 to feature a licensed Wimbledon.

Play Now is a mode allows players to enter either a singles or doubles match. This mode is available for both single and multiplayer forms of play. The player is able to select their venue, and to choose settings such as set length, number of sets, difficulty and the option of a tie-break.

Grand Slam mode allows players to embark on a career with their created player. The career involves travelling to each of the four Grand Slam tournaments and attempt to achieve the Grand Slam by winning every tournament. Each tournament begins with a warm-up match against a fellow fictional rookie of average ability. The player can then challenge a legend or current player to a match in an attempt to learn the players special ability, e.g. Rafael Nadal's forehand topspin, or Björn Borg's fitness. If the player is successful with their challenge, they may equip that special ability for use in future matches. The player can equip only one ability to start with, however as the player increases in skill, they will be able to equip multiple abilities at one time. Then the player will take part in a party style mini-game form of tennis along with fictional players, before starting the tournament. Every tournament starts at the round of 32 stage (round 3).

Party Mode is a collection of mini-games that are each a slightly altered form of tennis, with slight rule changes:

- Tag Team: 2 on 2 with players rotating and taking turns hitting the ball.
- Aussie Doubles: 2 on 1 and the players rotate after each set.
- Drop and Lob: use the drop shot and lob winners for double points.
- Champs: time based game, take turns swinging, win the rally to become a champ.
- King of the Court: beat the king to become king, only the king earns points.
- Net-masters: Net shots are worth double points.
- Triplets: Similar to Aussie doubles where (2 on 1) but the players do not rotate around.

Online multiplayer consists of ranked or unranked matches where you can play anyone around the world. Ranked earns the player points when they beat someone and these points decide what overall ranking you are in the world. Unranked matches are friendly and do not earn any points for the player's online profile. It is good for people who are preparing to hit the leaderboards. When players win ranked matches they do not only win points for themselves but also for their country. There is a national leaderboard which shows which country has the best players.

== Reception ==
Reception

Aggregate score
Aggregator	Score
Metacritic	78/100

Review scores
Publication	Score
1Up.com	B−
Eurogamer	8/10
Famitsu	27/40
Game Informer	7/10
GamePro	4.5/5
GameSpot	6/10
GameTrailers	8.5/10
GameZone	8.2/10
IGN	8.5/10
Nintendo Power	7.5/10
The Daily Telegraph	8/10
Teletext GameCentral	8/10

Grand Slam Tennis received "generally favorable reviews" according to the review aggregation website Metacritic. In Japan, where the game was ported for release on July 2, 2009, Famitsu gave it a score of one eight, two sixes, and one seven for a total of 27 out of 40.

411Mania gave it a score of eight out of ten and said, "If you are a big fan of the sport, and even engage in the sport in your free time, you will no-doubt enjoy this game. Grand Slam is a fun way to prepare you for the game's real online draw. If you've just been settling for Wii Tennis over the past few years, then now is the time to act, because Grand Slam Tennis is likely as good as it is ever going to get for the sport on the Wii." The Daily Telegraph similarly gave it eight out of ten, saying, "Though ultimately lacking the precision a truly great tennis game needs, EA should be commended for a superb Wii effort which amply demonstrates the publisher's commitment to the format. If not quite the revolution it promised to be, Grand Slam Tennis shows enough promise that next year's iteration should be a classic." Teletext GameCentral also gave it eight out of ten, saying, "EA's tennis and Wii MotionPlus debut is a success after all and an encouraging sign for the future."

== See also ==
- Virtua Tennis 2009, a contemporary multiplatform tennis video game released by Sega whose Wii version also supports Wii MotionPlus
