= Mafia (disambiguation) =

A mafia is an ethnic, family or culture-based organized crime enterprise.

Mafia usually refers specifically to:

- Sicilian Mafia, the original "Mafia", often referred to simply as "the Mafia"
- American Mafia, an Italian-American offshoot of the original Sicilian Mafia often referred to simply as "The Mafia" in the United States
- Ethnic Italian organized crime in general and organized crime in Italy

== Entertainment ==
=== Film and television ===
- Mafia (1993 film), Indian Malayalam-language film directed by Shaji Kailas
- Mafia (1996 film), Indian Hindi-language film directed by Aziz Sejawal
- Mafia!, also known as Jane Austen's Mafia!, a 1998 American comedy film
- Mafia (2002 film), Egyptian film
- Mafia (2020 film), Indian Tamil-language film directed by Karthick Naren
- Mafia (TV series), an Indian web series
- "Mafia" (The Office), the sixth episode of the sixth season of The Office
- Radiomafia, a defunct Finnish radio station

=== Games ===
- Mafia (party game), also known as Werewolf
- Mafia (series), a series of video games by 2K Games
  - Mafia (video game), 2002 video game
  - Mafia II, 2010 video game
  - Mafia III, 2016 video game
  - Mafia: Definitive Edition, 2020 video game
  - Mafia: The Old Country, 2025 video game
- Mafia Wars, a social network game

=== Music ===
- La Mafia, a Tejano band
- Swedish House Mafia, a Swedish electronic dance music trio
- Lisa Maffia, British rapper
- B.U.G. Mafia, or simply Mafia, a Romanian rap group
  - Mafia (B.U.G. Mafia album), 1995
- Mafia (Black Label Society album), 2005
- Mafia (Fleshgod Apocalypse EP), 2010
- "Mafia" (Jala Brat and Buba Corelli song), 2018
- "Mafia" (Travis Scott song), 2021

== Groups and organizations ==
- Bomber Mafia, a group of American military men who believed that long-range heavy bomber aircraft in large numbers were able to win a war
- Fighter Mafia, a group of U.S. Air Force officers and civilian defense analysts who advocated for fighter design criteria in opposition to those of the design boards of the time
- Maffia, Czechoslovak secret organization acting during World War I
- Berkeley Mafia, a group of Indonesian economists
- Lesbian Sex Mafia, a New York City group for the support of alternative culture women
- Mid America Fists In Action, a nonprofit organization for men interested in fisting
- Memphis Mafia, a group of associates of Elvis Presley from 1954 until he died
- Scottish mafia, a pejorative term for a group of Scottish politicians supposedly in control of the British government in the recent Labour administrations
- The Main Event Mafia (M.E.M.), a professional wrestling stable
- Gay Mafia, or Velvet Mafia, a pejorative term for the amalgamation of gay rights groups in politics and the media
- Kiambu Mafia, people from Kenya's Kiambu District

== Other uses ==
- Mafia Island, part of Tanzania's Zanzibar Archipelago
