= Top Spin (video game series) =

- Publisher: 2K
- First release: Top Spin; 2003
- Latest release: TopSpin 2K25; 2024

Top Spin is a series of tennis simulation video games that include virtual representations of real life professional tennis players and real life tennis courts.

The first entry, Top Spin, was released in 2003 for the Xbox and in later years was also released on Microsoft Windows and the PlayStation 2 platforms.

== Hiatus ==
After Top Spin 4 was released in 2011, no other entry was announced for the series and it entered a hiatus, until thirteen years later, in 2024, when 2K released TopSpin 2K25, the fifth game of the series.

== Released entries ==
- Top Spin (2003)
- Top Spin 2 (2006)
- Top Spin 3 (2008)
- Top Spin 4 (2011)
- TopSpin 2K25 (2024)

== Featured players ==
=== Men’s ===
Player	Nationality	Top Spin	Top Spin 2	Top Spin 3	Top Spin 4	Top Spin 2K25
Andre Agassi	(United States) USA				✓	✓
Carlos Alcaraz	Spain					✓
Mario Ancic	Croatia			✓		
Boris Becker	Germany	✓			✓	
Matteo Berrettini	Italy					✓
James Blake	(United States) USA	✓	✓	✓	✓	
Bjorn Borg	Sweden				✓	
Michael Chang	(United States) USA				✓	
Guillermo Coria	Argentina		✓			
Jim Courier	(United States) USA				✓	
Nikolay Davydenko	Russia				✓	
Novak Djokovic	Serbia				✓	
Roger Federer	Switzerland	✓	✓	✓	✓	✓
Taylor Fritz	(United States) USA					✓
Tommy Haas	Germany		✓	✓		
Tim Henman	(United Kingdom) Great Britain		✓			
Lleyton Hewitt	Australia	✓	✓			
Gustavo Kuerten	Brazil	✓				
Ivan Lendl	(United States) USA				✓	
John McEnroe	(United States) USA					✓
Daniil Medvedev	Russia					✓
Max Mirnyi	Belarus		✓			
Gael Monfils	France			✓		
Carlos Moyá	Spain	✓	✓			
Andy Murray	(United Kingdom) Great Britain			✓	✓	✓
Rafael Nadal	Spain			✓	✓	
David Nalbandian	Argentina			✓		
Mark Philippoussis	Australia			✓		
Patrick Rafter	Australia				✓	
Marcelo Rios	Chile	✓				
Tommy Robredo	Spain	✓				
Andy Roddick	(United States) USA		✓	✓	✓	
Pete Sampras	(United States) USA				✓	✓
Ben Shelton	(United States) USA					✓
Gilles Simon	France				✓	
Jannik Sinner	Italy					✓
Frances Tiafoe	(United States) USA					✓
Bernard Tomic	Australia				✓	
Stan Wawrinka	Switzerland				✓	
Alexander Zverev	Germany					✓

=== Women’s ===
Player	Nationality	Top Spin	Top Spin 2	Top Spin 3	Top Spin 4	Top Spin 2K25
Martina Hingis	Switzerland	✓				
Maria Sharapova	Russia	✓	✓	✓		✓
Venus Williams	(United States) USA	✓	✓			
Serena Williams	(United States) USA				✓	✓
Justine Henin	Belgium			✓		
Caroline Wozniacki	Denmark			✓	✓	✓
Ana Ivanovic	Serbia				✓	
Jelena Jankovic	Serbia				✓	
Iga Świątek	Poland					✓
Naomi Osaka	Japan					✓
Coco Gauff	(United States) USA					✓
Steffi Graf	Germany					✓
Lindsay Davenport	(United States) USA		✓			
Elena Dementieva	Russia	✓	✓			
Svetlana Kuznetsova	Russia		✓	✓		
Amélie Mauresmo	France		✓	✓		
Alicia Molik	Australia		✓			
Anastasia Myskina	Russia		✓			
Ai Sugiyama	Japan		✓			
Eugenie Bouchard	Canada				✓	
Dinara Safina	Russia				✓	
Vera Zvonareva	Russia				✓	
Belinda Bencic	Switzerland					✓
Paula Badosa	Spain					✓
Karolína Plíšková	Czech Republic					✓
Emma Raducanu	(United Kingdom) Great Britain					✓
Leylah Fernandez	Canada					✓
Madison Keys	(United States) USA					✓
Sloane Stephens	(United States) USA					✓
Caroline Garcia	France					✓
