= Haden Blackman =

American writer and video game designer

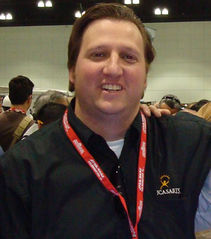
- Born: William Haden Blackman; United States
- Occupations: Video game designer, writer
- Years active: 1999–present

William Haden Blackman is an American video game designer and writer.

== Early life ==
Blackman grew up in Seal Beach, California. As a child, he read comic books during long road trips, which created his love for fantastical creatures.

== Early life and education ==
Blackman attended the University of California, Santa Cruz, where he earned his degree in Creative Writing.

== Career ==
Shortly after graduating, he worked as a ghost writer and submissions editor for a small Northern California literary agency while pursuing his writing career. His first published work was The Field Guide to North American Monsters: Everything You Need to Know About Encountering Over 100 Terrifying Creatures in the Wild, which was followed by a sequel entitled The Field Guide to North American Hauntings: Everything You Need to Know About Encountering Over 100 Ghosts, Phantoms, and Spectral Entities. Soon after completing the first Field Guide, Blackman began work at LucasArts as a writer and later a voice director, producer, and ultimately creative director. Blackman served as a producer on the massively multiplayer online role-playing game Star Wars: Galaxies He was the project lead on Star Wars: The Force Unleashed, a role which he described as "a hybrid between creative director and executive producer."

While working at LucasArts, Blackman continued his freelance writing career. He penned several Star Wars comics, including Jango Fett: Open Seasons, Star Wars: Starfighter, and Darth Vader & The Ghost Prison, among many other titles.

On July 29, 2010, he resigned from his position at LucasArts after thirteen years to form his own development studio, Fearless Studios. His last project at LucasArts was Star Wars: The Force Unleashed II, which he wrote and directed. He also wrote the game's comic book adaptation.

After leaving LucasArts, Blackman wrote Batwoman for DC Comics but left the series when the publisher would not allow the creative team to marry the protagonist Kate Kane to her longtime girlfriend, Maggie Sawyer. His run on the series lasted for 24 issues and four story arcs, and reached #1 on the New York Times Best Seller list.

On December 30, 2013, it was announced that he would write Elektra, which marked his debut writing for Marvel Comics.

It was announced on February 26, 2015, that he would write Master of Kung Fu for Marvel.

In 2018, Blackman and J.H. Williams III revealed their next project together, a genre mash-up called Echolands to be published by Image Comics.

Fearless Studios, Blackman's game development studio, was acquired by Kabam in 2012. On December 4, 2014, it was announced that Blackman had created another new video game studio called Hangar 13 Games within 2K Games. He was quoted as saying "I wanted to build the kind of games that I enjoy playing... From my perspective, 2K always puts the game first." The studio was confirmed to be working on an unspecified game. The game was later confirmed as Mafia III, the sequel to Mafia II, which he directed with his new studio Hangar 13, in conjunction with 2K Czech, the previous developer of the Mafia series.

== Awards ==
In 2009, Blackman won awards for outstanding video game writing from both the Writers Guild of America and the Academy of Interactive Arts & Sciences for his work on Star Wars: The Force Unleashed. He was nominated for another WGA award in 2011 for The Force Unleashed II. In 2012, Blackman won the GLAAD Media Award for Outstanding Comic Book for Batwoman, and was nominated for the same award in 2014.

== Bibliography ==
=== Star Wars comics ===
- Star Wars Tales
- Star Wars: Starfighter
- Star Wars: Jango Fett - Open Seasons
- Star Wars: The Clone Wars
- Star Wars: The Clone Wars Adventures
- Star Wars: The Force Unleashed comic adaptation
- Star Wars: Republic
- Star Wars: Obsession
- Star Wars: X-Wing: Rogue Leader
- Star Wars: Darth Vader and the Lost Command
- Star Wars: Darth Vader and the Ghost Prison

=== Star Wars reference books ===
- The New Essential Guide to Vehicles and Vessels
- The New Essential Guide to Weapons and Technology

=== DC Comics ===
- Batwoman

=== Marvel ===
- Elektra
- Master of Kung Fu

=== Non-fiction ===
- The Field Guide to North American Monsters: Everything You Need to Know About Encountering Over 100 Terrifying Creatures in the Wild
- The Field Guide to North American Hauntings: Everything You Need to Know About Encountering Over 100 Ghosts, Phantoms, and Spectral Entities

== Games ==
- Star Wars: Starfighter (2001) - writer
- Star Wars: Jedi Starfighter (2002) - lead writer
- Star Wars Galaxies: Empire Divided (2003) - writer
- Star Wars: The Force Unleashed (2008) - director, lead writer
- Star Wars: The Force Unleashed II (2010) - lead writer
- Mafia III (2016) - director, writer
- Mafia: Definitive Edition (2020) - director, writer
