= Fusion engine =

Fusion engine may refer to:

- Fusion engine, an engine that runs on fusion power, generally referring to a fusion rocket.
- Fusion Engine, the game engine used in Descent 3
- Fusion Engine, the game engine used in Mafia III and Mafia: Definitive Edition
