= Alex Kuznetsov =

American tennis player

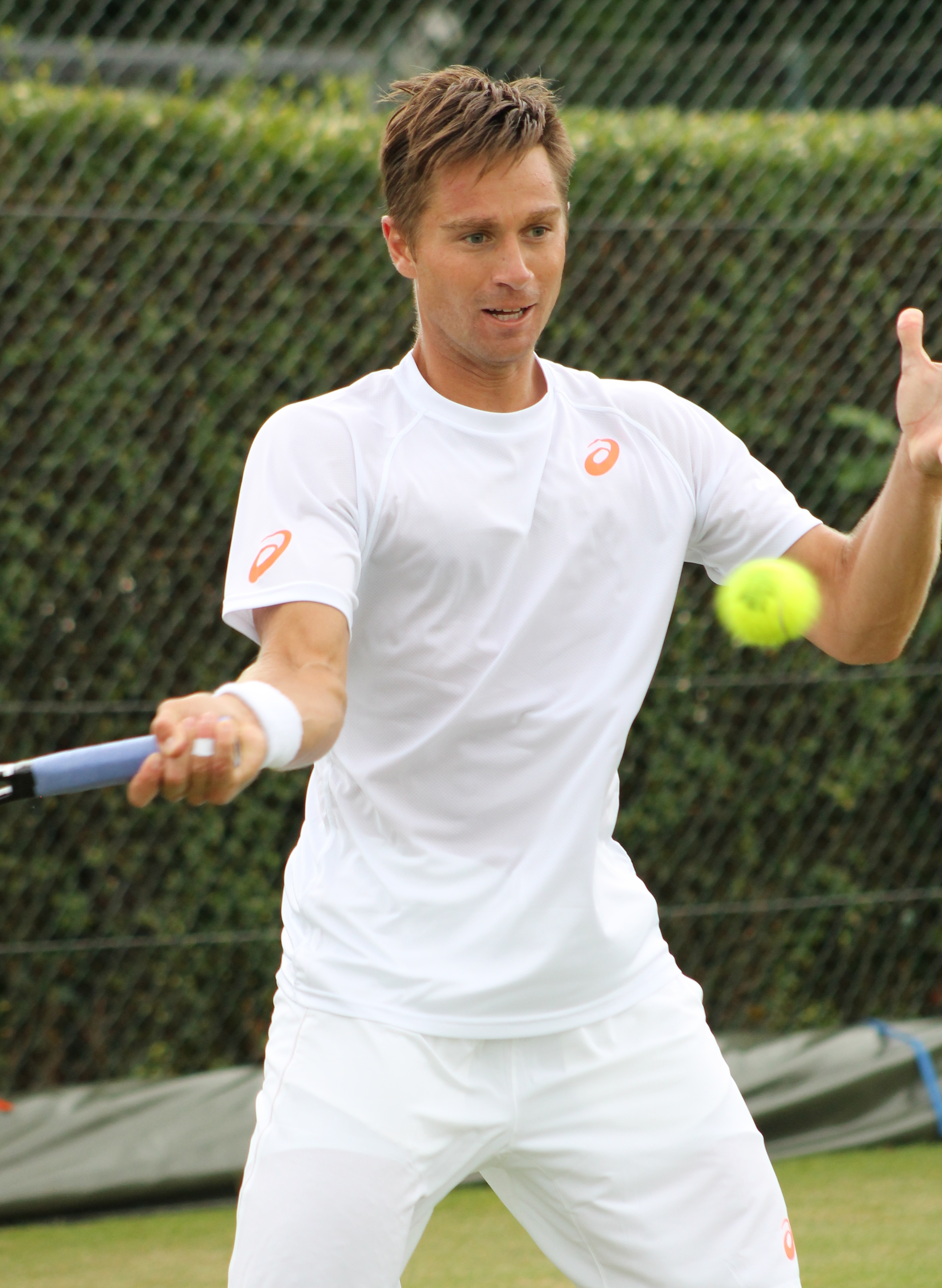
- Native name: Алекс Кузнєцов
- Country (sports): United States
- Born: February 5, 1987 (age 39) Kiev, Ukrainian SSR, Soviet Union (now Kyiv, Ukraine)
- Height: 1.83 m (6 ft 0 in)
- Turned pro: 2004
- Retired: 2016
- Plays: Right-handed (two-handed backhand)
- Prize money: US $924,466

Singles
- Career record: 9–30
- Career titles: 0
- Highest ranking: No. 120 (September 30, 2013)

Grand Slam singles results
- Australian Open: 2R (2007)
- French Open: 1R (2013)
- Wimbledon: 1R (2013, 2014)
- US Open: 1R (2006, 2007)

Doubles
- Career record: 9–14
- Career titles: 0
- Highest ranking: No. 78 (September 24, 2007)

Alex Kuznetsov (Note: Ukrainian: Алекс Кузнєцов, romanized: Aleks Kuznietsov) (born February 5, 1987) is a retired professional tennis player. He is a former hitting partner of Maria Sharapova.

== Personal life ==
Kuznetsov was born in Kiev, Ukrainian SSR, Soviet Union (now Kyiv, Ukraine). His family moved to the United States when he was three years old, settling just outside Philadelphia.

== Tennis career ==
=== Juniors ===
Kuznetsov was coached by Jason Katzer during his youth. As a junior, Kuznetsov compiled a singles win–loss record of 67–27 (50-21 in doubles), reaching a combined junior world ranking of number 4 in July 2004.

Junior Slam results – Singles:

Australian Open: -
French Open: F (2004)
Wimbledon: 2R (2004)
US Open: 3R (2005)

Nike offered Kuznetsov a one-million dollar sponsorship contract as soon as he turned pro, which he accepted.

=== 2006 ===
In July 2006, Kuznetsov played in the Comerica Challenger in Aptos, defeating Go Soeda for the 2006 singles title. At the 2006 US Open, he lost to fourteenth seed Tommy Haas.

That same year, Kuznetsov appeared in the video game Top Spin 2 as an up-and-coming star.

=== 2007 ===
Kuznetsov reached the second round of the 2007 Australian Open, defeating Australian Peter Luczak before losing to fellow American James Blake, 6–4, 6–1, 6–2. Kuznetsov gave Blake an early scare by breaking Blake's first two service games.

In April 2007, he reached his career-high singles ranking of World number 158.

In the 2007 US Open he played doubles with American Jesse Levine. They won their first round match over Dominik Hrbatý of Slovakia and Harel Levy of Israel, 6–1, 6–4, and their second round match, upsetting seventh-seeded Frenchmen Arnaud Clément and Michaël Llodra 7–6(5), 6–4, before losing in the third round to ninth-seeded Czechs Lukáš Dlouhý and Pavel Vízner, 6–4, 7–5.

In December, Kuznetsov, Levine, and Wayne Odesnik were invited by the USTA to play off in a round-robin for the wild-card berth in the Australian Open. Levine won the wild card.

== Performance timelines ==
Key
W	F	SF	QF	#R	RR	Q#	DNQ	A	NH

(W) winner; (F) finalist; (SF) semifinalist; (QF) quarterfinalist; (#R) rounds 4, 3, 2, 1; (RR) round-robin stage; (Q#) qualification round; (DNQ) did not qualify; (A) absent; (NH) not held; (SR) strike rate (events won / competed); (W–L) win–loss record.

=== Singles ===
Current through 2015 Australian Open.

Tournament	2006	2007	2008	2009	2010	2011	2012	2013	2014	2015	W–L
Grand Slam tournaments
Australian Open	A	2R	Q2	A	Q1	Q3	1R	Q1	Q3	Q3	1–2
French Open	A	Q2	Q1	A	A	Q1	Q2	1R	Q1	A	0–1
Wimbledon	A	Q2	Q1	A	Q2	Q2	Q1	1R	1R		0–2
US Open	1R	1R	Q3	Q1	Q1	Q1	Q1	Q3	Q1		2–3
Win–loss	0–1	1–2	0–0	0–0	0–0	0–0	0–1	2–3	0–1	0–0	3–8
Career statistics
Titles–Finals	0–0	0–0	0–0	0–0	0–0	0–0	0–0	0–0	0–0	0–0	0–0
Year-end ranking	223	180	344	198	250	169	224	142	182		

=== Doubles ===
Current till US Open.

Tournament	2004	2005	2006	2007	2008	2009	2013	W–L
Grand Slam tournaments
Australian Open								0-0
French Open								0–0
Wimbledon				1R				0–1
US Open	1R	2R	1R	3R	1R	1R	1R	3-7
Win–loss	0–1	1–1	0–1	2–2	0–1	0–1	0–1	3–8
Career statistics
Titles–Finals	0–0	0–0	0–0	0–0	0–0	0–0	0–0	0–0
