= 2K25 =

2K25 may refer to:

- The year 2025
- TopSpin 2K25, 2024 video game
- NBA 2K25, 2024 video game
- WWE 2K25, 2025 video game
