= Mafioso =

Mafioso may refer to:

- A mafioso is a mobster that is a member (i.e. a "made man") of the Sicilian Mafia, Italian-American Mafia, or other Italian criminal organizations.
- Mafioso (film), a 1962 Italian black comedy film
- Mafioso rap, a hip hop music subgenre of gangsta rap

== See also ==
- Mafia (disambiguation)
- Mafiosa
