= Mafia: The Old Country =

2025 video game

- Developer: Hangar 13
- Publisher: 2K
- Director: Alex Cox
- Producers: Petr Mikša; Viliam Korbel; Robert Wyle
- Programmer: Valentin Galea
- Artist: Steve Noake
- Writers: Alex Cox; Matthew Aitken
- Composer: BT
- Series: Mafia
- Engine: Unreal Engine 5
- Platforms: PlayStation 5; Windows; Xbox Series X/S
- Release: August 8, 2025
- Genre: Action-adventure
- Mode: Single-player

Mafia: The Old Country is a 2025 action-adventure game developed by Hangar 13 and published by 2K. It is the fourth main entry in the Mafia franchise, and a prequel to the series, taking place decades before the events of the first game. Set in Sicily, Italy, in the early 1900s, the game follows Enzo Favara, a teenaged carusu who becomes embroiled in the rise and fall of the fictional Torrisi crime family.

Mafia: The Old Country was released for PlayStation 5, Windows, and Xbox Series X/S on August 8, 2025. The game received mixed reviews from critics, who praised the game's narrative, characters, Sicilian setting, visuals, and return to a linear structure, but criticized its static open world, dated gameplay mechanics, repetitive combat, and clichéd storytelling. A DLC story expansion titled Man of Honor and an upgraded definitive edition was released on August 14, 2026.

== Gameplay ==
Mafia: The Old Country is a third-person linear, narrative-driven game set in cinematic environments. This brings the game more in alignment with Mafia and Mafia II rather than the more open-world oriented Mafia III. While Mafia: The Old Country is primarily linear, the player can diverge from the primary path during certain story chapters to explore the environment, or sometimes to reach optional objectives.

== Synopsis ==
=== Setting and characters ===
Mafia: The Old Country is set in Sicily during the 1900s in and around the fictional town of San Celeste, which was previously featured in Mafia II. It is based around the origins of the Sicilian Mafia. The narrative follows Enzo Favara (Riccardo Frascari), who journeys from a childhood of indentured labor as a carusu in Sicily's sulfur mines to joining the crime family of Don Bernardo Torrisi (Johnny Santiago).

=== Plot ===
In 1904, 17-year-old Enzo Favara and his friend Gaetano (Giancarlo Sabogal) are carusi working in the sulfur mines of Don Ruggero Spadaro (Lane Townsend). They are overseen by Spadaro's abusive underboss Damiano "Il Merlo" Bastoni and his brother, caporegime Corrado "L'Ombra" Bastoni (both Raphael Corkhill). Enzo and Gaetano prepare to leave Sicily in hope for a better future, but their plan fails when a gas leak causes part of the mine to collapse, burying Gaetano alive along with their money to pay off their debts. Furious after Spadaro and the Bastonis ignored previous warnings about the mine tremors, Enzo scars Il Merlo after a brief knife fight. Enzo runs from the mines and a pursuit ensues. He finds shelter in a stable, but is eventually found by Spadaro’s men, only to be rescued by Don Bernardo Torrisi. After being threatened by Torrisi for trespassing on his territory and potentially breaking the truce between the Spadaro and Torrisi families, Il Merlo and L'Ombra leave. Enzo begins to work for Torrisi under the guidance of underboss Luca Trapani (Alberto Frezza). (Note: Luca is the father of Sam Trapani, a major character from the first Mafia game.) He also meets the Don's nephew Cesare Massaro (Christian Antidormi), Luca's wife Valentina (Monique Hafen Adams), the local parish priest Father Ciccone (Gabriel Burrafato), and the Don's daughter Isabella (Carina Conti), who becomes attracted to him.

Enzo shows his willingness to uphold the Don's reputation, including by subbing in for a jockey in a prestigious horse race and helping Luca and Cesare collect pizzo. Along the way, Enzo meets Torrisi's consigliere Agostino "Tino" Russo (Anthony Skordi) — who dislikes and is distrustful of him; shopkeeper and mechanic Pasquale (Brian Stivale); Don Niccolò Galante (Tony Amendola); and Galante’s grandson Leone "Leo" (Mark Whitten), Torrisi's main allies. (Note: Leo Galante previously appeared as a supporting character in Mafia II and a minor character in Mafia III, serving as a consigliere for the American Mafia.)

In 1905, a visit from the Don's landlord Baron Raffaele Fontanella (Carlo Rota) and his son Gennaro (Davi Santos) ends with Isabella and Gennaro getting kidnapped by a group of bandits demanding money from the baron led by Paolo Messina (Mateo d'Amato). Enzo and Cesare save Isabella but lose Gennaro. Enzo finds Messina's camp, kills all the bandits and rescues Gennaro, earning respect from Torrisi. Later, Torrisi reveals to Enzo the kidnapping was orchestrated by one of Fontanella's former business partners, Girolamo Ludovici (Michael Mazzeo), in an attempt to blackmail the baron into selling his shares of Spadaro's mines. Enzo agrees to kidnap Ludovici and kills him on Tino's orders (while discovering Spadaro demanded a share of Ludovici's presumed fortunes). Admiring Enzo's bravery and loyalty, the Don officially inducts him into the Torrisi family as a soldato. Despite being previously warned by Luca that the Don — who plans to have Isabella marry Gennaro — will likely not approve, Enzo begins a secret relationship with Isabella with hopes that he can gain the Don's permission to marry her through hard work and loyalty.

In 1906, Don Galante and Torrisi collaborate to counterfeit money for the Americans, but reveals one of their employees, Giuseppe, (Note: Giuseppe Palminteri previously appeared in a minor role in Mafia II. For The Old Country, the character is voiced by an unknown actor in the original release and Rick Pasqualone for the definitive edition.) has been incarcerated. A disguised Enzo sneaks into the guardie station and rescues Giuseppe with assistance from Leo and Cesare. Enzo discovers L'Ombra has also been jailed and refuses to release his former master.

Following their success, Leo purchases a car from their American partners and Enzo and Cesare win a race with it. Later, Tino reveals to Enzo that the family has a traitor that reported them to the guardie, forcing them to stop the counterfeiting operation. Encountering a raid led by Major Ettore D'Amico (Aaron Wilton), Enzo and Cesare discover a previously freed L'Ombra was the one who colluded with the authorities. After saving the counterfeiting workers from getting arrested, Enzo and Cesare chase and kill L'Ombra and cover it as a drunken car accident. Torrisi, Luca and Galante then confront Spadaro and Il Merlo over L'Ombra breaking omertà. Spadaro claims L'Ombra acted on his own and denies involvement.

In 1907, as the tensions between the Torrisi and Spadaro families continue, Enzo is sent to investigate a strike at Fontanella's foundry supposedly led by Vincenzo Lorenzetti, a friend of Torrisi. Enzo discovers Lorenzetti was forced to start the protest due to being in debt to Spadaro and finds Lorenzetti beaten to death. Enzo is caught in an ambush by Il Merlo and barely escapes. Tino deduces the strike was a ruse to draw the Torrisi’s out. Both him and Torrisi declare Fontanella is financially ruined and war with Spadaro is inevitable. Later, the Torrisi family is attacked by Il Merlo during San Celeste’s holy festival, where Luca's infant son is getting baptized. Enzo, Cesare and Luca pursue Il Merlo, with Luca delivering the fatal shot.

Following the chaos and carnage brought on by the Torrisi-Spadaro war, Isabella confesses her desire to leave the family behind and move to America with Enzo, who is conflicted between his love for her and his loyalty to Torrisi. Meanwhile, Torrisi is pushed into peace talks with Spadaro by Galante and Fontanella. During the negotiations, Fontanella reveals his intentions to sell his assets, including Torrisi's vineyard, to Spadaro. Torrisi refuses to accept these one-sided terms, and the family is ambushed by Spadaro's men, resulting in the deaths of Don Galante and Luca. In retaliation, Torrisi sends Enzo to Palermo to assassinate both Fontanella and Spadaro, with assistance from fellow associate Father Clemente (Piotr Michael). Enzo is successful in his mission, allowing the Torrisi family to seize Spadaro's holdings, including the mine, which is bequeathed to Enzo as a reward for his service. However, Enzo is disgusted at the idea of returning to the mine he once was a slave in. In addition, Torrisi is growing mad with power as he starts purging anyone who he suspects was loyal to Spadaro.

Having become disillusioned with Torrisi and the criminal lifestyle, Enzo decides to disappear with Isabella, who is pregnant. Leo, who also plans to leave for America, provides Enzo with boat tickets for Empire Bay and advises him never to return. However, Tino confronts the couple, having discovered their plans by forcing Father Ciccone to reveal Isabella's confessions. Cesare brings Enzo to a furious Torrisi, who plans to have Enzo executed and Isabella's pregnancy terminated. Mount Etna erupts, and Enzo battles Cesare in a knife fight, but spares him. Escaping from both Torrisi's men and the volcano eruption, Enzo is confronted by the Don and mortally wounds him in a fight. After reminding Enzo that he cannot change what he is, Torrisi dies while an injured Enzo is fatally stabbed by a remorseful Cesare. Meanwhile, Isabella escapes her captivity after the eruption reaches the vineyard, being forced to kill Tino in the process. As Cesare arrives at the burning vineyard, he informs Isabella of Enzo's death, devastating her. Realizing everything is lost, Cesare urges his cousin to leave and start a new life, while he looks depressingly at the destruction of the Torrisi family. Isabella later boards a ship to Empire Bay, where she tearfully reads a letter written by Enzo, which he handed to her before they were separated.

==== Man of Honor ====
In December 1905, fully made man Enzo tracks down and kills one of Torrisi's men who has been stealing his wine. Enzo later goes to the vineyard, where the Don is visited by Ennio Salieri (Andrew Russell), who has recently gotten out of prison. He requests help to retrieve money stolen by two former associates. Torrisi allows Enzo and Cesare to assist him, as long as they maintain discretion. They travel to a farm to confront Dante Perrotta, who is drugging horses to fix races. Salieri executes him and takes possession of his goods.

A few days later, the trio travel to a sulfur mine rented out by Alfio Zitelli. However, Alfio is already expecting them and ambushes them. They manage to catch up with Alfio, who informs Salieri of a gambling den in a gentlemen's club before the latter kills him. After escaping the mine, Salieri devises a plan to rob the club, which Torrisi will not approve of, to which Cesare and a reluctant Enzo agree.

On the night of the robbery, Enzo and Cesare infiltrate the club while Salieri poses as a patron. Although the robbery is successful, they are attacked by the club's security. Salieri escapes with his cut of the money while Enzo and Cesare fight their way out with their own cash. The next morning, Torrisi scolds the two for the ruckus and says Salieri left for America. He confiscates their cash, but commends them for making it out alive.

== Development ==
In August 2022, Hangar 13 general manager Roman Hladík confirmed in an interview marking the 20th anniversary of Mafia that Hangar 13 had "started work on an all-new Mafia project" but it would still be "a few years away". With the fifth Mafia title, Hangar 13 sought to go "back to the roots of what fans love about the Mafia franchise," according to Hangar 13 president Nick Baynes. This meant a return to "deep linear narrative" with a setting more aligned with the first Mafia game.

Mafia: The Old Country includes full audio dubbing in English, French, German, Spanish, Czech, and Russian, but not Italian, despite the game addressing the origins of organized crime in Sicily. Italian localization can only been found as a subtitle option. In response to the controversy, Hangar 13 announced that the game would offer voice acting in the Sicilian language, saying that "Authenticity is at the heart of the Mafia franchise". In May 2025, it was announced that 2K and Hangar 13 had relied on the collaboration of the Italian studio Stormind Games to support authenticity.

Mafia: The Old Country was developed using Unreal Engine 5 with Alex Cox serving as the game's director. Cox said that moving to Unreal Engine 5 has "allowed for an even higher level of visual fidelity than previous Mafia titles". Mafia III and Mafia: Definitive Edition used the proprietary Fusion Engine, an upgraded version of the Illusion Engine that was used in Mafia II.

Within the Unreal Engine 5 toolset, Mafia: The Old Country utilizes the Nanite level of detail system, software Lumen for ray traced global illumination and reflections and Epic Games' MetaHuman framework for creating lifelike facial animations. Hangar 13 started testing the feasibility of Unreal Engine 5 development by recreating the San Celeste market square environment from Mafia II as it has the same Sicilian setting as The Old Country. What drew Hangar 13 towards developing in Unreal Engine 5 was the integration of features like MetaHuman directly into the engine rather than having to build their own tools that comes with using a custom engine. The time saved from not having to build custom development tools allowed the studio to "focus on the gameplay, the visuals, the storytelling, the cinematics" according to Hangar 13 president Nick Baynes.

Mafia: The Old Country includes support for Variable refresh rate, support for 120Hz displays and Higher Dynamic Resolution in both Quality and Performance modes on PlayStation 5 Pro.

== Release ==
Mafia: The Old Country was revealed via a teaser trailer at Gamescom: Opening Night Live 2024 on August 20, 2024. A full trailer debuted at The Game Awards 2024 on December 12, though it was leaked several hours earlier. On July 7, 2025, the gameplay trailer was released on YouTube. This video included the mission briefing, gun selection, driving, combat, and stealth gameplay. The game was released for PlayStation 5, Windows, and Xbox Series X/S on August 8, 2025.

On August 14, 2025, Hangar 13 announced that a Free Ride mode would be included in an upcoming update, allowing the player to engage in additional activities outside of the main story such as bonus missions and races. The date for the Free Ride update was announced on November 19, 2025 as November 20, 2025. An expansion titled Man of Honor was released on August 14, 2026. It adds two additional story chapters that take place in the middle of the main campaign, and reintroduces a young Ennio Salieri, the main Don of the original Mafia game.

== Reception ==
=== Critical reception ===
Reception

Aggregate scores
Aggregator	Score
Metacritic	(PC) 73/100 (PS5) 73/100 (XSXS) 73/100
OpenCritic	66% recommend

Review scores
Publication	Score
Destructoid	8/10
Digital Trends	3.5/5
Eurogamer	3/5
Famitsu	9/10, 8/10, 8/10, 9/10
Game Informer	6/10
GameSpot	6/10
IGN	8/10
NME	3/5
PC Gamer (US)	45/100
PCGamesN	8/10
Push Square	6/10
The Guardian	3/5
Video Games Chronicle	4/5

Mafia: The Old Country received "mixed or average" reviews from critics, according to review aggregator website Metacritic. OpenCritic determined that 66% of critics recommended the game. In Japan, four critics from Famitsu gave the game a total score of 34 out of 40.

GameSpot criticised its "shallow mechanics and dated design", but praised its strong cast of characters and "beautiful rendition of 1900s Sicily". Digital Foundry listed Mafia: The Old Country among the best game graphics of 2025, citing its "incredible art and handsomely lit countrysides".

The New York Times included Mafia: The Old Country among its top 10 video games of 2025, calling it "an intimate crime drama with a tightly paced narrative".

=== Sales ===
According to Strauss Zelnick, the CEO of Take-Two Interactive, the game had sold better than expected, and its commercial performance reaffirmed Hangar 13's direction to continue making cinematic titles.

=== Accolades ===
Year	Award	Category	Result	Ref.
2025	Golden Joystick Awards	Best Storytelling	Nominated	
2025	16th Hollywood Music in Media Awards	Score - Video Game (Console & PC)	Nominated	
2026	15th New York Game Awards	Herman Melville Award for Best Writing	Nominated	
2026	24th Game Audio Network Guild Awards	Dialogue of the Year	Nominated	
2026	73rd Golden Reel Awards	Best Sound Editing - Game Dialogue	Nominated	
2026	22nd British Academy Games Awards	British Game	Nominated	
2026	NAVGTR Awards	Best Art Direction, Period Influence	Nominated	
2026	NAVGTR Awards	Best Direction in a Game, Cinema	Nominated	
2026	NAVGTR Awards	Best Game, Franchise Adventure	Nominated	
2026	NAVGTR Awards	Best Sound Editing in a Game, Cinema	Nominated	
2026	UK Video Game Awards	UK Game of the Year	Nominated	
2026	UK Video Game Awards	Best UK Console Game	Nominated	
2026	Develop:Star Awards 2026	Best Visual Art	Nominated	
2026	Develop:Star Awards 2026	Best Narrative	Nominated	
2026	World Soundtrack Awards	Game Music Award	Longlisted	
