= Top Spin 3 =

2008 video game

- Players Maria Sharapova, Roger Federer and Andy Roddick appear on the U.S. cover art for the game. Roddick was replaced by Andy Murray (UK version) and by Rafael Nadal (Spanish version).
- Developer: PAM Development
- Publisher: 2K
- Platforms: PlayStation 3 Wii; Xbox 360; Nintendo DS
- Release: EU: June 20, 2008; NA: June 23, 2008; AU: June 27, 2008; EU: July 11, 2008 (DS); AU: August 2008 (DS)
- Genre: Sports
- Modes: Single-player, multiplayer

Top Spin 3 is the third title in the Top Spin series of video games. The game was developed by PAM Development and published by 2K. New game elements include real-time weather effects, more options of professional tennis players, an in-depth character creation tool and new unparalleled gameplay mechanics. It also features impressive advancements in an audio/visual sense with improved Dolby Digital surround sound and "Evolutionary" visuals. Top Spin 4 was released as a sequel about three years later.

== Features ==
Top Spin 3 incorporates various new features including:

- The incorporation of the right thumbstick, allow for more precise movements and shot variety
- World tennis players' movements and likeness are accurately depicted along with apparel.
- Tennis Legends are now included in the roster of playable licensed players.
- All-new soundtrack: New music is included featuring Jamiroquai, Calvin Harris, Boys Like Girls, The Go! Team, The Stone Roses, and Franz Ferdinand with 'Huddle Formation' being the menu song.
- World Tour: Players are given the opportunity to participate in ranked online tournaments and matches. A new season starts every 1st and 16th day of the month.

=== Wii version ===
The Wii version features motion controls, several venues including three Grand Slams, and multiplayer party games. It features 16 licensed players. This version does not contain online multiplayer gameplay nor does it contain career mode. It runs on a modified Top Spin 2 engine, and features stylized graphics.

Top Spin 3 includes 20 playable professional tennis players including today's superstars, and past professionals. It also contains 7 fictitious male professional players and 13 female professional fictitious players.

== Reception ==
Reception

Aggregate score
Aggregator	Score			
Aggregator	DS	PS3	Wii	Xbox 360
Metacritic	65/100	75/100	68/100	78/100

Review scores
Publication	Score			
Publication	DS	PS3	Wii	Xbox 360
Destructoid	N/A	8/10	N/A	N/A
Eurogamer	7/10	N/A	N/A	8/10
Famitsu	26/40	29/40	N/A	29/40 (360) 27/40
Game Informer	N/A	7.75/10	N/A	7.75/10
GamePro	N/A	4/5	N/A	N/A
GameRevolution	N/A	B	N/A	N/A
GameSpot	N/A	8/10	N/A	8/10
GameSpy	N/A	3.5/5	3.5/5	3.5/5
GameTrailers	N/A	N/A	N/A	7.3/10
GameZone	5/10	8/10	6.7/10	8/10
IGN	8/10	(AU) 8/10 (US) 7.9/10	7/10	(AU) 8/10 (US) 7.8/10
Nintendo Power	6/10	N/A	7/10	N/A
Official Xbox Magazine (US)	N/A	N/A	N/A	9/10
PlayStation: The Official Magazine	N/A	3/5	N/A	N/A
411Mania	N/A	N/A	5.4/10	8.2/10

The PlayStation 3 and Xbox 360 versions received "generally favorable reviews", while the DS and Wii versions received "mixed or average reviews", according to the review aggregation website Metacritic. In Japan, where the game was ported and published by D3 Publisher for the PS3 and Xbox 360 versions on July 30, 2009; for the Wii version on September 3, 2009; and for the DS version on October 15, 2009, Famitsu gave it a score of two sevens, one eight and one seven for the first two console versions, and one seven, one six, one seven and one six for the DS version; while Famitsu Xbox 360 gave the game a score of one six and three sevens for a total of 27 out of 40.

It was a nominee for Best Sports Game for the Nintendo DS by IGN for their 2008 video game awards.
