= Mafiosa =

Mafiosa may refer to:

== Music ==
- "Mafiosa" (song), 2018 song by Lartiste
- "Mafiosa", 2019 song by Node (singer) from Samme vej
- "Mafiosa", 2021 single by Nathy Peluso
- "Mafiosa", 2023 single by Junior H and Grupo Marca Registrada
- "Mafiosa", 2024 song by Jul (rapper) from Mise à jour
- "Mafiosa", 2025 single by Inugami Korone

== Other uses ==
- Mafiosa (TV series), French crime drama
- Mafiosa, 2017 entry in Catherine Doyle's Blood for Blood trilogy
- Mafiosa, AEW stage name for former Women of Wrestling personnel Noelle Giorgi
- Mafiosa, 2010 independent film starring Fiona Dourif

== See also ==
- Mafioso (disambiguation)
- Pax Mafiosa
