= Top Spin 4 =

2011 video game

- European cover art (exc. UK) featuring Roger Federer, Rafael Nadal and Serena Williams respectively
- Developer: 2K Czech
- Publisher: 2K
- Engine: PAM Engine
- Platforms: PlayStation 3 Wii; Xbox 360
- Release: NA: March 15, 2011; PAL: March 18, 2011
- Genre: Sports

Top Spin 4 is a tennis video game developed by 2K Czech and published by 2K released on the PlayStation 3, Wii, and Xbox 360 consoles. The game features licensed professional players, venues and equipment. The game was released on March 15, 2011 in America, and was released on March 18 in the PAL region. The PS3 version supports the PlayStation Move and is also compatible in 3D. The Xbox 360 version does not support the Kinect but is 3D compatible.

== Player Roster ==
Men: Andre Agassi, Andy Murray, Andy Roddick, Bernard Tomic, Bjorn Borg, Boris Becker, Gilles Simon, Ivan Lendl, James Blake, Jim Courier, Michael Chang, Nikolay Davydenko, Novak Djokovic, Patrick Rafter, Pete Sampras, Rafael Nadal, Roger Federer, Stanislas Wawrinka

Women: Ana Ivanovic, Caroline Wozniacki, Dinara Safina, Eugenie Bouchard, Jelena Jankovic, Serena Williams, Vera Zvonareva

== Development ==
Top Spin 4 was announced by 2K Sports in September 2010 for the PlayStation 3, Xbox 360 and Wii. The game was developed by 2K Czech following the closure of previous Top Spin developer PAM Development in 2008. Much of the core development team from Top Spin 3 subsequently moved to 2K Czech and continued work on the series.

One of the development team's principal goals was to make the game more accessible than Top Spin 3, whose control system had been criticised for presenting a steep learning curve to inexperienced players. 2K Czech redesigned the controls so that the four principal types of shot—flat, slice, topspin and lob—were assigned to the face buttons while retaining timing, positioning and shot selection as important elements for experienced players. The developers sought to make the controls easier to learn without reducing the simulation's tactical depth.

To assist new players, the game introduced optional on-court aids indicating shot timing, placement and other aspects of play, alongside an expanded training system. The assists were intended to allow inexperienced players to learn the game's mechanics while leaving its more advanced systems available to experienced players.

The PlayStation 3 version was developed with support for the PlayStation Move controller and stereoscopic 3D. Gameplay designer Rémi Ercolani said that implementing motion controls required the team to reconsider the game's existing control scheme while attempting to maintain the same balance between accessibility and depth offered by conventional controllers.

== Reception ==
Reception

Aggregate score
Aggregator	Score		
Aggregator	PS3	Wii	Xbox 360
Metacritic	82/100	54/100	84/100

Review scores
Publication	Score		
Publication	PS3	Wii	Xbox 360
Eurogamer	8/10	N/A	8/10
Famitsu	28/40	N/A	28/40
Game Informer	8.5/10	N/A	8.5/10
GameSpot	9/10	4/10	9/10
GameZone	8/10	N/A	N/A
IGN	8.5/10	N/A	8.5/10
Nintendo Power	N/A	7/10	N/A
Official Xbox Magazine (US)	N/A	N/A	8.5/10
PlayStation: The Official Magazine	8/10	N/A	N/A
VideoGamer.com	8/10	N/A	8/10
Metro	N/A	N/A	8/10

The PlayStation 3 and Xbox 360 versions of Top Spin 4 received generally favourable reviews, while reception of the Wii version was considerably more mixed. Metacritic recorded scores of 82 out of 100 for the PlayStation 3 version and 84 for the Xbox 360 version, compared with 54 for the Wii release.

Mark Walton of GameSpot awarded the PlayStation 3 and Xbox 360 versions 9 out of 10, praising the realistic physics, responsive controls, animation, sound design and depth of the online and offline career modes. He particularly praised the balance between simulation and accessibility, noting that tutorials and shot assists made the game easier for newcomers without diminishing its tactical depth. Walton described it as the standard against which subsequent tennis games would be judged, although he criticised some of the character faces.

Matt Helgeson of Game Informer awarded the game 8.5 out of 10. He praised the simplified control scheme, fluid animations, television-style presentation and career mode, considering the timing-based gameplay easier to understand than the mechanics of Top Spin 3 while retaining considerable depth. Helgeson was less enthusiastic about the PlayStation Move implementation, citing problems with swing detection and preferring the conventional controller.

Chris Schilling of The Observer praised the game's measured pace, authentic player movement, baseline rallies and career mode, as well as the inclusion of retired players including Andre Agassi, Ivan Lendl and Pete Sampras. He nevertheless found play at the net comparatively slow and awkward and criticised some close-up player likenesses and repetitive vocal effects.

The Wii version was received substantially less favourably. GameSpot awarded it 4 out of 10, criticising its unresponsive motion controls, low-detail visuals, inconsistent frame rate and repetitive career-mode minigames. Walton found that the Wii Remote frequently failed to interpret swings correctly and considered the version significantly inferior to its PlayStation 3 and Xbox 360 counterparts.

The game was also recognised in its developers' home country, receiving an award for the best Czech video game of the year in the 2011 Booom competition.

== Legacy ==
Top Spin 4 developed a lasting reputation as one of the leading tennis simulation games. In 2017, when Tennis World Tour was announced, its development team included several former Top Spin developers. Pierre André, who had served as a producer on Top Spin 4, described the game as a "spiritual successor" to Top Spin 4.

When the Top Spin series returned in 2024 with TopSpin 2K25, retrospective coverage continued to identify Top Spin 4 as a benchmark for the genre. GameSpot wrote that the series had remained held in reverence since the release of Top Spin 4, which it noted had received critical acclaim, and compared the content of TopSpin 2K25 unfavourably with the earlier game's higher points. Operation Sports similarly stated that, for many players, Top Spin 4 still held the reputation of being the best tennis video game ever made thirteen years after its release, and described later tennis games as having failed to match the depth of its gameplay.

AVForums also described Top Spin 4 in 2024 as widely regarded as one of the greatest tennis games ever made, noting that the official series had ended with the game for thirteen years before the release of TopSpin 2K25.

In a 2025 retrospective ranking of tennis video games, Operation Sports described Top Spin 4 as the high point of the Top Spin series and stated that many tennis video game enthusiasts continued to regard it as the "gold standard" for realistic tennis games.

== Future ==
On 16 January 2024, a new installment titled TopSpin 2K25 was announced.
