= Mafia (series) =

Video game series

- Series logo for 2015–2025
- Genre: Action-adventure
- Developers: 2K Czech (2002–2017); Hangar 13 (2014–)
- Publishers: Gathering of Developers (2002, 2004); 2K (2007–)
- Creator: Daniel Vávra
- Platforms: macOS; PlayStation 2 PlayStation 3 PlayStation 4 PlayStation 5 Windows; Xbox; Xbox 360; Xbox One; Xbox Series X/S
- First release: Mafia; August 29, 2002
- Latest release: Mafia: The Old Country; August 8, 2025

Mafia is a series of action-adventure video games originally created and developed by 2K Czech (formerly Illusion Softworks). Since the third installment, the games have been developed by Hangar 13 and published by 2K. The franchise consists of four mainline installments, along with a remake of the first game, a remastered version of the second game, and two spin-offs for mobile devices.

Games in the Mafia series are set in fictional locales modelled after real American or Italian cities, and typically feature historical settings, from Great Depression-era Lost Heaven in the first game, to 1960s New Bordeaux in Mafia III, and multiple towns across the Sicilian valley in the 1900s in Mafia: The Old Country. Gameplay focuses on an open world environment where players complete missions to progress an overall story, albeit in a more linear manner than other open world series, such as Grand Theft Auto. The series centers on different protagonists who become involved with the Mafia in one way or another, either attempting to rise through its ranks or bring it down for wronging them. The antagonists are commonly characters who have betrayed the protagonist or their organisation, or characters who have the most impact impeding the protagonist's progress.

Most games in the franchise have been well received by critics, with praise for their complex narratives, open world design, and focus on realism, although Mafia III reviewed significantly worse than the others due to its repetitive gameplay structure and technical issues. The Mafia series has also been commercially successful, with combined lifetime sales of over 34 million copies sold.

== Games ==
| Year | Title | Developer | Home release | | |
| Year | Title | Developer | Console | Computer | Mobile |
Main series
| 2002 | Mafia | Illusion Softworks | PS2, Xbox | Windows | |
| 2010 | Mafia II | 2K Czech | PS3, Xbox 360 | Windows, OS X | |
| 2016 | Mafia III | Hangar 13 | PS4, Xbox One | Windows, OS X | |
| 2025 | Mafia: The Old Country | Hangar 13 | PS5, Xbox Series X/S | Windows | |
Remade entries
| 2020 | Mafia: Definitive Edition | Hangar 13 | PS5, Xbox Series X/S, PS4, Xbox One | Windows | |
Story expansion packs
| 2010 | Mafia II: The Betrayal of Jimmy | 2K Czech | PS3, Xbox 360 | Windows | |
| 2010 | Mafia II: Jimmy's Vendetta | 2K Czech | PS3, Xbox 360 | Windows | |
| 2010 | Mafia II: Joe's Adventures | 2K Czech | PS3, Xbox 360 | Windows | |
| 2017 | Mafia III: Faster, Baby! | Hangar 13 | PS4, Xbox One | Windows, OS X | |
| 2017 | Mafia III: Stones Unturned | Hangar 13 | PS4, Xbox One | Windows | |
| 2017 | Mafia III: Sign of the Times | Hangar 13 | PS4, Xbox One | Windows | |
| 2026 | Mafia: The Old Country – Man of Honor | Hangar 13 | PS5, Xbox Series X/S | Windows | |
Remastered editions
| 2020 | Mafia II: Definitive Edition | d3t | PS4, Xbox One | Windows | |
Mobile spin-offs
| 2010 | Mafia II Mobile | Twistbox Games | | | Mobile phone |
| 2016 | Mafia III: Rivals | Cat Daddy Games | | | iOS, Android |

Release timeline
| 2002 | Mafia |
2003–2009
| 2010 | Mafia II + DLC |
2011–2015
| 2016 | Mafia III |
| 2017 | Mafia III DLC |
2018–2019
| 2020 | Mafia II: Definitive Edition |
| 2020 | Mafia: Definitive Edition |
2021–2024
| 2025 | Mafia: The Old Country |
| 2026 | Mafia: TOC Man of Honor DLC |

=== Mafia (2002) ===
The first game in the series, Mafia (known during pre-release as Mafia: The City of Lost Heaven), was developed by Illusion Softworks and published by Gathering of Developers for Microsoft Windows in August 2002. It was later ported to the PlayStation 2 and Xbox in February 2004 and March 2004, respectively. Set in the fictional city of Lost Heaven, loosely based on Chicago, from 1930 to 1938, the game follows Tommy Angelo, a taxi driver-turned-mobster, and his rise and fall within the Salieri crime family.

=== Mafia II (2010) ===
Mafia II is the standalone sequel to Mafia and was developed by 2K Czech and published by 2K Games for Windows, PlayStation 3, and Xbox 360 in August 2010. A Mac OS X version was also released in December 2011. Set in the fictional metropolis of Empire Bay, inspired by several American cities but primarily by New York, from 1945 to 1951, the game follows Vito Scaletta, a young Sicilian-American criminal and World War II veteran, who becomes caught in a power struggle among Empire Bay's various Mafia families while attempting to pay back his late father's debts and secure a better lifestyle.

==== Downloadable content ====
On May 26, 2010, ahead of the game's release, four content packs were announced as pre-order bonuses in America and Europe, each one available through different retailers. The Vegas Pack containing two additional cars and suits for Vito and the War Hero Pack containing two military-style vehicles and suits were available from GameStop and EBGames. The Renegade Pack containing two sports cars and two jackets was available from Amazon and the Greaser Pack featuring two hot rods and two suits was available to Best Buy customers. All pre-order packs were available for purchase as game add-ons on the PlayStation Network, Xbox Live, and Steam.

Following Mafia II's release, 2K Games supported the game with three major downloadable content (DLC) packs. The first pack, titled The Betrayal of Jimmy, was initially released as a PlayStation 3 exclusive, and features a new storyline starring the titular Jimmy, a gun-for-hire who works for various criminal outfits in Empire Bay. The second pack, titled Jimmy's Vendetta, was released in September 2010 and is a continuation of Jimmy's story. The third pack, titled Joe's Adventures, was released in November 2010 and follows Vito's best friend Joe Barbaro during Vito's imprisonment in the main Mafia II storyline.

A version of Mafia II containing the base game and most DLC packs, titled Mafia II: Director's Cut, was released by Feral Interactive in December 2011.

=== Mafia III (2016) ===
Mafia III was developed by Hangar 13 and published by 2K Games for Windows, PlayStation 4, and Xbox One in October 2016. It was later released for macOS in May 2017, and for Google Stadia in October 2021. Set within the fictional city of New Bordeaux, based on New Orleans, in 1968, the game follows former criminal and Vietnam veteran Lincoln Clay, who is forced to return to a life of crime to help his adoptive family settle problems with the local branch of the Mafia. After the Mafia betrays and murders his family, Lincoln embarks on a quest for revenge while slowly building a criminal empire and seizing power from other criminal organisations in the city.

==== Downloadable content ====
Similarly to Mafia II, 2K Games released three story-driven DLC packs for Mafia III. The first, titled Faster, Baby!, was released in March 2017; it introduces the town of Sinclair Parish, located on the outskirts of New Bordeaux, and follows Lincoln's efforts to expose the corruption of its racist sheriff, Walter Beaumont, with the help of civil rights activist Charles Laveau and his daughter Roxy. The second, titled Stones Unturned, was released in May 2017, and sees Lincoln and his friend John Donovan teaming up to stop former CIA agent and Donovan's nemesis Connor Aldridge, who stole a nuclear bomb in hopes of ending the Vietnam War. The final DLC, titled Sign of the Times, was released in July 2017, and follows Lincoln's investigation of a satanic cult called the Ensanglante.

=== Mafia: Definitive Edition (2020) ===
Mafia: Definitive Edition is a remake of the original Mafia game, developed by Hangar 13 and published by 2K Games for Windows, PlayStation 4, and Xbox One in September 2020. The remake builds upon the gameplay systems introduced in Mafia III while adding several new features, such as the introduction of motorcycles to the series, and closely follows the plot of the original, with several alterations, mainly to the dialogue and locations.

=== Mafia: The Old Country (2025) ===
A fourth main installment in the series following Mafia III was first announced in August 2022. On August 20, 2024, the game's title was revealed to be Mafia: The Old Country, confirming it would be a prequel to the first game, set in 1900s Sicily and exploring the origins of the Mafia. On December 12, 2024, a full trailer debuted at the Game Awards, providing further details about the setting, narrative and gameplay, as well as a release date of Summer 2025. Unlike its predecessors, Mafia: The Old Country features more linear gameplay and a bigger focus on its storytelling, but still maintaining the open-world structure. The game follows Enzo Favara, who joins the Torrisi crime family to escape his indentured labor in Sicily's sulfur mines.

=== Bundles and remasters ===
On September 25, 2020, the Mafia Trilogy bundle was released, featuring Mafia: Definitive Edition, Mafia II: Definitive Edition (a remastered version of Mafia II and all its DLC) and Mafia III: Definitive Edition (a version that includes its DLC). The Mafia II and Mafia III Definitive Editions had been available separately on May 19, 2020 to promote the announcement of Mafia: Definitive Edition.

On August 14, 2026, 2K Games released the Mafia: The Omertà Collection bundle for the PlayStation 5, Xbox Series X/S and Microsoft Windows. The bundle consists of the previous Mafia Trilogy from September 2020, alongside Mafia: The Old Country - The Definitive Edition, which consists of the original game and its Man of Honor DLC. The version of Mafia: Definitive Edition included within this bundle features a 60 FPS upgrade, alongside other enhancements. A version of Mafia III with the same upgrades was later released on October 8, 2026, to celebrate its tenth anniversary. A rating for a pending version of Mafia II was discovered by gaming journalists on the ESRB rating board, but has yet to be released.

=== Spin-off games ===
To coincide with the release of Mafia II, a mobile version was developed by Twistbox Games and published by Oasys Mobile; the iOS version was published by Connect2Media. However, the game is not a direct adaptation of Mafia II, and instead serves as a prequel that bridges the gap between the first two Mafia games. The story follows Marco Russotto, a soldato in the Salieri crime family and the nephew of the family's gunsmith Vincenzo, who travels to Empire Bay to find and kill Tommy Angelo as revenge for his betrayal of the family. The game features two possible endings, but only one is canon and leads into the events of Mafia II.

A mobile role-playing game titled Mafia III: Rivals was released to tie-in with the main game, developed by Cat Daddy Games for Android and iOS. Rivals is presented as a role-playing game with turn-based combat mechanics. A free demo of Mafia III was released on March 28, 2017, the same day as the first downloadable content pack of the game.

== Common elements ==
=== Gameplay ===
Each game in the Mafia series allows the player to take on the role of a criminal in a large city, typically an individual who plans to rise through the ranks of organized crime. The player character is given various missions by friends and mafia figures in the city underworld which must be completed to progress through the storyline.

The use of vehicles in an explorable urban environment provides a basic simulation of a working city, complete with pedestrians who generally obey traffic signals. Further details are used to flesh out an open-ended atmosphere that has been used in several other games. Traffic rules and regulations are stringently and realistically enforced in the games; failure to obey them through speeding or reckless driving are usually met with penalties such as citations, with further violations resulting in efforts by law enforcement to retaliate more aggressively and thus incapacitate the player.

=== Setting ===
Games in the Mafia series are set in fictional locales modeled after American cities, at various points in time during the 20th century, when the American Mafia was at the height of its power. Mafia is set in Lost Heaven during the 1930s. Lost Heaven is loosely based on New York City, Chicago and San Francisco. Mafia II is set in the 1940s and early 1950s in Empire Bay, which is a fictional version of New York, with influences from Chicago, San Francisco, Los Angeles, Boston and Detroit. Mafia III is set in the late 1960s in New Bordeaux, a fictionalized version of New Orleans.

=== Characters ===
| Character | Mafia | | Mafia II | Mafia III | Mafia: The Old Country |
|---|---|---|---|---|---|
| Character | 2002 | 2020 | 2010 | 2016 | 2025 |
Cast
| Thomas "Tommy" Angelo | Michael Sorvino | Andrew Bongiorno | Michael Sorvino | | |
| Vittorio Antonio "Vito" Scaletta | Bill Buell | Rick Pasqualone | Rick Pasqualone | Rick Pasqualone | |
| Joe Barbaro | Character is Silent | Character is Silent | Bobby Costanzo | Character is Silent | |
| Lincoln Clay | | | | Alex Hernandez | |
| Enzo Favara | | | | | Riccardo Frascari |
| Don Ennio Salieri | George DiCenzo | Glenn Taranto | Mentioned | | Andrew Russell |
| Paulie Lombardo | William DeMeo | Jeremy Luke | | | |
| Samuele "Sam" Trapani | Matt Servitto | Don DiPetta | | | Character is Silent |
| Francis "Frank" Colletti | Dan Grimaldi | Steven J. Oliver | | | Mentioned |
| Detective John Norman | David O'Brien | Dameon Clarke | | | |
| Sarah Angelo | Cara Bouno | Bella Popa | | | |
| Vincenzo "Vinnie" Ricci | John Tormey | Paul Tassone | | | |
| Ralph | Jeff Gurner | Ward Roberts | | | |
| Luigi Marino | Paul Scannapieco | Robert Catrini | | | |
| Don Marcu Morello | John Doman | Saul Stein | | | |
| Sergio Morello | Renaud Sebbane | Matt Borlenghi | | | |
| Lucas Bertone | Jeff Gurner | Tommy Beck | | | |
| Councilor Roberto Ghilotti | | Paul Ghiringhelli | | | |
| Lou | | Kenny Lorenzetti | | | |
| Dino | | Anthony Bonaventura | | | |
| Joey Crackers | | Guy Nardulli | | | |
| Billy Ghilotti | | Jarrett Sleeper | | | |
| Johnny | | Jason Kyle | | | |
| Michelle | Laura Maxwell | Maggie McGovern | | | |
| Salvatore | | Jordi Caballero | | | |
| William Gates | | Myko Olivier | | | |
| Carlo | | Joe Chambrello | | | |
| Leone "Leo" Galante | | | Frank Ashmore | Frank Ashmore | Mark Whitten |
| Henry Tomasino | | | Sonny Marinelli | | |
| Federico "Derek" Pappalardo | | | Bobby Costanzo | | |
| Steve Coyne | | | Mark Mintz | | |
| Frank Vinci | | | Larry Kenney | | Nicolas Roye |
| Alberto Clemente | | | Nolan North | | |
| Luca Gurino | | | André Sogliuzzo | | |
| Carlo Falcone | | | André Sogliuzzo | | |
| Eddie Scarpa | | | Joe Hanna | | |
| Francesca Scaletta | | | Jeannie Elias | | |
| Maria Scaletta | | | Joan Copeland | | |
| Eric Reilly | | | Brian Bloom | | |
| Giuseppe Palminteri | | | Rick Pasqualone | | Rick Pasqualone (Note: Guiseppe was originally voiced by an unknown voice actor; following the release of the Man of Honor DLC, his lines have been re-recorded by Pasqualone.) |
| Mike Bruski | | | John Mariano | | |
| Maria Agnello | | | Carol Ann Susi | | |
| Brian O'Neill | | | Liam O'Brien | | |
| Harry Marsden | | | Joe Sabatino | | |
| Sidney Pen / "The Fat Man" | | | John Capodice | | |
| Marty Santorelli | | | Jason Spisak | | |
| Frankie Potts | | | Jason J. Lewis | | |
| Harvey "Beans" Epstein | | | Jerry Sroka | | |
| Antonio "Tony Balls" Balsamo | | | Phil Idrissi | | |
| Mickey Desmond | | | Joe Barrett | | |
| Bruno Levine | | | Michael H. Ingram | | |
| Zhe Yun Wong | | | James Sie | | |
| Jimmy | | | Unknown | | |
| Rocco | | | Mark Mintz | | |
| John Donovan | | | | Lane Compton | |
| Father James Ballard | | | | Gordon Greene | |
| Cassandra | | | | Erica Tazel | |
| Thomas Burke | | | | Barry O'Rourke | |
| Sal Marcano | | | | Jay Acovone | |
| Giorgi Marcano | | | | Mercer Boffey | |
| "Uncle" Lou Marcano | | | | Brad Leland | |
| Tommy Marcano | | | | Christopher Corey Smith | |
| Olivia Marcano | | | | Erin Matthews | |
| Nicki Burke | | | | Dana Blasingame | |
| Danny Burke | | | | Jeff Schine | |
| Sammy Robinson | | | | Leith M. Burke | |
| Ellis Robinson | | | | Justice Nnanna | |
| Jonathan Maguire | | | | Cully Fredricksen | |
| Alma Diaz | | | | Danay Garcia | |
| Emmanuel Lazare | | | | Lyriq Bent | |
| Ritchie Doucet | | | | Matt Lowe | |
| Roman "The Butcher" Barbieri | | | | Joey Diaz | |
| Michael Grecco | | | | Marrick Smith | |
| Frank Pagani | | | | Jack Conley | |
| Enzo Conti | | | | Matt Gottlieb | |
| Tony Derazio | | | | Gibson Frazier | |
| Remy Duvall | | | | Nolan North | |
| Nino Santangelo | | | | Jordi Caballero | |
| U.S. Senator Richard Blake | | | | Gene Scandur | |
| Baka | | | | Asante Jones | |
| Jesse | | | | Jonathan Murphy | |
| Judge Cornelius Holden | | | | Richard Epcar | |
| Police Chief Earl Wilson | | | | Glenn Taranto | |
| State Senator Walter Jacobs | | | | Cris D'Annunzio | |
| Alvarez | | | | Alex Ruiz | |
| Hollis Dupree | | | | Casey Sander | |
| Joe | | | | Anthony Michael Jones | |
| Alex Ribaldi | | | | Chris Tardio | |
| Stephen Degarmo | | | | Matlock Zumsteg | |
| Charles Laveau / "The Voice" | | | | Dave Fennoy | |
| Roxy Laveau | | | | Kalilah Harris | |
| Sheriff Slim Beaumont | | | | John Edward Lee | |
| Mitch "M.J." Decosta | | | | Thomas Gorrebeeck | |
| Ezekiel Dandridge | | | | Mahmoud Osman | |
| Connor Aldridge | | | | Andy Davoli | |
| Robert Marshall | | | | Cayleb Long | |
| Chuckie | | | | Frank Diaz | |
| Anna McGee | | | | Sofia Vassilieva | |
| Bonnie Harless | | | | Janna Bossier | |
| Oscar | | | | Unknown | |
| Lily Robinson | | | | Unknown | |
| Don Bernardo Torrisi | | | | | Johnny Santiago |
| Isabella Torrisi | | | | | Carina Conti |
| Gianluca "Luca" Trapani | | | | | Alberto Frezza |
| Valentina Trapani | | | | | Monique Hafen Adams |
| Cesare Massaro | | | | | Christian Antidormi |
| Agostino "Tino" Russo | | | | | Anthony Skordi |
| Father Ciccone | | | | | Gabriel Burrafato |
| Pasquale | | | | | Brian Stivale |
| Don Niccolò Galante | | | | | Tony Amendola |
| Don Ruggero Spadaro | | | | | Lane Townsend |
| Baron Raffaele Fontanella | | | | | Carlo Rota |
| Gennaro Fontanella | | | | | Davi Santos |
| Gaetano | | | | | Giancarlo Sabogal |
| Damiano "Il Merlo" Bastoni | | | | | Raphael Corkhill |
| Corrado "L'Ombra" Bastoni | | | | | Raphael Corkhill |
| Paolo Messina | | | | | Mateo d'Amato |
| Girolamo Ludovici | | | | | Michael Mazzeo |
| Major Ettore D'Amico | | | | | Aaron Wilton |

Note: A gray cell indicates character does not appear in that medium.

== Reception ==
Sales and aggregate review scores As of September 24, 2020.
| Game | Units sold | Metacritic |
|---|---|---|
| Mafia | 3 million | (PC) 88/100 (PS2) 65/100 (XBOX) 66/100 |
| Mafia II | 5 million | (PC) 77/100 (PS3) 75/100 (X360) 74/100 |
| Mafia III | 7 million | (PC) 62/100 (PS4) 68/100 (XONE) 67/100 |
| Mafia: Definitive Edition | | (PC) 78/100 (PS4) 76/100 (XONE) 79/100 |
| Mafia II: Definitive Edition | | (PC) 72/100 (PS4) 56/100 (XONE) 66/100 |
| Mafia: The Old Country | | (PC) 73/100 (PS5) 73/100 (XSXS) 73/100 |

The first two games in the series have received generally positive reviews, while the third game received mixed reviews. The series have been praised for their narratives, with the first installment particularly praised for its realism in its gameplay. However, Mafia II was criticized for its linear open-world design, and Mafia III was criticized for its repetitive gameplay and technical issues.

Mafia: Trilogy, which collects Mafia: Definitive Edition, the 2020 remake of the first Mafia, as well as the Definitive Editions of Mafia II and Mafia III, generated lifetime sales of more than 2 million units by November 2020.

=== Controversies ===
Mafia II has generated some controversy following its release. Sonia Alfano, a member of the European Parliament and president of Italy's association for the families of Mafia victims and whose father was murdered by the Mafia, called for the game to be banned. Take-Two Interactive responded to the issue, stating that the game's depiction of the American Mafia was no different from organized crime films such as The Godfather. They also responded to allegations of racism from Unico National, who claimed that the game portrayed Italian Americans unfairly and "indoctrinating" youth into violent stereotypes.

Mafia II formerly held the world record for most profanity used in a video game, particularly with regards to the word fuck, which appears more than 200 times, beating out previous record holder The House of the Dead: Overkill. However, it was beaten in 2013 by Grand Theft Auto V, in which the word fuck is either spoken or read in excess of 1,000 times.
