= Hangar 13 =

American video game developer

- Type: Subsidiary
- Industry: Video games
- Founded: December 4, 2014; 11 years ago
- Founder: Haden Blackman
- Headquarters: Brighton, England
- Number of locations: 3 studios (2026)
- Key people: Nick Baynes (studio head)
- Products: Mafia series (2016–present); TopSpin 2K25 (2024)
- Parent: 2K
- Website: hangar13games.com

Hangar 13 is a video game developer with offices in England and the Czech Republic. 2K established the studio in Novato, California, in December 2014 with Haden Blackman at the helm. It developed its debut game, Mafia III, in collaboration with the series's creator, 2K Czech, which it absorbed in 2017. The Brighton location was opened in 2018. Hangar 13 has since developed Mafia: Definitive Edition, TopSpin 2K25, and Mafia: The Old Country.

== History ==
Hangar 13 was formed around September 2013, when 2K Games announced that Rod Fergusson would be running a new San Francisco studio. However, Fergusson left the position by January 2014, which he claimed was due to "creative differences" with management.

On December 4, 2014, 2K announced that it had set up a new game studio, Hangar 13, led by Haden Blackman, formerly creative director for LucasArts. Blackman told GamesBeat that the studio would work on a game for PlayStation 4, Windows, and Xbox One. Mafia III, the studio's debut title, was announced in August 2015. 2K Czech, the developer of previous entries in the Mafia series, had a supporting role in the game's development. Mafia III was released on October 7, 2016, for PlayStation 4, Windows, and Xbox One. In 2017, 2K Czech was merged into Hangar 13.

In February 2018, 2K announced that Hangar 13 had been hit with sizable layoffs, without disclosing exact numbers. At the time, Hangar 13 was brainstorming ideas for its next game—one idea included a "fight to music" system through which the player's movement would create songs, similar to Harmonix's cancelled game Chroma. In May 2018, Hangar 13 opened an additional studio in Brighton, UK, headed by Nick Baynes. In July 2018, the studio announced that it was working on a new intellectual property.

In March 2019, it was announced that the studio had collaborated with Gearbox Software to develop a free update for Borderlands: The Handsome Collection, which added 4K graphics to the remastered versions of Borderlands 2 and Borderlands: The Pre-Sequel.

In May 2020, 2K and Hangar 13 announced the Mafia: Trilogy. This contained a remake of the first Mafia, a remaster of Mafia II (developed by d3t) and a platinum version of Mafia III comprised with its additional story packs. These editions were available as a bundle or individually. Both the original Mafia II and Mafia III owners on Steam and console had their editions upgraded at no cost.

In November 2021, it was confirmed that Volt, an unannounced game by Hangar 13, was cancelled by Take-Two Interactive after running up a loss of $53 million in production costs. In May 2022, Blackman announced his impending departure from the company, succeeded by Hangar 13 Brighton studio head Nick Baynes. Later that month, after Baynes had taken over, Hangar 13 laid off people across its four studios, of which the Novato headquarters dismissed 50 of its 87 employees. It was reported that Hangar 13 was in the early stages of development for a prequel to the Mafia: Trilogy as well as a new entry to the Top Spin series; Hangar 13 was also awaiting a greenlight from its parent company to begin development on a fifth entry to the Mafia series alongside its prequel, as Baynes describes, to keep its developers employed at the studio for a smooth transition from one game to another. In August 2022, development on a new Mafia game was confirmed to have started.

== Games developed ==
Year	Title	Platform(s)
2016	Mafia III	PlayStation 4, Windows, Xbox One, Stadia
2020	Mafia: Definitive Edition	PlayStation 4, Windows, Xbox One
2024	TopSpin 2K25	PlayStation 4, PlayStation 5, Windows, Xbox One, Xbox Series X/S
2025	Mafia: The Old Country	PlayStation 5, Windows, Xbox Series X/S
