= Mafia II =

2010 action-adventure video game

- Developer: 2K Czech (Note: Definitive Edition remaster was developed by Hangar 13 and D3T.)
- Publisher: 2K
- Producer: Lukáš Kuře
- Designers: Pavel Brzák; Josef Vašek; Jiří Matouš; Jiří Řezáč; Daniel Vávra
- Programmers: Laurent Gorga; Michal Janáček; Dan Doležel
- Artist: Roman Hladík
- Writers: Jack Scalici; Daniel Vávra
- Composers: Matúš Široký; Adam Kuruc
- Series: Mafia
- Platforms: PlayStation 3; Windows; Xbox 360; Mac OS X; PlayStation 4; Xbox One
- Release: 24 August 2010: PS3, Windows, Xbox 360; NA: 24 August 2010; AU: 26 August 2010; EU: 27 August 2010 Mac OS X; WW: 1 December 2011; Definitive Edition; PS4, Windows, Xbox One; WW: 19 May 2020
- Genre: Action-adventure
- Mode: Single-player

Mafia II is a 2010 action-adventure game developed by 2K Czech and published by 2K. It was released on 24 August 2010 for PlayStation 3, Windows, and Xbox 360. The game is a standalone sequel to 2002's Mafia, and the second installment in the Mafia series. Set within the fictional city of Empire Bay from 1945 to 1951, the story follows Vito Scaletta, a young Sicilian-American mobster and war veteran, who becomes caught in a power struggle among the city's Mafia crime families while attempting to pay back his father's debts and secure a better lifestyle.

The game is played from a third-person perspective and its world is navigated on foot or by vehicle. The player character's criminal activities may incite a response from law enforcement agencies, measured by a "wanted" system that governs the aggression of their response. Development began in 2003, soon after the release of the first Mafia game. Upon release, Mafia II received positive reviews, with praise particularly directed at its story, characters, and gameplay; however, the restrictive world design and lack of certain features present in other sandbox games were criticized.

A version of the game including all previously released downloadable content, entitled Mafia II: Director's Cut, was released by Feral Interactive in December 2011. A sequel, Mafia III, developed by 2K Czech's successor Hangar 13, was published in October 2016. To coincide with the remake of the first game of the series, Mafia II: Definitive Edition (a remastered version of the game co-developed by d3t and Hangar 13) was released by 2K on 19 May 2020, to mixed critical reception. This Definitive Edition was later bundled in the Mafia: Trilogy, released on 25 September 2020.

Some characters from Mafia II reappear as young versions of themselves in a prequel game, Mafia: The Old Country, released in August 2025. (Note: Those characters are Leo Galante, Frank Vinci, and Giuseppe Palminteri. This prequel game is set in Sicily in the mid to late 1900s.)

== Gameplay ==
Vito engaging in a gunfight with the authorities. Police awareness in the game works in a similar manner as with the previous game, although the player now has the option to bribe officers after committing an offense.

Mafia II is an action-adventure game set in an open world environment and played from a third-person perspective. Most of the game is set in the fictional city of Empire Bay, based on New York City, Chicago, San Francisco, Los Angeles, Boston, and Detroit, during the mid-1940s and early 1950s. The core gameplay revolves around shooting and driving; a limited melee combat system is also included, which combines punching and dodging. There are 50 era-accurate vehicles in the game as well as licensed music. Depending on the weather during the course of the game, vehicles handle differently. For example, during the early chapters in winter, vehicles are more likely to slip on the road due to the ice. Many firearms from the previous game return, such as the Thompson submachine gun and Colt 1911, as well as a pump-action shotgun. New World War II–era weapons, such as the MG 42 and the Beretta Model 38, also appear in the game.

Interacting with objects in the environment involves two action buttons: a standard action and a "violent" action, used in context-sensitive situations; for example, when stealing a car, the player may choose to either pick its lock or break the window glass. A map is included as in the original Mafia game, but the checkpoint system has been completely overhauled. New controls include a cover system that allows the player to take cover behind objects and shoot enemies, rather than just entering an arbitrary crouch pose behind them as in the first game. This feature provides tactical support against enemies and has become a crucial technique of the genre.

The game's cutscenes are created by the game engine in real-time. For example, if the player is riding in a car and a cutscene starts, the player will be driving the same car with the same condition (damaged or intact) and will be wearing the same clothes. There are exceptions, however, such as the opening sequence and a cutscene in the tenth chapter, which are pre-rendered video clips.

The game features three different in-game radio stations (Empire Central Radio, Empire Classic Radio, and Delta Radio) with licensed music, news, and commercials. The radio stations include music from different genres including rock and roll, big band, rhythm and blues, and doo-wop, with licensed songs by Chuck Berry, The Everly Brothers, Dean Martin, Little Richard, Muddy Waters, Buddy Holly & The Crickets, Bing Crosby, Bill Haley & His Comets, The Chordettes, Ritchie Valens, Bo Diddley, Ricky Nelson, Eddie Cochran, The Champs, The Drifters, The Fleetwoods, Screamin' Jay Hawkins, Nat King Cole, The Chords, and The Andrews Sisters.

== Synopsis ==
Vito driving a Shubert Frigate through the streets of Empire Bay. As in the previous game, a speedometer displayed next to the mini-map shows the player's current driving speed. The player must respect the speed limit to avoid attracting police attention.

=== Setting ===
Set nearly a decade after the first game, Mafia II takes place between two distinct time periods – 1945 and 1951 – within the fictional U.S. city of Empire Bay; the game's first chapter takes place in the fictional town of San Celeste in Sicily, while the sixth is set within a prison located outside Empire Bay. The city is situated on the United States' eastern coastline and divided by a river, and consists of several districts, including wealthy suburbs, slums, and tenement blocks for the city's different ethnic groups, including Irish, African-American, Chinese, and Italian, and large-scale industrial complexes, with the city supported by a large port, a railroad station, a major prison outside its city limits, several parks, and a collection of shopping malls and supermarkets.

The game's main story sees the city divided between a number of criminal outfits, including three mafia families — the Falcone family, Vinci family, and Clemente family — a Chinese Triad outfit, the Irish Mob, and several street gangs. The city's design, including the architectural styles, cultures, public transportation and landmarks, are influenced by various real-life American cities, including New York, Chicago, Los Angeles, San Francisco, Boston, and Detroit, from within the two respective time periods used in the game.

Two of the game's DLC packs, The Betrayal of Jimmy and Jimmy's Vendetta, also take place in the early 1950s, but in a different canon from the base game, while the third, Joe's Adventures, is set during the events of the main storyline, bridging the gap between the two time periods.

=== Plot ===
In 1943, Sicilian immigrant Vito Scaletta is arrested during a robbery and opts to join the United States Army to avoid prison time, being enlisted in the 504th Parachute Infantry Regiment. Vito first experiences the power of the Mafia when an operation in Sicily goes awry, and Don Calò arrives to order the Italian soldiers to stand down.

In February 1945, Vito returns home on leave to Empire Bay, reuniting with his childhood friend and accomplice Joe Barbaro, who has joined Don Alberto Clemente's crime family in Vito's absence. Joe supplies Vito with counterfeit discharge papers and introduces him to some of his contacts for work. Learning that his late father left the family in debt to a loan shark, Vito seeks work with his father's former employer, Derek Pappalardo, who has ties with the Mafia. Later, Vito is introduced by Joe to Henry Tomasino, a Clemente made man. Upon carrying out several jobs with Joe and Henry, Vito secures enough money to pay off his father's debt. However, he is arrested again, this time for the theft and sale of ration stamps, and sentenced to ten years in prison. While serving his time, Vito befriends Leo Galante, the consigliere of Don Frank Vinci. While his sister Francesca visits him, their mother dies and Vito's remaining money was spent on her funeral.

In April 1951, Vito is released early due to his connections with Leo. Reuniting with Joe, Vito meets the Falcone family, led by Don Carlo Falcone and his underboss Eddie Scarpa. Soon, Vito and Joe become made men within Falcone's organization, allowing them to secure a better lifestyle. Learning that Clemente is conducting drug operations against the traditions of the Commission, Carlo orders the pair to assassinate him. Following the hit, Henry approaches Eddie through Vito in search of new employment and is ordered to kill Leo to prove himself. Although Vito manages to warn Leo in time and help him leave the city, Eddie nonetheless brings Henry into Falcone's organization.

Vito's life quickly falls into turmoil after Francesca distances herself from him because of his violent lifestyle and his house is destroyed in an arson attack by the Irish Mob. To rebuild his fortunes, Vito joins Joe and Henry to profit from the sale of heroin bought from the city's Triads. However, Carlo, who is also conducting drug operations behind the Commission's back, learns about this and demands a cut of their profits. Vito and Joe go to meet with Henry to discuss the matter, but witness the Triads publicly murdering him and escaping with their money. The pair retaliate by exchanging gunfire against the Triads at their local restaurant, but fail to retrieve the money. Indebted to loan shark Bruno Levine, whose money they borrowed for the heroin deal, Vito and Joe take on various jobs to raise money, including the assassination of retired mobster Tommy Angelo. Vito visits Derek for work, but discovers Derek ordered his father's death, kills him in retaliation and takes Derek's retirement money. Meanwhile, the Vinci family kidnaps and tortures Joe until Vito saves him.

After paying off the debt to Bruno, revealed to be the same loan shark his father was indebted to, Vito is confronted by Leo, who chides him for his and Joe's actions that have sparked a war between the Mafia and the Triads. Leo also confirms that Henry was indeed a federal informant and that Carlo wants to kill Vito for vouching for him. However, thankful for Vito previously saving his life, Leo arranges for him to be spared by both the Commission and the Triads as long as he kills their common enemy: Carlo. Vito confronts Carlo, who offers to make Joe a caporegime if he kills Vito. Joe refuses and helps Vito kill Carlo. The pair are greeted by Leo, who takes Vito with him to celebrate, while Joe is driven off in a separate car. Vito agitatedly asks where Joe is being taken. Leo reveals that he was not part of their deal, leaving Vito to watch helplessly as his friend is driven to whatever fate awaits him. (Note: Joe's fate is revealed in Mafia III where he now works as a driver for Leo Galante, contrary to what Vito was led to believe after parting ways with him.)

== Development ==
Preliminary work on Mafia II began in 2004; the work on the script began in 2003. Originally intended for a PlayStation 2 and Xbox release, the game was moved to the PlayStation 3 and Xbox 360 in 2005, following difficulties with the developer of the game engine. It was officially revealed in August 2007 at the Leipzig Games Convention. A playable version of the game was achieved in 2007 or 2008. Mafia II was expected to release in late 2009, but was delayed until its release in August 2010.

2K Czech wrote a new engine for the game which was named the Illusion Engine. The new engine was the successor to the IS' LS3D engine which was used to make the first Mafia game.

A promotional trailer was released for the game in August 2007. A second trailer was released on the Spike Video Game Awards show on 14 December 2008. An extended version of the trailer was released on 14 January 2009 with an extra 30 seconds of cut scene footage. The first gameplay footage debuted on GameSpot on 17 April as part of an interview with Mafia II's producer, Denby Grace. The video shows driving and gunplay aspects to gameplay as well as portraying the physics engine. A third trailer was uploaded to the website on 28 May 2009. From 1 June, four short videos were added to the Mafia II website. The first of these is called "The Art of Persuasion" and features the song "Mercy, Mr Percy" by the female singer Varetta Dillard. Another video was released featuring footage from the mission "The Buzzsaw". The video reveals the fate of "The Fat Man" who appeared in the earlier trailers. On 27 March 2010, a new trailer was released showcasing the PhysX-based cloth and physics system used in the game.

On 3 August 2010, Sheridyn Fisher, the face of Playboy Swim 2010, became the official ambassador for Mafia II. Sheridyn's involvement with Mafia II highlights the agreement between 2K Games and Playboy magazine to use 50 of their vintage covers and Centerfolds in Mafia II as part of the in-game collectibles integration. A demo for the game was released on 10 August 2010 on Steam, Xbox Live Marketplace and PlayStation Network.

== Release ==
Mafia II was released on 24 August 2010 in North America, 26 August in Australia, and 27 August internationally.

On 22 August 2015, digital sales of the PC version of Mafia II were suspended on Steam and other digital retailers for unexplained reasons. The game was restored to Steam on 1 June 2016.

=== Pre-order bonuses ===
On 26 May 2010 four content packs were offered as pre-order bonuses in America and European countries, each one available through different retailers. The Vegas Pack containing two additional cars and suits for Vito and the War Hero Pack containing two military-style vehicles and suits was available from GameStop and EBGames. The Renegade Pack containing two sports cars and two jackets was available from Amazon and the Greaser Pack featuring two hot-rods and two suits were available to Best Buy customers. These pre-order packs are available for purchase as game add-ons on the PlayStation Network, Xbox Live and Steam. On 26 May 2010, a collector's edition was announced for Mafia II.

=== PlayStation 3 version ===
The PlayStation 3 version became subject to controversy on 2K's Mafia II forums when 2K's interactive marketing manager Elizabeth Tobey stated that the PlayStation 3 version would be missing certain graphical details that were present in the Windows and Xbox 360 versions including three dimensional grass, pools of blood forming under dead bodies and realistic cloth physics. These details were said to be present in earlier builds of the game, but had to be removed to increase the game's frame rate.

Upon release, the PlayStation 3 version received the same or higher review scores than the Xbox 360 version from Destructoid and Nowgamer (sites that review the game on multiple platforms rather than the normal practice of reviewing a single platform) due to additional content.

=== Downloadable content ===
Three downloadable content (DLC) packs were released for the game:

The Betrayal of Jimmy is the first DLC pack, announced by Sony on 15 June 2010 at E3 2010. It was initially released exclusively to the PlayStation 3 as a free add-on to the base game, before being later ported to the other platforms. Set in a different canon from the base game, the story follows a gun-for-hire named Jimmy, who works for several criminal syndicates to undermine their rivals, until he is eventually set up by his employers and arrested. Missions are structured in a non-linear manner (similarly to the Grand Theft Auto series), and include a score attack feature in which players earn points for doing certain actions; both features would return in the second and third DLC packs. This DLC also contains the exclusive Waybar Hot Rod vehicle.

Jimmy's Vendetta is the second DLC pack for the game. It was released on PlayStation Network, Xbox Live Marketplace, and Steam on 7 September 2010. The story picks up from the events of The Betrayal of Jimmy, as Jimmy escapes from prison and exacts revenge on those who betrayed him. This DLC also contains the exclusive Police Bus vehicle.

Joe's Adventures is the third and final DLC pack for Mafia II, released on 23 November 2010. The story bridges the gap between the two time periods in the base game's story, and features Joe Barbaro as the playable protagonist during Vito's imprisonment. The DLC's plot revolves around Joe's return to Empire Bay in 1950, having been forced to go into hiding for five years because of a hit put on him by the Clemente family. He slowly works his way up the ranks of the Falcone family in hopes they could help him, but soon uncovers a plot to overthrow Don Carlo Falcone, which he must thwart. The DLC combines standard missions with score-based, open world missions. It is estimated to provide eight hours of gameplay. The DLC also contains the exclusive Delizia Grandeamerica vehicle.

=== Alternative editions ===
Mafia II: Collector's Edition is a steelbook which includes 9 items: Made Man Pack (two classic luxury automobiles and two "made man" suits, including a vintage tuxedo), Art Book (photo album-style about the design process of the game), CD of the Orchestral Soundtrack (recorded by the Prague FILMHarmonic Orchestra), and a Map of Empire Bay. Mafia II: Digital Deluxe Edition is effectively the same as the physical edition, inclusive of the Made Man Pack, as well as digitalized versions of the soundtrack, art book and map.

Mafia II: Special Extended Edition is a compilation package published by 1C Company for the Russian market. It includes the base game, the three DLC packs (The Betrayal of Jimmy, Jimmy's Vendetta and Joe's Adventures), and four style packs (Vegas Pack, Renegade Pack, Greaser Pack, and War Hero Pack). It was released on 3 December 2010 for Windows. The same package was released on 1 December 2011 for Western markets as Mafia II: Director's Cut on Windows, OS X and their respective budget labels on consoles. In July 2015, this full edition of the game became unavailable on Steam in Western countries. However, The Made Man Pack, previously only available in the Collector's Edition, later became available as purchasable standalone DLC on Xbox Live.

=== Mobile version ===
A version of Mafia II was developed for mobile phones by Twistbox Games and Oasys Mobile and was published by Connect2Media. Instead of being a direct adaptation of Mafia II, the game bridges the gap between it and its predecessor, taking place largely in 1938. The story centers around Marco Russotto, a soldato in the Salieri crime family and the nephew of the family's gunsmith Vincenzo, who travels to Empire City to find and kill Tommy Angelo, the protagonist of the first Mafia game, for his betrayal of the family. Some characters from Mafia II make appearance, such as Henry Tomasino, Don Falcone, and Don Vinci, although there are differences in their settings. The game features two possible endings.

=== Definitive Edition ===
A remastered version of Mafia II with updated graphics titled Mafia II: Definitive Edition was released on PlayStation 4, Windows, and Xbox One on 19 May 2020. The owners of the original Steam version had their copy of the game updated to Definitive Edition at no additional cost. The Definitive Edition, which includes all of the story expansion and style packs, was developed by Hangar 13 and D3T. The Definitive Edition was later included in the Mafia: Trilogy pack, which was released on 25 September 2020 and also includes a remake of the first game, titled Mafia: Definitive Edition, and a version of Mafia III including all story expansion packs.

== Reception ==
=== Critical response ===
Reception

Aggregate score
Aggregator	Score
Metacritic	PC: 77/100; PS3: 75/100; X360: 74/100 (Definitive Edition); PC: 72/100; PS4: 56/100; XONE: 66/100

Review scores
Publication	Score
1Up.com	B
Edge	6/10
Eurogamer	4/10
Game Informer	9.0/10
GamePro	3.5/5
GameSpot	8.5/10
GamesTM	8/10
GameTrailers	7.7/10
IGN	7.0/10
Official Xbox Magazine (US)	7/10
PC Gamer (UK)	78%
X-Play	4/5

Mafia II received "generally favorable reviews" for the Windows and PlayStation 3 versions, and "mixed or average reviews" for the Xbox 360 version and Definitive Edition remaster from critics, according to review aggregator Metacritic. Greg Miller of IGN gave the game 7/10, calling it "a solid little game that'll give you a fun ride – just don't expect the world." Kevin VanOrd of GameSpot gave it 8.5 and stated: "Mafia II's exciting action and uncompromising mob story make for an impressive and violent adventure." Matt Bertz of Game Informer gave it a 9.0/10, writing that "in an era when video games are moving away from relying on cinematics for storytelling, Mafia II draws on the rich mobster film history to weave a gripping drama about family, friendship, loyalty, betrayal, and pragmatism."

The most negative review came from John Teti of Eurogamer who gave the game a 4/10 and wrote that "Mafia II gets the last word by destroying the myth that the mafia is interesting at all. It contends that the mob world is a hell of boredom populated by aggressively stupid automatons. These drones wake up each morning, carry out a series of repetitious tasks, and return home."

== Controversies ==
=== Removed content ===
There was a significant amount of content removed from the final release of Mafia II. This removed content includes cut storylines, locations, characters, game modes, melee weapons and stores; various players have found leftover remnants for all of these features in the game's files. There was particular controversy caused when a car-destruction mission from the main game, as previewed at Gamescom 2009, was removed from the final release, and ended up re-appearing in the Joe's Adventures DLC, leading fans to wonder if content had been withheld from the game to sell separately.

In November 2021, designer and lead writer Daniel Vávra showcased prototype images from Mafia II which had recently been uploaded to a colleague's online portfolio, explaining that there was going to be a full campaign in Sicily rather than just the one mission. When a fan asked Vávra on Facebook how much content was cut, Vávra replied, "A lot".

=== Reactions from mob victims and civic groups ===
Sonia Alfano, a member of the European Parliament and president of Italy's association for the families of Mafia victims, called for the game to be banned. Alfano's father Beppe was murdered by the Mafia in 1993. Take-Two Interactive quickly responded to the issue, stating that the game's depiction of the American Mafia was no different from organized crime films such as The Godfather. They also responded to allegations of racism from Unico National, who claimed that the game portrayed Italian Americans unfairly and "indoctrinating" youth into violent stereotypes, by pointing out that Mafia is intended for older audiences and is "specifically not targeted toward young people."

== Sequel ==
On 28 July 2015, 2K Games announced the sequel Mafia III. The game, which was released on 7 October 2016, takes place in the city of "New Bordeaux", based on New Orleans, Louisiana, in 1968, seventeen years after the events in Mafia II. The protagonist, Lincoln Clay, is a half Italian, half black orphan and veteran of the Vietnam War, who returns home to find that his former gang and adoptive family is facing problems. The developers stated that they wanted to stray away from the traditional Italian mob characters from the first two Mafia games in this installment, although the game still features an Italian Mafia family that serve as the game's main antagonists. The game features several callbacks to Mafia II, including the return of Vito Scaletta, who plays a supporting role in the game.

At the end of the game, a significantly aged Leo Galante appears and meets with Lincoln Clay. Additionally, someone looking similar to Joe Barbaro is revealed to be alive, and by 1968 works for Leo Galante as a driver and bodyguard.
