= Mafia III =

2016 video game

- Developer: Hangar 13 (Note: Additional work by 2K Czech. PlayStation 4 assistance by Mass Media Games. Ported to macOS by Aspyr.)
- Publisher: 2K
- Director: Haden Blackman
- Producer: Mike Orenich
- Designer: Matthias Worch
- Programmer: Laurent Gorga
- Artist: David Smith
- Writer: William Harms
- Composers: Jim Bonney; Jesse Harlin
- Series: Mafia
- Platforms: PlayStation 4; Windows; Xbox One; macOS; Stadia; PlayStation 5; Xbox Series X/S
- Release: 7 October 2016: PS4, Windows, Xbox One; 7 October 2016; macOS; 11 May 2017; Stadia; 1 October 2021; PS5, Xbox Series X/S; 8 October 2026
- Genre: Action-adventure
- Mode: Single-player

Mafia III is a 2016 action-adventure game developed by Hangar 13 and published by 2K. It was released in October 2016 for PlayStation 4, Windows, and Xbox One, in May 2017 for macOS, and in October 2021 for Google Stadia. It is the sequel to Mafia II and the third installment in the Mafia series. Set within the fictional city of New Bordeaux (based on New Orleans) in 1968, the story follows former criminal and Vietnam veteran Lincoln Clay, who is forced to return to a life of crime to help his adoptive family settle problems with the local branch of the Mafia. After the Mafia betray and murder his family, Lincoln embarks on a quest for revenge while slowly building a criminal empire and seizing power from other criminal organizations in the city.

The development of Mafia III began soon after Mafia II's release, but initially had problems. 2K Czech, the developer of the series' first installments, oversaw restructure, with much of the development team assigned to the company's new studio, Hangar 13. After deciding on recreating New Orleans in 1968, the development team drew influence from the series' previous projects, and designed the game around Lincoln to replicate the core structure of its predecessors. Much of the development work constituted the open world's creation, and several team members conducted field research around Louisiana to capture footage for the design team. The game's soundtrack features several licensed songs composed by various musicians who were active during the time period.

Upon release, the game received a mixed reception, with praise directed at its story, characters, setting, darker themes, and soundtrack. Many also praised the combat and driving. However, some of the gameplay mechanics and the presence of technical issues drew criticism. The game was a commercial success, selling seven million copies worldwide. In May 2020, to coincide with the remake of the first Mafia game, 2K Games released a version of Mafia III comprising all downloadable content packs titled Mafia III: Definitive Edition. This Definitive Edition was later included in the Mafia: Trilogy pack, released in September 2020, and in October 2026, it received native ports for PlayStation 5 and Xbox Series X/S.

The next game in the series, Mafia: The Old Country, was released in 2025.

== Gameplay ==
Protagonist Lincoln Clay engaged in a firefight. The player has access to a wider variety of weapons than in previous games.

Mafia III is an action-adventure game set in an open world environment and played from a third-person perspective, in which the player assumes control of Lincoln Clay, a Vietnam War veteran on a quest to seek revenge for his adopted family, who are murdered by the local mob. The game is set in 1968 New Bordeaux, a re-imagined version of New Orleans, with the game world being larger than the Mafia and Mafia II maps combined. Mafia III's map is made up of ten districts: Bayou Fantom, Delray Hollow, Barclay Mills, Frisco Fields, Pointe Verdun, Tickfaw Harbor, Southdowns, River Row, Downtown, and the French Ward. The player can complete objectives using a variety of approaches. For example, they can use the weapons provided in the game, like shotguns and revolvers, to eliminate enemies, or call for allies, who arrive in a van and assist them.

Alternatively, they can make use of stealth tactics throughout the entire mission without being noticed by enemies. The core gameplay revolves around gunplay. In addition, the player can also perform executing moves and engage in melee-combat. The game features a cover system, allowing them to take cover behind objects to avoid enemy gunfire or detection. The player can interrogate non-playable characters after defeating them in order to gain more information on their objectives, like scaring them while driving a car. The player can attack and overrun locations owned by the Italian mob, and assign one of their lieutenants to operate around the local area. The game allows them to drive cars from the era with realistic driving mechanics and sounds.

== Synopsis ==
=== Setting ===
Set nearly two decades after its predecessor, Mafia III takes place during the late 1960s, within the fictional U.S. city of New Bordeaux. Situated within America's southern states and coastline, the city is composed of island districts, industrial complexes and ports, high-rise offices and apartments, slums, suburban housing, and historical districts, interconnected by railroads and an extensive road network, with a large swampland separating the city from the coast. The city consists of a mixture of cultures including African Americans, Irish, Italians and Haitians, and is mostly controlled by one Mafia crime family – the Marcano family – alongside smaller organizations like the Irish Mob, the Haitian Mob, the Black Mob, and the Southern Union, a group of white supremacists.

The city's design, including its architectural styles, cultures and lifestyles, were influenced by the real-life aspects of the southern United States during the time period, primarily the city of New Orleans. The game's story focuses primarily within this setting, while its downloadable content expands the setting with additional locations around New Bordeaux.

=== Plot ===
In 1968, Vietnam veteran Lincoln Clay returns home to New Bordeaux and reunites with his surrogate father and Black Mob leader Sammy Robinson, his adoptive brother Ellis, and his friend, Father James Ballard. While initially planning to leave for California, Lincoln agrees to stay and help Sammy, who is facing problems from the Haitian Mob and is indebted to mob boss Sal Marcano. Lincoln ends the conflict with the Haitians by killing their supposed leader Baka and meets with Marcano to see how he can cover Sammy's debts. Although Lincoln declines his suggestion to take over the Black Mob from Sammy, Marcano nonetheless recruits him and Ellis to help his son Giorgi rob the city's branch of the Federal Reserve during the local Mardi Gras celebrations. Aided by their friend Danny Burke, whose father is also looking to settle matters with Marcano after a previous falling out, the group carries out the heist with little complications, but the Marcanos turn on them afterward, killing Sammy, Ellis, and Danny before setting Sammy's bar on fire. Lincoln is also shot and left to die but is rescued by Father James.

After recovering, Lincoln contacts his former CIA handler John Donovan, who agrees to help for unknown reasons and assists him by locating three crime bosses who are also seeking revenge against Marcano: Cassandra, the true Haitian leader who is eyeing Delray Hollow, which was taken over by the Dixie Mafia; Danny's father and Irish Mob boss Thomas Burke, whose turf was also given to a rival by Marcano; and exiled Sicilian mafioso Vito Scaletta, who joined Marcano's ranks as part of a deal made with the Commission, but was eventually betrayed and left for dead after Marcano's nephew took over. After reclaiming their respective territories, Lincoln begins violently undoing the Marcano family, taking over their rackets and turf and assigning them to his allies, who slowly come to respect his skill. In the event any are neglected and eventually abandon him, Lincoln must eliminate them.

While dismantling the Marcano family's operations and attacking Marcano's lieutenants, Lincoln learns that Marcano has recently begun building a new casino with the intention of becoming independent of the Commission, and the main intent of the heist was to steal money plates. Lincoln proceeds to attack Marcano's three capos who were tasked with obtaining real estate, counterfeiting money to cover mounting expenses, and getting politicians to legalize gambling. After all three capos are dealt with, Lincoln attacks the casino, killing Marcano's remaining men and Giorgi, before confronting Marcano himself. Accepting his fate, he shares a drink with Lincoln while explaining that, although he does not regret his actions, he had only tried to improve New Bordeaux and get himself and his family out of the life of crime before anything bad happened to them. After killing Marcano or letting him commit suicide, Lincoln leaves the casino and is greeted by Commission consigliere Leo Galante, sent to investigate the attacks against Marcano. Satisfied that Lincoln's vendetta is over, Galante informs him that he can take over the New Bordeaux underworld provided the Commission receives a cut of the profits.

After Lincoln informs Father James and Donovan of Marcano's death, the latter leaves the city and advises him to take over, while the former, appalled with such a concept, reminds Lincoln that his goal was to remove Marcano, not replace him, and implores him to stick with his original plan of getting a job in California. Lincoln's choice at this point determines whether he abandons the criminal lifestyle, subsequently becoming a drifter after arrangements in California fall through, succumbs to its vices and becomes the leader of one of the largest criminal empires in the United States while revitalizing New Bordeaux with his blood money, or is assassinated by Father James with a car bomb after betraying his allies. If Lincoln leaves New Bordeaux behind, whichever of his allies holds the most territory takes over his empire; Cassandra assassinates the governor of Louisana during a short-lived conflict with the government, resulting in New Bordeaux being cut off and subsequently left in ruins after a hurricane devastates it, Burke causes an endless cycle of gang wars to overtake the city following a disastrous conflict with a Cuban rival that ends in his death, and Vito finishes and takes over Marcano's casino for himself, spearheading New Bordeaux's shift into the "Vegas of the South"; he lives to the present day, still presiding over the city he owns.

Regardless of the outcome, Lincoln's actions in New Bordeaux spawn an investigation by the FBI, led by Jonathan Maguire, who is later interviewed for a documentary on Lincoln's life, as is Father James and a few others who knew him. In 1971, Donovan is brought before a Senate committee to explain his role in Lincoln's crimes. The meeting ends with Donovan revealing he had helped Lincoln because he wanted to investigate Marcano's link as one of the conspirators behind John F. Kennedy's assassination. He then shoots Senator Richard Blake, who was named in Marcano's files as a co-conspirator, while promising to track down and kill everyone else responsible for President Kennedy's death.

== Development ==
The game was first rumored in August 2011. In November 2012, 2K Czech, the developer of the original Mafia and Mafia II, announced that the company was working on a "top secret, AAA game". However, the company was later restructured on January 10, 2014, and the main studio in Prague was shuttered, with resources being allocated to a new headquarters in Novato, California. A new studio called Hangar 13 was established by 2K Games in Novato in the same year. Rod Fergusson, who had just left 2K's Irrational Games after completing BioShock Infinite, had originally been in charge of Hangar 13, but later left as a result of creative differences with how he wanted to take the game. Instead, Haden Blackman, who had previously worked with LucasArts, was named as the lead to oversee the project.

Hangar 13 and 2K Games wanted to stay true to the quality that many users expected over the previous games. The game uses the graphics software Simplygon. The game engine used is the Fusion Engine, an updated version of the Illusion Engine used in Mafia II. The development team were interested in creating a world based on New Orleans, and eventually decided on setting the game in 1968. The team used a collection of old photographs to recreate the world. Various alterations to the world were made to suit the narrative. The team intended the world to be accessible for high-speed chases. The team also wanted to move away from the stereotypical Italian mafia scene and represent a different side of gang-related crime scenarios. Another aspect of setting a special tone and atmosphere in the game has been the choice of licensed music. Haden Blackman indicated that Mafia III would include a "ton of great music" from the sixties.

American rapper Ice Cube collaborated with producer DJ Shadow to create the song "Nobody Wants to Die" for the game's promotion.

== Release ==
The game was officially teased by 2K on July 28, 2015, and was formally revealed at Gamescom 2015 with a cinematic trailer. Mafia III was released on October 7, 2016, for PlayStation 4, Windows, and Xbox One. Players who pre-ordered the game received a downloadable content (DLC) pack titled "Family Kick-Back Pack", which introduced several new weapons and vehicles to the game. They can also purchase the Limited Deluxe Edition and the Limited Collector's Edition. The Limited Deluxe Edition's content include the base game and the season pass, while the Limited Collector's Edition added additional content such as the game's original soundtrack and art book.

A mobile game titled Mafia III: Rivals was also released to tie in with the main game, developed by Cat Daddy Games for Android and iOS. Rivals is presented as a role-playing game with turn-based combat mechanics. A free demo of Mafia III was released on March 28, 2017, the same day as the first DLC pack of the game.

=== Downloadable content ===
Following the game's initial release, several pieces of story-based DLC were released. Besides the story and optional side missions, which occur simultaneously with the base game's events, each DLC adds new vehicle upgrades, weapons, and gameplay mechanics which can also be used in the base game. After eliminating the main villain of each DLC, Lincoln will be given additional missions which feature a character he met during the main objective.

- The first DLC, titled Faster, Baby!, was released on March 28, 2017, and added a new location to the game's map, the town of Sinclair Parish, located on the outskirts of New Bordeaux, along with a series of story missions related to it. The DLC's storyline focuses on Lincoln's efforts to help civil rights activist Charles Laveau and his daughter Roxy retrieve incriminating evidence against Sinclair Parish's racist sheriff, Walter Beaumont, who killed Ezekiel Dandridge, Charles's informant, in cold blood and stole all the evidence he had gathered. During the DLC, Lincoln befriends a marijuana farmer named Mitch "MJ" Decosta, whose farm is destroyed; after completion of the main DLC storyline, Lincoln can help MJ rebuild his livelihood by finding marijuana strains, then cultivating and selling the plants in New Bordeaux for profit.
- The second DLC, Stones Unturned, released on May 30, added military-grade weapons and vehicles, and new missions featuring Lincoln and Donovan teaming up to stop former CIA agent and Donovan's nemesis Connor Aldridge, who stole a nuclear bomb in hopes of ending the Vietnam War. Their quest takes them to an unnamed island in the Gulf of Mexico, from where Aldridge and his men plan to contact the North Vietnamese Army in order to sell the warhead, thus tipping the nuclear balance of power. The DLC also adds a new character, Robert Marshall, a retired CIA sniper who turned to bounty hunting, who can be used during the main game or the other two DLCs to take out enemies by vantage point. After completion of the DLC's main storyline, Lincoln can aid Marshall in tracking down wanted fugitives in New Bordeaux by using a non-lethal dart gun.
- The third and final DLC, Sign of the Times, released on July 25, added throwing knives, a bullet time mechanic, and a new storyline, centered on Lincoln's conflict with the Ensanglante, a satanic cult who want to bring about the birth of Pere Sanglant, a demonic entity which they believe will provoke a race war that they will win. With the help of Father James and a former cult member named Anna McGee, Lincoln attempts to put an end to the Ensanglante and their deranged rituals in hopes of achieving closure over his adoptive family's death. Most missions included in this DLC have the player act like a detective, investigating crime scenes for clues to help them progress in the storyline. After completion of the DLC's main storyline, Lincoln can renovate Sammy's destroyed bar with the help of his aunt Lily, gradually restoring it to its former glory.

== Reception ==
Reception

Aggregate score
Aggregator	Score
Metacritic	(PC) 62/100 (PS4) 68/100 (XONE) 67/100

Review scores
Publication	Score
Destructoid	5/10
Electronic Gaming Monthly	6.5/10
Game Informer	6.75/10
GameRevolution	3.5/5
GameSpot	6/10
GamesRadar+	3.5/5
Giant Bomb	4/5
IGN	7.5/10
PC Gamer (US)	54/100
Polygon	6/10

Mafia III received "mixed or average" reviews from critics, according to review aggregator platform Metacritic. Critics praised the story, characters, and darker themes, but criticized the repetitive gameplay and the presence of numerous technical issues.

Alex Donaldson of VG247 gave the game a mixed review, writing, "Mafia III features one of my [favorite] video game stories of the year, some gorgeous presentation, an amazing soundtrack and an interesting world. Sadly it also has by-the-numbers mission design and dubious performance." In his 2/5 star review, Sam White of The Guardian wrote, "To say Mafia III is a disappointment is an understatement. It has all of the surface components to form a great game: the writing and acting are superb, its direction and style are great, but its mechanical underpinnings are archaic and desperately unimaginative."

Marty Sliva of IGN gave the game a score of 7.5 out of 10, summarizing his review with: "Mafia 3's strong characters and confident storytelling kept me engaged, even if the gameplay rarely delivered anything but bog-standard and repetitive open-world action. That's a bummer, because Lincoln is an incredible protagonist and New Bordeaux is a fantastic setting thematically, and it would've been great to see them put to better use." Brian Mazique of Forbes gave the game an 8.1/10, saying, "This might not be everyone's cup of tea, but if you love a good character study and aren't in search of gameplay mechanics that break new ground in innovation and control, this is one you should own."

=== Sales ===
Mafia III was the second best-selling retail game in the UK in its week of release, behind FIFA 17. Mafia III sold 58.7% more than that of Mafia II in the UK. It debuted at number 9 on the Japanese sales charts, with 15,838 copies sold. On November 2, 2016, Take-Two Interactive announced that the game shipped in 4.5 million in it first week, setting a new launch record for 2K Games. On February 7, 2017, Take-Two Interactive announced that the game shipped 5 million copies. By the end of March 2020, the game had sold more than 7 million copies.

On release, it was found that the PC version was locked to 30 FPS; a patch to unlock the 30 FPS cap and address other issues in-game has since been released.

== Legacy ==
In 2017, development at Hangar 13 reportedly split into two groups, one focused on downloadable content for Mafia III, and one building the concepts for Mafia IV. Early ideas set the game in 1970s Las Vegas, with the "glitz and glamour of mob-controlled Sin City." Plans for Mafia IV did not last long as Hangar 13 chose to create their own original video game instead, though Hangar 13 reassured fans that they still owned the series and would not forget about it.

In August 2019, Take-Two Interactive, parent company of 2K and Hangar 13, registered three trademarks in relation to the Mafia franchise. Two of the trademarks were for "Mafia" and their respective text-based logos only differ in typography. The first one was identical to the font used for the first two installments in the franchise. The second one was different and without any description. The third trademark directly mentioned Mafia 2 and featured the same silhouette logo from 2010.

On May 13, 2020, 2K announced the Mafia: Trilogy pack, which includes a remake of the first Mafia game (titled Mafia: Definitive Edition), a remaster of Mafia II, and a version of Mafia III comprising all additional content packs. The collection was released on September 25 for the PlayStation 4, Windows, and Xbox One. The Definitive Editions of Mafia II and III were made available separately on May 19.

In August 2022, Hangar 13 confirmed that a fourth Mafia game was in development. The game, titled Mafia: The Old Country, was officially announced in August 2024, when it was revealed that it would be a prequel to the series, set in Sicily during the 1900s. The game was released on August 8, 2025, for Windows, PlayStation 5, and Xbox Series X/S.

On October 8, 2026, to celebrate the ten year anniversary of the game the day prior, 2K Games and Hangar 13 released native ports of Mafia III: Definitive Edition for the PlayStation 5 and Xbox Series X/S, notably including 60FPS.
