= Sonia Alfano =

Italian politician (born 1971)

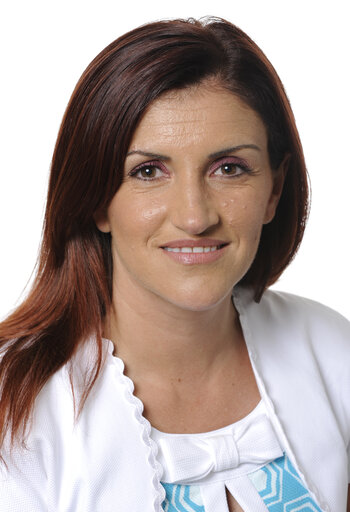

Member of the European Parliament
- In office 1 July 2009 – 1 July 2014
- Constituency: North-West Italy

Personal details
- Born: 15 October 1971 (age 54) Messina, Italy
- Party: IdV (2009–2014); PD (2014–2017); Art1 (2017); Action (2024–2026); CC (since 2026)
- Profession: Politician, civil servant

Sonia Alfano (born 15 October 1971) is an Italian politician. Alfano was a member of the European Parliament from 2009 to 2014 for Italia dei Valori. Since 18 April 2012, Alfano has been president of the Special Anti-Mafia Commission.
