= Top Spin 2 =

2006 video game

- Australian / European cover art featuring Maria Sharapova and Roger Federer
- Developers: Indie Built; Aspyr (PC); Magic Pockets (GBA); MENT (Mobile)
- Publishers: WW: 2K; EU: Aspyr (PC); WW: Superscape (Mobile)
- Platforms: Xbox 360; Game Boy Advance; Nintendo DS; Microsoft Windows; Mobile phones
- Release: March 29, 2006: NA: March 29, 2006; EU: March 31, 2006 (GBA); EU: April 7, 2006 (DS, X360); AU: April 14, 2006 (X360) Mobile April 1, 2006 Windows; EU: December 1, 2006; NA: March 14, 2007
- Genre: Sports
- Modes: Single-player, Multiplayer

Top Spin 2 is a 2006 tennis video game developed by Indie Built, MENT, and Aspyr and originally published by 2K and Superscape. It is the sequel to Top Spin and is followed by Top Spin 3.

== Development ==
The game was showcased at E3 2005.

== Reception ==
Reception

Aggregate score
Aggregator	Score				
Aggregator	DS	GBA	mobile	PC	Xbox 360
Metacritic	51/100	57/100	N/A	70/100	75/100

Review scores
Publication	Score				
Publication	DS	GBA	mobile	PC	Xbox 360
Electronic Gaming Monthly	N/A	N/A	N/A	N/A	8/10
Eurogamer	N/A	N/A	N/A	N/A	7/10
Famitsu	N/A	N/A	N/A	N/A	(360) 28/40; 27/40
Game Informer	N/A	N/A	N/A	N/A	8.5/10
GamePro	N/A	N/A	N/A	N/A	3/5
GameRevolution	N/A	N/A	N/A	N/A	B−
GameSpot	2.9/10	7.2/10	N/A	7.5/10	8.2/10
GameSpy	N/A	N/A	N/A	3/5	3/5
GameTrailers	N/A	N/A	N/A	N/A	8/10
GameZone	N/A	N/A	N/A	5/10	8.4/10
IGN	4/10	6/10	6.5/10	7/10	7.8/10
Nintendo Power	6/10	N/A	N/A	N/A	N/A
Official Xbox Magazine (US)	N/A	N/A	N/A	N/A	8/10
PC Gamer (US)	N/A	N/A	N/A	72%	N/A
The Sydney Morning Herald	N/A	N/A	N/A	N/A	3.5/5

The game received "mixed or average reviews" on all platforms except the Xbox 360 version, which received "generally favorable reviews", according to the review aggregation website Metacritic. In Japan, Famitsu gave it a score of 27 out of 40, while Famitsu Xbox 360 gave it a score of all four sevens for a total of 28 out of 40. Nintendo Power gave the DS version a mixed review, about two months before it was released. Edge gave the Xbox 360 version eight out of ten and said: "Developer PAM has reinvented a game that no longer strives to be a thinking man's alternative to Virtua [Tennis], but something altogether superior". However, Computer Games Magazine gave the same console version three out of five and called it "the most complete tennis experience on any platform to date".
