= TopSpin 2K25 =

- Standard edition cover art featuring Roger Federer and Serena Williams
- Developer: Hangar 13
- Publisher: 2K
- Director: Rémi Ercolani
- Producers: Devin Hitch; Viliam Korbel
- Designer: Beau Barker
- Programmer: Martin Brandstätter
- Artist: Adam Kruták
- Writer: Matthew Aitken
- Composer: BT
- Series: Top Spin
- Platforms: Microsoft Windows; PlayStation 4 PlayStation 5 Xbox One; Xbox Series X/S
- Release: 26 April 2024
- Genre: Sports
- Modes: Single-player, multiplayer

TopSpin 2K25 is a 2024 tennis video game, developed by Hangar 13 and published by 2K. It is part of the Top Spin video game series. The game was released for PlayStation 4, PlayStation 5, Windows, Xbox One, and Xbox Series X/S on 26 April 2024, and is the first installment since the original to not be released on a Nintendo console. It received mixed reviews from critics.

== Development ==
TopSpin 2K25 is developed by the Czech subsidiary of Hangar 13. Electronic musician BT composes the score for the game.

TopSpin 2K25 uses "a proprietary Hangar 13 engine", however exact details about said engine is unclear.

== Roster ==
=== Male players ===
- (Spain) Carlos Alcaraz
- (United Kingdom) Andy Murray
- (Germany) Alexander Zverev (Note: Downloadable content)
- (Italy) Matteo Berrettini
- (Italy) Jannik Sinner
- (Russia) Daniil Medvedev
- (Switzerland) Roger Federer
- (United States) Andre Agassi
- (United States) Taylor Fritz
- (United States) John McEnroe
- (United States) Pete Sampras
- (United States) Ben Shelton
- (United States) Frances Tiafoe

=== Female players ===
- (Canada) Leylah Fernandez
- (Czech Republic) Karolína Plíšková
- (Denmark) Caroline Wozniacki
- (Spain) Paula Badosa
- (France) Caroline Garcia
- (United Kingdom) Emma Raducanu
- (Germany) Steffi Graf
- (Japan) Naomi Osaka
- (Poland) Iga Świątek
- (Russia) Maria Sharapova
- (Switzerland) Belinda Bencic
- (United States) Coco Gauff
- (United States) Madison Keys
- (United States) Sloane Stephens
- (United States) Serena Williams

== Reception ==
Reception

Aggregate score
Aggregator	Score
Metacritic	76/100

Review scores
Publication	Score
Famitsu	32/40
Game Informer	8/10

TopSpin 2K25 received 'mixed or average" reviews from critics for the PC and Xbox Series X/S versions, while the PS5 version received "generally favorable" reviews, according to review aggregator website Metacritic. In Japan, four critics from Famitsu gave the game a total score of 32 out of 40, with each critic awarding the game an 8 out of 10. It was nominated for "Best Sports / Racing Game" at The Game Awards 2024.
