= Mafia: Definitive Edition =

2020 video game

- Developer: Hangar 13 (Note: Original game developed by Illusion Softworks. Additional work done by D3T.)
- Publisher: 2K
- Director: Alex Cox
- Producer: Devin Hitch
- Designer: Ondřej Vévoda
- Programmer: Martin Brandstätter
- Artist: Petr Motejzík
- Writers: Haden Blackman; Will Porter
- Composer: Jesse Harlin
- Series: Mafia
- Platforms: PlayStation 4; PlayStation 5; Windows; Xbox One; Xbox Series X/S
- Release: PS4, Windows, Xbox One; September 25, 2020; PS5, Xbox Series X/S; August 14, 2026
- Genre: Action-adventure
- Mode: Single-player

Mafia: Definitive Edition is a 2020 action-adventure game developed by Hangar 13 and published by 2K. It is a remake of the 2002 video game Mafia and the fourth entry in the series. Like the original game, the remake is set within the fictional city of Lost Heaven, Illinois, during the 1930s, and follows the rise and fall of Tommy Angelo, a Sicilian American cab driver-turned-gangster, within the Salieri crime family.

The game's open world nature allows players to explore Lost Heaven at their leisure when not completing missions to advance the narrative. This is mostly done in the Free Ride game mode, where players are not restricted by the linear nature of missions and can find hidden side missions and collectibles exclusive to this mode. The gameplay builds upon 2016's Mafia III, and features enhanced mission dynamics and the introduction of motorcycles to the series. While some of the veteran Czech Mafia voice cast returned for the remake, the English voices were recast. An original score was also created for the game.

Mafia: Definitive Edition was released for PlayStation 4, Windows, and Xbox One on September 25, 2020, both individually and as part of the Mafia: Trilogy pack, which also includes a remastered version of the second game and a lightly altered port of the third game which includes its additional story packs. It received generally favorable reviews from critics, with praise for revitalizing the story, performances, and graphics. It was released for PlayStation 5 and Xbox Series X/S on August 14, 2026, as part of the Omertà Collection.

== Gameplay ==
Conceived as a full remake of the original, Mafia: Definitive Edition was built from the ground up with new assets and an expanded story, although missions and arcs from the original game are carried over. As with the 2002 game, players control Tommy Angelo throughout the game's single-player campaign, and its world is navigated on foot or by vehicle. New to the remake is the introduction of motorcycles, a first in the series. Mafia: Definitive Edition's gameplay mechanics are based on those of Mafia III. A 'Classic Difficulty' setting is also included, serving as the game's hardest difficulty setting that changes some gameplay mechanics such as ammunition management and police response to crimes, bringing the game closer to the original 2002 game.

Outside the main story mode, a separate Free Ride mode is included "as a nod to the original game", allowing the player to explore the city at their own leisure without any mandatory mission objectives. Unlike the original game, however, Free Ride and Free Ride Extreme are merged into one game mode, with the latter's outlandish and over-the-top side missions incorporated into the main Free Ride segment as hidden secrets to be uncovered by the player.

The game includes collectibles hidden throughout its world in the form of period-accurate magazines and comics, such as Black Mask, Super Science Stories, Dime Detective Magazine, and Terror Tales, along with fictional collectibles based on the Mafia mythos, such as the Gangsters Monthly comic series based on events that take place throughout the game and cigarette cards featuring likenesses of Mafia series characters and their backstories.

A post-launch update released in October 2020 added new activities in the game's Free Ride mode, including taxi missions and a racing mode which takes place in the autodrome featured in the mission "Fair Play". Also included in the update is the ability to play the game in black and white, labeled in the game's settings menu as "Noir Mode" as a homage to film noir movies of the era, as well as various options allowing the player to show or hide parts of the game's HUD.

== Plot ==
In 1938, mobster Thomas "Tommy" Angelo meets police detective John Norman and seeks his help to secure his family's protection from his former associates, the Salieri crime family. To prove that his story is true, Tommy offers to tell Norman what led to his current predicament.

In 1930, Tommy is a taxi driver struggling through the Great Depression. One night, he is strong-armed by two Salieri gangsters—Paulie Lombardo and Sam Trapani—into helping them escape an ambush by the rival Morello family. Tommy is compensated for his help and offered a position in Don Ennio Salieri's organization, which he initially declines. However, after two Morello gangsters track him down and destroy his cab in an act of revenge, Tommy seeks Salieri's protection and exacts retribution upon his attackers with Paulie's help. Tommy subsequently joins the Salieri family as a made man, assisting with running their rackets across Lost Heaven, overseen by Salieri's consigliere Frank Colletti, and befriending Paulie and Sam as they carry out various jobs together.

In 1932, Tommy, enters a relationship with Sarah Marino, the daughter of Salieri's bartender Luigi, after protecting her from a gang of street hoodlums that were sexually harassing her. On Salieri's orders, Tommy and Paulie retaliate against the gang, with Paulie killing their leader, Billy. They later learn that Billy was the son of corrupt city councillor Roberto Ghillotti, who vows revenge. Worse, Billy’s friend Johnny survived the attack. In order to save the family from incarceration, Sam is tasked with killing Johnny at Billy’s funeral. Tommy is ordered to destroy a brothel and kill the manager for switching its loyalties to Morello as a distraction for the authorities. Salieri also has Tommy kill a prostitute named Michelle, who was giving information to Morello’s associates. Tommy ends up sparing Michelle at Sam's request, and later assists him in killing Johnny.

In 1933, Don Marcu Morello ramps up his efforts to dismantle Salieri's organization, gaining support from the corrupt police force and Ghillotti by having Border Patrol ambush Salieri’s bootlegging operation. Salieri later finds that Frank has disappeared with the family's account books, and reluctantly orders Tommy to kill him. Discovering Frank has become disillusioned with the criminal lifestyle and made a deal with the FBI after Morello threatened his family, Tommy allows him to flee the country with his family in exchange for the books, and covers up his actions. Later, Tommy, Paulie, Sam, and another foot soldier, Carlo, help Salieri secure a deal with southern whiskey magnate William Gates, only to be attacked by more of Morello’s men. Gates survives the attack, and Salieri gets possession of the whiskey, saving their fortunes.

By 1935, Salieri and Morello begin moving out into new rackets following the end of prohibition, while Tommy starts a family and is promoted to caporegime for his successes. Learning that Salieri is making friends in the city’s legal system, Morello attempts to have him publicly killed. After Tommy saves him, Salieri realizes Carlo was the one who betrayed them to Morello. Salieri kills Carlo and declares open war on his rival. To weaken Morello’s political connections, Tommy assassinates Ghillotti during the latter’s birthday celebration. Salieri also targets Morello’s young brother Sergio, who has managed to escape every attempted hit on him. Tommy manages to finish off Sergio, allowing Salieri to take control of the dock union. The war eventually comes to an end after Tommy, Paulie, and Sam kill Morello himself as he attempts to flee Lost Heaven on a private plane.

By 1938, the Salieri family is in full control of Lost Heaven's rackets and ruthlessly eliminating anyone who opposes them. Salieri tasks Tommy to assassinate Congressman Hank Turnbull, who intends to remove anyone associated with organized crime. Tommy is successful, but later feels remorseful after finding out from Sarah that Turnbull voted favorably for the Nineteenth Amendment.

When Tommy, Paulie, and Sam agree to recover a stash of diamonds hidden amongst a shipment of impounded cigars, they are shocked to discover heroin instead. Enraged by Salieri's deception and involvement in the drug trade, which he explicitly forbade them to ever engage in, Tommy and Paulie decide to carry out a bank heist that will allow them to retire, without cutting Salieri in. Although the job is a success, Tommy gets concerned for his family’s safety and tells Sarah to take their child and find a place to hide. Tommy later finds Paulie dead in his apartment the following day, and the stolen money is missing. When he meets with Sam to discuss the matter, he learns that Salieri ordered him to kill Tommy and Paulie for going behind his back, and that Frank and Michelle were murdered by Salieri's men after Tommy's past cover-ups were exposed. Tommy survives Sam's ambush and mortally wounds him. Though Sam tries to appeal to Tommy's humanity and offers to help him fake his death in exchange for sparing him, Tommy finishes Sam off to avenge Paulie.

Back in the present, as Tommy finishes relaying his story to Norman, he offers to testify against the Salieri family in exchange for a reduced prison sentence and protection for his family. Norman agrees, being a father himself, and the resulting investigation and mob trials lead to the Salieri family, including the Don, being convicted and sentenced. After serving eight years in prison, Tommy is reunited with his family as they are all placed under witness protection and relocated to Empire Bay. Tommy lives a peaceful life with his family until 1951, when two hitmen (Note: In the remake, the hitmen are explicitly identified and modelled as Mafia II's protagonists, Vito Scaletta and Joe Barbaro.) approach him. Accepting his fate, Tommy is shot and left to die on his front lawn. He succumbs to his wounds, surrounded by his family.

== Development ==
Comparison screenshots of the original Mafia (top) and Mafia: Definitive Edition. While the latter inherited the original story and premise, the remake rebuilt the original's map with new elements, while using the Mafia III engine to account for eighth-generation consoles and contemporary gameplay mechanics.

On May 13, 2020, a remake of Mafia was announced by 2K Games titled Mafia: Definitive Edition, as a part of the Mafia: Trilogy—the other parts being a remaster of Mafia II and a version of Mafia III bundled with its additional story packs. Development was placed in the hands of Hangar 13, who opted to expand on the original story and gameplay, and create a brand new, original score. The game uses the Fusion Engine, the same game engine that was used in Mafia III.

As part of the rebuild, the entire setting of the original game was redesigned. The development team focused on restyling the city to match those of the United States around the 1920s and 1930s following World War I, improving on the atmosphere and aesthetic designs of the city's various districts. One example of this was redesigning the original setting's district of Chinatown to feature more recognizable buildings and decorations. Other improvements focused on modifying the street layouts to coincide with the smoother driving mechanics implemented into the game, including smoother corners and intersections, as well as relocating several buildings and landmarks to new sites and adding in shortcuts and alleys, in order to help with the remaking of the original game's missions—Hangar 13 specifically altered how players traversed between objectives by using specialized data-mapping to view the driving patterns of players in the original game, assessing how to best change this for the remake.

The English language soundtrack for the game was recorded with a different cast, with Italian Australian actor Andrew Bongiorno lending his voice, likeness, and motion capture performance to Tommy Angelo. Hangar 13 president Haden Blackman stated "since our cinematics rely heavily on motion capture data, it was essential that we have both voice and physical performances," and they wanted to ensure that the actors not only "looked the part" but could also perform well on both motion capture and voice-over booths. Conversely, the Czech dub has most of the surviving cast from the 2002 game reprise their roles for the remake, namely Marek Vašut who returned to voice Tommy.

Efforts to prepare the game for release on August 28, 2020, were hampered by the COVID-19 pandemic, which presented several challenges with completion of the game. One problem was completing the main theme of the remake, which was solved by conducting several sessions with their orchestra—each session having a selected group of members to perform their pieces while complying with social distancing protocols—and then mixing all recordings post-production. Overcoming the problems meant that the game's launch date was pushed back towards the end of September.

== Reception ==
Reception

Aggregate scores
Aggregator	Score
Metacritic	PC: 78/100; PS4: 76/100; XONE: 79/100
OpenCritic	81% recommend

Review scores
Publication	Score
Destructoid	9/10
Game Informer	5.5/10
GamePro	89/100
GameRevolution	2.5/4
GameSpot	6/10
Hardcore Gamer	3.5/5
IGN	8/10
VideoGamer.com	7/10

Mafia: Definitive Edition received "generally favorable reviews" from critics, according to review aggregator website Metacritic. Fellow review aggregator OpenCritic assessed that the game received strong approval, being recommended by 81% of critics.

IGN gave the game 8/10, writing: "Completely rebuilt from the ground up, Mafia: Definitive Edition features excellent performances from its new cast, a fantastic driving model, and a beautiful and authentic city oozing with 1930s atmosphere like overfilled cannoli."

GameSpot gave the game a 6/10, praising the story and performances but criticizing the dated combat and movements. Game Informer gave the game a 5.5/10, writing: "Faithful almost to a fault, Hangar 13's remake puts a glossy finish on a title that is fundamentally musty by contemporary standards."

=== Sales ===
In its first week of release the game was the third-best-selling in the UK, with the Mafia Trilogy finishing sixth.
