= Virtua Tennis 3 =

2006 sports video game

- US cover art, featuring Maria Sharapova, Roger Federer, Andy Roddick and Venus Williams
- Developers: Sega AM3 (AC, PS3); Sumo Digital (X360, PC, PSP)
- Publisher: Sega
- Director: Kazuko Noguchi
- Producer: Mie Kumagai
- Designers: Nobuyuki Yamashita; Norio Furuichi
- Programmer: Yoshifumi Ishihata
- Composer: Kentaro Koyama
- Series: Virtua Tennis
- Platforms: Arcade, PlayStation 3, Xbox 360, PlayStation Portable, Microsoft Windows
- Release: Arcade: JP: April 25, 2006; NA: 2006; PlayStation 3, PSP, Windows, Xbox 360: JP: March 8, 2007 (PS3); NA: March 20, 2007; EU: March 23, 2007 (PS3, X360); AU: March 23, 2007 (PS3); NA: March 26, 2007 (PSP); AU: March 29, 2007 (PC, PSP, X360); EU: March 30, 2007 (PC, PSP)
- Genre: Sports game
- Modes: Single-player, multiplayer
- Arcade system: Sega Lindbergh

Virtua Tennis 3, known in Japan as Sega Professional Tennis: Power Smash 3, is the second arcade game sequel to Sega's tennis game franchise, Virtua Tennis. The arcade version of Virtua Tennis 3 is powered by the PC-based Sega Lindbergh arcade system board. Ports for the PC, Xbox 360, PlayStation Portable and PlayStation 3 consoles are also available with a traditional collection of tennis minigames that the home versions of Virtua Tennis are known for. In 2009, Sega updated and re-created Virtua Tennis 3 in Virtua Tennis 2009.

== Console versions ==
Besides having Tournament Mode and Exhibition Mode from the arcade version, the home versions include a World Tour Mode and Court Games mode. These game modes replace the Challenge Mode that was present in the arcade version.

The Xbox 360 version has exclusive Xbox Live online tournaments and modes, whilst the PlayStation 3 version incorporates the option to control the game using the Sixaxis motion-sensitive controller.

Both the 360 and PS3 versions offer native 1080p support.

== Game modes ==
=== World Tour ===
This is the main mode of the game. In this mode, the user creates a tennis player (male or female), and enters the SPT World Tour with a ranking position of 300th, and with the goal of becoming the number 1. The player needs to improve his ranking by winning matches and tournaments, as well as his abilities by successfully completing training minigames and academy exercises. This mode also allows the player to interact with the featured professional tennis players.

=== Tournament ===
This mode is similar to the arcade version of the game. The user can select either a featured professional player or one of his created players (from the World Tour mode), and must win 5 matches in different surfaces and venues to win the tournament. If the player performs well enough and gets a very good rank (A), he is challenged by Duke, one of the game's bosses. However, if the player performs well in the tournament but achieves a mediocre rank (D), he is challenged by King instead.

=== Exhibition ===
This mode allows the user to play single matches with customized options, such as the player, the opponent and the court.

=== Court Games ===
This mode features the minigames from the World Tour mode and is dedicated to multiplayer gaming.

== Game content ==
=== Playable characters ===
Male

- (Switzerland) Roger Federer
- (Spain) Rafael Nadal
- (Argentina) David Nalbandian
- (France) Sébastien Grosjean
- (Spain) Juan Carlos Ferrero
- (Australia) Lleyton Hewitt
- (United States) Andy Roddick
- (United Kingdom) Tim Henman
- (United States) James Blake
- (Croatia) Mario Ančić
- (United States) Taylor Dent
- (France) Gaël Monfils
- (Germany) Tommy Haas

Female

- (Russia) Maria Sharapova
- (United States) Lindsay Davenport
- (Slovakia) Daniela Hantuchová
- (Switzerland) Martina Hingis
- (Czech Republic) Nicole Vaidišová
- (France) Amélie Mauresmo
- (United States) Venus Williams

== Reception ==
Reception

Aggregate score
Aggregator	Score			
Aggregator	PC	PS3	PSP	Xbox 360
Metacritic	78/100	80/100	79/100	80/100

Review scores
Publication	Score			
Publication	PC	PS3	PSP	Xbox 360
4Players	85%	85%	84%	90%
The A.V. Club	N/A	B	N/A	B
Electronic Gaming Monthly	N/A	7.33/10	N/A	7.33/10
Eurogamer	N/A	N/A	N/A	9/10
Famitsu	N/A	28/40	N/A	N/A
Game Informer	N/A	7/10	N/A	7/10
GameSpot	N/A	8.2/10	7.3/10	8.4/10
GameSpy	N/A	4/5	4.5/5	4/5
GameTrailers	N/A	8.4/10	N/A	N/A
IGN	N/A	(AU) 7.9/10 (UK) 7.8/10 (US) 7.3/10	7.8/10	8/10
Official Xbox Magazine (US)	N/A	N/A	N/A	8.5/10
PC Gamer (UK)	83%	N/A	N/A	N/A
Pocket Gamer	N/A	N/A	4.5/5	N/A
PlayStation: The Official Magazine	N/A	8.5/10	N/A	N/A
The Sydney Morning Herald	N/A	4/5	N/A	N/A

The game received "generally favorable reviews" on all platforms according to the review aggregation website Metacritic. In Japan, Famitsu gave the PlayStation 3 version a score of 28 out of 40.

GamePro gave the PS3 and Xbox 360 versions each a score of 4.25 out of 5, with The Watcher calling the former "an outstandingly well-made game. Its technically impressive visuals, easy to learn but hard to master gameplay, and great selection of mini-games makes Virtua Tennis 3 an ace"; and Ouroboros later saying of the latter, "Bloated expectations aside, Virtua Tennis is a fan service treat from the moment you open the box, and setting down the controller without blowing hours on end requires considerable willpower, even if it all comes to feel like just a more refined, balanced version of what we already played to death on the Dreamcast." Edge gave the PS3 version a score of eight out of ten, saying, "This new outing for Sega's ever-appealing sports series is a deeper, more serious and demanding beast than before, yet happily manages to retain the series’ lighthearted atmosphere and is, on occasion, utterly bonkers." Retro Gamer gave the PSP version a score of 80%, saying, "Admittedly, it's still a great game, but when you consider that World Tour can now be purchased for just under a tenner (and an absolute bargain it is too), it's very hard to justify shelling out extra money for a near identical experience."

Gabe Boker of GameZone gave the Xbox 360 version a score of 8.2 out of 10, saying, "It provides solid online multiplayer, a career mode bursting with life, and addictive mini-games fans have come to expect." Ronnie Hobbs gave the PS3 version 7.5 out of 10, calling it "A fast, frantic, and high-octane style of tennis. If this sounds like fun then you will feel right at home. Anyone looking for a more realistic approach will want to find another source." Louis Bedigian gave the PSP version eight out of ten, calling it "a content-filled, mini-game-infused joyride that anyone can love."

In Europe, Virtua Tennis 3 appeared in the national all-format sales charts compiled by Media Control GfK International. For the week ending 1 April 2007, the game ranked fourth in Spain and eighth in Italy. It also ranked tenth in Germany for the week ending 25 March 2007.
