= Butterfleye =

- Type: Subsidiary
- Industry: Security alarm
- Founded: 2013
- Founder: Ben Nader
- Headquarters: San Francisco, California, United States
- Products: Wireless, learning cameras
- Parent: Ooma
- Website: Butterfleye Webpage

Butterfleye was an American maker of security alarm systems. The company is known for its wireless learning camera technology that prevents false alarms. Butterfleye was founded in 2013 by an engineer named Ben Nader, and was headquartered in San Francisco, California.

On December 20, 2017, Butterfleye was acquired by Ooma.

On September 22, 2021, Ooma sent the following message to Butterfleye users: "We're sorry to inform you that the operation, maintenance and support of Ooma Butterfleye and Smart Cam security cameras will be ending. As such, the last day of operation of your camera(s) will be October 22, 2021. After this day, your camera(s) will stop working and will no longer record videos. Any videos you currently access through the Smart Cam App will become unavailable."

== History ==
After losing several bicycles in a series of break-ins at his apartment, Nader—then an engineer at Texas Instruments—tried to install his own security alarm system. Dissatisfied with existing products that took him three days to install, Nader set out to create an alternative. Nader was initially funded by angel investing, raising $1.6 million. In August 2015, he sought backing through the crowdfunding site Indiegogo, setting a goal of $100,000. When the campaign finished in October, the company had raised more than six times its initial goal.

== Cameras ==
Nader described Butterfleye as "Dropcam meets Nest," a combination of streaming cameras and home automation technology. Butterfleye's cameras are wireless with an estimated two-week battery life, allowing them to continue functioning in case of power interruptions.

Butterfleye's cameras are distinguished by their facial recognition technology, which prevents false alarms, and their ability to learn what not to record (for example, footage of the home's residents themselves). The camera also includes iBeacon technology, allowing it recognize certain smartphones, also avoiding false alarms; a thermal imaging sensor; and audio recognition technology, through which the camera can learn to recognize sounds such as children crying or glass breaking.

The system sorts and labels archived footage on the basis of these audio and visual cues. Each camera uploads using AES 128bit encryption, and has 12 hours of internal storage in the event of wireless network or Internet connection failure. Owners can watch the camera feed live or archived through an app on Android (in development) or iOS, and can be notified through the app when a person or pet is detected by a given camera. Owners can also activate a camera remotely, in which case a light on the camera signals to those nearby that it is recording. The cameras also feature two-way audio that allows the owner to speak through the camera to communicate with family members or pets.
