= Virtua Tennis =

- Logo of the first game
- Developers: Sega AM3; Sumo Digital
- Publisher: Sega
- First release: Virtua Tennis; 1999
- Latest release: Virtua Tennis Challenge; 2012

Virtua Tennis (Power Smash in Japan) is a series of tennis simulation video games started in 1999 by Sega AM3. The player competes through tennis tournaments and various arcade modes. While originally released for arcades, all games in the series have been ported to other platforms, including most major consoles.

== Name changes ==
In Japan, the series has always been released as Power Smash, although with the third main entry, the name was expanded to Sega Professional Tennis: Power Smash 3. Even though the Sega Professional Tennis logo and name are prominently featured in all games, they only appear in the original title of the third game (as well as the European title of the second game), with all other entries, released either beforehand or afterwards, simply titled Power Smash.

Internationally, the first game was released as Virtua Tennis, to fall in the same brand as other Sega Sports games such as Virtua Striker. With the sequel, the name was changed to Tennis 2K2 in North America. However, once Sega sold the 2K name to Take-Two Interactive, the next game was released under the original branding as Virtua Tennis 3. All following updates and sequels have been released under the Virtua label.

== History ==
=== Arcade and Dreamcast ===
The original game was developed for the Sega Naomi Arcade Hardware by Sega (in 2000 under the label Hitmaker) and ported to the Sega Dreamcast, Sega's home console based on the Naomi Hardware. The sequel, Virtua Tennis 2, brought several improvements, most notably enhanced graphics, more courts, and a female roster (consisting of nine players), featuring such players as Serena Williams, Lindsay Davenport or Jelena Dokić.

After ceasing development of video game consoles in 2001, Sega announced that they would be making games for all platforms, and made a deal with THQ that allowed them to make original games based on Sega franchises for the Game Boy Advance, one of which was an adaptation of the original Virtua Tennis game.

Virtua Tennis 2 was ported to the PlayStation 2 in 2002. Sumo Digital was tasked with porting the game to the PlayStation Portable, which gave birth to Virtua Tennis: World Tour in 2005, an updated version of Virtua Tennis 2 that expanded the World Tour mode, but featured the smallest character roster in the series.

=== Multiplatform games ===
In 2006, a new entry, Virtua Tennis 3, was released for arcades using the Sega Lindbergh hardware. The game was ported to the PlayStation 3, with SIXAXIS controls incorporated into the gameplay, as well as to the Xbox 360, the latter port also being handled by Sumo Digital. While working on it, Sumo Digital was instructed by Sega to feature Sonic as an unlockable character, giving them the idea to make a tennis game consisting of Sega characters from various franchises. This was released in 2008 as Sega Superstars Tennis, which ran on the Virtua Tennis 3 engine that Sumo Digital developed for the Xbox 360 port of the game.

In 2009, Sumo Digital released an update to Virtua Tennis 3 on PlayStation 3, Xbox 360, Microsoft Windows and Wii called Virtua Tennis 2009.

At Gamescom 2010, Virtua Tennis 4 was revealed for the PlayStation 3, with PlayStation Move controls incorporated. The game also introduced a new first-person perspective to help players control the game more effectively with the Move controller.

Sega released Virtua Tennis Challenge in 2012, the first installment in the series to be released on Android and iOS.

== List of games ==
- Virtua Tennis (1999)
- Virtua Tennis 2 (2001)
- Virtua Tennis: World Tour (2005)
- Virtua Tennis 3 (2007)
- Virtua Tennis 2009 (2009)
- Virtua Tennis 4 (2011)
- Virtua Tennis Challenge (2012)
