= Talkatone =

Mobile app

Talkatone is a mobile application providing free domestic calling and texting, available on both iOS and Android platforms. The app leverages VoIP (Voice over Internet Protocol) technology to enable communication over Wi-Fi and mobile data.

== History ==
Talkatone was co-founded by Danis Dayanov. Initially launched as a client for Google Voice, Talkatone allowed users to access their Google Voice accounts from their mobile devices. Over time, the app evolved to provide users with its own free phone numbers and the ability to make free calls and send texts to most phone number in the United States and Canada.

In May 2014, Talkatone was acquired by Ooma, a company known for its VoIP services and home and office phone solutions.

Talkatone is available in 14 countries outside the US and Canada.

Talkatone is headquartered in Sunnyvale, California.
