= Moshi Monsters: The Movie =

Film by Wip Vernooij

- Theatrical release poster
- Directed by: Wip Vernooij
- Written by: Steve Cleverley; Jocelyn Stevenson
- Based on: Moshi Monsters by Mind Candy
- Produced by: Jocelyn Stevenson; Giles Healy
- Starring: Emma Tate; Tom Clarke Hill; Phillipa Alexander; Keith Wickham; Ashley Slater
- Edited by: Mark Edwards
- Music by: Sanj Sen
- Production companies: Mind Candy; Spider Eye Productions
- Distributed by: Universal Pictures
- Release date: 20 December 2013 (United Kingdom)
- Running time: 81 minutes
- Country: United Kingdom
- Language: English
- Box office: $2.9 million

Moshi Monsters: The Movie is a 2013 British animated musical adventure film directed by Wip Vernooij and co-directed by Morgan Francis. It is based on Moshi Monsters, a massively multiplayer online role-playing game. Its cast features the voices of Emma Tate, Tom Clarke Hill, Phillipa Alexander, Keith Wickham and Ashley Slater. It was released to UK and Irish cinemas on 20 December 2013 and grossed $2.9 million. It follows monsters Katsuma and Poppet, who star in a documentary about their home and are tasked with retrieving a golden egg named the Great Moshling Egg from Dr. Strangeglove and his glumpified sidekick Fishlips.

== Plot ==
Fame-hungry Katsuma is excited to star in Roary Scrawl's documentary about Monstro City. He goes with Poppet and her Moshling pet Mr. Snoodle to meet Roary, and they encounter the other monsters Zommer, Furi, Luvli, and Diavlo. Roary also wants the other monsters to star in the movie, which Katsuma begrudgingly accepts. The group decides to first visit Buster Bumblechops's museum to see the recently discovered Great Moshling Egg.

The evil Dr. Strangeglove and his sidekick Fishlips, having captured many Moshlings to turn into Glumps, steal the egg. When the monsters arrive at the museum, they find a holographic kit left by Dr. Strangeglove, telling them that he will destroy the egg unless they bring him three items by midnight (microwaveable Oobla Doobla, a Blue Jeepers' tears, and Frosted Rainbow Rox, which can be used together to hatch the egg).

The monsters set off on a quest to retrieve the three artifacts and take the egg back from Dr. Strangeglove. They obtain the Oobla Doobla from a group of Woolly Blue Hoodoos after Zommer defeats them in a game of limbo, but the group ends up accidentally leaving him behind. The monsters are then captured by the evil Sweet Tooth; after Diavlo helps them escape, he, Luvli, and Zommer are captured by Dr. Strangeglove.

Katsuma, Poppet, Mr. Snoodle, and Furi obtain tears from a Blue Jeepers at Jollywood during a musical number started by Bobbi SingSong. Bobbi teleports the monsters to Mount Sillimanjaro using a "kerfuffle", but Furi wanders off and gets captured.

While climbing Mount Sillimanjaro, Poppet and Katsuma have an argument and the latter shouts, causing an avalanche. They end up trapped in a cave, where Katsuma tearfully admits that it was his fault. Poppet cheers him up by singing the song "We Can Do It" and they manage to find the Frosted Rainbow Rox. The monsters fight Dr. Strangeglove for the egg at the summit. Strangeglove ends up escaping with the three ingredients and the egg, pushes Mr. Snoodle off the mountain, and captures Katsuma and Poppet.

In Strangeglove's ship, the six monsters are imprisoned and about to be killed while Dr. Strangeglove and Fishlips prepare to hatch the egg into a Glump. Mr. Snoodle, having survived his fall, rescues the monsters. Together, they free the Moshlings that Strangeglove captured and defeat him with their help. The monsters celebrate their victory in Monstro City and return the Great Moshling Egg to the museum just before Mrs. Snoodle hatches from it.

== Cast ==
- Emma Tate as Katsuma and Luvli
- Phillipa Alexander as Poppet
- Ashley Slater as Dr. Strangeglove and Zommer
- Boris Hiestand as Fishlips and Newsreader
- Tom Clarke Hill as Furi and Roary Scrawl
- Keith Wickham as Buster Bumblechops and Diavlo
- Rajesh David as Bobbi SingSong
- Steve Cleverley as Sweet Tooth

== Production ==
The film was produced by Mind Candy and Cornwall-based animation studio Spider Eye Productions. It was financed and produced entirely in the United Kingdom.

The film was dedicated to Andreas von Andrian, who passed away before the film was released.

== Release ==
Although the film did not receive a theatrical release in North America, it was broadcast on Starz in May 2019, and was available on Hulu and Sling TV. It was released for free on YouTube in July 2025 to promote a Kickstarter campaign to relaunch the Moshi Monsters game.

=== Home media ===
Moshi Monsters: The Movie was released on DVD on 14 April 2014 in the UK. It came with either a Jackson or Mrs Snoodle trading card and a Mrs Snoodle code for online and the Moshi Village app.

== Reception ==
Moshi Monsters: The Movie received mainly mixed reviews from critics. On Rotten Tomatoes, it has an approval rating of 60% based on reviews from 10 critics, with an average rating of 4.8/10.

Helen O'Hara of Empire magazine wrote: "For the very young, the surreal, sweet-toothed pleasures will be captivating. For the older audience member, it may be the longest 81 minutes they've ever spent." Tim Robey of The Telegraph gave it 3 out of 5 and wrote: "The film was lulling and sweetly harmless; the franchise's 80 million global subscribers can't all be wrong." Peter Bradshaw of The Guardian wrote that "even fans of the online game Moshi Monsters may find the film version an incredibly annoying and baffling bore." Mark Kermode gave the film 1 out of 5 stars, believing it may entertain very young children, but "will leave adults bored, stupefied, revolted and appalled, but mostly bored".

Guy Lodge of Variety wrote: "Moshi Monsters: The Movie welcomes new converts with an effective combination of seizure-inducing color and insidiously catchy songs." He called the voicework "adequate" and called the songs a welcome distraction.

== See also ==
- List of films based on video games
