= Sumo Digital =

British video game developer

Sumo Digital Ltd.
- Type: Subsidiary
- Industry: Video games
- Predecessor: Infogrames Studios
- Founded: 2003; 23 years ago
- Founders: Carl Cavers; Paul Porter; Darren Mills; James North-Hearn
- Headquarters: Sheffield, England
- Number of employees: ~1,100 (2023)
- Parent: Foundation 9 Entertainment (2007–2014); Sumo Group (2017–present)
- Divisions: Sumo Sheffield; Sumo Nottingham; Sumo Leamington; Sumo Pune; Sumo Bangalore
- Subsidiaries: Lab42; Red Kite Games; Atomhawk
- Website: sumo-digital.com

Sumo Digital Ltd. is a British video game developer based in Sheffield and the principal subsidiary of Sumo Group since 2017. It was founded in 2003 by four former members of the management team of Infogrames Studios.

== History ==
Sumo Digital was founded in 2003 by Carl Cavers, Paul Porter, Darren Mills and James North-Hearn, four members of the former management team of Infogrames Sheffield House, after that company had been closed down. In 2007, Sumo Digital opened a subsidiary studio in India, called Sumo India. In August 2007, Foundation 9 Entertainment announced that it was acquiring Sumo Digital, wherein North-Hearn became the manager of Foundation 9's European operations. North-Hearn subsequently became chief executive officer for Foundation 9 in March 2008. In November 2014, Sumo Digital's officers completed a management buyout from Foundation 9; in this transaction, Sumo Digital's management was backed by NorthEdge Capital and Foundation 9 was advised by GP Bullhound. In January 2016, Sumo Digital opened a third development studio, Sumo Nottingham, in Nottingham, England.

=== Under Sumo Group ===
Parent company Sumo Group was formed in December 2017 and was floated. In January 2018, Sumo Digital acquired CCP Newcastle, the Gateshead-based studio of CCP Games. In August, it acquired the developer the Chinese Room. In February 2019, Sumo Digital acquired work-for-hire video game studio Red Kite Games. A few days later, the studio opened another new studio in Leamington Spa, England, to focus on mobile game development. In October 2019, Sumo North West was opened in Warrington, England; led by Evolution Studios co-founder Scott Kirkland. Lab42 and its 29 employees based in Leamington Spa were added to Sumo Digital's studios when Sumo Group acquired it May 2020. Sumo Digital announced a partnership with the blockchain-company Dapper Labs in October 2020. In February 2021, Sumo Digital acquired Polish video game studio PixelAnt Games.

In October 2024, the company announced its involvement in content updates for Warframe, working in partnership with the game's main studio, Digital Extremes. As of October 2025, Sumo Digital remains involved in developing content for the game, having co-developed all major updates since the start of the partnership.

In February 2025, Sumo Digital abandoned plans to developing its own intellectual property. In July 2025, Sumo Digital sold the Chinese Room in a management buyout, allowing it to regain independence.

== Games ==
=== Developed ===
Year	Title	Platform(s)	Publisher(s)	Ref(s).
2005	Virtua Tennis: World Tour	PlayStation Portable	Sega	
2006	OutRun 2006: Coast 2 Coast	Windows, PlayStation 2, PlayStation Portable, Xbox	Sega	
2006	Go! Sudoku	PlayStation 3, PlayStation Portable	Sony Computer Entertainment	
2006	Race Driver 2006	PlayStation Portable	Codemasters	
2007	Super Rub 'a' Dub	PlayStation 3	Sony Computer Entertainment	
2008	Sega Superstars Tennis	Nintendo DS, PlayStation 2, PlayStation 3, Wii, Xbox 360	Sega	
2008	New International Track & Field	Nintendo DS	Konami	
2008	GTI Club+: Rally Côte d'Azur	PlayStation 3	Konami	
2009	OutRun Online Arcade	PlayStation 3, Xbox 360	Sega	
2009	Virtua Tennis 2009	Windows, PlayStation 3, Wii, Xbox 360	Sega	
2009	Disney's A Christmas Carol	Nintendo DS	Disney Interactive Studios	
2009	F1 2009	PlayStation Portable, Wii	Codemasters	
2010	Sonic & Sega All-Stars Racing	Android, Arcade, BlackBerry, iOS, Windows, Nintendo DS, PlayStation 3, Wii, Xbox 360	Sega	
2010	Doctor Who: The Adventure Games	macOS, Windows	BBC Wales Interactive	
2012	Sonic & All-Stars Racing Transformed	Android, iOS, Windows, Nintendo 3DS, PlayStation 3, PlayStation Vita, Wii U, Xbox 360	Sega	
2013	Moshi Monsters: Katsuma Unleashed	Nintendo 3DS, Nintendo DS	Activision	
2014	LittleBigPlanet 3	PlayStation 3, PlayStation 4	Sony Computer Entertainment	
2014	Scorched: Combat Racing	Android, iOS	Rogue Play	
2017	Snake Pass	Windows, Nintendo Switch, PlayStation 4, Xbox One	Sumo Digital	
2019	Crackdown 3	Windows, Xbox One	Xbox Game Studios	
2019	Team Sonic Racing	Windows, Nintendo Switch, PlayStation 4, Xbox One	Sega	
2020	Spyder	iOS, tvOS	Sumo Digital	
2020	Sackboy: A Big Adventure	PlayStation 4, PlayStation 5, Windows	Sony Interactive Entertainment	
2021	Hood: Outlaws & Legends	Windows, PlayStation 4, PlayStation 5, Xbox One, Xbox Series X/S	Focus Home Interactive	
2023	The Texas Chain Saw Massacre	Windows, PlayStation 4, PlayStation 5, Xbox One, Xbox Series X/S	Gun Interactive	
2024	Stampede: Racing Royale	Windows, Xbox Series X/S	Secret Mode	
2024	DeathSprint 66	Windows	Secret Mode	
2024	Critter Cafe	Windows, Nintendo Switch	Secret Mode	
2026	A Storied Life: Tabitha	Windows, MacOS, Nintendo Switch	Secret Mode	

=== Ported ===
Year	Title	Platform(s)	Publisher(s)	Ref(s).
2004	OutRun 2	Xbox	Sega	
2004	OutRun 2 SP	PlayStation 2	Sega	
2005	TOCA Race Driver 2	PlayStation Portable	Codemasters	
2006	TOCA Race Driver 3 Challenge	PlayStation Portable	Codemasters	
2007	Virtua Tennis 3	Windows, PlayStation 3, PlayStation Portable, Xbox 360	Sega	
2009	Colin McRae: Dirt 2	PlayStation Portable, Wii	Codemasters	
2010	Split/Second: Velocity	PlayStation Portable	Disney Interactive Studios	
2011	Sega Rally Online Arcade	PlayStation 3, Xbox 360	Sega	
2014	Forza Horizon 2	Xbox 360	Microsoft Studios	
2015	Forza Horizon 2 Presents Fast & Furious	Xbox 360	Microsoft Studios	
2018	Payday 2	Nintendo Switch	Starbreeze Studios	
2021	Forza Horizon 5	Windows	Xbox Game Studios	
2026	Fallout 4: Anniversary Edition	Nintendo Switch 2	Bethesda Softworks	

=== Games supported ===
Year	Title	Platform(s)	Publisher(s)	Ref(s).
2004	England International Football	Xbox	Codemasters	
2006	Broken Sword: The Angel of Death	Windows	THQ	
2007	Driver 76	PlayStation Portable	Ubisoft	
2010	Dead Space Ignition	PlayStation 3, Xbox 360	Electronic Arts	
2011	F1 2011	Nintendo 3DS, PlayStation Vita	Codemasters	
2012	Nike+ Kinect Training	Xbox 360	Microsoft Studios	
2013	Xbox Fitness	Xbox One	Microsoft Studios	
2015	Disney Infinity 3.0	Windows, PlayStation 3, PlayStation 4, Xbox 360, Xbox One, Wii U, Android, iOS, Apple TV	Disney Interactive Studios	
2016	Hitman	Windows, PlayStation 4, Xbox One, Linux, MacOS, Stadia	IO Interactive	
2018	Hitman 2	Windows, PlayStation 4, Xbox One, Stadia	IO Interactive	
2020	Hotshot Racing	Windows, Nintendo Switch, PlayStation 4, Xbox One	Curve Digital	
2021	Forza Horizon 4	Windows	Xbox Game Studios	
2021	Forza Horizon 5	Windows, Xbox One, Xbox Series X/S	Xbox Game Studios	
2021	Call of Duty: Vanguard	Windows, PlayStation 4, PlayStation 5, Xbox One, Xbox Series X/S	Activision	
2023	Hogwarts Legacy	Windows, PlayStation 4, PlayStation 5, Xbox One, Xbox Series X/S, Nintendo Switch	Warner Bros. Games	
2024	Suicide Squad: Kill the Justice League	Windows, PlayStation 5, Xbox Series X/S	Warner Bros. Games	
2024–2025	Warframe	Windows, PlayStation 4, PlayStation 5, Xbox One, Xbox Series X/S, Nintendo Switch, Nintendo Switch 2, iOS	Digital Extremes	
2025	Gears of War: Reloaded	Windows, PlayStation 5, Xbox Series X/S	Xbox Game Studios	
2026	Forza Horizon 6	Windows, PlayStation 5, Xbox Series X/S	Xbox Game Studios	

=== Cancelled ===
Year	Title	Platform(s)	Publisher(s)	Ref(s).
2020	Project Nova	Windows	CCP Games	
2021-2023	Just Cause 5	Unknown	Square Enix	
