= Hood: Outlaws & Legends =

2021 video game

- Developer: Sumo Newcastle
- Publisher: Focus Home Interactive
- Director: Andrew Willans
- Engine: Unreal Engine 4
- Platforms: Microsoft Windows; PlayStation 4; PlayStation 5; Xbox One; Xbox Series X/S
- Release: 10 May 2021
- Genre: Action
- Mode: Multiplayer

Hood: Outlaws & Legends was a 2021 action game developed by Sumo Newcastle and published by Focus Home Interactive. The game was released for PlayStation 4, PlayStation 5, Windows, Xbox One, and Xbox Series X and Series S on 10 May 2021. It received mixed reviews from critics. The game was shut down and is no longer accessible as of 18 February 2025.

== Gameplay ==
Hood: Outlaws & Legends is a multiplayer action video game played from a third-person perspective. The player assumes control of an outlaw who must infiltrate a keep of an authoritarian power named the State, and compete against a rival team to steal the treasure hidden in the keep's vault. The player can form a group of four in order to pull off the heist, which has three phases. The first phase requires the player to steal the key from the Sheriff of Nottingham, a boss character in the game. Once the player acquires the key, they are given clues regarding the location of the vault, though the opponent team would also be notified. Stealth is essential, as guards may call for reinforcements and close off certain areas, blocking access to the vault. The opponent team can also observe the behaviors of the AI and pinpoint the location of the opposite team.

Different characters in the game have different weapons and abilities. For instance, Maid Marion is equipped with a crossbow and smoke grenades, while Tooke is equipped with a flail. Players must coordinate with each other in order to succeed. For instance, only Little John has the ability to open locked gates. If the team does not have a tank character, they may need to find other ways to progress. Once a team acquires a treasure, they must locate an extraction point, though it would be heavily guarded by knights and the Sheriff. The location of a vault in a map is randomly decided, and the AI will exhibit different patrol patterns in each playthrough. After each match, the player can access the Scales of Justice, where they will decide the amount of gold they will keep and the amount they will give back to the people. Being generous unlocks more perks and skills, which must then be purchased with gold owned by the player.

== Development and release ==
CCP Newcastle, the developer of Eve Valkyrie, was acquired by Sumo Digital from CCP Games in January 2018 and renamed to Sumo Newcastle. The project was originally an unrealised pitch by Sumo Sheffield. It was initially envisioned as a cooperative game featuring a "dark version of Robin Hood", though it was redesigned as a player-versus-player-versus environment (PvPvE) project due to the team's expertise in competitive multiplayer games. The team was in particular inspired by Hunt: Showdown (2019) by Crytek. The Sheriff was inspired by Tyrant from the Resident Evil games.

Robin of Locksley, and Robin the Earl of Huntingdon, two competing legends, laid the foundation for the game's premise. The team avoided naming the characters in the game as Robin Hood because "[the mystery of] who was behind the hood was far more interesting than defining [it]". The lore for the game's characters, maps and collectables was written by Steven A. McKay, author of the Forest Lord historical fiction series which is based on the Robin Hood legend. The studio deliberately avoided naming any location or set the game in a known period so that the gameplay team will have less restrictions and more creative freedom. The locations in the game were inspired by real world castles such as Dover, Lindisfarne and Bamburgh, though the team also drew inspirations from locations from Game of Thrones, such as Iron Islands and Dragonstone. The buildings and structures in the game were also inspired by Brutalist architecture, which helped reflect the authoritarian and oppressive nature of the State.

Focus Home Interactive announced Hood: Outlaws & Legends in May 2020. The game was released for PlayStation 4, PlayStation 5, Windows, Xbox One, and Xbox Series X/S on 10 May 2021.

In September 2024, it was announced that Hood: Outlaws & Legends would be shutting down and no longer be accessible on 18 February 2025.

== Reception ==
Reception

Aggregate score
Aggregator	Score
Metacritic	PC: 62/100; PS4: 68/100; PS5: 63/100; XSX: 62/100

Review scores
Publication	Score
GameSpot	5/10
IGN	6/10
PC Gamer (US)	68/100
Push Square	7/10
Shacknews	8/10

Hood: Outlaws & Legends received "mixed or average" reviews from critics, according to review aggregator website Metacritic.
