= Moshi Monsters: Katsuma Unleashed =

2013 video game

- North American 3DS cover art
- Developer: Sumo Digital
- Publishers: Activision, Mind Candy
- Producer: Steve Lycett
- Designer: James Clark
- Programmers: Antony Crowther, Adrian Brown, James Sutherland
- Artists: Andrew Hanson, Steve Thomas, Andrew Ritson
- Composers: Orchestral Media, Allister Brimble, Anthony N. Putson
- Platforms: Nintendo DS, Nintendo 3DS
- Release: EU: October 11, 2013; NA: November 5, 2013
- Genre: Platformer
- Mode: Single-player

Moshi Monsters: Katsuma Unleashed is a platform video game for the Nintendo DS and Nintendo 3DS based on Mind Candy's massively multiplayer online game Moshi Monsters. It was released in Europe on October 11, 2013, and in North America on November 5, 2013. It is the third entry in the series of video games published by Activision and Mind Candy.

== Gameplay ==
A level in Moshi Monsters: Katsuma Unleashed.

Moshi Monsters: Katsuma Unleashed is a 2D side-scrolling platformer game, although most of the in-game characters and enemies are 3D polygonal renderings on 2D backgrounds. During gameplay, the player controls a virtual pet called Katsuma through a series of stages across multiple worlds, each filled with enemies, environmental hazards, and helpful items. Katsuma at the start of the game can only run, jump, and spin attack, but as the game progresses, other abilities can be unlocked.

The game has six worlds in total, with each world having extra bonus levels and shortcuts, which cost the main currency you collect in this game to access, which are the gemstones called Rox. Each world is concluded with a boss encounter that require players to identify attack patterns, with each boss having their own glaring weaknesses that can be exploited.

The game also has a separate mini-game portion where other virtual monsters found in Moshi Monsters can use their abilities to complete challenges.

== Plot ==
The protagonist of the game is Katsuma, a monster which resembles a bunny who must rescue his friends and Elder Furi from the evil Dr. Strangeglove and his henchmen, called the Robot Moshlings. Over the course of the game, Katsuma would free his friends and other members of his species called Moshis that were captured by Dr. Strangeglove, and collect pieces of a special item called the World Tablet in order to defeat him. Standing in Katsuma's way are his henchmen, called Sweet Tooth, Scare Force One and Big Chief Tiny Head, which over the course of the game he defeats one by one. After he collects all the pieces of the World Tablet, he defeats Dr. Strangeglove and saves his friends.

== Development ==
Moshi Monsters: Katsuma Unleashed was developed by Sumo Digital and published by Activision and Mind Candy, led by executive producer Steve Lycett and lead designer James Clark, with music composed by Orchestral Media, Allister Brimble, and Anthony N. Putson.

Development was headed by lead programmers Antony Crowther, Adrian Brown, and James Sutherland with the art being led by Andrew Hanson, Steve Thomas, and Andrew Ritson.

== Reception ==
Reception

Review scores
| Publication | Score |
|---|---|
| Nintendo World Report | 8/10 |
| Impulse Gamer | 4.1/5 |

Kimberly Keller of Nintendo World Report described it as “a pretty solid tie-in game,” highlighting its good level design and easy to pick up controls, but would also criticize its uneasy camera movement and lack of challenge. Impulse Gamer would applaud the game for its replay value and music, but would note that it was simple for a side scroller. Dan Bradley of TheHDRoom would mirror a lot of the criticisms that Kimberly Keller had with the camera, alongside the game having issues with the sensitivity of the controls, however Dan would compliment its simplicity for its target demographic.

Kill Screen discussed the game a lot more broadly, but mainly criticized its forgettable and repetitive design, but noted how the game is targeted for a much younger audience.
