= Go! Sudoku =

2006 video game

- Australian / European cover art
- Developer: Sumo Digital
- Publishers: WW: Sony Computer Entertainment; NA: Ubisoft
- Composer: Allister Brimble
- Platforms: PlayStation Portable; PlayStation 3
- Release: PlayStation Portable: EU: 2 December 2005; AU: 8 December 2005; NA: 21 March 2006; JP: 27 April 2006; PlayStation 3: NA: 7 December 2006; JP: 20 December 2006; AU: 23 March 2007; EU: 6 April 2007
- Genre: Puzzle
- Modes: Single-player, multiplayer

Go! Sudoku is a puzzle video game developed by Sumo Digital and published by Sony Computer Entertainment for the PlayStation Portable. Ubisoft released the game in North America. It was released in Japan under the name of Kazuo (カズオ), as Nikoli holds the trademark for Sudoku in the region,

== Features ==
The base game features 1000 Sudoku puzzles grouped by difficulty, as well as various modes, customizable grids and multiplayer. 200 more puzzles are available for download from the Go! Sudoku official website, and players can add their own custom backgrounds to the games.

== Bugs ==
There is a major glitch in the PSP version, in which a mysterious message dialog pops up at semi-regular intervals throughout the game if the console is not plugged in or fully charged. The dialog box covers the entire playing board, interrupting gameplay. There is no way to close the dialog box, though it will vanish on its own usually after about 15 seconds. The bug is even more obtrusive during multiplayer competitive play as it conveys a significant advantage to the player who does not encounter the bug.

== PlayStation 3 edition ==
Go! Sudoku was also released in 2006-2007 on the PlayStation Network (for the PlayStation 3) as an initial Starter Pack with 12 puzzles, with a level pack of more than 1200 puzzles.

== Reception ==
Reception

Aggregate score
| Aggregator | Score | |
| Aggregator | PS3 | PSP |
|---|---|---|
| Metacritic | 63/100 | 63/100 |

Review scores
| Publication | Score | |
| Publication | PS3 | PSP |
|---|---|---|
| Gamekult | N/A | 5/10 |
| GamesMaster | N/A | 48% |
| GameSpot | N/A | 6.6/10 |
| IGN | 7.1/10 | 6.9/10 |
| Jeuxvideo.com | N/A | 14/20 |
| PlayStation Official Magazine – UK | 7/10 | 4/10 |
| Official U.S. PlayStation Magazine | N/A | 2/5 |
| PALGN | N/A | 7/10 |
| PSM3 | 39% | 60% |
| The Sydney Morning Herald | N/A | 3/5 |

The game received "mixed" reviews on both platforms according to the review aggregation website Metacritic.
