= Myfox =

- Industry: Home automation
- Founded: 2005
- Headquarters: Labège, France; Campbell, California, United States
- Area served: United States; Canada; Europe
- Key people: Jean Prunet (Founder); Jean-Marc Prunet (CEO); Scott Ledterman (COO & SVP, Sales & Marketing)
- Products: Myfox Home Alarm; Myfox Security Camera
- Number of employees: 60 (2016)

Myfox is a privately held French company that designs and produces connected, sensor-driven, and wireless home security equipment.

The focus is on home automation products that integrate with category eco-systems (IFTTT, Works with Nest). Myfox's flagship products are the Myfox Home Alarm and the Myfox Security Camera.

The company has its headquarters located in Labège, France, and Campbell, California, in the United States. Its products are available for sale in several European countries, such as France, Germany, Spain, Italy, Sweden, Switzerland, and the United Kingdom. The company launched in North America (United States and Canada) in June 2015.

In 2016, Somfy acquired MyFox.

== History ==
Myfox was founded in 2005 by entrepreneur Jean Prunet, with the creation of the IntelliTAG smart sensor. This technology is based on the concept of “proactive deterrence.” The vibration sensor attaches to doors and windows to alert users in case of an attempted break-in, with the capacity to differentiate between break-in attempts and normal, everyday events. The result is a DYI security solution that can catch intruders before they can enter the home.

The brand launched the first connected alarm solution on the market in 2009. The same year, Jean-Marc Prunet, Jean Prunet's son, took the helm of the company as chief executive officer.

The company grew from its roots in Toulouse, France, to become an international company in 2014. Alongside the launch of the third generation of IntelliTAG, it expanded distribution to Belgium, the Netherlands, Germany, Switzerland and Spain.

In 2015, Myfox launched two new products, the Myfox Home Alarm and Security Camera.

In June 2015, the company entered the North American market.

In September 2015, Myfox announced the Myfox Home Alarm's compatibility with the Nest Learning Thermostat and Nest Protect: Smoke and Carbon Monoxide alarm.

In October 2015, Myfox announced their Security Channel on IFTTT that connects their Home Alarm and Security Camera with software that allowed for interaction between the products, apps and IoT devices. In 2016, the company announced the availability of 24/7 professional monitoring. The company reached an agreement with Apple in February 2016 and is now available for sale at Apple stores in France, Germany, Spain, Italy, the United Kingdom, Sweden and Switzerland, as well as online in over twenty more countries.

== Products ==
=== Myfox Home Alarm ===
Myfox Home Alarm is a DIY security system that works with a Bluetooth key fob to recognize users and automatically disarm the alarm.

The system's IntelliTAG can detect break-in attempts by analyzing and differentiating vibrations and impacts. Myfox Home Alarm also allows the user to invite people from his/her network (friends, neighbors, family) to keep an eye on his/her home through what it calls a “community”.

The system includes an IntelliTAG, a 110 dB siren, a Bluetooth key fob to disarm the alarm, and a Link to ensure Wi-Fi connection.

Myfox Home Alarm is wireless; it connects to Wifi and can be controlled through the Myfox app. When a break-in attempt is detected, a smartphone notification is sent to the user and/or their community, including the option to call a designated emergency contact, which can be local authorities. The application also informs users about who is in the home.

=== Myfox Security Camera ===
Myfox Security Camera is equipped with a motorized shutter to respect users' privacy needs. The camera's integrated infrared detector registers movement and records it while the user is away, but the motorized shutter automatically covers the camera lens for privacy when the user comes home. Additionally, the shutter can also be closed remotely with just a click on the smartphone application.

== See also ==
- Internet of things
- Home automation
