= Virtua Tennis 2 =

2001 sports video game

- European Dreamcast cover art
- Developer: Hitmaker
- Publishers: Sega; Acclaim Entertainment (Europe, PS2)
- Director: Katsumoto Tatsukawa
- Producer: Mie Kumagai
- Designer: Kazuko Noguchi
- Programmer: Mitsuharu Saikawa
- Composer: Chiho Kobayashi
- Series: Virtua Tennis
- Platforms: Arcade; Dreamcast; PlayStation 2
- Release: Arcade; 2001; Dreamcast: NA: October 23, 2001; JP: November 15, 2001; EU: November 23, 2001; PlayStation 2: NA: July 30, 2002; JP: November 7, 2002; EU: November 29, 2002
- Genre: Sports
- Modes: Single-player, multiplayer
- Arcade system: Sega NAOMI

Virtua Tennis 2, known as Tennis 2K2 in North America and Power Smash 2 (パワースマッシュ2, Pawā Sumasshu Tsū) in Japan, is a sequel to Virtua Tennis that was released for the Sega Dreamcast, Sega NAOMI arcade unit and Sony's PlayStation 2 (known as Sega Sports Tennis in North America) in 2001–2002. New features included the ability to slice and play as female players such as Monica Seles, Serena Williams, Venus Williams and Lindsay Davenport and the males such as Patrick Rafter, Magnus Norman, Thomas Enqvist and Carlos Moyá and mixed doubles matches. The game was created and produced by Hitmaker, with Acclaim Entertainment publishing it in Europe for the PS2. This was the last Virtua Tennis game to be released for the Dreamcast following its discontinuation.

== Game modes ==
=== Tournament ===
The player must win 5 matches played on different surfaces and venues to win a tournament. If the player performs well enough, he is challenged by either King or Queen, the game's bosses, depending whether the selected player is male or female.

=== Exhibition ===
This is a single match in which the options are customizable.

=== World Tour ===
This is the main mode of the game. For the first time in the Virtua Tennis series, the World Tour mode features yearly based and calendarized seasons. Users have to play and win tournaments throughout the seasons, as well as to complete training exercises, in order to progress. Also, unlike any other game in the series, the World Tour mode on Virtua Tennis 2 requires the user to play and train both a male and a female players simultaneously, who can also team up to play in mixed doubles tournaments. The user enters with a rank of 300th for both male and female players, which improves as matches and tournaments are won. In addition, the players' abilities can be improved by completing different training exercises. The focus of the training exercises are to be fun, rather than realistic. Each exercise has four levels, with the difficulty increasing progressively. By completing the hardest difficulty with a certain amount of time left or points scored, an outfit is unlocked, which players can wear in all modes.

== Development ==
Virtua Tennis 2 was developed by Sega's Hitmaker studio as a sequel to Virtua Tennis. In a September 2001 interview with Japanese magazine Dorimaga, director Katsumoto Tatsukawa discussed the team's efforts to expand the original game's depth while retaining its accessible gameplay. The sequel introduced eight playable female professional tennis players, allowing women's and mixed-doubles matches. The developers also improved player animations and expanded the variety of shots available to players.

The Dreamcast version expanded the World Tour mode, allowing players to create and develop male and female tennis professionals through training exercises and tournament competition. Players could customise their characters and manage training schedules and stamina while progressing through the international rankings.

== Reception ==
Reception

Aggregate score
Aggregator	Score	
Aggregator	Dreamcast	PS2
Metacritic	90/100	83/100

Review scores
Publication	Score	
Publication	Dreamcast	PS2
AllGame	4.5/5	N/A
Edge	8/10	N/A
Electronic Gaming Monthly	8.17/10 (Note: Three critics of Electronic Gaming Monthly gave the Dreamcast version each a score of 8/10, 9/10, and 7.5/10.)	8.17/10
EP Daily	8/10	N/A
Eurogamer	6/10	9/10
Famitsu	31/40	N/A
Game Informer	9.5/10	9.25/10
GameRevolution	N/A	B+
GameSpot	8.5/10	8.5/10
GameSpy	8.5/10	84%
GameZone	8.5/10	8.8/10
IGN	9.6/10	8.5/10
Official U.S. PlayStation Magazine	N/A	4.5/5

The Dreamcast version received "universal acclaim", while the PlayStation 2 version received "favorable" reviews, according to the review aggregation website Metacritic. In GamePro's January 2002 issue, Four-Eyed Dragon said of the Dreamcast version, "Don't throw out your Dreamcast yet! Tennis 2K2 simply rules by all standards, especially when played with a gang of four competitive friends." (Note: GamePro gave the Dreamcast version two 4.5/5 scores for graphics and control, 3.5/5 for sound, and 5/5 for fun factor.) Nine issues later, however, Air Hendrix said of the PlayStation 2 version, "It's puzzling that this game could look better on the Dreamcast than on the PS2, but it does: Jagged edges, weird shimmering, and poor texture quality make this Tennis 2K2 uglier than its Dreamcast forefather. Even worse, the A.I.-controlled doubles partners make brutally bad mistakes on a regular basis, forcing you to continually scramble to cover their backside." (Note: GamePro gave the PlayStation 2 version 2.5/5 for graphics, 3.5/5 for sound, 5/5 for control, and 4/5 for fun factor.) In Japan, Famitsu gave the former console version a score of 31 out of 40.

Also in Japan, Game Machine listed the arcade version in their December 1, 2001 issue as the seventh-most successful arcade game of the month.

The Dreamcast version was nominated at The Electric Playground's 2001 Blister Awards for "Best Console Sports Game" and "Dreamcast Game of the Year", but lost to Madden NFL 2002, NBA 2K2, and NFL 2K2 (the latter two a tie), respectively.
