= Moshi Monsters =

2008 children's video game

- Logo since 2025
- Developer: Mind Candy
- Type: Massively multiplayer online game
- Launched: Original: 16 April 2008; 18 years ago; Relaunch: 2027; 1 year's time
- Discontinued: 13 December 2019; 6 years ago (original)
- Platform: Web browser (Adobe Flash)
- Status: In development
- Website: www.moshimonsters.com

Moshi Monsters is a British children's web browser massively multiplayer online role-playing game (MMORPG) aimed at children aged 6–12. At its peak, it had over 80 million registered users in 150 territories worldwide. Users could choose from one of six virtual pet monsters (Katsuma, Poppet, Diavlo, Luvli, Furi, and Zommer) they could create, name and nurture. Once their pet had been customized, players could navigate their way around Monstro City, take daily puzzle challenges to earn 'Rox' (a virtual currency), play games, personalize their room and communicate with other users in a safe environment.

The servers for the game were officially closed on 13 December 2019, due to the game requiring Adobe Flash Player, which ended support on 31 December 2020. The characters were reused in Moshi, a sleep app also aimed at children.

In 2025, Mind Candy announced that Moshi Monsters would be relaunched as a PC and mobile game in 2027. In 2026, it was announced that an animated series would be released in 2028.

== History ==
The game was created in late 2007 by Michael Acton Smith, and developed in 2008 by entertainment company Mind Candy and officially launched on 16 April 2008. On 4 December 2009, there were at least 10 million players registered. In March 2010, Mind Candy announced that there were 15 million users and by September 2010, that number had surpassed 25 million. In June 2011, it was announced that there were 50 million users.

The success of Moshi Monsters began to decline in 2015. The peak of Moshi Monsters' popularity was in 2012 at £46.9 million, and it continued to decline. In 2018, total revenues were £5.2 million, compared to £13.2 million in 2014. On 13 November 2019, it was announced that Moshi Monsters would be closing down on 13 December 2019, due to the end of support for Adobe Flash Player.

On June 16, 2025, Mind Candy announced that Moshi Monsters would be relaunched as a pet simulation mobile game, funded by a Kickstarter campaign and scheduled for release in 2027. As of July 27, 2026, the campaign successfully raised £153,891.

== Gameplay ==
The Monsters (in-game pets) keep their own smaller pets, called "Moshlings". They came in a huge variety of themed sets, including Arties, Beasties, Kitties, and Spookies. Those who were not paying members could keep two "Moshlings" in their room, whilst paying members could keep up to six and visit other pets in the zoo.

== Other ==
=== Merchandise ===
Since its digital popularity, Moshi Monsters has grown commercially to include physical products, including games, toys, the Moshi Monsters Magazine (number one selling younger children's magazine in the UK in 2011), a DS video game, a Nintendo 3DS video game, 2 music albums, books, membership cards, bath soap, chocolate advent calendars, trading cards, figures of many Moshlings, mobile games, and critically panned feature film. Eight Moshi Monsters toys were included in McDonald's Happy Meals in the United States and Canada in December 2012. The toys were exclusively available at Toys "R" Us.

=== Nintendo DS games ===
In November 2011, Activision released Moshi Monsters: Moshling Zoo for the Nintendo DS. The game is themed around moshlings and collecting and caring for them. It also came with an unlock code for a secret moshling to adopt in the main online game.

Eleven months later in October 2012, they also released Moshi Monsters: Moshling Theme Park. The game takes place after the events of the previous title, and its plot involves the Monsters going to Moshlings Theme Park so that they can take a break from looking after the Moshling Zoo, only to get their plane hit by thunder and to find out that the park is now abandoned in terrible condition, so they attempt to restore it to its former glory. Like the previous game, it also had a secret moshling unlock code.

Around a year later on October 5, 2013, they would then release Moshi Monsters: Katsuma Unleashed, with a dual release on both the Nintendo DS and Nintendo 3DS. This game would have an entirely different plot focusing on one of the monsters named Katsuma, who has to save his Moshling friends and Elder Furi from the evil Dr. Strangeglove, collecting the pieces of the World Tablet in order to defeat him.

=== Mobile games ===
Mind Candy released Moshi Monsters Village in July 2013 on Google Play, a 3D city-builder published by GREE and developed by Tag Games. After GREE UK shut down, Mind Candy decided to take over the game as the publisher, leaving the development to Tag Games. The game was relaunched on Apple devices on 18 December 2013 immediately ahead of the release of the movie. Following this in December, Mind Candy would publish the companion app Talking Poppet, also developed by Tag Games.

Later in February the next year, Moshi Karts was released on iOS by Mind Candy, which would be followed up in June with the release of Moshling Rescue a "match-three" game based on the Moshling characters was released on iOS and Facebook.

In early 2015, Mind Candy released an action role-playing game called World of Warriors which was shut down in October 2018. In October 2016, Mind Candy released Moshi Monsters Egg Hunt, a game targeted at younger children, along with a companion storybook of the same name.

In December 2017, Mind Candy released Moshi Twilight, a children's app featuring audio-based bedtime stories. The app was later renamed Moshi and expanded to include guided mindfulness meditations. The app was aimed at very young children aged 0-5.

=== Music ===
In March 2012, Mind Candy confirmed a major partnership deal with Sony Music. The deal followed the recent launch of Mind Candy's own music label, Moshi Monsters Music. The deal saw Sony Music handle the distribution aspects of Moshi Monsters' music releases, starting with the debut album Moshi Monsters, Music Rox! Jason Perry, formerly with the UK rock band A and head of Moshi Music, drove the new album. Several songs such as “Moshi Twistmas” and Moptop Tweenybop” can be found in said album. Two albums are available on iTunes and Google Play, as well as on disc. One album contains the songs from Moshi Monsters: The Movie, and another album has some of Moshi Monster's first songs..

=== Film ===
In 2013, Mind Candy announced a Moshi Monsters film. In September 2013, Issue 34 of the Moshi Monsters Magazine included a Moshi Music DVD with a short trailer. On 10 October 2013, a short preview of the trailer was broadcast on ITV Daybreak. Later that day, the trailer was released on MSN. The film was released on 20 December 2013 in the UK and 20 February 2014 in Australia, and was a box-office bomb in both countries. Moshi Monsters: The Movie received mainly negative reviews from critics.

The DVD and Blu-ray were released on 14 April 2014 in the UK and 3 April 2014 in Australia.

== Controversies ==
In October 2011, Ate My Heart Inc, representing the musician Lady Gaga, were granted an interim injunction by the High Court of Justice of England and Wales to stop Mind Candy, the parent company of Moshi Monsters, from releasing music on iTunes by a Moshi Monsters character known as Lady Goo Goo. The songs intended for release included the parody "Peppy-razzi", similar to the Lady Gaga hit "Paparazzi". Justice Vos of the High Court ruled that Lady Goo Goo could appear in the Moshi Monsters game, but that Mind Candy could not release, promote, advertise, sell, distribute, or otherwise make available "any musical work or video that purports to be performed by a character by the name of Lady Goo Goo, or that otherwise uses the name Lady Goo Goo or any variant thereon".

In 2015, both Bin Weevils and Moshi Monsters were told to change the wording of their in-app advertisements by the Advertising Standards Authority, who said that the adverts and phrases such as "The Super Moshis need YOU" pressured users to buy certain items inside the game. Mind Candy said that it took its responsibilities "very seriously with regards to how we communicate with all of our fans, especially children." It went on to say that Mind Candy had "been working with the ASA (Advertising Standards Authority) to ensure that we adhere to best practice and have made changes to the Moshi Monsters game accordingly. We will continue to work with the ASA in any way possible."

== See also ==
- Pokémon
- Tamagotchi
- Digimon
- Giga Pet
- Skannerz
- Neopets
- EvoCreo
