= Super Rub 'a' Dub =

2007 video game

Super Rub a Dub
- Developer: Sumo Digital
- Publisher: Sony Computer Entertainment
- Platform: PlayStation 3
- Release: PAL: 6 April 2007; NA: 3 May 2007
- Genre: Puzzle
- Modes: Single-player, Multiplayer

Super Rub 'a' Dub is a 2007 video game developed by Sumo Digital and published by Sony Computer Entertainment for the PlayStation 3. It was released in Japan under the name Pocha Pocha Ahiru-chan (ぽちゃぽちゃあひるちゃん).

== Gameplay ==
Super Rub 'a' Dub stars the yellow duck from the Ducks demo for the PlayStation 3 that was shown at E3 2005 and 2006. Using the motion-sensing functions of a SIXAXIS or DualShock 3 controller, the player tilts a bathtub filled with water to move a rubber duck around the tub. There are many obstacles to avoid, such as falling out of the tub, and toy sharks which will try to eat the smaller ducks. Online leaderboards track users' fastest times, and allow users to see the replays of those fastest times. The game has three difficulty settings: "Fun", "Tricky", and "Tough". Each of the difficulty settings have 20 levels that the player is required to complete in order to proceed to the next difficulty.

In August 2008, version update 3.00 was released. This update added 9 additional ducks to unlock, monthly leaderboards, and an online store.

== Reception ==
Reception

Aggregate score
Aggregator	Score
Metacritic	49/100

Review scores
Publication	Score
4Players	60%
Eurogamer	6/10
GameSpot	3.7/10
GameZone	7.5/10
IGN	(UK) 3/10 (US) 2.9/10
MeriStation	4/10
PlayStation Official Magazine – UK	4/10
Play	83%
PSM3	50%
VideoGamer.com	8/10

The game received "generally unfavorable reviews" according to the review aggregation website Metacritic. Both IGN and IGN UK gave the game a negative review, and 4Players gave it a mixed review, all while the game was still in development.
