= Virtua Tennis 2009 =

2009 sports video game

- First version of the cover, featuring Rafael Nadal, Andy Murray and Maria Sharapova respectively. The second version of the cover includes Roger Federer, Maria Sharapova and Rafael Nadal. Some covers show Ana Ivanovic replacing Maria Sharapova in the second version.
- Developer: Sumo Digital
- Publisher: Sega
- Series: Virtua Tennis
- Platforms: PlayStation 3, Xbox 360, Microsoft Windows, Wii
- Release: PAL: May 29, 2009; NA: June 9, 2009; EU: June 12, 2009 (Wii); AU: June 19, 2009 (Wii); JP: March 25, 2010 (PS3); Windows: NA: June 9, 2009; PAL: July 3, 2009
- Genre: Sports
- Modes: Single-player, multiplayer

Virtua Tennis 2009, known in Japan as Power Smash: Live Match! (PowerSmash ライブマッチ！, Pawā Sumasshu Raibu Matchi!), is a 2009 video game developed by Sumo Digital and published by Sega. It is part of the Virtua Tennis series, following Virtua Tennis 3.

== Overview ==
Virtua Tennis 2009 includes a World Tour Mode and a fully integrated online ranking system. Brand new create-a-player options give the gamer the ability to create anyone. The game features more than 40 different courts to play on, including locations such as Dubai and Shanghai, etc. Mini-games are back in this iteration, with 12 court games, including new entries: Pot Shot, Pirate Wars, Block Buster, Count Mania, Zoo Feeder, and Shopping Dash.

The Wii version of Virtua Tennis 2009 is the first game released on that platform to support the Wii MotionPlus feature, utilizing it to enable more advanced gestures.

== Features ==
Virtua Tennis 2009 enhances all of the features from VT3 although some are mostly kept the same:

- New create-a-player system is improved and fun to use as giving out the birthday date, a new posture feature to choose player service stances, waiting positions and others. A player may enter the first and last names like the other players; e.g. Lewis Bentley.
- New players such as Ana Ivanovic, Novak Djokovic, Andy Murray and Svetlana Kuznetsova as well as legends like Boris Becker and Tim Henman (Henman is chosen to be the player's coach).
- Enhanced courts and new-operated ball boys and ball girls (a similar feature in Smash Court Tennis 3).
- New environment sounds, crowds, background music and low-pitched grunts.
- Two new camera views with Normal view: Audience view and a Low-view camera, better known as over-the-shoulder camera.
- All new online-ranking system. A player can join and play with friends and in-game opponents to maintain ranking (no online play is available on the PC version).
  - Additionally, there is a revamped offline ranking system including 239 male and 241 female players made by the developers. Some make cameos as opponents, like famous people such as Beverley Turner, and others such as Sumo Digital staff member Steve Lycett. Other people are not famous and made canonically, such as Lian Fournier, Michelle Reveley, Matthew Squires, etc.
- New home-select feature with nationality-detector (the player's nationality depends on their home).
- It has a new weather-system that makes clouds move.
- There is a new generated 3D crowd and people. They move and cheer whenever players give a winning shot and they also make noise whenever the players stumble during long rallies.
- Court Feature: New speed of balls like high and slow balls in clay courts, faster and lower in hard and grass courts.
- Dives from the male players is now replaced by a stumble for less recovery and less chance of noise.
- Smashes from lobs of other players could be now missed more for more realism.
- Service or serves is now sensitive to control especially in Wii for harder control of making MAX serve to make it more realistic.
- Service sometimes goes out, goes wide, etc. to make it more realistic.
- When turning off in-game or match music, it gives the player more concentration and more realistic experience.
- Items are not anymore collected from tournaments and may buy them in the tennis store.
- Tennis Store: Players can use money earned in tournaments to purchase equipment such as racquets and clothing in stores, as well as court passes for use in exhibition mode.
- Tennis stars have more details and their features are more realistic.
- There is a new Main Menu design and changed Character Selection screen.

Virtua Tennis 2009 brought new players to use and play (with 11 male players, 9 female players, and 3 male legends to choose from).

== Game Content ==
=== Playable Characters ===
Male

- (Switzerland) Roger Federer
- (Spain) Rafael Nadal
- (Serbia) Novak Djokovic
- (United Kingdom) Andy Murray
- (United States) Andy Roddick
- (Argentina) David Nalbandian
- (United States) James Blake
- (Spain) David Ferrer
- (Croatia) Mario Ančić
- (Germany) Tommy Haas
- (Spain) Juan Carlos Ferrero
- (Sweden) Stefan Edberg (Unlockable)
- (Germany) Boris Becker (Unlockable)
- (United Kingdom) Tim Henman (Unlockable)

Female

- (United States) Venus Williams
- (Serbia) Ana Ivanovic
- (Russia) Svetlana Kuznetsova
- (France) Amélie Mauresmo
- (Russia) Maria Sharapova
- (Russia) Anna Chakvetadze
- (Slovakia) Daniela Hantuchová
- (Czech Republic) Nicole Vaidišová
- (United States) Lindsay Davenport

== Reception ==
Reception

Aggregate score
Aggregator	Score			
Aggregator	PC	PS3	Wii	Xbox 360
Metacritic	68/100	70/100	73/100	70/100

Review scores
Publication	Score			
Publication	PC	PS3	Wii	Xbox 360
1Up.com	N/A	B−	N/A	B−
Eurogamer	N/A	7/10	7/10	7/10
Famitsu	N/A	28/40	N/A	N/A
Game Informer	N/A	7/10	7/10	7/10
GameSpot	N/A	6/10	6/10	6/10
GameTrailers	N/A	N/A	N/A	7.1/10
GameZone	N/A	N/A	7/10	N/A
IGN	N/A	6/10	7.8/10	6/10
Jeuxvideo.com	13/20	14/20	14/20	14/20
Nintendo Power	N/A	N/A	7/10	N/A
Official Xbox Magazine (UK)	N/A	N/A	N/A	8/10
PC Gamer (UK)	68%	N/A	N/A	N/A
PlayStation: The Official Magazine	N/A	3/5	N/A	N/A
Retro Gamer	N/A	N/A	N/A	75%
Teletext GameCentral	N/A	N/A	7/10	N/A

The game received "average" reviews on all platforms according to the review aggregation website Metacritic. In Japan, Famitsu gave the PlayStation 3 version a score of 28 out of 40.

Eurogamer pointed out that the PlayStation 3 and Xbox 360 versions' online multiplayer had been improved, but otherwise complained about a "general lack of ambition". There were concerns that the competition was too easy, taking as much as 10 hours of gameplay before facing a competent opponent. Even the online action often suffered from lag and jitteriness and players "teleporting" to instantly jump across the screen.

== See also ==
- Grand Slam Tennis, a contemporary tennis video game released exclusively on Wii by Electronic Arts that also supports the Wii MotionPlus
