= World of Warriors =

2014 video game

- Developers: Mind Candy; Saber Interactive (PS4Riley Kinsey
- Publishers: Mind Candy; Sony Interactive Entertainment (PS4)
- Platforms: iOS; Android; PlayStation 4
- Release: iOS, Android; 4 November 2014; PS4; March 21, 2018

World of Warriors is an action role-playing video game developed and published by Mind Candy. It was released for iOS and Android in November 2014. A PlayStation 4 port published by Sony Interactive Entertainment was released on 21 March 2018. The game also spawned two mobile app spinoffs, World of Warriors: Quest and World of Warriors: Duel, both released in 2015. On 10 September 2018, World of Warriors was removed from the iOS and Android appstores, and on 5 October 2018, all online services for the app were discontinued. However, the PlayStation 4 version and the mobile app spinoffs continue to be playable.

== Gameplay ==
Gamezebo places World of Warriors in the collect and battle game genre, while Gematsu calls it a combat-focused adventure game,and IGN Italia places it in the action genre.

The player creates a team of characters which are used to battle enemy non-player characters, in groups of one to three. Each of the characters is based on historical fighters. Defeating enemies rewards the player with experience, in-game money, and material to create other items;the game is free to play with some microtransactions. After some experience, the characters level up, and the player can assign items to each character to make it more powerful. Similar to the classic game "rock, paper, scissors", certain characters are weak to specific other characters, while strong against others. Each character has a unique move. The player can participate in combat by timing their actions to the actions of their characters, which makes their characters' attacks stronger. Each battle takes place in a specific arena, each with its own environment. The game also provides side battles as a method to level up characters outside of the main story mode.

Gamezebo reported at release time that player versus player combat would be added to the game in the future.

== Development and release ==
The development company, Mind Candy, conceived the concept for the game at a company retreat. Art director Johnny Taylor was inspired by his son, who had an appreciation for warriors in history. The game was developed at the Brighton studio.

The game is intended to be a family game, rather than a kids game; Mind Candy founder Michael Smith described the game as having "depth and complexity". During development, he was worried about competition in the mobile video game marketplace. Smith noted that "developers have to be responsible", when designing for kids, as it can be difficult to balance the best interests of kids and families with the desire to make money in a microtransaction economy.

The developer announced the game for both iOS and Android in May 2014, with the expectation of release later in 2014. The Telegraph speculated at that time that "Mind Candy will be hoping that World of Warriors can revive user numbers ahead of a possible Initial Public Offering (IPO) in the next couple of years."

In 2015, two spinoffs were released for iOS and Android: World of Warriors: Quest and World of Warriors: Duel.

On 10 September 2018, the World of Warriors app was removed from the iOS and Android appstores, and on 5 October 2018, all online services for the app were discontinued. The mobile app spinoffs and the PlayStation 4 version of the original World of Warriors were not affected by these events, and continue to be playable.

== Reception ==
Gamezebo praised the unique artwork, the inclusion of historical aspects, and the reflex-based gameplay during battles; however, they criticized the number of currencies (three) and multiple energy systems (two). IGN Italia praised the large selection of heroes to choose from, while lamenting that the game was not optimized for the newest phones, and assigned the game an overall score of 8 out of 10.
