= Ooma =

American publicly traded telecommunications company

Ooma, Inc.
- Type: Public
- Traded as: NYSE: OOMA; Russell 2000 Component
- Industry: Telecommunication services
- Founded: Palo Alto, California, U.S. in 2004; 22 years ago
- Founder: Andrew Frame and Michael Cerda
- Headquarters: 525 Almanor Avenue, Suite 200, Sunnyvale, California
- Key people: Eric B. Stang (President, Chairman, & CEO); Shig Hamamatsu (CFO)
- Products: Voice over IP, Talkatone
- Revenue: ▲US$ 256.9 million (FY JAN 31 2025)
- Operating income: ▼US$ N/A (FY JAN 31 2025)
- Net income: ▼US$ -6.9 million (FY JAN 31 2025)
- Total assets: ▲US$ 149.2 million (FY JAN 31 2025)
- Total equity: ▼US$ 85.3 million (FY JAN 31 2025)
- Number of employees: 510 (FY JAN 31 2025)
- Website: www.ooma.com

Ooma, Inc. is an American publicly traded telecommunications company based in the Silicon Valley, California area. Ooma offers communications services including voice over IP (VoIP) calling for business, home and mobile users.

== History ==
Ooma was founded by Andrew Frame, who previously worked for Cisco Systems, and Michael Cerda. Ooma's initial product was a "VoIP in a box" device that had the capability to use peer-to-peer VoIP technology to let users make phone calls over other Ooma users' landline services. The system worked through a "hub" connected to the main phone line and "scouts" connected to other phones. Due to the potential for privacy issues, Ooma never terminated any calls using the peer-to-peer technology. In January 2008, Ooma officially terminated the option of enabling its peer-to-peer technology.

PC Magazine awarded Ooma the DigitalLife Best of Show award in the hardware innovator category for the Ooma Hub in 2007. Frame stepped down from his role as CEO in 2009 and was replaced by Eric Stang. That same year, Ooma released its Telo system, which consisted of a base system to access unlimited calling and caller ID. In 2009, Ooma received the gold consumer product of the year award as part of the Best in Biz Awards in 2011.

In 2011, it was announced that Ooma's VoIP-In-A-Box was expanding to Canada.

Ooma unveiled its HD2 handset in November 2012. The handset includes one-touch voicemail, an intercom, and baby monitoring features. Ooma also launched Ooma Linx in 2012, which used an AC outlet to connect any phone or fax machine to the Telo base station. In December 2012, Ooma received the Internet Telephony Product of the Year award for developing the Telo, HD2 handset, and Linx. Ooma launched the HD3 handset in December 2017 and the Ooma Telo 4G system with wireless internet connectivity in January 2019.

Ooma worked with West Valley City, Utah, in June 2014 to offer free telephone service to households through a fiber network. In 2015, Ooma was named one of the fastest-growing private companies by the San Francisco Business Times and Silicon Valley Business Journal. That same year, it was a gold winner of the Best of Biz Awards.

Ooma acquired security camera startup Butterfleye in December 2017, custom business communications provider Voxter in March 2018, business communications provider Broadsmart in May 2019 and business communications provider OnSIP in July 2022. On September 22, 2021, Ooma announced in an email message to its camera users that "We're sorry to inform you that the operation, maintenance and support of Ooma Butterfleye and Smart Cam security cameras will be ending. As such, the last day of operation of your camera(s) will be October 22, 2021. After this day, your camera(s) will stop working and will no longer record videos. Any videos you currently access through the Smart Cam App will become unavailable."

Ooma acquired telecommunications platform provider 2600Hz (www.2600hz.com) in October 2023.

== Funding ==
The company's initial funding round raised $7.8 million in 2005. In 2006, Sean Parker invested in the company. Ooma held a Series B funding round in 2007, which raised $12 million. Investors included Worldview Technology Partners and Draper Fisher Jurvetson. In September 2008, Ooma raised $16 million in its Series C funding round.

Ooma raised a $18.3 million Series D funding round in June 2009. Worldview Technology Partners led the round.

In January 2012, Ooma raised a funding round of $17.3 million from investors, including Draper Fisher Jurvetson and Founder's Fund. The company had raised a total of $83.3 million at that time.

Ooma held its IPO in July 2015. The company went public at $13 per share. Ooma raised $85 million from the 5 million shares offered.

== Operations ==
Ooma's service offerings are broken down into two business models: Ooma Telo for personal or home use and business services including Ooma Office, Ooma Office Pro, and Ooma Enterprise.

=== Ooma Telo ===
Ooma Telo was released on October 1, 2009. Telo is designed to provide unlimited, free VoIP calls within the United States. It features Bluetooth integration, HD voice, and a cordless DECT 6.0 handset. Existing landline, VoIP, or mobile numbers can be ported to Ooma.

A Premier package adds Multi-Ring, Do Not Disturb, enhanced voicemail service, and Caller ID with Name.

=== Ooma Office ===
Launched in 2013, Ooma Office consists of a cloud-based phone system including business applications such as conferencing, virtual fax extensions, and extension dialing. In August 2016, the mobile version of Ooma Office was released. The mobile version does not require the base station unit Ooma Office operates through. Features available through the mobile software include a virtual receptionist, call transferring, local and toll-free numbers, conference bridges, and extension dialing.

In 2020, Ooma introduced Ooma Connect, a base station and adapter that provides a wireless internet connection.

=== Ooma Office Pro ===
Launched in 2020, Ooma Office Pro provides all the features of Ooma Office in addition to advanced features including video meetings, call recording, a desktop app (also known as a softphone), robocall blocking, and voicemail transcription.

=== Ooma Office Pro Plus ===
Launched in 2022, Ooma Office Pro Plus provides additional features to the Pro tier including: Call Queuing, Hot Desking, Salesforce and Dynamics CRM integrations, Ooma Meetings Recordings, Shared Voicemail Boxes, Expanded Schedules, Call Screening, Digital Call Deflection, and automated texting.

=== Ooma Enterprise ===
Launched in 2018, Ooma Enterprise provides a full, customizable unified communications as a service (UCaaS) solution.

=== Ooma AirDial ===
Ooma introduced Ooma AirDial in November 2021 to provide replacement for traditional analog copper-wire phone lines, also known as Plain Old Telephone Service or POTS, for devices that require a highly reliable connection, such as fire alarm panels, elevator emergency phones, burglar alarms, building entry system and blue-light campus safety phone.
