= EvoCreo =

2015 video game

- Publisher: Ilmfinity Studios LLC
- Director: Ebrahim Behbahani
- Producer: Ebrahim Behbahani
- Writers: Kazem Behbahani; Shahrezad Behbahani
- Composer: David Orr
- Release: April 29, 2015; July 8, 2015 (Google Play)
- Genre: Role-playing video game

EvoCreo is a role-playing video game set in the world of Zenith, where players capture, train, and battle monsters called Creos. It was released on Ouya and iOS, and January 7, 2026 on Steam.

== Gameplay ==
Set in the world of Zenith, EvoCreo is an RPG game where players train creatures known as Creos. Then, Creo Evokers send out their Creo into battle against their opponents; wild Creo or other trainers. Creo have multiple evolutionary paths that they can evolve into. Game mechanics that require managing include move cooldowns, status effects, and passive traits. There are three categories of moves: Normal, Elite, and Healing moves. Elite moves are powerful attack that take a significantly longer time to charge up compared to Normal moves. Healing moves restore the health of a Creo during battle. Each Creo has room for 1 Elite move, 3 Normal moves, and 1 Healing move respectively.

== Development ==
Developer Ilmfinity is based in the United States. EvoCreo began as an idea in lead designer Ebrahim Behbahani's head in 2011. The soundtrack was composed by David Orr, the same man behind Castle Crashers.

== Release ==
EvoCreo released for Steam on January 7, 2026 alongside a demo, with the in-game shop removed and including certain DLC and premium items. Online PvP was also announced for after release.

== Reception ==
EvoCreo elicited comparisons to Pokémon, but TouchArcade found that it was more than a replica. ComicBook.com enjoyed the in-depth battle system, but was dissuaded by the status of its move from mobile to PC. Screen Rant recognized its derivativity, but wrote that there were multiple elements that EvoCreo differed with, placing multiple evolutionary paths as an example. In January 22, 2026, user reviews for EvoCreo on Steam were "Mixed", but leaned closer to positive than negative according to author Austin King.

== Sequel ==
EvoCreo 2 first opened pre-registration sign-ups in 2025. Set in the land of Shoru as a fresh recruit in the Shoru Police Academy, EvoCreo 2 notably has no level cap for Creo. The announcement trailer already received 6,000 views in one day after it was uploaded. In a review, Pocket Gamer complimented the combat as being in-depth, appreciated the open world, and noted the vast amount of Creo to catch.

== See also ==
- Pokémon
- Tamagotchi
- Digimon
- Giga Pet
- Skannerz
- Neopets
- Moshi Monsters
