= Xbox Fitness =

Xbox One console service

- Developer: Sumo Digital
- Type: Fitness
- Launched: WW: November 22, 2013
- Discontinued: July 1, 2017; 9 years ago
- Platform: Xbox One
- Status: Closed on July 1, 2017

Xbox Fitness was a service for the Xbox One console, developed by Microsoft Studios in partnership with Sumo Digital, which featured fitness and exercise videos from trainers Jillian Michaels, Tracy Anderson, Tony Horton of P90X and Shaun T of Insanity. Xbox Fitness was one of the 22 game titles that launched with Xbox One. The game used the Kinect sensor to track the player's heart rate and estimated calories burned, and gave feedback about how well the player is performing the exercise activities.

The service used the Kinect 2.0 sensor to track the player's heart rate, estimate calories burned, and to provide feedback in form, balance, and power. Using Kinect technology, Xbox Fitness would read the player's heart rate without a monitor and see which muscles are most engaged by measuring the power, force, and transfer of weight in the body. It could also track balance, tempo, and form of the player's body. Xbox Fitness included workout routines that ranged from 10 minutes to 60 minutes and the service was free through December 2014 for Xbox Live Gold subscribers.

To motivate the player, in-workout challenges were presented and achievements could be earned. When the player is completing a workout, the silhouette of the body will appear on the right side of the screen with colors and movement to showcase which muscles are engaged and how hard each is working. Players will see how their Fit Points and scores compare to their past efforts, their friends, and the Xbox Live community. Xbox Fitness could also synchronise data with the Microsoft Health platform.

On June 27, 2016, Microsoft announced the discontinuation of Xbox Fitness; the ability to purchase content was removed effective immediately, and the service was disabled entirely on July 1, 2017, after which users were no longer be able to use Xbox Fitness or access its content. No refunds were provided for purchased content.

== See also ==
- MSN Health & Fitness
- Microsoft HealthVault
