= Virtua Tennis: World Tour =

2005 video game

- European cover art which includes Tim Henman, Andy Roddick, Roger Federer and Maria Sharapova
- Developer: Sumo Digital
- Publisher: Sega
- Series: Virtua Tennis
- Platform: PlayStation Portable
- Release: PAL: September 1, 2005; NA: October 4, 2005; JP: January 26, 2006
- Genre: Sports
- Mode: Single-player

Virtua Tennis: World Tour, known in Japan as Power Smash: New Generation, is a tennis video game which was released for the Sony PlayStation Portable.

== Overview ==
Virtua Tennis: World Tour was first released on September 1, 2005 in Europe with a North American release following shortly afterwards on October 6. It was later released in Japan on January 26, 2006 under the title Power Smash: New Generation.

The game features 14 real-life professional tennis players, four court surfaces (with multiple arenas of each surface) and multiple game modes.

== Game modes ==
=== World Tour ===
This is the main 1-player mode of Virtua Tennis: World Tour. In this mode, the players create one male and one female character for use in all tournaments in the game to become the No. #1-ranked player in the world. In between tournaments, skill levels may be raised by competing in a variety of quick minigames.

=== Quick Match ===
As it sounds, Quick Match just throws into a match, automatically selecting the players and court.

=== Ball Games ===
A few minigames for a short play time. These are Blocker, Balloon Smash, Fruit Dash and Blockbuster.

=== Tournament ===
The players select a player and attempt to play through 6 matches in order to win a tournament. Courts are automatically selected. There is also a retry option which enables the player to try to win again and again.

=== Exhibition ===
The player selects a player, opponent and a court.

=== Multiplayer ===
Using the PSP's Wi-Fi capabilities, up to 4 players can compete in a tennis match.

== Reception ==
Reception

Aggregate score
Aggregator	Score
Metacritic	84/100

Review scores
Publication	Score
Computer Games Magazine	4.5/5
Edge	7/10
Electronic Gaming Monthly	7.33/10 (Note: In Electronic Gaming Monthly's review of the game, one critic gave it 6/10, and the rest gave it each a score of 8/10.)
Eurogamer	9/10
Famitsu	27/40
Game Informer	8.5/10
GamePro	4/5
GameSpot	8.2/10
GameSpy	4/5
Hardcore Gamer	3.75/5
IGN	8.5/10
Official U.S. PlayStation Magazine	4/5
Pocket Gamer	3.5/5
Retro Gamer	91%
Maxim	4/5
The Sydney Morning Herald	4/5

The game received "favorable" reviews according to the review aggregation website Metacritic. Many critics were disappointed, however, by the added element of two fictional female players, on the account of the high numbers of top players in the WTA. In Japan, Famitsu gave it a score of three sevens and one six for a total of 27 out of 40.
