= A Storied Life: Tabitha =

- Developer: Lab42
- Publisher: Secret Mode
- Release: WW: April 14, 2026
- Genre: Puzzle
- Mode: Single-player

A Storied Life: Tabitha is a 2026 puzzle video game developed by Lab42 and published by Secret Mode. The game was released for PC, MacOS, and Nintendo Switch on April 14, 2026. Set in North Yorkshire, the game follows the unnamed beneficiary of a recently deceased woman named Tabitha, who must clear her country home and reconstruct her damaged memoirs from the possessions she left behind.

The gameplay combines object-sorting and packing puzzles with a branching narrative system. Players search Tabitha's home for belongings and decide whether to keep, auction, or discard them, while accounting for the capacity and weight limits of packing boxes. Retained objects provide words that can be inserted into gaps in Tabitha's memoirs, allowing the player’s choices to shape how her life is recorded, leading to multiple possible endings. Reviews praised the game's hand-painted visual style and central premise, but critics were divided over the effectiveness and coherence of its storytelling.

== Gameplay ==
A Storied Life: Tabitha is a single-player narrative puzzle game in which the player clears the country home of a recently deceased woman named Tabitha. Each level depicts a room in the house from an isometric perspective. The player searches the room by looking through different parts of Tabitha's house. After finding an object, the player chooses whether to save an item, sell it, or discard it. Objects selected for retention must be arranged inside a packing box. Players must also account for the combined weight and fragility of the packed objects, but packing materials found in the house alter these restrictions, like using bubble wrap to protect fragile objects.

The objects retained by the player are used to reconstruct sections of Tabitha's memoir, creating a narrative about her life. Each retained object unlocks a selection of associated words, which the player inserts into blank spaces in the manuscript at the end of a chapter. The available words depend on the objects that the player packed, and the completed passages may portray vastly different accounts of Tabitha's life. The gameplay was described by several critics as a reverse version of Unpacking.

== Development ==
Developer Lab42 is based in Leamington Spa, England. The concept for A Storied Life: Tabitha originated with Lab42 writer Cherish Goldstraw, who initially conceptualized a linear point-and-click game that merged with ideas from a hidden object game about a young person sorting through their deceased grandmother's belongings. The developers decided to use the limited space of the packing box to create a puzzle mechanic for the game. The goal of the design team was to create a "crafty" art style for the game, which involved watercolor-type elements and pieces that resembled a scrapbook. The team took a "design-first" approach to building out rooms, ensuring that item discovery was easier for players. The developers originally planned to use Tabitha's diary for her life story, but decided to switch to a memoir because it implied her consent for reading it after her passing.

== Reception ==
Reception

Aggregate score
Aggregator	Score
OpenCritic	50% recommend (Note: Based on 6 reviews)

According to the review aggregation website Metacritic, A Storied Life: Tabitha received "mixed or average" reviews, with a score of 70 out of 100 for the Windows version. Fellow review aggregator OpenCritic assessed that the game received fair approval, being recommended by 50% of critics.

The game's art direction and depiction of Tabitha's home received generally consistent praise. Quinn Collins of Pocket Tactics called the design of the house the game's standout feature, highlighting the interactivity of its drawers and furniture, its logical placement of objects, and its artwork. Collins also praised the soundtrack and described the box-packing gameplay as polished and satisfying. PC Gamer's Mollie Taylor described the game as thoughtful and endearing, and found that its packing restrictions encouraged players to consider carefully which possessions they retained.

The memoir mechanic received a more mixed response. Taylor found that choosing words to define Tabitha's life was emotionally engaging, although she noted that some combinations produced unusual passages. Siliconera's Jenni Lada described the game's narrative freedom as largely illusory, arguing that it functioned more as a puzzle about identifying predetermined thematic routes than as an opportunity to construct an original account of Tabitha's life. RockPaperShotgun's James Archer noted that the memoir portion of the game significantly improved from the original demo's release, but it still contained peculiar grammar that players must come to terms with. The Gamer's Kaitlyn Peterson praised the developers for including a "relaxed mode" which makes the puzzle elements easier, in case you want to focus on the narrative without the stress of the packing element.
