= Dropcam =

WiFi camera manufacturer acquired by Google in 2014

Dropcam, Inc.
- Industry: Consumer electronics
- Founded: January 2009
- Founders: Greg Duffy; Aamir Virani
- Fate: Acquired by Google / Nest, rebranded as Nest Cameras
- Successor: Nest Cam
- Headquarters: San Francisco, California, United States
- Area served: United States; Canada
- Products: Dropcam Pro; Cloud Recording; Dropcam App
- Owner: Google Inc (2014–2015); Alphabet Inc. (2015–2024)
- Parent: Nest Labs (2014–2024)
- Website: www.dropcam.com

Dropcam, Inc. was an American technology company headquartered in San Francisco, California. The company is known for its Wi-Fi video streaming cameras, Dropcam and Dropcam Pro, that allow people to view live feeds through Dropcam's cloud-based service. On June 20, 2014, it was announced that Google's Nest Labs bought Dropcam for $555 million, a decision Dropcam co-founder Greg Duffy later described as a "mistake". In June 2015, Nest introduced the Nest Cam, a successor to the Dropcam Pro. Support for Dropcam services ended on April 8, 2024.

== History ==
Software engineers Greg Duffy and Aamir Virani founded Dropcam in 2009. Duffy was Dropcam's CEO and Virani was COO. They originally developed software for cameras made by Swedish company AXIS. With Dropcam wanting to develop a less expensive camera, the two companies parted ways and Dropcam started producing its own cameras that primarily provided video monitoring for homes and small businesses. Duffy and Virani credit Duffy's dad with at least part of the inspiration for Dropcam. He wanted to identify the neighbor who was letting their dog poop on his lawn but they were having trouble finding a security camera that made it easy to record, stream and monitor large amounts of data.

Dropcam received early funding from technology investor Mitch Kapor, and in June 2012, Dropcam secured $12 million in venture capital funding led by Menlo Ventures and previous investors, Accel Partners and Bay Partners. Dropcam has also received funding from Felicis Ventures and Kleiner Perkins Caufield & Byers. The following year, it received $30 million more in funding led by Institutional Venture Partners, bringing the total raised to $47.8 million. Duffy said Dropcam's revenue grew 500 percent year over year.

Dropcam hosts cloud data through Amazon Web Services and Duffy said in 2014 that Dropcam presently records more video than YouTube.

Dropcam has become popular in families watching their children, through monitoring pets at home, at pet stores and in adoption centers. Users have also reportedly caught home-burglaries in progress. Duffy has said, “Moms are using it to catch their babies' first steps when they're not around, checking that older kids have arrived home safely; contacting children who are ignoring their cell phones; and sharing footage from birthday parties.”

Due to the success of Dropcam, several companies launched similar products and services in 2014 and 2015, such as SpotCam and simplicam.

In June 2014 Google acquired Dropcam for $555 million and put it under its Nest Labs. In June 2015, the parent company Nest introduced Nest Cam as a successor to Dropcam Pro.

On April 7, 2023, Google announced that it would end support for both Dropcam and Nest Secure on April 8, 2024.

== Cloud Recording ==
Dropcam provides optional encrypted digital video recording through the cloud. The Cloud Recording service automatically saves video on a rolling basis, so users can review the past week or month of footage, depending on their plan. All users, with or without the service, can still view the live feed. Dropcam allows users to download the video and create video clips while also allowing for the creation of a public stream. About 40% of Dropcam users sign up for the cloud service.

As part of Dropcam's Cloud Recording service, markers are placed on a user's video timeline when motion or audio is detected, so a user may go back and view those specific events rather than watch the whole feed to search for notable activities. Dropcam introduced a beta version of its Activity Recognition feature for Cloud Recording, which learns typical motion patterns in a user's video stream, allowing for customized motion alerts.
