= Ironside (2013 TV series) =

- Genre: Drama; Procedural; Thriller
- Created by: Collier Young
- Developed by: Michael Caleo
- Starring: Blair Underwood; Kenneth Choi; Brent Sexton; Pablo Schreiber; Spencer Grammer; Neal Bledsoe
- Theme music composer: James S. Levine
- Country of origin: United States
- Original language: English
- No. of seasons: 1
- No. of episodes: 9 (5 unaired)

Production
- Executive producers: David Semel; John Davis; Teri Weinberg; John Fox
- Production companies: Universal Television; Davis Entertainment; Yellow Brick Road; Post 109 Productions

Original release
- Network: NBC
- Release: October 2 – October 23, 2013

Related
- Ironside (1967); Sarge; The Bold Ones: The New Doctors; Amy Prentiss

Ironside is an American police drama television series created by Collier Young. It aired on NBC from October 2 to October 23, 2013 during the 2013–14 television season. It was a remake of the original television series Ironside, which ran from 1967 to 1975. It starred Blair Underwood as the title character, wheelchair-using cop Robert Ironside, the only character re-created from the original series. The remade Ironside was grittier and considerably more violent than the original, and the setting was changed from San Francisco to New York City.

Ratings and reviews were unfavorable to the series, and it was canceled on October 18. Only four episodes were aired.

== Production ==
The pilot was written by Michael Caleo, who was also the executive producer, while Universal TV, Davis Entertainment and Yellow Brick Road produced the show.

According to various news outlets, the plot of the show revolved around "a tough, sexy but acerbic police detective using a wheelchair after a shooting" who "is hardly limited by his disability as he pushes and prods his hand-picked team to solve the most difficult cases in the city."

The pilot episode was released for free early on September 10, 2013, via iTunes Store, Amazon.com, and Hulu.

== Cast and characters ==
- Blair Underwood as Robert Ironside
- Brent Sexton as Gary Stanton
- Pablo Schreiber as Virgil
- Spencer Grammer as Holly
- Neal Bledsoe as Teddy
- Kenneth Choi as Captain Ed Rollins
- Jake Picking as Nate

== Episodes ==
No.	Title	Directed by	Written by	Original release date	Prod. code	U.S. viewers (millions)
1	"Pilot"	Peter Horton	Michael Caleo	October 2, 2013	101	6.81
2	"Sleeping Dogs"	Rod Holcomb	Robert Port	October 9, 2013	104	5.18
3	"Action"	Stephen Gyllenhaal	David Schulner	October 16, 2013	105	4.80
4	"Uptown Murders"	Oz Scott	Mark Rosner	October 23, 2013	103	3.85
5	"Hell on Wheels"	Alex Zakrzewski	Mick Betancourt	April 8, 2014 (iTunes)	102	N/A
6	"Pentimento"	David Boyd	Ken Sanzel	April 8, 2014 (iTunes)	106	N/A
7	"Minor Infractions"	Martha Mitchell	Judith McCreary	April 8, 2014 (iTunes)	107	N/A
8	"Brothers in Arms"	Darnell Martin	Brian Anthony	April 8, 2014 (iTunes)	108	N/A
9	"Hidden Agenda"	Alex Zakrzewski	Nicole R. Levy	April 8, 2014 (iTunes)	109	N/A

== Reception ==
The new Ironside received negative reviews from critics. The review aggregator Rotten Tomatoes gave the show an approval score of 14% based on 28 reviews, with an average rating of 4.3/10; the critics consensus said: "Ironside is an unnecessary, lackluster remake that could be a decent police procedural if it wasn't so mundane and monotonous."

Brian Tallerico of HollywoodChicago called it the "Worst New Drama of 2013" and awarded it 1 star out of 5, saying: "[Ironside is] the most clichéd, least believable, least fun, and just awful new drama of the year. It is aggressively bad. Avoid at all costs. Blair Underwood ... deserves better than the horrendous, uninteresting writing here. [Ironside] should be a way to explore how our physical well-being is only one part of our lives and how we approach our work, even crimefighting. It’s not. It’s just manipulative drama that hopes to make you stand up and cheer by reminding you over and over again how tough its title character remains."

Neil Genzlinger of The New York Times called the title character "an unpleasant combination of macho and brusque" and the handling of his disability "thuddingly didactic" and "one that is not doing real people with disabilities any favors". He called the storylines "bland", the reason for Ironside's disability "predictable" and the writing "plodding". (The backstory of Ironside's disabling wound was different in the remake than in the original series.)

Robert Bianco of USA Today gave the show 1.5 stars out of 4. He called it an "atrociously clunky" remake that "jettison[ed] whatever wit and intelligence the original possessed".

=== Casting of non-disabled actor in lead role ===
Controversy arose over the decision to cast non-disabled actor Blair Underwood in the role of paraplegic Robert Ironside. Sons of Anarchy actor Kurt Yaeger, himself an amputee, compared the act to blackface, and said disabled characters should be played by disabled actors. Auti Angel, a paralyzed actress who appears in the Sundance Channel's reality series Push Girls, was quoted as saying: "What are they afraid of? There are so many extremely talented individuals who are performing artists with a different ability." Robert Bianco of USA Today went as far as to boycott the show by going on strike. However, fellow Push Girls star Angela Rockwood says she is not opposed to Ironside because the drama, like her show, challenges perceptions of how those in wheelchairs should look and act.

Teri Weinberg, executive producer of Ironside, stated that the role was cast with a non-disabled actor because the show features flashbacks to Ironside's life before he became a paraplegic, which "required an actor to be on their feet in their previous life".
