= Making Mr. Right =

1987 film by Susan Seidelman

- Theatrical release poster
- Directed by: Susan Seidelman
- Written by: Floyd Byars; Laurie Frank
- Produced by: Joel Tuber
- Starring: John Malkovich; Ann Magnuson
- Cinematography: Edward Lachman
- Edited by: Andrew Mondshein
- Music by: Chaz Jankel
- Production company: Barry & Enright Productions
- Distributed by: Orion Pictures
- Release date: April 3, 1987
- Running time: 99 minutes
- Country: United States
- Language: English
- Budget: $9 million
- Box office: $1,584,970

Making Mr. Right is a 1987 American science fiction romantic comedy film directed by Susan Seidelman; starring John Malkovich as Jeff Peters/Ulysses and Ann Magnuson as Frankie Stone.

This film is primarily about the relationship between an android and the human woman he begins to fall in love with.

== Plot ==
Dr. Jeff Peters is an emotionally repressed scientist who cannot stand others because of their intellectual inferiority. He dreams of deep space exploration, which would be difficult because of the lack of human contact for long periods of time. He develops the Ulysses android (which looks exactly like him) for the purpose of space exploration, since an android would not be affected by the isolation.

Frankie Stone is hired to do public relations for the project. She meets project manager Dr. Ramdas and Jeff, who both give Frankie an overview of the Ulysses project. As a part of her job, she must get to know the android better, in order to "humanize" him for the benefit of the project's sponsors in Congress. However, in his interaction with her, the android develops emotions and develops better social skills than Jeff himself. At one point, the android impersonates Jeff in order to leave the laboratory, and stows away in Frankie's Chevrolet Corvair. After escaping, he encounters human society at a shopping mall, buys a tuxedo, goes on a date with a woman named Sandy McCleary who thinks he is Jeff, reducing her to an emotional wreck, and then literally loses his head over Frankie's best friend Trish who has taken refuge in Frankie's apartment after walking out on her husband who is a star on the popular daytime soap opera New Jersey.

Frankie also develops feelings for the android and befriends Jeff on a lesser level. Frankie's mother Estelle learns from the mother Frankie's ex-boyfriend that Frankie has a doctor boyfriend (Jeff) and expects Frankie to bring him to the wedding of Frankie's sister Ivy. Frankie persuades Jeff to come, but Ulysses again absconds from the lab and gate-crashes the wedding. Trish's jealous TV-star husband crashes the wedding as well and gets into a fight with Ulysses. Ulysses short-circuits and crashes into the swimming pool, turning the occasion into a public relations disaster. Frankie is fired from her job and forbidden contact with Ulysses or anyone on the project. She then uses her connections with a former client and boyfriend Steve Marcus, a candidate for Congress to attend Ulysses’ launch day in an attempt to say goodbye to Ulysses, but is rebuffed by Jeff and then forced to leave by Dr. Ramdas. Ulysses then gives his farewell speech, in which he bemoans humanity's difficulty in forming relationships, both platonic and romantic.

However, Ulysses appears at Frankie's front door during the launch; Jeff actually presented that final speech himself, having realized his creation has become more empathic than him. As the lack of human contact of a seven-year space mission will not be a hardship for him due to asociality, Jeff decided to go into space while the android takes his place on Earth so Ulysses and Frankie (who by now are deeply in love) can be together.

== Cast ==
- John Malkovich as Dr. Jeff Peters/Ulysses
- Ann Magnuson as Frankie Stone
- Glenne Headly as Trish
- Ben Masters as Steve Marcus
- Laurie Metcalf as Sandra "Sandy" McCleary
- Polly Bergen as Estelle Stone
- Harsh Nayyar as Dr. Ramdas
- Hart Bochner as Don
- Susan Berman as Ivy Stone
- Polly Draper as Suzy Duncan
- Christian Clemenson as Bruce
- Merwin Goldsmith as Moe Glickstein

== Production ==
In a 2023 interview, Seidelman reflected on thought process in making the film: "I like playing with genres and using them to tell more personal stories. Making Mr. Right is a sci-fi movie that talks about the power dynamics between men and women. A lot of what’s in these films reflects where I was in my life at the time I was making them. When I was working on Making Mr. Right, I was a successful working woman, and my professional life was very together, but my personal life was very confused, so I wanted to tell a story about a woman who is also experiencing that disconnect." This was the first film of a three-picture deal between Seidelman and Orion Pictures, and she elected to shoot the film in Miami in light of its locale and the idea to aim for a "retro-futurism" look.

== Reception ==
The film received generally positive reviews from critics, it holds a 60% rating on Rotten Tomatoes from 15 reviews. Janet Maslin of The New York Times, comparing it with Seidelman's previous Desperately Seeking Susan, described Making Mr. Right as one that "has much the same sense of whimsy and the same distinctive touch. But it's a little more labored, and a little less fun." Roger Ebert labeled the film as "smart, quick witted, wicked and genuinely funny movie."

The movie, however, was not a success with audiences, although Seidelman held no reservations about the experience of making the film, reflecting in an interview for The New Yorker in 2024 after a screening:

I was so happy with the response to that screening, because, when a movie is a flop, people tend to not want to talk about it. I loved making “Making Mr. Right,” but people seem to not want to bring up the fact that it was a flop at the box-office or hurt my feelings. It was in theatres for such a short amount of time, and then it was never really pushed on DVD. So Metrograph was the first time I had seen it with an audience up on a big screen in thirty years. And I laughed! I always thought maybe people didn’t get the style. It’s an A.I. romantic comedy.

== Home media ==
Making Mr. Right was released to DVD by MGM Home Video on April 1, 2003.

== See also ==
- List of American films of 1987
