= Julia Vera =

American actress (born 1941)

- Born: January 23, 1941 (age 85); Laredo, Texas, U.S.
- Occupation: Actress
- Years active: 1963–present
- Spouse: Andrew Andrews (deceased)
- Children: 5

Julia Vera Andrews (born January 23, 1941) is an American actress, best known for portraying latin women and characters in numerous television shows as well as for providing the voice of Luisa in Disney animated series Elena of Avalor.

== Life and career ==
Vera was born in Laredo, Texas. She has mixed heritage including Indian, Texan, and Spanish ancestry. She is one of fourteen children, growing up in a large household. She moved with her family to Los Angeles in 1965. After raising her children, Vera decided to pursue acting more formally. At age 46 she joined an acting class in Los Angeles, where an agent noticed her; this led to her being represented and beginning to audition in film and television.

She has appeared in a variety of TV series and films credits including Speed (1994), Blow (2001), and guest roles in series such as Dexter, Criminal Minds, CSI: Miami, The X-Files, General Hospital, Pasadena, ER, Dexter, My Name is Earl, Reno 911!, among others. Vera also voiced Grandmother Luisa Flores in Disney's Elena of Avalor for multiple seasons. In stage she involved with Nosotros, an organization founded by Ricardo Montalbán, producing and directing plays. She played a healer/witch character in The Old Ways and also in Laredo Theater. She has had roles in contemporary shows and films including The Ridiculous Six, and had a regular role in This Fool.

== Personal life ==
Julia is widow and have five children, her oldest one Pembrooke Andrews is a supervising sound editor, she resides in California.

== Filmography ==
- Holly Cash (2024) - Old Lady Milagros
- This Fool (2022–2023) - Maria
- The Old Ways (2020) - Luz
- The Little Things (2020)
- Elena of Avalor (2016–2020) - Luisa
- The Quarry (2020) - Rosario
- Case 347 (2020) - Socorro Luna
- Strange Angel (2019) - Kristina
- Turnover (2019) - Wela
- Flavor of Life (2019) - Aunt Rosa
- Ant-Man and the Wasp (2018) - Luis's Abuelita
- Zoo (2017) - Alma Pinedo
- Swedish Dicks (2016)
- Aztec Warrior (2016) - Mama
- The Ridiculous 6 (2015) - Esmeralda
- Agent X (2015) - Lucia
- Matador (2014)
- The Protector (2011) - Reina
- Love Bites (2011) - Ramirez
- Mamitas (2011) - Miss Palencia
- Brothers & Sisters (2010) - Mateo's Abuelita
- Not Forgotten (2009) - Doña
- Crossing Over (2009) - Juan's Grandmother
- Gordon Glass (2007) - Abuelita
- My Name Is Earl (2007) - Catalina's Mother
- Dexter (2007)
- Man in the Chair (2007) - Montana
- Criminal Minds (2006) - Lupe Trejo
- The Virgin of Juarez (2006) - Arcelia
- The Shield (2006)
- Will & Grace (2005)
- CSI: Miami (2005) - Marisol Fuentes
- ER (2003) - Reina
- Cold Case (2003) - Maria Sanchez
- Six Feet Under (2003)
- Fastlane (2003) - Inez
- The X-Files (1998–2002) - Lana Chee
- Role of a Lifetime (2002)
- Pumpkin (2002) - Ramona Ramirez
- NYPD Blue (2001) - Anna Rodriguez
- Pasadena (2001) - Rosa
- The Glass House (2001) - Vicki
- The Division (2001) - Mr. Guiterrez
- Dharma & Greg (1999) - Maria
- Air America (1998) - Sister Rafaela
- Dangerous Minds (1996) - Mrs. Lopez
- Beverly Hills, 90210 (1995)
- Speed (1994)
- Homeboys (1994) - Anna
- L.A. Law (1991) - Margarita Sanchez
- Lady Avenger (1988) - Mrs. Galvin
- General Hospital (1963) - Marta Morez
