= Old Ways (disambiguation) =

Old Ways is an album by Neil Young.

Old Ways may also refer to:

- "Old Ways", song by Neil Young from Old Ways
- "Old Ways", song by Demi Lovato from Confident

== See also ==
- The Old Ways, a 2020 American horror film
- The Old Ways, an award winning 2012 book by Robert Macfarlane
