= Ron Nyswaner =

American screenwriter and film director (born 1956)

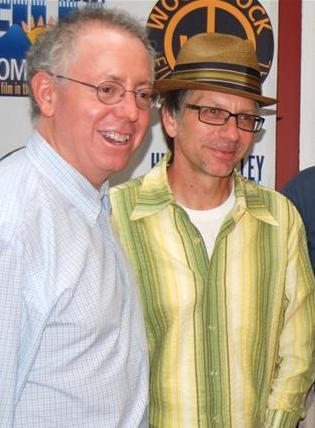
- James Schamus (left) and Nyswaner (right), 2009
- Born: October 5, 1956 (age 69); Clarksville, Pennsylvania, U.S.
- Education: University of Pittsburgh (BA); Columbia University (MFA)
- Occupations: Film director, writer

Ronald L. Nyswaner (/ˈnaɪswɑːnər/ NY-swahn-ər ; born October 5, 1956) is an American screenwriter and film director. He is a Peabody Award winner, and has been nominated for numerous awards including an Academy Award, BAFTA Award, and two Primetime Emmy Awards.

He is known for his screenplays Smithereens (1982), Philadelphia (1993), The Painted Veil (2006), Freeheld (2015), and My Policeman (2022). He is also known as a writer and producer of the Showtime series Ray Donovan (2013–2015), Homeland (2017–2018), and the historical drama series Fellow Travelers (2023).

== Early life and education ==
Nyswaner was born in Clarksville, Pennsylvania. He later attended the University of Pittsburgh and Columbia University.

== Career ==
Nyswaner wrote his first screenplay for the Susan Seidelman film Smithereens. After two other notable screenplays for Swing Shift and Mrs. Soffel, he gave his directorial debut with The Prince of Pennsylvania in 1988, a film with Keanu Reeves and Fred Ward.

Nyswaner, who is openly gay and an activist for gay rights, has often worked on movies dealing with subjects such as homosexuality, homophobia, and AIDS. In 1993, he came to worldwide prominence for his screenplay to the Academy Award-winning movie Philadelphia, directed by Jonathan Demme. It earned him nominations at the Academy Awards, the Golden Globes, and the BAFTAs.

After several years of working for television, he wrote the screenplay for the 2006 film The Painted Veil, based on the novel by W. Somerset Maugham. He received a nomination for the Independent Spirit Award and won the award of the National Board of Review in 2006.

From 2015 to 2017, he was an executive producer for the Showtime TV series Homeland.

In 2015, Nyswaner directed the documentary film She's the Best Thing in It, featuring Mary Louise Wilson, which he coproduced along with Jeffrey Schwarz and Neda Armian.

Nyswaner created the historical drama miniseries Fellow Travelers in 2023, which won a Peabody Award at the 84th ceremony in 2024.

== Filmography ==
=== Film ===
As a director

Year	Title	Notes
1988	The Prince of Pennsylvania	also written
2012	Why Stop Now?	co-directed with Phil Dorling; also written
2015	She's the Best Thing in It	documentary

As a writer

Year	Title	Notes
1982	Smithereens	
1984	Mrs. Soffel	
1989	Gross Anatomy	
1990	Love Hurts	
1993	Philadelphia	
2006	The Painted Veil	
2015	Freeheld	
2022	My Policeman	

=== Television ===
Year	Title	Notes	Ref.
2003	Soldier's Girl	Television movie	
2006	Filthy Gorgeous	Television movie	
2013–2014	Ray Donovan	Wrote 4 episodes; also co-executive producer	
2015–2018	Homeland	Wrote 9 episodes; also co-executive producer	
2020	Murder on Middle Beach	Co-executive producer only	
2023	Fellow Travelers	Screenwriter and executive producer	

== Awards and nominations ==
Year	Award	Category	Project	Result
1988	Deauville Film Festival	Critics Prize	The Prince of Pennsylvania	Nominated
1989	Independent Spirit Awards	Best First Feature	The Prince of Pennsylvania	Nominated
1993	Academy Award	Best Original Screenplay	Philadelphia	Nominated
1993	Golden Globe Awards	Best Screenplay	Philadelphia	Nominated
1993	British Academy Film Awards	Best Original Screenplay	Philadelphia	Nominated
1993	Writers Guild of America Awards	Best Original Screenplay	Philadelphia	Nominated
2006	Independent Spirit Awards	Best Screenplay	The Painted Veil	Nominated
2006	National Board of Review	Best Adapted Screenplay	The Painted Veil	Won
2014	Writers Guild of America Awards	New Series	Ray Donovan	Nominated
2015	SXSW Film Festival	Grand Jury Documentary Prize	She's The Best Thing in It	Nominated
2015	Woodstock Film Festival	Audience Award	She's The Best Thing in It	Won
2016	Primetime Emmy Awards	Outstanding Drama Series	Homeland	Nominated
2024	Primetime Emmy Awards	Outstanding Writing for a Limited or Anthology Series or Movie	Fellow Travelers	Nominated
2024	Peabody Awards	Chronicling LGBTQ+ History Over 50 Years	Fellow Travelers	Won

== Bibliography ==
In 2004, he published Blue Days, Black Nights: A Memoir, which chronicles his relationship with alcohol, drugs, and hustlers.
