= The Mortician =

- Directed by: Gareth Maxwell Roberts
- Written by: Gareth Maxwell Roberts
- Produced by: Rene Bastian; Linda Moran; Gareth Maxwell Roberts; Rhys Thomas
- Starring: Method Man; Dash Mihok; Dana Fuchs; Edward Furlong
- Cinematography: Michael McDonough
- Edited by: David Charap
- Music by: Mike Benn
- Release date: February 2011 (Berlin)
- Running time: 89 minutes
- Country: United Kingdom
- Language: English

The Mortician is a 2011 British thriller film written and directed by Gareth Maxwell Roberts and starring Method Man, Dash Mihok, Dana Fuchs and Edward Furlong.

== Cast ==
- Method Man as The Mortician
- Dash Mihok as Carver
- E. J. Bonilla as Noah
- Judy Marte as Jenny
- Angelic Zambrana as Maria
- Wendell Pierce as Clinger
- Dana Fuchs as Eva
- Edward Furlong as Petrovski
- Cruz Santiago as Kane

The Mortician is a solitary, isolated man who discovers a young boy hiding in the mortuary. We learn via flashback throughout the movie that the Mortician, as a child, loved & was loved by his mother, with whom he lived alone. She leaves him every night after making herself pretty and does not return one night, devastating him and making him the solitary, lonely man he becomes. The boy he finds is the nephew of his assistant employee, a parolee, who we discover is the uncle of the young boy. We learn the boy just wants to see and say goodbye to his mother, who was brought to the mortician by the authorities after being found murdered and dumped in a local body of water. One of the first scenes in the movie is of the mortician removing seaweed from her body and noting her tattoo of Venus, the classic image, emerging from the clamshell. We learn that she has been raped and murdered by the boy’s father, her lover. He is an exceptionally vile and violent character and spends much of the movie looking for the boy, probably to kill him to one assumes, as he apparently witnessed the murder. Ultimately the evil father confronts the boy, the mortician the uncle and the uncle’s girlfriend in the mortuary after the mortician has made her more attractive so that her son can see her and say goodbye. As the mortician did not get to do when his mother disappeared.
