= Four (2012 film) =

2012 film by Joshua Sanchez

- Theatrical release poster
- Directed by: Joshua Sanchez
- Written by: Joshua Sanchez
- Based on: Four by Christopher Shinn
- Produced by: Christine Giorgio; Wendell Pierce
- Starring: Wendell Pierce; Emory Cohen; Aja Naomi King; E. J. Bonilla
- Cinematography: Gregg Conde
- Edited by: David Gutnik
- Music by: Bryan Senti
- Production companies: Blue Noon Films; Four Films
- Distributed by: 306 Releasing
- Release dates: July 15, 2012 (LAFF); September 13, 2013 (United States)
- Running time: 75 minutes
- Country: United States
- Language: English

Four is a 2012 American romantic drama film written and directed by Joshua Sanchez (in his feature directorial debut), based on the play of the same name by Christopher Shinn. It stars Wendell Pierce (who also produced), Emory Cohen, Aja Naomi King, and E. J. Bonilla. It revolves around two couples struggling with their desires and demons on the night of the Fourth of July.

The film had its world premiere at the Los Angeles Film Festival on July 15, 2012, and was given a limited theatrical release in the United States on September 13, 2013, by 306 Releasing. It received positive reviews from critics, who mostly praised the performances of the cast. It was nominated for Outstanding Independent Film at the 13th Black Reel Awards, while Pierce was nominated for Best Male Lead at the 28th Independent Spirit Awards.

== Cast ==
- Wendell Pierce as Joe
- Emory Cohen as June
- Aja Naomi King as Abigayle
- E.J. Bonilla as Dexter
- Yolonda Ross as Abigayle's Mother
- Liam Benzvi as Todd
- Kathryn Meisle as June's Mom

== Production ==
Four was based on Christopher Shinn's 1998 play of the same name, and was inspired by John Cassavetes' Faces and Larry Clark's Kids. Joshua Sanchez first met and interviewed Shinn in 2003 while working for an online magazine. He had read all of Shinn's plays, including Four, as research for the interview. In the following year, Sanchez was approached by Shinn to obtain the rights to the play because another filmmaker didn't renew the option.

Sanchez said about adapting the play:

It was a fairly organic process for me. I don't think any of us working on the film – Chris included – were interested in making a filmed stage play. […] A lot of films based on plays are really brilliant, but there are a lot that don't work. I think this play had a sense of movement, a visual sense to it – it was already inherent in the play but we just tried to heighten all of that.

To raise money for the film, Sanchez and his producer, Christine Giorgio, were among some of the first artists to use the crowdfunding website, Kickstarter in December 2009. They successfully raised nearly $20,000 for their initial campaign. Neil LaBute and Allen Frame served as executive producers. The film took over five years to make.

== Themes ==
The film is a requiem for loneliness, conformity and desire quietly hidden in the everyday norms of suburban American life and touches on several cultural boundaries, including sexuality, class and race. Three of the film's four main characters are people of color.

About Four Sanchez said:

I've had so many people in the business tell me that people here and abroad do not want to watch serious films about people of color. It’s really fucked up. I think it’s changing...because people, real moviegoers, are sort of starved to see their lives reflected back to them in the cinema.

== Release ==
The film was released on September 13, 2013.

== Reception ==
=== Critical response ===
On the review aggregator website Rotten Tomatoes, 67% of 6 critics' reviews are positive, with an average rating of 6.4/10.

Stephen Holden of The New York Times stated, "This talky film doesn't try to disguise its origins as a stage play, and as Four shifts between the two couples, you are aware of its mechanics. […] But the close-ups of faces convey reams of inchoate emotion and enhance the stumbling poetry mouthed by characters whose urge to connect conflicts with their innate sense of caution."

Andrew Barker of Variety remarked, "Spotlighting a quartet of furiously committed performances, and burnished by vivid, atmospheric lensing, Joshua Sanchez's Four assembles a strikingly impressive facade, though its source material makes for an unstable foundation."

Emma Bernstein of IndieWire gave the film a grade of "A" and wrote, "The dialogue retains a particular flair of playwriting in its word choice and rhythm. […] While all four leads are great, Pierce steals the show with his multi-layered performance that is often best at its quietest."

Justin Lowe of The Hollywood Reporter opined, "Despite an edgy premise, Four is beset by superficial plotting and a problematic degree of equivocating moral relativism." Lowe also commented, "Sanchez's tightly framed scenes, often slightly destabilized by handheld camerawork, are par for character-driven dramas and offer little in terms of subtextual commentary."

=== Accolades ===
Award	Date	Category	Recipient(s)	Result
28th Annual Imagen Awards	August 16, 2013	Best Actor/Supporting Actor - Feature Film	E.J. Bonilla	Nominated
28th Independent Spirit Awards	February 23, 2013	Best Male Lead	Wendell Pierce	Nominated
Urbanworld Film Festival	September 24, 2012	Best Narrative Feature	Four	Won
Los Angeles Film Festival	June 24, 2012	Best Performance in the Narrative Competition	Wendell Pierce, Emory Cohen, Aja N. King, E.J. Bonilla	Won
