= Stolen (2009 American film) =

2009 American mystery film

- Promotional poster
- Directed by: Anders Anderson
- Written by: Glenn Taranto
- Produced by: Anders Anderson; Al Corley; Josh Lucas; Devin Maurer; Bart Rosenblatt; Andy Steinman
- Starring: Josh Lucas; Jon Hamm; Rhona Mitra; James Van Der Beek
- Cinematography: Andy Steinmann
- Edited by: Anders Anderson
- Music by: Trevor Morris
- Production companies: 2 Bridges Productions; A2 Entertainment Group; Boy in the Box; Code Entertainment
- Distributed by: IFC Films
- Release dates: October 10, 2009 (Pusan Film Festival); March 12, 2010 (United States)
- Country: United States
- Language: English
- Box office: $7,943 (United States)

Stolen is a 2009 American mystery film directed by Anders Anderson, and starring Josh Lucas, Jon Hamm and Rhona Mitra.

== Plot ==
The police officer Tom Adkins Sr. loses his son while briefly leaving him in a diner. Eight years later, he is still struggling with the loss when he and his wife, Barbara get a call that a child’s body has been discovered buried within a suitcase at a construction yard. They assume that their son has been found, but the police forensics unit determines the remains are 50 years old. Seeking redemption from his own son’s disappearance, Tom takes on trying to solve the death of this unidentified child.

In 1958, Matthew Wakefield finds that his wife has committed suicide. Unemployed and with three young boys to raise, he leaves his elder sons with his sister Cora, and her husband Jonas. Cora's husband won’t take care of Matthew's youngest son, John, because of his cognitive disabilities and so Matthew takes him with him as he goes out to look for work.

Matthew finds work at a construction site in a small town, where he finds friends among the fellow laborers, The Swede and Diploma. While out at the bar one night with his friends and son, Matthew meets Rose Montgomery, the wife of a local gas-station owner. Rose seduces Matthew and takes him out behind the bar while John disappears from the car where Matthew had left him sleeping.

Back in the present, Tom is attempting to piece together the details about what happened 50 years ago, despite few surviving witnesses. Matthew's wife, Sally Ann Wakefield, tells Tom that Matthew could never get rid of his own guilt and that John's disappearance may have something to do with Roggiani, the only person who helped Matthew to look for his son.

In 1958, the police chief thinks that Matthew is exaggerating and threatens to expose his affair with Rose to her husband. Diploma seemingly helps Matthew search the town, but his behavior is unusual and when Matthew is away, Diploma is seen putting nails into an old suitcase. Meanwhile, Matthew goes to Rose’s house and threatens her husband, who disparages John and calls him retarded.

In the present, Tom is growing increasingly obsessed with the case and its similarities to his own son’s disappearance. Sally Ann shows Tom an old photograph of Matthew, John, and Roggiani, who Tom identifies as Diploma. Tom confronts Diploma about what happened in the spring of 1958.

Diploma reveals he used to work at the building site with Matthew and admits to killing John because he felt the boy was destroying Matthew's life. Diploma says that that boy should have never been born at all. During the interrogation, Tom pushes Diploma, who admits to another killing where he found a boy who had wandered into a fairground where Diploma was playing a clown. He recounts taking the boy and breaking his neck under a tree. It is implied that this was Tom’s son.

In the conclusion, Tom has solved both murders and recovers the body of his son, buried in the ground under Diploma’s mobile home. At the funeral, Tom leans in on his wife and allows himself to break down and cry.

== Cast ==
- Jon Hamm as Tom Adkins, A Policeman Whose Son Disappeared Ten Years Earlier
- Josh Lucas as Matthew Wakefield, The Father of A Boy Murdered In 1958
- Rhona Mitra as Barbara Adkins, The Policeman's Wife
- Jimmy Bennett as John Wakefield
- James Van Der Beek as Rogianni / "Diploma"
- Marcus Thomas as Pete Dunne
- Jessica Chastain as Sally Ann
  - Rutanya Alda as Older Sally Ann
- Morena Baccarin as Rose Montgomery
- Glenn Taranto as Chollie
- Holt McCallany as "Swede"

== Production ==
The film was conceived as The Boy in the Box and was later renamed Stolen Lives. In January 2010, IFC Films acquired the rights of the theatrical release and renamed the film Stolen.

== Release ==
Stolen was released on March 3, 2010 as Video on Demand and in a limited theatrical release on March 12.

== Reception ==
Upon release, the film was universally panned by critics. On review aggregator website Rotten Tomatoes, the film has a rare approval rating of 0% based on 21 reviews, with an average rating of 4.1/10. The site's critical consensus reads, "With plot points Stolen from countless superior films, this would-be thriller squanders a solid cast on overly serious and suspense-free storytelling." Metacritic, which uses a weighted average, assigned the film a score of 34 out of 100, based on 12 critics, indicating "generally unfavorable" reviews.

== See also ==
- List of films with a 0% rating on Rotten Tomatoes
