= Glenn Taranto =

American actor, screenwriter

Glenn Taranto (born 1958 or 1959 (age 67–68)) is an American actor and screenwriter, who played Gomez Addams in The New Addams Family.

He has appeared in six of Paul Haggis' projects.

Taranto's first screenplay, Stolen, starring Josh Lucas and Jon Hamm, was produced by A2 Entertainment and Code Entertainment and released to American theatres in 2010.

In 2020, Taranto played the role of Don Ennio Salieri in the 2020 video game Mafia: Definitive Edition, a remake of the 2002 video game by Illusion Softworks. Taranto previously lent his voice and likeness to a minor character in Mafia III.

== Early life and education ==
Raised in Island Heights, New Jersey, Taranto performed in school musicals at St. Joseph High School (since renamed as Donovan Catholic High School).

== Filmography ==
=== Film ===
Year	Title	Role	Notes
1989	Rude Awakening	Bob Hope	
1994	Columbo: Butterfly in Shades of Grey	Engineer	TV movie
1994	Forsaken	Priest	Short
1997	8 Heads in a Duffel Bag	Mr. Escobedo	
2003	Tilt	Miguel Saavedra	Short
2004	Crash	Country DJ (voice)	
2004	The Tao of Pong	Larry	Short
2004	A Night at Sophie's	George	
2005	The Devil's Rejects	Anchorman	
2006	George Bush Goes to Heaven	Jim	
2006	The Legend of William Tell	Trapper	
2006	Quid Pro Quo	Son	Short
2007	In the Valley of Elah	Detective Wayne	
2008	Waiting	Kevin	Short
2008	The Kings of Appletown	Potter	
2009	Charlie Valentine	Mob Collector	
2009	Stolen	Chollie	
2009	Armored	Joe the Cook	
2010	PrimeMates	Pablo	
2010	Sinatra Club	Salerno	
2010	Space Ranger: A Documentary	Ted Bruce	Short
2010	The Next Three Days	Hospital Security Guard	
2010	Vic's Cafe	Vic	Short
2011	Mamitas	Jimmy	
2015	The Adventures of Biffle and Shooster	Vernon Dent	
2015	Imitation of Wife	Vernon Dent	Short
2016	Shangri-La Suite	News Anchor #1	
2018	Papi Chulo	News Anchor Kenny	
2024	Break	Mr. Wilkinson	
2024	Rock and Doris (try to) Write a Movie	Chief Kelsey	
2025	Ciao, Mama	Funeral Attendee	
2025	The Insight	Cpt. Harold 'Corvette' Corvalan	Short

=== Television ===
Year	Title	Role	Notes
1991	One Life to Live	Security Guard	Episode: "Episode: #1.5831"
1992	All My Children	Security Guard	Episode: "Episode: #1.5721"
1992	Loving	Policeman	Episode: "Episode: #1.2366" & "#1.2367"
1992	Law & Order	Squad Room Detective	Episodes: "Blood Is Thicker..."
1992–93	Law & Order	Manetti	Guest Cast: Season 3-4
1993	The Adventures of Brisco County, Jr.	Referee	Episode: "Riverboat"
1993	Murder, She Wrote	Mechanic	Episodes: "The Survivor"
1994	Murder, She Wrote	Jimmy Russell	Episodes: "A Nest of Vipers"
1994	General Hospital	Ballistics Expert	Episode: "Episode: #1.8110"
1994	Days of Our Lives	Marty Archer/P.A. Announcer	Regular Cast
1994	Sisters	Little Big Al's Father	Episode: "Paradise Lost"
1995	Women of the House	Marshall	Episode: "Guess Who's Sleeping in Lincoln's Bed"
1996–97	EZ Streets	Glenn	Recurring Cast
1997	USA High	The Maintenance Man	Episodes: "Once Upon an Elevator"
1997	The Visitor	FBI Agent	Episode: "Going Home"
1997–98	Michael Hayes	Jake	Recurring Cast
1997–98	Brooklyn South	Officer Gene Kantorski	Recurring Cast
1998–99	The New Addams Family	Gomez Addams	Main Cast
2000	Days of Our Lives	Strip Club Manager	Regular Cast
2002	NYPD Blue	Jerry Hopkins	Episode: "Safari, So Good"
2002	Without a Trace	Marconi	Episode: "Suspect"
2002	ER	O'Malley	Episode: "A Simple Twist of Fate"
2003	Charmed	Foreman	Episode: "The Power of the Three Blondes"
2003	Boston Public	Marty Glass	Episode: "Chapter Seventy-One"
2005	Boston Legal	Maitre D'	Episode: "Let Sales Ring"
2005	Desperate Housewives	Undercover Cop	Episode: "The Ladies Who Lunc"
2005	Passions	District Attorney	Episode: "Episode: #1.1600" & "#1.1601"
2005–06	Rodney	Ring Announcer/Guard	Guest Cast: Season 1-2
2006	ER	Rizzo	Episode: "Ames v. Kovac"
2006	CSI: Crime Scene Investigation	Bus Driver	Episode: "Burn Out"
2007	The Black Donnellys	Counter Guy	Episode: "Pilot"
2008	Raising the Bar	Lloyd	Episode: "Guatemala Gulfstream"
2008	Terminator: The Sarah Connor Chronicles	Bardo	Episode: "Brothers of Nablus"
2009	Private Practice	Detective Lampert	Episode: "Finishing"
2009	Castle	Douglas Lawson	Episode: "Vampire Weekend"
2010	Men of a Certain Age	Irate Contractor	Episode: "Powerless"
2010	Better Off Ted	Lou	Episode: "Mess of a Salesman"
2010	The Forgotten	'Gus' Diner Manager	Episode: "Mama Jane"
2010	CSI: NY	James Sheehan	Episode: "The 34th Floor"
2010	Rules of Engagement	Mr. Micelli	Episode: "Mannequin Head Ball"
2010	Law & Order: LA	Sgt. Greeley	Episode: "Ballona Greek"
2011	Torchwood	Security Chief	Episode: "Miracle Day: Rendition"
2011	NCIS: Los Angeles	Security Man	Episode: "Greed"
2011	The Whole Truth	Detective	Episode: "Perfect Witness"
2012	Common Law	Henry	Episode: "Odd Couples"
2012	Scandal	Manager	Episode: "Hunting Season"
2013	We Are Men	Cab Driver	Episode: "We Are Gentlemen"
2014	NCIS	Eddie Kowolski	Episode: "So It Goes"
2014	Awkward	Father Sheridan	Episode: "Girl Rules"
2015	Richie Rich	King Frank	Episode: "Royal Flu$h"
2015	Agent Carter	Detective Prendergast	Episode: "Valediction"
2017	Shameless	Mike	Recurring Cast: Season 8
2020	Hollywood	Doctor	Episode: "Hooray for Hollywood: Part 2"
2021	General Hospital	Vincent Novak	Regular Cast
2023	Paul T. Goldman	Royce Auditioner	Recurring Cast
2023	The Company You Keep	Wall Street Fat Cat	Episode: "Against All Odds"
2026	Tulsa King	Thomas Abramo	Episode: "W.W.D.D." (Season 4, Episode 1)

=== Video games ===
Year	Title	Role	Notes
2016	Mafia III	Police Chief Earl Wilson	
2020	Mafia: Definitive Edition	Don Ennio Salieri	
2026	Mafia: The Old Country	Don Ennio Salieri	Trailer narration only
