= The Hot Flashes =

2013 American comedy film

- Theatrical release poster
- Directed by: Susan Seidelman
- Written by: Brad Hennig
- Produced by: Jenny Johnson; Susan Seidelman
- Starring: Brooke Shields; Daryl Hannah; Virginia Madsen; Wanda Sykes; Eric Roberts; Mark Povinelli; Camryn Manheim
- Cinematography: Alar Kivilo
- Edited by: Keiko Deguchi
- Music by: Tim Starnes
- Production company: The Hot Flashes LLC
- Distributed by: Vertical Entertainment
- Release date: July 12, 2013
- Running time: 99 minutes
- Country: United States
- Language: English
- Box office: $5.6 million

The Hot Flashes is a 2013 American sports comedy film directed by Susan Seidelman and starring Brooke Shields, Daryl Hannah, Wanda Sykes, Virginia Madsen, Camryn Manheim, Eric Roberts, and Mark Povinelli. This film was also an attempt to raise awareness for breast cancer as well as defy stereotypes of age. It was released on July 12, 2013.

== Plot ==
Beth Humphrey is a middle-aged woman living in Burning Bush Texas. One day, while going through menopause, she discovers that the local breast cancer screening unit is closing due to a lack of funding. Beth is upset as her friend Tess Muldoon, who died from breast cancer three years ago left the center her money and the state was going to match it. Beth then discovers that there was a mix-up when she filed the paperwork and that she had to reapply yearly. She later calls the state health department which tells her that she needs to raise $25,000 within two months to keep the clinic open.

Beth gets in contact with some other women from the Burning Bush High School's 1980 basketball team. Ginger Peabody, who owns a car dealership, Florine Clarkston, who's running for mayor, Roxie Rosales, a pothead and Clementine Winks, a multiple divorcee. Beth tells them they can get the money if they can make $15,000 on concessions and admissions, as well as a betting pool on themselves for three games against the state champions the Lady Armadillos, for which her daughter Jocelyn is a member.

Along with their new team manager Laurie, they show up for practice, Florine tries to talk Beth into think of other ways to get the money, but Beth convinces her that she's still capable of playing and appoints her as starting lineup. Beth then names the team the “Hot Flashes". At the Post office where Beth's husband Lawrence is the Postmaster, Beth puts up posters for the event while the church Secretary Kayla Rash, whose daughter Millie is one of the Lady Armadillos, assumes the church will receive the money and split half of it with the School's marching band. Beth tells her the proceeds are going to the mobile unit. Kayla tries to convince Beth otherwise, but Beth stands with her choice.

Beth then asks Paul Lazarini, a veterinarian who lost his license for committing a minor felony and a friend of Tess to coach the team, to which he agrees. The team starts off rough with infighting among Clementine and Roxie, but Paul manages to get all of them to stop and reminds all of them to use their innate abilities and to use it to their advantage. He even manages to get them more focused with playing. Roxie designs the team's uniforms which Ginger prints up. Roxie then goes to her friend Roy and asks him to serve as Referee for their games as he has taken it up as a second job due to money being tight for him.

Beth later discovers that no one's betting in the pool and that they have less than $200. While meeting with the others and telling them about these new problems, Beth tells them that she doesn't know if her marriage is good. Just then Millie and her friends come by and deliver backhanded complements to them.

The first game has very few spectators and the betting pools now has $400. Paul convinces them to go and play and tells them that his Aunt died of Breast Cancer as her town didn't have a mobile unit to treat her. Roy is unable to referee the game due to food poisoning, but the Hot Flashes manage to score 18 points, despite losing to the Lady Armadillos who score 37, as well Clementine pulling a muscle and some harassment from the Lady Armadillos' coach Slaughter, who is also one of her ex-husbands. As the Hot flashes leave, Millie lies by saying that Ginger tried to feel her up.

As Kayla and Millie leave, Kayla gives Beth a back handed complement and makes a homophobic insult about Ginger, who is a closeted lesbian. Beth then gets into an argument with them, with Kayla saying that Millie has followed and respects the bible. Beth rebukes them by telling them that Millie and another boy were making out at the miniature golf course a week earlier and blackmails them to not insult Ginger, or she'll put it on Facebook. Kayla then insults Beth and says the Hot flashes are a bad influence and believes that everyone in town will listen to her instead of Beth.

As Beth does some more practicing for the other games, Lawrence believes she would by tired of this, but Jocelyn is sure that the Hot Flashes are taking these games and the donations seriously. One day, when Beth comes home, she discovers a hair pin that doesn't belong to her or Jocelyn in Lawrence's truck and believes that he's having an affair. When he comes home, he denies it and says something misogynistic to her. When Jocelyn comes home, she's angry at Beth for listening to her phone calls, which is how she found out about the golf course incident. Even though Beth wasn't eavesdropping to get Millie grounded and says that Millie deserved it for what she did to Ginger, Jocelyn's teammates are barely speaking to her.

At game 2, the Hot Flashes are more focused and are no longer infighting. There's also $1,500 in the betting pool. Roy has recovered from his food poisoning and manages to let the Hot Flashes get away with dirty techniques, which makes Kayla angry. Millie attempts to insult Clementine, only for Clementine to insult her back. Coach Slaughter also threatens Roy for allowing the Hot Flashes to get away with their dirty playing. The Hot Flashes then win 39 to 38.

While celebrating their win at a local bar, Paul notices that Lawrence has left. Beth tells Paul that ever since the Post Office had to lay off several workers, Lawrence has been working overtime every night. Roxie and the others convince her to go down and temp him with a "special delivery". A newspaper reporter comes by for Photos and Clementine offers a story on how the team got started as Ginger tells them that she sold her pickup truck and got them some money.

Beth asks Roxie to drop her off at the Post Office so she can visit Lawrence. When Beth visits, she hears Kayla and discovers that Lawrence is having an affair with her. The next morning, Jocelyn is still mad at Beth, while Lawrence says that Beth being with the Hot Flashes makes her feel 18 again and that's how he feels with Kayla. Heartbroken, Beth doesn't want to attend the game. When her teammates show up at her house, they tell her that they didn't know about the affair either. Beth feels that Lawrence will leave her and that she'll be completely alone when Jocelyn goes to college and that she also hoped that playing again would make Lawrence see her the way he used to. However, the other women stand by her. Beth then tells them that the mobile unit ran out of money because she forgot to re-apply. Florine reads the newspaper article on them and the praise they're receiving, telling Beth that she would be quitting on all of them. This gets Beth back on her feet to practice for the last game.

When they arrive at the high school, Slaughter says that the school board has banned the whole team for believing them to be bad influences. Beth decides to go to the school board's meeting the next night. She learns that they were banned from playing due to smoking, bribing Roy, "promoting homosexuality" and "excessive" profanity. Beth looks at the letter and discovers that Kayla filed the complaint. Beth offers to have the team improve their behavior, but the men still refuse. Beth tells them that their wives were high school cheerleaders and called all of them on her way to the meeting and offered them to do a halftime performance. The men call their wives and after hearing that Beth was telling the truth, decide to lift the ban. When Beth comes home, she tells Lawrence not to come to the last game if he wants to continue his affair.

On the day of the last game, Paul tells them that the betting pool has been raised to $25,000, their newspaper interview went viral and that Good Morning America wants to do a pregame interview with one of them. The women vote Roxie to give the interview and she does well. Before the game begins, Beth notices that Jocelyn is still mad at her and that Lawrence hasn't shown up, while Roxie's husband Tito and Ginger's girlfriend Jewel have.

During the halftime performance, Kayla's husband returns, having decided to work back home, while Lawrence shows up near the end of the final quarter, in which Millie trips Beth. During a time-out, Beth notices that Lawrence has shown up while Paul successfully asks Laurie out. When Jocelyn asks Millie why she tripped Beth, Millie says it was accidental. Jocelyn then tells three of her other teammates that Millie was having sex with their boyfriends, causing them to ignore her and play in a new manner. Beth scores the winning shot and reconciles with Jocelyn, while Clementine is now on better terms with Slaughter.

Afterwards, Lawrence tells Beth how proud he is of her, but when she asks why he came so late, she realizes that Kayla left him and kicks him out. Lawrence says that Beth can't make it alone at her age, but Beth tells him that her teammates have been there for her. With the new money, the clinic remains opened.

Six months later, Laurie is working at the clinic and engaged to Paul, while Florine is now the Mayor of Burning Bush. Even though Kayla is still working at the church, her reputation has been destroyed as Millie has gotten herself pregnant. Jocelyn is away at college and Beth reveals that her website has been making a lot of money as she prepares to write about making it alone, showing that she has divorced Lawrence and is doing well for herself.

== Cast ==
- Brooke Shields as Beth Humphrey
- Daryl Hannah as Ginger Peabody
- Wanda Sykes as Florine Clarkston
- Virginia Madsen as Clementine Winks
- Camryn Manheim as Roxie Rosales
- Eric Roberts as Lawrence Humphrey
- Mark Povinelli as Paul Lazarini
- Jessica Rothe as Millie Rash
- Robin Roberts as Herself

At one time, actress Melanie Griffith was associated with the film and was present during the early stages of filming. She was seen at a New Orleans Hornets game with friends Daryl Hannah and Brooke Shields. However, she dropped out due to "creative differences".

== See also ==
- List of basketball films
