= Musical Chairs (film) =

2011 film by Susan Seidelman

- Directed by: Susan Seidelman
- Written by: Marty Madden
- Produced by: Janet Carrus; Joey Dedio; Brian Herskovitz; Marty Madden
- Starring: Leah Pipes; E. J. Bonilla; Priscilla Lopez; Laverne Cox; Auti Angel
- Distributed by: Paladin Films
- Release dates: September 24, 2011 (Woodstock); March 23, 2012 (United States)
- Running time: 102 minutes
- Country: United States
- Language: English
- Box office: $31,478

Musical Chairs is a 2011 American romantic drama dance film directed by Susan Seidelman and starring Leah Pipes, E. J. Bonilla, Auti Angel, Laverne Cox, and Priscilla Lopez. It is about a couple who participates in wheelchair ballroom dancing. The film had been in development for eight years. Musical Chairs premiered at the Woodstock Film Festival on September 24, 2011. It was given a limited theatrical release on March 23, 2012. It later aired on HBO in November 2013.

== Plot ==
In New York City, Armando works part-time at his parents' Puerto Rican restaurant and is also a custodian at a dance studio, where he secretly practices dance moves. He befriends the beautiful Mia Franklin, a dancer who is in a relationship with the studio owner, Daniel. She catches Armando dancing alone, likes what she sees and gives him a few tips. They dance together briefly, but are discovered by Daniel. Trying to avoid an awkward situation, Mia leaves. When Armando realizes that Mia has left her scarf behind, he calls out to her from the studio's second floor window.

On the sidewalk below, Mia turns to cross the street, but is struck by a taxi. The accident renders her a paraplegic, paralyzed from the waist down. Upon learning of this, Daniel jilts her. Armando tries to boost Mia's confidence; he persuades her and other disabled people in the local rehabilitation center, including Nikki, a punky Latina, and Kenny, a wounded Iraq War veteran, to enter a wheelchair ballroom dancing competition where they are paired with able-bodied partners. Despite the opposition of his mother Isabel, Armando and Mia gradually begin a relationship and fall in love, while Armando's uncle Wilfredo falls in love with Chantelle, a disabled trans woman at the rehab center. Before the competition, Isabel, who has been maneuvering to get Armando hooked up with fellow Puerto Rican Rosa, does her best to undermine (even to the point of "casting spells") the relationship between him and Mia. Rosa, however, understands Armando's feelings for Mia and does not interfere.

On the night of the competition, Mia panics when she sees Daniel in the audience watching her, and instead of dancing, she rushes to her dressing room and begins to pack her things. Armando's mother rushes to Mia's dressing room and admits that she was wrong, telling Mia that Armando loves her and encourages her to reunite with Armando and win the competition.

Mia goes to Armando, tells him she loves him, and the two return to the competition and begin to dance. But just as the dance is at its height, Mia falls out of her wheelchair. As the stunned audience watches, Armando triumphantly picks her up and the two complete their dance with Armando holding Mia in his arms. The film ends without our knowing if they have won the competition.

== Cast ==
- Leah Pipes as Mia
- E. J. Bonilla as Armando
- Priscilla Lopez as Isabel
- Jaime Tirelli as Bernardo
- Laverne Cox as Chantelle
- Nelson Landrieu as Wilfredo
- Angelic Zambrana as Rosa
- Morgan Spector as Kenny
- Philip Willingham as Daniel
- Auti Angel as Nikki
- Jerome Preston Bates as Jimmy
- Joey Dedio as Chico

== Release ==
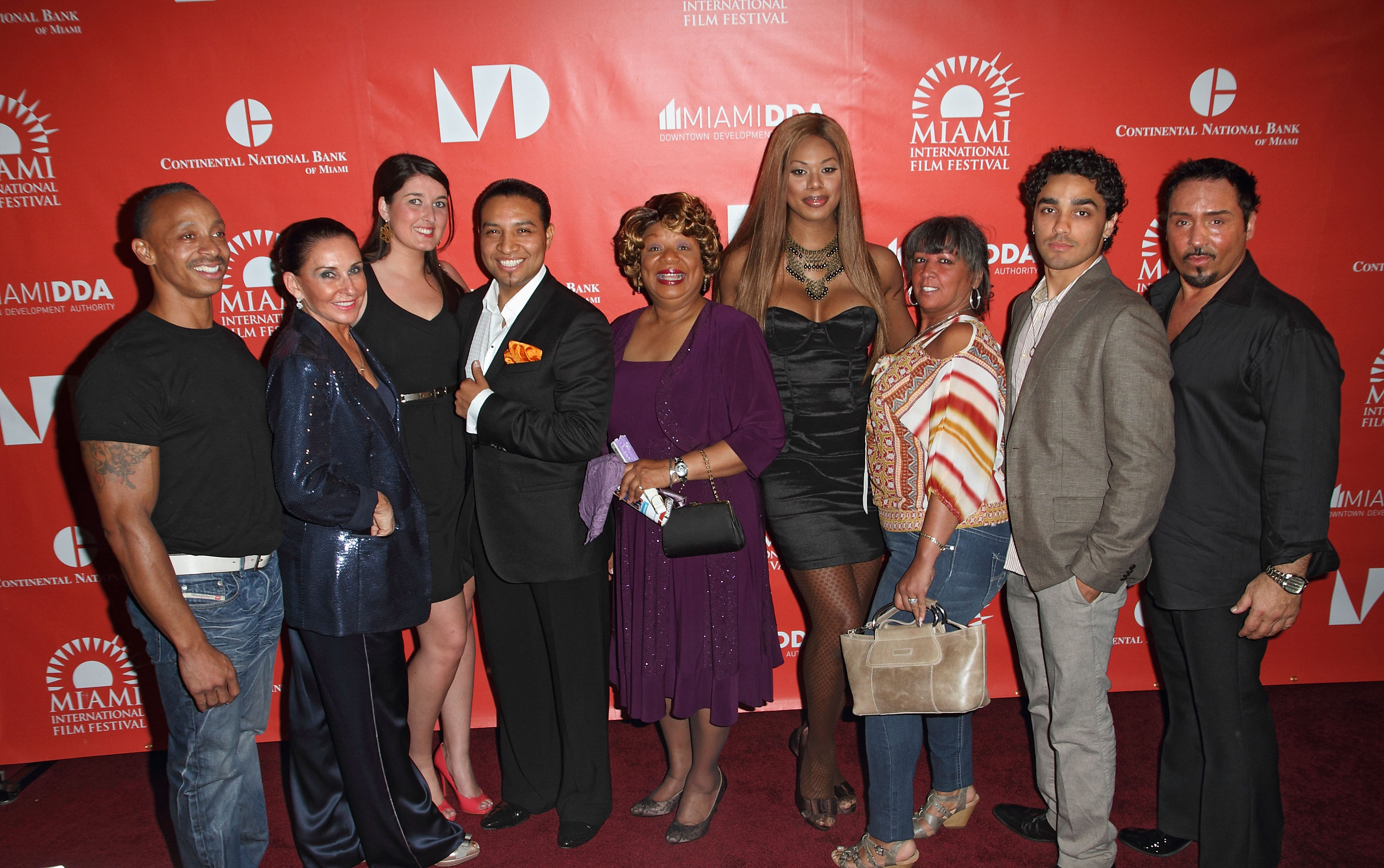
The cast and crew of the film at the 2012 Miami International Film Festival.

Musical Chairs had its world premiere at the Woodstock Film Festival on September 24, 2011. Thereafter, it screened as part of the Westport Cinema Initiative and at Access Chicago on July 19, 2012, as well as the Miami International Film Festival. It screened at the 2012 Hamburg International Film Festival in Germany and the Reel Abilities Film Festival in Fairfax, Virginia.

Musical Chairs was distributed by Paladin Films, who opened the film in limited release on March 23, 2012. The film made $31,478 in its four weeks in theaters.

In an interview with Deadline Hollywood, director Susan Seidelman said that she hoped the film would gain attention through word of mouth, and that the film would be shown to specific target groups, such as Latino Americans in its Florida showings.

On November 15, 2013, Musical Chairs was aired on HBO Latino.

== Critical reception ==
On review aggregate website Rotten Tomatoes, Musical Chairs has an 37% approval score, based on 19 reviews. On Metacritic, the film has a score of 46 out of 100 based on 13 critics, indicating "mixed or average reviews".

Roger Ebert gave the film 2 and ½ stars out of four, calling it a "feel-good romantic fantasy". In the Chicago Tribune, Michael Phillips said" "Most of Musical Chairs settles for being simple, familiar and ineffective, though I suspect it'll warm a few hearts". Sara Stewart of the New York Post said: "Director Susan Seidelman (Desperately Seeking Susan) generates plenty of good will and a few tears, as well as genuine sparks between the two talented leads. But the story never quite gets into the groove".

In a positive review, Rene Rodriguez of the Miami Herald wrote: "As the two leads, the largely unknown Bonilla and Pipes strike up the kind of easy, natural chemistry that makes you forget you're watching pure formula". Writing for The Village Voice, Eric Hynes remarked that Seidelman shows that she "still knows how to capture the chaotic magic of New York". The script received criticisms, with The New York Times' Jeanette Catsoulis bemoaning that it does not delve deeply enough into the world of wheelchair ballroom dancing. The Hollywood Reporter complimented the cast, saying it "has a modest charm perfectly suited to the material".

There was some controversy over the casting of able-bodied actors in the film's lead roles. The director and producers hired disabled performers and dancers in some roles, including Auti Angel, a professional wheelchair dancer and star of reality TV show Push Girls.

== Awards and nominations ==
Musical Chairs was nominated for a Fred & Adele Astaire Award for Outstanding Feature Film in 2012.

On January 16, 2013, Musical Chairs was nominated for a GLAAD Award for Best Film —Limited Release.

The film won several awards at the Massachusetts Independent Film Festival, including for Best Film, Best Actress (Leah Pipes), Best Supporting Actress (Laverne Cox), and Best Director (Susan Seidelman).
