= Tiphany Adams =

American television personality

- Born: March 5, 1983 (age 43); Lodi, California, U.S.
- Occupations: Actress, model
- Notable work: Push Girls

Tiphany Adams (born March 5, 1983) is an American reality television personality, actress, model and speaker.

== Accident ==
In 2000, at the age of 17 she was a passenger in a car struck head on by an intoxicated driver traveling over 130 miles per hour. All were believed to be dead but then first responders heard sounds coming from Adams. They used the jaws of life to reach her and airlift her to the hospital. The others involved in the accident, the drunk driver as well as Adams' two friends, were killed. Adams was diagnosed as a paraplegic with a T10 fracture and L2 movement.

== Early life ==
Adams was raised in the city of Lodi, California. As a young girl, she participated in 4-H. She attended five different schools and was suspended and almost expelled more than once. She knew she was a teenager with major issues who found escape during high school in her theater classes and choir. After the car accident, she wasn't certain if she could pursue acting or modeling in a wheelchair.

Following high school Tiphany studied child development and psychology at San Joaquin Delta College. She has experience teaching in the classroom preschool through sixth grade. Additionally, she is a fitness trainer and has worked as a circuit trainer in Northern California. She relocated to the Los Angeles and has since pursued becoming a model and actor.

== Push Girls ==
In 2012, Sundance Channel announced the creation of the series Push Girls, a reality television series about living with paralysis in Hollywood produced by Gay Rosenthal, which stars Adams among "four dynamic, outspoken and beautiful women" in the Los Angeles area.

== Other projects ==
In addition to her work on Push Girls, Tiphany speaks and advocates publicly on the topics of drunk and distracted driving, LGBT issues, nutrition, wellness and fitness. She is an ambassador for Wish Upon a Teen, an organization that provides resources and opportunities to teenagers dealing with autism or recovering from injury or chronic illness.

A short documentary about Tiphany simply titled Tiphany screened at The Art of Brooklyn Film Festival in 2017.
