= The Prince of Pennsylvania =

1988 film by Ron Nyswaner

- Directed by: Ron Nyswaner
- Written by: Ron Nyswaner
- Produced by: David Brown; Michael Tolkin; Nick Wechsler
- Starring: Fred Ward; Keanu Reeves; Bonnie Bedelia; Amy Madigan
- Cinematography: Frank Prinzi
- Edited by: William Scharf
- Music by: Thomas Newman
- Production company: Columbia Pictures Corporation
- Distributed by: New Line Cinema
- Release dates: September 11, 1988 (Toronto); September 16, 1988 (United States)
- Running time: 93 minutes
- Country: United States
- Language: English
- Budget: $3.5 million
- Box office: $5,415

The Prince of Pennsylvania is a 1988 comedy drama film written and directed by Ron Nyswaner. It stars Fred Ward, Keanu Reeves, Bonnie Bedelia, and Amy Madigan. It premiered at the 1988 Toronto International Film Festival (then the Toronto Festival of Festivals) on September 11, 1988, and received a limited release beginning September 16.

== Plot ==
Rupert Marshetta is the black sheep son of a miner, precocious and misunderstood. He is frustrated with his parents, Gary and Pam, has dropped out of high school and doesn't fit in with the other teens in his town. Rupert is also in love with an older woman, the free-spirited Carla, who operates a run-down roadside ice cream kiosk. Carla also has a young daughter with her ex-boyfriend Joe, a state trooper.

One day Gary tells Rupert he sees himself as the king of Pennsylvania, his wife as the queen, and Rupert as the prince who will inherit his kingdom. Both father and son know that Pam has been sleeping with young miner Jack Sike, who has a newborn baby with his wife.

Gary owns land left by his father, but has no intention of selling it. An increasingly frustrated Rupert, who has no plans to follow his father into mining, schemes with Carla to kidnap his father for $200,000 (the amount the land is worth) and use the ransom money to escape the town and live together.

The duo successfully kidnap Gary and he is held in a trailer. He soon tells his mother, who agrees to go along, as Rupert says she can have half the money so she and Jack can abandon their families and run off together. However, Rupert and Pam learn that Gary sold the land for cash a week earlier, with no information as to where he put the money.

Rupert and Carla take Gary to the mine and hold him near a portable toilet. Rupert eventually thinks the money has been hidden in the toilet, which is chained closed. He prepares dynamite to blow open the toilet, but mine rescue workers and police arrive on the scene warning that the mine’s high levels of methane gas will trigger a massive explosion once the dynamite goes off. Although Gary is able to pull his son to safety, Carla is presumed dead in the blast.

The next day, Gary and Pam have reconciled. Rupert runs away, and is surprised to find that Carla is still alive, but only Joe knows; they, too, have reconciled, and are leaving for Sacramento to be closer to her daughter. A heartbroken Rupert hugs Carla goodbye and says he would rather be handcuffed to a fridge than talk to her ever again. After Carla and Joe drive away, Rupert walks along the road and encounters a lone female biker girl he befriended earlier; he accepts her offer of a ride to Pittsburgh.

== Cast ==
- Fred Ward as Gary Marshetta
- Keanu Reeves as Rupert Marshetta
- Bonnie Bedelia as Pam Marshetta
- Amy Madigan as Carla Headlee
- Jay O. Sanders as Trooper Joe
- Jeff Hayenga as Jack Sike
- Tracey Ellis as Lois Sike

In addition, Joseph de Lisi plays Rupert's younger brother Roger, while Kari Keegan plays the biker girl.

== Production ==
Thomas Newman wrote the music for the film. It was filmed in the coal mine suburbs surrounding Pittsburgh. The scenes for the high school dance were filmed at Chartiers Houston High School in Houston.

== Reception ==
On the review aggregator website Rotten Tomatoes, 14% of 7 critics' reviews are positive, with an average rating of 3.4/10.

Critic Roger Ebert gave it 1.5 stars out of 4. Ebert liked the characters and thought them believable, but excoriated the plot as nonsensical and absurd, particularly the kidnapping scheme. His review concluded, "I had grown intrigued by the characters - especially Madigan's unreconstructed hippie, a woman with a lot of specific and believable details about her. A movie about her would have been interesting. A movie about any of these people might have had a chance, if the filmmakers had retained a shred of sanity."
