= Don't Let Me Drown =

- Poster
- Directed by: Cruz Angeles
- Written by: Maria Topete; Cruz Angeles
- Produced by: Maria Topete; Jay Van Hoy; Lars Knudsen; James Lawler; Ben Howe
- Starring: E. J. Bonilla; Gleendilys Inoa
- Cinematography: Chad Davidson
- Edited by: Andrew Hafitz
- Music by: Daniel Belardinelli
- Release date: January 2009 (Sundance)
- Running time: 99 minutes 102 minutes 105 minutes
- Country: United States
- Language: English

Don't Let Me Drown is a 2009 American romantic drama film written by Maria Topete and Cruz Angeles, directed by Angeles and starring E. J. Bonilla and Gleendilys Inoa.

== Cast ==
- E. J. Bonilla as Lalo
- Gleendilys Inoa as Stephanie
- Damián Alcázar as Ramon
- Yareli Arizmendi as Virginia
- Gina Torres as Diana
- Ricardo Chavira as Dionisio
- Dennis Kellum as Jonathan
- Raúl Castillo as Alex
- Adrian Martinez as Little Joe

== Release ==
The film premiered at the Sundance Film Festival in January 2009.

== Reception ==
The film has an 80% rating on Rotten Tomatoes based on five reviews.

Rob Nelson of Variety gave the film a positive review and wrote, "...the pic draws its romance tenderly and believably..."

Kirk Honeycutt of The Hollywood Reporter and Associated Press also gave the film a positive review, calling it "one of the best film portraits yet of New York City in the aftermath of 9/11..."
