= E. J. Bonilla =

American actor (born 1988)

- Born: Edward Joshua Bonilla; September 8, 1988 (age 37); Brooklyn, New York City, U.S.
- Occupation: Actor
- Years active: 2006–present

Edward Joshua Bonilla (born September 8, 1988) is an American television and film actor. He is best known for his role as Rafe Rivera on Guiding Light.

== Early life ==
Bonilla was born in Brooklyn to Puerto Rican parents. He attended John Ericsson Junior High School 126 in Greenpoint, Brooklyn, where he became involved in poetry, dance, and band, playing the trumpet. He also participated in musical theater while in junior high school and high school. Bonilla attended high school for Environmental Studies. He first became interested in acting in the ninth-grade, when he was cast as Danny Zuko in a performance of Grease. He graduated from high school in 2006 and then attended Bard College.

== Career ==
His first role was a non-union commercial for a Hilary Duff film called Raise Your Voice. After graduating from high school, he went on to originate the role of Rafe, Natalia Rivera Aitoro son, on Guiding Light in May 2007.

Bonilla starred in the independent film Musical Chairs. It is a story of a couple (played by Bonilla and actress Leah Pipes) who enter a wheelchair ballroom dancing competition after the girl is disabled in a traffic accident. The film was released on March 23, 2012.

Bonilla received an Imagen Award nomination for his performance as "Dexter," a former high school basketball player whose best days are behind him, in Joshua Sanchez's directorial debut, Four. The film was released on September 13, 2013.

=== Awards ===
Award	Date	Film/show	Category	Result
28th Annual Imagen Awards	August 16, 2013	Four	Best Actor/Supporting Actor - Feature Film	Nominated
Los Angeles Film Festival	June 24, 2012	Four	Best Performance in the Narrative Competition (Ensemble Cast)	Won
36th Daytime Emmy Awards	August 30, 2009	Guiding Light	Outstanding Younger Actor in a Drama Series	Nominated

== Filmography ==
=== Feature films ===
Year	Title	Role	Notes
2009	Don't Let Me Drown	Lalo	
2011	Yelling to the Sky	Rob Rodriguez	
2011	The Mortician	Noah	
2011	Mamitas	Jordin Juarez	
2011	Musical Chairs	Armando	
2013	The House That Jack Built	Jack	
2013	Four	Dexter	Nominated – Imagen Award
2019	Gemini Man	Marino	
2019	The Kitchen	Gonzalo Martinez	
2023	The Exorcist: Believer	Father Maddox	
2024	In Our Blood	Danny Martinez	

=== Television ===
Year	Title	Role	Notes
2006	The Ron Clark Story	Hispanic Kid	Television film
2006	Law & Order: Criminal Intent	Fraco	Episode: "Watch"
2007–2009	Guiding Light	Raphael "Rafe" Rivera	158 episodes Nominated – Daytime Emmy Award
2009	Law & Order	Carlos	Episode: "Bailout"
2009	Bored to Death	Francisco	Episode: "The Case of the Stolen Skateboard"
2010	Cold Case	Ronnie Tavares '93	Episode: "Shattered"
2011	Blue Bloods	Julio	Episode: "Dedication"
2012	The Big C	Scott	Episode: "What's Your Story?"
2012–2013	Revenge	Marco Romero	4 episodes
2013	Shameless	Jesus	Episode: "Civil Wrongs"
2015–2016	Unforgettable	Denny Padilla	Main cast
2017	The Long Road Home	Shane Aguero	8 episodes
2017	Madam Secretary	Juan-Luis Moreno	1 episode
2018	Insecure	Beat Crew Guy	2 episodes
2018	Bull	Gabriel Almonte	6 episodes
2022–present	The Old Man	Agent Raymond Waters	
2024	Chicago P.D.	Officer Danny Alvarado	Episode: "Safe Harbor"
