= Wendell Pierce =

American actor (born 1962)

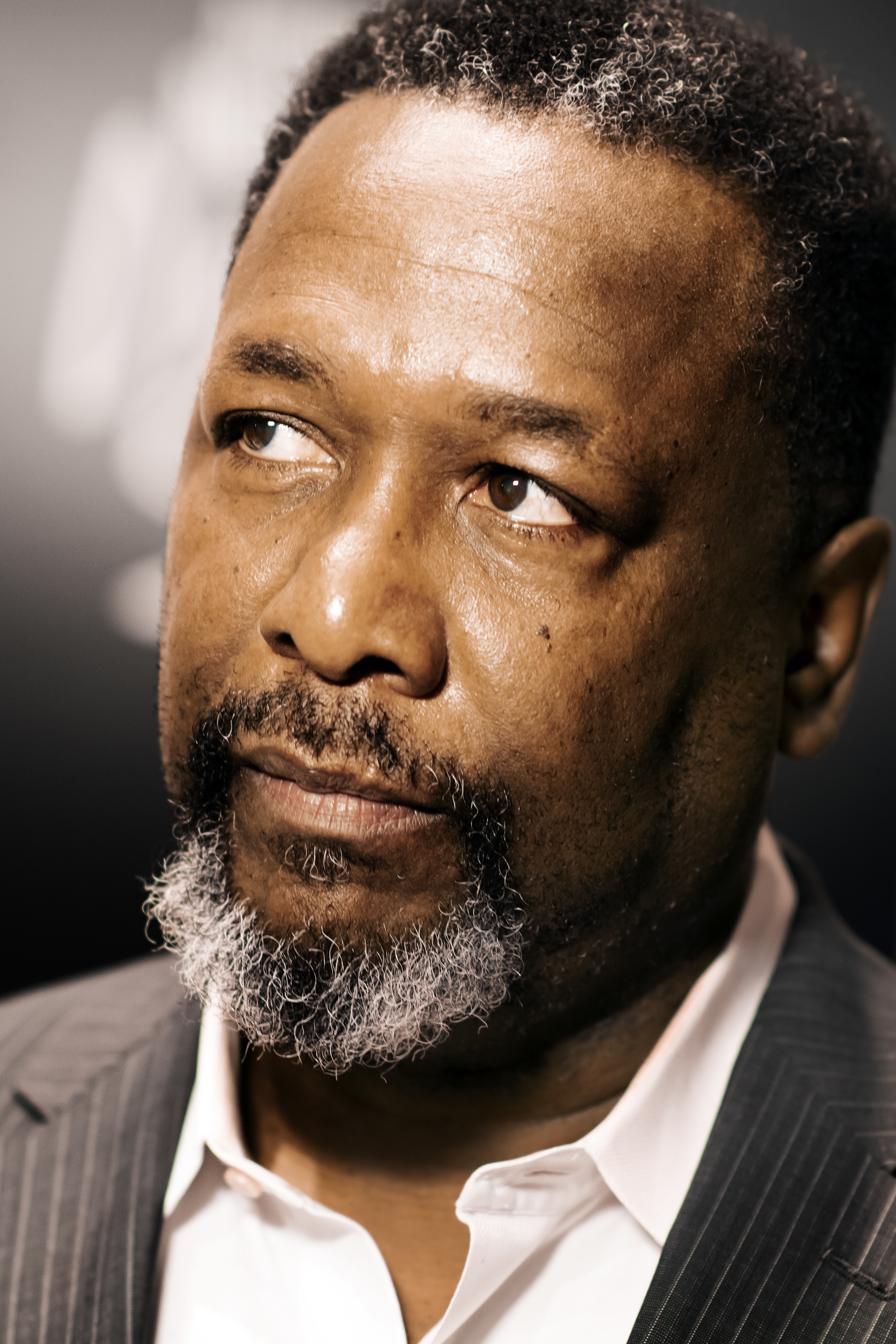
- Pierce in 2022
- Born: Wendell Edward Pierce; December 8, 1962 (age 63); New Orleans, Louisiana, U.S.
- Education: Juilliard School (BFA)
- Occupations: Actor; businessman
- Years active: 1985–present

Wendell Edward Pierce (born December 8, 1962) is an American actor and businessman. Having trained at Juilliard School, Pierce rose to prominence as a character actor of stage and screen. He first gained recognition portraying Detective Bunk Moreland in the HBO drama series The Wire from 2002 to 2008.

Pierce's other notable television roles include the trombonist Antoine Batiste in Treme (2010–2013), James Greer in Tom Clancy's Jack Ryan (2018–2023), the attorney Robert Zane in Suits (2013–2019), and Clarence Thomas in Confirmation (2016). He earned Independent Spirit Awards nominations for his film roles in Four (2012) and Burning Cane (2019), on which he also served as a producer. Other notable film roles include Malcolm X (1992), Waiting to Exhale (1995), Ray (2004), Selma (2014), The Gift (2015), and Clemency (2019).

Pierce made his Broadway debut in John Pielmeier's 1985 play The Boys of Winter, followed by Caryl Churchill's Serious Money in 1988. As a theatrical producer, he earned a nomination for the Tony Award for Best Play for August Wilson's Radio Golf (2007), then won for Bruce Norris's Clybourne Park (2012). He performed the lead role of Willy Loman in the revival of Death of a Salesman on the West End in London in 2019 and on Broadway in New York in 2022, for which he earned nominations for the Laurence Olivier Award and Tony Award for Best Leading Actor in a Play.

== Early life and education ==
Wendell Pierce was born in New Orleans, Louisiana, one of three sons of a teacher and a decorated World War II veteran who worked as a maintenance engineer. His father's segregated Army unit helped Marines win the Battle of Saipan in 1944. Pierce has said of his father's experience:

My father fought in World War II, loved this country when this country wasn't loving him back. My father fought in Saipan, came back, was awarded medals and were denied them by a white officer who said, "no, not you, not your unit." There was nothing that this country was doing for him or to him that would make him love this country. And in spite of all of that, he gave us a love for country because of the values that we are aspiring to as a nation.

Pierce was raised in the black middle-class community of Pontchartrain Park, the first African-American postwar suburb. His father, along with many other black veterans, moved there after returning from the war. The neighborhood was wiped out during Hurricane Katrina in 2005, including Pierce's family home, which was flooded by 14 feet (4.3 m) of water.

Pierce graduated in 1981 from both Benjamin Franklin High School and the New Orleans Center for Creative Arts (most NOCCA students attend traditional secondary school in the mornings and the arts school in the afternoons). In 1981, he was named a Presidential Scholar of the Arts. As a young actor, he appeared in The Winter's Tale at the Tulane Shakespeare Festival. He produced and hosted Think About It, a youth-themed talk show, for the local NBC affiliate station, and also hosted a weekly jazz show on WYLD-FM Radio called Extensions from Congo Square.

Pierce then attended the Juilliard School's Drama Division from 1981 to 1985, graduating as a member of Group 14 with a Bachelor of Fine Arts. In May 2023, Pierce received an honorary doctorate from the Juilliard School.

== Career ==
Pierce made his television debut on the HBO anthology series Vietnam War Story in the third episode, "The Pass", along with Ching Valdes-Aran, Tony Becker, and Merritt Butrick. His second television role was Dr. Wolff in two episodes of The Equalizer (1988, 1989).

Pierce worked on the HBO dramas The Wire and Treme. When first cast in The Wire, he and his castmates doubted the show would be a hit: "I remember the first time we all sat around and watched the pilot. We all turned to each other and said, 'Man, I don't think this shit is going anywhere.'" For his role in Treme, Pierce learned to play trombone, though he relied on "sound double" Stafford Agee of the Rebirth Brass Band. Agee played off-camera for Pierce, syncing his trombone with Pierce's motions for authenticity.

In 2012, he played J. Jenks in The Twilight Saga: Breaking Dawn – Part 2.

Pierce was nominated for an Independent Spirit Award for Best Male Lead for his portrayal of Joe, a married and closeted gay man who steps out on his family with a young white man he met online, in Four. The film was released in September 2013, around the same time that The Michael J. Fox Show debuted on NBC, in which Pierce played Michael J. Fox's character's boss. The show was canceled five months later.

Pierce wrote and published a book in 2015, The Wind in the Reeds: A Storm, A Play, and the City That Would Not Be Broken on his experiences with the Beckett play Waiting for Godot, and the flooding of New Orleans in 2005.

From 2015 to 2017, Pierce starred alongside Matthew Perry and Thomas Lennon in CBS's revival of the sitcom The Odd Couple, playing the role of Teddy.

When Mike Henry stepped down as the voice of Cleveland Brown on Family Guy in June 2020, in light of the George Floyd protests, Pierce launched a campaign to become Henry's replacement. He lost the role to YouTube personality Arif Zahir.

=== Stage ===
Pierce has been in numerous stage productions. He was lauded for his performance as Holt Fay in Queenie at the John F. Kennedy Center. He has performed on Broadway in staged productions of The Piano Lesson, Serious Money, and The Boys of Winter. He has performed off-Broadway in The Cherry Orchard (for which he was nominated for a VIV Award for Lead Actor), Waiting for Godot (which was set on a New Orleans rooftop post-Hurricane Katrina), and Broke-ology performed at Lincoln Center for the Performing Arts. Other performances include Cymbeline (at The Public Theater), The Good Times Are Killing Me, Two Gentlemen of Verona, Tis Pity She's a Whore, and Ms. Ever's Boys performed at the ACT Theatre.

Pierce is also a theater producer, and produced the Broadway show Clybourne Park. The show was nominated for four Tony Awards and won the Tony Award for Best Play in 2012. In 2015, Pierce returned to the stage to star in the Billie Holiday Theatre production of Jackie Alexander's Brothers from the Bottom in New York.

In 2019, Pierce starred in the acclaimed Arthur Miller play Death of a Salesman at the Young Vic Theatre in London and its successful transfer to the West End. For this performance, he received a nomination for the Olivier Award for Best Actor. The show made its Broadway transfer in 2022, returning with Pierce, Sharon D. Clarke, and Andre De Shields. In December 2022, on one of the nights of its production run, a woman disrupted the beginning of Act 2, shouting at the stage. Pierce tried to calm her down from the stage. She was eventually escorted out of the building by authorities and the play's producers issued a statement saying, "We're grateful to the entire team at the Hudson Theatre for working together to resolve the situation and resume the performance as quickly as possible." Videos of the event and Pierce's attempts to reason with the patron went viral online. Pierce received a 2023 Tony Award nomination for the production.

=== Radio ===
In 2009, Pierce became the host of the nationally syndicated, Peabody Award-winning radio program Jazz at Lincoln Center, which featured live recordings from Jazz at Lincoln Center's House of Swing.

=== Music ===
In 2016, Pierce started appearing on several albums recorded in New Orleans. He recorded the song "Make America Great Again" with Delfeayo Marsalis in 2016, one song with Kermit Ruffins on Irvin Mayfield's 2017 album A Beautiful World, and one with Stanton Moore on his 2017 album With You In Mind.

In 2020, Pierce recorded "The Ever Fonky Lowdown" with Wynton Marsalis.

== Business and philanthropy ==
Pierce considers himself a "true capitalist" and a "classic entrepreneur".

In 2013, Fast Company named Pierce one of the "100 Most Creative People in Business".

=== Nonprofit work ===
Pierce started the nonprofit Pontchartrain Park Community Development Corp. to build new affordable solar and geothermal homes in the area for families displaced by Hurricane Katrina.

=== Sterling Farms ===
In 2012, inspired in part by Michelle Obama's initiative to bring more supermarkets to food deserts where residents lack easy access to fresh produce, Pierce, along with partners Troy Henry and James Hatchett, started Sterling Farms, a chain of grocery stores in the Ninth Ward of New Orleans. The chain closed 13 months later. Sterling Farms also had a convenience store division, Sterling Express. The stores were named after Sterling Henry, Troy Henry's father, who ran a pharmacy for about 40 years in the Lower Ninth Ward.

== Personal life ==
Pierce describes himself as "tri-coastal", splitting his time among Los Angeles, New York City, and New Orleans. He is a New Orleans Saints supporter, and locals have nicknamed him "Saints Wendell". He is also an avid supporter of St. Patrick's Athletic FC. He is Catholic.

Pierce was a vocal supporter of Hillary Clinton and was on the board of Alliance for a Healthier Generation, a campaign created by the Clinton Foundation. He attended the 2012 Democratic National Convention, was one of President Barack Obama's top campaign fundraisers in 2012, and once escorted Gwen Ifill to a White House state dinner. Pierce announced the ceremonial delegate casting for Louisiana at the 2024 Democratic National Convention.

On May 15, 2016, Pierce was arrested and charged with simple battery for an alleged attack against a female Bernie Sanders supporter outside Atlanta Loews Hotel. He was booked and released on $1,000 bond from Fulton County Jail. Pierce subsequently completed a pretrial diversion program, including counseling and community service, resulting in dismissal of the charge.

== Acting credits ==
=== Film ===
Year	Title	Role	Notes
1986	The Money Pit	Paramedic	
1989	Casualties of War	MacIntire	
1989	Family Business	Prosecutor	
1990	A Matter of Degrees	Wells Dennard	
1991	A Rage in Harlem	Louis	
1992	Malcolm X	Ben Thomas	
1993	Manhattan Murder Mystery	Policeman	
1994	It Could Happen to You	Bo Williams	
1995	Bye Bye Love	Hector	
1995	Hackers	Secret Service Agent Dick Gill	
1995	Waiting to Exhale	Michael Davenport	
1996	Sleepers	Eddie "Little Caesar" Robinson	
1996	Get on the Bus	Wendell	
1998	Bulworth	Fred	
1999	The 24 Hour Woman	Roy LaBelle	
1999	Abilene	Reverend Tillis	
2001	The Gilded Six Bits	Otis D. Slimmons	Short
2002	The Date	Naive Man	Short
2002	Brown Sugar	Simon	
2003	The Fighting Temptations	Reverend Lewis	
2004	A Hole in One	Dan	
2004	Land of Plenty	Henry	
2004	Ray	Wilbur Brassfield	
2006	Stay Alive	Detective Thibodeaux	
2007	I Think I Love My Wife	Sean	
2007	Pariah	Arthur	Short
2009	Beyond All Boundaries	Sergeant Thomas McPhatter (voice)	Short
2009	The Storm Inside	The Narrator	Documentary
2010	Night Catches Us	David Gordon	
2010	Love Ranch	Naasih Mohammed	
2010	The Big Uneasy	Himself (narration)	Documentary
2011	The Mortician	Wendell Simms	
2011	Horrible Bosses	Detective Hagan	
2012	Lay the Favorite	Dave "The Rave"	
2012	Four	Joe	
2012	The Twilight Saga: Breaking Dawn – Part 2	J. Jenks	
2013	Parker	Carlson	
2013	Möbius	Bob	
2014	Foreclosure	Virgil	
2014	Elsa & Fred	Armande	
2014	Selma	Hosea Williams	
2015	Mary Lou Williams: The Lady Who Swings the Band	Andy Kirk (voice)	Documentary
2015	Runaway Hearts	Paul	
2015	The Gift	Detective Mills	
2015	The Runner	Frank Legrand	
2016	Bad Moms	Principal Daryl Burr	
2017	The Forever Tree	Dr. Willow	Short
2017	Rodents of Unusual Size	The Narrator	Documentary
2018	Piercing	Doctor	
2018	One Last Thing	Dylan Derringer	
2019	Clemency	Jonathan Williams	
2019	Burning Cane	Reverend Tillman	Also producer
2022	Don't Hang Up	Chris Daniels	
2025	Thunderbolts*	Congressman Gary	
2025	Highest 2 Lowest	Gabe	
2025	Superman	Perry White	
2026	Jack Ryan: Ghost War	James Greer	
2026	They Fight	Slim	
TBA	King of the South †	Claude Miller	Post-production
TBA	Jabari's People †		Post-production

=== Television ===
Year	Title	Role	Notes
1987	Vietnam War Story	French	Episode: "The Pass" (S1.E3)
1988–1989	The Equalizer	Dr. Wolff	Episodes: "The Last Campaign", "Starfire"
1989	A Man Called Hawk	Derrick West	Episode: "Never My Love"
1990	Capital News	Conrad White	Main cast
1991	I'll Fly Away	Charles	Episode: "Coming Home"
1991	The 10 Million Dollar Getaway	Parnell "Stacks" Edwards	TV movie
1992	General Motors Playwrights Theater	Sergeant Kelly	Episode: "Avenue Z Afternoon"
1992	Law & Order	Chief Ola-Gimju Nwaka	Episode: "Consultation"
1992	Unnatural Pursuits	Cabbie	Episode: "I Don't Do Cuddles"
1993	Strapped	District Attorney	TV movie
1994	Last Days of Russell	Walter	TV movie
1995	Law & Order	Jerome Bryant	Episode: "Rage"
1995	New York News	Jesus	Episode: "The Using Game"
1996	New York Undercover	Dr. Anthony Fisher	Episode: "Bad Blood"
1996	Never Give Up: The Jimmy V Story	John Saunders	TV movie
1997	The Advocate's Devil	Justin	TV movie
1996–1997	Moloney	District Attorney Calvin Patterson	Recurring cast
1997	413 Hope	Taffy	Episode: "Pilot" & "Fatherhood"
1997–1999	The Gregory Hines Show	Carl Stevenson	Main cast
1998	Sports Theater with Shaquille O'Neal	Assistant Coach	Episode: "Scrubs"
1998–2000	The Brian Benben Show	Kevin La Rue	Main cast
1999	The Expert	Dr. Worseley	Episode: "Pilot"
1999	Law & Order	Mr. Wade	Episode: "Disciple"
1999	MTV Downtown	Limo driver	Episode: "Limo", credited as Edward Pierce
2000	God, the Devil and Bob	Mike (voice)	Episodes: "In the Beginning" & "Date from Hell"
2000	Third Watch	Officer Conrad 'Candyman' Jones	Recurring cast (season 1)
2000	City of Angels	Norbert Grimly	Episode: "Straight Flush"
2001	My Wife and Kids	Dr. Boucher	Episode: "Pilot"
2000–2001	The Weber Show	Wendell Simms	Main cast
2002	Girlfriends	Anthony Jackson	Episode: "Childs in Charge"
2002–2008	The Wire	Detective William "Bunk" Moreland	Main cast
2004	Judging Amy	Harry Benton	Episode: "Sins of the Father"
2004	Law & Order	Roger Porter	Episode: "Gunplay"
2004	Mitchellville	–	TV movie
2005–2006	Law & Order: Trial by Jury	Dr. Richard Link	Episodes: "The Line" & "Eros in the Upper Eighties"
2006	Close to Home	Sam Carter	Episode: "Prodigal Son"
2007	The Wire: The Chronicles	Detective William "Bunk" Moreland	Episode: "2000: Bunk and McNulty"
2007	Life Support	"Slick"	TV movie
2007–2008	Numb3rs	William Bradford	Recurring cast (season 3), guest (season 5)
2008	Women's Murder Club	Bill Schroeder	Episode: "Father's Day"
2008	In Plain Sight	Dr. Warren McBride / Warren Morris	Episode: "It Doesn't Live Here Anymore"
2008	House of Payne	Jeffrey Lucas	Recurring cast (season 4)
2009	Fear Itself	Wiilbur Orwell	Episode: "Something with Bite"
2009	Hawthorne	Michael Schilling	Episode: "Trust Me"
2009	Drop Dead Diva	Neal David	Episode: "Grayson's Anatomy"
2010	Tim & Eric Awesome Show	Detective	Episode: "Re-Animated"
2010–2013	Treme	Antoine Batiste	Main cast
2013–2014	The Michael J. Fox Show	Harris Green	Main cast
2013–2019	Suits	Robert Zane	Recurring cast (seasons 2–9)
2014–2015	Ray Donovan	Ronald Keith	Recurring cast (season 2), guest (season 3)
2015	The Night Shift	Walt	Episode: "Moving On"
2015–2017	The Odd Couple	Teddy	Main cast
2016	Grease Live!	Coach Calhoun	TV movie
2016	Confirmation	Clarence Thomas	TV movie
2016	Pickle and Peanut	Dr. Craig (voice)	Episode: "Night Shift/Scalped"
2017	Archer	Verl (voice)	Episode: "Archer Dreamland: Jane Doe"
2017–2020	Chicago P.D.	Alderman Ray Price	Recurring cast (seasons 5–6), guest (season 7)
2018	Unsolved	Detective Lee Tucker	Recurring cast
2018–2023	Jack Ryan	James Greer	Main cast
2021	The Watch	Death (voice)	Main cast
2022–2023	Eureka!	Sandy (voice)	Recurring cast
2023	Accused	Detective Trent Douglas	Episode: "Kendall's Story"
2023–2026	Power Book III: Raising Kanan	Ishmael "Snaps" Henry	Recurring cast (seasons 3–5)
2024–present	Elsbeth	C.W. Wagner	Main cast
2025	Harley Quinn	Lex Luthor (voice)	2 episodes
TBA	The People v. Gorilla Grodd †	Perry White	Main role; Filming

=== Theatre ===
Year	Title	Role	Notes
1985	The Boys of Winter	Radio Voice / Flight Captain	Biltmore Theatre, Broadway
1987	The Two Gentlemen of Verona	Outlaw 2	Delacorte Theatre, Off-Broadway
1987	The Witch of Edmonton	Performer	Shakespeare Theatre Company
1988	Serious Money	Merrison / Nigel / T.K.	Royale Theatre, Broadway
1991	The Good Times Are Killing Me	Mr. Willis	Second Stage Theater, Off-Broadway
1992	'Tis Pity She's a Whore	Friar Bonaventura	The Public Theater, Off-Broadway
1995	A Midsummer Night's Dream	Nick Bottom	La Jolla Playhouse
1999	Tartuffe	Cleante	Delacorte Theatre, Off-Broadway
2006	Fences	Jim Bono	Pasadena Playhouse
2006	Waiting for Godot	Vladimir	Classical Theatre of Harlem
2007	Radio Golf	Producer only	Cort Theatre, Broadway
2009	Broke-ology	William King	Mitzi Newhouse Theater, Off-Broadway
2012	Clybourne Park	Producer only	Walter Kerr Theatre, Broadway
2016	Cost of Living	Eddie	Williamstown Theatre Festival
2018	Some Old Black Man	Calvin Jones	59E59 Theaters, Off-Broadway
2019	Death of a Salesman	Willy Loman	Piccadilly Theatre, West End
2022	Death of a Salesman	Willy Loman	Hudson Theatre, Broadway
2026	Othello	Othello	Shakespeare Theatre Company

== Awards and nominations ==
Year	Award	Category	Work	Result	Ref.
2004	NAACP Image Awards	Outstanding Actor in a Drama Series	The Wire	Nominated	
2007	Tony Award	Best Play	Radio Golf	Nominated	
2012	Tony Award	Best Play	Clybourne Park	Won	
2013	Independent Spirit Award	Best Male Lead	Four	Nominated	
2019	Evening Standard Theatre Award	Best Actor	Death of a Salesman	Nominated	
2020	Independent Spirit Award	Best Supporting Male	Burning Cane	Nominated	
2020	Laurence Olivier Award	Best Actor	Death of a Salesman	Nominated	
2023	Tony Award	Best Actor in a Play	Death of a Salesman	Nominated	

== See also ==
- African-American Tony nominees and winners
