= Mia Schaikewitz =

American actress

- Born: May 23, 1978 (age 48); Atlanta, Georgia USA
- Education: University of Florida
- Notable work: Push Girls
- Height: 1.778 m (5 ft 10 in)

Mia Schaikewitz (/ˈʃaɪkəwɪts/; born May 23, 1978) is an American TV personality and spokesperson for disability advocacy. She starred in the 2012 reality series Push Girls on the Sundance Channel.

== Early life and career ==
A competitive swimmer at the time, Schaikewitz became paralyzed from the waist down "over the course of a half-day" after an arteriovenous malformation (AVM) ruptured in her spinal cord when she was 15. She went on to graduate with a degree from the University of Florida and then moved to Los Angeles where she developed a career in graphic design and branding. In 2012, she decided to return to the sport of competitive swimming after 17 years, as documented in Season 1 of the show Push Girls.

== Awards and nominations ==
- In 2013, Push Girls won the Critics' Choice Best Reality Series award.
