= Mamitas =

- Directed by: Nicholas Ozeki
- Written by: Nicholas Ozeki
- Produced by: Andrew Daniel Wells; Adam Renehan
- Starring: E. J. Bonilla; Veronica Diaz Carranza; Jennifer Esposito; Jesse Garcia; Joaquim de Almeida; Pedro Armendáriz Jr.
- Cinematography: Andrew Davis
- Edited by: Melissa McCoy
- Music by: Joseph Trapanese
- Production company: Right Brain Films
- Distributed by: Screen Media Films
- Release dates: June 1, 2011 (Los Angeles Film Festival); April 27, 2012 (limited)
- Running time: 109 minutes
- Country: United States
- Language: English

Mamitas is a 2011 American coming-of-age drama film written and directed by Nicholas Ozeki, starring E. J. Bonilla, Veronica Diaz Carranza, Jennifer Esposito, Jesse Garcia, Joaquim de Almeida and Pedro Armendáriz Jr. It is an adaptation of Ozeki's 2007 short film of the same name.

== Cast ==
- E. J. Bonilla as Jordin Juarez
- Veronica Diaz Carranza as Felipa Talia
- Jennifer Esposito as Miss Ruiz
- Jesse Garcia as Hector Juarez
- Joaquim de Almeida as Professor Alexander Viera
- Pedro Armendáriz Jr. as Ramon 'Tata' Donicio
- Josue Aguirre as Santos
- Maynor Alvarado as Jordin's Friend
- Jorge Borrelli as Dr. Allison
- Kimberly Burke as Kika
- Elena Campbell-Martinez as Teacher
- Maximillian Decker as Dominic
- Carl Donelson as Big Sexy
- Michael Esparza as Christian
- Alex Fernandez as Alvaro Juarez
- Adriana Fricke as Magdalena Juarez
- Glenn Taranto as Jimmy
- Heather Tom as Casandra
- Julia Vera as Miss Palencia
- Jose Yenque as Julio
- Teresa Castillo as Maria (uncredited)

== Release ==
The film premiered at the LA Film Festival in June 2011.

== Reception ==
Mark Olsen of the Los Angeles Times stated: "Unbalanced storytelling aside, Ozeki wisely works to keep the film focused on his actors, a smart move considering their live-wire charm." John Hazelton of Screen International called the film "likeable if rambling" and praised the "very natural" and "quite touching" performances of Bonilla and Diaz Carranza. Robert Koehler of Variety wrote: "Every bit as cliched as it sounds, pic offers a dramatically crude, overly familiar take on the bad-boy-turned-good story."
