= Smithereens (film) =

1982 American drama film

- Theatrical release poster
- Directed by: Susan Seidelman
- Written by: Peter Askin; Ron Nyswaner; Susan Seidelman
- Produced by: Joanne Gross; Susan Seidelman
- Starring: Susan Berman; Brad Rijn; Richard Hell
- Cinematography: Chirine El Khadem
- Edited by: Susan Seidelman
- Distributed by: New Line Cinema
- Release date: September 11, 1982
- Running time: 89 minutes
- Country: United States
- Language: English

Smithereens is a 1982 American drama film directed by Susan Seidelman and starring Susan Berman, Brad Rijn (billed as "Brad Rinn"), and Richard Hell. The film follows a narcissistic, young woman from New Jersey who comes to New York City to join the waning punk subculture, only to find that it has gravitated towards Los Angeles; in order to pay her way across country, she engages in a number of parasitic relationships, shifting her allegiances to new "friends" in an ongoing effort to ultimately endear herself to someone who will finance her desired lifestyle.

Smithereens marked the debut of Oscar-nominated screenwriter Ron Nyswaner (Philadelphia) and features a score by The Feelies. It was the first American independent film invited to compete for the Palme d'Or at the 1982 Cannes Film Festival. Smithereens is a precursor to Desperately Seeking Susan, Seidelman's next film; both films share similar themes of female identity and self-reinvention.

== Plot ==
Wren is a runaway from New Jersey living in New York City in the hopes of becoming a figure in the punk rock scene, only to find that the movement is now centered in Los Angeles. Wren finds herself relegated to sneaking into the city's remaining punk hot spot, the Peppermint Lounge, to ingratiate herself with the bands that play there, in the hopes that one of them will take her on as a groupie. She also engages in a campaign to litter the city with photocopied pictures of herself bearing the legend "WHO IS THIS?" in an attempt to generate mystique. Although she works part-time at a Xerox shop by day, Wren mostly uses her position there surreptitiously to print her fliers, and she supplements her lifestyle by mugging women in the subway.

Wren runs across Paul, a young man from Montana in the middle of a road trip who has briefly taken up residence in the city before heading to New Hampshire. Although he sleeps in the back of his dilapidated van, Paul has saved enough money to otherwise live comfortably. When Paul expresses interest in Wren, she agrees to date him, but she's emotionally abusive and makes it clear to Paul that she's more interested in the stability he can offer her.

On a date, the couple meet Eric, former member of Smithereens, a one-hit-wonder punk group from a decade earlier. Though unemployed and living in the apartment of another punk named Billy, Eric professes to be putting together a new group that will be headed to Los Angeles. Wren leaves Paul to move in with Eric, but she's forced to leave after a confrontation with a nameless, blonde woman who also lives in the apartment.

Returning to her apartment, Wren discovers that her roommates have fled in her absence and that her landlady has locked her out. Wren visits her brother and sister-in-law in an attempt to get a loan, but they decline on the grounds that Wren has cheated them in the past. With nowhere to go, Wren returns to Paul and coaxes him into helping her break into her old apartment to retrieve her things. The two resume an uneasy relationship, and Paul allows Wren to sleep in the back of his van at night.

Eric finds Wren and tells her that they are set to go to Los Angeles, but that they need money to afford transportation and food en route. With Wren's help, Eric robs a wealthy man, Ed, at gunpoint after trapping him in a taxi. Finding that they've made enough money to go to Los Angeles, Eric sends Wren to collect her things from Paul's van. Returning to Eric's apartment, Wren learns from Billy that Eric has taken all of their money and gone to Los Angeles by himself. Confronting the nameless, blonde woman in the stairwell, Wren learns that she is Eric's wife and that he has a history of picking up vulnerable women to exploit for his own financial gain. Attempting to reunite with Paul, Wren learns that he sold his van to a local pimp and used the money to continue his road trip. Looking inside the van, Wren discovers that Paul left behind a watercolor portrait he'd done of her.

Now homeless, Wren wanders the city until she's propositioned by a man in a convertible. Although she initially dismisses the man's advances, his admonishment that she has nowhere else to go causes her to stop and look back toward his car.

== Cast ==
- Susan Berman as Wren
- Brad Rinn as Paul
- Richard Hell as Eric
- Nada Despotovich as Cecile
- Roger Jett as Billy
- Kitty Summerall as Eric's wife
- Rbynne White as Landlady
- D.J. O'Neill as Ed
- Joel Rooks as Xerox boss

In addition, Chris Noth, in his second credited film role, makes a brief appearance playing a prostitute.

== Production ==
Susan Berman fell off a fire escape on the 44th floor during rehearsal on the fifth day of filming. She broke her ankle and was in a plaster cast for four months, during which filming was delayed.

The police were called after a pedestrian saw Susan Seidelman handing the script supervisor a prop gun and the script supervisor was arrested.

== Reception ==
Janet Maslin of The New York Times wrote "Smithereens gets off to a fast start, thanks to Susan Berman's feisty performance and the vitality with which her story is told...Although willful inactivity seems a crucial part of the characters' way of life, it's carried too far; everyone here stays put a little longer than is believable, particularly Paul, who remains parked by the highway for what feels like weeks, with nothing to do but wait for Wren to appear."

Dave Kehr of the Chicago Reader wrote "Wren, in her self-delusion, manipulativeness, and superficiality, easily ranks as one of the most obnoxious characters in film history, and she exerts a strange fascination."

Film critic Emanuel Levy wrote "Susan Seidelman's feature debut, the first American indie to be shown at the Cannes Film Festival, put New York's East Village sensibility onscreen by examining issues of identity, desire and self-fulfillment from a distinctly female perspective."

On the review aggregator website Rotten Tomatoes, 100% of 10 critics' reviews are positive. On Metacritic it has a score of 72 out of 100 based on reviews from 7 critics, which indicates "generally favorable reviews".

== Home media ==
Before the Criterion Collection DVD/Blu-ray edition, it was released on VHS by Merlin Video in the UK.

== See also ==
- 1982 in music
- 1982 in film
- DIY culture

== Works cited ==
- Seidelman, Susan (2024). "Once Upon A Time On The Lower East Side". Filmmaker. Vol. 32, no. 4. The Gotham Film & Media Institute.
