= Susan Seidelman =

American film director, producer and writer

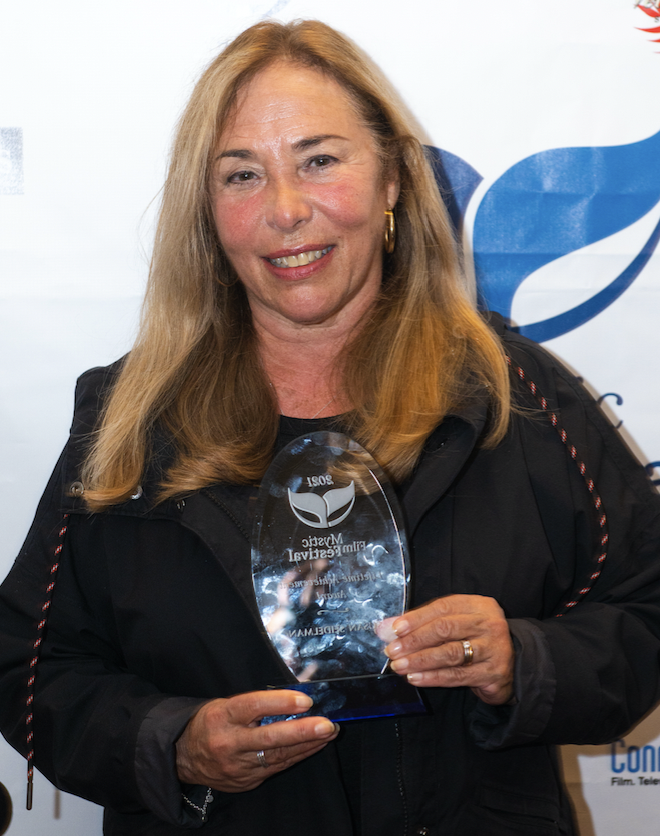
- Seidelman at Mystic Film Festival, 2021
- Born: December 11, 1952 (age 73); Philadelphia, Pennsylvania, U.S.
- Education: New York University
- Occupations: Director, producer, writer
- Years active: 1982–present
- Notable work: Smithereens, Desperately Seeking Susan, Making Mr. Right, Cookie, She-Devil, Gaudi Afternoon, Musical Chairs
- Partner: Jonathan Brett

Susan Seidelman (/ˈsaɪdəlmən/; born December 11, 1952) is an American film director, producer, and writer. She is known for mixing comedy with drama and blending genres in her feature-film work. She is also notable for her art direction and pop-cultural references throughout her films, with a focus on women protagonists, particularly outsiders.

She first came to notice with Smithereens (1982), the earliest American independent feature to be screened in competition at the Cannes Film Festival. Her next feature, Desperately Seeking Susan (1985), co-starred Madonna in her first film, and was named as one of 100 greatest films directed by women by the BBC; it resulted in a Cesar Award nomination and in 2023 was selected for preservation in the National Film Registry by the Library of Congress for its "cultural, historical or aesthetic significance". She-Devil (1989) co-starred Meryl Streep in her first starring comedic film role, and Roseanne Barr in her first feature-film role.

Seidelman also worked in television, directing first-season episodes of Sex and the City, including the pilot. She directed productions for Showtime, Comedy Central and PBS.

Seidelman's memoir Desperately Seeking Something: A Memoir about Movies, Mothers and Material Girls was published in 2024.

== Early life and education ==
Seidelman was born on December 11, 1952 in Abington, Pennsylvania and raised in a suburb of Philadelphia, the oldest daughter of a hardware manufacturer and a teacher. She graduated from Abington Senior High School in 1969, and studied fashion and arts at Drexel University in Philadelphia. After taking a film appreciation class where she was inspired by the French New Wave, particularly the films of Jean-Luc Godard and François Truffaut, as well as Ingmar Bergman, she switched her focus to filmmaking.

Her first foray into movie-making at New York University resulted in a 1976 Student Academy Award Nomination for her satirical short film about a housewife's affair, And You Act Like One Too.

Seidelman earned an MFA from NYU's Tisch School of the Arts and between 2006 and 2019 was an adjunct professor in the school's film department, overseeing students' thesis films.

== Career ==
=== Early 1980s ===
Seidelman made her feature-film debut with Smithereens (1982), a bleak and darkly humorous look at New York City's downtown Bohemian scene of the 1980s. It was shot on 16mm for $40,000 on location, at times "guerrilla style" on the streets and in the subways of New York. Smithereens captured the look of the post-punk music scene and was the first American independent film to be selected for competition at the Cannes Film Festival. With recognition from Cannes, Seidelman became a member of the first wave of 80s-era independent filmmakers in the American cinema.

=== 1985–1999 ===
Seidelman's second theatrical film Desperately Seeking Susan (1985), featuring then-rising star Madonna, was a major box-office and critical success, launching the careers of co-stars Rosanna Arquette and Aidan Quinn and introducing a new generation of actors and performers such as John Turturro, Laurie Metcalf, Robert Joy, Mark Blum, Giancarlo Esposito, and comedian Steven Wright. Seidelman encouraged her producers to cast Madonna, who was a neighbor of hers with no previous film acting experience, believing she would lend downtown authenticity and charisma to the role.

Seidelman's subsequent movies of the 1980s were Making Mr. Right (1987), a romantic sci-fi comedy starring Ann Magnuson and John Malkovich, who played dual roles as both a socially awkward scientist and his lovesick android creation; Cookie (1989), a father-daughter mafia comedy starring Peter Falk, Dianne Wiest, and Emily Lloyd, written by Nora Ephron and Alice Arlen; and She-Devil (also 1989), the film version of Fay Weldon's bestselling novel, with Meryl Streep in her first comedic movie role and Roseanne Barr in her first feature-film role.

In 1994, Seidelman and screenwriter Jonathan Brett received an Academy Award nomination for best short film (live action) they co-wrote and co-produced called The Dutch Master. The film was part of the series "Erotic Tales" produced by Regina Ziegler and was screened at both the Cannes Film Festival and Telluride Film Festival. In the same year Seidelman was a member of the jury at the 44th Berlin International Film Festival.

=== 2000–present ===
Seidelman returned to feature films with Gaudi Afternoon (2001), a gender-bending detective story set in Barcelona, starring Judy Davis, Marcia Gay Harden, Juliette Lewis and Lili Taylor. The screenplay by James Myhre was based on the book Gaudi Afternoon: A Cassandra Reilly Mystery by Barbara Wilson.

Her film Boynton Beach Club (2005) was based on an original idea by her mother, Florence Seidelman, who while living in South Florida had gathered true stories of senior citizens who were suddenly back in the "dating game" after the loss of a spouse. It's one of the first movies to deal with sexuality and the aging Baby Boomer generation and had a theatrical run and acclaim at U.S. film festivals. The ensemble cast featured studio veterans Brenda Vaccaro, Dyan Cannon, Sally Kellerman, Joseph Bologna, Michael Nouri and Len Cariou.

Seidelman's next film Musical Chairs (2011) is set in the South Bronx and Manhattan and revolves around a couple taking part in a wheelchair ballroom dancing competition after the woman becomes disabled. The film featured an ensemble of able-bodied and disabled cast members that included Laverne Cox in her first film role. Musical Chairs premiered at the Miami International Film Festival and went on to receive a GLAAD nomination for Best Film in a Limited Release.

Seidelman's next film The Hot Flashes (2013) is about middle-aged women living in small-town Texas, all former 1980s basketball champs, reuniting to challenge the current girls' high school team to raise funds for a breast-cancer treatment center. It starred Brooke Shields, Daryl Hannah, Wanda Sykes, Virginia Madsen, Camryn Manheim, and Eric Roberts.

Seidelman's short film "Cut in Half" (2017) focuses on two Muslim sisters who must come to terms with the eldest sister's leukemia diagnosis, her feelings about continuing chemotherapy, and the decision between life and death. It starred Déa Julien, and Ajna Jai.

In 2023, Desperately Seeking Susan was added to the National Film Registry as part of a selection of films preserved by the Library of Congress for their historic, cultural or aesthetic contribution to American Cinema. In March 2024, La Cinemateque francaise in Paris held a retrospective of her films. That same year, Seidelman (along with Rosanna Arquette, received a Golden Thumb Award from Ebertfest. In 2025, Seidelman received the Indie Star Award from the American Film Festival (Wroclaw, Poland) for her significant contribution to Independent Cinema.

Seidelman's memoir “Desperately Seeking Something” was released by St. Martin's Press in June, 2024 to generally positive reviews. The New York Times Book Review stated: “Her films defined a gritty, magical New York moment....Susan Seidelman's life is as full of twists, charm and happy endings as one of her iconic movies." The LA Times said, “Director Susan Seidelman takes stock of her groundbreaking career,” in an interview where she noted her "capacity for ... 'aesthetic playfulness,' of finding [her] way toward something great. Publishers Weekly called the memoir “an enthralling look at a trailblazing filmmaker's perseverance and vision.”

=== Television ===
In the 1990s and 2000s Seidelman garnered success as a television director, helming the pilot of Sex and the City, which involved some casting and developing the look and feel of the show. Seidelman thought the pilot script by Darren Star was bold, presenting then-taboo subject matter with humor, saying, "It was the first time that a TV show featured women talking about things they really talk about in private." She directed subsequent episodes during the show's first season.

Seidelman received two Emmy nominations for the Showtime film A Cooler Climate, written by Pulitzer Prize-winner Marsha Norman, and starring Sally Field and Judy Davis. She also directed episodes of Comedy Central's cult comedy Stella and PBS's reboot of The Electric Company.

=== Influences ===
Seidelman was inspired as a film student by European film directors Lina Wertmüller and Agnès Varda, whose work she studied in the 1970s—a time when there were very few female directors active in the American film industry. The feminist movement of the 60s and 70s, as well as the personal filmmaking style of the French New Wave, and directors Jean-Luc Godard, François Truffaut, and John Cassavetes were also early influences. Seidelman is a fan of Billy Wilder for his social observation, drama, and humor.

Nora Ephron, with whom she collaborated on Cookie, was seen as a role model by Seidelman, as a woman writer and director able to combine family life with a successful film career. Among contemporaries, Seidelman notes the cerebral stories of the Coen Brothers, mid-career Woody Allen, early Martin Scorsese, and the films of Jane Campion are all favorites. She has said she is drawn to directors with distinct, slightly "outsider" points of view.

On her frequent blending of comedy with drama, Seidelman says, "If I wasn't a filmmaker I probably would've liked to be a cultural anthropologist or sociologist since I'm interested in human behavior. I like mixing comedy [with drama] because life is serious and humorous. . . . there's got to be something underneath the humor. I like using humor as a way of making observations about how we live and what makes us human."

== Themes ==
Altering the formulas of traditional film genres, Seidelman explores issues of identity for women of varying ages and backgrounds.

=== Updated film genres ===
Seidelman spins established film genres, updating them by focusing on female protagonists, society's outsiders and gender roles. In her autobiography, Seidelman mentions that she likes "looking at traditional movie genres from a different angle," having directed, "...a New Wave screwball comedy, an AI rom-com, a father-daughter mafia movie, a feminist revenge comedy, a gender-bending detective story, and a date movie about single seniors."

In Smithereens, set in the early 1980s, the trope of the plucky heroine trying to make it in the music world is upended by teenaged Wren's goal to become famous despite having no applicable creative talents. Plastering fliers of her face around the city, Wren's a precursor of the "famous for being famous" personalities of the Internet age. Seidelman says that Wren's story "is about something broader: the fragmented nature of life in the 80's. It could have taken place in other settings."

Desperately Seeking Susan is a screwball comedy inspired by Jacques Rivette's Celine and Julie Go Boating, that explores identity-swapping among its two protagonists, Roberta and Susan. Instead of a conventional male/female role-swap, bored suburbanite Roberta trades personas with adventuresome Susan, and by doing so, recognizes her inner desires, both romantic and artistic.

In Cookie, a mafia story, the primary focus is on the relationships between single mother, Lenore, her teenage daughter Cookie, and absentee crime-boss father, Dino, along with his wife, Bunny, reunited when he's released from prison. In Dino's absence, the women have learned to survive on their own and profane, independent Cookie supplies the solution to Dino's desire to go straight—resulting in a feminist family comic-drama within a gangster story.

Based on true stories from an insular Florida community, Boynton Beach Club follows several romantic relationships among people past retirement age. Members of a bereavement group navigate dating and relationships after the loss of longtime partners, encountering situations involving first dates, sexual insecurity, miscommunication, and misunderstandings. Seidelman said he had not seen films depicting older baby boomers dealing with loss, grief, and romance and sought to portray older adults without relying on stereotypes.

Further genre mixing is evident in Making Mr Right, which combines sci-fi with romance among an android, his maker, and a successful career woman whose job is to teach the android about emotions. Gaudi Afternoon blends the detective mystery with family drama. The Hot Flashes is an against-all-odds sports film with middle-aged underdogs going up against youthful champions.

=== Identity and self-actualization ===
Appearances and what they reveal and conceal is a recurring theme in Seidelman's films, along with how women rebel against or create a place for themselves within society's expectations.

Roberta in Desperately Seeking Susan takes on Susan's mysterious and troublesome identity when she wears her clothes. Devoid of her usual suburban-housewife wardrobe and suffering from amnesia, Roberta embarks on an urban adventure by "trying on" the free-spirited persona of Susan. Susan, in search of Roberta, lives in her large house for 24 hours, trashing it, but appreciating the luxury and comfort therein.

She-Devil is a revenge comedy/satire that pits homely abandoned wife Ruth against beautiful wealthy romance-novelist Mary. By taking revenge on her husband, Ruth finds power utilizing her skills as a formerly unpaid homemaker, and obtains success by employing other women in the same predicament. Mary, in contrast, saddled with Ruth's children, discovers how difficult maintaining a household can be – at odds with the tropes of romance-fiction.

Aspects of sexual identity and parenthood are explored in Gaudi Afternoon, set in Barcelona, Spain, where translator Cassandra, middle-aged, purposefully single, with no desire for children, finds herself enmeshed in a family squabble among a pansexual group of San Francisco transplants.

=== Pop culture, performance and transformation ===
Seidelman's early studies in fashion have influenced her art direction, costumes and overall style as visual story elements in her films.

Fashion and reflective colors make downtown New York of the 80s a stylized East Village wonderland for Roberta in Desperately Seeking Susan. In contrast, her suburban home is presented in cool pastels and hard edges—an atmosphere where social mores and false fronts are more rigidly enforced. Performing as a magician's assistant, where costume and artifice is a requirement, she hones her survival skills that lead to personal satisfaction on and off the stage.

Smithereens explored the same colorful downtown scene, but with more grit and squalor, reflecting its low-budget independent production. Wren has more desire than creative skill, but like Giulietta Masina's character in Fellini's Nights of Cabiria, whom Seidelman notes as an inspiration, she's a survivor and her wish for recognition within the local punk-rock scene is presented without judgment.

A magic club is also a feature of Gaudí Afternoon where asexual Cassandra, through her attraction to openly bisexual Hamilton—an amateur magician—acknowledges her own sexual awareness. Antoni Gaudí's eccentric, sensual architecture is the scenic backdrop to Cassandra's deeper involvement with an alternative family and their young daughter, which ultimately brings about change in her personal life.

A diverse cast of dancers perform in Musical Chairs, where Armando and Mia's relationship develops within the world of competitive wheelchair ballroom dancing—a dance form popular in Europe and Asia, but mostly unknown in the U.S. The dance troupe, outsiders in the world of feature-film, include a transgender woman and an Iraqi veteran, highlighting dance as a form of self-expression available to everyone. Laverne Cox, who is transgender, has said that playing Chantelle, a disabled black transgender woman, in a feature film was a career milestone.

== Personal life ==
Seidelman is married to screenwriter and producer Jonathan Brett. As of 2022, she lives in the "New Jersey countryside, to which she and her husband recently moved after several decades in downtown New York". Their son Oscar is a producer and video editor.

== Awards and nominations ==
Year	Award	Category	Title	Result	Notes
2025	American Film Festival, Wroclaw, Poland	Indie Star Award		Won	
2025	Albany Film Festival	Ironweed Award		Won	
2024	Added to the National Film Registry	Library of Congress	Desperately Seeking Susan	Won	
2021	Mystic Film Festival	Lifetime Achievement Award		Won	
2015	New Hope Film Festival	Lifetime Achievement Award		Won	
2013	Women Film Critics Circle Awards	Best Ensemble Cast	The Hot Flashes	Nominated	
2013	Massachusetts Independent Film Festival	Best Feature Film	Musical Chairs	Won	
2013	Massachusetts Independent Film Festival	Best Feature Director	Musical Chairs	Won	
2012	GLAAD Media Awards	Outstanding Film, Limited Release	Musical Chairs	Nominated	
2012	Astaire Awards	Best Dance Film	Musical Chairs	Nominated	
2007	AARP Movies For Grownups Awards	Best Screenplay	Boynton Beach Club	Nominated	
2006	LA Femme International Film Festival	Meritorious Achievement Award			
1993	Academy Awards	Best Live Action Short Film	The Dutch Master	Nominated	
1989	New York Women in Film and Television	Muse Award			
1986	César Awards	Best Foreign Language Film	Desperately Seeking Susan	Nominated	
1982	Cannes Film Festival	Golden Palm	Smithereens	Nominated	

== Filmography ==
=== Film ===
Short film

Year	Title	Director	Writer	Producer	Editor	Notes
1976	And You Act Like One Too	Yes	Yes	Yes	Yes	
1979	Yours Truly, Andrea G. Stern	Yes	Yes	Yes	Yes	
1996	The Dutch Master	Yes	Yes	No	No	Segment of Tales of Erotica
2017	Cut in Half	Yes	No	No	No	

Feature film

Year	Title	Director	Producer	Writer
1982	Smithereens	Yes	Yes	Story
1985	Desperately Seeking Susan	Yes	No	No
1987	Making Mr. Right	Yes	Executive	No
1989	Cookie	Yes	Executive	No
1989	She-Devil	Yes	Yes	No
2001	Gaudi Afternoon	Yes	Yes	No
2005	Boynton Beach Club	Yes	Yes	Yes
2011	Musical Chairs	Yes	Executive	No
2013	The Hot Flashes	Yes	Yes	No

Documentary film

Year	Title	Director	Producer
1992	Confessions of a Suburban Girl	Yes	Yes

=== Television ===
TV movies

- The Barefoot Executive (1995)
- A Cooler Climate (1999)
- Power and Beauty (2002)
- The Ranch (2004)

TV series

Year	Title	Episode(s)
1996	Early Edition	"Thief Swipes Mayor's Dog"
1998	Sex and the City	"Sex and the City" (pilot)
1998	Sex and the City	"The Power of Female Sex"
1998	Sex and the City	"The Baby Shower"
1999	Now and Again	"One for the Money"
2005	Stella	"Office Party"
2005	Stella	"Paper Route"
2009–10	The Electric Company	"The Flube Whisperer"
2009–10	The Electric Company	"Mighty Bright Fight"
2009–10	The Electric Company	"Jules Quest"
2009–10	The Electric Company	"Revolutionary Doughnuts"

Music videos

Year	Title	Artist
1984	"I Wanna Know"	The Restless
1985	"Into the Groove"	Madonna
