= Push Girls =

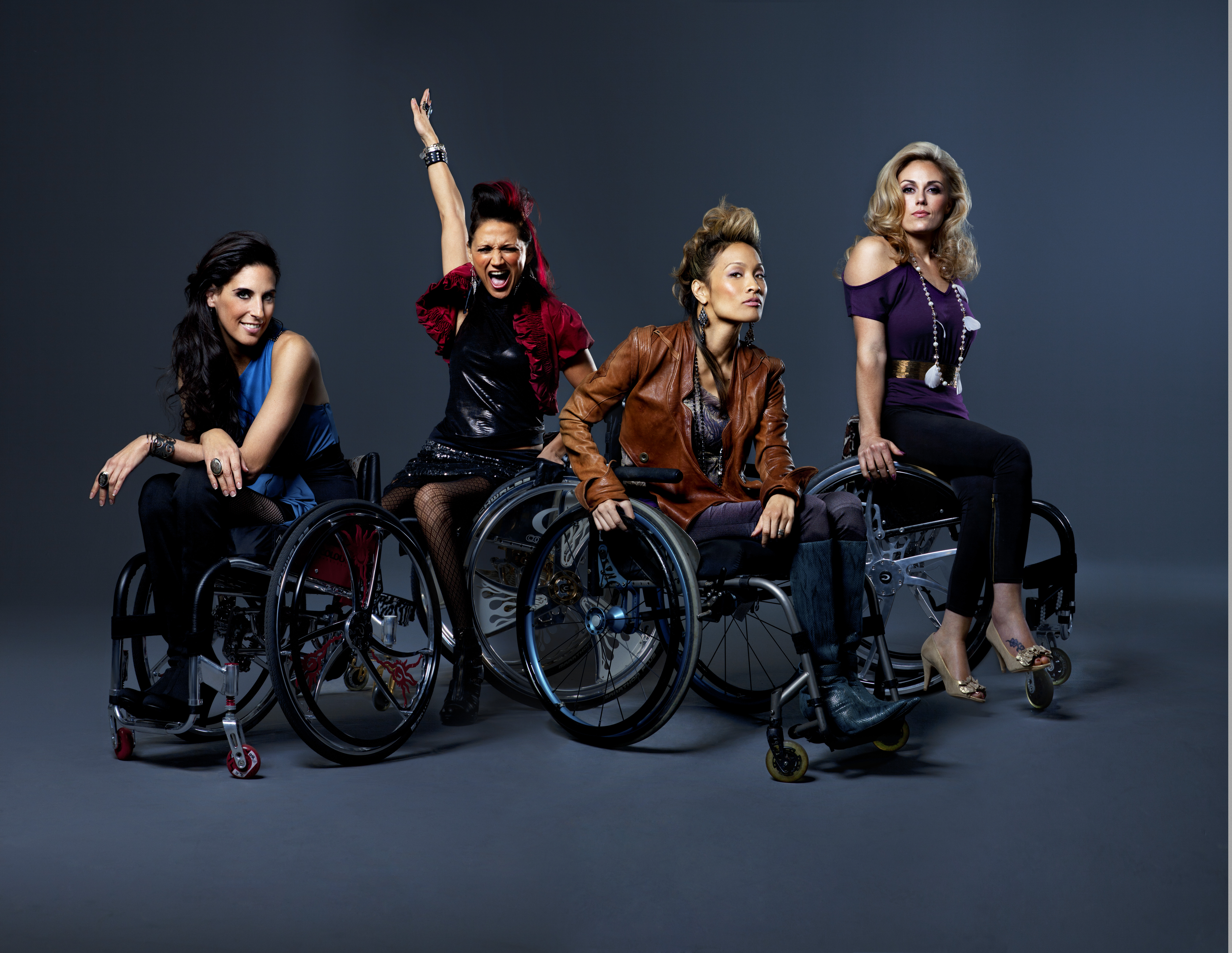
- Genre: Reality
- Starring: Angela Rockwood; Auti Angel; Mia Schaikewitz; Tiphany Adams; Chelsie Hill
- Country of origin: United States
- Original language: English
- No. of seasons: 2
- No. of episodes: 24

Production
- Executive producer: Gay Rosenthal
- Running time: 19 to 24 minutes
- Production company: Gay Rosenthal Productions

Original release
- Network: SundanceTV
- Release: April 17, 2012 – July 22, 2013

Push Girls is an American reality television series on the SundanceTV. A sneak peek episode, and original premiere date, aired on April 17, 2012, with the official debut on June 4, 2012. Push Girls chronicles the lives of four women—Angela Rockwood, Tiphany Adams, Mia Schaikewitz, and Auti Angel—who have been paralyzed by illness or accident and displays the day-to-day challenges and triumphs they encounter. The series is set in Los Angeles, California.

It was announced on November 15, 2012, that AMC Networks began production on the 10-episode second season. The second season premiered on June 3, 2013.

== Cast ==
- Angela Rockwood is an actress, model, producer, and an ambassador with the Christopher and Dana Reeve Foundation. She is described as "Buddha-like" and is the "Mother Earth" of the foursome. She became a quadriplegic in 2001 after a car accident shattered her C4–C5 vertebrae and severed her spinal cord. She was the third American to receive stem cell surgery, which she believes helped her move from a power chair to a manual chair. She had a bit role in the 2001 film The Fast and the Furious before becoming paralyzed.
- Auti Angel, a paraplegic, was paralyzed after a car accident in 1992. The backup dancer had just finished a gig—performing with LL Cool J at the Grammys in New York City—and was returning home to Los Angeles when a car clipped hers on the 101 Freeway. The show documents her career as a dancer, leader of the Colours 'N' Motion dance team, singer and actress, as well as her attempts to have a child. Auti Angel has a supporting role in the 2011 film Musical Chairs and heads the Save a Soul Foundation.
- Mia Schaikewitz (/ˈmiːə ˈʃaɪkɪwɪts/) was paralyzed from the waist down at the age of 15 when an arteriovenous malformation (AVM) ruptured in her spinal cord. An athlete at heart, she stayed active in adaptive sports, but avoided swimming—her first love. The series follows her emotional return to the water. She is a project manager in a graphic design firm.
- Tiphany Adams was paralyzed in 2000, the result of a devastating car accident. "I was 17-and-a-half, in my senior year in high school, when I was in a head-on vehicle collision caused by a drunk driver, hit at 130 miles per hour. We were all pronounced dead on the scene, and I was in a coma for three weeks. When I woke up, I was like, ‘I’m going to get through this, and I’m going to live my life to the fullest.’" She is considered "the blond bombshell" of the group with an uncensored mouth and open, honest nature. She loves sex with both men and women and doesn't like labels.
- Chelsie Hill was paralyzed in high school after getting into a car with a drunk driver. Prior to becoming paralyzed, she hoped to become a professional dancer. She and her father founded the Walk and Roll Foundation, which aims to help people with spinal cord injuries. She also does public speaking engagements to educate teens on drunk driving.

== Episodes ==
=== Series overview ===
Season	Episodes	Originally released	
Season	Episodes	First released	Last released
1	14	June 4, 2012	August 27, 2012
2	10	June 3, 2013	July 22, 2013

=== Season 1 (2012) ===
No. overall	No. in season	Title	Original release date
0	0	"Sneak Peek"	April 17, 2012
1	1	"Everyone Stares"	June 4, 2012
2	2	"Watch Me"	June 4, 2012
3	3	"You Don't Get It"	June 11, 2012
4	4	"Hope It's Not Too Late"	June 18, 2012
5	5	"How Did I Get Here?"	June 25, 2012
6	6	"Fired Up"	July 2, 2012
7	7	"This is How We Get Through"	July 9, 2012
8	8	"Living in the Fast Lane"	July 16, 2012
9	9	"Freaky Deaky"	July 23, 2012
10	10	"Out of Control"	July 30, 2012
11	11	"Breaking the Ice"	August 6, 2012
12	12	"Moving On"	August 13, 2012
13	13	"In the Deep End"	August 20, 2012
14	14	"Breaking Back In"	August 27, 2012

=== Season 2 (2013) ===
No. overall	No. in season	Title	Original release date
15	1	"Strange Love"	June 3, 2013
16	2	"Betrayed"	June 3, 2013
17	3	"Surprising News"	June 10, 2013
18	4	"Tiphany's Missing Sister: Part 1"	June 17, 2013
19	5	"Tiphany's Missing Sister: Part 2"	June 24, 2013
20	6	"Sex Ed"	July 1, 2013
21	7	"How Dare You!"	July 8, 2013
22	8	"Escape to Mexico"	July 15, 2013
23	9	"Love Me or Leave Me"	July 22, 2013
24	10	"Season Finale"	July 22, 2013
