= Angela Rockwood =

American actress

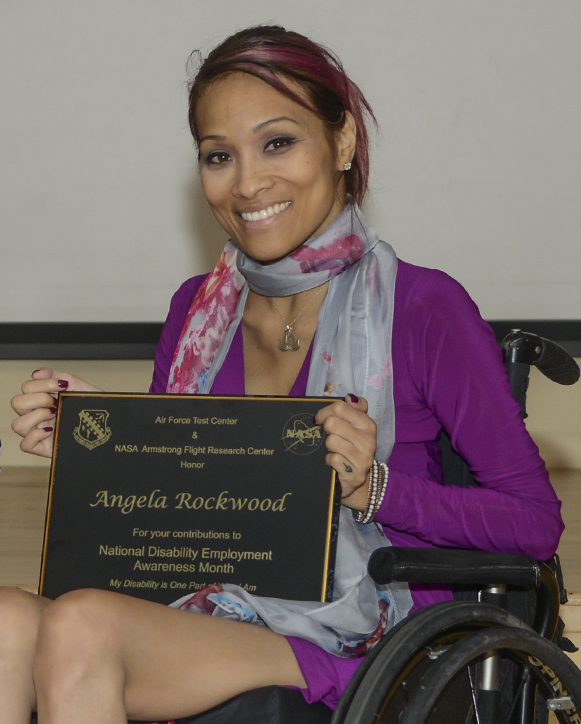
- Rockwood at Edwards Air Force Base Disability Employment Awareness Month luncheon in 2015
- Born: March 15, 1975 (age 51); Clovis, New Mexico, U.S.
- Occupations: Actress, model
- Notable work: Push Girls
- Spouse: Dustin Nguyen (m. 2001; div. 2013)

Angela Rockwood (born March 15, 1975) is an American actress and model, best known for roles in The Fast and the Furious, the syndicated television series V.I.P. and for her reality television series Push Girls.

== Early life ==
Born in Clovis, New Mexico, Rockwood is the oldest of four children of German-Thai descent and was raised in the Philippines, Spain, and Guam. At the age of 22, she moved from San Francisco to Los Angeles to finish art school and work with Michelle Bohbot and Bijan. She later turned down a job as a composite sketch artist for the LAPD and instead accepted a modeling job for designer Michelle of Bisou Bisou.

== Car crash ==
On September 3, 2001, Rockwood was involved in a car crash on California's Interstate 5 Highway between San Francisco and Los Angeles during a Labor Day weekend. Rockwood and two of her bridesmaids were returning late at night from visiting her maid-of-honor for her upcoming marriage to Dustin Nguyen.

The car was being driven by Rockwood’s bridesmaid, Steffiana de la Cruz. She lost control of the vehicle and it swerved violently across the road, before hitting a rock face and flipping several times, then hit the safety rail and plunged over the bank.

Rockwood was thrown from the vehicle before its final impact and was subsequently rendered a quadriplegic. The other passenger was Vietnamese-American actress Thuy Trang of Mighty Morphin Power Rangers, who was also due to be one of Rockwood’s bridesmaids. 27 year-old Trang sustained significant internal injuries, and died while in a helicopter which was transporting her to the hospital.

Doctors gave Rockwood a 3% chance of regaining motor skills and feeling below her neck. Through occupational therapy and physical therapy, she regained partial motion in her left index finger two months after the crash. Three months later, she could touch the top of her head. In 2003, she received stem cell treatments in Portugal that allowed her to eventually use a manual wheelchair.

== Post-crash career ==
In 2012, The Sundance Channel announced the creation of Push Girls, a reality television series about living with paralysis in Hollywood produced by Gay Rosenthal, which cast Rockwood among "four dynamic, outspoken and beautiful women" in the Los Angeles area.

== Personal life ==
Rockwood and actor Dustin Nguyen secretly eloped on February 14, 2001. They separated and divorced in 2012.
