= Auti Angel =

American entertainer (1969–2022)

- Born: Christina Marie Mendez; October 15, 1969; San Diego, California, U.S.
- Died: March 23, 2022 (aged 52); Los Angeles, California
- Occupations: Actress, singer, rapper, dancer, choreographer

Auti Angel (born Christina Marie Mendez October 15, 1969 – March 23, 2022) was an American entertainer.

Mendez was born in San Diego and raised in Torrance, California. At 18, she launched a professional dancing, choreography, and music career. She was paralyzed from the waist down in a 1992 car accident and continued her career. She was a main character on the 2012 The Sundance Channel reality television series Push Girls, which won a Critics Choice Award for "Best Reality TV Show". She was also one of the stars in the HBO film Musical Chairs. She died March 22, 2022, of breast cancer.

== Early life ==
Mendez was born to an English mother and a Mexican-Peruvian father. Her father Richard Mendez played the role of "Gina's Killer" in Scarface (1983). She had a passion for dancing from a young age. Angel has said she was a victim of physical and sexual abuse as a child. She attended Narbonne High School in Los Angeles.

== Career ==
Angel left home at the age of 18 and briefly worked as a stripper, but only lasted a week in that profession. After that, she worked as a backup dancer in the Straight Outta Compton Tour for Eazy E and NWA. She also worked with LL Cool J and appeared in several music videos.

In 1992, Angel's spine was injured in a car accident causing her to become paralysed from the waist down. Shortly after her accident, Angel's mother died. She suffered with depression and addiction after these incidents, but reportedly overcame it through religion.

In 2011, Angel starred in the romantic comedy Musical Chairs. Between 2012 and 2014, she starred in the reality series Push Girls which she became best known for.

== Legacy ==
Her work increased visibility for wheelchair dancers and helped expand opportunities for disabled artists in entertainment and dance. In 2022, the Auti Angel Events Arena at Abilities Expo events was sponsored by Hollister Incorporated and featured adaptive sports, fitness, dance, and educational programs, continuing Angel's legacy of promoting disability inclusion and empowerment.

== Filmography ==
- Wings of Legacy (2006) (Auti)
- Musical Chairs (2011) (Nicky)
- Hollywood Sex Wars (2011) (Wheelchair Dancer)
- Only Human (2019) (Angel)
- Commander in Chief (2020) (Wheelchair)
