= The Old Ways =

2020 American horror film

- Promotional release poster
- Directed by: Christopher Alender
- Written by: Marcos Gabriel
- Produced by: Christa Boarini; T. Justin Ross; David Grove Churchill Viste
- Starring: Brigitte Kali Canales; Andrea Cortés; Julia Vera; Sal Lopez; A. J. Bowen
- Music by: Ben Lovett
- Production company: Soapbox Films
- Release date: October 2020 (Sitges Film Festival)
- Running time: 90 minutes
- Country: United States
- Languages: English; Spanish; Nahuatl

The Old Ways is a 2020 American folk horror film directed by Christopher Alender. It stars Brigitte Kali Canales as Cristina Lopez, a Mexican-American reporter who returns to her hometown near Veracruz in search of a story on witchcraft. There, she is kidnapped by a group of locals, including a bruja (a female practitioner of witchcraft), who believe her to be possessed by a demon.

The Old Ways had its world premiere at the Sitges Film Festival in October 2020.

== Plot ==
A young Cristina watches as her mother undergoes an exorcism. When her mother beckons Cristina to her bedside, the demon controlling her lunges at Cristina and leaves scratches on her arm.

In the present, an adult Cristina wakes up in a remote hut near Catemaco in Veracruz, Mexico. A man, Javi, asks her why she was in a region called La Boca. Luz, a Nahua bruja, looks into her eyes and proclaims, "She has it." Javi then forces Cristina to drink goat's milk to purify her soul. Cristina's cousin Miranda explains that she found her lying unconscious at La Boca and brought her to Luz and Javi to help her.

It is revealed that Cristina is a Los Angeles journalist who returned to her hometown to investigate the La Boca ruins. She is addicted to heroin and continues to inject the drug with her remaining syringes while chained to her bed, insisting that she does not have a demon inside of her. Luz and Javi perform a ritual to exorcise the demon. Though Cristina remains skeptical, she accepts she is possessed after disturbing events occur: snakes enter her room, she finds a rooster inexplicably mangled in her cell, and sees candles burn out and lead to a dark corner in the room. During another ritual, Luz seems to pull animal teeth out of her abdomen, and unsuccessfully tries to extract a snake, which escapes back into her body.

One night, she chokes Javi unconscious and tries to escape, but the salt line across the threshold of the door prevents her from leaving. She becomes a believer in the demon, Postehki, after she vomits hair and black liquid. Postehki is "the death god of broken things," and has inhabited her because she is chronically depressed from spending her youth in foster care and turned to heroin. She had taken an assignment to visit her hometown planning to commit suicide via overdose at La Boca, where no one would find her, unaware the demon had drawn her there intent to finish "consuming" her. She discards what's left of her heroin supply and becomes determined to defeat the demon.

Cristina asks about a mysterious boy she sees occasionally. The group declares they don't know of any boy living nearby. Cristina discovers the "broken man ritual" from a book Miranda gave her. During another ritual, Luz temporarily subdues a convulsing Cristina. Postehki reveals itself to Luz, who seizes its heart, sacrificing her life to expel it and save Cristina. However, Postehki enters Miranda through the scratches Cristina gave her earlier. Cristina paints her face, taking over the bruja role from Luz, and they draw out Postehki through rejecting the old ritualistic ways in favor of a more compassionate approach. Cristina grabs its heart, throws it to Miranda, who stabs it - burning and apparently killing Postehki.

Cristina's editor Carson is brought to the hut by the locals after he was found near La Boca. He's arrived to rescue her, but he's brought more heroin. Cristina is uninterested in the drugs, and instead determines that he has been possessed once she sees his eyes and sees a demon behind him. She begins the ritual to save Carson, having fully assumed the role as the new bruja.

== Cast ==
- Brigitte Kali Canales as Cristina
- Andrea Cortés as Miranda, Cristina's cousin
- Julia Vera as Luz
- Sal Lopez as Javi
- A. J. Bowen as Carson
- Weston Meredith as Postehki
- Julian Lerma as the Boy
- Elizabeth Phoenix Caro as Young Cristina
- Michelle Jubilee Gonzalez as Cristina's Mother

== Reception ==
On Rotten Tomatoes, The Old Ways has an approval rating of 96% based on 26 reviews, with an average rating of 7.2/10. The site's critical consensus reads, "A demonic possession movie with impressive depth, The Old Ways uses familiar genre ingredients to cast a uniquely gripping spell." Metacritic, which uses a weighted average, assigned the film a score of 67 out of 100, based on 4 critics, indicating "generally favorable" reviews.

Deirdre Crimmins, writing for Rue Morgue, called the film "part possession, part bruja, and part confession, and an all-around good and scary movie."
