= List of MSX games =

The following is a list of video games for the MSX, MSX2, MSX2+, and MSX turbo R home computers.

There are currently 2279 (Note: This figure is automatically updated by the Template:Table row counter script.) commercial games released for the system. public domain and scene releases are excluded, and only commercial compilations containing titles without standalone releases are included.

Title	Year	Genre	MSX1	MSX2	MSX2+	MSX turbo R	Developer	Publisher
'Thing' Bounces Back	1987	Action game	✓	✓	✓	✓	Gremlin Graphics	Gremlin Graphics
007 Agente Especial	1985	Obstacle avoiding	✓	✓	✓	✓	Monser	Monser
007: A View to a Kill	1985	Platform-adventure	✓	✓	✓	✓	Domark	Domark
007: The Living Daylights	1987	Run and gun	✓	✓	✓	✓	Walking Circles Software	Domark
007: Licence to Kill	1989	Vertical shooter	✓	✓	✓	✓	Domark	Domark
10 MSX Hits on Disk No. 1	1988	Compilation	✓	✓	✓	✓	Odin Software	Odin Software
10 MSX Hits on Disk No. 2	1988	Compilation	✓	✓	✓	✓	Odin Software	Odin Software
10-Yard Fight	1986	Sports - Rugby	✓	✓	✓	✓	Irem	Irem
10th Frame	1987	Sports - Bowling	✓	✓	✓	✓	Access Software	Kixx
180	1987	Sports - Darts	✓	✓	✓	✓	Mastertronic	Mastertronic
1789, La Révolution	1989	Simulator - Geopolitics	✓	✓	✓	✓	Legend	Legend
1942	1986	Vertical shooter	✓	✓	✓	✓	Capcom	ASCII Corporation
1942 (MSX2)	1986	Vertical shooter	✗	✓	✓	✓	Capcom	ASCII Corporation
2021 Snooky	1992	Shoot 'em up	✗	✗	✗	✓	Atelier Taka	Atelier Taka
3-D Bomberman (aka 三次元ボンバーマン)	1984	First-person maze	✓	✓	✓	✓	Hudson Soft	Hudson Soft
3-D Golf Simulation	1984	Sports - Golf	✓	✓	✓	✓	T&E Soft	T&E Soft
3-D Golf Simulation - High-Speed Edition	1984	Sports - Golf	✓	✓	✓	✓	T&E Soft	T&E Soft
3D Knockout	1984	Sports - Boxing	✓	✓	✓	✓	Alligata	Alligata
3D Pool (aka Maltese Joe's Pool Challenge)	1989	Cue sports	✓	✓	✓	✓	Aardvark Software	Firebird
3D Tennis	1983	Sports - Tennis	✓	✓	✓	✓	ASCII Corporation	ASCII Corporation
3D Water Driver (aka 3Dウォータードライバー)	1984	Obstacle avoiding	✓	✓	✓	✓	Apollo Technica	Apollo Technica
4x4 Off-Road Racing	1988	Racing/Simulator	✓	✓	✓	✓	Epyx	Epyx
The 4th Unit (aka 第4のユニット)	1988	Adventure	✗	✓	✓	✓	Data West	Data West
The 4th Unit Act.2 (aka 第4のユニット2)	1988	Adventure	✗	✓	✓	✓	Data West	Data West
The 4th Unit Act.3 - Dual Targets (aka デュアル・ターゲット −第4のユニット3−)	1989	Adventure	✗	✓	✓	✓	Data West	Data West
The 4th Unit Act.4 - Zerø (aka 第4のユニットZERO)	1990	Adventure	✗	✓	✓	✓	Data West	Data West
5-Ball	1983	Block breaker	✓	✓	✓	✓	Nyan	Nyan
737 Flight Simulator	1985	Flight simulation	✓	✓	✓	✓	Salamander Software	Mirrorsoft
747 400b Flight Simulator	1988	Flight simulator	✓	✓	✓	✓	Methodic Solutions	System 4
(DIRES) - giger . loop -	1987	Shoot 'em up	✗	✗	✓	✓	Bothtec	Bothtec
A Lenda da Gávea	1988	Adventure	✓	✓	✓	✓	Pro Kit	Pro Kit
A Life M36 Planet (aka 生命惑星M36生きていたマザーブレイン)	1987	Action-platformer	✓	✓	✓	✓	Pixel Co.	Pixel Co.
A.E.	1984	Fixed shooter	✓	✓	✓	✓	Programmers-3	Toshiba-EMI
A-Na-Za - Kaleidoscope Special (aka ア・ナ・ザ カレイドスコープスペシャル)	1987	Vertical shooter	✓	✓	✓	✓	HOT - B	HOT - B
The A-Team (aka El Equipo A)	1988	Rail shooter	✓	✓	✓	✓	New Frontier	Zafiro
A1 Grand Prix (aka A1グランプリ)	1987	Racing	✓	✓	✓	✓	Konami	Nippon Telenet
Aaargh!	1989	Action	✓	✓	✓	✓	Melbourne House	Dro Soft
Abracadabra	1988	Interactive fiction	✓	✓	✓	✓	Proein Soft Line	Odisea Soft
Abu Simbel Profanation	1985	Platformer	✓	✓	✓	✓	Dinamic	Dinamic
Ace of Aces	1986	Flight Simulator	✓	✓	✓	✓	Artech Digital Productions / Paragon Programming	U.S. Gold
Acentue! Oxítonas I	?	Action - Edutainment	✓	✓	✓	✓	Gradiente	Gradiente
Acentue! Oxítonas II	?	Action - Edutainment	✓	✓	✓	✓	Gradiente	Gradiente
Acentue! Paroxítonas I	?	Action - Edutainment	✓	✓	✓	✓	Gradiente	Gradiente
Acentue! Paroxítonas II	?	Action - Edutainment	✓	✓	✓	✓	Gradiente	Gradiente
Acentue! Proparoxítonas	?	Action - Edutainment	✓	✓	✓	✓	Gradiente	Gradiente
Acrobatas (aka Bal(loon)ies)	1987	Action - Timing	✓	✓	✓	✓	Fangsoft	Nemesis Informática
Acrojet	1988	Flight simulator	✗	✓	✓	✓	SystemSoft	SystemSoft
Actman	1985	Action-platformer	✓	✓	✓	✓	Mass Tael	ASCII Corporation
Addicta Ball	1987	Block breaker	✓	✓	✓	✓	Alligata	Alligata
Adel	1987	Platformer	✓	✓	✓	✓	Mind Games España	Mind Games España
Adven' Chuta!	1983	Maze	✓	✓	✓	✓	MIA	MIA
Adventure Game Series 1 - Ghost Ship	1984	Adventure	✓	✓	✓	✓	New era company	New era company
Adventure Game Series 2 - Treasure Island	1984	Adventure	✓	✓	✓	✓	New era company	New era company
Adventure Quest	1984	Interactive fiction	✓	✓	✓	✓	Level 9 Computing	Level 9 Computing
African Trail Simulator	1990	Sports - BMX	✓	✓	✓	✓	Positive Software	Positive Software
After Burner	1988	Vehicular combat - Aircraft	✓	✓	✓	✓	SEGA	Activision
After the War	1989	Beat 'em up	✓	✓	✓	✓	Dinamic	Dinamic
Afternoon Angels	1987	Adventure	✓	✓	✓	✓	Jast	Jast
Afternoon Angels 2 - Minako	1988	Adventure	✓	✓	✓	✓	Jast	Jast
Afternoon Angels 2 Extra 2	1989	Adventure	✓	✓	✓	✓	Jast	Jast
Afternoon Angels 3 - Ribbon	1990	Adventure	✓	✓	✓	✓	Jast	Jast
Afteroids	1988	Multidirectional shooter - Asteroids	✓	✓	✓	✓	Made in Spain	Zigurat
Air Hockey	1992	Sports game	✗	✓	✓	✓	ASCII Corporation	ASCII Corporation
Akanbe Dragon	1988	Action game	✗	✓	✓	✓	Winky Soft	Winky Soft
Akaoni Aooni	1984	Action-platformer	✓	✓	✓	✓	Marufune F.S.L	Marufune F.S.L
Akarui Nouen	1983	Action game	✓	✓	✓	✓	Hudson Soft	Hudson Soft
Akujo Legend	1986	Adventure	✓	✓	✓	✓	Dream Soft	Dream Soft
Aladdin (aka علاء الدين)	1986	Action	✓	✓	✓	✓	Barq	Barq
Albatross	1986	Sports - Golf	✓	✓	✓	✓	Telenet Japan	Telenet Japan
Albatross II Masters' History	1989	Sports - Golf	✗	✓	✓	✓	Reno Games	Telenet Japan
Alcatraz: A Fuga Impossivel	1986	Maze/Puzzle	✓	✓	✓	✓	Wilson F. Martins	Disprosoft
Alcazar: The Forgotten Fortress	1985	Action-adventure/Maze	✓	✓	✓	✓	Tom Loughry	Activision
Ale Hop!	1988	Side-scroller/Obstacle avoiding	✓	✓	✓	✓	Topo Soft	Erbe Software
Alerta Lunar	1986	Horizontal shooter	✓	✓	✓	✓	Grupo de Trabajo Software (G.T.S.)	Sygran, S.A.
Aleste (aka アレスタ)	1988	Vertical shooter	✗	✓	✓	✓	Compile	Compile
Aleste 2 (aka アレスタ2)	1989	Vertical shooter	✗	✓	✓	✓	Compile	Compile
Aleste Gaiden (aka Aleste Special, ンスペシャル秋号)	1989	Vertical shooter	✗	✓	✓	✓	Compile	Compile
Alfamat	1985	Educational/Puzzle	✓	✓	✓	✓	Vifi International	Sony Spain
Ali Baba (aka علي بابا)	1989	Variety	✗	✓	✓	✓	Al Alamiah	Al Alamiah
Ali Baba and 40 Thieves	1984	Maze	✓	✓	✓	✓	Sony	Sony
Alice in Chemical Reaction: Alice's Chemical Laboratory	1985	Action-adventure	✓	✓	✓	✓	Victor Co. of Japan (JVC)	Victor Co. of Japan (JVC)
Alice's Adventure in Wonderland	1984	Adventure	✓	✓	✓	✓	Microcabin	Toshiba
Alien 8	1985	Isometric platformer	✓	✓	✓	✓	Tim and Chris Stamper	Ultimate Play the Game (U.K.), Jaleco (Japan)
Alien Base	1986	Maze	✓	✓	✓	✓	Marco Zanchi	Visiogame
Alien Sunday...?	1986	Adventure	✓	✓	✓	✓	Soft Studio WING	Soft Studio WING
Alien Sunday...? (MSX2)	1986	Adventure	✗	✓	✓	✓	Soft Studio WING	Soft Studio WING
Alien Syndrome	1985	Action	✓	✓	✓	✓	Xortrapa Soft	Dro Soft
Aliens: The Computer Game	1987	Action-adventure/Horror	✓	✓	✓	✓	Mr. Micro	Electric Dreams Software
Aliens: Alien 2	1987	Run and gun	✓	✓	✓	✓	Square	Square
All you want to do: Multi-target Adventure	1988	Adventure	✗	✓	✓	✓	Lucifer Soft	Lucifer Soft
Alpha Blaster (aka Astro Blaster)	1984	Fixed shooter	✓	✓	✓	✓	Aackosoft	Aackosoft
Alpha Centauro (aka Astro Blaster)	1987	Fixed shooter	✓	✓	✓	✓	A.G.D.	Sygran, S.A.
Alpha Squadron	1984	Flight Simulator	✓	✓	✓	✓	AG Corp.	Sony
Alpharoid (aka アルファロイド)	1986	Horizontal shooter	✓	✓	✓	✓	Opera House inc	Pony
Alpine Ski	1987	Sports - Skiing	✓	✓	✓	✓	Double Brain!	Double Brain!
Altered Beast	1988	Beat 'em up	✓	✓	✓	✓	SEGA	MCM Software
Amazon	1987	Interactive fiction	✗	✓	✓	✓	Telarium Corp.	Philips Spain
Amazônia	1989	Interactive fiction	✗	✓	✓	✓	Ciberne	Ciberne
Amaurote	1987	Multidirectional shooter	✓	✓	✓	✓	Binary Design	Mastertronic
Amber testament	1988	Adventure	✗	✓	✓	✓	Riverhill Soft	Riverhill Soft
American Soccer	1987	Sports - Soccer	✓	✓	✓	✓	Nidecom	Universal Co. LTD
American Success	1989	Action game	✗	✓	✓	✓	Winky Soft	Winky Soft
American Truck	1985	Vertical scroller	✓	✓	✓	✓	Telenet Japan	Telenet Japan
Amida Kuji (aka あーみだーくじ)	1983	Obstacle avoiding	✓	✓	✓	✓	Victor Musical Industries	Pony Canyon
Amoto's Puf	1988	Vehicular combat - Bike	✓	✓	✓	✓	SPE	System 4
Amo del Mundo	1990	Run and gun	✓	✓	✓	✓	Positive Software	Positive Software
An adventure of the blue universe	1985	Adventure	✓	✓	✓	✓	IO	Leben Pro
Andorogynus (aka 反生命戦機アンドロギュヌス)	1987	Vertical shooter	✗	✓	✓	✓	Telenet Japan	Telenet Japan
Angel Nieto Pole 500 c.c.	1990	Racing - Motorcycle	✓	✓	✓	✓	Opera Soft	Opera Soft
Angelo (aka アンジェロ)	1984	Action	✓	✓	✓	✓	Mass Tael	ASCII Corporation
Angelus: Devil's Gospel	1989	Adventure	✗	✓	✓	✓	Enix	Enix
Angleball	1987	Cue sports	✗	✓	✓	✓	Mastertronic	Mastertronic
Animal Land Murder Case (aka Animal Land Satsujin Jiken, アニマルランド殺人事件)	1987	Adventure	✓	✓	✓	✓	ENIX	ENIX
Antarctic Adventure (aka けっきょく南極大冒険)	1983	Scrolling platformer	✓	✓	✓	✓	Konami	Konami
Antarctica	1983	Simulation video game	✓	✓	✓	✓	Pony Canyon	Pony Canyon
Antares	1987	Horizontal shooter	✓	✓	✓	✓	Juliet Software	Juliet Software
Anty	1984	Action	✓	✓	✓	✓	Bothtec	ASCII Corporation
The Apeman Strikes Again	1985	Single-screen platformer - Donkey Kong	✓	✓	✓	✓	The Bytebusters	Eaglesoft
Aquapolis SOS (aka アクアポリスSOS)	1984	Action	✓	✓	✓	✓	Nisso	Programmers-3
Aquattack (aka アクゥアタック)	1984	Horizontal shooter	✓	✓	✓	✓	interphase	Toshiba-EMI
Aramo (aka アラモ)	1986	Action-RPG	✗	✓	✓	✓	Sein Soft	Sein Soft
Arctic Fox	1989	Action	✓	✓	✓	✓	Electronic Arts	Dro Soft
Arctic: Advanced Rail Track (aka アークテック)	1989	Puzzle	✗	✓	✓	✓	Artdink	Pony Canyon
The Archers	1985	Adventure	✓	✓	✓	✓	Level 9 Computing	Mosaic Publishing
Arcus	1988	Adventure	✗	✓	✓	✓	Wolfteam	Wolfteam
Arcus II: Silent Symphony	1989	Adventure	✗	✓	✓	✓	Wolfteam	Wolfteam
Arcusyu: Arcus Arch	1990	Adventure	✗	✓	✓	✓	Wolfteam	Wolfteam
Are Ya Profiting? Not Bad!	1986	Scrolling platformer	✓	✓	✓	✓	Leben Pro	Leben Pro
Arix	?	Action	✓	✓	✓	✓	Grupo de Trabajo Software (G.T.S.)	Grupo de Trabajo Software (G.T.S.)
Arkanoid	1986	Block breaker	✓	✓	✓	✓	Taito	Nidecom
Arkanoid II: Revenge of Doh	1988	Block breaker	✓	✓	✓	✓	Taito	Nidecom
Arkos	1988	Horizontal shooter	✓	✓	✓	✓	Arcadia Soft	Arcadia Soft
Army Moves	1987	Horizontal shooter	✓	✓	✓	✓	Dinamic	Dinamic
Arquímedes XXI	1986	Interactive fiction	✓	✓	✓	✓	Egroj	Dinamic
AshGuine (aka 伝説の聖戦士アシュギーネ)	1987	Hack and slash	✗	✓	✓	✓	Bit^{2}	Panasoft
AshGuine Story II (aka アシュギーネ虚空の牙城)	1987		✗	✓	✓	✓	T&E Soft	Panasoft
AshGuine Story III (aka アシュギーネ復讐の炎)	1987	Action-RPG	✗	✓	✓	✓	Microcabin	Panasoft
Aspar GP Master	1988	Racing - Motorcycle	✓	✓	✓	✓	Dinamic	Dinamic
Astro Blaster	1988	Horizontal shooter	✓	✓	✓	✓	Eurosoft	Premium III Software Distribution
Astro Plumber	1985	Platformer	✓	✓	✓	✓	Blue Ribbon Software	Blue Ribbon Software
Astro Rocks	1984	Obstacle avoiding	✓	✓	✓	✓	Kuma Computers	Kuma Computers
Astron Belt	1984	Obstacle avoiding	✓	✓	✓	✓	SEGA	LaserDisc Corporation
Astro Marine Corps (A.M.C.)	1989	Run and gun	✓	✓	✓	✓	Dinamic	Dinamic
Athletic Ball (aka. Ghost Flipper)	1984	Action	✓	✓	✓	✓	ASCII Corporation	ASCII Corporation
Athletic Land	1984	Jump and run	✓	✓	✓	✓	Konami	Konami
Attacco a New York Slot	1987	Casino / Slot	✓	✓	✓	✓	Philips Italy	Philips Italy
Attack Four	1986	Sports - Volleyball	✓	✓	✓	✓	Pax Softonica	Pax Softonica
Attack of the Killer Tomatoes	1986	Isometric platformer	✓	✓	✓	✓	Global Software	Global Software
Attacked	1989	Vehicular combat - Aircraft	✓	✓	✓	✓	Tynesoft	Micro Value
Aura Battler Dunbine	1991	RPG	✗	✓	✓	✓	Family Soft	Family Soft
Auf Wiedersehen Monty	1987	Platform-adventure	✓	✓	✓	✓	Peter Harrap	Gremlin Graphics
Autocrash	1991	Vehicular combat - Car	✗	✓	✓	✓	Zigurat	Zigurat
Avenida Paulista	1986	Interactive fiction	✓	✓	✓	✓	Sysout	Sysout
Aventuras Dinamic	1989	Interactive fiction	✓	✓	✓	✓	Aventuras AD	Dinamic
Averno	1987		✓	✓	✓	✓	PJ Soft	PJ Soft
Avventure	1991	Adventure (All)	✓	✓	✓	✓	Gruppo Editoriale Jackson	Gruppo Editoriale Jackson
Aya chan Suplex 1 (aka あやちゃんすうぷれっくすI)	?	Adventure	✗	✓	✓	✓	Panic Studio	Panic Studio
Ayayo's After Five (aka はっちゃけあやよさん)	1989	Adventure	✗	✓	✓	✓	HARD	HARD
AYAYO's Love Affair - I don't have a holiday (aka はっちゃけあやよさんIIいけないホリディ)	1990	Adventure	✗	✓	✓	✓	HARD	Gun Deck
B.C.'s Quest For Tires	1985	Vertical scroller/Obstacle avoiding	✓	✓	✓	✓	Sydney Development Corp	Toshiba-EMI
B.C.'s Quest For Tires II - Grog's Revenge	1985	Obstacle avoiding	✓	✓	✓	✓	Sierra	U.S. Gold
Babbulkund 1999 (aka バブルクンド1999)	1984	Strategy	✓	✓	✓	✓	Hudson Soft	Hudson Soft
Back 1 (aka عودة)	1988	Action	✓	✓	✓	✓	Methali	Methali
Back to the Future (aka バックトゥザフューチャー)	1985	Jump and run	✓	✓	✓	✓	Pony Canyon	Pony Canyon
Back to the Future Adventure (aka バックトゥザフューチャー アドベンチャー)	1986	Adventure	✗	✓	✓	✓	Pony Canyon	Pony Canyon
Back★gammon	1984	Board game - Backgammon	✓	✓	✓	✓	Tecno Soft	Tecno Soft
Backgammon	1984	Board game - Backgammon	✓	✓	✓	✓	Electric Software	Electric Software
Badlands	1984	Obstacle avoiding	✓	✓	✓	✓	Konami	LaserDisc Corporation
Ballblazer	1987	Obstacle avoiding	✓	✓	✓	✓	Mr. Micro	Activision
Ballblazer (MSX2)	1988	Obstacle avoiding	✗	✓	✓	✓	Mr. Micro	Activision
Ballyhoo	1986	Interactive fiction	✓	✓	✓	✓	Infocom	Infocom
Balance	1985	Puzzle - Math	✓	✓	✓	✓	HAL Laboratory	HAL Laboratory
Balance of Power (aka バランス・オブ・パワー)	1988	Simulator - Geopolitics	✗	✓	✓	✓	ASCII Corporation	ASCII Corporation
Banana	1984	Action	✓	✓	✓	✓	Studio GEN	ASCII Corporation
Banderas de Europa	1984	Simulator - Geopolitics	✓	✓	✓	✓	Ace Software S.A.	Advance
Bandit Kings of Ancient China	1989	Turn-based strategy	✗	✓	✓	✓	KOEI	KOEI
Bang! Bang!	1985	Shooter	✓	✓	✓	✓	Ample Software	Mitsubishi Electric Corporation
Bank Buster	1988	Action	✗	✓	✓	✓	Methodic Solutions	Methodic Solutions
Bank Panic	1986	Shooter	✓	✓	✓	✓	Sanritsu	Sega
Barbarian	1988	Action-adventure	✓	✓	✓	✓	Icon Design	Mastertronic
Barbarian II	1988	Action-adventure	✓	✓	✓	✓	Palace Software	Erbe Software
Barn Stormer	1985	Action	✓	✓	✓	✓	Electric Software	Electric Software
Barna Basket	1988	Sports - Basketball	✓	✓	✓	✓	Barnajoc	MSX Club (ES)
Barq Games (aka العاب برق)	1988	Variety	✓	✓	✓	✓	Barq	Barq
Barunba	1990	Shooter	✗	✓	✓	✓	ZAP	Namco
Baseball (aka ベースボール)	1985	Sports - Baseball	✓	✓	✓	✓	Pax Softonica	Pax Softonica
Baseball Craze (aka 野球狂)	1985	Sports - Baseball	✓	✓	✓	✓	Hudson Soft	Hudson Soft
Bastard (aka バスタード)	1987	RPG	✗	✓	✓	✓	Zainsoft	Zainsoft
Batman	1986	Isometric platformer	✓	✓	✓	✓	Jon Ritman	Ocean Software
Batman: The Movie	1989	Action-platformer	✓	✓	✓	✓	Ocean Software	Ocean Software
Battle Chopper	1987	Rail shooter	✓	✓	✓	✓	S. Davies	Methodic Solutions
Battle Cross	1984	Fixed shooter	✓	✓	✓	✓	Omori Electric Company	Sony
Battle For Midway	1985	Strategy - Wargame	✓	✓	✓	✓	Len Nicholson	PSS
Battle Mecha Xabungle: Blue Gale Part 1 (aka 戦闘メカザブングル ブ BLUE GALE PART1)	1984	Strategy - Wargame	✓	✓	✓	✓	Pony Canyon	Pony Canyon
Battle Ship Clapton II	1984	Vertical shooter	✓	✓	✓	✓	T&E Soft	T&E Soft
Be! Girl	1988	Adventure	✗	✓	✓	✓	Bond Soft	Bond Soft
Beach-Head	1985	Fixed shooter	✓	✓	✓	✓	Access Software	Eaglesoft
Beast	1991	Adventure	✗	✓	✓	✓	Birdy software	Birdy software
Beast 2	1992	Adventure	✗	✓	✓	✓	Birdy software	Birdy software
Bee & Flower	1983	Action	✓	✓	✓	✓	Think Soft	Think Soft
Beamrider	1985	Vertical shooter	✓	✓	✓	✓	Dave Rolfe	Activision
Believe it or not (aka صدق أو لا تصدق)	1990	Educational	✓	✓	✓	✓	Al Alamiah	Al Alamiah
Berlin	1985	Vehicular combat - Aircraft	✓	✓	✓	✓	Omega system	Omega system
Best Nine Professional Baseball (aka 野球狂)	1986	Sports - Baseball	✗	✓	✓	✓	ASCII Corporation	ASCII Corporation
Bestial Warrior	1989	Action-platformer	✓	✓	✓	✓	Zeus Soft	Dinamic
Binary Land (aka 新ベストナインプロ野球)	1986	Puzzle - Action puzzle	✗	✓	✓	✓	Hudson Soft	Honeybee Soft
Birdie Try	1985	Sports - Golf	✓	✓	✓	✓	Compile	Victor Co. of Japan (JVC)
Birdy World	1992	Adventure	✗	✓	✓	✓	Birdy software	Birdy software
Bishoujo Yakyuuken (aka 美少女野球拳)	1989	Action game	✗	✓	✓	✓	System House Oh!	System House Oh!
Bit Byter	1984	Vertical shooter	✓	✓	✓	✓	Monacor Electronic	Spectravideo
The Black Bass	1986	Simulator - Fishing	✓	✓	✓	✓	GA-Yume	HOT - B
Black Beard	1988	Action-adventure	✓	✓	✓	✓	Topo Soft	Kixx
Black Jack	1984	Card game - Blackjack	✓	✓	✓	✓	DIMensionNEW	Idealogic
The Black Onyx	1985	RPG/First-person maze	✓	✓	✓	✓	Bullet Proof Software	ASCII Corporation
The Black Onyx II (aka ザ・ブラックオニキスII)	1986	Rpg	✓	✓	✓	✓	Bullet Proof Software	ASCII Corporation
Blagger	1983	Single-screen platformer	✓	✓	✓	✓	Antony Crowther	Alligata
Blasteroids	1987	Multidirectional shooter - Asteroids	✓	✓	✓	✓	Image Works	Image Works
Blitz	1985	Action game	✓	✓	✓	✓	Omega system	Omega system
Block Terminator	1988	Block breaker	✓	✓	✓	✓	Harmonics	DOTT Plan
Blockade Runner	1984	Obstacle avoiding	✓	✓	✓	✓	Interphase	Toshiba-EMI
Blocker	1985	Action game	✓	✓	✓	✓	Grupo de Trabajo Software (G.T.S.)	Sygran, S.A.
Bloody	1988	Obstacle avoiding	✓	✓	✓	✓	P.J. Soft	P.J. Soft
Blow Up	1988	Rocks and diamonds	✓	✓	✓	✓	Eurosoft	Eurosoft
BMX Number Jump (aka BMX Rekencross)	1985	Educational/Maze	✓	✓	✓	✓	Longman/Vifi International	Malmberg
BMX Simulator	1986	Sports - BMX	✓	✓	✓	✓	Codemasters	Codemasters
Boa	1985	Action game	✓	✓	✓	✓	Dynadata	Dynadata
Boardello	1985	Board game - Reversi	✓	✓	✓	✓	Bubble Bus	Bubble Bus
Bob-007	1986	Action	✓	✓	✓	✓	Genesis Software	Genesis Software
Body Inspection in Belloncho (aka ベロンチョ身体検査)	1987	Action-RPG	✗	✓	✓	✓	HARD	Gun Deck
Boggy'84	1984	Platformer	✓	✓	✓	✓	Nippon Columbia	Nippon Columbia
Boing Boing (aka Fraction Fever)	1985	Platformer/Puzzle - Math	✓	✓	✓	✓	Spinnaker Software	Idealogic
Bokosuka Wars (aka ボコスカウォーズ)	1984	Strategy	✓	✓	✓	✓	ASCII Software	ASCII Software
Bombardeo en Nueva York	1984	Action game	✓	✓	✓	✓	Dynadata	Dynadata
Bomber King (aka ボンバーキング)	1988	Maze	✓	✓	✓	✓	Hudson Soft	Hudson Soft
Bomber Man (aka ボンバーマン)	1983	Maze	✓	✓	✓	✓	Hudson Soft	Honeybee Soft
Bomberman Special (aka ボンバーマンスペシャル)	1986	Maze	✓	✓	✓	✓	Hudson Soft	Honeybee Soft
Boogaboo (The Flea)	1986	Platformer	✓	✓	✓	✓	Indescomp	Indescomp
Boogie Woogi Jungle	1983	Action-platformer	✓	✓	✓	✓	Ample Software	Ample Software
Boom	1984	Fixed shooter - Galaxian	✓	✓	✓	✓	Aackosoft	Eaglesoft
Boomerang	1984	Action	✓	✓	✓	✓	ASCII Corporation	ASCII Corporation
Booty	1988		✓	✓	✓	✓	Eurosoft	Eurosoft
Bop!	1986	Action	✓	✓	✓	✓	Colin Jones	Mar'z Project
Borfesu and Five Spirits (aka ボルフェスと5人の悪魔)	1987	Action-RPG	✓	✓	✓	✓	XtalSoft	XtalSoft
Bosconian	1984	Multidirectional shooter	✓	✓	✓	✓	Namco	Namco
The Boss	1987	Simulation/Sport management	✓	✓	✓	✓	Peaksoft	Peaksoft
Bouken Roman	1986	Action-adventure	✓	✓	✓	✓	SystemSoft	SystemSoft
Boulder Dash (aka チャンピオンバルダーダッシュ)	1985	Rocks and diamonds	✓	✓	✓	✓	First Star Software	Aackosoft
Boulder Dash II - Rockfort's Riot	1986	Rocks and diamonds	✓	✓	✓	✓	First Star Software	Aackosoft
Bounce	1987	Block breaker	✓	✓	✓	✓	Double Brain!	Eaglesoft
Bouncing Block (aka Igloo)	1985	Maze	✓	✓	✓	✓	Idealogic	Idealogic
Bounder	1985	Vertical scroller/Obstacle avoiding	✓	✓	✓	✓	Gremlin Graphics	Gremlin Graphics
The Brain (aka ザ・ブレイン)	1983	Memory game	✓	✓	✓	✓	ASCII Software	ASCII Software
Break Out	1983	Block breaker	✓	✓	✓	✓	ASCII Software	ASCII Software
Break In (aka ブレイクイン)	1987	Block breaker	✓	✓	✓	✓	Simon Davies	Bytebusters, Jaleco
Breaker (Radarsoft)	1987	Block breaker	✓	✓	✓	✓	Radarsoft	Radarsoft
Breaker (ELS) (aka ブレイカー)	1989	RPG	✗	✓	✓	✓	ELS	Jast
Breaker Breaker	1988	Block breaker	✓	✓	✓	✓	Eurosoft	System 4
Breakout! The Great Computer Adventure	1985	Block breaker	✓	✓	✓	✓	Toshiba-EMI	Toshiba-EMI
Brian Clough's Football Fortunes	1987	Simulator - Manager/Sports - Soccer	✓	✓	✓	✓	CDS Software	CDS Software
Brian Jacks Superstar Challenge	1986	Sports	✓	✓	✓	✓	Martech	Martech
The Brick	1989	Arcade/Break-out	✓	✓	✓	✓	Diabolic	Diabolic
Brick Breaker (aka The Breaker)	1987	Block breaker	✓	✓	✓	✓	Juliet Software	Juliet Software
Bride of Space-Time (ala 時空の花嫁)	1989	Action	✗	✓	✓	✓	Kogado Studio	Kogado Studio
Bridge (Nice Ideas)	1984	Card game - Bridge	✓	✓	✓	✓	Nice Ideas	Infogrames
Bridge (Transition Software)	1985	Card game - Bridge	✓	✓	✓	✓	Bridge Soft	Kuma Computers
Bridge Spelenderwijs	1986	Card game - Bridge	✓	✓	✓	✓	Transition Software	Philips
Bronx	1989	Fighting	✓	✓	✓	✓	Animagic	MCM Software
Bruce Lee	1985	Beat 'em up/Platformer	✓	✓	✓	✓	Datasoft	Comptiq
Bubble Bobble (aka バブルボブル)	1987	Action-platformer	✗	✓	✓	✓	Taito	Taito
Bubbler	1987	Isometric platformer	✓	✓	✓	✓	A.C.G.	Ultimate Play The Game
Buck Rogers: Planet of Zoom	1983		✓	✓	✓	✓	Sega	Sega
Budokan	1989	Fighting - Martial arts	✓	✓	✓	✓	Electronic Arts	Dro Soft
Bug Bomb (aka ゴキブリ大作戦)	1983	Fixed shooter	✓	✓	✓	✓	Magicsoft	National
Buggy Ranger	1990	Vertical scroller	✓	✓	✓	✓	Dinamic	Dinamic
Bumpy	1989	Single-screen platformer	✓	✓	✓	✓	Loriciels	Proein Soft Line
Burai	1989	Action-RPG	✗	✗	✓	✓	Riverhill Soft	Riverhill Soft
Burai II: The Concluding Chapter	1992	Action-RPG	✗	✗	✓	✓	Riverhill Soft	Brother Industries
Buran	1990	Flight Simulator	✓	✓	✓	✓	OMK Software	Proein Soft Line
Burger Time (aka バーガータイムハンバーガー)	1986	Single-screen platformer - Burger Time	✓	✓	✓	✓	Data East	Dempa Micomsoft
Burgerkill (aka Mac Attack)	1986	Single-screen platformer - Burger Time	✓	✓	✓	✓	The Bytebusters	Eaglesoft
Buster Block	1985	Maze	✓	✓	✓	✓	Stephen Wallis	Kuma Computers
Busy Rainy Day Super Doors	1989	Puzzle	✓	✓	✓	✓	Hudson Soft	Hudson Soft
Butamaru Pants (aka ぶた丸パンツ)	1983	Action	✓	✓	✓	✓	Yanada	HAL Laboratory
Butsukekko	1983	Action	✓	✓	✓	✓	Central education	Central education
Buzo	1987	Action	✓	✓	✓	✓	Edisoft	Edisoft
Buzz Off	1984	Action	✓	✓	✓	✓	Electric Software	Electric Software
Bye-Bye Jupiter	1984	Action	✓	✓	✓	✓	Pony Canyon	Pony Canyon
Bytebusters	1985	Fixed shooter - Space Invaders	✓	✓	✓	✓	Ben Kokx	Aackosoft
C-So! (aka シーソー)	1985	Single-screen platformer	✓	✓	✓	✓	Compile	Pony Canyon
Cabbage Patch Kids	1984	Jump and run	✓	✓	✓	✓	Konami	Konami
CAL	1991	Adventure game / Adult	✗	✓	✓	✓	Birdy Software	Birdy Software
CAL II	1991	Adventure game / Adult	✗	✓	✓	✓	Birdy Software	Birdy Software
California Games	1987	Sports	✓	✓	✓	✓	Epyx	Erbe Software
Camelot Warriors	1986	Action-platformer	✓	✓	✓	✓	Dinamic	Dinamic
Can Can Bunny Spirits	1991	Adventure game / Adult	✗	✓	✓	✓	Cocktail Soft	Cocktail Soft
Can Can Bunny Superior	1990	Adventure game / Adult	✗	✓	✓	✓	Cocktail Soft	Cocktail Soft
Can Of Worms	1986	Puzzle game	✓	✓	✓	✓	Livewire	Livewire
Candoo Ninja	1983	Jump and run	✓	✓	✓	✓	Mass Tael	ASCII Corporation
Cannon Ball (aka Bubble Buster)	1983	Fixed shooter	✓	✓	✓	✓	Hudson Soft	Honeybee Soft/Aackosoft
Cannon Fighter	1984	Fixed shooter - Base defense	✓	✓	✓	✓	Policy	Morwood Software
Capitan Sevilla	1988	Platformer	✓	✓	✓	✓	Dinamic	Dinamic
Captain Chef (aka キャプテンシェフ)	1984	Maze	✓	✓	✓	✓	Nippon Columbia	Colpax
Captain Cosmo	1984	Horizontal shooter	✓	✓	✓	✓	NEXA	ASCII Corporation
Car Fighter (aka カーファイター)	1985	Vehicular combat - Car	✓	✓	✓	✓	Casio	Casio
Car Jamboree (aka 爆走スタントレーシング)	1985	Vehicular combat - Car	✓	✓	✓	✓	Omoro Electric Company	Sony
Car Race	1983	Racing/Vertical scroller	✓	✓	✓	✓	Ample Software	Ample Software
Carlos Sainz - Campeonato del Mundo de Rallies	1990	Racing	✓	✓	✓	✓	Zigurat	Zigurat
Carr-2000	1986	Racing	✓	✓	✓	✓	Grupo de Trabajo Software (G.T.S.)	Sygran, S.A.
Carry's Great Escape (aka 大脱走)	1985	Maze	✓	✓	✓	✓	Carry Lab	Carry Lab
Casanova	1989	Platform-adventure	✓	✓	✓	✓	Iber Soft	MCM Software
Casio World Open	1985	Sports - Golf	✓	✓	✓	✓	Boram Soft	Casio
The Castle (aka ザ・キャッスル)	1985	Platform-adventure	✓	✓	✓	✓	ASCII Corporation	ASCII Corporation
Castle Blackstar	1986	Adventure game	✓	✓	✓	✓	CDS Software	CDS Software
Castle Combat	1985	Vertical shooter	✓	✓	✓	✓	Spectravideo	Spectravideo
Castle Excellent	1986	Platform-adventure	✓	✓	✓	✓	ASCII Corporation	ASCII Corporation
Castle of Blackburn	1989		✗	✓	✓	✓	Topsoft	Topsoft
Catch That Girl	1986	Action - Timing	✓	✓	✓	✓	Psycho-Soft	WB-Soft
Cave Adventure	1984	Adventure game	✓	✓	✓	✓	Ample Software	Mitsubishi Electric Corporation
Cavern of Death	1987	Action game	✓	✓	✓	✓	Juliet Software	Discovery Informatic
Cazador de Tiburones	1985	Simulation video game	✓	✓	✓	✓	Monser	Monser
Cetus	1986	Vertical shooter	✓	✓	✓	✓	Tynesoft	Tynesoft
Chack'n Pop	1984	Single-screen platformer/Puzzle	✓	✓	✓	✓	Taito	Nidecom
Challenge Derby (aka チャレンジダービー)	1985	Sports - Horse racing	✓	✓	✓	✓	Pony Canyon	Pony Canyon
Champion Boxing	1985	Sports - Boxing	✓	✓	✓	✓	Sega	Pony Canyon
Champion Ice Hockey (aka チャンピオンアイスホッケー)	1985	Sports - Hockey	✓	✓	✓	✓	Sega	Pony Canyon
Champion Kendo (aka チャンピオン剣道)	1987	Sports - Kendo	✓	✓	✓	✓	SEGA	Pony Canyon
Champion Pro Wrestling	1985	Sports - Pro Wrestling	✓	✓	✓	✓	Sega	Sega
Champion Soccer	1985	Sports - Soccer	✓	✓	✓	✓	SEGA	Pony Canyon
Champions (aka チャンピオンズ)	1984	Sports - Horse racing	✓	✓	✓	✓	Pony Canyon	Pony Canyon
Championship Lode Runner (aka チャンピオンシップロードランナー)	1985	Single-screen platformer/Puzzle	✓	✓	✓	✓	Programmers-3	Sony/Prosoft
Chaos Angels	1989	RPG / Adult	✗	✓	✓	✓	ASCII Corporation	ASCII Corporation
Chase H.Q.	1989	Racing/Vertical scroller	✓	✓	✓	✓	Ocean Software	Ocean Software
Checkers in Tan Tan Tanuki	1985	Maze	✓	✓	✓	✓	Pony Canyon	Pony Canyon
Checkmate! First Moves in Chess	1985	Board game - Chess	✓	✓	✓	✓	Toshiba	Toshiba
Chess	1984	Board game - Chess	✓	✓	✓	✓	Sapporo	B. U. G.
The Chess Game	1985	Board game - Chess	✓	✓	✓	✓	C. A. Thornton	Eaglesoft
The Chess Game 2	1986	Board games	✓	✓	✓	✓	The Bytebusters	Eaglesoft
Chess Master	1985	Board game - Chess	✓	✓	✓	✓		Philips
Chess Player	1988	Board game - Chess	✓	✓	✓	✓	Eurosoft	Premium III Software Distribution
Chessmaster 2000	1986	Board game - Chess	✓	✓	✓	✓	Drosoft	The Software Toolworks
Chicago	1987	Card video game	✗	✓	✓	✓	Data Beutner	Stone Castle
Chicago's 30	1988	Horizontal shooter	✓	✓	✓	✓	Topo Soft	U.S. Gold
Chick Fighter (aka ヒヨコファイター) (aka Hiyoko Fighter)	1983	Action	✓	✓	✓	✓	Hudson Soft	Honeybee Soft
Chicken Chase	1986	Action	✓	✓	✓	✓	Jawx	Bug-Byte Software
Chiemi Hori Strawberry Puzzle	1984	Puzzle game	✓	✓	✓	✓	Pony Canyon	Pony Canyon
Chiller	1985	Single-screen platformer	✓	✓	✓	✓	Mastertronic	Mastertronic
Chima Chima	1985	Action/Maze	✓	✓	✓	✓	Alex Bros	Bothtec
Chinyato kun Game	1990	Adventure game	✗	✓	✓	✓	Panic Studio	Panic Studio
Choplifter	1985	Horizontal shooter	✓	✓	✓	✓	Compile	Sony
Chopper	1986	Isometric shooter	✓	✓	✓	✓	The Bytebusters	Eaglesoft
Chopper II	1986	Action Game	✗	✓	✓	✓	The Bytebusters	Eaglesoft
Chopper One	1988	Isometric shooter	✓	✓	✓	✓	Eurosoft	Premium III Software
Choro Q (aka チョロQ)	1984	Action-platformer	✓	✓	✓	✓	Taito	Nidecom (Japan) / Electric Software (Europe)
Chotto Meitantei ~Misa-chan Monogatari Series	1988	Visual novel	✗	✓	✓	✓	Champion Soft	Champion Soft
Choy-Lee-Fut Kung-Fu Warrior	1990	Beat 'em up	✓	✓	✓	✓	Positive Software	Positive Software
Chubby Gristle	1988	Platformer	✓	✓	✓	✓	Teque Software	Grandslam Entertainments
Chuck Yeager's Advanced Flight Trainer	1989	Flight Simulator	✓	✓	✓	✓	Electronic Arts	Dro Soft
Chuckie Egg	1985	Single-screen platformer	✓	✓	✓	✓	A&F Software	A&F Software
Cinderella Perudue	1987	Adventure game	✗	✓	✓	✓	Studio ANGEL	Studio ANGEL
Circus Charlie	1984	Platformer	✓	✓	✓	✓	Konami	Konami
City Connection	1986	Platformer	✓	✓	✓	✓	Nippon Dexter	Jaleco
City Fight	1986	Strategy video game	✗	✓	✓	✓	TSR, Inc.	Pony Canyon
Ci-U-Than Trilogy I: La Diosa de Cozumel	1990	Interactive fiction	✓	✓	✓	✓	Adventuras AD	Adventuras AD
Ci-U-Than Trilogy II: Los Templos Sagrados	1991	Interactive fiction	✓	✓	✓	✓	Adventuras AD	Adventuras AD
Ci-U-Than Trilogy III: Chichen Itza	1992	Interactive fiction	✓	✓	✓	✓	Adventuras AD	Adventuras AD
Classic Adventure	1986	Interactive Fiction	✓	✓	✓	✓	Melbourne House	Melbourne House
Clever & Smart (aka Mortadelo y Filemón)	1988	Action game	✓	✓	✓	✓	Magic Bytes	Dro Soft
Clever & Smart II (aka Mortadelo y Filemón II - Safari callejero)	1989	Action game	✓	✓	✓	✓	Animagic	Dro Soft
Cloud Master	1988		✗	✓	✓	✓	HOT - B	HOT - B
Cluedo	1986	Board game - Cluedo	✓	✓	✓	✓	Leisure Genius	Leisure Genius
Coaster Race (aka コースターレース)	1986	Racing	✓	✓	✓	✓	Sony	Sony
Cobra's Arc	1987	Graphic adventure	✓	✓	✓	✓	Luis Mezquita	Dinamic
The Cockpit (aka ザ・コックピット)	1987	Flight Simulator	✗	✓	✓	✓	Nidecom	Nidecom
Coco Castle (aka En la edad media)	1984	Platformer	✓	✓	✓	✓	Kuma Computers	Kuma Computers
Coconut Jump	1985	Action game	✓	✓	✓	✓	Ace Software S.A.	Advance
Coconuts	1985	Action game	✓	✓	✓	✓	Anaya Multimedia / Vifi International	Sony Spain
Cocos	1984	Action game	✓	✓	✓	✓	J. Sánchez Armas	Advance
Code Breaker	1985	Puzzle game	✓	✓	✓	✓	Visiogame	Visiogame
Coliseum	1988	Racing - Chariot	✓	✓	✓	✓	Topo Soft	Kixx
Colony	1987	Base building	✓	✓	✓	✓	Icon Design	Mastertronic
Color Ball	1984	Action - Timing	✓	✓	✓	✓	Hudson Soft	Hudson Soft
Color Midway	1983	Vertical shooter	✓	✓	✓	✓	Magicsoft	National
Colossal Adventure	1986	Interactive fiction	✓	✓	✓	✓	CDS Software	CDS Software
Colossus Chess 4	1984	Board game - Chess	✓	✓	✓	✓	Level 9 Computing	Level 9 Computing
Colt 36	1987	Run and gun	✓	✓	✓	✓	Topo Soft	Topo Soft
Columns	1990	Tile-matching	✗	✓	✓	✓	Compile	Telenet Japan
Comando Quatro	1989	Platformer	✓	✓	✓	✓	Gamesoft	Zigurat
Comando Tracer	1989	Horizontal shooter	✓	✓	✓	✓	Zeus Soft	Dinamic
Comblot	1985	Card game	✓	✓	✓	✓	Eric von Ascheberg	Sprites
Come On!	1984	Action game	✓	✓	✓	✓	Hudson Soft	Hudson Soft
Come On! Picot	1986	Platform-adventure	✓	✓	✓	✓	Pony Canyon	Pony Canyon
Comecocos	1985	Maze - Pac-Man	✓	✓	✓	✓	Idealogic	Idealogic
Comet Tail	1984	Action - Tron/Snake	✓	✓	✓	✓	ASCII Corporation	ASCII Corporation
Comic Bakery	1984	Action	✓	✓	✓	✓	Konami	Konami
Computer Billiards	1983	Cue sports	✓	✓	✓	✓	Konami	Sony
Computer Othello (aka コンピューターオセロ)	1984	Board game - Othello	✓	✓	✓	✓	Sony	Sony
Computer Scrabble	1987	Board game - Scrabble	✓	✓	✓	✓	Leisure Genius	Leisure Genius
Con-dori	1983	Action	✓	✓	✓	✓	Cross Talk	Cross Talk
Confused?	1983	Puzzle - Moving tiles	✓	✓	✓	✓	The Bytebusters	Eaglesoft
Congo	1986	Puzzle	✓	✓	✓	✓	D. H. Ibbotson	Livewire Software
Congo Bongo	1983	Isometric platformer	✓	✓	✓	✓	Sega	Sega
Conquest	1988	Board game / Adult	✗	✓	✓	✓	Nichibutsu	Nichibutsu
Construction Tool Mr. Maze	1989	Puzzle game	✗	✓	✓	✓	Reno / Atlus	Telenet Japan
Continental	1992	RPG	✗	✓	✓	✓	Technopolis Soft	Technopolis Soft
Continental Circus	1989	Racing	✓	✓	✓	✓	Taito	New Frontier
Contra	1989	Run and gun	✗	✓	✓	✓	Konami	Konami
Contract Bridge	1984	Card game - Bridge	✓	✓	✓	✓	Alligata	Alligata
Coquettish Girl Noriko Part 1	1988	Visual Novel	✗	✓	✓	✓	System House Oh!	System House Oh!
Corro de Formas	1985	Maze Game	✓	✓	✓	✓	Anaya Multimedia / Vifi International	Sony Spain
Corsarios	1989	Beat 'em up	✓	✓	✓	✓	Opera Soft	Opera Soft
Cosa Nostra	1986	Run and gun	✓	✓	✓	✓	Opera Soft	Opera Soft
Cosmic Psycho	1991	Adventure game	✗	✓	✓	✓	Cocktail Soft	Cocktail Soft
Cosmic Sheriff	1989	Action game	✗	✓	✓	✓	Dinamic	Dinamic
Cosmic Shock Absorber	1986	Rail shooter	✓	✓	✓	✓	Chris Fayers	Software Communications
Cosmic Soldier (aka コズミックソルジャー)	1985	RPG	✗	✓	✓	✓	Kogado Studio	ASCII Corporation
Cosmo Explorer	1985	Multidirectional shooter/Base-building game	✓	✓	✓	✓	ZAP	Sony
Cosmo Traveler (aka コスモトラベラー)	1984	Vertical shooter	✓	✓	✓	✓	Apollo Technica	Apollo Technica
Cosmos Circuit	1985	Racing game	✓	✓	✓	✓	LaserDisc Corporation	LaserDisc Corporation
Cosmos Club (aka コスモスクラブ)	1989	Graphic adventure	✗	✓	✓	✓	JAST	JAST
Courageous Perseus	1985	Action-adventure/Maze	✓	✓	✓	✓	Cosmos Computer	Cosmos Computer
Cow-Boys	1987	Action game	✓	✓	✓	✓	A.G.D.	Sygran, S.A.
Crashball	1988	Action game	✓	✓	✓	✓	Halley Software	Halley Software
Craze	1988	Multidirectional shooter	✓	✓	✓	✓	Heart Soft	Heart Soft
Crazy Bullet (aka クレージーブレット)	1983	Vehicular combat - Tank	✓	✓	✓	✓	ASCII Corporation	ASCII Corporation
Crazy Cars	1988	Racing	✓	✓	✓	✓	Titus	Titus
Crazy Fruit	1992	Visual novel	✗	✓	✓	✓	Fairytale	Fairytale
Crazy Golf	1984	Sports - Golf	✓	✓	✓	✓	Mr. Micro	Mr. Micro
Crazy Shogi	1985	Board game	✓	✓	✓	✓	Ving Soft	Ving Soft
Crazy Train	1983	Puzzle - Action puzzle	✓	✓	✓	✓	Konami	Sony
Creamy Lemon ‒ Star Trap	1987	Visual novel	✓	✓	✓	✓	Jast	Jast
Crescent Moon Girl (aka クレセントムーンがぁる)	1989	Adventure/Eroge	✗	✓	✓	✓	Alice Soft	Alice Soft
Cribbage	1984	Card game - Cribbage	✓	✓	✓	✓	Mike Shaw	Kuma Computers
Crimson (aka クリムゾン)	1988	JRPG	✗	✓	✓	✓	XtalSoft	Scaptrust
Crimson II	1989	JRPG	✗	✓	✓	✓	XtalSoft	XtalSoft
Crimson III	1990	JRPG	✗	✓	✓	✓	XtalSoft	XtalSoft
Cronos	1989	Obstacle avoiding	✓	✓	✓	✓	Jesus M. Montane	Barnajocs S.L.
Cross Blaim (aka クロスブレイム)	1986	Run and gun	✓	✓	✓	✓	dB-SOFT	dB-SOFT
The Crossing	1985	Adventure	✓	✓	✓	✓	Accion	Compulogical
Crossword (aka الكلمات المتقاطعة)	1985	Variety	✓	✓	✓	✓	Al Alamiah	Al Alamiah
Crusader (aka クルゼーダー)	1985	Action-platformer	✓	✓	✓	✓	Compile	Pony Canyon
Cryptic Cube	?	Puzzle game	✓	✓	✓	✓	Spectravideo (SVI)	Spectravideo (SVI)
Cuberty	?	Action game	✓	✓	✓	✓	GEASA	GEASA
Cubik (aka Cubo de Rubick)	1985	Puzzle - Cube	✓	✓	✓	✓	Juan Carlos Sacristan	Monster
Cubit	1989	Board game - 3D tic-tac-toe	✓	✓	✓	✓	Mr. Micro	Mr. Micro
Cubo Magico	1985	Puzzle - Cube	✓	✓	✓	✓	Club Sony MSX	Club Sony MSX
Curro Jiménez	1989	Run and gun	✓	✓	✓	✓	Arcadia Software	Zigurat
Custar	1985	Action game	✓	✓	✓	✓	HAL Laboratory	HAL Laboratory
Cyberbig	1989	Action-platformer	✓	✓	✓	✓	Animagic	Animagic
Cybernetic Hi-School Part 1 (aka 電脳学園シナリオ1)	1990	Adventure	✗	✓	✓	✓	Gainax	Gainax
Cybernetic Hi-School 2 - Highway Buster (aka 電脳学園シナリオ2ハイウェイバスター！！)	1990	Adventure	✗	✓	✓	✓	Gainax	Gainax
Cybernetic Hi-School 3 - Gunbuster, Aim for the Top! (aka 電脳学園シナリオ3トップをねらえ！)	1990	Adventure	✗	✓	✓	✓	Gainax	Gainax
Cyberun	1986	Horizontal shooter	✓	✓	✓	✓	A.C.G.	Ultimate Play The Game
Cyrus II	1986	Board game - Chess	✓	✓	✓	✓	Intelligent Chess Software	Alligata Software
D-Day	1984	Vertical shooter	✓	✓	✓	✓	Jaleco	Toshiba EMI
D-Dash	1988	Action game	✗	✓	✓	✓	Tecno Soft	Tecno Soft
D.P.S. Dream Program System	1989	Visual novel / Adult	✗	✓	✓	✓	Alice Soft	Alice Soft
D.P.S. Dream Program System SG	1990	Visual novel / Adult	✗	✓	✓	✓	Alice Soft	Alice Soft
D.P.S. Dream Program System SG Set 2	1991	Visual novel / Adult	✗	✓	✓	✓	Alice Soft	Alice Soft
D.P.S. Dream Program System SG Set 3	1991	Visual novel / Adult	✗	✓	✓	✓	Alice Soft	Alice Soft
Dacor	?	Puzzle video game	✗	✓	✓	✓	Data Beutner	Data Beutner
Daisenryaku	1986	Turn-based strategy	✗	✓	✓	✓	System Soft	Microcabin
Daisenryaku II – Campaign Version	1992	Turn-based strategy	✗	✓	✓	✓	System Soft	Microcabin
Daiva Story 4: Asura's Bloodfeud (aka ディーヴァアスラの血流)	1987	Strategy/Run and gun	✓	✓	✓	✓	T&E Soft	T&E Soft
Daiva Story 5: The Cup of Soma (aka ディーヴァソーマの杯)	1987	Strategy/Run and gun	✗	✓	✓	✓	T&E Soft	T&E Soft
Dam Buster	1986	Shooter game	✓	✓	✓	✓	Grupo de Trabajo Software (G.T.S.)	Grupo de Trabajo Software (G.T.S.)
Dam Busters	1985	Flight simulator	✓	✓	✓	✓	Comptiq	U.S. Gold
Damas	1985	Board game - Draughts	✓	✓	✓	✓	DIMensionNEW	Idealogic
Damspel	1988	Board game - Draughts	✓	✓	✓	✓	MSX Gids	MSX Gids
Danceroid (aka Танцроид)	1988	Maze	✓	✓	✓	✓	A.R. Crazysoft	A.R. Crazysoft
Danger Mouse in the Black Forest Chateau	1989	Adventure	✓	✓	✓	✓	Alternative Software	Alternative Software
Dangerous Cho-Han	1988	Gambling video game / Adult	✗	✓	✓	✓	Omega System	Omega System
Dangerous Tengu Legend	1990	Visual novel	✗	✓	✓	✓	Alice Soft	Alice Soft
Danger X4	1984	Horizontal shooter	✓	✓	✓	✓	ASCII Corporation	ASCII Corporation
Darkwood Manor	1985	Adventure game	✓	✓	✓	✓	Kuma Computers	Kuma Computers
Darts	1987	Sports - Darts	✓	✓	✓	✓	Blue Ribbon Software	Codemasters
Darwin 4078	1987	Vertical shooter	✗	✓	✓	✓	Data East Corp.	Hudson Soft
Data MSX Vol. I	1985	Variety	✓	✓	✓	✓	GEASA	GEASA
Data MSX Vol. II	?	Variety	✓	✓	✓	✓	GEASA	GEASA
Data MSX Vol. III	?	Variety	✓	✓	✓	✓	GEASA	GEASA
Data MSX Vol. IV	?	Variety	✓	✓	✓	✓	GEASA	GEASA
Data MSX Vol. IX	?	Variety	✓	✓	✓	✓	GEASA	GEASA
Data MSX Vol. XI	?	Variety	✓	✓	✓	✓	GEASA	GEASA
Data MSX Vol. XIII	?	Variety	✓	✓	✓	✓	GEASA	GEASA
David II	1984	Vertical shooter	✓	✓	✓	✓	Ample Software	ASCII Corporation
Dawn Patrol (aka ドーンパトロール)	1986	Vehicle simulation - Submarine	✓	✓	✓	✓	The Bytebuster	Eaglesoft
De Grotten van Oberon	1986	Action game	✓	✓	✓	✓	Radarsoft	Philips
De Sekte	1987	Adventure game	✗	✓	✓	✓	Radarsoft	Philips
Dead of the Brain	1992	Adventure game	✗	✓	✓	✓	Fairytale	Fairytale
DE・JA (aka デ・ジャ)	1990	Adventure/Eroge	✗	✓	✓	✓	ELF Corporation	ELF Corporation
Death House	1985	Adventure	✓	✓	✓	✓	Eric Mandrange	Eric Mandrange
Death Road	1986	Action game	✓	✓	✓	✓	Mind Games España	Mind Games España
Death Valley Gold Rush	1985		✓	✓	✓	✓	AA Software	Kuma Computers
Death Wish 3	1987	Run and gun/Maze	✓	✓	✓	✓	Gremlin Graphics	Gremlin Graphics
Decathlon	1984	Sports - Decathlon	✓	✓	✓	✓	Activision	Activision/Armati Soft
Deep Dungeon (aka ディープダンジョン魔洞戦記)	1987	RPG	✓	✓	✓	✓	Scaptrust	Scaptrust
Deep Dungeon II (aka ディープダンジョン勇士の紋章)	1988	RPG	✗	✓	✓	✓	Scaptrust	Scaptrust
Deep Forest	1987	Action-RPG	✗	✓	✓	✓	XAIN Soft	XAIN Soft
Defcom-1	1989	Vertical shooter	✓	✓	✓	✓	Iber Soft	Iber Soft
The Demon Crystal (aka デーモンクリスタル)	1986	Action-platformer	✓	✓	✓	✓	Dempa Micomsoft	Dempa Micomsoft
Demonia	1986	Jump and run	✓	✓	✓	✓	Claude Sablatou	Microids
Derringer	1988	Visual novel	✗	✓	✓	✓	Jast / Clest	Jast
Desolator	1986	Horizontal shooter	✓	✓	✓	✓	Gremlin Graphics	Gremlin Graphics
Desperado	1987	Vertical shooter	✓	✓	✓	✓	Topo Soft	Erbe Software
Desperado 2	1987	Run and gun	✓	✓	✓	✓	Topo Soft	Topo Soft
Destroyer	1986	Vertical shooter	✓	✓	✓	✓	Mind Games España	Mind Games España
Detective Daida Geki: President's Daughter Kidnapping Case	1987	Adventure game	✗	✓	✓	✓	Informercial	Informercial
Detective O. Welles	1986	Adventure game / Text & Gfx	✓	✓	✓	✓	Iveson Software	Sony Spain
Deus Ex Machina	1985	Art game	✓	✓	✓	✓	NU Wave UK	Mind Games España
Devil Golvellius	1987	Action RPG	✓	✓	✓	✓	Compile	Compile
Devil Zone	1989	Action game	✗	✓	✓	✓	Uttum	Uttum
The Devil's Castle	1985	Adventure	✓	✓	✓	✓	Manhattan Transfer	MSX Club (ES)
Devil's Heaven (aka デビルズ・ヘブン)	1984	Vertical shooter	✓	✓	✓	✓	Nisso	General (Paxon)
Dezeni Land	1984	Adventure game	✓	✓	✓	✓	Hudson Soft	Hudson Soft
Diable de Laplace	1989	RPG / Survival horror	✗	✓	✓	✓	Humming Bird Soft	Humming Bird Soft
Diablo	1989	Puzzle game	✗	✓	✓	✓	Brøderbund Japan	Brøderbund Japan
Dial Number	1985	Action game	✓	✓	✓	✓	Nippon Columbia	Colpax
Diamond Adventure	1983	Adventure game	✓	✓	✓	✓	Microcabin	Microcabin
Diamond Luis I	1986	Rocks and diamonds	✓	✓	✓	✓	Ikesoft	Ikesoft
Diamond Mine II	1986	Maze	✓	✓	✓	✓	Mike Williams	Blue Ribbon Software
Dig Dug	1984	Action - Digging	✓	✓	✓	✓	Namco	Namco
Digan's Magic Stone	1989	RPG	✗	✓	✓	✓	Artec	Artec
Digger	1987	Action game	✗	✓	✓	✓	Data Beutner	Stone Castle
Digital Devil Story: Megami Tensei (aka デジタル・デビル物語 女神転生)	1987	Maze	✓	✓	✓	✓	Namco	Namco
Dimensional Wars	1984	Action game	✓	✓	✓	✓	Hudson Soft	Hudson Soft
Dinamic 5 Aniversario	1988	Compilation	✓	✓	✓	✓	Dinamic	Dinamic
Dinamitero	1986	Shooter game	✓	✓	✓	✓	Grupo de Trabajo Software (G.T.S.)	Grupo de Trabajo Software (G.T.S.)
Dinner in the Morgue	?	Visual novel	✓	✓	✓	✓	Tokuma Shoten Intermedia	Tokuma Shoten Intermedia
Dios	1990	Unknown	✗	✓	✓	✓	Sein Soft / XAIN Soft / Zainsoft	Sein Soft / XAIN Soft / Zainsoft
Dip Dip	1985	Single-screen platformer	✓	✓	✓	✓	Indescomp	Microbyte
Disc Warrior	1985	Isometric platformer	✓	✓	✓	✓	Alligata	Alligata
Discovery	1988	Puzzle/Fixed shooter	✓	✓	✓	✓	Eurosoft	System 4
Disk Mystery#4 – The Man I Love	1988	Adventure game	✗	✓	✓	✓	Thinking Rabbit	Thinking Rabbit
Disk NG 2	1988	Shoot-'em-up (All)	✓	✓	✓	✓	Namco	Namco
Dizzy Ball (aka ディジーボール)	1984	Action	✓	✓	✓	✓	Pony Canyon	Pony Canyon
Dizzy Balloon (aka ディジーバルーン)	1984	Action	✓	✓	✓	✓	Pony Canyon	Pony Canyon
Dizzy Dice	1988	Casino games - Slots	✓	✓	✓	✓	Players	Players
Docteur Galaxie	1986	Horizontal Shooter	✓	✓	✓	✓	Frederic Puteaux	Micro-MSX
Doki Doki Card League	1990	Card battle / Adult	✗	✓	✓	✓	Artist Soft	Great
Doki Doki Penguin Land (aka どきどきペンギンランド)	1985	Platform-puzzle	✓	✓	✓	✓	Pony Canyon	Sega
Dokkin Minako Sensei!	1988	Visual novel	✗	✓	✓	✓	Tect House	Tect House
Dokkiri Submarine	1984	Action game	✓	✓	✓	✓	Marufune F.S.L	Marufune F.S.L
Dome	1989	Graphic adventure	✗	✓	✓	✓	System Sacom	System Sacom
Domino	1985	Tile game	✓	✓	✓	✓	DIMensionNEW	Idealogic
Dominoes	1986	Board game	✓	✓	✓	✓	Microteknix	Microteknix
Don Cayetano	1987	Unknown	✓	✓	✓	✓	Edisoft	Edisoft
Don Quijote	1988	Interactive fiction	✓	✓	✓	✓	Dinamic	Dinamic
Don't Melt Icecream	1984	Action game	✓	✓	✓	✓	Marufune F.S.L	Marufune F.S.L
Donkey Kong	1986	Single-screen platformer - Donkey Kong	✓	✓	✓	✓	Sentient Software	Ocean Software
Donpan	1983	Horizontal shooter	✓	✓	✓	✓	Tomy Company	Colpax
Door Door mkII (aka ドアドアmkII)	1985	Single-screen platformer	✓	✓	✓	✓	K. Nakamura	Enix
Dorodon (aka ドロドン)	1984	Maze	✓	✓	✓	✓	UPL	Sony
Double Dragon	1988	Beat 'em up	✓	✓	✓	✓	Melbourne House	Virgin Games
Double Dragon II	1989	Beat 'em up	✓	✓	✓	✓	Virgin Games	Dro Soft
The Double Vision - Beauty Girl Photo Studio (aka ダブルビジョン 美少女写真スタジオ)	1987	Visual Novel	✗	✓	✓	✓	HARD	HARD
Dr Jackle and Mr Wide	1987	Action-adventure/Maze	✓	✓	✓	✓	Mastertronic	Bulldog Software
Dr. Stop!	1992	Adventure/Eroge	✗	✓	✓	✓	Alice Soft	Alice Soft
Dragon Attack (aka ドラゴン・アタック)	1983	Fixed shooter - Space Invaders	✓	✓	✓	✓	Takara	HAL Laboratory
Dragon Buster	1987		✗	✓	✓	✓	Namco	Namco
Dragon City X-Rated	1991	Visual novel	✗	✓	✓	✓	Fairytale	Fairytale
Dragon Eyes - The Space Opera (aka ドラゴンアイズ)	1991	Graphic adventure/Eroge	✗	✓	✓	✓	Technopolis Soft	Technopolis Soft
Dragon King (aka 牙龍王)	1987	Vertical shooter	✗	✓	✓	✓	Sein Soft/Zainsoft	Sein Soft/Zainsoft
Dragon Knight (aka ドラゴンナイト)	1989	Dungeon Crawler/Eroge	✗	✓	✓	✓	Elf Co.	Elf Co.
Dragon Knight II (aka ドラゴンナイトII)	1991	Dungeon Crawler/Eroge	✗	✓	✓	✓	Elf Co.	Elf Co.
Dragon Quest (aka ドラゴンクエスト)	1986	RPG	✓	✓	✓	✓	Enix	Enix
Dragon Quest (MSX2) (aka ドラゴンクエスト)	1986	RPG	✗	✓	✓	✓	Enix	Enix
Dragon Quest II (aka ドラゴンクエストII)	1988	RPG	✓	✓	✓	✓	Enix	Enix
Dragon Quest II (MSX2) (aka ドラゴンクエストII)	1988	RPG	✗	✓	✓	✓	Enix	Enix
Dragon Quiz	1991	Quiz game/RPG	✓	✓	✓	✓	Compile	Compile
Dragon Slayer	1985	Action-RPG	✓	✓	✓	✓	Falcom	Square
Dragon Slayer II: Xanadu (aka Xanadu)	1987	Platform-adventure/Maze/RPG	✓	✓	✓	✓	Falcom	Falcom
Dragon Slayer II: Xanadu (MSX2) (aka Xanadu)	1987	Platform-adventure/Maze/RPG	✗	✓	✓	✓	Falcom	Falcom
Dragon Slayer IV: Drasle Family (aka Legacy of the Wizard)	1987	Platform-adventure/Maze	✓	✓	✓	✓	Falcom	Falcom
Dragon Slayer IV: Drasle Family (MSX2) (aka Legacy of the Wizard)	1988	Platform-adventure/Maze	✗	✓	✓	✓	Falcom	Falcom
Dragon Slayer VI: The Legend of Heroes	1990		✗	✓	✓	✓	Falcom	Falcom
Dragon Slayer Jr. (aka Romancia)	1986	Action-RPG	✓	✓	✓	✓	Falcom	Falcom
Dragon Slayer Jr. (MSX2) (aka Romancia)	1986	Action-RPG	✗	✓	✓	✓	Falcom	Falcom
Dragon World	1986	Interactive fiction	✓	✓	✓	✓	Telarium Corp.	Idealogic
DragonNinja (aka Bad Dudes vs. DragonNinja)	1988	Beat 'em up	✓	✓	✓	✓	Imagine Software	Ocean Software
Drainer (aka ドレイナー)	1987	Maze	✓	✓	✓	✓	Fun Project	Victor Musical Industries
Drakkar	1989	Action game	✓	✓	✓	✓	Diabolic	Delta Software
Drazen Petrovic Basket	1989	Sports - Basketball	✓	✓	✓	✓	Topo Soft	Erbe Software
Drácula	1986	Adventure game / Action-adventure	✓	✓	✓	✓	Genesis Soft / A.G.D.	P.P.P. Ediciones / Iber Soft
Driller Tanks (aka イタサンドリアス)	1984	Maze	✓	✓	✓	✓	Hudson Soft	Honeybee Soft / Kuma Computers
Dress of Murder 2	1990	Visual novel / Adult	✗	✓	✓	✓	Fairytale	Fairytale
Drome	1987	Action/Fixed shooter/Vehicular combat - Bike	✓	✓	✓	✓	Steve Course / The Bytebusters	Aackosoft
Druid (aka ドルイド)	1987	Action-adventure/Maze	✗	✓	✓	✓	Firebird	Nippon Dexter
Duck Out	1989	Action game	✓	✓	✓	✓	Xortrapa Soft	Dro Soft
Dungeon Adventure (aka Jewels of Darkness III: Dungeon Adventure)	1984	Interactive fiction	✓	✓	✓	✓	Level 9 Computing	Level 9 Computing
Dungeon Hunter (aka ダンジョンハンター)	1989	Shooter - Light-gun/Maze	✓	✓	✓	✓	ASCII Corporation	ASCII Corporation
Dungeon Master	1986	RPG	✓	✓	✓	✓	Eiichi Saida	ASCII Corporation
Dunk Shot (aka ダンクショット)	1986	Sports - Basketball	✓	✓	✓	✓	HAL Laboratory	HAL Laboratory
Dustin	1987		✓	✓	✓	✓	Dinamic	Dinamic
Dynamite Bowl	1987	Sports - Bowling	✓	✓	✓	✓	Softvision	Toshiba-EMI
Dynamite Dan	1986	Platform-adventure	✓	✓	✓	✓	Mirrorsoft	Mirrorsoft
Eagle	1987	Horizontal shooter	✓	✓	✓	✓	Juliet Software	Dro Soft
Eagle Fighter (aka イーグルファイター)	1985	Vehicular combat - Aircraft	✓	✓	✓	✓	Casio	Casio
The Earth Fighter Rayieza	1985		✓	✓	✓	✓		Enix
Earthling Crisis (aka 지구인의 위기일발)	1986	Adventure game	✓	✓	✓	✓	Soft Studio WING	Topia
Eat It!	1986	Action game	✓	✓	✓	✓	Aackosoft	Aackosoft
Échec	1985	Board game	✓	✓	✓	✓	Loriciels	Loriciels
Ecrin: The Secret Casket	1990	Block breaker	✗	✓	✓	✓	Studio Angel	All Circulation
Eddie Kidd Jump Challenge	1985	Sports - BMX	✓	✓	✓	✓	Martech Games	Martech Games / Aackosoft
Eggerland Mystery	1985	Puzzle - Action puzzle	✓	✓	✓	✓	F. Nakamura/I. Okuyama	HAL Laboratory
Eggerland Mystery 2	1986	Puzzle - Action puzzle	✓	✓	✓	✓	HAL Laboratory	HAL Laboratory
Eggy (aka エギー)	1985	Side-scroller/Action	✓	✓	✓	✓	Bothtec	Bothtec
E.I. - Exa Innova	1983	Vertical shooter	✓	✓	✓	✓	Programmers-3	Sony
The Eidolon	1986	Adventure	✓	✓	✓	✓	Activision/Lucasfilm Games	Pony Canyon
Eindeloos	1986	Unknown	✗	✓	✓	✓	Radarsoft / J. Vanderaart	Philips
El Amo del Mundo	?	Unknown	✓	✓	✓	✓	Positive	Positive
El Bingo	1985	Board game / Gambling video game	✓	✓	✓	✓	Indescomp	Sony Spain
El Caldero Mágico	?	Unknown	✓	✓	✓	✓	Grupo de Trabajo Software (G.T.S.)	Grupo de Trabajo Software (G.T.S.)
El Capitan Trueno	1988	Action-adventure	✓	✓	✓	✓	Dinamic	Dinamic
El Castillo de Godless	1985	Interactive fiction	✓	✓	✓	✓	Antonio Javier	Idealogic
El Cid	1987	Hack and slash	✓	✓	✓	✓	Dro Soft	Dro Soft
El Descubrimiento de America (aka ¡Tierra..!)	1986	Graphic adventure	✓	✓	✓	✓	OMK Software	OMK Software
El Gerente	1984	Simulation game	✓	✓	✓	✓	DIMensionNEW	DIMensionNEW
El Kiriki / Luna 3 / El Ahorcado	1985	Puzzle game	✓	✓	✓	✓	Monser	Monser
El Mago Volador 1 – Identificación de Números	1986	Educational game	✓	✓	✓	✓	Anaya Multimedia	Sony Spain
El Mago Volador 2 – Números y Cantidades	1986	Educational game	✓	✓	✓	✓	Anaya Multimedia	Sony Spain
El Motorista Sideral 1 – Formación de Conjuntos	1986	Educational game	✓	✓	✓	✓	Anaya Multimedia	Sony Spain
El Motorista Sideral 2 – Memoria Perceptiva	1986	Educational game	✓	✓	✓	✓	Anaya Multimedia	Sony Spain
El Mundo Perdido	1988	Action game	✓	✓	✓	✓	Topo Soft	Erbe Software
El Payaso Explorador 1 – Identificación de Objetos	1986	Educational game	✓	✓	✓	✓	Anaya Multimedia	Sony Spain
El Pescador Espacial 2 – Alto Largo / Bajo Corto	1986	Educational game	✓	✓	✓	✓	Anaya Multimedia	Sony Spain
El Pescador Espacial 1 – Grande / Mediano / Pequeño	1986	Educational game	✓	✓	✓	✓	Anaya Multimedia	Sony Spain
El Pescador Espacial 2 – Alto Largo / Bajo Corto	1986	Educational game	✓	✓	✓	✓	Anaya Multimedia	Sony Spain
El Pinguino	1986	Action game	✓	✓	✓	✓	Grupo de Trabajo Software (G.T.S.)	Grupo de Trabajo Software (G.T.S.)
El Poder Oscuro	1988	Run and gun	✓	✓	✓	✓	Arcadia Software	Arcadia Software
El Príncipe y el Dragón	1985	Edutainment	✓	✓	✓	✓	Spectravideo (SVI)	Advance
El Saltarín	1986	Action game	✓	✓	✓	✓	Grupo de Trabajo Software (G.T.S.)	Grupo de Trabajo Software (G.T.S.)
El Mundo Perdido	1988	Action game	✓	✓	✓	✓	Topo Soft	Erbe Software
El Tragamanzanas	?	Action game	✓	✓	✓	✓	Monser	Monser
Elevator Action (aka エレベーターアクション)	1985	Action-platformer	✓	✓	✓	✓	Taito	Nidecom
Elidon	1985	Action-adventure/Maze	✓	✓	✓	✓	Orpheus	Orpheus
Elite	1987	Space flight simulator	✓	✓	✓	✓	Mr. Micro	Firebird
Elthlead (aka エルスリード)	1988		✗	✓	✓	✓	NCS	NCS
Emerald Dragon	1990	JRPG	✗	✓	✓	✓	Glodia	Glodia
Emerald Isle	1985	Interactive fiction	✓	✓	✓	✓	Level 9 Computing	Level 9 Computing
Emilio Butragueno Futbol	1988	Sports - Boxing	✓	✓	✓	✓	Ocean Software	Erbe Software
Emilio Butragueno Futbol II	1989	Simulator - Training	✓	✓	✓	✓	Ocean Software	Erbe Software
Emilio Sánchez Vicario Grand Slam	1989	Sports - Tennis	✓	✓	✓	✓	Zigurat	Zigurat
The Emperor's Women	1988	Adventure	✗	✓	✓	✓	Omega system	Omega system
En Busca del Arca de la Alianza	1985	Action game	✓	✓	✓	✓	Creativos Editoriales	Sygran, S.A.
Enchanted	1989	Pinball	✓	✓	✓	✓		Positive
End of the Century Legend of Seeding: Game of Girl – Die for the Love!	1989	Visual Novel	✗	✓	✓	✓	Omega System	Great
Enigma	1987	Vertical shooter/Maze	✓	✓	✓	✓	ODIN Software	ODIN Software
Entführer ‒ Fairy Kidnapping	1989	Visual novel / Adult	✗	✓	✓	✓	Lucifer Soft	All Circulation
Erika: SF Adult Adventure (aka SFアダルトアドベンチャーエリカ)	1987	Visual novel	✓	✓	✓	✓	JAST	JAST
Escalador	1985	Platformer	✓	✓	✓	✓	EMSA	Sygran, S.A.
Escape (aka 大脱走)	1984	Action game	✓	✓	✓	✓	Ample Software	Mitsubishi Electric Corporation
The Escape	1985	Maze game	✓	✓	✓	✓	Visiogame	Visiogame
Esh's Aurunmilla	1985	Adventure game	✓	✓	✓	✓	LaserDisc Corporation	LaserDisc Corporation
European Games	1987	Sports	✓	✓	✓	✓	Tynesoft	Tynesoft
Every Day is Ecchi	1991	Visual novel	✗	✓	✓	✓	Heart Soft	Heart Soft
Evil Stone	1989	Visual novel	✗	✓	✓	✓	Studio ANGEL	All Circulation
Exchanger (aka エクスチェンジャー)	1983	Action - Timing	✓	✓	✓	✓	T.I	ASCII Corporation
Exciting Baseball	1984	Sports game	✓	✓	✓	✓	Casio	Casio
Exciting Jockey (aka 大障害競馬)	1984	Sports - Horse racing	✓	✓	✓	✓	Casio	Casio
Exciting Pack	1985	Compilation	✓	✓	✓	✓	Soft-Pro International	Soft-Pro International
Exerion (aka エクセリオン)	1984	Horizontal shooter	✓	✓	✓	✓	Jaleco	Dempa Micomsoft
Exerion II: Zorni (aka ゾルニ)	1984	Horizontal shooter	✓	✓	✓	✓	Jaleco	Sharp-Epcom/Eaglesoft
Exoide-Z (aka エクゾイドZ)	1986		✓	✓	✓	✓	Casio	Casio
Exoide-Z Area 5 (aka エクゾイドZエリア5)	1986	Vertical shooter	✓	✓	✓	✓	Casio	Casio
Exterlien (aka エクスタリアン)	1990	Eroge	✗	✓	✓	✓	D.O. Corp.	D.O. Corp.
Exterminator	1987	Multidirectional shooter	✗	✓	✓	✓	The Bytebusters	Eaglesoft
Eye	1987	Board game	✓	✓	✓	✓	Endurance Games	Endurance Games
F-1 Spirit 3D	1988		✗	✗	✓	✓	Konami	Panasoft
F-1 Spirit: The Way to Formula 1 (aka A1 Spirit, F-1・スピリット)	1987	Racing - Formula/Vertical scroller	✓	✓	✓	✓	Konami	Panasoft
F-15 Strike Eagle	1987	Vehicular combat - Aircraft	✓	✓	✓	✓	Microprose	Microprose
F-15 Strike Eagle (MSX2)	1988	Vehicular combat - Aircraft	✓	✓	✓	✓	Microprose	System Soft
F-16 / VG-Estrella	1985	Variety	✓	✓	✓	✓	Monser	Monser
F-16 Fighting Falcon (aka F16ファイティングファルコン)	1984	Flight simulator	✓	✓	✓	✓	Nexa Corporation	ASCII Corporation
F1 Travel Journal	1990	Racing - Formula	✗	✓	✓	✓	Namco	Namco
Fahrenheit 451	1986	Interactive fiction	✗	✓	✓	✓	Idealogic	Philips Spain
Fairy	1985	Action	✓	✓	✓	✓	ZAP	ZAP
The Fairyland Story (aka フェアリーランドストーリー)	1987	Single-screen platformer	✓	✓	✓	✓	GA-Yume	HOT - B
Fairytale	1992	Adventure game	✗	✓	✓	✓	Fairytale	Fairytale
Fall Out	1984	Shooter game	✓	✓	✓	✓	Policy	Policy
Fallen Angel Kyouko Part 1	1988	Visual novel	✗	✓	✓	✓	System House Oh!	System House Oh!
Famicle Parodic	1988	Vertical shooter	✗	✓	✓	✓	Bit^{2}	Bit^{2}
Famicle Parodic 2 (aka ファミクルパロディック2)	1990		✗	✓	✓	✓	Bit^{2}	Bit^{2}
Family Stadium Professional Baseball (aka プロ野球ファミリースタジアム)	1989	Sports - Baseball	✗	✓	✓	✓	Compile	Compile
Family Stadium Professional Baseball Homerun Contest	1989		✗	✓	✓	✓	Compile	Compile
Family Billiards	1987	Cue sports	✗	✓	✓	✓	Zemina	Pack-In-Video
Family Boxing (aka ファミリーボクシング)	1988	Sports - Boxing	✗	✓	✓	✓	Wood Place	Sony
Fantasm Soldier Valis	1986	Action-platformer	✓	✓	✓	✓	Telenet Japan	Telenet Japan
Fantasm Soldier Valis II	1989		✗	✓	✓	✓		Telenet Japan
Fanky Punky	1987	Platform-adventure	✓	✓	✓	✓	PJ. Software	Genesis Soft
Fantasy Zone (aka ファンタジーゾーン)	1986	Horizontal shooter - Cute 'em up	✗	✓	✓	✓	SEGA	Pony Canyon
Fantasy Zone 2: The Tears Of Opa Opa (aka ファンタジーゾーンII)	1987	Horizontal shooter - Cute 'em up	✗	✓	✓	✓	SEGA	Pony Canyon
Fathom	1985	Action game	✓	✓	✓	✓	Imagic	Toshiba-EMI Ltd.
Feedback	1988	Horizontal shooter	✗	✓	✓	✓		TechnoSoft
Feelin' Pastel Touch!!: Dangerous School Story	1990	Visual Novel	✗	✓	✓	✓	Artist Soft	Great
Fernando Martin Basket Master	1986	Sports - Basketball	✓	✓	✓	✓	Dinamic	Dinamic
Fernando Martin Basket Master: Executive Version	1987	Sports - Basketball	✓	✓	✓	✓	Dinamic	Dinamic
Feud (aka Halloween)	1987	Action-Adventure/Maze	✓	✓	✓	✓	Binary Design	Mastertronic
Fharanx	1985	RPG	✓	✓	✓	✓	Enix	Enix
Field Master	1985	Vehicular combat - Tank	✓	✓	✓	✓	Login Soft	ASCII Corporation
Fight! Great War in the Land of Taste	1984	Action game	✓	✓	✓	✓	Pony Canyon·Space Ram	Pony Canyon·Space Ram
Fighting Rider	1985	Action game	✓	✓	✓	✓	Nippon Columbia	Colpax
The Fighting Sailor Fuku-Ferisu	1990	Action game	✗	✓	✓	✓	Cocktail Soft	Cocktail Soft
The Fighting Wolf AT (aka 単騎狼・ウルフ・AT)	1990	Beat-'em-up	✗	✓	✓	✓	Tokuma Shoten Intermedia/Plato	Technopolis Soft
Final Countdown	1988	Vehicular combat - Aircraft	✓	✓	✓	✓	Eurosoft	Methodic Solutions
Final Countdown (MSX2)	1988	Vehicular combat - Aircraft	✗	✓	✓	✓	Eurosoft	Methodic Solutions
Final Fantasy	1989		✗	✓	✓	✓	Square	Square
Final Justice	1985	Vertical shooter	✓	✓	✓	✓	Compile	Pony
Final Mahjong (aka ファイナル麻雀)	1983	Board game - Mahjong	✗	✓	✓	✓	MIA	MIA
Final Zone Wolf (aka ファイナルゾーンウルフ)	1986	Vertical shooter	✓	✓	✓	✓	Telenet Japan	Telenet Japan
Finders Keepers	1985	Platform-adventure	✓	✓	✓	✓	David Jones	Mastertronic
Fire Ball	1988	Pinball	✗	✓	✓	✓	Humming Bird Soft	Humming Bird Soft
Fire Rescue (aka ファイヤーレスキュー)	1984	Platformer	✓	✓	✓	✓	Hudson Soft	Hudson Soft
Fire Star	1988	Vertical shooter	✓	✓	✓	✓	OMK Software	OMK Software
Fireball	1983	Action game	✓	✓	✓	✓	Hudson Soft	Hudson Soft
Firehawk	1987	Action game	✓	✓	✓	✓	Players	Players
Firehawk: Thexder the Second Contact	1989		✗	✓	✓	✓	Game Arts	Game Arts
First Steps with the Mr. Men	1985	Educational	✓	✓	✓	✓	Primer Educational Software	Mirrorsoft
Fisherman Sanpei – Fishing Hermit	1989	Fishing	✗	✓	✓	✓	Cross Media Soft	Victor Co. of Japan (JVC)
Fisherman Sanpei Blue Marlin Episode	1988	Fishing	✗	✓	✓	✓	Cross Media Soft	Victor Interactive Software
Five Gals Connection	1988	Puzzle	✗	✓	✓	✓	I-Cell	I-Cell
Five Holy Girls	1987	Adventure game	✗	✓	✓	✓	SST	Cosmos Computer
Flappy	1984	Puzzle	✓	✓	✓	✓	dB-SOFT	dB-SOFT
Flappy Limited '85 (aka フラッピーリミテッド)	1985	Puzzle	✓	✓	✓	✓	dB-SOFT	dB-SOFT|-
Flash Gordon	1987	Run and gun/Maze	✓	✓	✓	✓	Mastertronic	Mastertronic
Flash Splash	1984	Vertical shooter	✓	✓	✓	✓	Isoco	Toshiba-EMI
Fleet Commander 2	1990	Simulation game	✗	✓	✓	✓	ASCII Corporation	ASCII Corporation
Flicky	1986	Platformer	✓	✓	✓	✓	Sega	Micronet
Flight Deck	1986	Vehicle simulation - Aircraft carrier	✓	✓	✓	✓	D. Aron	Aackosoft
Flight Deck II	1986	Vehicle simulation - Aircraft carrier	✓	✓	✓	✓	D. Aron	Aackosoft
Flight Path 737	1984	Flight Simulator	✓	✓	✓	✓	Anirog	Anirog
Flight Simulator with Torpedo Attack (aka フライトシミュレーター)	1988	Flight Simulator	✓	✓	✓	✓	Sublogic	Sublogic
The Flintstones	1988	Obstacle avoiding	✓	✓	✓	✓	Teque Software Development	Grandslam Entertainments
Flipper Slipper	1984	Block breaker	✓	✓	✓	✓	Spectravideo	Spectravideo
Flop Chop	1985	Action game	✓	✓	✓	✓	Iveson Software	Sony Spain
Flower Card	1984	Board game - Mahjong	✓	✓	✓	✓	Central Education	Central Education
Flower Cards Koi-Koi	1984	Card video game	✓	✓	✓	✓	RAM Soft	ASCII Corporation
Follow the Clues	1986	Adventure game	✓	✓	✓	✓	Grupo de Trabajo Software (G.T.S.)	Grupo de Trabajo Software (G.T.S.)
Football Manager	1983	Simulator - Manager/Sports - Soccer	✓	✓	✓	✓	Addictive Games	Endurance Games
Football Manager World Cup Edition	1990	Simulator - Manager/Sports - Soccer	✓	✓	✓	✓	Bedrock Software	Addictive Games
Footballer of the Year	1986	Simulator - Career/Sports - Soccer	✓	✓	✓	✓	Gremlin Graphics	Gremlin Graphics
Foot Volley	1986	Sports - Foot volleyball	✓	✓	✓	✓	Players	Players
For MSX Special	1985	Variety	✓	✓	✓	✓	Tokuma Shoten Intermedia	Tokuma Shoten Intermedia
For MSX Special '86	1987	Variety	✓	✓	✓	✓	Tokuma Shoten Intermedia	Technopolis Soft
For MSX Special 2	—	Variety	✓	✓	✓	✓	Tokuma Shoten Intermedia	Technopolis Soft
For The Day II (aka 그날이 오면 2)	1985	Horizontal shooter	✗	✓	✓	✓	Minnae Soft Co.	Minnae Soft Co.
Forajidos	1986	Fixed shooter	✓	✓	✓	✓	Edisoft	Sygran, S.A.
The forbidden city (aka 紫禁城)	1989	Puzzle	✗	✓	✓	✓	Scaptrust	Scaptrust
Forbidden Fruit	1986	Maze	✓	✓	✓	✓	Krypton Force	Mind Games España
Forbidden Paradise	1989	Visual Novel	✗	✓	✓	✓	Studio ANGEL	All Circulation
Formation Z (aka フォーメーションZ)	1985	Run and gun	✓	✓	✓	✓	Jaleco	Nippon Dexter
Formula 1 Simulator	1985	Racing - Formula	✓	✓	✓	✓	Mastertronic	Mastertronic
Four battle Mah-jong	1984	Board game	✓	✓	✓	✓	MIA	Sony
Four excitement mah-jong	1984	Board game	✓	✓	✓	✓	Tecno Soft	Tecno Soft
Four Wall Smash	1984	Action game	✓	✓	✓	✓	Ronex Computer AB	Spectravideo (SVI)
Foxy	1990	Strategy	✗	✓	✓	✓	Elf Co.	Elf Co.
Fraction Fever	1985	Educational game	✓	✓	✓	✓	Spinnaker Software Corporation	Sony Spain
Frankie	1988	Action game	✓	✓	✓	✓	SPE	System 4
Fray in Magical Adventure	1990		✗	✓	✓	✓		Micro Cabin
Freddy Hardest	1987	Jump and run	✓	✓	✓	✓	Dinamic	Dinamic
Freddy Hardest in South Manhattan	1989	Beat 'em up	✓	✓	✓	✓	Dinamic	Dinamic
Frog (Advance)	1985	Action - Frogger	✓	✓	✓	✓	Ace Software S.A.	Advance
Frog (Premium III Software Distribution)	1988	Action - Frogger	✓	✓	✓	✓	Eurosoft	Premium III Software Distributiont
Frogger (aka フロッガー)	1983	Action - Frogger	✓	✓	✓	✓	Konami	Konami
Froggy	1985	Action game	✓	✓	✓	✓	Visiogame	Visiogame
Front Line	1984	Vertical shooter	✓	✓	✓	✓	Taito	Taito
Fruit Machine	1985		✓	✓	✓	✓	DK'tronics	DK'tronics
Fruit Panic (aka フルーツパニック)	1984	Single-screen platformer	✓	✓	✓	✓	Pony Canyon	Pony Canyon
Fruit Search (aka フルーツサーチ)	1983	Puzzle - Bulls and Cows	✓	✓	✓	✓	Takara	Takara
Fruity Frank	1985	Action - Digging	✓	✓	✓	✓	Stephen Wallis	Kuma Computers
Funky Mouse	1984	Action-platformer	✓	✓	✓	✓	ZAP	ASCII Corporation
Funny Eight	1988	Action	✓	✓	✓	✓	Odin Software	Odin Software
Futbol	1985	Sports - Soccer	✓	✓	✓	✓	Indescomp	Philips Spain
Future Knight	1986	Action-platformer	✓	✓	✓	✓	Gremlin Graphics	Gremlin Graphics
Fuzzball	1986	Isometric platformer/Puzzle	✓	✓	✓	✓	The Bytebusters	Eaglesoft
FX-15 Combat	1987	Action	✓	✓	✓	✓	Mind Games España	Mind Games España
G.P. Formula 1 Simulator	1991	Racing - Formula	✓	✓	✓	✓	Diabolic	Zigurat
G.P. World	1985	Racing - Formula	✓	✓	✓	✓	Sega	Sega
Gagnant	1986	Action game	✓	✓	✓	✓	Humming Bird Soft	Humming Bird Soft
Gaia	1986	Action game	✓	✓	✓	✓	Samson Software	Samson Software
Gaia's Crest	1988	Simulation video game	✗	✓	✓	✓	NCS	NCS
Gakuen Monogatari - High School Story (aka 学園物語)	1988	Adventure	✗	✓	✓	✓	Great Software	Great Software
Gal Hunt Big Operation!!	1988	Dating Simulation	✗	✓	✓	✓	Family Soft	Family Soft
Galactic Mercenaries	1985		✓	✓	✓	✓	AA Software	Infogrames
Galaga	1984	Fixed shooter - Galaxian	✓	✓	✓	✓	Namco	Namco
Galaxian	1984	Fixed shooter - Galaxian	✓	✓	✓	✓	Namco	Bug-Byte Software
Galaxy Drift Motorcycle Femme (aka 銀河漂流バイファム) (aka Galactic Drifter Vifam)	1984	Vehicular Combat - Mech	✓	✓	✓	✓	BANDAI	BANDAI
Galaxy Hero Legend	1989	Vehicular Combat - Mech	✗	✓	✓	✓	Bothtec	Bothtec
Galaxy Hero Legend II	1991	Simulation	✗	✓	✓	✓	Bothtec	Bothtec
Galaxy Soldier Daimos	1985	Action game	✓	✓	✓	✓	Soft Studio WING	Soft Studio WING
Galaxy Traveler	1983	Vehicular Combat - Mech	✓	✓	✓	✓	Nihon Maikon Gakuin	Nihon Maikon Gakuin
Galaxy: Card & Puzzle Collection GINGA	1989	Puzzle video game	✗	✓	✓	✓	System Soft	System Soft
Galf Streem	1989	Action game	✗	✓	✓	✓	Sein Soft / XAIN Soft / Zainsoft	Sein Soft / XAIN Soft / Zainsoft
Gall Force: Defense of Chaos (aka ガルフォース)	1986	Vertical shooter	✓	✓	✓	✓	HAL Laboratory	Sony
Gall Force: Eternal Story	1987		✗	✓	✓	✓	HAL Laboratory	HAL Laboratory
Gambler Jiko Chuushinha	1988	Board game	✗	✓	✓	✓	Yellow Horn Game Arts	Game Arts
Gambler Jiko Chuushinha 2 : Professed Powerful Majhong Players Edition	1989	Board game	✗	✓	✓	✓	Yellow Horn Game Arts	Game Arts
Game Box (aka صندوق الألعاب)	1987	Variety	✓	✓	✓	✓	Barq	Barq
Game Compilation 1	1987	Compilation	✓	✓	✓	✓	Philips Italy	Philips Italy
Game Land Special	1984	Compilation	✓	✓	✓	✓	Casio	Casio
Game of Mini Go	1988	Board game	✗	✓	✓	✓	Mighty Micom System	Mighty Micom System
Game Over	1988	Action-platformer	✓	✓	✓	✓	P. Sudon	Dinamic
Game Over II (aka Phantis)	1987	Horizontal shooter	✓	✓	✓	✓	Dinamic	Dinamic
Game Pack II	1986	Variety	✓	✓	✓	✓	Aackosoft	Aackosoft
The Games: Winter Edition	1988	Sports - Winter Olympics	✓	✓	✓	✓	Epyx	Sentient Software Ltd.
Ganbare Goemon (aka がんばれゴエモン！からくり道中)	1987	Action-adventure	✗	✓	✓	✓	Konami	Konami
Gandhara: Buddha no Seisen	1988	Action RPG	✗	✓	✓	✓	Enix	Enix
Gang Man (aka ギャングマン)	1984	Action	✗	✓	✓	✓	Hudson Soft	Honeybee Soft/Sony
Gang Master (aka ギャング・マスター)	1983	Puzzle	✓	✓	✓	✓	S. Shigematsu	ASCII Corporation
Gary Lineker's Super Star soccer	1987	Simulator - Manager/Sports - Soccer	✓	✓	✓	✓	Gremlin Graphics	Gremlin Graphics
Gate of Labyrinth	1987	Rpg	✓	✓	✓	✓	Dempa Micomsoft	Dempa Micomsoft
Gaudi - The Wind of Barcelona (aka ガウディバルセロナの風)	1989	Adventure	✗	✓	✓	✓	Wolfteam	Wolfteam
Gauntlet	1985	Action/Maze	✓	✓	✓	✓	Gremlin Graphics	U.S. Gold
GEAR	—	Action game	✓	✓	✓	✓	Shiseido	Shiseido
Geld	1986	Educational game	✓	✓	✓	✓	Aschcom	Aschcom
Gemini Wing	1989	Vertical shooter	✓	✓	✓	✓	Tecmo	Dro Soft
Genghis Khan	1991	Strategy	✓	✓	✓	✓	Positive Software	Positive Software
Genghis Khan - The Blue Wolf and The White Doe (aka 蒼き狼と白き牝鹿)	1986	Simulation	✓	✓	✓	✓	KOEI	KOEI
Genghis Khan 2 - The Blue Wolf and The White Stag (aka 蒼き狼と白き牝鹿・ジンギスカン)	1988	Strategy	✓	✓	✓	✓	KOEI	KOEI
Genghis Khan 2 - The Blue Wolf and The White Stag (MSX2) (aka 蒼き狼と白き牝鹿・ジンギスカン)	1988	Strategy	✗	✓	✓	✓	KOEI	KOEI
Genghis Khan 3 - The Blue Wolf and The White Doe - Yuan Dynasty Secret History (aka 蒼き狼と白き牝鹿・元朝秘史)	1992	Simulation	✗	✓	✓	✓	KOEI	KOEI
Genograms	1986	Quiz game	✓	✓	✓	✓	Microteknix	Microteknix
Geometrías	1986	Action	✓	✓	✓	✓	Mind Games España	Mind Games España
Ghost	1989	Action game	✓	✓	✓	✓	Mind Games España	Mind Games España
Ghost Time	1989	Platformer	✓	✓	✓	✓	M&E Soft	Premium III Software Distribution
Ghostbusters	1984	Action	✓	✓	✓	✓	Activision	Activision
Ghostbusters II	1989	Action - Timing	✓	✓	✓	✓	Activision	MCM Software
Girls Control	1989	Shoot-'em-up - Vertical, Adult	✗	✓	✓	✓	HARD	HARD
Girls Library	1992	Visual novel	✗	✓	✓	✓	Fairytale; Cocktail Soft	Santa Fe
Girls Paradise - Paradise Angels	1989	Adventure game	✗	✓	✓	✓	Great	Great
Girly Block (aka ガーリーブロック)	1987	Fighting - Robots	✗	✓	✓	✓	Telenet Japan	Telenet Japan
Gitahei	1986		✓	✓	✓	✓	Micro Cabin	Micro Cabin
Gize! XIX	1992	RPG	✗	✓	✓	✓	Fairytale	Fairytale
Glass	1985		✓	✓	✓	✓	Quicksilva	Channel 8 Software
Glider (aka グライダー)	1985	Vehicle simulation - Glider	✓	✓	✓	✓	ZAP	ZAP
Globi Blod	1986		✓	✓	✓	✓	Proeco	Iveson Software
Glorious Force (aka グロリアスフォース)	1987	RPG	✓	✓	✓	✓	Aquarius	Aquarius
Gnome Ranger	1987	Interactive fiction	✓	✓	✓	✓	Level 9 Computing	Level 9 Computing
Goblin (aka 魔性の館ガバリン)	1987	Action/Maze	✓	✓	✓	✓	Pony Canyon	Pony Canyon
Goddesses Mansion (aka 女神たちの館)	1987	Visual novel, Adult	✗	✓	✓	✓	BAM	DOTT Plan
Godzilla-kun (aka ゴジラくん, aka Godzilland)	1985	Action/Maze	✓	✓	✓	✓	Compile	Toho
The Godzilla VS 3 Major Monsters (aka ゴジラVS3大怪獣)	1984	Shooter	✓	✓	✓	✓	BANDAI	BANDAI
The Golf	1988		✗	✓	✓	✓	Pack-In-Video	Pack-In-Video
Gokudo Jintori (aka極道陣取り)	1988	Strategy	✗	✓	✓	✓	Micronet Co., Ltd.	Micronet Co., Ltd.
Golden Basket	1990	Sports - Basketball	✓	✓	✓	✓	Opera Soft	Opera Soft
Golden Grave (aka 黄金の墓)	1984	Adventure, Text only	✓	✓	✓	✓	Stratford Computer Center Corporation	MagicalZoo
Golden Grave II - Mystery of Sphinx (aka 続黄金の墓)	1985	Adventure, Text only	✓	✓	✓	✓	Stratford Computer Center Corporation	MagicalZoo
Golden Pack: Total 6 Volumes (aka ゴールデンパック全6巻)	1987	Puzzle, Adult	✗	✓	✓	✓	Gun Deck	Gun Deck
Golf Country (aka ゴルフカントリー)	1983	Sport games	✓	✓	✓	✓	Apollo Technica	Apollo Technica
Golf Game (aka ゴルフゲーム)	1983	Sport games	✓	✓	✓	✓	ASCII Corporation	ASCII Corporation
Golgo 13 - Wolf's Nest (aka ゴルゴ13狼の巣)	1984	Graphic adventure	✓	✓	✓	✓	Pony Canyon	Pony Canyon
Golvellius (aka Devil Golvellius, 魔王ゴルベリアス)	1987	Action-platformer	✓	✓	✓	✓	Compile	Compile
Golvellius 2 (aka Shin Maou Golvellius )	1988		✗	✗	✓	✓	Compile	Compile
Gonzzalezz	1989	Platformer	✓	✓	✓	✓	Opera Soft	Opera Soft
Good Places in Heaven (aka 天国よいとこ)	1987	Action-Adventure	✗	✓	✓	✓	TAITO	TAITO
Goody	1987	Platform-adventure	✓	✓	✓	✓	Opera Soft	Opera Soft
Goody (MSX2)	1988	Platform-adventure	✗	✓	✓	✓	Opera Soft	Opera Soft
The Goonies	1986	Single-screen platformer	✓	✓	✓	✓	Konami	Konami
Gorby no Pipeline Daisakusen	1991		✗	✓	✓	✓	Compile	Compile
Gomoku Narabe (aka 五目ならべ)	1984	Board game - Gomoku	✓	✓	✓	✓	Comtec	Toshiba-EMI
Gram Cats (aka グラムキャッツ)	1989	Adventure	✗	✓	✓	✓	DOTT Plan	DOTT Plan
Gram Cats 2 (aka グラムキャッツ2)	1993	Adventure	✗	✓	✓	✓	DOTT Plan	DOTT Plan
Great Naval Battle in the Sea of Japan (aka 日本海大海戦・海ゆかば)	1985	Shoot-'em-up	✓	✓	✓	✓	Laserdisc Corporation	Laserdisc Corporation
Greatest Driver	1988		✗	✓	✓	✓		T&E Soft
Green Beret (video game)	1986	Run and gun	✓	✓	✓	✓	Konami	Konami
Gremlins 2: The New Batch	1990	Action-platformer	✓	✓	✓	✓	Topo Soft	Topo Soft
Gruta de Maquiné	1989	Interactive fiction	✓	✓	✓	✓	Nemesis Informática	Nemesis Informática
Guillem de Berguedà	1985	Adventure, Text only	✓	✓	✓	✓	Centre Divulgador de la Informàtica	Centre Divulgador de la Informàtica
Guillermo Tell	1989	Arcade	✓	✓	✓	✓	Opera Soft	Opera Soft
Guardic	1986		✓	✓	✓	✓	Compile	Compile
Gulliver (akaガリバー)	1988	Adventure, Text and Gfx	✗	✓	✓	✓	C.B.C.	C.B.C.
Gulkave (aka ガルケーブ)	1986	Horizontal shooter	✓	✓	✓	✓	Compile	Pony
Gumshoe Logic	1985	Puzzle - Logic	✓	✓	✓	✓	MEgaCyCAL	MEgaCyCAL
Gun.Smoke	1989	Shoot-'em-up	✓	✓	✓	✓	Capcom	Prosoft
Gunfright	1985	Action-adventure	✓	✓	✓	✓	Ultimate Play the Game	Ultimate Play the Game (U.K.), Jaleco (Japan)
Gunman Submarine Shooter	1984	Shoot-'em-up (All)	✓	✓	✓	✓	Hudson Soft	Hudson Soft
Gunship	1988	Simulation	✗	✓	✓	✓	MicroProse	MicroProse
Gunstreet	1993	Shooter - Lightgun	✓	✓	✓	✓	Electromagic Software	Electromagic Software
Gusano	1985	Arcade	✓	✓	✓	✓	J. Sánchez Armas	Advance
Guss en la Atlantida	1985	Adventure, Text only	✓	✓	✓	✓	Creativos Editoriales	Sygran, S.A.
Guttblaster	1988	Action, Shoot-'em-up, Vertical	✓	✓	✓	✓	Eurosoft	Premium III Software Distribution
Gyro Adventure (aka ジャイロアドベンチャー)	1986	Vertical shooter	✓	✓	✓	✓	Taito	Taito
Gyrodine	1984	Vertical shooter	✓	✓	✓	✓	Nippon Columbia	Colpax/Microbyte
H.E.R.O.	1984	Maze/Obstacle avoiding	✓	✓	✓	✓	Activision	Activision
Habilit	1988	Maze/Puzzle	✓	✓	✓	✓	Iber Soft	MCM Software
Hacker (aka ハッカー)	1988	Puzzle	✗	✓	✓	✓	Pony Canyon	Pony Canyon
Hadou no Hyouteki - Legend of the Melvel (aka 波動の標的)	1988	Adventure	✗	✓	✓	✓	Soft Studio WING	Soft Studio WING
Hammer Boy	1991	Action	✓	✓	✓	✓	Dinamic	Dro Soft
Hai no Majutsushi	1989	Board game - Mahjong	✗	✓	✓	✓	Konami	Konami
Hammer-Head	1992	Arcade	✓	✓	✓	✓	Zigurat	Zigurat
Hanafuda (aka花札)	1985	Board games	✓	✓	✓	✓	Comtec	Toshiba-EMI Ltd.
Hanasangen (aka華三眩)	1989	Board game	✗	✓	✓	✓	Studio Offside	Studio Offside
Hanazono of a dragon (aka龍の花園)	1992	Rpg, Adult	✗	✓	✓	✓	Family Soft	Family Soft
Handbook of Iga's technique (aka伊賀忍法帖)	1985	Scrolling platformer	✓	✓	✓	✓	Casio	Casio
Handbook of Iga's Technique: The Fight of Full Moon Castle (aka Iga Ninpou Chou, 伊賀忍法帖満月城の戦い)	1986	Scrolling platformer	✓	✓	✓	✓	Casio	Casio
Hang-On (aka ハングオン)	1985	Racing - Motorcycle	✓	✓	✓	✓	SEGA	SEGA
Hankman	1986	Puzzle	✓	✓	✓	✓	Hank Dussen Programeursgroep	Hank Dussen Programeursgroep
Haphazard	1987	Action game	✗	✓	✓	✓	BAM	DOTT Plan
Haphazard 2 - Space Edition	1988	Action game	✗	✓	✓	✓	BAM	DOTT Plan
Happy Fret (aka ハッピーフレット)	1985	Platform-adventure	✗	✓	✓	✓	Group C	Arrow Soft
Harajuku After Dark (aka原宿After Dark)	1989	Adventure	✗	✓	✓	✓	Kogado Studio	Kogado Studio
Harapeko Pakkun (aka はらぺこパックン)	1984	Puzzle - Logic	✓	✓	✓	✓	Pax Softonica	ASCII Corporation
HARD Sha no Shachou ga Shain ni Omoshiroi to Mitomesaseta Quiz Dai 1 Dan, Kimi mo Narita e Itte Katte ni Janken o Shiyou (aka HARD社の社長が社員に面白いと認めさせたクイズ第一弾、君も成田へ行って勝手にジャンケンをしよう)	1988	Adult/Quiz	✗	✓	✓	✓	HARD	HARD
Hard Ball (aka ハードボール)	1987	Sports - Baseball	✗	✓	✓	✓	Accolade	Sony
Hard Boiled	1987	Maze/Platformer	✓	✓	✓	✓	Methodic Solutions	Methodic Solutions
HareRaiser Prelude	1990	Action game	✗	✓	✓	✓	Haresoft	Haresoft
Harry Fox MSX Special (aka は～りぃふぉっくす雪の魔王編)	1985	Interactive fiction	✓	✓	✓	✓	Microcabin	Microcabin
Harry Fox: The Demon King of Snow (akaハリー・フォックス ～雪の魔王～)	1987	RPG	✗	✓	✓	✓	MicroCabin	MicroCabin
Haunted House	1988	Platform	✓	✓	✓	✓	Eurosoft	Premium III Software Distribution
Head over Heels	1988	Isometric platformer	✓	✓	✓	✓	Ocean Software	Ocean Software
Heat Seeker	1986	Vertical Scroller/Obstacle avoiding	✓	✓	✓	✓	Ocean Software	Mind Games España
Heavy Boxing (aka ヘビーボクシング)	1983	Sports - Boxing	✓	✓	✓	✓	Takara	Takara
The Heist (aka ハイスト)	1985	Platformer	✓	✓	✓	✓	Livesay Computer Games	Livesay Computer Games
Heli-tank (aka ヘリタンク)	1984	Shooter	✓	✓	✓	✓	NABU	ASCII Corporation
Helicopter Panic (akaヘリコプターパニック)	1984	Shoot-'em-up	✓	✓	✓	✓	Marufune FSL	Marufune FSL
Hercule	1984		✓	✓	✓	✓	Infogrames	Infogrames
Hercules, Slayer of the Damned!	1988	Action	✓	✓	✓	✓	Gremlin Graphics	Gremlin Graphics
Here & There with the Mr. Men	1985	Action	✓	✓	✓	✓	PrImer Educational Software	Mirrorsoft
Heroes of the Lance (akaヒーロー・オブ・ランス)	1991	Rpg	✗	✓	✓	✓	US Gold	Pony Canyon
Herzog (akaヘルツォーク)	1988	Simulation	✗	✓	✓	✓	Tecno Soft	Tecno Soft
Hiatari Ryoko!: Hidamari-so no Nakama-tachi (aka陽あたり良好！ひだまり荘の仲間たち)	1988	Visual Novel	✗	✓	✓	✓	Toho	Toho
Hideger (akaハイデッガー)	1989	Simulation	✗	✓	✓	✓	Sein Soft / XAIN Soft / Zainsoft	Sein Soft / XAIN Soft / Zainsoft
Hideki Museum Vol. 3 – New Maze Club / Yume Pro Works Collection	1992	Puzzle	✗	✓	✓	✓	Syntax	Syntax
Higemaru Makaijima: Nanatsu no Shima Daibōken	1987		✗	✓	✓	✓	Capcom	Capcom
High School Idol Young Wife's Struggles (aka女子高生アイドル おさな妻奮戦記)	1988	Visual Novel, Adult	✓	✓	✓	✓	Studio ANGEL	All Circulation
High School! Kimengumi (aka ハイスクール！奇面組)	1987	Action-adventure	✗	✓	✓	✓	SEGA	Pony
High Way Star (aka ハイウェイスター)	1983	Maze	✓	✓	✓	✓	Way Limit Corporation	National
Highway Encounter	1985	Isometric shooter	✓	✓	✓	✓	Vortex Software	Vortex Software
Hi no Tori Hououhen (aka Firebird, 火の鳥鳳凰編)	1987	Vertical shooter/Maze	✗	✓	✓	✓	Kadokawa Shoten	Konami
The Hitchhiker's Guide to the Galaxy	1986	Interactive fiction	✓	✓	✓	✓	Infocom	Infocom
Hiper Tronic	1987	Arcade	✓	✓	✓	✓	Genesis Soft / A.G.D.	P.P.P. Ediciones
Hiroku Kubikiri Yakata (aka秘録 首斬り館)	1989	Adventure	✗	✓	✓	✓	Bit^{2}	Bit^{2}
The Hobbit	1985	Interactive fiction	✓	✓	✓	✓	Melbourne House	Melbourne House
Hokkaido Rensa Satsujin: Ohotsuku ni Kiyu (aka オホーツクに消ゆ)	1985	Adventure	✓	?	?	?	Loginsoft	ASCII Corporation
Hitomi Kobayashi - Puzzle in London (aka小林ひとみパズルインロンドン)	1988	Puzzle, Adult	✗	✓	✓	✓	Informercial	Informercial
Hiyoko Fighter (akaヒヨコファイター)	1984	Action, Platform	✓	✓	✓	✓	Hudson Soft	SoftBank
Holdfast	1984	Simulation, Strategy	✓	✓	✓	✓	K. J. Ollett	Kuma Computers
Hole in One	1984	Sports - Golf	✓	✓	✓	✓	F. Nakamura	HAL Laboratory
Hole in One Professional (akaホール・イン・ワンプロフェッショナル)	1985	Sport games	✓	✓	✓	✓	HAL Laboratory	HAL Laboratory
Hole in One Special	1987	Sports - Golf	✗	✓	✓	✓	Hal Laboratory	HAL Laboratory
Hollywood Hijinx	1986	Adventure	✓	✓	✓	✓	Infocom	Infocom
Holy city of God (aka神の聖都)	1989	Adventure	✗	✓	✓	✓	Panther Software	Panther Software
Home Computer ABC	1983	Variety	✓	✓	✓	✓	Sony	Sony
Hopper	1986	Action - Frogger	✓	✓	✓	✓	Aackosoft	Aackosoft
Hostages	1990	Strategy	✓	✓	✓	✓	Infogrames	Erbe Software
Hot Milk (akaほっとミルク)	1988	Adult	✗	✓	✓	✓	Fairytale	Fairytale
Hot Shoe	1984	Action	✓	✓	✓	✓	Longman	Eclipse
How Many Robot (akaハウ・メニ・ロボット)	1988	Simulation	✗	✓	✓	✓	Artdink Corporation	Artdink Corporation
Howard the Duck	1987	Action-adventure	✓	✓	✓	✓	Dan Michek and Troy Lyndon	Activision
Hudson 3D Golf (akaゴルフ狂)	1984	Sport games	✓	✓	✓	✓	Hudson Soft	SoftBank
Humphrey	1984	Action - Q*bert	✓	✓	✓	✓	Mr. Micro	Mr. Micro
Humphrey	1988	Puzzle - Action puzzle	✓	✓	✓	✓	Made in Spain	Zigurat
Hunchback	1985		✓	✓	✓	✓	Ocean Software	Ocean Software
Hundra	1988	Action-platformer	✓	✓	✓	✓	Zeus Soft	Dinamic
Hungry Harry	1987	Action - Timing	✓	✓	✓	✓	Grupo de Trabajo Software	Grupo de Trabajo Software
The Hunt for Red October	1987	Vehicle simulation - Submarine	✓	✓	✓	✓	Grandslam Entertainments	Grandslam Entertainments
Hunter Killer	1985	Adventure	✓	✓	✓	✓	AA Software	Kuma Computers
Hustle Chumy (aka ハッスルチュミー)	1984	Single-screen platformer	✓	✓	✓	✓	Nisso	Programmers-3
Hustler	1984	Cue sports	✓	✓	✓	✓	Dave Collins	Bubble Bus Software
Hydefos			✗	✓	✓	✓		Hertz
Hydlide	1985	Action-RPG	✓	✓	✓	✓	T&E Soft	T&E Soft
Hydlide (MSX2)	1985	Action-RPG	✗	✓	✓	✓	T&E Soft	T&E Soft
Hydlide II: Shine of Darkness (aka ハイドライドII)	1986	Action-RPG	✓	✓	✓	✓	T&E Soft	T&E Soft
Hydlide 3 (aka ハイドライド3)	1987	Action-RPG	✓	✓	✓	✓	T&E Soft	T&E Soft
Hydlide 3 (MSX2) (aka ハイドライド3)	1987	Action-RPG	✗	✓	✓	✓	T&E Soft	T&E Soft
Hype			✓	✓	✓	✓		Eaglesoft
Hyper Olympic (aka Track & Field)	1984	Sports - Decathlon	✓	✓	✓	✓	Konami	Konami
Hyper Olympic II (aka Track & Field II)	1984	Sports - Decathlon	✓	✓	✓	✓	Konami	Konami
Hyper Rally	1985	Racing	✓	✓	✓	✓	Konami	Konami
Hyper Sports (aka ハイパースポーツ1)	1984	Sports	✓	✓	✓	✓	Konami	Konami
Hyper Sports II (aka ハイパースポーツ2)	1984	Sports	✓	✓	✓	✓	Konami	Konami
Hyper Sports III (aka ハイパースポーツ3)	1985	Sports	✓	✓	✓	✓	Konami	Konami
Hyper Viper	1985		✓	✓	✓	✓	Stephen Wallis	Kuma Computers
Hyperball	1985	Sports - Fictional	✓	✓	✓	✓	Mind Games España	Mind Games España
Hypsys	1989	Vertical shooter	✓	✓	✓	✓	Techno Arts	Dro Soft
I like you the most in the world! (aka 世界で一番君がすき！)	1990	Visual Novel	✗	✓	✓	✓	Cocktail Soft	Cocktail Soft
I Only Love You... (akaキミだけに愛を...)	1991	Visual Novel	✗	✓	✓	✓	Technopolis Soft, Fairytale	Technopolis Soft
I Want to Approach Her (akaせまってみたい)	1989	Dating Simulation	✗	✓	✓	✓	HARD	Gun Deck
Ice	1986	Maze/Puzzle	✓	✓	✓	✓	The Bytebusters	Eaglesoft
Ice Breaker	1990	Arcade	✓	✓	✓	✓	Topo Soft	Erbe Software
The Ice King	1986	Adventure	✓	✓	✓	✓	CDS Software	CDS Software
Ice World (aka アイスワールド)	1986	Puzzle - Action puzzle	✓	✓	✓	✓	The Casio	Casio
Icicle Works	1984	Puzzle	✓	✓	✓	✓	State Soft	State Soft
Idaten Ikase Otoko 1 – I Want to Meet Mugiko (aka 韋駄天いかせ男1 麦子に逢いたい)	1989	Puzzle/Adult/Quiz	✓	✓	✓	✓	Family Soft	Family Soft
Idaten Ikase Otoko 2 – The Meaning of Life (aka 韋駄天いかせ男2 人生の意味)	1989	Puzzle/Adult/Quiz	✓	✓	✓	✓	Family Soft	Family Soft
Idaten Ikase Otoko 3 – After the War (aka 韋駄天いかせ男3 戦後編)	1989	Puzzle/Adult/Quiz	✓	✓	✓	✓	Family Soft	Family Soft
Ide Yosuke Meijin no Jissen Mahjong	1988	Board game - Mahjong	✗	✓	✓	✓	Capcom	Pack-In-Video
Ikari Warriors (aka 怒・IKARI)	1987	Vertical Shooter - Commando	✗	✓	✓	✓	SNK	SNK
Iligks Episode One: Theseus (aka テセウス)	1984	Maze/Platformer	✓	✓	✓	✓	ASCII Corporation	ASCII Corporation
Iligks Episode IV (aka The Maze of Illegus, Iriegas, イリーガスエピソードIV)	1984	First-person maze	✓	✓	✓	✓	ASCII Corporation	ASCII Corporation
Illumina (aka イルミナ！)	1991	Rpg/Adult	✗	✓	✓	✓	Cocktail Soft	Cocktail Soft
Illusion City	1991		✗	✗	✗	✓		Micro Cabin
Illusions	1985	Maze	✓	✓	✓	✓	Nice Ideas	Nice Ideas
Imitation is Unlovable (aka イミテーションは愛せない)	1990	Adventure/Adult	✗	✓	✓	✓	Great	Great
Inca I	1987	Platformer	✓	✓	✓	✓	Double Brain!	Eaglesoft
Indiana Jones and the Last Crusade	1989	Action-platformer	✓	✓	✓	✓	U.S. Gold	Erbe Software
Indiana Jones and the Temple of Doom	1987	Action	✓	✓	✓	✓	Atari Games	U.S. Gold
Indoor Race	1987	Racing - Formula	✓	✓	✓	✓	Mind Games España	Mind Games España
Indian no Bouken	1983		✓	✓	✓	✓	Hudson Soft	Hudson Soft
Indy 500	1987	Racing	✓	✓	✓	✓	Methodic Solutions	Methodic Solutions
Infernal Miner	1985	Platform	✓	✓	✓	✓	Sprites	Sprites
Information Race (aka سباق المعلومات)	1990	Educational	✗	✓	✓	✓	Al Alamiah	Al Alamiah
Ingrid's Back!	1988	Adventure/Text only	✓	✓	✓	✓	Level 9 Computing	Level 9 Computing
The Inheritance: Panic in Las Vegas (aka L'Héritage - Panique à Las Vegas, La Herencia)	1986	Adventure/Casino games	✓	✓	✓	✓	Infogrames	Infogrames
Inindo: Way of the Ninja (aka 伊忍道打倒信長)	1991	Rpg	✗	✓	✓	✓	KOEI	KOEI
Inspecteur Z (aka Bull and Mighty's Slim Chance, ブルとマイティー危機一髪)	1986	Action-platformer	✓	✓	✓	✓	HAL Laboratory	HAL Laboratory
Inter Stellar (aka インターステラ)	1985	Shoot-'em-up	✓	✓	✓	✓	LaserDisc Corporation	LaserDisc Corporation
International Karate	1986	Fighting - Karate	✓	✓	✓	✓	Endurance Games	Endurance Games
Intrépido	1988	Maze	✓	✓	✓	✓	Mind Games España	Mind Games España
Intruder (aka イントルーダー桜屋敷の探索)	1989	Adventure/Adult	✗	✓	✓	✓	Alice Soft	Alice Soft
Intérieur	1985	Adventure	✓	✓	✓	✓	Eric von Ascheberg	Sprites
Invader Nostalgic (aka インベーダーノスタルジック)	1986	Vertical shooter	✓	✓	✓	✓	MSX Magazine (JP)	P.P.P. Ediciones / ASCII Corporation
Invaders	1986	Shoot-'em-up	✓	✓	✓	✓	Livewire	Livewire
Invasion	1987	Simulation	✓	✓	✓	✓	Mastertronic	Bulldog
Invierte y Gana	1986	Business simulation	✓	✓	✓	✓	DIMensionNEW	Idealogic
Ishin no Arashi (aka 維新の嵐)	1988	Strategy	✗	✓	✓	✓	KOEI	KOEI
J.B. Harold's Case File #1 – Murder Club – (aka J.B.ハロルドの事件簿#1～殺人倶楽部)	1988	Adventure	✗	✓	✓	✓	Riverhill Soft Inc.	Microcabin
J.B. Harold's Case File #2 – Manhattan Requiem – (aka J.B.ハロルドの事件簿#2～マンハッタンレクイエム)	1988	Adventure	✗	✓	✓	✓	Riverhill Soft Inc.	Riverhill Soft Inc.
J.B. Harold's Case File #3: D.C. Connection (aka J.B.ハロルドの事件簿#3～D.C.コネクション)	1989	Adventure	✗	✓	✓	✓	Riverhill Soft Inc.	Riverhill Soft Inc.
J.B. Harold's Case File: Kiss of Murder (aka JBハロルドの事件簿～殺意の接吻)	1988	Adventure	✗	✓	✓	✓	Riverhill Soft Inc.	Riverhill Soft Inc.
J. P. Winkle (aka J．P．ウインクル)	1986	Platform-puzzle	✓	✓	✓	✓	MSX Magazine	ASCII Corporation
J.R.R. Tolkien's War in Middle Earth	1989	Strategy	✓	✓	✓	✓	Melbourne House	Dro Soft
Jabato	1989	Interactive fiction	✓	✓	✓	✓	Aventuras AD	Dinamic
Jack Nicklaus' Greatest 18 Holes of Major Championship Golf	1990		✗	✓	✓	✓		Victor Musical Industries
Jack the Nipper	1986	Platform-adventure	✓	✓	✓	✓	Gremlin Graphics	Gremlin Graphics
Jack the Nipper II: In Coconut Capers	1987	Platform-adventure	✓	✓	✓	✓	Gremlin Graphics	Gremlin Graphics
Jackie Chan's Project A (aka プロジェクトA)	1984	Beat 'em up	✓	✓	✓	✓	Pony Canyon	Pony Canyon
Jackson City	1990	Vertical shooter	✓	✓	✓	✓	Diabolic	G.LL. Software
Jagur-5: Golden Triangle (aka ジャガー5)	1987	Multidirectional shooter	✓	✓	✓	✓	Compile	Hudson Soft
Jai Alai	1991	Sport games	✓	✓	✓	✓	Opera Soft	Opera Soft
Janka (aka 雀華)	1985	Board games/Adult	✓	✓	✓	✓	ASCII Corporation / UCHUDO	UCHUDO
Janken Hazuki chan (aka じゃんけん葉月ちゃん)	1990	Adult/Yakyuuken	✗	✓	✓	✓	Data System	Data System
Janyu Mahjong (aka 雀友)	1987	Board games	✓	✓	✓	✓	Tecno Soft	Tecno Soft
Jaws	1989		✓	✓	✓	✓	Screen 7	Intelligent Design LTD
Jesus (aka ジーザス)	1987	Adventure (All)	✗	✓	✓	✓	ENIX	ENIX
Jet Bomber	1986	Isometric shooter	✓	✓	✓	✓	The Bytebusters	Aackosoft
Jet Fighter (Aacksoft)	1985	Isometric shooter	✓	✓	✓	✓	Aackosoft	Aackosoft
Jet Fighter (Eurosoft)	1988	Simulation	✓	✓	✓	✓	Eurosoft	Premium III Software Distribution
Jet Set Willy	1984	Platformer	✓	✓	✓	✓	Software Projects	Software Projects
Jet Set Willy II	1985	Platformer	✓	✓	✓	✓	Software Projects	Software Projects
Jigsaw Set (aka ジグソーセット)	1983	Puzzle - Jigsaw	✓	✓	✓	✓	MIA	MIA
Jipshi	1988	Variety/Fortune Telling	✗	✓	✓	✓	Champion Soft	Champion Soft
Joe Blade	1989	Action-adventure	✓	✓	✓	✓	Players	Players
Johny Comomolo in 3-2-1 Fire	1986	Fixed shooter	✓	✓	✓	✓	Juliet Software	Dro Soft
The Joker (aka ジョーカー)	1992	Visual Novel	✗	✓	✓	✓	Birdy Soft	Birdy Soft
Joker 2 (aka ジョーカーII)	1992	Visual Novel	✗	✓	✓	✓	Birdy Soft	Birdy Soft
Jony y el Trono del Jaguar	1986	Platformer	✓	✓	✓	✓	Ángel García Delgado	Grupo de Trabajo Software
joTunn (aka ヨトゥーン)	1988	Rpg	✗	✓	✓	✓	Sein Soft / XAIN Soft / Zainsoft	Sein Soft / XAIN Soft / Zainsoft
Journey to the Centre of the Earth	1985	Adventure	✓	✓	✓	✓	Bug-Byte Software	Bug-Byte Software / Mind Games España
Ju・star (aka ジャスター)	1990	Multi-directional	✗	✓	✓	✓	EMGVT	Compile
Juega... Pero Seguro	1989	Arcade	✓	✓	✓	✓	OMK Software	Mind Games España
Juego De La Moncloa	1987	Simulation	✓	✓	✓	✓	J.V. Ramírez	ABC-Soft
Juegos de Inteligencia	1986	Educational	✓	✓	✓	✓	Ace Software S.A.	Ace Software S.A.
Jump (Zigurat)	1992	Arcade	✓	✓	✓	✓	Zigurat	Zigurat
Jump (aka ジャンプ) (ASCII)	1985	Action	✓	✓	✓	✓	Mass Tael	ASCII Corporation
Jump Coaster	1984	Single-screen platformer	✓	✓	✓	✓	Nippon Columbia	Colpax/Sony Spain
Jump Land (aka ジャンプランド)	1985	Action	✓	✓	✓	✓	Nippon Columbia	Colpax / Microbyte
Jump Jet	1985	Flight simulator	✓	✓	✓	✓	Anirog Software	Anirog Software
Jumpin' Jack	1986	Action	✓	✓	✓	✓	Livewire	Livewire
Jumping Jack	1984	Variety/Arcade	✓	✓	✓	✓	James Ralph	Spectravideo (SVI)
Jumping Rabbit (aka ジャンピングラビット)	1984	Action	✓	✓	✓	✓	MIA	MIA / Gradiente
Jumpy Dumpy	1985	Action	✓	✓	✓	✓	Indescomp	Sony Spain
Jungle Jim	1984	Action - Timing	✓	✓	✓	✓	Bernd Jöllenbeck GMBH	Spectravideo
Jungle Warrior	1990	Arcade	✓	✓	✓	✓	True Software	Zigurat
Junior Mate (aka ジュニアメイト)	1987	Variety	✗	✓	✓	✓	Matsushita Electric Industrial	Panasoft
Juno First (aka ジュノファースト)	1983	Shoot-'em-up	✓	✓	✓	✓	Konami	Sony
Juno Lander	1984	Action	✓	✓	✓	✓	Bernd Jöllenbeck GMBH	Spectravideo (SVI) / Indescomp
Jyansei (aka 雀聖)	1986	Board games	✗	✓	✓	✓	Chatnoir	Sony
Kaeru Shooter (aka カエルシューター)	1984	Rail shooter	✓	✓	✓	✓	Hudson Soft	Honeybee Soft
Kageroh Labyrinth (aka 陽炎ラビリンス)	1990	Adventure/Adult	✗	✓	✓	✓	Heart Soft	Heart Soft
Kamikaze	1991	Shoot-'em-up	✗	✓	✓	✓	Omega System	Omega System
Karamaru's Strange Trip (aka カラマルの不思議な旅)	1984	Adventure	✓	✓	✓	✓	HAL Laboratory	HAL Laboratory
Karate	1986	Fighting	✓	✓	✓	✓	Courbois Software	Courbois Software
Karateka	1986	Action	✓	✓	✓	✓	Broderbund Software	Ariolasoft
Karuizawa Kidnapping Guide (aka 軽井沢誘拐案内)	1985	Adventure	✗	✓	✓	✓	Enix	Enix
Katmosis	1986	Puzzle	✗	✓	✓	✓	J. Mateos	ABC-Soft / Accion
Katori-Sens	1990	Strategy	✓	✓	✓	✓	UCHUDO	UCHUDO
Kazuo Morita's Othello	1984	Board games	✓	✓	✓	✓	Random House	ASCII Corporation
Ke Rulen Los Petas	1990	Action	✓	✓	✓	✓	Iber Soft	Iber Soft
Kenpelen Chess	1986	Board game - Chess	✗	✓	✓	✓	Andromeda Software	Pony Canyon
Kenritsu MSX Original Software Vol. 1	1986	Compilation	✓	✓	✓	✓	Kenritsu Micro Computer Systems	Kenritsu Micro Computer Systems
Keystone Kapers	1984	Platformer	✓	✓	✓	✓	Activision	Pony Canyon/Activision
Khazzad-Dum	1989	Platform-adventure	✓	✓	✓	✓	SPE	System 4
Kick It! (aka キック・イット)	1986	Action	✓	✓	✓	✓	The Bytebusters	Seika Romox
Kiki Kaikai (aka 奇々怪界)	1987	Action	✗	✓	✓	✓	TAITO	Sony
Killer Station Biotech	1985	Action	✓	✓	✓	✓	Hudson Soft	Hudson Soft
Kimagure Orange Road (aka きまぐれオレンジ☆ロード)	1988	Adventure	✗	✓	✓	✓	Microcabin	Microcabin
Kin-niku man, Colosseum Deathmatch (aka キン肉マンコロシアムデスマッチ)	1985	Sport games/One-on-one fighting	✓	✓	✓	✓	BANDAI	BANDAI
Kinetic Connection (aka キネティックコネクション)	1986	Puzzle	✗	✓	✓	✓	Sadato Taneda	Sony
King (aka 王将)	1984	Board games	✓	✓	✓	✓	Microcabin	Microcabin
King & Balloon	1984	Fixed shooter	✓	✓	✓	✓	Namco	Namco
King Kong 2: Yomigaeru Densetsu	1986		✗	✓	✓	✓	Konami	Konami
King Leonard	1986	Platformer	✓	✓	✓	✓	Mind Games España	Mind Games España
King Size – 50 Games in One Pack	1988	Compilation	✓	✓	✓	✓	Robtek Software	Robtek Software
King's Knight (aka King' Knight, キングスナイト)	1986	Vertical shooter	✓	✓	✓	✓	Square	Square
King's Valley	1985	Platform-adventure	✓	✓	✓	✓	Konami	Konami
King's Valley II (aka エルギーザの封印)	1988	Platform-adventure	✓	✓	✓	✓	Konami	Konami
King's Valley II (MSX2) (aka エルギーザの封印)	1988	Platform-adventure	✗	✓	✓	✓	Konami	Konami
Kisei (aka 棋聖)	1987	Board games	✗	✓	✓	✓	Shogi Master	Sony
Klaverjassen	1988	Card game - Klaverjas	✓	✓	✓	✓	Kees Reedjik	Timesoft
Klax	1990	Tile-matching	✓	✓	✓	✓	Domark	Domark/Erbe Software
Knight Ghost	1987	Action	✓	✓	✓	✓	Juliet Software	Dro Soft
Knight Lore	1986	Isometric platformer	✓	✓	✓	✓	Ultimate Play the Game	Ultimate Play the Game
Knight Tyme	1986	Graphic adventure	✓	✓	✓	✓	David Jones	Mastertronic
Knight Orc	1987	Interactive fiction	✓	✓	✓	✓	Level 9 Computing	Rainbird Software
Knightmare	1986	Vertical shooter	✓	✓	✓	✓	Konami	Konami
Knightmare III - Shalom (aka シャロム)	1987	Rpg	✓	✓	✓	✓	Konami	Konami
Knither Special (aka ナイザースペシャル)	1987	Action-platformer	✓	✓	✓	✓	Dempa Micomsoft	Dempa Micomsoft
The Koi-Koi and Hana-Awase (aka THEこいこいAND花合わせ)	1985	Board games/Cards games/Gambling / Fruit Machine	✓	✓	✓	✓	Nippon Columbia	Colpax
Koji Tanigawa's Shogi Instruction (aka 谷川浩司の将棋指南)	1986	Board games	✓	✓	✓	✓	Pony Canyon	Pony Canyon
Koji Tanigawa's Shogi Instruction II (aka 谷川浩司の将棋指南II)	1988	Board games	✗	✓	✓	✓	Pony Canyon	Pony Canyon
Konami's Baseball (aka コナミのベースボール)	1985	Sports - Baseball	✓	✓	✓	✓	Konami	Konami
Konami's Billiards (aka ビデオハスラー) / Video Hustler	1983	Sports - Billiards	✓	✓	✓	✓	Konami	Konami
Konami's Boxing (aka コナミのボクシング)	1985	Sports - Boxing	✓	✓	✓	✓	Konami	Konami
Konami's Football (aka Konami's Soccer, コナミのサッカー)	1985	Sports - Soccer	✓	✓	✓	✓	Konami	Konami
Konami's Golf (aka コナミのゴルフ)	1985	Sports - Golf	✓	✓	✓	✓	Konami	Konami
Konami's Mahjong (aka コナミの麻雀道場)	1984	Board games	✓	✓	✓	✓	Konami	Konami
Konami's Ping Pong	1985	Sports - Ping Pong	✓	✓	✓	✓	Konami	Konami
Konami's Tennis (aka コナミのテニス)	1985	Sports - Tennis	✓	✓	✓	✓	Konami	Konami
Konami's Uranai Sensation (aka コナミの占いセンセーション)	1988	Variety/Fortune telling	✗	✓	✓	✓	Konami	Konami
Koneko no dai bouken: Chibi-chan ga iku (aka 仔猫の大冒険)	1986	Platformer	✓	✓	✓	✓	Casio	Casio
Kong	1988	Platform	✓	✓	✓	✓	Eurosoft	Premium III Software Distribution
Kong's Revenge	1991	Arcade	✓	✓	✓	✓	Zigurat	Zigurat
Koronis Rift (aka コロニスリフト)	1986	Action	✗	✓	✓	✓	Activision / Lucasfilm Games	Pony Canyon
Krakout	1987	Block breaker	✓	✓	✓	✓	Gremlin Graphics	Gremlin Graphics
Krom, El Guerrero Invencible	1989	Action	✓	✓	✓	✓	OMK Software	Proein Soft Line
Kruiswoord	1986	Puzzle	✗	✓	✓	✓	Radarsoft	Philips / Aackosoft
Krypton	1985	Arcade	✓	✓	✓	✓	Manhattan Transfer	MSX Club (ES)
Kubus	1985	Action - Isometric	✓	✓	✓	✓	Simon K. Overy	Kuma Computers
Kudokikata Oshiemasu (aka 口説き方教えます)	1988	Visual Novel/Adult	✗	✓	✓	✓	HARD	HARD
Kudokikata Oshiemasu Part II: Kind Gal's (aka 口説き方教えますPart-IIカインドゥ・ギャルズ)	1988	Visual Novel/Adult	✗	✓	✓	✓	HARD	HARD
Kung Fu Great Lord (aka 功夫大君)	1984	Action	✓	✓	✓	✓	Seibu Kaihatsu	Toshiba-EMI Ltd.
Kung Fu Master (aka クンフーマスター)	1983	Action	✓	✓	✓	✓	Mass Tael	ASCII Corporation
Kunio Naito's Tsume Shogi (aka 内藤国雄の詰将棋)	1984	Board games	✓	✓	✓	✓	Apollo Technica	Apollo Technica
Kyan Kyan Collection (aka キャンキャンコレクション)	1989	Adult/Graphics	✗	✓	✓	✓	I-cell	I-cell
Kyoto Dragon Temple Murder (aka 京都龍の寺殺人事件)	1988	Adventure	✗	✓	✓	✓	TAITO	TAITO
Kyōran no Ginga: Schwarzschild (aka 狂嵐の銀河 シュヴァルツシルト)	1989	Strategy	✗	✓	✓	✓	Kogado Studio	Kogado Studio
Kōnai Shasei Vol.1 (aka 校内写生1巻)	1991	Visual Novel/Adult	✗	✓	✓	✓	Fairytale	Fairytale
Kōnai Shasei Vol.2 (aka 校内写生2巻)	1991	Visual Novel/Adult	✗	✓	✓	✓	Fairytale	Fairytale
Kōnai Shasei Vol.3 (aka 校内写生3巻)	1991	Visual Novel/Adult	✗	✓	✓	✓	Fairytale	Fairytale
L（ELLE）	1992	Adventure/Eroge	✗	✓	✓	✓	ELF Corporation	ELF Corporation
L'Affaire	1986		✗	✓	✓	✓		Pack-In-Video
L'Empereur (aka ランペルール)	1990	Strategy	✗	✓	✓	✓	KOEI	KOEI
La Abadía del Crimen (aka The Abbey of Crime)	1987	Graphic adventure	✓	✓	✓	✓	Mister Chip	Opera Soft
La Abeja Sabia 1 - Formas Geometricas	1986	Educational	✓	✓	✓	✓	Anaya Multimedia	Sony Spain
La Abeja Sabia 2 - Seriaciones	1986	Educational	✓	✓	✓	✓	Anaya Multimedia	Sony Spain
La Abeja Sabia 3 - Analisis: Forma y Color	1986	Educational	✓	✓	✓	✓	Anaya Multimedia	Sony Spain
La Aventura Espacial	1990	Graphic adventure	✓	✓	✓	✓	Aventuras AD	Aventuras AD
La Aventura Original	1989	Graphic adventure	✓	✓	✓	✓	Aventuras AD	Dinamic
La battaglia delle Ardenne	1986	Strategy	✓	✓	✓	✓	Philips Italy	Philips Italy
La Computadora Adivina	1985	Quiz	✓	✓	✓	✓	Indescomp	Indescomp
La Espada Sagrada	1990	Adventure	✓	✓	✓	✓	Topo Soft	Erbe Software
La Geste d'Artillac	1984	Adventure	✓	✓	✓	✓	Infogrames	Infogrames
La Isla Misteriosa	1985	Adventure	✓	✓	✓	✓	EdiSoft	EdiSoft
La Liebre y la Tortuga	1985	Educational	✓	✓	✓	✓	ACE Software S.A.	Eurosoft
La Piramide de Keops	1986	Puzzle	✓	✓	✓	✓	AGD	AGD
La Venganza de Johny Comomolo	1987	Action	✓	✓	✓	✓	Juliet Software	Dro Soft
Labboss	1987	Puzzle	✓	✓	✓	✓	Cleversoft	Cleversoft
Laberinto	1985	Adventure	✓	✓	✓	✓	J. Sánchez Armas	Advance
Labyrinth: The Computer Game (aka ラビリンス魔王の迷宮)	1987	Action/Adventure	✗	✓	✓	✓	Pack-In-Video	Pack-In-Video
Ladder Building (aka ラダービルディング)	1983	Action	✓	✓	✓	✓	ASCII Corporation	ASCII Corporation
Ladies Club (aka お嬢様くらぶ)	1988	Cards games	✗	✓	✓	✓	Tokuma Communications / DTB Software	Technopolis Soft
Lady Safari	1988	Action-adventure	✓	✓	✓	✓	OMK Software	Discovery Informatic
Lancelot	1988	Adventure	✓	✓	✓	✓	Level 9 Computing	Mandarin Software
Lander	1985	Unknown	✓	✓	✓	✓	Marco Zanchi	Freedom Software / Visiogame / Play Vision
Laptick'2 (aka らぷてっく2)	1985		✓	✓	✓	✓	dB-SOFT	dB-SOFT
Las Tres Luces de Glaurung	1986	Arcade	✓	✓	✓	✓	Erbe Software	Erbe Software
Las Vegas Video Poker	1986	Cards games	✓	✓	✓	✓	Mastertronic	Entertainment USA
Laser Squad	1989	Turn-based tactics	✓	✓	✓	✓	Target Games	ReFLEX
Last Armageddon (aka ラスト・ハルマゲドン)	1988	Rpg	✗	✓	✓	✓	Brain Grey	Brain Grey
The Last Dungeon		Rpg	✓	✓	✓	✓	Grupo de Trabajo Software (G.T.S.)	Grupo de Trabajo Software (G.T.S.)
The Last Mission	1987	Shoot-'em-up	✓	✓	✓	✓	Opera Soft	Opera Soft
The Last Mission (MSX2)	1987	Shoot-'em-up	✗	✓	✓	✓	Opera Soft	Opera Soft
The Laughing Salesman	1991		✗	✓	✓	✓	Compile	Compile
Laydock (aka レイドック)	1986		✗	✓	✓	✓	T&E Soft	T&E Soft
Laydock 2 - Last Attack (aka レイドック2)	1988		✗	✗	✓	✓	T&E Soft	T&E Soft
Lazer Bykes	1985	Action - Tron	✓	✓	✓	✓	PSS	PSS
Lazy Jones	1985	Platformer	✓	✓	✓	✓	Terminal Software	Terminal Software
Le Mans	1984	Racing - Formula	✓	✓	✓	✓	Electric Software	Electric Software
Leather Skirts	1987	Puzzle/Adult	✗	✓	✓	✓	Methodic Solutions	Methodic Solutions
Legend	1988	Fixed shooter	✓	✓	✓	✓	Genesis Soft	MCM Software
The Legend of Kage (aka 影の伝説)	1986	Action-platformer	✓	✓	✓	✓	Taito	Nidecom
The Legend of Shonan	1989	Adventure / Text and Gfx	✗	✓	✓	✓	Cross Media Soft	Victor Co. of Japan (JVC)
Legend of the runaway ninja Extra edition (aka 抜忍伝説・番外編)	1988	Variety	✗	✓	✓	✓	Brain Grey	Brain Grey
Legend of the runaway ninja: Men with Wings (aka 抜忍伝説 -翼をもった男たち-)	1988	Adventure	✗	✓	✓	✓	Brain Grey	Brain Grey
Legend of the Throbbing Prince: The Story Thereafter (aka 王子ビンビン物語それから白書)	1988	Rpg	✗	✓	✓	✓	East Cube	East Cube
Legend of White and Black - Aska (aka 白と黒の伝説［アスカ編］)	1987	Adventure	✓	✓	✓	✓	Soft Studio WING	Soft Studio WING
Legend of White and Black - Hyakki edition (aka 白と黒の伝説［百鬼編］)	1985	Adventure	✓	✓	✓	✓	Soft Studio WING	Soft Studio WING
Legend of White and Black - Rinne Tensei Hen (aka 白と黒の伝説［輪廻転生編］)	1986	Adventure	✓	✓	✓	✓	Soft Studio WING	Soft Studio WING
Legendly Nine Gems (aka 九玉伝)	1987	Action	✗	✓	✓	✓	Tecno Soft	Tecno Soft
Legends	1986	Interactive Fiction	✓	✓	✓	✓	Mind Games España	Mind Games España
Legends of Star Arthur - Planet Mephius (aka 惑星メフィウス)	1985	Adventure	✓	✓	✓	✓	T&ESOFT	T&ESOFT / Victor Co. of Japan (JVC) / Toshiba
Legion	1988	Vertical shooter	✓	✓	✓	✓	MSX Magazine (JP) / Tetsuto Someya	ASCII Corporation
Lenam: Sword of Legend	1990		✗	✓	✓	✓		Hertz
Les Flics	1985	Maze/Single-screen platformer	✓	✓	✓	✓	PSS	PSS
Les Voitures dans Autoroute	1985	Arcade	✓	✓	✓	✓	Infogrames	Infogrames
Let's Take the A-Train	1989		✗	✓	✓	✓	Pony Canyon	Pony Canyon
Lettergrijper	1986	Variety	✓	✓	✓	✓	Aschcom	Aschcom / Filosoft
Liberator	1989	Arcade	✓	✓	✓	✓	PJ Soft	Proein Soft Line
Lick and Mick Adventure (aka りっくとみっくの大冒険)	1987	Action	✗	✓	✓	✓	Humming Bird Soft	Humming Bird Soft
Liebre y Tortuga	1985	Puzzle	✓	✓	✓	✓	Club Sony MSX	Club Sony MSX
Life in the Fast Lane	1987	Third-person shooter	✓	✓	✓	✓	The Bytebusters	Methodic Solutions
Light Corridor	1990	Puzzle - First-person/Action - Timing	✓	✓	✓	✓	Infogrames	Infogrames
Lightly Roller (aka すいすいローラー)	1985	Action	✓	✓	✓	✓	Gakken	Gakken
Lightning Bacchus: The Knight of Iron (aka ライトニングバッカス)	1989	Action/Rpg	✗	✓	✓	✓	NCS	NCS
Like the Monkey King (aka まるで孫悟空)	1984	Action	✓	✓	✓	✓	Ample Software	Ample Software
Line Buster	1991	Shoot-'em-up	✓	✓	✓	✓	Raketto Co-Ax / Alex	Raketto Co-Ax / Alex
Linguaggio Macchina MSX N°5	1986	Educational	✓	✓	✓	✓	Gruppo Editoriale International Education	Gruppo Editoriale International Education
Lipstick Adventure	1989	Adventure/Adult	✗	✓	✓	✓	JAST / Fairytale	Fairytale
Lipstick Adventure 2	1990	Adventure/Adult	✗	✓	✓	✓	JAST / Fairytale	Fairytale
Little Vampire (aka リトル・バンパイア)	1988	Adventure	✗	✓	✓	✓	Alice Soft	Alice Soft
The Living Daylights	1987	Action / Shoot-'em-up	✓	✓	✓	✓	Walking Circles Software	Imagine Software
Livingstone, I Presume (aka Livingstone Supongo)	1986	Platform-adventure	✓	✓	✓	✓	Opera Soft	Opera Soft
Livingstone, I Presume (MSX2)	1986	Platform-adventure	✗	✓	✓	✓	Opera Soft	Philips Spain
Livingstone II (aka Livingstone Supongo II)	1989	Platform-adventure	✓	✓	✓	✓	Opera Soft	Opera Soft
Lizard (aka リザード)	1985	Rpg	✓	✓	✓	✓	Microcabin	Microcabin
Locke the Superman - Asteroid Kahn (aka 超人ロック 魔女のミレニアム)	1984	Action	✗	✓	✓	✓	Pony Canyon	Pony Canyon
Lode Runner	1983	Single-screen platformer/Puzzle - Action puzzle	✓	✓	✓	✓	Programmers-3	Sony
Lode Runner II	1985	Single-screen platformer/Puzzle - Action puzzle	✓	✓	✓	✓	Compile	Sony
Lonesome Tank (aka ロンサム・タンク進撃)	1984	Action	✓	✓	✓	✓	MIA	Sony Spain
Lord Over (aka ロードオーバー)	1984	Strategy	✓	✓	✓	✓	ASCII Corporation	ASCII Corporation
Lord Watson	1985	Action	✓	✓	✓	✓	Manhattan Transfer	MSX Club (ES)
Lords of Time	1983	Interactive fiction	✓	✓	✓	✓	Level 9 Computing	Level 9 Computing
Loriciels Runner	1986	Action	✓	✓	✓	✓	Loriciels	Loriciels
Lorita Paradox	1991	Adventure	✗	✓	✓	✓	System House OH	System House OH
Lorna	1990	Beat 'em up	✓	✓	✓	✓	Topo Soft	Erbe Software
Los Inhumanos	1990	Action	✓	✓	✓	✓	Diabolic	G.LL. Software
Lot Lot	1985		✓	✓	✓	✓		Technopolis Soft
Lotto	1985	Quiz	✓	✓	✓	✓	Philips Germany	Philips Germany
Love Chaser	1988	Puzzle	✓	✓	✓	✓	Champion Soft	Champion Soft
Love to Casablanca: Murderer Over Time and Space (aka ラブ・トゥ・カサブランカ 時空殺人)	1988	Adventure	✗	✓	✓	✓	Thinking Rabbit	Thinking Rabbit
Lovely Horror: Ochamena Yuurei (aka ラブリーホラー おちゃめな幽霊)	1989	Adventure/Adult	✗	✓	✓	✓	Studio Angel	Studio Angel
Lunar Ball	1985		✓	✓	✓	✓	Compile	Pony
Lupin the 3rd: Castle of Cagliostro	1987	Platformer	✗	✓	✓	✓	Toho	Toho
Lupin the 3rd: Legend of the Gold of Babylon	1988	Platformer	✗	✓	✓	✓	Toho	Toho
M-47 Combate de Blindados	1988	Strategy/War	✓	✓	✓	✓	EdiSoft	EdiSoft
M-Droid	1987	Shoot-em-up	✓	✓	✓	✓	Blue Ribbon Software	Blue Ribbon Software
M.U.L.E.	1985	Strategy/Economy	✓	✓	✓	✓	BPS Electronic Arts	Electronic Arts
Mac Attack	1986	Action	✓	✓	✓	✓	The Bytebusters	Aackosoft
Macadam Bumber	1985	Pinball	✓	✓	✓	✓	ERE Informatique	ERE Informatique
Mach 3	1987	Arcade	✓	✓	✓	✓	Loriciels	Loriciels
Machinegun Joe vs. The Mafia (aka マシンガン・ジョーVSザ・マフィア)	1984	Action	✓	✓	✓	✓	Hudson Soft	Hudson Soft
Macross Countdown (aka マクロス・カウントダウン)	1985	Horizontal shooter	✓	✓	✓	✓	Alex Bros	Bothtec/Eaglesoft
Mad Mix Game	1988	Maze - Pac-Man	✓	✓	✓	✓	Topo Soft	Erbe Software
Mad Mix 2: En el Castillo de los Fantasmas	1990	Arcade	✓	✓	✓	✓	Topo Soft	Erbe Software
Mad Rider (aka マッドライダー)	1985	Racing	✗	✓	✓	✓	Carry Lab	Carry Lab
Mad Fox	1988	Action	✓	✓	✓	✓	Manhattan Transfer	Manhattan Transfer
Madō Monogatari 1-2-3	1990		✓	✓	✓	✓	Compile	Compile
Madoushi Lulba	1990		✗	✓	✓	✓	Compile	Compile
Magic Johnson's Basketball	1990		✓	✓	✓	✓	New Frontier	Dro Soft
Magic Pinball	1988	Arcade	✓	✓	✓	✓	OMK Software	Proein Soft Line
Magical Kid Wiz (aka 魔法使いウィズ)	1986	Action-platformer	✓	✓	✓	✓	Seibu Kaihatsu	Sony
Magical Tree (aka マジカルツリー)	1984	Platformer	✓	✓	✓	✓	Konami	Konami
Magnum Kiki Ippatsu: Empire City 1931	1988		✓	✓	✓	✓	Seibu Kaihatsu	Toshiba-EMI
Mah-Jong Crazy (aka ジャン狂)	1984	Board games	✓	✓	✓	✓	Hudson Soft	SoftBank
Mah-Jong Crazy Era Special (aka 麻雀狂時代スペシャル)	1988	Board games/Adult	✗	✓	✓	✓	Micronet Co., Ltd.	Micronet Co., Ltd.
Mahjong Friend (aka 雀フレンド)	1984	Board game - Mahjong	✓	✓	✓	✓	TAITO	Nidecom
Mah-Jong Shark 1 (aka 雀豪①)	1988	Board games	✗	✓	✓	✓	Cross Media Soft	Victor Musical Industries, Inc. (JVC)
Mahjong Crazy Special (aka 麻雀狂スペシャル)	1985	Board games	✓	✓	✓	✓	Ving Soft	Ving Soft
Mahjong Hiden (aka 麻雀秘伝)	1985	Board games	✓	✓	✓	✓	Pax Softonica	Pax Softonica
Mahjong Shikaku (aka 麻雀刺客)	1990	Board games/Adult/Parody	✗	✓	✓	✓	Nichibutsu	Nichibutsu
Mahjong Shikaku Gaiden: Hana no Momoko Gumi! (aka 麻雀刺客外伝 花のももこ組！)	1991	Board games/Adult	✗	✓	✓	✓	Nichibutsu	Nichibutsu
Main Event (aka メインイベント)	1985	Sport games	✓	✓	✓	✓	Youichi Takahira	ASCII Corporation
Maison Ikkoku Final (aka めぞん一刻・完結編)	1988	Adventure	✗	✓	✓	✓	Microcabin	Microcabin
Maison Ikkoku: Omoide no Photograph (aka めぞん一刻～想いでのフォトグラフ～)	1987	Adventure/Text and Gfx	✗	✓	✓	✓	Microcabin	Microcabin
Majin Kyu (aka 魔神宮)	1988	Rpg	✗	✓	✓	✓	Sein Soft / XAIN Soft / Zainsoft	Sein Soft / XAIN Soft / Zainsoft
Major Pistoletov - Episode 1: "Kaschey" (aka Майор Пистолетов — Первая серия: «Кащей»)	1988	Platform	✓	✓	✓	✓	A.R. Crazysoft	A.R. Crazysoft
Makyu Den (aka 魔宮殿)	1989	Adventure	✗	✓	✓	✓	Soft Studio WING	Soft Studio WING
Malaya's Treasure (aka マラヤの秘宝)	1988	Action	✗	✓	✓	✓	Pony Canyon	Pony Canyon
Mambo	1989	Run and gun	✓	✓	✓	✓	Positive Software	Positive Software
Manchester United	1988	Action/Sport management	✓	✓	✓	✓	Krisalis Software Ltd.	Krisalis Software Ltd. / System 4
Mandragore	1986	Rpg	✓	✓	✓	✓	Infogrames	Infogrames
Manes (aka メイニーズ)	1984	Action - Timing/Maze	✓	✓	✓	✓	ZAP	ASCII Corporation
Manic Miner	1984	Platformer/Puzzle - Action puzzle	✓	✓	✓	✓	Software Projects	Software Projects
Mantis 1	1989	Adventure	✓	✓	✓	✓	Raven	MCM Software
Mantis 2	1989	Adventure	✓	✓	✓	✓	Raven	MCM Software
Mapgame	1985	Educational	✓	✓	✓	✓	Erbe Software	Erbe Software
Mappy	1984	Platformer	✓	✓	✓	✓	Namco	Namco
Marcianos	1985	Fixed shooter - Space Invaders	✓	✓	✓	✓	Manhattan Transfer	MSX Club (ES)
Martianoids	1987		✓	✓	✓	✓		Ultimate Play The Game
Märchen Paradise	1990	Adventure	✗	✓	✓	✓	Great	Great
Märchen Veil	1985		✓	✓	✓	✓	System Sacom	System Sacom
Märchen Veil (MSX2)	1987		✗	✓	✓	✓	System Sacom	System Sacom
Marine Battle (aka マリンバトル)	1983	Action	✓	✓	✓	✓	ASCII Corporation	ASCII Corporation
Masashi Tashiro Has So Many Princesses (aka 田代まさしのプリンセスがいっぱい)	1989	Action/Platform	✗	✓	✓	✓	CBS/SONY	HAL Laboratory
Mashō Denki La Valeur (aka 魔晶伝紀 La Valeur)	1990	Rpg	✗	✓	✓	✓	Kogado Studio	Kogado Studio
Mask II	1987	Action	✓	✓	✓	✓	Gremlin Graphics	Gremlin Graphics
Mask III: Venom Strikes Back	1988	Action	✓	✓	✓	✓	Gremlin Graphics	Gremlin Graphics
Master Chess	1987	Board games	✓	✓	✓	✓	Mastertronic	Mastertronic
Master of Monsters (aka マスターオブモンスターズ)	1989	Simulation/Strategy	✗	✓	✓	✓	System Soft	System Soft
Master of the Lamps	1985		✓	✓	✓	✓	Activision	Activision
Master Takahashi's Adventure Island (aka 高橋名人の冒険島)	1986	Action/Platform	✓	✓	✓	✓	Hudson Soft	Hudson Soft
Masters of the Universe	1987		✓	✓	✓	✓		Gremlin Graphics
Match Day II	1986	Sports - Soccer	✗	✓	✓	✓	Ocean Software	Ocean Software
Maths Invaders	1984	Shoot-em Up/Educational	✓	✓	✓	✓	Stell Software	Stell Software
Maxima	1986	Arcade	✓	✓	✓	✓	PSS	PSS
MaxPoker	1986	Cards games	✗	✓	✓	✓	Maxbyte	Maxbyte
Mayhem	1985		✓	✓	✓	✓		Mr. Micro
Maze Cup Champion	1984	Action	✓	✓	✓	✓	James Ralph	James Ralph
Maze Master	1988	Maze	✓	✓	✓	✓	Eurosoft	Eurosoft
Maze Max	1988	Maze	✓	✓	✓	✓	Loriciels	Loriciels
Maze of Galious (aka Knightmare II: Maze of Galious, ガリウスの迷宮)	1987	Action-adventure	✓	✓	✓	✓	Konami	Konami
Mazes Unlimited	1987	Puzzle	✓	✓	✓	✓	Aackosoft	Aackosoft
Maziacs	1985	Maze	✓	✓	✓	✓	DK'Tronics	Monser
Mean Streets	1988	Adventure	✓	✓	✓	✓	K. J. Ollett	K. J. Ollett
Meaning of Life	1987	Adventure	✓	✓	✓	✓	The Bytebusters	The Bytebusters
Mecano Oasis	1989	Puzzle	✓	✓	✓	✓	Grupo de Trabajo Software (GTS)	Grupo de Trabajo Software (GTS)
Mega Chess	1991	Board games	✓	✓	✓	✓	Genesis Soft / Iber Soft	Genesis Soft / Iber Soft
Megalopolis SOS (aka メガロポリスSOS)	1983	Fixed shooter	✓	✓	✓	✓	Nisso	Compile
Meganova	1988	Horizontal shooter	✓	✓	✓	✓	Dinamic	Dinamic
Megaphoenix	1991	Arcade	✓	✓	✓	✓	Dinamic	Dinamic
Mekong (aka Mecom)	1988	Vertical shooter/Obstacle avoiding	✓	✓	✓	✓	Genesis Soft	Iber Soft
Melon Soda - Sexy Pet (aka メロンソーダ あぶない性涼淫料水)	1989	Visual Novel/Adult	✗	✓	✓	✓	Bond Soft	Bond Soft
Membership Golf (aka メンバーシップゴルフ)	1989	Sport games	✗	✓	✓	✓	KLON	Sony
Memory (aka الذاكرة)	1984	Variety	✓	✓	✓	✓	Al Alamiah	Al Alamiah
Memory Trainer	1984	Variety	✓	✓	✓	✓	Ronex Computer AB	Spectravideo (SVI)
Merlin	1986	Platform	✓	✓	✓	✓	Mind Games España	Mind Games España
Metal Gear (aka メタルギア)	1987	Action-adventure	✗	✓	✓	✓	Konami	Konami
Metal Gear 2: Solid Snake	1990		✗	✓	✓	✓	Konami	Konami
Metropolis	1989	Hack and slash	✓	✓	✓	✓	Tobo Soft	Erbe Software
Meurtres sur l'Atlantique	1986	Investigation	✓	✓	✓	✓	Cobrasoft	Cobrasoft
Michel Fútbol Master	1989	Sports - Soccer	✓	✓	✓	✓	Dinamic	Dinamic
Mid-garts Side A (aka ミッドガルツSIDE－A)	1989	Action	✗	✓	✓	✓	Wolf Team	Wolf Team
Mid-garts Side B (aka ミッドガルツSIDE－B)	1989	Action	✗	✓	✓	✓	Wolf Team	Wolf Team
Midnight Brothers (aka ミッドナイトブラザーズずっこけ探偵)	1986	Adventure	✓	✓	✓	✓	ZAP	Sony
Midnight Building (aka ミッドナイトビルディング)	1983	Action	✓	✓	✓	✓	Way Limit Corporation	ASCII Corporation
Midnight Chase (aka ミッドナイトチェイス)	1986	Adventure	✓	✓	✓	✓	Y. Takahara	ASCII Corporation
Midnight Commander (aka ミッドナイトコマンダー)	1983	Simulation	✓	✓	✓	✓	Microcabin	Microcabin
Midnight Sun Story - Descendant of the Winchesters (aka 白夜物語ウィンチェスター家の末裔)	1988	Adventure	✗	✓	✓	✓	East Cube	East Cube
Might and Magic I: Secret of the Inner Sanctum (aka マイト・アンド・マジック)	1988	Rpg	✗	✓	✓	✓	New World Computing	Starcraft
Might and Magic II: Gates to Another World	1989		✗	✓	✓	✓	New World Computing	Starcraft
Mighty Battle Skin Panic (aka MIGHTYバトルスキンパニック)	1993	Text and Gfx	✗	✓	✓	✓	Gainax	Gainax
Mike Gunner	1988		✓	✓	✓	✓	Dinamic	Dinamic
Miki Va a Esquiar	1986		✓	✓	✓	✓	Genesis Soft / A.G.D.	P.P.P. Ediciones
Miku & Shiori's Nyan Nyan Professional Wrestling (aka ミクとしおりのニャンニャンプロレス)	1986	Sport games	✓	✓	✓	✓	Cross Media Soft	Victor Co. of Japan (JVC)
Military Shogi (aka 軍人将棋)	1987	Board games	✗	✓	✓	✓	KLON	Pack-In-Video
Milk Race	1987		✓	✓	✓	✓		Mastertronic
Minder	1984	Action	✓	✓	✓	✓	DK'Tronics	DK'Tronics
Miner Machine	1986	Rocks and diamonds	✓	✓	✓	✓	Boss Company	Boss Company/Eaglesoft
Mini Golf	1985	Sport games	✓	✓	✓	✓	Namco	Namco
Mini-Golf	1984	Sport games	✓	✓	✓	✓	Advance	Advance
Miracle Warriors: Seal of the Dark Lord	1987	JRPG	✓	✓	✓	✓	Kogado Studio	Kokado Studio
Miracle Warriors: Seal of the Dark Lord (MSX2)	1987	JRPG	✗	✓	✓	✓	Kogado Studio	Kokado Studio
Mirai (aka 未来)	1987	Action/Maze	✓	✓	✓	✓	Xain Soft	Xain Soft
Mirai (MSX2) (aka 未来)	1987	Action/Maze	✗	✓	✓	✓	Xain Soft	Xain Soft
Misión de Combate	1988	Action	✓	✓	✓	✓	ACE Software S.A.	ACE Software S.A.
Misión en España	1989	Action	✓	✓	✓	✓	Mind Games España	Mind Games España
Misión Espacial	1985	Action	✓	✓	✓	✓	J. Sánchez Armas	Advance
Misión Rescate 2 - Secuencias Temporales	1988	Adventure	✓	✓	✓	✓	Anaya Multimedia	Sony Spain
Missile Command	1988	Fixed shooter - Base defense	✓	✓	✓	✓	Eurosoft	Premium III Software Distribution
Mister Gas	1989	Action	✓	✓	✓	✓	Xortrapa Soft	Xortrapa Soft
Misty (aka ミスティ)	1988	Action	✓	✓	✓	✓	Champion Soft	Champion Soft
Mitsume ga Tooru (aka 三つ目がとおる)	1989	Action-adventure	✓	✓	✓	✓	NATSUME	NATSUME
Miyuki Memorial (aka みゆきメモリアル)	1986	Adventure	✗	✓	✓	✓	Kitty Records	Kitty Records
Miyuki: The Gambler (aka みゆきギャンブラー)	1986	Board games	✓	✓	✓	✓	Central Education	Central Education
MJ-05	1983	Action	✓	✓	✓	✓	Hudson Soft	Hudson Soft
Mobile Suit: Gundam (aka 機動戦士ガンダム)	1983	Action/Strategy	✓	✓	✓	✓	Bandai	Bandai
Moero!! Nettou Yakyuu '88	1988		✗	✓	✓	✓	Jaleco	Jaleco
Mole (aka モグラ)	1983	Action	✓	✓	✓	✓	ASCII Corporation	ASCII Corporation
Mole Mole (aka モレモレ)	1985	Action	✓	✓	✓	✓	Cross Media Soft	Victor Co. of Japan (JVC)
Mole Mole (MSX2) (aka モレモレ)	1985	Action	✗	✓	✓	✓	Cross Media Soft	Victor Co. of Japan (JVC)
Mole Mole 2 (aka モレモレ2)	1988	Action	✓	✓	✓	✓	Cross Media Soft	Victor Co. of Japan (JVC)
Mole Panic (aka モールパニック)	1984	Action	✓	✓	✓	✓	Tatsuno System Research	Toshiba
Molecule Man	1986	Isometric maze	✓	✓	✓	✓	Mastertronic	Mastertronic
Mon Mon Monster (aka 悶々怪物)	1989	Action-platformer	✗	✓	✓	✓	GA-Yume	HOT - B
Monkey Academy	1984		✓	✓	✓	✓	Konami	Konami
Monopoly	1985	Board games	✓	✓	✓	✓	Leisure Genius	Leisure Genius
Monster March / Monster Mastermind	1983	Educational	✓	✓	✓	✓	Nihon Maikon Gakuin	Nihon Maikon Gakuin
Monster's Fair (aka モンスターズフェア)	1986	Action/Vertical scroller	✓	✓	✓	✓	TOHO	TOHO
Moon Landing (aka ムーンランディング)	1983	Simulation	✓	✓	✓	✓	ASCII Corporation	ASCII Corporation
Moon Patrol	1984		✓	✓	✓	✓		Dempa Micomsoft
Moonrider	1986	Obstacle avoiding	✓	✓	✓	✓	The Bytebusters	Eaglesoft
Moonsweeper	1985		✓	✓	✓	✓	Imagic	Toshiba-EMI
Moonwalker - The Computer Game	1989	Action	✓	✓	✓	✓	US Gold	Erbe Software
Mopiranger	1985		✓	✓	✓	✓	Konami	Konami
More (aka モア)	1986	Visual Novel	✓	✓	✓	✓	Omega System	Omega System
The Most Amazing Memory Game	1986	Memory game	✓	✓	✓	✓	Ludic-Bit	Idealogic
MOT	1989	Stealth/Action	✓	✓	✓	✓	Opera Soft	Opera Soft
Motor Boat	1989	Sports/Boating	✓	✓	✓	✓	Mind Games España	Mind Games España
Motorbike Madness	1988	Racing	✓	✓	✓	✓	Mastertronic/Binary Design Ltd.	Mastertronic
Mountain Bike Racer	1989	Racing/Sports	✓	✓	✓	✓	Positive	Positive
Mouse Jump	1985	Platformer	✓	✓	✓	✓	Compulogical	S.V.L. Software
Mouser	1983	Platformer	✓	✓	✓	✓	Sony	Sony
Mr Swing of the Window Cleaning Company	1985		✓	✓	✓	✓	Compile	Pony
Mr. Chin (aka ミスター・チン)	1984	Action - Timing	✓	✓	✓	✓	HAL Laboratory	HAL Laboratory
Mr. Do! (aka ミスタードゥ！)	1984	Action	✓	✓	✓	✓	Universal	Colpax
Mr. Do! vs Unicorns (aka ミスタードゥvsユニコーンズ)	1984	Action	✓	✓	✓	✓	Universal	Sony
Mr. Do's Wildride (aka ミスター・ドゥー ワイルドライド)	1985	Action	✓	✓	✓	✓	Universal	Colpax
Mr. Ghost (aka 幽霊君)	1989	Action	✗	✓	✓	✓	System Sacom	System Sacom
Mr. Jaws	1987	Action	✓	✓	✓	✓	The Bytebusters	Eaglesoft
Mr. Wong's Loopy Laundry	1984	Platform	✓	✓	✓	✓	Artic Computing	Artic Computing
Mr.Gomoku (aka Mr．GOMOKU)	1984	Board games	✓	✓	✓	✓	Apollo Technica	Apollo Technica
MS Field Mobile Suit Gundam (aka MSフィールド機動戦士ガンダム)	1988	Simulation	✗	✓	✓	✓	Family Soft	Family Soft
MSX Baseball	1984	Sport games	✓	✓	✓	✓	Matsushita Electric Industrial	National
MSX Baseball II	1986	Sport games	✓	✓	✓	✓	Matsushita Electric Industrial	Panasoft
MSX Board Games 1	1985	Board games	✓	✓	✓	✓	Orpheus	Orpheus
MSX Derby (aka MSXダービー)	1983	Sport games/Gambling / Fruit Machine	✓	✓	✓	✓	ASCII Corporation	ASCII Corporation
MSX Rugby (aka パナソフトのラグビー)	1985	Sport games	✓	✓	✓	✓	Matsushita Electric Industrial	Panasoft
MSX Shogi Game (aka MSX将棋)	1984	Board games	✓	✓	✓	✓	Alpha Denshi	Sony
MSX Soccer (aka パナソフトのサッカー)	1985	Sports - Soccer	✓	✓	✓	✓	Matsushita Electric Industrial	Panasoft
MSX Software Nº1	1986	Variety	✓	✓	✓	✓	Grupo de Trabajo Software (G.T.S.)	Grupo de Trabajo Software (G.T.S.)
MSX Software Nº2	1986	Variety	✓	✓	✓	✓	Grupo de Trabajo Software (G.T.S.)	Grupo de Trabajo Software (G.T.S.)
MSX Software Nº3	1986	Variety	✓	✓	✓	✓	Grupo de Trabajo Software (G.T.S.)	Grupo de Trabajo Software (G.T.S.)
MSX Software Nº4	1985	Variety	✓	✓	✓	✓	Grupo de Trabajo Software (G.T.S.)	Grupo de Trabajo Software (G.T.S.)
MSX Software Nº5	1986	Variety	✓	✓	✓	✓	Grupo de Trabajo Software (G.T.S.)	Grupo de Trabajo Software (G.T.S.)
MSX Software Nº6	1986	Variety	✓	✓	✓	✓	Grupo de Trabajo Software (G.T.S.)	Grupo de Trabajo Software (G.T.S.)
MSX Software Nº7	1986	Variety	✓	✓	✓	✓	Grupo de Trabajo Software (G.T.S.)	Grupo de Trabajo Software (G.T.S.)
MSX Software Nº8	1986	Variety	✓	✓	✓	✓	Grupo de Trabajo Software (G.T.S.)	Grupo de Trabajo Software (G.T.S.)
MSX Software Nº9	1986	Variety	✓	✓	✓	✓	Grupo de Trabajo Software (G.T.S.)	Grupo de Trabajo Software (G.T.S.)
MSX Software Nº10	1986	Variety	✓	✓	✓	✓	Grupo de Trabajo Software (G.T.S.)	Grupo de Trabajo Software (G.T.S.)
MSX Software Nº11	1986	Variety	✓	✓	✓	✓	Grupo de Trabajo Software (G.T.S.)	Grupo de Trabajo Software (G.T.S.)
MSX Software Nº12	1986	Variety	✓	✓	✓	✓	Grupo de Trabajo Software (G.T.S.)	Grupo de Trabajo Software (G.T.S.)
MSX TraiN (aka MSXトレイン)	1993	Adventure/Variety/Quiz	✗	✓	✓	✓	Family Soft	Family Soft
MSX TraiN 2 (aka MSXトレイン2)	1993	Adventure/Variety/Quiz	✗	✓	✓	✓	Family Soft	Family Soft
MSX-21 (aka MSX－21)	1983	Cards games	✓	✓	✓	✓	ASCII Corporation	ASCII Corporation
Multi-target Adventure All you want to do 2: Go for the Tourist!! (aka マルチターゲットアドベンチャーやりたい放題2 ツーリストを狙え!!)	1988	Adventure/Adult	✗	✓	✓	✓	Lucifer Soft	All Circulation
Multipuzzle	1985	Educational	✓	✓	✓	✓	Anaya Multimedia	Sony Spain
Mundial de Fútbol	1990	Sport games	✓	✓	✓	✓	Opera Soft	Opera Soft
The Munsters	1988	Action / Adventure	✓	✓	✓	✓	Alternative Software	Alternative Software
Murder on the Mississippi	1987		✗	✓	✓	✓	Activision	Jaleco
Mutan Zone	1991	Action	✓	✓	✓	✓	Opera Soft	Opera Soft
Mutant Monty	1986		✓	✓	✓	✓		Artic Computing
Mystery House (aka ミステリーハウス)	1987	Adventure	✗	✓	✓	✓	Microcabin	Microcabin
Mystery House II (aka ミステリーハウスII)	1987	Adventure	✗	✓	✓	✓	Microcabin	Microcabin
The Mystery of Hiranya	1986	Adventure / Text only	✓	✓	✓	✓	Login Soft	Pony Canyon
Mystery of the Mu Continent	1984	Adventure	✓	✓	✓	✓	Stratford Computer Center Corporation	Stratford Computer Center Corporation
Mystery of the Nile	1990	Adventure	✓	✓	✓	✓	Made In Spain	Made In Spain
Mystery: The Party (aka ミステリー・ザ・パーティー)	1985	Adventure	✓	✓	✓	✓	Sony	Sony
Mysterydisc: Many Roads to Murder	1984	Adventure	✓	✓	✓	✓	LaserDisc Corporation	LaserDisc Corporation
Mysterydisc: Murder, Anyone?	1984	Adventure	✓	✓	✓	✓	LaserDisc Corporation	LaserDisc Corporation
Mystical	1984	Action	✓	✓	✓	✓	Infogrames	Infogrames
Myth of Darkness - Legend of Yamato Takeru (aka 闇の神話 大和武尊伝説)	1986	Adventure	✓	✓	✓	✓	ZAP	Sony
Mythos	1990	Rpg	✓	✓	✓	✓	Opera Soft	Opera Soft
Nador	1985		✓	✓	✓	✓	Roland Toonen Software	German Soft
Nap Tetsyua's A-Class Mahjong (aka 居眠り流阿佐田哲也のA級麻雀)	1989	Board game - Mahjong	✗	✓	✓	✓	Pony Canyon	Pony Canyon
Narco Police	1990	Arcade	✓	✓	✓	✓	Dinamic	Dinamic
Nausicaä (aka '忘れじのナウシカ・ゲーム')	1984	Horizontal shooter	✓	✓	✓	✓	Technopolis Soft	Technopolis Soft
Navitune (aka ナビチューンドラゴン航海記)	1990	Rpg	✗	✓	✓	✓	Kogado Studio	Kogado Studio
Navy Moves	1988	Horizontal shooter	✓	✓	✓	✓	Dinamic	Dinamic
Nekketsu Judo (aka 熱血柔道)	1988	Sport games	✗	✓	✓	✓	Pony Canyon	Pony Canyon
Nemesis (aka Gradius, グラディウス)	1986	Horizontal shooter	✓	✓	✓	✓	Konami	Konami
Nemesis 2 (aka Gradius 2)	1987		✓	✓	✓	✓	Konami	Konami
Nemesis 3: The Eve of Destruction (aka Gopher's Ambition Episode II', ゴーファーの野望EPISODEII)	1988	Horizontal shooter	✓	✓	✓	✓	Konami	Konami
Nemphis	1989	Interactive fiction	✓	✓	✓	✓	Nemesis Informática	Nemesis Informática
Nero 2000	1985	Action	✓	✓	✓	✓	Bio-Syntax	Bio-Syntax
Nervous Kaiju Concentration	1983	Educational	✓	✓	✓	✓	Nihon Maikon Gakuin	Nihon Maikon Gakuin
New Adam & Eve (aka ニューアダム&イブ)	1986	Puzzle/Adult	✗	✓	✓	✓	Sony	Sony
New Games MSX 20	1989	Compilation	✓	✓	✓	✓	Edigamma	Edigamma
New Games MSX 23	1989	Compilation	✓	✓	✓	✓	Edigamma	Edigamma
New Horizon English Course 1 (aka ニューホライズン英語コース1)	1986	Educational	✓	✓	✓	✓	Tokyo Shoseki	Tokyo Shoseki
New Legendly Nine Gems (aka 九玉伝 新章)	1990	Action	✗	✓	✓	✓	Tecno Soft	Tecno Soft
New York Bomb y Carreras de Caballos	1986	Arcade	✓	✓	✓	✓	Spectravideo (SVI)	Spectravideo (SVI)
Nick Neaker (aka ニック・ニーケアー)	1984	Action	✓	✓	✓	✓	Colpax	Colpax
Night Flight (aka ナイトフライト)	1984	Simulation	✓	✓	✓	✓	Tomy Company Ltd.	Tomy Company Ltd.
Nightshade	1986		✓	✓	✓	✓		Nippon Dexter
NIKE (aka ナイキ)	1991	Visual Novel	✗	✓	✓	✓	Cocktail Soft	Cocktail Soft
Nikonikopun Container Quiz (aka にこにこぷんコンテナクイズ)	1984	Quiz	✓	✓	✓	✓	R&D Computer Co. Ltd	R&D Computer Co. Ltd
Nikonikopun: Can You Go? (aka にこにこぷんいけるかな)	1984	Adventure	✓	✓	✓	✓	NHK Gakuen	R&D Computer Co. Ltd
Nikonikopun: Maze Date (aka にこにこぷんメイロデート)	1984	Maze	✓	✓	✓	✓	R&D Computer Co. Ltd	R&D Computer Co. Ltd
Nikonikopun: Scattered Puzzle (aka にこにこぷんバラバラパズル)	1984	Puzzle	✓	✓	✓	✓	R&D Computer Co. Ltd	R&D Computer Co. Ltd
Nikonikopun: Shopkeeper (aka にこにこぷんおみせやさん)	1984	Simulation	✓	✓	✓	✓	NHK Gakuen	R&D Computer Co. Ltd
Niko^{2} - Niko Niko - (aka NIKO2～ニコニコ～)	1991	Action	✗	✓	✓	✓	Wolf Team	Wolf Team
Nine Princes in Amber	1986	Adventure	✗	✓	✓	✓	Telarium	Philips Spain
Ninja (aka 忍者)	1988	Action	✗	✓	✓	✓	ZAP / Bothtec	Bothtec
Ninja JaJaMaru-kun	1986	Action-platformer	✓	✓	✓	✓	Nippon Dexter	Jaleco
Ninja-Kid	1987	Action-platformer	✓	✓	✓	✓	Jaleco	Nippon Dexter
Ninja-Kid II	1987	Action-platformer	✓	✓	✓	✓	Opera House	HAL Laboratory
Ninja Princess (aka 忍者プリンセス)	1986	Action	✓	✓	✓	✓	Sega	Sega
Ninjya Kage (aka 忍者・影)	1984	Action - Timing	✓	✓	✓	✓	Hudson Soft	Hudson Soft
Nirensei Part 2 (aka 二連声パート2)	1986	Adult	✗	✓	✓	✓	Mighty Micom System	Mighty Micom System
Nirensei Part 3: Pro no Go (aka 二連声パート3 プロのGO)	1987	Adult	✗	✓	✓	✓	Mighty Micom System	Mighty Micom System
Nirensei Part 4: Hisshou Okigo Tora no Maki (aka 二連声パート4 必勝おき碁虎の巻)	1987	Adult	✗	✓	✓	✓	Mighty Micom System	Mighty Micom System
Nobunaga's Ambition (aka 信長の野望)	1985	Strategy	✓	✓	✓	✓	KOEI	KOEI
Nobunaga's Ambition (MSX2) (aka 信長の野望)	1986	Strategy	✗	✓	✓	✓	KOEI	KOEI
Nobunaga's Ambition 2 - Nationwide Edition (aka 信長の野望・全国版)	1988	Strategy	✓	✓	✓	✓	KOEI	KOEI
Nobunaga's Ambition 2 - Nationwide Edition (MSX2) (aka 信長の野望・全国版)	1988	Strategy	✗	✓	✓	✓	KOEI	KOEI
Nobunaga's Ambition 4: Rising Sun (aka 信長の野望・武将風雲録)	1991	Strategy	✗	✓	✓	✓	KOEI	KOEI
Nobunaga's Ambition: Tales of the Sengoku Warlords (aka 信長の野望・戦国群雄伝)	1990	Strategy	✗	✓	✓	✓	KOEI	KOEI
Nonamed	1990	Action	✓	✓	✓	✓	Dinamic	Dinamic
Noria de Números	1985	Educational	✓	✓	✓	✓	Anaya Multimedia	Sony Spain
Norseman	1984		✓	✓	✓	✓	Electric Software	Electric Software
North & South (aka ノース&サウス わくわく南北戦争)	1991	Action/Strategy/Platform	✓	✓	✓	✓	Infogrames	Erbe Software
North Sea Bullion Adventure	1985	Text and Gfx	✓	✓	✓	✓	AA Software	Kuma Computers
North Sea Helicopter	1985		✓	✓	✓	✓	Aacksoft	Eaglesoft
Nuclear Bowls	1986	Arcade	✓	✓	✓	✓	Diabolic	Zigurat
Number Painter	1985	Platform	✓	✓	✓	✓	A.S.K.	A.S.K.
Nuts & Milk (aka NUTS&MILK)	1984	Puzzle	✓	✓	✓	✓	Hudson Soft	SoftBank
Nyancle Racing	1988		✗	✓	✓	✓	Bit^{2}	Panasoft
Nyanpi & Sum Collection	1990		✗	✓	✓	✓	Compile	Compile
O Conde de Monte Cristo	1988	Adventure/Text and Gfx	✓	✓	✓	✓	C. Fabiano	C. Fabiano
O'Mac Farmer (aka ファーマー)	1984	Action	✓	✓	✓	✓	Mass Tael	ASCII Corporation
O'thelo	1984	Board game	✓	✓	✓	✓	DIMensionNEW	Canon
Oberon 69	1990		✓	✓	✓	✓	Diabolic	G.LL. Software
Obliterator	1989	Action	✓	✓	✓	✓	Melbourne House / New Frontier	Dro Soft
Ocean Conqueror	1987	Simulation	✓	✓	✓	✓	Rack It (Hewson)	Rack It (Hewson)
Oceanus - God of the Ocean (aka 大洋の神・オケアノス)	1983	Action/Arcade	✓	✓	✓	✓	Nihon Maikon Gakuin	Nihon Maikon Gakuin
Octagon Squad	1986	Adventure	✓	✓	✓	✓	Mastertronic	Mastertronic
Octopuss	1985	Unknown	✓	✓	✓	✓	Vifi International	Vifi International
Offering (aka オファリング)	1984	Adventure	✓	✓	✓	✓	AI Inc.	Toshiba-EMI Ltd.
OGRE (aka オーガ)	1987	Strategy	✓	✓	✓	✓	Origin Systems	System Soft
Oh Mummy!	1984	Action	✓	✓	✓	✓	Longman	Topsoft
Oh No!	1985	Action	✓	✓	✓	✓	The Bytebusters	Eaglesoft
Oh Shit!	1985	Arcade	✓	✓	✓	✓	Aackosoft	Aackosoft
Oil's Well (aka オイルズ・ウェル)	1984	Action	✓	✓	✓	✓	Sierra On Line	Comptiq
Ole!	1986		✓	✓	✓	✓	Jawx	Bug-Byte Software
Omega Dimension	1989	Action	✓	✓	✓	✓	Positive	Positive
Omega, Planète Invisible	1984	Text and Gfx	✓	✓	✓	✓	Infogrames	Infogrames
Onry Senki (aka 怨霊戦記)	1989	Adventure/Adult	✗	✓	✓	✓	Soft Studio WING	Soft Studio WING
Operation Europe: Path to Victory 1939-45	1992	Strategy	✗	✓	✓	✓	KOEI	KOEI
Operation Grenade	1989	Strategy	✓	✓	✓	✓	TSR, Inc.	TSR, Inc.
Operation Wolf	1989	Action	✓	✓	✓	✓	Ocean Software	Ocean Software
Orange Rose (aka オレンジローズ)	1993	Adventure/Adult	✗	✓	✓	✓	System House OH	System House OH
Ormuz	1986	Text and Gfx	✓	✓	✓	✓	Genesis Soft	Genesis Soft
Orthocrack	1986	Educational	✓	✓	✓	✓	Sermap Paris	Sermap Paris
Ostrich (aka オストリッチ)	1984	Action	✓	✓	✓	✓	Colpax	Colpax
Othello (aka オセロ)	1985	Board games	✓	✓	✓	✓	Pony Canyon	Pony Canyon
Otto e Trenta	1984		✓	✓	✓	✓	Melchioni Informatica	Melchioni Informatica
OutRun	1988	Racing	✓	✓	✓	✓	SEGA	U.S. Gold
OutRun (MSX2)	1988	Racing	✗	✓	✓	✓	SEGA	U.S. Gold
Outlaw Suikoden (aka アウトロー水滸伝)	1990	Adventure	✗	✓	✓	✓	Micronet Co., Ltd.	Micronet Co., Ltd.
Outroyd	1984	Action	✓	✓	✓	✓	Stratford Computer Center Corporation	Stratford Computer Center Corporation
Pachicom (aka パチコン)	1985	Casino games - Pachinko	✓	✓	✓	✓	J.P.M.	Toshiba-EMI
Pachinko U.F.O. (aka パチンコUFO)	1984	Casino games - Pachinko	✓	✓	✓	✓	Casio	Casio
Pachipro Densetsu (aka パチプロ伝説)	1989	Board games	✗	✓	✓	✓	CBS/SONY	HAL Laboratory
Pacific Theater of Operations (P.T.O.) (aka 提督の決断)	1991	Simulation	✗	✓	✓	✓	KOEI	KOEI
Pac-Land	1988	Platform-adventure	✓	✓	✓	✓	Namco	Grandslam Entertainment
Pac-Man	1984	Maze - Pac-Man	✓	✓	✓	✓	Namco	Bug-Byte Software
Pac-Mania	1988		✓	✓	✓	✓	Namco	Grandslam Entertainment
Pac-Mania (MSX2)	1989		✗	✓	✓	✓	Namco	Grandslam Entertainment
Pai Panic (aka パイパニック)	1983	Action	✓	✓	✓	✓	ASCII Corporation	ASCII Corporation
Pairs (aka ペアーズ)	1983	Action/Puzzle	✓	✓	✓	✓	ASCII Corporation	ASCII Corporation
Palace of Death	1989		✓	✓	✓	✓	The Falcon	Timesoft
Palamedes	1990		✗	✓	✓	✓		HOT - B
Panel Panic	1987	Puzzle	✓	✓	✓	✓	The Bytebusters	The Bytebusters
Panic Kong	1985	Action	✓	✓	✓	✓	Soft Game	Soft Game
Panic the Train (aka パニック・ザ・トレイン)	1984	Action	✓	✓	✓	✓	Central Education	Central Education
Panique	1986	Action	✓	✓	✓	✓	The Bytebusters	The Bytebusters
Panther	1986		✓	✓	✓	✓	Irem	Irem
Panzer Attack	1986	Strategy	✓	✓	✓	✓	MC Lothlorien	MC Lothlorien
Paris-Dakar	1988		✓	✓	✓	✓	Made in Spain	Zigurat
Parodius	1988		✓	✓	✓	✓	Konami	Konami
Paragon: Sex a Doll (aka パラゴン SEX A DOLL)	1991	Visual Novel/Adult	✗	✓	✓	✓	Heart Soft	Heart Soft
Party Game Hopper (aka パーティゲームホッパー)	1989		✗	✓	✓	✓	Champion Soft	Champion Soft
Pass Ball (aka パスボール)	1983	Sport games	✓	✓	✓	✓	ASCII Corporation	ASCII Corporation
Passengers on the Wind	1988	Adventure	✓	✓	✓	✓	Infogrames	Infogrames
Passing Shot	1988	Sport games	✓	✓	✓	✓	Sega	Sega
Pasteman Pat	1984	Action	✓	✓	✓	✓	Silverbird	Silverbird
Pastfinder (aka パストファインダー, Galax)	1984		✓	✓	✓	✓	Activision	Activision
Patrol Officer!! (aka おまわりさん！！)	1984	Action/Adventure	✓	✓	✓	✓	Central education	Central education
Patrullera XH-63	1987	Arcade	✓	✓	✓	✓	Genesis Soft, A.G.D.	Grupo de Trabajo Software (G.T.S.)
Payload (aka 頑張れトラックボーイペイロード)	1985	Action	✓	✓	✓	✓	ZAP	Sony
Peacock King (aka 孔雀王)	1988	Adventure	✓	✓	✓	✓	Pony Canyon	Pony Canyon
Peetan (aka ピータン)	1984	Action	✓	✓	✓	✓	Nippon Columbia	Colpax
Pegasus (aka ペガサス)	1986	Action	✓	✓	✓	✓	Cross Media Soft	Cross Media Soft
Pelmanism	1984	Cards games	✓	✓	✓	✓	A. J. Pack	Kuma Computers
Pelota Vasca	1986	Sport games	✓	✓	✓	✓	Manhattan Transfer	MSX Club (ES)
Penguin	1988	Arcade	✓	✓	✓	✓	Eurosoft	Premium III Software Distribution
Penguin Adventure	1986		✓	✓	✓	✓	Konami	Konami
Penguin Date (aka ペンギンデート)	1984	Action	✓	✓	✓	✓	Marufune F.S.L	Marufune F.S.L
Penguin Kun Wars (aka Animal Wars, ぺんぎんくんウォーズ)	1985	Sports - Fictional	✓	✓	✓	✓	ASCII Corporation	ASCII Corporation
Penguin Kun Wars II (aka Penguin Wars II, ぺんぎんくんウォーズ2)	1988	Sports - Fictional	✗	✓	✓	✓	ASCII Corporation	ASCII Corporation
Pennant Race II (aka 激突ペナントレース2)	1989	Sports - Baseball	✗	✓	✓	✓	Konami	Konami
Pension Story: Flower Kiyosato (aka ペンションストーリー 花の清里)	1988	Visual Novel	✗	✓	✓	✓	Panther Software	Panther Software
Penta's Big Adventure (aka ペンタの大冒険)	1984	Adventure	✓	✓	✓	✓	Central education	Central education
Pentagram	1986	Isometric platformer	✓	✓	✓	✓		Ultimate Play the Game
Pepe Saltarín	1986	Action	✓	✓	✓	✓	P.P.P. Ediciones	Genesis Soft, A.G.D.
Perfect Sokoban (aka 倉庫番パーフェクト)	1989	Puzzle	✗	✓	✓	✓	Microcabin	Microcabin
Perico Delgado Maillot Amarillo	1989	Sport games	✓	✓	✓	✓	Topo Soft	Erbe Software
Perry Mason: The Case of the Mandarin Murder	1986	Adventure	✗	✓	✓	✓	Philips Spain	Philips Spain
Perspective (aka パースペクティブ)	1987	Vertical shooter	✓	✓	✓	✓	Login Soft	Login Soft
Peter Beardsley's International Football	1988	Sport games/Simulation	✓	✓	✓	✓	Bug-Byte Software	Bug-Byte Software
Phantasie - Gelnor's Chapter (aka ファンタジージェルノアの章)	1988	Rpg	✗	✓	✓	✓	SSI	Bothtec
Phantasie II - Story of Ferronrah (aka ファンタジーIIフェロンラの章)	1988	Rpg	✗	✓	✓	✓	SSI	Bothtec
Phantasie III - The Wrath of Nikademus (aka ファンタジーIIIニカデモスの怒り)	1989	Rpg	✗	✓	✓	✓	SSI	Bothtec
Phantasie IV - The Birth of Heroes (aka ファンタジーIV英雄の血脈)	1991	Point and Click	✗	✓	✓	✓	SSI	Starcraft
Pharaoh's Revenge	1988	Action	✓	✓	✓	✓	MCM Software	Eurosoft
Phase Moon	1986	Arcade	✓	✓	✓	✓	GEASA	GEASA
Photo Club Part III: Mansion of Fear (aka 美少女写真館パートIII恐怖の館編)	1988	Visual Novel	✗	✓	✓	✓	HARD	HARD
Photo Club: Out Side Story (aka 美少女写真館番外編アウトサイドストーリー)	1990	Visual Novel	✗	✓	✓	✓	HARD	HARD
Physical Magical RPG Mai * Mai: I'll Make You Say Funifuni Papyuun! (aka フィジカル・マジカル・RPG 舞☆MAI ふにふにぱぴゅーんといわせちゃる！)	1991	Rpg, Adult	✗	✓	✓	✓	Fairytale	Fairytale
PIAS - Torn Sexual Spring - (aka ピアス ～引き裂かれた性春～)	1991	Visual Novel/Adult	✗	✓	✓	✓	Birdy Soft	Birdy Soft
Pico Pico (aka ピコピコ)	1983	Puzzle	✓	✓	✓	✓	Microcabin	Microcabin
Picture Puzzle (aka ピクチャーパズル)	1983	Puzzle	✓	✓	✓	✓	HAL Laboratory	HAL Laboratory
Pinball Blaster	1988	Pinball	✓	✓	✓	✓	Premium III Software Distribution	Eurosoft
Pinball Maker (aka ピンボールメーカー)	1985	Pinball	✓	✓	✓	✓	Colpax	Nippon Columbia
Pineapplin (aka パイナップリン)	1984	Action	✓	✓	✓	✓	ZAP	ZAP
Pink Panther	1988	Action	✓	✓	✓	✓	Dro Soft	Magic Bytes
Pinky Chase (aka ピンキーチェイス)	1984	Action	✓	✓	✓	✓	Colpax	Nippon Columbia
Pinky Ponky 1: Beautiful Dream (aka ぴんきぃ・ぽんきぃ第1集 びゅーてぃふる・どりーむ)	1989	Dating Simulation	✗	✓	✓	✓	Elf Co.	Elf Co.
Pinky Ponky 2: Twilight Games (aka ぴんきぃ・ぽんきぃ第2集 とわいらいと・げーむす)	1989	Dating Simulation	✗	✓	✓	✓	Elf Co.	Elf Co.
Pinky Ponky 3: Battle Lovers (aka ぴんきぃ・ぽんきぃ第3集 ばとる・らヴぁーず)	1989	Dating Simulation	✗	✓	✓	✓	Elf Co.	Elf Co.
Piper (aka パイパー)	1985	Action	✓	✓	✓	✓	Heart Soft	Telenet Japan
Pipi (aka ピピ)	1985	Action/Maze	✓	✓	✓	✓	Nippon Dexter	UPL
Pillbox (aka カラー・トーチカ)	1983	Fixed shooter	✓	✓	✓	✓	Magicsoft	National
Pippols	1985		✓	✓	✓	✓		Konami
Pirates (aka Piratas)	1988	Action	✓	✓	✓	✓	Halley Software	Halley Software
Piso Zero	1991	Arcade	✓	✓	✓	✓	Zigurat	Zigurat
Pistoletov at the Factory - Episode 2 (aka Пистолетов на заводе (Вторая серия))	1988	Platform	✓	✓	✓	✓	A.R. Crazysoft	A.R. Crazysoft
Pitfall!	1984		✓	✓	✓	✓		Activision
Pitfall II: Lost Caverns			✓	✓	✓	✓		Activision
Play Mate (aka プレイメイト)	1987	Text and Gfx	✗	✓	✓	✓	Omega system	Omega system
Play The Golf With Me (aka 私をゴルフに連れてって)	1991	Text and Gfx	✗	✓	✓	✓	Fairytale/Apros Selon	Fairytale
Playball (aka プレイボール)	1986	Sport games	✓	✓	✓	✓	Sony	Sony
Playball III (aka プレイボールIII)	1989	Sport games	✗	✓	✓	✓	Sony	Sony
The Players Club	1985	Sport games	✓	✓	✓	✓	Victor Co. of Japan (JVC)	Victor Co. of Japan (JVC)
Playhouse Strippoker	1988	Cards games	✓	✓	✓	✓	Premium III Software Distribution/System 4	Eurosoft
Playhouse Strippoker (MSX2)	1989	Cards games	✗	✓	✓	✓	Premium III Software Distribution/System 4	Eurosoft
Pocky (aka ポッキー)	1989	Text and Gfx	✗	✓	✓	✓	Pony Tail Soft	Pony Tail Soft
Pocky 2 (aka ポッキー2)	1991	Text and Gfx	✗	✓	✓	✓	Pony Tail Soft	Pony Tail Soft
Point X Occupation Strategy (aka ポイントX占領作戦)	1986	Simulation/Strategy/Wargame	✓	✓	✓	✓	Victor Co. of Japan (JVC)	Victor Co. of Japan (JVC)
Poker Real		Cards games	✓	✓	✓	✓	Sysout	Sysout
Polar Star (aka ポーラースター)	1984	Shoot-'em-up	✓	✓	✓	✓	Microcabin	Microcabin
Poli Díaz (aka Boxeo, Poli)	1990	Sport games	✓	✓	✓	✓	Opera Soft	Opera Soft
Police Academy	1986	Action	✓	✓	✓	✓	Eaglesoft	Eaglesoft
Police Academy II	1987	First-person shooter	✓	✓	✓	✓	Methodic Solutions	Methodic Solutions
Police Dog (aka ポリスドッグ)	1984	Action	✓	✓	✓	✓	SoftBank	Hudson Soft
The Police Story	1985	Action / Adventure	✓	✓	✓	✓	Pony Canyon	Pony Canyon
Policia y Ladron	1985	Pinball	✓	✓	✓	✓	Club Sony MSX	Club Sony MSX
Poogaboo: La Pulga 2	1991	Sport games	✓	✓	✓	✓	Opera Soft	Opera Soft
Pooyan			✓	✓	✓	✓		Hudson Soft
Pop Lemon (aka ポップレモン)	1989	Text and Gfx	✗	✓	✓	✓	Champion Soft	Champion Soft
Poppaq The Fish (aka ポパック・ザ・フィッシュ)	1984	Action	✓	✓	✓	✓	Mass Tael	ASCII Corporation
Portopia Serial Murder Case (aka ポートピア連続殺人事件)	1985	Text and Gfx	✓	✓	✓	✓	ENIX	ENIX
Post Mortem	1988	Adventure	✓	✓	✓	✓	Genesis Soft	MCM Software
Power Drift	1989	Racing	✓	✓	✓	✓	SEGA	MCM Software
Power Fail (aka パワーフェイル)	1984	Action	✓	✓	✓	✓	Hudson Soft	SoftBank
Power Magic	1990	Arcade	✓	✓	✓	✓	Gamesoft	Zigurat
Predator	1988		✓	✓	✓	✓		Pack-In-Video
Pretty girl likes checking (aka 美少女はチェックがお好き)	1988	Visual Novel	✗	✓	✓	✓	Bond Soft	Bond Soft
Pretty Sheep (aka Hitsuji Yai, ひつじやー	1983	Action	✓	✓	✓	✓	Hudson Soft	Hudson Soft/Toshiba
The Price of Magik	1986	Interactive fiction	✓	✓	✓	✓	Level 9 Computing	Level 9 Computing
Princess is a Street Girl? (aka プリンセスはストリートガール？)	1990	Date Simulation	✗	✓	✓	✓	Lucifer Soft	All Circulation
Princess Maker (aka ""プリンセスメーカー"")	1992	Childcare Simulation	✗	✓	✓	✓	Gainax	Micro Cabin
Princess Tomato in the Salad Kingdom (aka サラダの国のトマト姫)	1985	Adventure	✓	✓	✓	✓	Hudson Soft	Hudson Soft
Private School (aka プライベートスクール)	1989	Visual Novel	✗	✓	✓	✓	Elf Co.	Elf Co.
Procenten	1985	Educational	✓	✓	✓	✓	Aschcom	Filosoft
Professional Baseball (aka プロフェッショナルベースボール)	1986	Sport games	✓	✓	✓	✓	Technopolis Soft	Technopolis Soft
The Professional Baseball Crash Pennant Race	1988	Sport games	✓	✓	✓	✓	Konami	Konami
Professional Baseball Fan Telenet Stadium (aka プロ野球ファンテレネットスタジアム)	1987	Sport games	✗	✓	✓	✓	Telenet Japan	Telenet Japan
Professional Baseball Super Simulation (aka プロ野球スーパーシミュレーション)	1984	Sport games	✓	✓	✓	✓	JDS	JDS
Professional Go Part 3 (aka プロの碁パート3)	1990	Board games	✗	✓	✓	✓	Mighty Micom System	Mighty Micom System
Professional Mah-Jong (aka プロフェッショナル麻雀)	1985	Board games	✗	✓	✓	✓	Chatnoir	ASCII Corporation
Professional Mah-Jong Gokuh (aka プロフェッショナル麻雀悟空)	1988	Board games	✗	✓	✓	✓	Chatnoir	ASCII Corporation
Professional Snooker Simulator (aka Tournament Snooker)	1986	Sport games	✓	✓	✓	✓	HARD Software	Codemasters
Professional Tennis Simulator (aka Simulador Profesional de Tenis)	1990	Sport games	✓	✓	✓	✓	Alucine Soft	Dinamic
Project A2 (aka プロジェクトA2史上最大の標的)	1987	Rpg	✗	✓	✓	✓	Pony Canyon	Pony Canyon
Projectiles (aka المقذوفات)	1985	Action/Educational	✓	✓	✓	✓	Al Alamiah	Al Alamiah
The Protector	1985	Action / Shoot-'em-up	✓	✓	✓	✓	Pony Canyon	Pony Canyon
Psychic War: Cosmic Soldier 2	1988	RPG	✓	✓	✓	✓		Kogado Studio
Psychic War: Cosmic Soldier 2 (MSX2)	1988	RPG	✗	✓	✓	✓		Kogado Studio
Psycho Pig U.X.B (aka ぶたさん)	1988	Arcade	✓	✓	✓	✓	Jaleco/US Gold	US Gold
Psycho World	1988	Action	✗	✓	✓	✓		Hertz
Psy-O-Blade	1988	Action	✗	✓	✓	✓		T&E Soft
Punchy	1984	Action	✓	✓	✓	✓	Mr. Micro	Mr. Micro
Puyo Puyo	1991		✗	✓	✓	✓	Compile	Compile
Puzzle (aka الأحاجي)	1987	Puzzle	✓	✓	✓	✓	Al Alamiah	Al Alamiah
Puzzle Flugzeug-Klassiker	1986	Puzzle	✗	✓	✓	✓	Data Beutner	Philips Germany
Puzzle Panic (aka パズルパニック)	1986	Puzzle	✓	✓	✓	✓	Epyx	System Soft
Puzzle Reise durch Deutschland		Puzzle	✗	✓	✓	✓	Data Beutner	Philips Germany
Puzzle Reise um die Welt	1986	Puzzle	✗	✓	✓	✓	Data Beutner/Andy Voss	Philips Germany
Puzzle Schiffbau-Klassiker	1986	Puzzle	✗	✓	✓	✓	Data Beutner	Philips Germany
Puzzle Unsere Tierwelt		Puzzle	✗	✓	✓	✓	Data Beutner	Philips Germany
The Pyramid	1983	Adventure / Text only	✓	✓	✓	✓	Central Education	Central Education
Pyramid Warp (aka ピラミッド・ワープ)	1983	Adventure	✓	✓	✓	✓	T&ESOFT	T&ESOFT
Pyro-Man (aka ピロマン)	1985	Action/Platform	✓	✓	✓	✓	Nice Ideas	Nice Ideas
Q*bert	1986	Action - Q*bert	✓	✓	✓	✓		Konami
Quarth	1990		✗	✓	✓	✓	Konami	Konami
Quasar	1987	Shoot-'em-up	✓	✓	✓	✓	Tynesoft	Micro Value
Quastel - 1st Comic Art Game	1986	Adventure	✓	✓	✓	✓	Roland Toonen Software	German Soft
Quebert	1987	Arcade	✓	✓	✓	✓	Eurosoft	Eurosoft
Queen's Golf (aka クイーンズゴルフ)	1984	Sport games	✓	✓	✓	✓	ASCII Corporation	ASCII Corporation
Queen's Golf Joy Pack (aka クイーンズゴルフ ジョイパック)	1984	Sport games	✓	✓	✓	✓	ASCII Corporation	ASCII Corporation
Quinpl			✗	✗	✓	✓		Bit^{2}
R-Type	1988		✓	✓	✓	✓	Irem	Irem
Raccoon Dog (aka ばってんタヌキの大冒険)	1986	Jump and run	✓	✓	✓	✓	Tecno Soft	Tecno Soft
Rabbian (aka ラビアンのアルバイト)	1985	Action	✓	✓	✓	✓	Soft Pro International	Soft Pro International
The Race	1987	Racing	✓	✓	✓	✓	Players	Players
RAD-X 8	1987	Action	✗	✓	✓	✓	Radarsoft	Philips
Raid on Bungeling Bay (aka バンゲリングベイ)	1984	Shoot-'em-up	✓	✓	✓	✓	Broderbund Software	Sony
Rally-X	1984		✓	✓	✓	✓	Namco	Namco
RAM (aka R.A.M.)	1990	Arcade	✓	✓	✓	✓	Topo Soft	Erbe Software
Rambo (Visiogame)	1986	Action	✓	✓	✓	✓	Visiogame	Visiogame
Rambo (Pack-In_Video) (aka ランボー)	1985	Rpg	✓	✓	✓	✓	CCS	Pack-In-Video
Rambo III (aka Rambo 3)	1988	Action	✓	✓	✓	✓	Ocean Software	Ocean Software
The Rampart	1988	Arcade/Break-out	✓	✓	✓	✓	Genesis Soft	Iber Soft
Rana Sideral / Gusanoco	1985	Variety	✓	✓	✓	✓	Monser	Monser
Rance - Quest for Hikari - (aka ランス光をもとめて)	1989	Rpg/Adult	✗	✓	✓	✓	Alice Soft	Alice Soft
Rance II - The Rebellious Maidens - (aka ランスII反逆の少女達)	1991	Rpg/Adult	✗	✓	✓	✓	Alice Soft	Alice Soft
Randar no Bouken	1988		✓	✓	✓	✓	Compile	Kemsx
Randar II: Revenge of Death	1989		✗	✓	✓	✓	Compile	Compile
Randar no Bouken III: Yami ni Miserareta Majutsushi (aka The Adventure of Randar III)	1990		✗	✓	✓	✓	Compile	Compile
Random Zone (aka ランダム・ゾーン)	1983	Shoot-'em-up	✓	✓	✓	✓	Nihon Maikon Gakuin	Nihon Maikon Gakuin
Ranma: Hiryu densetsu	1992	Adventure	✗	✗	✗	✓	Bothtec	Bothtec
Rastan Saga	1988		✗	✓	✓	✓	Taito	Taito
RasterScan	1987	Arcade	✓	✓	✓	✓	Binary Design, Ltd	Mastertronic
Rath-tha - Fase II	1989	Arcade	✓	✓	✓	✓	Positive	Positive
Ray Gun (aka RAY・GUN)	1991	Rpg/Adult	✗	✓	✓	✓	Elf Co.	Elf Co.
Real Tennis (aka リアルテニス)	1983	Sport games	✓	✓	✓	✓	Takara	Takara
Record of Lodoss War (aka ロードス島戦記)	1989	Rpg	✗	✓	✓	✓	Humming Bird Soft	Humming Bird Soft
Record of Lodoss War: Fukujinzuke (aka ロードス島戦記福神漬)	1990	Puzzle/Variety/Rpg	✗	✓	✓	✓	Humming Bird Soft	Humming Bird Soft
Red Lights of Amsterdam	1986	Cards games	✗	✓	✓	✓	The Bytebusters	Eaglesoft
Red Moon	1985	Interactive fiction	✓	✓	✓	✓	Level 9 Computing	Level 9 Computing
Red Zone (aka レッドゾーン)	1985	Shoot-'em-up	✓	✓	✓	✓	Yellow Horn	ASCII Corporation
Reflex	1987	Break-out	✓	✓	✓	✓	Players	Players
Reflexión de la luz. Espejos planos	1986	Educational	✓	✓	✓	✓	Patagoras	Philips Spain
Régate - La Coupe de L'America	1986	Simulator - Sailing	✓	✓	✓	✓	Philips France	Philips France
Rekenwonder	1986	Educational	✗	✓	✓	✓	Radarsoft	Philips
Rekishi Emaki Adult Adventure Series #1 - Irowanioedo -	1988	Visual Novel/Adult	✗	✓	✓	✓	Studio ANGEL	All Circulation
Rekishi Emaki Adult Adventure Series #2 - Gorakuin -	1989	Visual Novel/Adult	✗	✓	✓	✓	Studio ANGEL	All Circulation
Rekishi Emaki Adult Adventure Series #3 - Nukata no Okimi -	1989	Visual Novel/Adult	✗	✓	✓	✓	Studio ANGEL	All Circulation
Relics (aka レリクス)	1986		✓	✓	✓	✓	Bothtec	Bothtec
Relics (aka レリクス) (MSX2)	1986		✗	✓	✓	✓	Bothtec	Bothtec
Rendezvous with Rama	1986	Text only	✗	✓	✓	✓	Telarium	Philips France
Renegade III - The Final Chapter	1989	Arcade	✓	✓	✓	✓	Imagine	Erbe Software
Renju & Ojama Dogs (aka 連珠)	1985	Board games	✓	✓	✓	✓	Pony Canyon	Pony Canyon
Replicart	1987	Puzzle/Arcade/Snake/nibbles	✗	✓	✓	✓	KLON	Sony
Rescate Atlántida	1989		✓	✓	✓	✓	Dinamic	Dinamic
Rescate en el Golfo	1990		✓	✓	✓	✓	True Software	Opera Soft
Resurrection of the Demon Realm	1987	Adventure	✗	✓	✓	✓	Soft Studio WING	Apros Selon
Return of Detective Team X	1990	Adventure	✗	✓	✓	✓	Heart Soft	Heart Soft
The Return of Ishtar	1988		✓	✓	✓	✓	Namco	Namco
Return of Jelda	1987	Shoot-'em-up	✗	✓	✓	✓	Softmen	Carry Lab
Return to Earth - version Star Track (aka Возвращение на Землю — версия игры Star Track)	1988	Vehicle simulation - Spacecraft	✓	✓	✓	✓	A.R. Crazysoft	A.R. Crazysoft
Return to Eden	1984	Interactive fiction	✓	✓	✓	✓	Level 9 Computing	Level 9 Computing
Reviver (aka リヴァイヴァー)	1987	Action/Rpg	✗	✓	✓	✓	Arsys	Arsys
Rex Hard	1988	Arcade	✓	✓	✓	✓	Mister Chip	Erbe Software
Rick the Jumping Martian	1986	Platform	✓	✓	✓	✓	Edisoft	Visiogame
Rigoberto el Cazador	1985	Arcade	✓	✓	✓	✓	Edisoft	Edisoft
Rise Out (aka ライズアウト)	1984	Shoot-'em-up	✓	✓	✓	✓	ASCII Corporation	ASCII Corporation
Risky Holding	1990	Strategy	✓	✓	✓	✓	Dimensionnew	Dimensionnew
River Chase (aka リバーチェイス)	1984	Racing	✓	✓	✓	✓	Soft Pro International	Soft Pro International
River Raid	1984	Action	✓	✓	✓	✓	Activision	Activision
Road Blaster (aka ロードブラスター)	1986	Dexterity	✓	✓	✓	✓	Data East	Victor Co. of Japan (JVC)
Road Fighter	1985		✓	✓	✓	✓	Konami	Konami
Road Wars	1988	Arcade	✓	✓	✓	✓	Arcadia Systems	Dro Soft
Robber	1986	Adventure	✓	✓	✓	✓	Grupo de Trabajo Software (G.T.S.)	Sygran, S.A.
Robo Crush	1990	Vehicle simulation - mech/RPG	✗	✓	✓	✗	SystemSoft	SystemSoft
Robo Wres 2001 (aka ロボ・レス・2001年)	1987	Action	✓	✓	✓	✓	Micronet Co., Ltd.	Micronet Co., Ltd.
Robocop	1988	Action	✓	✓	✓	✓	Ocean Software	Ocean Software
Robofrog	1985	Platform	✓	✓	✓	✓	Mass Tael	Spectravideo (SVI)
Robot Wars	1986	Shoot-'em-up	✓	✓	✓	✓	The Bytebusters	Eaglesoft
Roboy	1987	Horizontal	✓	✓	✓	✓	Double Brain!	Methodic Solutions
Rock'n Roller	1988	Action	✓	✓	✓	✓	Topo Soft	Topo Soft
Rocket Roger (aka ロケット・ロジャー)	1986	Action	✓	✓	✓	✓	Alligata	Alligata
Rockn' Bolt (aka ロックンボルト)	1985	Action	✓	✓	✓	✓	Activision	Pony Canyon
Rocky	1986	Action	✓	✓	✓	✓	Dinamic	Dinamic
Roger Rubbish	1985	Platform	✓	✓	✓	✓	Spectravideo (SVI)	Spectravideo (SVI)
Rogue Alliance (aka ローグアライアンス)	1989	Rpg	✗	✓	✓	✓	SSI	Starcraft
Roller	1987	Platform	✓	✓	✓	✓	Boss Company	Triosoft
Rollerball	1984		✓	✓	✓	✓	HAL Laboratory	HAL Laboratory
Rolling Blaster (aka ローリングブラスター)	1985	Shoot-'em-up	✓	✓	✓	✓	Laserdisc Corporation	Laserdisc Corporation
Roma - La conquista del imperio	1986	Strategy	✓	✓	✓	✓	Idealogic	Idealogic
Romance of the Three Kingdoms	1986	Strategy	✓	✓	✓	✓	KOEI	KOEI
Romance of the Three Kingdoms (MSX2)	1987	Strategy	✗	✓	✓	✓	KOEI	KOEI
Romance of the Three Kingdoms II (aka 三國志II)	1991	Strategy	✗	✓	✓	✓	Koei	Koei
Rompe Ladrillos	1985	Break-out	✓	✓	✓	✓	Indescomp	Indescomp
Rona: Judgement of the Mother Goddess (aka ローナ～女神の審判～)	1994	Rpg/Adult	✗	✓	✓	✓	Dixie	Dixie/May-Be Soft
Rotors (aka ローターズ)	1984	Shoot-'em-up	✓	✓	✓	✓	ASCII Corporation	ASCII Corporation
Rouge - The Lipstick of Midsummer - (aka ルージュ ～真夏の口紅～)	1990	Visual Novel/Adult	✗	✓	✓	✓	Birdy Soft	Birdy Soft
Roulette		Cards games	✓	✓	✓	✓	Spectravideo (SVI)	Spectravideo (SVI)
The Roving Planet Styllus (aka機動惑星スティルス)	1986	Action	✓	✓	✓	✓	HAL Laboratory	HAL Laboratory
Royal Blood (aka ロイヤルブラッド)	1991	Strategy	✗	✓	✓	✓	Koei	Koei
Rune Worth			✗	✓	✓	✓	T&ESOFT	T&ESOFT
Rune Master	1989		✗	✓	✓	✓	Compile	Compile
Rune Master II	1990		✗	✓	✓	✓	Compile	Compile
Rune Master: War among Three Empires	1991		✗	✓	✓	✓	Compile	Compile
The Running Man	1989	Action	✓	✓	✓	✓	Grandslam Entertainments	MCM Software
Ryukyu (aka 琉球)	1990	Board games	✗	✓	✓	✓	Login Soft/Ryuji Kuwaki	Login Soft
Sabotaje	1987	Arcade	✓	✓	✓	✓	Genesis Soft	PJ Soft
Sabrina	1989	Arcade/Beat-'em-up	✓	✓	✓	✓	Genesis Soft/Iber Soft	MCM Software
Sacred oracle (aka おみくじ)	1983	Board games/Fortune telling	✓	✓	✓	✓	Champion Soft	Champion Soft
Safari	1987	Strategy/Dexterity	✗	✓	✓	✓	Data Beutner/Olav Dienst	Data Beutner
Safari X (aka サファリX)	1985	Action	✓	✓	✓	✓	Policy	Policy
Sailor Suit Dirty Experience Confessions Vol.1 - Lost Virgin (aka セーラー服いけな〜い体験告白集Vol.1 ロストヴァージン)	1988	Visual Novel	✗	✓	✓	✓	Lucifer Soft	All Circulation
Sailor Suit Dirty Experience Confessions Vol.2 - Temptation (aka セーラー服いけな〜い体験告白集Vol.2 テンプテーション)	1988	Visual Novel	✗	✓	✓	✓	Lucifer Soft	All Circulation
Sailor Suit Dirty Experience Confessions Vol.3 - Ecstasy (aka セーラー服いけな〜い体験告白集Vol.3 エクスタシー)	1988	Visual Novel	✗	✓	✓	✓	Lucifer Soft	All Circulation
Sailor's Delight	1987	Simulation	✓	✓	✓	✓	The Bytebusters	Eaglesoft
Saint Dragon	1990	Horizontal	✓	✓	✓	✓	Jaleco	Dro Soft
Salamander	1987		✓	✓	✓	✓	Konami	Konami
Salvage	1986	Adventure	✓	✓	✓	✓	Livewire	Livewire
Samantha Fox Strip Poker (aka International 7 Card Stud)	1986	Card game - Poker	✓	✓	✓	✓	Martech Games	Martech Games
Saotome School Blue Wind (aka 早乙女学園ブルーウィンド)	1990	Visual Novel/Adult	✗	✓	✓	✓	Studio ANGEL	All Circulation
Saotome School Prospectus (aka 早乙女学園入学案内)	1989	Visual Novel/Adult	✗	✓	✓	✓	Studio ANGEL	All Circulation
SAR (aka Search and Rescue)	1988	Simulation	✓	✓	✓	✓	Eurosoft	Premium III Software Distribution
Sasa	1983	Action	✓	✓	✓	✓	Mass Tael	ASCII Corporation
Satan	1989	Action	✓	✓	✓	✓		Dinamic
Saurusland (aka サウルスランド)	1984	Action/Platform	✓	✓	✓	✓	Tomy Company, Ltd.	Colpax
Sa-Zi-Ri	1988	RPG	✗	✓	✓	✓	Reno	Telenet Japan
Scarlet 7 - The Mightiest Women (aka スカーレット7)	1986	Text and Gfx	✓	✓	✓	✓	Soft Pro International	Toshiba-EMI Ltd.
Scentipede	1986	Arcade	✓	✓	✓	✓	Aackosoft	Aackosoft
Schach für MSX-Computer	1985	Board games	✓	✓	✓	✓	CE-TEC	CE-TEC
School Record of War (aka 学園戦記)	1989	Rpg/Adult	✗	✓	✓	✓	Alice Soft	Alice Soft
Schwarzschild II: Teikoku no Haishin (aka シュヴァルツシルトII 帝国の背信)	1990	Strategy	✗	✓	✓	✓	Kogado Studio	Kogado Studio
Science Fiction	1986	Text and Gfx	✓	✓	✓	✓	The Bytebusters	Eaglesoft
Scion (aka サイオン)	1984	Action	✓	✓	✓	✓	Seibu Denshi	Sony
Scope On (aka スコープオン)	1983	Shoot-'em-up	✓	✓	✓	✓	ASCII Corporation	ASCII Corporation
Score 3020	1989	Arcade	✓	✓	✓	✓	Topo Soft	Erbe Software
The Scramble (akaザ・スクランブル)	1983	Action/Simulation/Shoot-'em-up - Vertical	✓	✓	✓	✓	Marufune F.S.L	Marufune F.S.L
Scramble Eggs	1983	Puzzle	✓	✓	✓	✓	Ample Software	Ample Software
Scramble Formation (aka スクランブルフォーメーション)	1987	Vertical shooter	✗	✓	✓	✓	Taito	Taito
Scramble Spirits	1990	Shoot-'em-up	✓	✓	✓	✓	Grandslam Entertainments	Grandslam Entertainments
SD Gundam: Gachapon Senshi 2 "Capsule Senki" (aka SDガンダムガチャポン戦士2カプセル戦記)	1990	Strategy	✗	✓	✓	✓	Banpresto	Banpresto
SD Snatcher	1990	Adventure	✗	✓	✓	✓	Konami	Konami
Sea Bomber / HELP! (aka シーボンバー/HELP)	1983	Action / Variety	✓	✓	✓	✓	Hudson Soft	Hudson Soft
Sea Hunter	1985	Shoot-'em-up	✓	✓	✓	✓	Spectravideo (SVI)	Spectravideo (SVI)
Sea King	1986	Action	✓	✓	✓	✓	Players	Players
The Secret Diary of Adrian Mole Aged 13¾	1985	Adventure/Text only	✓	✓	✓	✓	Level 9 Computing	Mosaic Publishing
The Secret Garden (aka秘密の花園)	1992	Visual Novel	✗	✓	✓	✓	Technopolis Soft/Fairytale	Technopolis Soft
Secret Treasure of Moai			✓	✓	✓	✓		Casio
Secret Word (aka العالم السري)	1985	Variety	✓	✓	✓	✓	Al Alamiah	Al Alamiah
Seed of Dragon	1990		✗	✗	✗	✓		Riverhill Soft
Seiken Acho (aka Taekwon-Do, Kung-Fu Master, Kung-Fu Acho, 聖拳アチョー)	1985	Beat 'em up	✓	✓	✓	✓	IREM	ASCII Corporation
Seikima II Special	1987	Action	✗	✓	✓	✓	CBS/Sony	Sony
Seilane (aka セイレーン)	1987	Adventure	✗	✓	✓	✓	Microcabin	Microcabin
Senda Salvaje	1990		✓	✓	✓	✓	Gamesoft	Zigurat
Senjyo (aka センジョー)	1984	Shoot-'em-up	✓	✓	✓	✓	Tehkan Ltd.	Sony
Senno Knife: Demon Girls in the Labyrinth (aka 千之ナイフ 迷宮の魔少女)	1989	Rpg/Adult	✗	✓	✓	✓	I-cell	I-cell
Serra Pelada	1987	Text only	✓	✓	✓	✓	Renato Degiovani	Pro Kit
The Seven Adventures of Sindbad (akaシンドバッド7つの冒険)	1986	Action	✓	✓	✓	✓	Casio	Casio
Sewer Sam (aka スゥーワーサム)	1984	Action	✓	✓	✓	✓	Interphase	Toshiba-EMI Ltd.
Sexy Voice: Mysterious Wall (aka SEXY VOICE不思議の壁)	1988	Adult/Break-out	✗	✓	✓	✓	System House Oh!	System House Oh!
Sf Zone 1999 (aka SFゾーン1999)	1985	Adventure	✓	✓	✓	✓	Pixel	Sony
SH 738	1986	Variety	✓	✓	✓	✓	J B T SOFT	Ronex Computer AB
Shadow Hunter (aka シャドゥハンター)	1988	Adventure	✗	✓	✓	✓	Champion Soft	Champion Soft
Shadow of the Bear	1985	Adventure	✓	✓	✓	✓	D. Amies	Kuma Computers
Shanghai (aka 上海)	1988	Puzzle	✗	✓	✓	✓	Activision	System Soft
Shanghai II (aka 上海II)	1989	Puzzle	✗	✓	✓	✓	Activision	System Soft
Shark Hunter			✓	✓	✓	✓		Electric Software
Shenan Dragon (aka シェナンドラゴン)	1990	Rpg/Adult	✗	✓	✓	✓	Technopolis Soft	Technopolis Soft
Shinobi	1989	Action	✓	✓	✓	✓	SEGA/Mastertronic	Dro Soft
Shit!	1988	Arcade	✓	✓	✓	✓	Eurosoft	Premium III Software Distribution
Shnax	1985	Arcade	✓	✓	✓	✓	Jon Sawyer	Kuma Computers
Shogi (aka 将棋) (Toshiba)	1984	Board games	✓	✓	✓	✓	Toshiba	Toshiba
Shogi (aka 将棋) (Pony Canon)	1985	Board games	✓	✓	✓	✓	System Soft	Pony Canyon
Shogi (aka 将棋) (Microcabin)	1985	Board games	✓	✓	✓	✓	Microcabin	Microcabin
Shogi Expert (aka 将棋名人)	1985	Board games	✓	✓	✓	✓	Soft Pro International	Toshiba-EMI Ltd.
Shogi Mars (aka 軍人将棋軍神マース)	1985	Board game - Gunjin Shogi	✓	✓	✓	✓	COSMO MIDA	Toshiba-EMI
Shogun (aka 将軍)	1987	Rpg	✓	✓	✓	✓	Nippon Dexter/Virgin Games	Nippon Dexter
Shooting Collection (aka シューティングコレクション)	1992	Shoot-'em-up	✓	✓	✓	✓	ASCII Corporation	ASCII Corporation
Shop Boy	1988	Action	✓	✓	✓	✓	Mind Games España	Mind Games España
Shout Match (aka シャウトマッチ)	1987		✓	✓	✓	✓	Fun Project	Victor Co. of Japan (JVC)
Shup	1986		✓	✓	✓	✓	Mind Games España	Mind Games España
Silent Shadow	1988		✓	✓	✓	✓	Topo Soft	Erbe Software
Silfi (aka Silphy)	1988	Action	✓	✓	✓	✓	Genesis Soft/Iber Soft	Iber Soft
Silviana (aka シルヴィアーナ)	1989	Rpg	✗	✓	✓	✓	Pack-In-Video	Pack-In-Video
Sir Camelot y el Rey Arturo	1985	Adventure	✓	✓	✓	✓	Inforpress	Inforpress
Sir Fred	1986	Action	✓	✓	✓	✓	Made in Spain	Zigurat
Sirwood	1990	Action	✓	✓	✓	✓	Opera Soft	Opera Soft
Sito Pons 500cc. Grand Prix	1990	Racing	✓	✓	✓	✓	Zigurat	Zigurat
Skate Dragon	1986	Arcade	✓	✓	✓	✓	Idealogic	Idealogic
Ski Command (aka スキーコマンド)	1984	Vertical shooter	✓	✓	✓	✓	Casio	Casio
Ski game (aka スキーゲーム)	1984	Sport games	✓	✓	✓	✓	Central education	Central education
Skooter			✓	✓	✓	✓	The Bytebusters	Aackosoft
Skramble (aka Scramble)	1984	Arcade	✓	✓	✓	✓	Livewire	Livewire
Skull Exilon	1988	Action	✓	✓	✓	✓	Genesis Soft	Iber Soft
Sky Diver (aka スカイダイバー)	1984	Action	✓	✓	✓	✓	Hudson Soft	SoftBank
Sky Hawk	1985	Simulation	✓	✓	✓	✓	Manhattan Transfer	MSX Club (ES)
Sky Jaguar	1984		✓	✓	✓	✓		Konami
Sky Vision	1987	Shoot-'em-up	✓	✓	✓	✓	The Bytebusters	System 4
Sky War	1988	Shoot-'em-up/Horizontal	✓	✓	✓	✓	OMK Software	Discovery Informatic
Skyhawk	1986	Action	✓	✓	✓	✓	Bug-Byte Software	Bug-Byte Software
Slap-Shot! Hockey	1985		✓	✓	✓	✓	Indescomp	Anirog
Smack Wacker	1986	Arcade	✓	✓	✓	✓	The Bytebusters	Eaglesoft
Smaily	1991	Arcade	✓	✓	✓	✓	Zigurat	Zigurat
Small Boy's Quiz (aka 一寸法師のどんなもんだい)	1987	Action	✓	✓	✓	✓	Casio	Casio
Small Jones	1986	Platform	✓	✓	✓	✓	Visiogame	Visiogame
SMO Ondernemingsspel 2 (aka SMO Spel Tweede Ronde)	1986	Simulation	✓	✓	✓	✓	Vendex Software Development	SMO
Snake (MSX Club)	1987	Action	✓	✓	✓	✓	Manhattan Transfer	MSX Club (ES)
Snake (Eaglesoft)	1987	Arcade/Snake/nibbles	✓	✓	✓	✓	The Bytebusters	Eaglesoft
Snake It!			✓	✓	✓	✓		Eaglesoft
Snatcher	1988		✗	✓	✓	✓	Konami	Konami
Snowball	1983	Interactive fiction	✓	✓	✓	✓	Level 9 Computing	Level 9 Computing
Sonygraph Blackjack Mastermind Ahorcado	1985	Variety	✓	✓	✓	✓	Indescomp	Indescomp
The Snowman	1984	Platform	✓	✓	✓	✓	Quicksilva	Quicksilva
Snooper Troops Case 1: The Granite Point Ghost	1983	Educational	✓	✓	✓	✓	Spinnaker Software Corporation	Spinnaker Software Corporation
Snooper Troops Case 2 - The Case of the Disappearing Dolphin	1984	Educational	✓	✓	✓	✓	Spinnaker Software Corporation	Spinnaker Software Corporation
Soapland Story (aka ソープランドストーリー)	1988	RPG	✗	✓	✓	✓	HARD	HARD
Sokoban (aka 倉庫番)	1984	Puzzle	✓	✓	✓	✓	Thinking Rabbit	Thinking Rabbit
Sol Negro	1990	Action	✓	✓	✓	✓	Opera Soft	Opera Soft
Soldier of Light (aka ソルジャーオブライト)	1985	Shoot-'em-up	✓	✓	✓	✓	Taito	Taito
Solitaire Royale	1986	Cards games	✓	✓	✓	✓	Game Arts	Game Arts
Solo	1987	Shoot-'em-up	✓	✓	✓	✓	Opera Soft	Opera Soft
Sootland	1990	Arcade	✓	✓	✓	✓	Zafiro	Zafiro
Sorcerian: Dragon Slayer V	1991		✗	✓	✓	✓	Falcom	Falcom
Sorcery	1985		✓	✓	✓	✓	Virgin Games	Virgin Games
Soul of a Robot	1987	Arcade	✓	✓	✓	✓	Mastertronic	Mastertronic
Soviet			✓	✓	✓	✓		Opera Soft
Space 2000 (aka فضاء . . . ٢)	1990	Action	✓	✓	✓	✓	Al Alamiah	Al Alamiah
Space Businessman (aka 宇宙翔けるビジネスマン)	1991	Visual Novel	✗	✓	✓	✓	Studio ANGEL	All Circulation
Space Busters	1985	Vertical	✓	✓	✓	✓	Aackosoft/The Bytebusters	Aackosoft
Space Camp (aka スペースキャンプ)	1986	Shoot-'em-up	✓	✓	✓	✓	Pack-In-Video	Pack-In-Video
Space Combat	1989	Action	✓	✓	✓	✓	OMK Software	Barnajoc
Space Harrier II (aka Space Harrier 2)	1989	First-person shooter	✓	✓	✓	✓	Grandslam Entertainments	Grandslam Entertainments
Space Invaders (aka スペースインベーダー)	1985	Vertical	✓	✓	✓	✓	TAITO	Nidecom
Space Manbow	1989		✗	✓	✓	✓	Konami	Konami
Space Maze Attack (aka スペースメイズアタック)	1983	Action/Maze	✓	✓	✓	✓	HAL Laboratory	HAL Laboratory
The Space Opera - Dragon Eyes (akaドラゴンアイズ)	1991	Adventure/Adventure - Text and Gfx	✗	✓	✓	✓	Technopolis Soft/Fairytale	Technopolis Soft
Space Rescue	1986	Action	✓	✓	✓	✓	The Bytebusters	Eaglesoft
Space Shuttle	1986	Simulation	✓	✓	✓	✓	Activision	Activision
Space Smugglers	1989	Shoot-'em-up	✓	✓	✓	✓	MHT Ingenieros	Dro Soft
Space Trouble	1984		✓	✓	✓	✓	HAL Laboratory	Panasoft
Space Walk (aka Astronauta)	1985	Horizontal shooter	✓	✓	✓	✓	Mastertronic	Mastertronic
Spaghetti Western Simulator	1988	Simulation	✓	✓	✓	✓	Zeppelin Games Limited	Zeppelin Games Limited
Sparkie (aka スパーキー)	1984	Action	✓	✓	✓	✓	Konami	Sony
Spartan X (aka スパルタンX)	1985	Action	✓	✓	✓	✓	Pony Canon	Pony Canyon
Special Operations	1984		✓	✓	✓	✓	MC Lothlorien	MC Lothlorien
Speed King	1986		✓	✓	✓	✓		Mastertronic
Speedboat Racer	1987	Racing	✓	✓	✓	✓	The Bytebusters	Methodic Solutions
Spelunker	1986	Platformer	✓	✓	✓	✓		Irem
The Spider (akaザ・スパイダー)	1984	Action	✓	✓	✓	✓	Hudson Soft	SoftBank
Spirits	1987		✓	✓	✓	✓		Topo Soft
Spitfire '40	1986	Simulation	✓	✓	✓	✓	Mirrorsoft	Mirrorsoft
Splash (aka Attilio Tubicini)	1986	Action	✓	✓	✓	✓	Artificial Intelligence Products	Mind Games España
Spooks & Ladders (aka Spooks and Ladders)	1985	Platform	✓	✓	✓	✓	Steven Wallis/Sean Wallis	Kuma Computers
Sprinter (aka The Train Game)	1986	Simulation	✓	✓	✓	✓	The Bytebusters	Eaglesoft
Sprites Man	1984	Arcade	✓	✓	✓	✓	Sprites	Sprites
Spy Story	1986	Text and Gfx	✓	✓	✓	✓	The Bytebusters	Eaglesoft
Spy vs Spy II - The Island Caper	1987	Action	✓	✓	✓	✓	First Star Software	Databyte
Square Dancer (aka スクェアダンサー)	1984	Pinball	✓	✓	✓	✓	T&ESOFT	Toshiba-EMI Ltd.
Squishem (aka スクィッシュゼム)	1984	Action	✓	✓	✓	✓	Sirius	ASCII Corporation
Star Avenger	1984	Arcade	✓	✓	✓	✓	Sean Wallis	Kuma Computers
Star Blazer (aka スターブレーザー)	1985	Shoot-'em-up - Horizontal	✓	✓	✓	✓	Starcraft	Sony
Star Bowls	1991	Arcade	✓	✓	✓	✓	Diabolic	Zigurat
Star Command (aka スターコマンド)	1983	Action	✓	✓	✓	✓	ASCII Corporation	ASCII Corporation
Star Dust	1987	Arcade	✓	✓	✓	✓	Topo Soft	Erbe Software
Star Fighter	1986	Arcade	✓	✓	✓	✓	The Bytebusters	Eaglesoft
Star Fighters	1984		✓	✓	✓	✓	ASCII Corporation; LaserDisc Corporation	LaserDisc Corporation
Star Force	1985		✓	✓	✓	✓	Hudson Soft	Hudson Soft
Star Road (aka スターロード)	1985	Shoot-'em-up	✓	✓	✓	✓	Microcabin	Grupo de Trabajo Software (G.T.S.)
Star Runner	1986	Shoot-'em-up	✓	✓	✓	✓	Manhattan Transfer	MSX Club (ES)
Star Sand Story (aka 星の砂物語)	1991	Adventure/Adult	✗	✓	✓	✓	D.O. Corp.	D.O. Corp.
Star Soldier	1986		✓	✓	✓	✓		Hudson Soft
Star Trek	1986	Action	✓	✓	✓	✓	SEGA	SEGA
Star Virgin (aka スターヴァージン)	1988	Action	✗	✓	✓	✓	Pony Canyon	Pony Canyon
Star Wars	1986	Action	✓	✓	✓	✓	The Bytebusters	Eaglesoft
Starbite	1988	Arcade	✓	✓	✓	✓	Eurosoft	Premium III Software Distribution
Starbuggy	1988	Arcade	✓	✓	✓	✓	Eurosoft	Premium III Software Distribution
Starbyte	1987	Arcade	✓	✓	✓	✓	Action Soft	Mister Chip
Starquake	1985	Action-adventure/Maze	✓	✓	✓	✓	Bubble Bus Software	Bubble Bus Software
Stars MSX Nº2	1985	Variety	✓	✓	✓	✓	Stars	Stars
Stars MSX Nº4	1985	Variety	✓	✓	✓	✓	Stars	Stars
Starship Rendezvous	1988		✗	✓	✓	✓	Scaptrust	Scaptrust
Starship Simulator	1984		✓	✓	✓	✓		ASCII Corporation
Steinzeit	1987	Action	✗	✓	✓	✓	Data Beutner	Stone Castle
Step Up	1983		✓	✓	✓	✓	Takara	Marvel Soft
Stepper (aka ステッパー)	1985	Puzzle	✓	✓	✓	✓	Isoco	ASCII Corporation
Steve Davis Snooker	1986	Sport games	✓	✓	✓	✓	CDS Software	CDS Software
The Stone of Agni (akaアグニの石)	1989	Visual Novel	✗	✓	✓	✓	Humming Bird Soft	Humming Bird Soft
The Stone of Wisdom (Kenja no ishi)	1986	Action game	✓	✓	✓	✓		Casio
Stop Ball	1987	Arcade/Break-out	✓	✓	✓	✓	Juliet Software	Dro Soft
Storm	1986		✓	✓	✓	✓	Mastertronic	Mastertronic
Stormbringer	1987	Graphic adventure	✓	✓	✓	✓	David Jones	Mastertronic
Stop the Express (aka 暴走特急SOS)	1984	Jump and run	✓	✓	✓	✓	Hudson Soft	Japanese Softbank
Streaker	1987		✓	✓	✓	✓	Mastertronic	Mastertronic
Strange Loop	1986	Shoot-'em-up	✓	✓	✓	✓	Virgin Games	Virgin Games
Strategic Mars (aka ストラテジックマーズ)	1989	Strategy	✗	✓	✓	✓	DB-SOFT	DB-SOFT
Strike Force Harrier	1986	Simulation	✓	✓	✓	✓	Mirrorsoft	Mirrorsoft
Strike Mission (aka ストライクミッション)	1984	Shoot-'em-up - Vertical	✓	✓	✓	✓	Laserdisc Corporation	Laserdisc Corporation
Strip Poker II Plus	1987	Adult/Cards games	✓	✓	✓	✓	Anco	Anco
Submarine Shooter (aka サブマリンシューター)	1984	Shoot-'em-up	✓	✓	✓	✓	Hudson Soft	Hudson Soft
Sue Townsend's The Growing Pains of Adrian Mole	1987	Adventure	✓	✓	✓	✓	Level 9 Computing	Virgin Games
Sunny then Turbulent	1985	Visual Novel	✓	✓	✓	✓	Cocktail Soft	Cocktail Soft
Supa Robo	1985	Action	✓	✓	✓	✓	Mass Tael	Spectravideo (SVI)
Super Billiards (aka スーパービリヤード)	1983	Sport games	✓	✓	✓	✓	HAL Laboratory	HAL Laboratory
Super Bowl	1985		✓	✓	✓	✓		Budgie
Super Cobra	1983		✓	✓	✓	✓	Konami	Konami
Super Cooks			✗	✓	✓	✓		Compile
Super Cross Force (aka スーパークロスフォース)	1983	Unknown	✓	✓	✓	✓	Spectravideo (SVI)	Spectravideo (SVI)
Super Daisenryaku (aka スーパー大戦略)	1988	Simulation	✗	✓	✓	✓	System Soft	Microcabin
Super Drinker (aka SUPER DRINKER)	1983	Action	✓	✓	✓	✓	Ample Software	Ample Software
Super Game Collection (aka スーパーゲームコレクション)	1985	Action	✓	✓	✓	✓	Sony	Sony
Super Golf (aka スーパーゴルフ)	1984	Sport games	✓	✓	✓	✓	Comtec	Sony
Super Lander	1987	Arcade/Dexterity	✓	✓	✓	✓	Courbois Software	Courbois Software
Super Laydock	1987		✓	✓	✓	✓		T&E Soft
Super Lode Runner	1987	Single-screen platformer/Puzzle - Action puzzle	✗	✓	✓	✓	Irem	Irem
Super Pachinko (aka スーパーパチンコ)	1985	Board games	✓	✓	✓	✓	Colpax	Colpax
Super Patience	1987	Cards games	✓	✓	✓	✓	Kees Reedijk	Timesoft
Super Pierrot (aka スーパーピエロ)	1987	Action	✓	✓	✓	✓	Universal	Nidecom
Super Program Collection 3 (aka スーパープロコレ3)	1992	Variety	✓	✓	✓	✓	Tokuma Shoten Intermedia	Tokuma Shoten Intermedia
Super Program Collection 4 (aka スーパープロコレ4)	1993	Variety	✓	✓	✓	✓	Tokuma Shoten Intermedia	Tokuma Shoten Intermedia
Super Program Collection 5 (aka スーパープロコレ5)	1993	Variety	✓	✓	✓	✓	Tokuma Shoten Intermedia	Tokuma Shoten Intermedia
Super quiz (aka スーパークイズ)	1989	Board games/Adult	✗	✓	✓	✓	DOTT Plan	DOTT Plan
Super Rambo Special (aka スーパーランボースペシャル)	1986	Action/Rpg	✗	✓	✓	✓	ZAP	Pack-In-Video
Super Runner	1987	Puzzle - Action puzzle	✗	✓	✓	✓	Pony Canyon	Pony Canyon
Super Sapiens	1989	Educational/Board games/Quiz	✓	✓	✓	✓	PJ Soft	Proein Soft Line
Super Snake (aka スーパースネーク)	1983	Action/Snake/nibbles	✓	✓	✓	✓	HAL Laboratory	HAL Laboratory
Super Soccer (aka スーパーサッカー)	1985	Sport games	✓	✓	✓	✓	Takara	Sony
Super Tanker	1987	Simulation	✗	✓	✓	✓	Data Beutner	Stone Castle
Super Tennis (aka スーパーテニス)	1984	Sport games	✓	✓	✓	✓	Takara	Sony
Super Tritorn (aka スーパートリトーン)	1986	Rpg	✗	✓	✓	✓	Sein Soft / XAIN Soft / Zainsoft	Sein Soft / XAIN Soft / Zainsoft
Superchess	1984	Board games	✓	✓	✓	✓	Kuma Computers	Kuma Computers
Superman: The Man of Steel	1988		✓	✓	✓	✓		Tynesoft
Supertripper	1985	Arcade	✓	✓	✓	✓	Indescomp	Indescomp
Surprise Disc 2: Exciting Adventure Game (aka びっくりディスクII エキサイティングアドベンチャーゲーム)		Variety	✓	✓	✓	✓	Victor Co. of Japan (JVC)	Victor Co. of Japan (JVC)
Survivors	1986		✓	✓	✓	✓		Atlantis Software
Survivor	1987		✓	✓	✓	✓		Topo Soft
Sweet Acorn	1984		✓	✓	✓	✓	Taito	Nidecom
Sweet Emotion	1991	Visual Novel	✓	✓	✓	✓	Discovery Software	Discovery Software
Swimming Tango (aka スイミングタンゴ)	1984	Action	✓	✓	✓	✓	HAL Laboratory	HAL Laboratory
Swing Man	1985	Action	✓	✓	✓	✓	Spectravideo (SVI)	Spectravideo (SVI)
SWIV	1991	Shoot-'em-up	✗	✓	✓	✓	Storm	Dro Soft
System Demonstration plus Smashout and Othello	?	Variety	✓	✓	✓	✓	Knights Computers	Knights Computers
T.D.F: Great Monster War – Desperate Reactor Defense Operation (aka TDF大怪獣戦争 電力炉防衛作戦)	1988	Strategy	✗	✓	✓	✓	Data West	Data West
T.N.T (MSX Club)	?	Arcade	✓	✓	✓	✓	Manhattan Transfer	MSX Club (ES)
T.N.T (Infogrames)	1987	Arcade	✓	✓	✓	✓	Infogrames	Infogrames
Taalbedrijf	1989	Educational	✓	✓	✓	✓	Filosoft	Aschcom
Taalbedrijf + Rekenen tot 20 + Optellen/Aftrekken	1987	Educational	✓	✓	✓	✓	Aschcom	Aschcom
Tai-Pan	1986	Action Adventure	✓	✓	✓	✓	Ocean Software	Erbe Software
Taiyou no Shinden - Asteka II (aka太陽の神殿 アステカII)	1987	Adventure	✗	✓	✓	✓	Tokyo Shoseki	Falcom
Take the B Train (akaB電車で行こう)	—	Text and Gfx	✓	✓	✓	✓	Atorasu	Atorasu
Talismán	1987	Platform	✓	✓	✓	✓	A.G.D., Unicornio Soft	P.P.P. Ediciones
Talvisota	1987	Strategy - Wargame	✓	✓	✓	✓	Olli Kainulainen	TrioSoft
Tanba (akaたんば)	1988	Board games	✗	✓	✓	✓	Micronet Co., Ltd.	Micronet Co., Ltd.
Tank	1986	Action	✓	✓	✓	✓	Boss Company	Boss Company
Tank Battalion	1984		✓	✓	✓	✓	Namco	Namco
Tape Login MSX Game Book (aka 別冊テープログインMSX GAME BOOK)	1985	Variety	✓	✓	✓	✓	Login Soft	Login Soft
Target Plus (aka ターゲットプラス ガンステックバージョン)	1988	Action	✓	✓	✓	✓	Dinamic	Dinamic
Tarot (aka タロット)	1985	Board games/Adult	✓	✓	✓	✓	Nice Ideas	Nice Ideas
Tatica	1985	Action	✓	✓	✓	✓	Mass Tael	ASCII Corporation
Tawara (aka 俵)	1984	Board games	✓	✓	✓	✓	ASCII Corporation	ASCII Corporation
Tawheed	1989	Adventure	✗	✓	✓	✓	Champion Soft	Champion Soft
Team Sanyo & Harvey Smith Showjumper	1985	Sports - Equestrian	✓	✓	✓	✓	Software Projects	Software Projects
Tear of Nile	1986	Adventure	✓	✓	✓	✓	Cross Media Soft	Cross Media Soft
Teenage Mutant Hero Turtles	1990	Action	✗	✓	✓	✓	Konami	Image Works
Tele Bunnie (aka テレバニー)	1984	Action	✓	✓	✓	✓	Mass Tael	ASCII Corporation
Telephone Club Story Special	1988	Visual Novel	✗	✓	✓	✓	Wilduck	C.B.C.
Temptation of Madonna	1990	Adventure/Adult	✗	✓	✓	✓	Amadeus	Amadeus
The Games Collection	1988	Miscellaneous	✗	✓	✓	✓	Eurosoft	Eurosoft
The Games Collection 2	1989	Variety	✗	✓	✓	✓	Eurosoft	Eurosoft
The Temptation of the Apartment Wife (aka団地妻の誘惑)	1985	Adventure/Adult	✓	✓	✓	✓	Koei	Koei
Temptations	1988		✓	✓	✓	✓	Topo Soft	Erbe Software
Tenkyuhai (aka 天九牌)	1989	Board games/Adult	✗	✓	✓	✓	Panther Software	Panther Software
Tensai Rabbian Daifunsen (aka 天才ラビアン大奮戦)	1986	Action	✓	✓	✓	✓	Soft Pro International	Toshiba-EMI Ltd.
Tensión	1988	Action/Platform	✓	✓	✓	✓	SPE	System 4
Terminus - The Prison Planet	1987	Adventure/Platform	✓	✓	✓	✓	Mastertronic	M.A.D.
Terramex	1988		✓	✓	✓	✓		Grandslam Entertainment
Terror en la Facultad	1987	Action/Educational	✓	✓	✓	✓	Edisoft	Sygran, S.A.
Terrorpods	1989	Action	✓	✓	✓	✓	Melbourne House	Dro Soft
Test Drive II - The Duel	1989	Racing	✓	✓	✓	✓	Accolade	Dro Soft
Testament (aka テスタメント)	1988	Action/Maze	✗	✓	✓	✓	Glodia	Basho House
Tetra Horror (aka テトラホラー)	1983	Action	✓	✓	✓	✓	Mass Tael	ASCII Corporation
Tetris (Bullet-Proof Software)	1988	Tile-matching	✗	✓	✓	✓	Bullet-Proof Software	Bullet-Proof Software
Tetris (Mirrorsoft)	1987	Tile-matching	✓	✓	✓	✓	Rowan Software	Mirrorsoft
Tetsuman (aka てつまん)	1985	Board games	✓	✓	✓	✓	HAL Laboratory	HAL Laboratory
Thanatos (aka サナトス)	1991	Visual Novel	✗	✓	✓	✓	Birdy Soft	Birdy Soft
Thexder	1986		✓	✓	✓	✓	Compile	Game Arts
Thor	1988	Arcade	✓	✓	✓	✓	Proein Soft Line	Proein Soft Line
Thunder Ball (akaサンダーボール)	1985	Pinball	✓	✓	✓	✓	ASCII Corporation	ASCII Corporation
Thunder Storm (akaサンダーストーム)	1984	Action	✓	✓	✓	✓	Data East	Victor Co. of Japan (JVC)
Thunderbal	1986	Action	✗	✓	✓	✓	The Bytebusters	Eaglesoft
Thunderbirds	1989	Action	✓	✓	✓	✓	Teque Software Dev	Grandslam Entertainments
ThunderBlade	1988	Action / Shoot-'em-up	✓	✓	✓	✓	SEGA	Erbe Software
Thunderbolt (akaサンダーボルト)	1986	Rpg	✓	✓	✓	✓	Pixel	Pixel
Time Bandits	1984		✓	✓	✓	✓	PSS	PSS
Time Bomb	1987	Platform	✓	✓	✓	✓	Double Brain!	Methodic Solutions / System 4
Time Curb	1986	Arcade / Shoot-'em-up - Vertical	✓	✓	✓	✓	Aackosoft	Eaglesoft
Time Gal (akaタイムギャル)	1986	Adventure	✓	✓	✓	✓	TAITO	Victor Co. of Japan (JVC)
Time Out	1988	Arcade	✓	✓	✓	✓	New Frontier	Zafiro
Time Pilot	1983		✓	✓	✓	✓	Konami	Konami
Time Rider	1988	Shoot-'em-up	✓	✓	✓	✓	Eurosoft	Premium III Software Distribution
Time Scanner	1989	Pinball	✓	✓	✓	✓	Activision	MCM Software
Time Trax	1986	Puzzle	✓	✓	✓	✓	Bug-Byte Software	Bug-Byte Software
Time Trek (akaタイムトレック)	1985	Adventure / Text and Gfx	✓	✓	✓	✓	Policy	KG Soft
Tir-nan-óg: The Forbidden Tower	1990	Rpg	✗	✓	✓	✓	System Soft	System Soft
Titanic	1988	Arcade	✓	✓	✓	✓	Topo Soft	Kixx
Toi Acid Game	1989	Action	✓	✓	✓	✓	Iber Soft	MCM Software
Tokimeki Sesil	1990	Board games/Adult	✗	✓	✓	✓	Technopolis Soft/Inter Link/Tokuma Communications	Technopolis Soft
Tokimeki Sports Gal (akaときめきスポーツギャル)	1988	Quiz	✗	✓	✓	✓	Adult Inn	Adult Inn
Tokimeki Sports Gal 2 (akaときめきスポーツギャルII)	1988	Quiz	✗	✓	✓	✓	Adult Inn	Adult Inn
Tokimeki Sports Gal 3 (akaときめきスポーツギャルIII)	1988	Quiz	✗	✓	✓	✓	Adult Inn	Adult Inn
Tokimeki World Cup (akaときめきワールドカップ)	1990	Cards games	✗	✓	✓	✓	Atsic	Atsic
Tokyo Gang	1990	Arcade	✓	✓	✓	✓	G.LL. Software	G.LL. Software
Tokyo Nampa Street (akaTOKYOナンパストリート)	1986	Simulation/Adult	✓	✓	✓	✓	ENIX/Sekino Hikaru	ENIX
Tom & Jerry	1989	Arcade	✓	✓	✓	✓	Magic Bytes	Erbe Software
Tomboy Becky's Large Adventure	1983	Single-screen platformer	✓	✓	✓	✓	Micro Information Associates	Micro Information Associates
Tonight-Until-Morning Powerful Mahjong 2 (aka今夜も朝までパワフルまあじゃん2)	1988	Board games / Adult	✗	✓	✓	✓	dB-SOFT	dB-SOFT
Toobin	1988	Action	✗	✓	✓	✓	Tengen Inc.	Domark / Erbe Software
Top Roller	1984		✓	✓	✓	✓	Jaleco	Toshiba-EMI
Topografie Europa	1986	Action/Educational	✓	✓	✓	✓	Radarsoft	Philips / Aackosoft
Topografie Nederland	1986	Action/Educational	✓	✓	✓	✓	Radarsoft	Philips / Aackosoft
Topografie Wereld	1986	Action/Educational	✓	✓	✓	✓	Radarsoft	Philips / Aackosoft
Topple Zip	1986		✓	✓	✓	✓		Bothtec
Topple Zip (MSX2)	1987		✗	✓	✓	✓		Bothtec
Tour 91	1991	Sport games / Racing	✓	✓	✓	✓	Topo Soft	Erbe Software
Toushin City (aka 闘神都市)	1991	Visual Novel/Adult	✗	✓	✓	✓	Alice Soft	Alice Soft
The Tower of Cabin	1992	Action	✗	✓	✓	✓	Micro Cabin	Micro Cabin
The Tower of Druaga	1986	Action-adventure/Maze	✓	✓	✓	✓	Namco	Namco
Traffic	1986		✓	✓	✓	✓	Andromeda Software	Sony
Trailblazer	1986	Scrolling platformer	✓	✓	✓	✓	Gremlin Graphics	Gremlin Graphics
Tranquilizer Cards	1984	Puzzle	✓	✓	✓	✓	Central education	Central education
Trans-Europe Rally	1984	Racing	✓	✓	✓	✓	PMCG Soft	ABC-Soft
Trantor, The last Stormtrooper	1987	Action	✓	✓	✓	✓	Probe Software	Go!
Tras el Unicornio	1987	Arcade	✓	✓	✓	✓	Azimut Soft	Azimut Soft
Trashman	1985	Arcade	✓	✓	✓	✓	PSS	PSS
Treasure (aka الكنز)	1987	Action	✓	✓	✓	✓	Barq	Barq
Treasure Island	1986	Adventure	✗	✓	✓	✓	Windham Classics	Philips Spain
Treasure of the Amazons (aka アマゾネスの秘宝)	1988	Visual Novel	✗	✓	✓	✓	Studio Lime	Studio Lime
Trial Ski (aka トライアルスキー)	1984	Sport games	✓	✓	✓	✓	ASCII Corporation	ASCII Corporation
Trick Boy	1984	Arcade	✓	✓	✓	✓	T&ESOFT	T&ESOFT
Tricky	1984	Puzzle	✗	✓	✓	✓	Telenet Japan	Telenet Japan
Trigger	1989	Arcade	✓	✓	✓	✓	Opera Soft	Opera Soft
Trilogy: Kuki Ayaka True Legend (aka トリロジー 久木綾香の真実)	1990	Adventure	✗	✓	✓	✓	HARD	Gun Deck
Triple Comando	1988	Arcade	✓	✓	✓	✓	Xortrapa Soft	Dro Soft
Tritorn (akaトリトーン)	1986	Adventure	✗	✓	✓	✓	Sein Soft / XAIN Soft / Zainsoft	Sein Soft / XAIN Soft / Zainsoft
Tritorn II - Road of Darkness (aka トリトーンII)	1989	Text and Gfx	✗	✓	✓	✓	Sein Soft / XAIN Soft / Zainsoft	Sein Soft / XAIN Soft / Zainsoft
Trivial Pursuit	1986	Quiz	✓	✓	✓	✓	Domark	Erbe Software
Trump Aid (aka トランプエイド)	1986	Board games	✓	✓	✓	✓	Softvision	Toshiba-EMI Ltd.
TT Racer	1987	Racing	✓	✓	✓	✓	Methodic Solutions	Methodic Solutions
Tuareg	1988	Action	✓	✓	✓	✓	Topo Soft	Erbe Software
Tuma-7	1990	Arcade	✓	✓	✓	✓	Diabolic	Delta Software
Tumego 120 (aka 関西棋院監修 詰碁120)	1987	Board games	✓	✓	✓	✓	Champion Soft	Champion Soft
Turbo Chess	1986	Board games	✓	✓	✓	✓	Artic Computing	Artic Computing
Turbo Girl	1988	Arcade	✓	✓	✓	✓	Gamesoft	Dinamic
Turbo MSX Ano.1 Vol.6	?	Variety	✓	✓	✓	✓	GEASA	GEASA
Turbo MSX Ano.2 Vol.1	?	Variety	✓	✓	✓	✓	GEASA	GEASA
Turbo MSX Ano.2 Vol.5	?	Variety	✓	✓	✓	✓	GEASA	GEASA
Turbo Pack A	1987	Variety	✓	✓	✓	✓	Philips Spain	Philips Spain
Turbo Pack B	1987	Variety	✓	✓	✓	✓	Philips Spain	Philips Spain
Turbo Pack C	1987	Variety	✓	✓	✓	✓	Philips Spain	Philips Spain
Turboat (aka ターボート)	1984	Action	✓	✓	✓	✓	Mass Tael	ASCII Corporation
Turmoil (Bug-Byte)	1986		✓	✓	✓	✓		Bug-Byte Software
Turmoil (Panasonic) (aka ターモイル)	1984	Shoot-'em-up (All)	✓	✓	✓	✓	Sirius	Panasonic
Twilight Zone II - Nagisa's Mansion (aka トワイライトゾーンIIなぎさの館)	1988	Rpg/Adult	✗	✓	✓	✓	Great	Great
Twilight Zone III - Long and Sweet Night (aka トワイライトゾーンIII長くて甘い夜)	1989	Rpg/Adult	✗	✓	✓	✓	Great	Great
Twilight Zone IV: Special Edition (aka トワイライトゾーンIV特別編)	1990	Rpg/Adult	✗	✓	✓	✓	Great	Great
Twin Hammer	1989	Arcade	✗	✓	✓	✓	Best	Best
TwinBee	1986		✓	✓	✓	✓		Konami
Twinslag	1991	Board games	✓	✓	✓	✓	Stichting CODE	Vroegop Postorders
Typing Vader (aka タイピングベーダー)	1984	Action/Dexterity	✓	✓	✓	✓	Policy	Policy
TZR Grandprix Rider (aka TZRグランプリライダー)	1986	Racing	✓	✓	✓	✓	ASCII Corporation	ASCII Corporation
U boat (aka Uボート/Unterseeboot)	1985	Action	✓	✓	✓	✓	Omega system	Omega system
U-Boot	1985	Simulation	✓	✓	✓	✓	Manhattan Transfer	MSX Club (ES)
Uchi Mata (aka Judo Uchi - Mata)	1987	Sport games	✓	✓	✓	✓	Martech Games	Martech Games
UFO Invader (aka UFOインベーダー)	1983	Shoot-'em-up (All)	✓	✓	✓	✓	Marufune F.S.L	Marufune F.S.L
Ulises	1989	Arcade	✓	✓	✓	✓	Opera Soft	Opera Soft
Ultima I - The First Age of Darkness (aka ウルティマI)	1989	Rpg	✗	✓	✓	✓	Origin Systems	Pony Canyon
Ultima II - The Revenge of the Enchantress (aka ウルティマII)	1989	Rpg	✗	✓	✓	✓	Origin Systems	Pony Canyon
Ultima III - Exodus (aka ウルティマ〜恐怖のエクソダス〜)	1988	Rpg	✗	✓	✓	✓	Origin Systems	Pony Canyon
Ultima IV - Quest of the Avatar (aka ウルティマIV)	1987	Rpg	✗	✓	✓	✓	Origin Systems	Pony Canyon
Ultra Chess	1985	Board game - Chess	✓	✓	✓	✓		Aackosoft
Ultraman (aka ウルトラマン)	1984	Action	✓	✓	✓	✓	BANDAI	BANDAI
Undeadline	1989		✗	✓	✓	✓		T&E Soft
Uncharted Waters (aka 大航海時代)	1990	Simulation	✗	✓	✓	✓	KOEI	KOEI
Underground	1988	Platform	✓	✓	✓	✓	System 4	System 4
Urotsukidoji: Legend of the Overfiend (aka うろつき童子)	1990	Adventure / Adult	✗	✓	✓	✓	Fairytale	Fairytale
Urusei Yatsura: Koi no Survival Party	1987		✗	✓	✓	✓	Arrow Soft	Micro Cabin
Uşas	1987		✗	✓	✓	✓		Konami
The Untouchables	1989	Action	✓	✓	✓	✓	Ocean Software	Ocean Software
V/Stol Fighter (aka V/STOLファイター)	1988	Simulation	✓	✓	✓	✓	Mirrorsoft	Mirrorsoft/ASCII Corporation
Vacuumania	1984	Arcade	✓	✓	✓	✓	PSS	PSS
Valis Club Vol. 1 (aka ヴァリスCLUB Vol.1)	1989	Puzzle/Snake-nibbles	✓	✓	✓	✓	Telenet Japan/Wolf Team	SoftBank
Valkyr	1985	Arcade	✓	✓	✓	✓	Gremlin Graphics	Gremlin Graphics
Vampire (Codemasters)	1987		✓	✓	✓	✓	Codemasters	Codemasters
Vampire (MSX Club)	1986	Platform	✓	✓	✓	✓	Manhattan Transfer	MSX Club (ES)
Vampire's Empire	1988	Platform	✓	✓	✓	✓	Magic Bytes	Magic Bytes
Vampire Killer (aka 悪魔城ドラキュラ)	1986	Action-platformer	✗	✓	✓	✓	Konami	Konami
Vaxol	1987	Shoot-'em-up	✓	✓	✓	✓	Heart Soft	Heart Soft
Vegetable Crash (aka ベジタブルクラッシュ)	1984	Shoot-'em-up/Vertical	✓	✓	✓	✓	Hudson Soft	Hudson Soft
Venus Fire (aka ヴィーナス・ファイヤー)	1987	Action	✓	✓	✓	✓	Cross Media Soft	Victor Co. of Japan (JVC)
The Vera Cruz Affair	1989	Adventure	✓	✓	✓	✓	Infogrames	Infogrames
Version 2 - Emmy - The Funny Game (aka エミーII)	1985	Dating Simulation	✗	✓	✓	✓	Kogado Studio	ASCII Corporation
Vestron	1986	Action	✓	✓	✓	✓	Players	Armati Soft
Viaje al centro de la tierra	1987	Adventure	✓	✓	✓	✓	Topo Soft	Topo Soft
Viaje Espacial	1986	Adventure/Educational	✓	✓	✓	✓	Anaya Multimedia	Anaya Multimedia
Viaje por la C.E.E.	1986	Adventure/Educational	✓	✓	✓	✓	Mind Games España	Mind Games España
Victorious Nine II: High School Baseball Edition (aka ビクトリアスナインII高校野球編)	1987	Sport games	✗	✓	✓	✓	TAITO	Nidecom
Video Poker	1985	Cards games	✓	✓	✓	✓	Engesoft	Engesoft
Visi Goth (aka ビジゴス)	1985	Action	✓	✓	✓	✓	Soft Pro International	Soft Pro International
The Visitor	1988	Adventure/Text only	✓	✓	✓	✓	Mind Games España/Bazar Catalunya	Bazar Catalunya
Void Runner	1987		✓	✓	✓	✓		Mastertronic
Volguard (aka ヴォルガード)	1985	Shoot-'em-up (All)	✓	✓	✓	✓	dB-SOFT	dB-SOFT
Vortex Raider	1988	Action	✓	✓	✓	✓	Eurosoft	Premium III Software Distribution
VROOM - Motorcycle Race (aka VROOM)	1985	Racing	✓	✓	✓	✓	Victor Co. of Japan (JVC)	Victor Co. of Japan (JVC)
W-ing (aka 対決！合体ロボ)	1985	Action	✓	✓	✓	✓	Nippon Columbia	Colpax
The Wall	1985	Arcade	✓	✓	✓	✓	Erbe Software	Erbe Software
Vicious Viper (aka Snakes)	1985	Arcade / Snake/nibbles	✓	✓	✓	✓	Knights Computers	Knights Computers
Wallball	1985	Break-out	✓	✓	✓	✓	Tynesoft	Micro Value
War Chess	1986	Strategy	✓	✓	✓	✓	Ludic Bit	Idealogic
War of the Dead (aka 死霊戦線)	1987	Adventure/Action	✗	✓	✓	✓	Fun Project	Victor Co. of Japan (JVC)
War of the Dead Part 2 (aka 死霊戦線2)	1988	Adventure/action	✗	✓	✓	✓	Fun Project	Victor Co. of Japan (JVC)
WARNING (aka ウォーニング)	1988	Simulation/RPG	✗	✓	✓	✓	Cosmos Computer	Cosmos Computer
Warp & Warp	1984		✓	✓	✓	✓	Namco	Namco
Warrior (ウォーリア)	1983	RPG	✓	✓	✓	✓	ASCII Corporation	ASCII Corporation
Warroid			✓	✓	✓	✓		ASCII Corporation
Way to Baseball II (aka Super Baseball II)	1990	Sport games	✗	✓	✓	✓	Nihon Create	Brother Industries
The Way of the Tiger	1986	Action	✓	✓	✓	✓	Gremlin Graphics	Gremlin Graphics
Way of the Tiger II: Avenger	1986	Action-adventure	✓	✓	✓	✓	Gremlin Graphics	Gremlin Graphics
WEC Le Mans	1988	Racing	✓	✓	✓	✓	Konami/Coreland	Imagine
Wedding bells (aka ウェディングベル)	1984	Action	✓	✓	✓	✓	Nippon Columbia	Colpax
Wells & Fargo	1988	Arcade	✓	✓	✓	✓	Topo Soft	Erbe Software
West	1987	Action	✓	✓	✓	✓	M. Belardi	Newsoft
Whack-A-Mole Keyboard Practice (aka モグラたたきキーボード練習)	1984	Action/Educational	✓	✓	✓	✓	Stratford Computer Center Corporation	Stratford Computer Center Corporation
What's Michael?	1989	Adventure	✗	✓	✓	✓	Microcabin	Microcabin
Wheels	1985	Racing	✓	✓	✓	✓	CE-TEC	CE-TEC
Who Dares Wins II	1986	Action/Shoot-'em-up	✓	✓	✓	✓	Alligata	Alligata
Wilco	1986	Arcade	✓	✓	✓	✓	Manhattan Transfer	MSX Club (ES)
Wild Cat	1985	Shoot-'em-up/Vertical	✓	✓	✓	✓	Nippon Columbia	Colpax
Wild Geese (aka ワイルドギース)	1993	Simulation/Racing	✗	✓	✓	✓	Nippon Telenet	Nippon Telenet
Wing Man (aka ウイングマン)	1985	Action	✓	✓	✓	✓	TamTam Co., Ltd.	ENIX
Wing Man 2 (aka ウイングマン2)	1987	Action/Adventure	✗	✓	✓	✓	TamTam Co., Ltd.	ENIX
Wing Man Special (aka ウイングマンスペシャル)	1988	Adventure	✗	✓	✓	✓	TamTam Co., Ltd.	ENIX
Wings of Arugisu (aka アルギースの翼)	1988	RPG	✗	✓	✓	✓	Kogado Studio	Kogado Studio
Winning Solution (aka ウイニングソリューション)	1990	Strategy	✗	✓	✓	✓	S.G.I.	Cosmos Computer
Winter Events	1987	Sport games	✓	✓	✓	✓	Anco	Anco
Winter Games (aka ウインターゲームズ)	1986	Sport games	✓	✓	✓	✓	Ocean	Epyx
Winter Olympics	1986	Sports	✓	✗	✗	✗		Tynesoft
Wizard of Wor	?	Action/Arcade	✓	✓	✓	✓	Micromancers	Micromancers
The Wizard of Oz	1986	Adventure/Text and Gfx	✓	✓	✓	✓	Windham Classics	Philips Spain
Wizard's Lair	1986	Action	✓	✓	✓	✓	Bubble Bus	Bubble Bus
Wizardry: Knight of Diamonds - The Second Scenario (aka ウィザードリィ シナリオ #2 ダイヤモンドの騎士)	1989	Rpg	✗	✓	✓	✓	Sir-Tech Software	ASCII Corporation
Wizardry: Legacy of Llylgamyn - The Third Scenario (aka ウィザードリィ シナリオ #3 リルガミンの遺産)	1990	Rpg	✗	✓	✓	✓	Sir-Tech Software	ASCII Corporation
Wizardry: Proving Grounds of the Mad Overlord (aka ウィザードリィ 狂王の試練場)	1987	Rpg	✗	✓	✓	✓	Sir-Tech Software	ASCII Corporation
Wolf of the Battlefield (aka Commando)	1987		✓	✓	✓	✓		ASCII Corporation
Wonderful Adventures of a Little Princess (aka リトルプリンセス)	1987	Visual Novel/Adult	✗	✓	✓	✓	Alice Soft	Alice Soft
World Cup Italia 90 (aka World Cup Soccer)	1988	Sports - Soccer	✓	✓	✓	✓	Animagic	Nova Trade
World Cup Soccer - For talent scouting	1986	Simulation	✓	✓	✓	✓	Eaglesoft	Eaglesoft
World Games	1987	Sport games	✓	✓	✓	✓	Epyx	US Gold
World Golf (aka ワールドゴルフ)	1985	Sport games	✗	✓	✓	✓	ENIX	ENIX
World Golf II (aka ワールドゴルフII)	1988	Sport games	✗	✓	✓	✓	ENIX	ENIX
Woody Poko			✗	✓	✓	✓		dB-SOFT
The Worm in Paradise	1985	Interactive fiction	✓	✓	✓	✓	Level 9 Computing	Level 9 Computing
Worry (aka ウォーリィ)	1985	Adventure	✓	✓	✓	✓	Microcabin	Microcabin
Wrangler	1985	Arcade	✓	✓	✓	✓	Indescomp	Indescomp
The Wreck	1987	Action/Adventure	✓	✓	✓	✓	Electric Software	Electric Software
Xak: The Art of Visual Stage	1989		✗	✓	✓	✓		Micro Cabin
Xak: The Tower of Gazzel	1991		✗	✓	✓	✓		Micro Cabin
Xak II: Rising of the Redmoon	1990		✗	✓	✓	✓		Micro Cabin
Xenon	1988	Arcade	✓	✓	✓	✓	The Bitmap Brothers	Dro Soft
Xevious: Fardraut Densetsu	1988		✗	✓	✓	✓	Compile	Namco
Xider	1986	Vertical	✓	✓	✓	✓	A.G.D.	Grupo de Trabajo Software (G.T.S.)
Xybots	1989	Shoot-'em-up (All)	✓	✓	✓	✓	Domark / Tengen Inc.	Erbe Software
Xyzolog	1984		✓	✓	✓	✓	Taito	Nidecom
XZR II: Final Chapter (aka エグザイルII 完結編)	1988	Rpg	✗	✓	✓	✓	Reno	Telenet Japan
XZR: Idols of Apostate (aka エグザイル 破戒の偶像)	1988	Rpg	✗	✓	✓	✓	Reno	Telenet Japan
X・na (aka キサナ, X-na)	1990	Rpg	✗	✓	✓	✓	Fairytale	Fairytale / Apros Selon
Y'ahtzee (aka Yahtzee)	1985	Board games	✓	✓	✓	✓	DIMensionNEW	Canon
Yajiuma Pennant Race (aka やじうまペナントレース)	1989	Sport games	✗	✓	✓	✓	Cross Media Soft	Victor Co. of Japan (JVC)
Yaksa (aka ヤシャ)	1987	Action	✗	✓	✓	✓	Wolf Team	Wolf Team
Yami no ryu ou Hades no monshō (aka Crest of the Dragon King Hades of Darkness)	1986	Vertical scroller	✓	✓	✓	✓	Casio	Casio
Yaritai-Hodai the 3rd: As You Like Vol. 1 Europe (aka やりたい放題3アズユーライクVol.1ヨーロッパ編)	1990	Text and Gfx	✗	✓	✓	✓	Lucifer Soft	All Circulation
Yesod	1987	Platform	✓	✓	✓	✓	A.G.D. / Unicornio Soft	P.P.P. Ediciones
Yie Ar Kung-Fu	1985		✓	✓	✓	✓		Konami
Yie Ar Kung Fu 2	1986		✓	✓	✓	✓		Konami
Yōkai Yashiki (aka Ghost House)			✓	✓	✓	✓		Casio
Youma Kourin (aka 妖魔降臨, Ninja Dexter)	1989	Action	✗	✓	✓	✓	Falcon	Nippon Dexter
Young Sherlock - The legacy of Doyle (aka ヤングシャーロックドイルの遺産)	1987	Adventure (All)	✓	✓	✓	✓	CCS	Pack-In-Video
Youthful people playing Go (aka 一石にかける青春)	1988	Board games / Adult	✗	✓	✓	✓	Log	HARD
Ys I: Ancient Ys Vanished	1987		✗	✓	✓	✓	Falcom	Falcom
Ys II	1988		✗	✓	✓	✓	Falcom	Falcom
Ys III: Wanderers from Ys	1989		✗	✓	✓	✓	Falcom	Falcom
Yuki (aka ゆき)	1986	Quiz / Adult	✓	✓	✓	✓	Omega system	Omega system
Yumeji: Asakusa-Kitan (aka 夢二・浅草綺譚)	1992	Visual Novel	✗	✓	✓	✓	Fairytale	Fairytale
Zaider - Battle Of Peguss (aka 超戦士ザイダーバトルオブペガス)	1986	Rpg	✓	✓	✓	✓	SST	Cosmos Computer
Zakil Wood	1985	Interactive fiction	✓	✓	✓	✓	Mr. Micro	Mr. Micro
Zanac	1986	Vertical shooter	✓	✓	✓	✓	Compile	Pony
Zanac EX	1986	Vertical shooter	✗	✓	✓	✓	Compile	Pony
Zanbe House (aka ザンビハウス)	1984	Action	✓	✓	✓	✓	Soft Studio WING	Soft Studio WING
Zarth (aka ザース, Zasu)	1985	Adventure	✓	✓	✓	✓	Studio Jandora	ENIX
Zatsugaku Olympic Watanabe Wataru Edition (aka 雑学オリンピックわたなべわたる編)	1988	Quiz / Adult	✗	✓	✓	✓	HARD	HARD
Zaxxon (Electric Software)	1985	Action	✓	✓	✓	✓	SEGA	Electric Software
Zaxxon (Pony Canon)	1985	Isometric shooter	✓	✓	✓	✓	Sega	Pony Canyon
Zenji (aka ゼンジー)	1984	Puzzle	✓	✓	✓	✓	Activision	Pony Canyon
Zero Fighter (aka Dog Fighter)	1984	Vehicular combat - Aircraft	✓	✓	✓	✓	Hudson Soft	Honeybee Soft
Zeta 2000 (aka ゼータ2000, Z2000)	1985	Rpg	✓	✓	✓	✓	Pixel	Pixel / Topia
Zexas Light Speed 2000 Light Years (aka ゼクサス光速2000光年, Zexas)	1984	Shoot-'em-up (All)	✓	✓	✓	✓	dB-SOFT	dB-SOFT
Zexas Limited (aka ゼクサスリミテッド)	1985	Shoot-'em-up (All)	✓	✓	✓	✓	dB-SOFT	dB-SOFT
Zipi y Zape	1988	Adventure (All)	✓	✓	✓	✓	Dro Soft	Dro Soft
Zipper	1985	Action	✓	✓	✓	✓	D. Woods	Kuma Computers / Ace Software S.A.
Zoids: Battle of the Central Continent (aka ゾイド 中央大陸の戦い)	1988	Rpg	✗	✓	✓	✓	Tomy Company, Ltd.	Toshiba-EMI Ltd.
Zoids: The Battle Begins	1986		✗	✓	✓	✓	Electronic Pencil	Martech Games
Zombie Hunter	1989		✗	✓	✓	✓		Hi-Score Software
Zona 0	1991	Arcade	✓	✓	✓	✓	Topo Soft	Erbe Software
Zond - The Final Combat	1988	Arcade	✓	✓	✓	✓	Genesis Soft	Iber Soft
Zoo	1987		✗	✓	✓	✓		Radarsoft
Zoot	1986	Action	✓	✓	✓	✓	Bug-Byte Software	Bug-Byte Software
Zoom 909	1985		✓	✓	✓	✓		Sega
Zork I	1983	Interactive fiction	✓	✓	✓	✓	Infocom	Infocom
Zork II	1983	Interactive fiction	✓	✓	✓	✓	Infocom	Infocom
Zork III	1983	Interactive fiction	✓	✓	✓	✓	Infocom	Infocom
Zorni Exerion II (aka ゾルニ)	1984	Shoot-'em-up	✓	✓	✓	✓	Jaleco	Eaglesoft
Zukkoke yajikita onmitsudoutyuu	1987		✗	✓	✓	✓		HAL Laboratory

== See also ==
- Konami Game Master (1988)
- List of Konami games
