= Runaway: A Road Adventure =

2001 video game

- Original Spanish box
- Developer: Pendulo Studios
- Publishers: Dinamic Multimedia; FX Interactive; Tri Synergy (North America)
- Composer: David García-Morales
- Series: Runaway
- Engine: Hollywood Monsters engine
- Platforms: Windows, iOS (re-issue)
- Release: July 6, 2001: Windows; ESP: July 6, 2001; RUS: August 2002; GER: November 18, 2002; CZE: December 2002; FRA: March 21, 2003; ITA: May 2003; NA: August 20, 2003 iOS June 2013
- Genre: Graphic adventure
- Mode: Single-player

Runaway: A Road Adventure is a 2001 graphic adventure game developed by the Spanish company Pendulo Studios and published by Dinamic Multimedia. It follows the story of Brian Basco, an American college student on the run after he unwittingly saves a murder witness named Gina Timmins from assassination by the New York Mafia. Searching for clues about a mysterious crucifix linked to the murder, Brian and Gina embark on a cross-country journey through the United States while pursued by two Mafia hitmen. The player assumes the role of Brian and explores the game world while collecting items, solving puzzles and conversing with non-player characters.

Inspired by the road movie genre and films such as Pulp Fiction and Raising Arizona, Pendulo Studios began Runaway in 1998. The team abandoned the nonlinear and parodical nature of its previous title, Hollywood Monsters, in favor of a more straightforward and adult-oriented approach that blended humor with drama. Runaway initially featured hand-drawn 2D graphics; production problems necessitated a switch, one year into development, to pre-rendered 3D characters with toon shading. The change caused major delays, exacerbated by a shortage of qualified character animators in Spain: the country's recovering game industry had a limited talent pool. Runaway's small core team of nine members was supported by part-timers and freelancers during development.

Runaway was highly anticipated in Spain, and it won awards and positive reviews upon its July 2001 release. Early domestic sales were strong, but Runaway's distribution and international debut were scuttled when Dinamic Multimedia closed that September. Forced to downsize in response, Pendulo fought for roughly one year to buy back Runaway's rights; the developer finally secured global publishing deals during 2002 and 2003. DTP Entertainment and Focus Home Interactive had significant success with Runaway in Germany and France, respectively, and the game sold 600,000 units across Europe by 2006. Runaway was well-received by German publications such as PC Games, and a panel of journalists and industry figures in France named it one of 2003's best titles. Reviews in the United States were mixed.

As Pendulo's first international hit, Runaway financially revitalized its developer. Pendulo built on the game's design and visual style in future projects, and became Spain's longest-running game developer by 2019. Although adventure games were in decline before Runaway's global release, publications in Germany, France and Spain reported that the game helped to reenergize its genre. Runaway has been named one of the best Spanish games and best adventure games of all time, but also cited as a polarizing title; in Germany, it inspired the popular term "Runaway Syndrome" to denote poor adventure game design. The game spawned two sequels—Runaway 2: The Dream of the Turtle (2006) and Runaway: A Twist of Fate (2009)—and formed a series that sold over 1.5 million units worldwide by 2010. Hidden Runaway, a spin-off, followed in 2012.

== Gameplay ==
Brian Basco stands near the character Oscar. The player has moused over a business sign, turning the cursor into a magnifying glass.

Runaway: A Road Adventure is a graphic adventure game controlled with a point-and-click interface, in a style that has been compared to LucasArts adventure games. Using a mouse, the player navigates the player character through the game world and interacts with hotspots, such as items and non-player characters. Interaction with hotspots is context-sensitive. For example, if the cursor transforms into a magnifying glass while hovering over a hotspot, the player may click to learn more about the object highlighted. When the cursor transforms into a hand or speech balloon, it indicates that a hotspot may be manipulated or spoken to, respectively.

To progress in Runaway, the player gathers items, solves puzzles and converses with non-player characters; the game contains no action-based or time-limited sequences. Most puzzles involve the use of items, which are stored in an inventory subscreen. Items are often hidden in the game world and sometimes require pixel hunting to locate, and certain items may only be found by examining the same hotspot multiple times. The player must occasionally combine items in the inventory to solve puzzles. Conversations, handled by picking dialogue options from a menu, provide puzzle hints and other assistance.

Runaway's player character is unable to die, and progression is linear. The game follows a system in which the player character refuses to collect certain items before their use is made clear in the plot. As a result, the player must solve many puzzles in a specific order. When the player progresses enough, a cutscene will play to provide information and to further the plot.

== Story ==
In New York City, the college student Brian Basco prepares for a cross-country road trip to his new school, the University of California, Berkeley. Before he can drive out of the city, he collides with a woman named Gina Timmins who runs in front of his car, and Brian delivers her to a hospital. Gina tells Brian that she is a lounge singer, and that her father, a government employee, had just given her an ancient and mysterious crucifix for safekeeping. Made men from the Sandretti crime family, Gustav and Feodor, had then kidnapped him and demanded information about the artifact as she had watched in secret. The thugs had unintentionally killed him, causing Gina to reveal her presence and be chased into the street; Brian had unwittingly saved her life by hitting her. Gina finishes her story and succumbs to sedatives administered by the hospital staff. Intrigued, Brian decides to help her evade the Mafia, and he outwits a Sandretti hitman who arrives to murder her. After Brian starts a fire in Gina's room, the two flee to a museum in Chicago, where Brian believes that his archaeologist friend Clive can tell them more about the crucifix. As they arrive, a Mafia informant outside the museum alerts Gustav and Feodor.

Clive listens to Brian and Gina's story with concern, and Brian gets Dr. Susan Olivaw, a restorer, to prepare the crucifix for identification. He ultimately uses the museum's database to determine that the object is of Hopi origin. Clive then calls Brian out of the database room with a warning that Gina is in danger. As he exits, Brian is knocked out by Gustav and Feodor, who had offered to let Clive live in exchange for Gina and Brian. Nevertheless, Gustav and Feodor kill Clive and leave with the two captives, whom they transport to a remote cabin in the desert. Brian is interrogated and beaten unconscious, and awakens to find himself alone, as the gangsters have taken Gina to a separate room for questioning. Managing to escape, Brian stumbles upon three drag queens who were abandoned in a broken-down tour bus by their manager. They agree to help Brian save Gina if he helps them escape the desert. Aided by the drag queens, Brian tricks Gustav and Feodor into leaving their cabin, which allows him to enter and rescue Gina. One of the drag queens, revealed to be ex-military, hijacks the gangsters' helicopter as an escape vehicle for the group. The drag queens fly Brian and Gina to Arizona's Hopi region before departing.

As Brian and Gina search for clues about the crucifix, Gina falls and appears to die in a hole near an abandoned mine shaft. Brian is distraught and nearly quits the mission until a mysterious Hopi man appears. Claiming to be the last Hopi chieftain, the man reveals to Brian that the crucifix is a key that opens a sacred, secret Hopi crypt, which lies near a Hopi village beyond the abandoned mine. As the mine is blocked by large boulder and Brian lacks supplies, he is forced to explore the surrounding area. He soon meets Sushi Douglas, a computer hacker; and Oscar, a strong man with a troubled past, who now works for the local folk healer Mama Dorita. Oscar helps Brian remove the boulder at the mine's entrance, and Brian travels through it to reach the abandoned Hopi village. There, he finds Gina alive, although her leg is broken. Brian proceeds to unlock the sacred Hopi crypt and, inside, to once again encounter the Hopi man, who gives him a human finger preserved in a jar of formaldehyde. The man tells Brian that the jar had been placed there sacrilegiously by a now-dead Hopi descendant. Brian and Gina return to Mama Dorita to mend Gina's broken leg, and Brian chooses to employ the healer's services to contact the dead man—whom he believes to be Gina's father—via a séance. Brian serves as a medium and is possessed.

During the séance, Gina speaks to the spirit of a man named Johnny "the Indian", a former member of the Sandretti family, about a large sum of money he had hidden. The spirit refuses to reveal its location. After the séance, Gina admits to Brian that she had lied: she is not a singer but a stripper, and the man she had seen die was actually Johnny. The gangster had offered to run away with her and a $20 million sum he had stolen and hidden from the Sandretti family; after his death, his crucifix-shaped key was her only clue to the money's whereabouts. Brian is hurt by these revelations but decides to help. He learns with Sushi's assistance that Johnny had used his own sister, a nun, to store the money in a bank accessible only via fingerprint scanner. Johnny had then murdered her and preserved her finger as a key. Although Gustav and Feodor soon close in on Brian and Gina's location, Oscar successfully detains the gangsters. Sushi frames Gustav and Feodor via a phone call with the Sandrettis' don, who is led to believe that his men had stolen Johnny's money for themselves and killed Gina and Brian. Afterward, the gangsters are murdered by the Sandretti family, while Brian and Gina successfully withdraw the money from the bank. Brian initially resolves to return to school, leaving Gina and the money behind, but he changes his mind at the last minute and runs away with her to the tropics.

== Development ==
=== Concept and design ===
Following Pendulo Studios' release of Hollywood Monsters in December 1997, the developer started to create a sequel to the game. The first installment had been a commercial hit in Spain, Pendulo's home country. However, Kai Fiebig of Hollywood Monsters' publisher, Dinamic Multimedia, explained that Pendulo soon revamped its project. At a meeting to assess the sequel, one of Pendulo's leads suggested a change in direction because of a thriller film he had recently seen, and the core concept for Runaway was born. Art director Rafael Latiegui later said that "the first sketches of what would end up becoming Runaway" were created in summer 1998. The team devised a story based on the road movie genre; early influence was derived from the films Pulp Fiction and Raising Arizona. Pendulo's desire to create a more tightly structured game than Hollywood Monsters inspired Runaway's chase-themed plot. For the setting, the team picked the United States over Spain for the recognizability of its locations to a global audience, and for its greater suitedness to the road movie format. Latiegui's recent trip to New Mexico and Arizona influenced the team: he had taken several hundred photographs, which guided Runaway's color palette and served as the basis for many in-game locations.

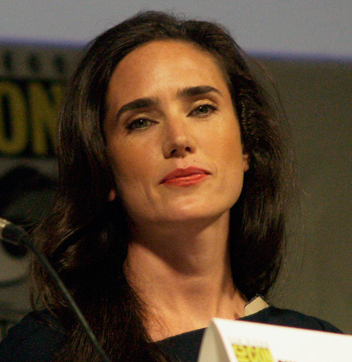
In creating the design for Gina, Pendulo Studios was influenced in part by the actress Jennifer Connelly.

According to Latiegui, Runaway's story was intended to be "more adult" and "less zany" than that of Hollywood Monsters. While Pendulo's previous game had been a parodical comedy, the team sought to give Runaway a balance of humor and drama. Gerard Masnou of GameLive PC noted Pendulo's addition of violence, strong language (including "joder") and sexual themes to the game's Spanish script, which contributed to its rating of +18 in Spain. Latiegui said that Runaway's transgressive elements—such as the appearance of drug use, stripping and drag queens—were not for the purpose of controversy, but that they nevertheless alienated certain publishers. In designing the protagonists, the team conceived Brian as a nerd whose look and personality would evolve because of his adventures in Runaway, while Gina was intended to drive the plot. Her design was particularly inspired by actresses Natalia Estrada and Jennifer Connelly. Latiegui explained that the team's goal was to make Gina "really sexy" and "especially exuberant"; her character design proved to be a greater challenge than Brian's, and she underwent several redesigns before her model sheet was finalized.

In 2000, Latiegui cited films as a greater inspiration than competing adventure games for Runaway. Pendulo's staff self-described as a group of "movie fanatics", and project manager Ramón Hernáez said that he had initially wanted to become a filmmaker rather than a game developer. The team purposely included references to films throughout Runaway, such as borrowed names and pastiches of famous scenes. Hernáez, who was responsible for outlining much of Runaway's script and scenario, added the majority of these references. Among them are nods to Close Encounters of the Third Kind, The Great Escape and Perdita Durango. The Adventures of Priscilla, Queen of the Desert was another prominent influence. Despite the impact of Pulp Fiction and Raising Arizona on the script, Hernáez noted that the two films were not among his personal favorites. He compensated by including allusions to The Apartment, The Quiet Man and the work of Woody Allen—particularly Manhattan Murder Mystery, which supplied the conceit for the game's ending. According to Hernáez, the team added few personal references to Runaway beyond the names of two hackers mentioned by Sushi, who were named after Hernáez's nieces.

Runaway was co-designed by Latiegui, Hernáez and lead programmer Felipe Gómez Pinilla, Pendulo's co-founders. They hoped to mimic the design of "classical" adventure games, particularly The Secret of Monkey Island and Monkey Island 2: LeChuck's Revenge. Both LucasArts adventure games and the early work of Sierra On-Line influenced the game. From the start, Pendulo tried to move away from the nonlinear design style used in Hollywood Monsters, in favor of what Latiegui called a more straightforward and "less scattered" linear format. Pendulo later opined that Hollywood Monsters' openness had often led to "stagnation" for players. Instead, the team divided Runaway into discrete chapters, and sought to give the game a clear difficulty curve that inclined gradually. According to Latiegui, Pendulo's primary goal with the puzzles was simply to avoid players' "feel[ing] frustrated or stuck at any time." For the interface, the designers chose a traditional point-and-click setup, as they found the style more intuitive than direct character control. Reflex-based action scenes were planned, but Pendulo rejected the idea after testers judged them disruptive to the overall experience. The team also sought to limit the game's use of dialogue trees, as Pendulo believed them to be unpopular with players.

=== Production ===
Runaway was Pendulo's largest project to date, and Gerard Masnou wrote that it "was the most ambitious graphic adventure ever developed in Spain" at the time. The game's funding was derived entirely from Spanish investments. During production, Pendulo stated that Spain's game industry had improved since its low point in the 1990s, although it was "very far from living a golden age." According to Joan Font of GameLive PC, the industry still suffered from a dearth of professional talent while Runaway was in development. Spain's education system lacked courses for game development, and the country's existing industry professionals often migrated to foreign companies for better working conditions and pay. As a result, most of Pendulo's staff on Runaway consisted of autodidacts who learned in part on the job. Felipe Gómez Pinilla said that the company asked prospective collaborators "to have a classic drawing or animation foundation and to master the programs they will be using." The game's team was small: Rafael Latiegui said that Runaway had nine core members during most of its creation, assisted by a series of part-timers on elements such as music. Programming was almost exclusively a solo effort by Pinilla. The company also relied on external contractors for certain key tasks. Despite the industry's limited workforce, Ramón Hernáez said that Pendulo had a "relatively" easy time finding talent.

The soundtrack for Runaway was composed by freelancer David García-Morales, who had previously worked for Pyro Studios on the music to Commandos: Behind Enemy Lines. He sought to give each of Runaway's areas a unique theme suited to its environs, while ensuring that the tracks "had some connection to each other, whether of harmony, melody or rhythmic drums". García-Morales later said that this balance of unity and difference was difficult. Pendulo's proprietary adaptive music engine, the MIP Music System, was used to alter the soundtrack based on in-game events. In addition to the game's background music, Pendulo decided "from the very outset" to give Runaway a signature theme song, according to Latiegui. The goal was to increase the game's similarity to films via the inclusion of music with lyrics. Pendulo picked a stylistic direction for the sung tracks and began to explore demo tapes from interested bands; Latiegui said that the team "by chance" encountered a tape from the musical act Liquor, sent in by García-Morales. Singer Vera Domínguez caught Pendulo's attention, which led to Liquor's selection. Writing for Micromanía, J. A. Pascual compared the band's resultant work for Runaway to the output of The Cranberries. García-Morales hoped to raise Liquor's profile with the opportunity, as he was personally invested in the band's success.

Runaway began development with fully 2D graphics. After Pendulo Studios encountered major problems with the animation, the company reworked the game with pre-rendered 3D models.

Like Hollywood Monsters and Pendulo's earlier Igor: Objective Uikokahonia, Runaway began development with completely 2D graphics. The game maintained this style for a full year and to a "very advanced" stage of production, according to the Spanish press. Most of the 2D artwork was created by outside contractors under Pendulo's supervision. Publisher Dinamic Multimedia publicly revealed Runaway in 2D form during mid-1999; Micromanía reported that the game looked like an "authentic animated film". One of that magazine's columnists called the game's 2D visuals ready to "compete, side by side, with the greatest successes of LucasArts." Although Pendulo completed the entire first chapter of Runaway in 2D, animation proved to be a major challenge for the team, especially when it came to the game's characters. It was expensive and slow to produce; Latiegui later recalled that "you wanted to have a cel in three days and instead ... it took three weeks" to achieve the intended quality. The animators struggled to keep their art on-model. Latiegui said in 2007, "When I see those drawings I still laugh because they are very curious". As a result, the team deemed Runaway's 2D graphics unworkable.

Hoping to find a solution, Pendulo began to experiment with modeling the characters in polygonal 3D. As the team disliked realistic 3D art styles, it was initially a struggle to find a suitable look, and to match the 3D characters to the existing 2D backgrounds. Pendulo sought to make Runaway's visuals reminiscent of comic books: Latiegui noted that he had grown up with Spanish comics such as El Víbora, Totem and Cimoc. The company also used artists Adam Hughes and Richard Corben as reference points. These considerations led Pendulo to choose a non-photorealistic rendering style never previously used by an adventure game. Pendulo pre-rendered the 3D character models to create sprites and then added more effects on top, such as real-time lighting and hand-drawn tweaks. To integrate items into the world, the team created versions of the background visuals both with and without items; the game switches between these images when an item is placed or removed. Latiegui later said that the team was "surprised that, yes, [it] could do something decent" in 3D. Dinamic's Alberto Hernandez wrote that the publisher was won over by "the first tests".

The contractors responsible for the 2D visuals were subsequently let go; instead, Pendulo staffed up with a new group of full-time artists. Pendulo proceeded to scrap all of the 2D animated character art, and to recreate the game's cast in 3D, based on the existing character designs. The finished first chapter was then remade in the new style. To achieve Runaway's final look, the team used a combination of proprietary and third-party software. Pascual wrote that Pendulo "used the same procedure" employed by then-recent animated properties, such as The Iron Giant and Futurama, that similarly blended 2D and 3D artwork. Runaway's graphical overhaul did not require a rewrite of the existing game engine, which was an upgraded version of the Hollywood Monsters engine designed to feature full-scene anti-aliasing and a 1024 × 768 display resolution. Latiegui called support for this higher resolution "logical" given the team's heavy focus on visuals, the element of Runaway with which Pendulo was happiest. The new style was nevertheless both challenging and time-consuming to create, and Latiegui noted that the team was "trapped by the limitations of 2D and those of 3D all at once." Pendulo struggled to find enough qualified 3D character animators in Spain, according to Micromanía's Francisco Delgado, and Hernáez wrote that the quality of the facial animation ultimately fell below his hopes.

Runaway's visual overhaul resulted in major delays. Originally due in early 2000, the game entered a protracted development cycle and was for a time without an official release date, which led to rumors throughout 2000 about the game's status. Although it was projected by that August for a late-2000 release, and was reportedly "90% complete" by October, the game proceeded to miss its planned December 2000 launch. Adventure Gamers' Eivind Hagerup wrote that Pendulo "didn't want to rush the game before Christmas, because this would lower the quality of the game." While Dinamic subsequently rescheduled Runaway for mid-January 2001, the game encountered another string of delays through the first half of 2001, which Dinamic attributed to "technical problems" and the discovery of major software bugs. In his column for GameLive PC, Masnou wrote at the time that Runaway's lengthy development and numerous delays were worrying signs, and warned the creators to "release this game before we get tired of waiting and we just forget about it." Hernáez noted that the team was unhappy with the slow pace of development, as it increased costs and devalued the final product. Pre-release praise for Runaway was nevertheless high, growing as the development time extended. In early 2001, Alexander García of MeriStation reported that Runaway had become one of Spain's "most anticipated graphic adventures".

As Runaway's production progressed through 2001, Dinamic fell into financial turmoil. The publisher's ventures related to the dot-com bubble—such as the massively multiplayer online role-playing game La Prisión—had proven unsuccessful, and Dinamic was caught in the global dot-com collapse. By early March, rumors had spread that Dinamic was in danger of closing. The company responded that only its online division was being shuttered, and that Runaway and its other traditional games were not in jeopardy. However, key faculty secretly departed Dinamic to join Pyro Studios during the period, and Dinamic entered receivership and cut 39 jobs in late March. Dinamic owed a significant debt of 1.5 billion pesetas to multiple creditors by this time. In response to these issues, Dinamic pushed Pendulo to rush Runaway's release "because it needed money to stay afloat", according to Pinilla. He noted that the last months of the game's development were difficult, and he complained that Dinamic "did not provide the necessary funds for a sufficient number of people" to complete the project. While Runaway ultimately went gold on June 25, 2001, its final version contained serious bugs that required several patches. Pendulo reported that most of these bugs occurred for users with 15-bit video cards, and took steps to address this issue.

== Distribution and sales ==
=== Debut and turmoil ===
Dinamic Multimedia published Runaway in Spain on July 6, 2001. Shipped on three CD-ROMs and at Dinamic's standard list price of 3,995 pesetas, the game proceeded to sell well in Spain during its initial months. It was the country's fourth best-selling computer game in August; GameSpot Spain reported that the title had accrued "healthy sales" by that time. It claimed 22nd on the charts the following month. However, the game soon encountered problems. On September 24, Dinamic announced its liquidation, following its financial upheaval earlier in the year. Although certain commentators had speculated that Runaway's sales would save the publisher, it was ultimately Dinamic's last published title. At the time, VNUNet reported Dinamic's closure as "bad news ... for the battered Spanish game software industry". A writer for MarcaPlayer later called it "probably the most traumatic event that the Spanish video game industry has experienced in history". This situation hurt Runaway's distribution and commercial performance in Spain. In retrospect, Rafael Latiegui said that it had the effect of "blocking" domestic sales, and Gerard Masnou remarked that the game went "almost unnoticed" because of Dinamic's closure. By GfK's measurements, Dinamic's release of Runaway totaled 8,980 units sold domestically.

According to Felipe Gómez Pinilla, Spanish adventure game developers relied on international sales to reach profitability, as the domestic market was too small to cover their costs. None of Pendulo's earlier titles had achieved international success, and Masnou called it a rarity for any Spanish adventure game, but the team felt that Runaway might break the trend. An English localization of Runaway was initially announced for a simultaneous launch with the Spanish edition, while Italian and German releases were inked for fall 2001. However, Dinamic's downfall cast doubt on the future of Runaway outside Spain. Latiegui remarked after Dinamic's closure that, unless a deal to repurchase the game's rights emerged "very quickly", Pendulo could follow its publisher into bankruptcy. By mid-October 2001, all international versions of Runaway were placed on hold. Dubbing had not yet begun for the German edition by that time. Pendulo proceeded to undertake lawsuits and engage the publisher in a legal battle for the rights, a process that lasted roughly one year. Adventure Gamers' Marek Bronstring wrote that the game was "caught in limbo" during this time; Pendulo struggled to stay solvent. Latiegui later called the period an extreme challenge, and the company had to lay off the majority of its staff to make payroll. By November 2001, negotiations to release the game in Germany were ongoing and a fan petition to save Runaway had begun.

=== International breakthrough ===
Pendulo Studios finally secured the rights to Runaway in July 2002. The game appeared in Russia, published by Russobit-M, in early August. Later that month, Pendulo announced that the German-language edition of Runaway had been revived. Its publisher was revealed as DTP Entertainment in early September, by which time the game was set for a November launch across the German market: Germany, Switzerland and Austria. The German translation had been completed and its dubbing work started by mid-September. Retailer pre-orders in the German market quickly surpassed DTP's forecasts. For the Czech edition, Pendulo signed with TOP Distributor, the publisher that Dinamic Multimedia had originally contracted to bring Runaway to the Czech Republic. Pendulo and TOP began their translation effort before the rights issue was resolved, via an under-the-table agreement, and the publisher received its first Czech-language beta edition in June 2002. The Czech translation took four months; dubbing was completed in October. Runaway's German and Czech versions both went gold in November, and releases followed on November 18 and in early December, respectively.

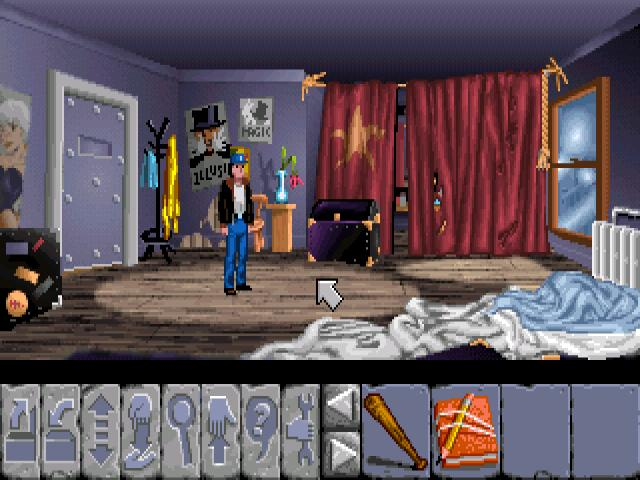
DTP Entertainment and Focus Home Interactive characterized Runaway as a revival of traditional graphic adventure games—like the earlier Flight of the Amazon Queen (pictured)—that were seen at the time as a declining genre in countries such as France and Germany.

DTP Entertainment supported Runaway in Germany with a heavy marketing campaign that characterized the game as "the return of the classic adventure", according to the publisher's Chris Kellner. At the time, adventure games were perceived in countries such as Germany and France as a declining genre. Runaway debuted at #9 on GfK's weekly computer game sales charts for the German market, and spent five consecutive months in Media Control's top 30. The game's sales in the German market surpassed 50,000 units within a year, ultimately climbing to 60,000. Kellner declared it "a huge success" for the publisher. Following Runaway's debut in Germany, Pendulo landed deals in December 2002 to release the game in three more countries: France, with Focus Home Interactive; Poland, with TopWare Interactive; and the United Kingdom, with GMX Media. All three were slated for spring 2003. Like DTP, Focus Home publicly labeled Runaway "the return" of traditional graphic adventure games. The company's Cédric Lagarrigue later said that his team had "a huge desire to revive" the genre, and that they believed Runaway could do so.

Runaway's worldwide spread continued throughout the early part of 2003. By February, Pendulo had signed contracts with Comgame 576 and FX Interactive to ship the game in Hungary and Italy, respectively. Agreements emerged in March to localize Runaway in the Netherlands, Belgium and North America—the third through Tri Synergy. In France, Focus Home backed the game with a large financial investment in hopes of securing a hit. Two members of the firm Words of Magic oversaw the French translation and dub, which included the French voice actors for Cameron Diaz, Tom Cruise and Will Smith. Words of Magic finished the localization within two months, in the process adding jokes and references specific to France, alongside new hints for certain puzzles. Runaway appeared in France on March 21. Initial sales were strong: the game reached #3 on GfK's French charts, and it remained in the top 20 through July. Runaway ultimately maintained a six-month streak on GfK's list. Similarly, Fnac reported Runaway as its third best-selling game across all platforms during April's first half, and it continued to chart in the store's top 30 through the end of May. In August, Lagarrigue called Runaway a major hit for his company.

While securing these international deals, Pendulo worked in late 2002 and early 2003 on a remastered Spanish version of Runaway, this time published by FX Interactive. In early 2002, the two companies had collaborated on a re-release of Hollywood Monsters. Changes to the remastered Runaway included a new box cover by Luis Royo, increased video quality, added hints for difficult puzzles, a new voice-over for Gina—redubbed by the actress who voiced Angelina Jolie in Spain—and other updates. Pendulo and FX announced the remastered version in January 2003. Latiegui stated that the new edition's "most important" function was to solve Runaway's ongoing supply shortage in Spain, caused by Dinamic's closure. The remaster was soon confirmed as a part of El Mundo's 2003 "Los Mejores Videojuegos del Mundo" (MVM) collection, games that the newspaper included with its Sunday edition as optional purchases for €5 each. Hollywood Monsters had been included in the successful 2002 collection. Set for release in mid-March 2003, Runaway's MVM edition became a hit and sold 100,000 units over the weekend.

While the remaster was initially exclusive to El Mundo's MVM collection, FX Interactive chose to reissue it as part of the publisher's "Premium" budget line in mid-2003. The company followed this SKU later in 2003 with the "Multiadventure" bundle, which paired Runaway with the titles Traitors Gate and The Longest Journey. FX brought Runaway to Italy in May; Latiegui characterized its early performance in the country as a "great success". Pendulo also revealed a deal that month to localize the title in Norway, Sweden and Denmark. Later in the year, Focus Home announced a French relaunch of Runaway in a Collector's Edition bundle, supported by a renewed marketing campaign. This new edition appeared in early October. Despite Runaway's popularity in continental Europe, the title's English edition struggled to reach shelves. Evan Dickens of Adventure Gamers wrote that "the game stubbornly refused to find its way to an English translation". GMX Media's localization in the United Kingdom was beset by delays as 2003 progressed, and it ultimately failed to materialize. Tri Synergy's North American version remained without a scheduled release date by the middle of that year. It finally launched in the United States on August 20.

By January 2004, Runaway had become an international commercial hit. At the time, MCV's Frank Mischkowski wrote that its sales totaled 400,000 units at full price and in Europe alone. Ramón Hernáez noted that the game's "sales are not explosive, [but] they add up" over time. Runaway's largest markets were France and Germany, according to Latiegui. He added that it had not "done badly at all" in the United States by February 2004, where its lifetime sales at brick-and-mortar retailers reached 12,928 units by the end of the month. Conversely, Richard Moss of Ars Technica later wrote that Runaway was one of many adventure games that "barely made a mark in the US but sold well in Europe" during the late 1990s and the 2000s. Runaway accrued roughly 500,000 global sales by March 2004, and remained DTP's best-selling adventure game by that September. In May 2006, GamesRadar+ reported that Runaway had totaled 600,000 sales in Europe. The game and its sequel, Runaway 2: The Dream of the Turtle, together had sold one million copies by April 2009. Of these sales, France accounted for 250,000 units.

== Reception ==
=== Spanish press ===
Reception

Review scores
Publication	Score
Micromanía	90/100
MeriStation	8.5/10
GameLive PC	8.5/10
PC Actual	8.4/10
PC Manía	7/10

Runaway garnered positive reviews from Spanish outlets such as Micromanía, MeriStation and GameLive PC, while PC Actual declared it the "Game of the Month". It came in third place for GameLive PC's 2000–2001 "Best Adventure Game" prize; the editors called Runaway "an adult game, intelligent, very well structured and rich in the kinds of details that separate good craftsmanship from the rest." In MeriStation's 2001 EME awards, Runaway received 14.1% of the reader vote in the "Best Adventure Game" category, which placed it third behind Silent Hill 2 and Shenmue 2.

Micromanía's J. A. Pascual called Runaway "excellent", arguing that it recaptured the spirit of LucasArts-style adventure games and disproved the prevailing wisdom that traditional adventure games were dying. Gerard Masnou of GameLive PC and the reviewer for PC Actual similarly described Runaway as a bright spot for its genre; Masnou wrote that adventure game players "have a new classic to hold on to" following "a few years of drifting". PC Actual's writer went further and hailed the game as evidence, alongside releases like Commandos 2: Men of Courage and Severance: Blade of Darkness, that high-quality Spanish game development in general was resurging. Alberto de Vega Luna of MeriStation continued the praise for Runaway: he found it to be a rare highlight for 2D adventure games, a genre "that unfortunately is disappearing from the market." However, he felt that the game was held back from "essential" status by severe bugs at launch, which he cited as "without any doubt" Runaway's greatest flaw.

Pascual found the puzzles in Runaway to be well-balanced and "perfectly logical". Luna and Masnou concurred on the puzzles' quality, although they declared them somewhat too easy. All three writers lauded Runaway's visual presentation, and PC Actual's critic joined in complimenting the graphics both technically and artistically. While PC Manía echoed the praise for the "spectacular" presentation, the magazine's reviewer argued that Runaway's principal character designs were overly similar to those of the Broken Sword series. Masnou likewise criticized this aspect of Pendulo's game: he wrote that "it looks too much like Broken Sword", a problem that touched "its premise and ... its style of gameplay". In his view, it was among Runaway's primary downsides, alongside a general lack of innovation. Pascual cited the Broken Sword similarities as a positive, since he felt that Runaway's design "melt[s] the essence" of its influences together and generates "its own personality" with the result. Despite these comparisons to Broken Sword, the reviewers for Micromanía, GameLive PC and PC Manía all enjoyed Runaway's story. The third magazine's critic ultimately summarized Runaway as a "good title for everyone addicted to graphic adventures and, of course, for those who are just starting."

=== International reviews ===
Reception

Aggregate score
Aggregator	Score
Metacritic	74/100

Review scores
Publication	Score
Computer Gaming World	2/5 stars
Game Informer	7.25/10; 7/10
GameSpot	7.5/10
GameStar	84/100
Jeuxvideo.com	18/20
Joystick	5/10
PC Gamer (US)	51%
PC Games (DE)	83/100
PC Action	86%
Clubic	5/5 stars

In France, Runaway was named one of the four best computer games of 2003 at the Digital Awards, part of the Euro Cyber Games. Judging was handled by a panel that included representatives from SELL and the Association des producteurs d'œuvres multimédia (APOM), alongside journalists such as Daniel Ichbiah and Le Figaro's Sébastien Lubrano. The French websites Jeuxvideo.com and Clubic praised Runaway's story, characters, music, visuals, puzzles and French localization; Clubic's writer also noted the game's humor as a high point. Critics from both outlets dubbed Runaway a savior of traditional adventure games, although they faulted its "pixelated" and sometimes stiffly-animated cutscenes. Conversely, despite echoing Clubic and Jeuxvideo.com on the "classy" visuals and "excellent" score, the writer for France's Joystick summarized Runaway as a failure. Breaking with the others, he found the script middling and lambasted the game design as "execrable": for him, the puzzles amounted to "boring stupidity" with numerous illogical leaps.

Among German players, Runaway claimed a 97% recommendation rate in PC Games' reader polls. According to the magazine, the graphics and story were widely lauded by the public, although the game was criticized for its brevity. German critic Georg Valtin of GameStar offered Runaway a positive review, while PC Games' David Bergmann and PC Action's Tanja Bunke declared it superior to Grim Fandango. All three writers praised Runaway's story, humor and visuals, and cited the game as a return to form for its genre. The three similarly enjoyed the game's puzzle design, despite Bergmann's dislike for its "frustrating" pixel hunts and Valtin's criticism that certain puzzles require "guessing". Joining Jeuxvideo.com and Clubic, Bergmann also docked Runaway points for its "pixelated, blurry" cutscene sequences. Nevertheless, discussing the German localization effort, both Bergmann and Valtin offered strong praise. Summarizing the game, Bunke hailed it as "the current non plus ultra of adventure games", and Bergmann wrote that it was "undoubtedly the best adventure of the year 2002."

Runaway met with a "love-it-or-hate-it reaction upon its English release", according to Jack Allin of Adventure Gamers. The game's reception was "mixed or average" among the outlets surveyed by Metacritic. It was panned by Computer Gaming World, whose Dana Jongewaard dismissed Runaway as the "bimbo of graphic adventure games: both pretty and stupid." Despite praising its visuals and finding its voice acting and storyline adequate, she condemned the "maddening frustration" and repetition of its puzzles. Chuck Osborn of PC Gamer US followed Jongewaard on Runaway's graphics and puzzle logic, but broke with her on the plot and voice acting, the latter of which he called one of the game's worst elements. Declaring Runaway "a who's-who of point-and-click adventure-game pitfalls", Osborn denounced its use of stereotypes such as "a Japanese caricature right out of a WWII-era Bugs Bunny cartoon". Both writers warned all but the biggest adventure game fans to "run away" from Runaway. By contrast, Game Informer and GameSpot characterized Runaway as a "solid", if flawed, entry in its genre. GameSpot's Brad Shoemaker liked the story and called the visuals "a treat", but deemed the puzzles, voice acting and humor uneven. Game Informer's Lisa Mason similarly highlighted the "stylish, clean, and fresh" visuals, and found the characters to be "great". However, with Shoemaker, she disliked the unevenness of the puzzles and voice acting. Jeremy Zoss of Game Informer summarized, "It's no Day of the Tentacle, but it'll do", a sentiment echoed by Shoemaker.

== Legacy ==
Pendulo Studios stopped creating games after Dinamic Multimedia's closure, but Rafael Latiegui said in early 2003 that the developer could recover if Runaway sold well enough. He noted that Pendulo "never stopped having development ideas so ... everything depends on the sales of Runaway". The game's hit status in Europe ultimately revived the company, and Felipe Gómez Pinilla dubbed Runaway "a turning point for" Pendulo. It was Pendulo's global breakthrough; a writer for MeriStation called it "one of the most discussed and beloved graphic adventures by adventurers around the world." In 2018, MeriStation reported that the Runaway series remained one of the most famous Spanish game products in the European Union. Runaway's success enabled Pendulo to rehire most of its layoffs from the Dinamic turmoil, and Pendulo proceeded to become Spain's longest-running game developer by 2019. It has been named a major force in Spanish games, particularly in the adventure genre. In 2015, researchers Víctor Manuel Martínez and Manuel Garin cited Runaway as the start of Pendulo's own brand of adventure games. Pendulo's Josué Monchan similarly said that the company "found [its] voice" with the project. Its later games reused Runaway's cartoonish aesthetic, which MarcaPlayer deemed a Pendulo "hallmark" by 2011.

"Brian Basco's first adventure, while not without its shortcomings, showed that it was still possible for adventure games to be commercially successful, undoubtedly playing its part in convincing publishers and developers that our favorite genre had a future."

— Benjamin Braun, Adventure Gamers

Runaway's popularity, during a period of decline for traditional adventure games, became evidence in the game industry that the genre could still succeed. Jack Allin of Adventure Gamers wrote in 2012 that Runaway "was cited as one of the games that helped catapult the genre back into an era of relative prominence." Martin Ganteföhr of House of Tales called it "practically impossible" to interest publishers in adventure games during the early 2000s, but he argued that "charming titles like Runaway ... recaptured many hearts and minds." In France, Nicolas Magnier of Gaming-Side offered a similar account. The Hamburg Chamber of Commerce's Hamburger Wirtschaft magazine reported that Runaway revived its genre "overnight", while a writer for Jeuxvideo.com stated that it "marked the rebirth of the genre." Other publications to cite Runaway as a contributor to the reenergization of adventure games include La Libre Belgique, Gameblog, GameStar, PC Games and MeriStation. The game's success inspired DTP Entertainment to reorient its business around adventure games.

In 2012, MeriStation's César Otero called Runaway "one of the games alongside Commandos that ... [made] it clear that Spain still possesses the talent that made us great between 1983 and 1992." Runaway has been listed as one of Spain's best games by HobbyConsolas, IGN España, GQ España, 20 minutos and Yoigo's Bloygo. Defconplay likewise cited Runaway, together with its sequels, as one of Spain's five best games. Weighing Runaway's place globally, Gameblog, IGN España and Xataka named it one of the best adventure games ever. At the same time, writers for Adventure Gamers and Hardcore Gaming 101 have characterized Runaway as abnormally polarizing. Kurt Kalata of the latter publication wrote that "many proclaimed the cartoonish adventure to be a return to form ... [but o]thers found it a harrowingly shallow experience". John Walker of Rock, Paper, Shotgun recalled it as "remarkably charmless, and sometimes even offensively so." Kalata was similarly critical. In Germany, Runaway inspired the popular term "Runaway Syndrome" to denote frustrating adventure game design. Adventure Gamers and Retro Gamer Germany have defined Runaway Syndrome as the need to examine a hotspot multiple times to acquire an item. Other sources define it as the player character's refusal to perform actions before their purpose in the plot is clear.

In February 2009, Focus Home Interactive re-released Runaway on GOG.com, and a GameTap version followed that June. A launch through DotEmu arrived in September 2010. Runaway had appeared on Valve's Steam platform by the following year. In May 2013, Pendulo and publisher Bulkypix announced a partnership to port Runaway to iOS, with a revamped interface to accommodate touch controls. The Runaway port was one of several iOS re-releases by Pendulo during the period, in an effort to keep the company solvent after other avenues of funding had closed. Josué Monchan compared the strategy to one that Revolution Software had used previously to survive. Runaway launched on iOS that June to "mixed or average reviews", according to Metacritic, and HobbyConsolas selected it as one of the "5 Best iOS Games of the Week".

=== Sequels ===

Pendulo Studios followed Runaway with two sequels: Runaway 2: The Dream of the Turtle (2006) and Runaway: A Twist of Fate (2009).

Pendulo Studios began to plan a sequel to Runaway soon after the first game's international launch. Rafael Latiegui later said that the team "wanted to immediately get [into] a video game" after spending a year away, and that a sequel was the "quickest way" because of the groundwork already laid. He noted that Runaway had not been developed with a sequel in mind, but that a large number of unused ideas nevertheless remained after the first game's release. In January 2003, PC Games reported that Runaway 2 was under consideration and had been partly storyboarded but was not yet greenlit. Prior to Runaway's release in France, Latiegui explained that Pendulo was waiting for the rest of the game's global returns before committing to a new title. The first game's commercial performance, combined with the team's desire to explore Runaway further, ultimately became a key inspiration to greenlight a sequel.

Runaway 2 was first announced by DTP Entertainment in August 2003, at the Games Convention in Leipzig. By that time, the game had passed the concepting phase and its plot was finished. Pendulo opted to reuse the same game engine from the first title, with upgrades. The project was initially scheduled for late 2004. Because of Runaway's high profits, Pendulo was able to put its own money into Runaway 2, although most of the game's funding was derived from French investments. Pendulo expanded significantly, and it sought to make the sequel much larger than its predecessor; writer Josué Monchan later said that the team grew overambitious and lost direction. The game underwent numerous delays, initially to mid-2005 and then to late 2005, spring 2006 and September 2006. First released in November 2006 as Runaway 2: The Dream of the Turtle, the game continues the story of Brian Basco and Gina, who fall into trouble because of a plane crash during their vacation to Hawaii. Its international launch came roughly eight months before its release in Spain. The project garnered Pendulo's worst reviews to date, and Monchan later called it "a horrible game". Its poor reception led the team to take feedback into greater consideration for future titles, Monchan said, which influenced the design of the next Runaway entry.

A third Runaway game had been considered during Runaway 2's creation, and Pendulo unofficially confirmed that it was under development in November 2006. It received an official announcement at the Games Convention in August 2007; certain outlets initially reported that Runaway 3 would be set in Japan and would take place immediately after its predecessor. The game was first shown in February 2008 at the Game Developers Conference, where its name was revealed as Runaway: A Twist of Fate. Pendulo and publisher Focus Home Interactive wanted to attract series newcomers with the numberless title, and Jeuxvideo.com reported that the game was "not the direct follow-up" to Runaway 2, but a relatively standalone project. Monchan said that Pendulo "rethought everything" about adventure game development in hopes of avoiding the mistakes of Runaway 2. A new engine was adopted for A Twist of Fate that offered improved graphics, although the game retained a pre-rendered 2D visual style. Unlike the first two Runaway entries, the game features Gina as a playable character alongside Brian. A Twist of Fate was first released internationally in November 2009; its Spanish version, again delayed, launched in early 2010.

The three Runaway games totaled 1.5 million units sold worldwide by 2010. Despite retaining ideas for further sequels, Pendulo opted to temporarily retire the Runaway franchise after A Twist of Fate. Latiegui explained in 2011, "After almost a decade with the saga, we needed a break." The team reported that it was particularly tired of Brian as a character. Nevertheless, Pendulo undertook a Runaway spin-off the following year, under the name Hidden Runaway. Unlike Pendulo's earlier work, Hidden Runaway is a hidden object game aimed at casual players. Released for iOS devices in October 2012, the game was a commercial flop.

== See also ==
- Escape from Monkey Island
- Syberia
- The Black Mirror
- The Westerner
