= After the War (video game) =

1989 video game

After The War
- Spanish ZX Spectrum cover
- Developer: Dinamic Software
- Publisher: Dinamic Software
- Platforms: Amiga, Amstrad CPC, Atari ST, Commodore 64, MS-DOS, MSX, ZX Spectrum, Arcade
- Release: EU: 1989
- Genre: Beat 'em up
- Mode: Single-player

After The War is a side-scrolling beat 'em up video game published in 1989 by Dinamic Software. The player must navigate through a hostile post-apocalyptic city. Although the name of the city is not mentioned in the game itself, both official promotional and unreleased artwork by Luis Royo and Alfonso Azpiri suggest that it is a post-nuclear version of New York City.

== Gameplay ==
The game is structured into two parts. The first part is a side scrolling beat 'em up, and plays in much the same way as other staples of the genre, such as Streets of Rage. This first act takes place in the streets of the city, and consists of a sequence of fights with minor enemies and occasional bosses. The goal is to find the entrance to the city's underground rail transport, that is located on the opposite side of the map.

After completion of the first act, the player is given an opportunity to enter their name on the game's high score board, and is then provided a password which allows them to continue to the second act.

The second part is set in the tunnels and stations of the city's underground rail transport. The gameplay in this section differs from the first, as the player now has the ability to shoot enemies, shifting the genre closer to a shoot 'em up game such as Contra. Many of the enemies in the second act are larger and tougher than in the first, and feature more complex in designs.

== Plot ==
he game takes place in 2019 in Manhattan after a nuclear war. The planet is devastated and in ruins. The player's protagonist is Jonathan Rogers, better known as "Jungle Rogers." His mission is to reach launch platform XV-238, located at the control base of the schizophrenic assassin Professor McJerin, and escape to the outer colonies in space.

== Development ==
=== Versions ===
There are numerous differences between the versions released, depending on which system the version was developed for. For example, some 16-bit versions featured digitized voices while others did not. Some ports featured more complex graphical effects, such as the Amstrad CPC version, which included both mode 0 and mode 1 graphics.

After The War included two of the classic "FX brands" of Dinamic, commercial names that Dinamic used for some features of its games in marketing. These included FX Double Load, consisting of two separate parts to take advantage of computer memory, and FX Giant Sprites, that made use of very large sprites which had the potential to take up ¾ of the total play area height.

The FX Giant Sprites trick was achieved by using sprites that were composed of a set of small parts which allowed for the reuse of said parts in other characters. For example, many enemies share the same trouser and leg animations. In some ports, a problem with the vertical sync of the monitor lets the player easily see this trick as sometimes characters can be rendered and divided into two clearly different slices.

A few computer magazines published notes about a coin-op version of the game that was never released outside Spain, although a coin-op of the game could be played many years before the worldwide home release in the Parque de Atracciones de Madrid, graphically identical to the 16-bit computers counterpart.

=== Cover art ===
Original, unused box art by Alfonso Azpiri

The cover artwork for After the War was created by artist Luis Royo. At the time development began, Spanish comic book author Alfonso Azpiri was a collaborator with Dinamic for the creation of the box art for their games. Azpiri, whose brother Jorge Azpiri contributed some of the graphics for the Amstrad CPC version of After the War, drew an initial version of the intended cover artwork for the game. However, due to its protracted development schedule, by the time the game was completed, Azpiri had ended his collaboration with Dinamic to work at software company Topo Soft. After the War was released with new cover art commissioned to Royo.

== Legacy ==
In 2011, nearly two decades since the dissolution of Dinamic, some of its founding members acquired the rights to distribute the Windows game Collapse in Spain and Italy under their new software company FX Interactive. The game was rebranded as After the War and marketed as belonging to the same fictional universe as the original 1989 game.
