= Capitán Sevilla =

1988 video game

- Developer: Hi-Score
- Publisher: Dinamic Software
- Director: Álvaro Mateos Herrera
- Programmers: Ángel Jiménez; Francisco Gómez; Francisco Rodríguez; Manuel Guillén González; David Brioso Santos
- Artists: Angel Tirado; José Ramón Pérez; Manuel Gasco; Rafael García Fernández
- Composer: David Brioso Santos
- Platforms: Amstrad CPC, MSX, ZX Spectrum
- Release: ESP/EU: 1988
- Genre: Platform
- Mode: Single-player

Capitán Sevilla (Note: English: Captain Sevilla, also known as Capitan Sevilla I and Captain 'S'.) is a 1988 platform video game developed by the Spanish group Hi-Score and published by Dinamic Software for the Amstrad CPC, MSX and ZX Spectrum. In the game, players assume the role of Mariano López, a transporter-turned superhero after eating a radiation-affected blood sausage to fight against the mad scientist Torrebruno and protect Earth.

Capitán Sevilla was conceived during the golden age of Spanish software under the working title Capitán Morcilla (Note: English: Captain Morcilla) by director Álvaro Mateos, who developed titles published by Dinamic Software such as Rocky and West Bank (1985), and formed Hi-Score as a game development group dedicated to microcomputers with royalties obtained from his previous works. The idea originated from a comic strip by artist Angel Tirado during his high school days and the project initially started on the ZX Spectrum but went through a turbulent development cycle before its eventual launch to the market.

Capitán Sevilla proved to be unsuccessful when it was published across Europe but received positive reception from critics across all platforms since its release; praise was given to its originality, audiovisual presentation and addictive gameplay but criticism was geared towards the high difficulty level and ending sequence. In recent years, fans have since experimented with remaking and porting the title to other platforms.

== Gameplay ==
ZX Spectrum screenshot

Capitán Sevilla is a side-scrolling platform game where players assume the role of Mariano López, a transporter-turned superhero after eating a radiation-affected blood sausage to fight against the mad scientist Torrebruno and protect Earth. The game is divided into two phases and players must finish the first phase to obtain a password code and play the second phase via a "Double Load FX" system, as the cassette tape contained one phase on each side.

When López obtains a radioactive blood sausage and eats it, the players become Captain Sevilla and uses his superpowers: Superspush, which moves the enemies in front of Mariano; Supershot, which shoots blood sausages to defeat enemies; Superdefense, which renders Sevilla invulnerable for a brief time period; Superjump, which grants a much more powerful jump; Gliding, which allows López to fly around; and Superstrength, which gives players a blood sausage-shaped energy bar that decreases with enemy contact instead of dying upon first contact as López. Players can come across bonus rounds by exploring each stage, which require certain actions in order to complete them.

Mariano López can move and jump but cannot be controlled after jumping. If López collides with an obstacle during said jump, he continues in the opposite direction. López can also punch to get rid of enemies. There are numerous enemies, each with their own different characteristics as must be avoided, as they kill players at first contact when López is not in his Capitán Sevilla persona. Players are given a total of three lives and once all lives are lost, the game is over.

== Development ==
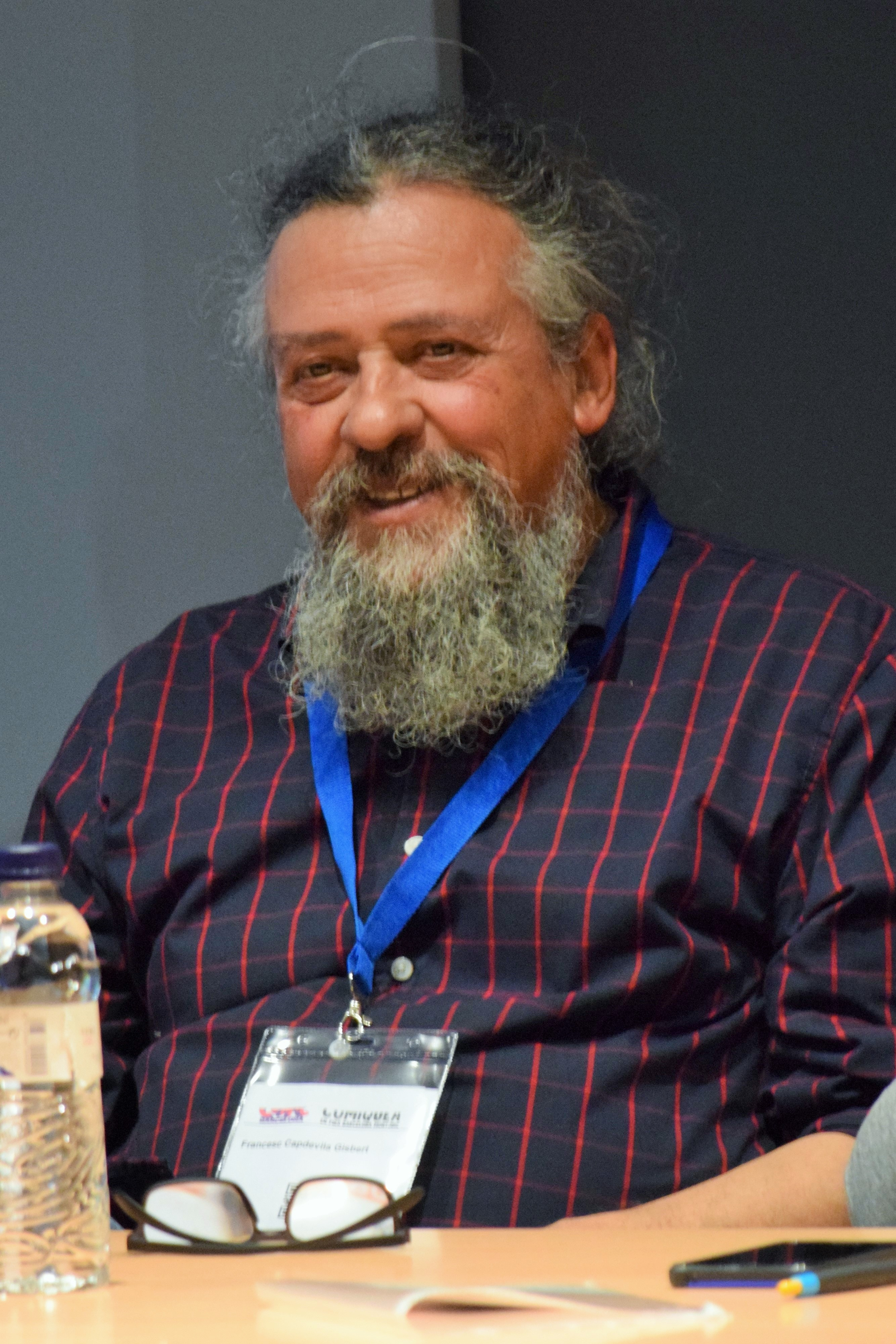
Capitán Sevilla originated from a comic strip created by Hi-Score graphic designer Angel Tirado during his high school days. Dinamic Software brought Spanish cartoonist Max at the request of Tirado for the artwork.

Capitán Sevilla was developed during the golden age of Spanish software under the working title Capitán Morcilla by Hi-Score, a Spanish game development group dedicated to microcomputers formed by director Álvaro Mateos, who previously worked on titles published by Dinamic Software such as Rocky and West Bank (1985). Mateos also acted as programmer alongside Ángel "Macedo" Jiménez, Francisco Gómez, Francisco Rodríguez, Manuel Guillén and David Brioso Santos, who served as music composer as well. Graphists Angel Tirado, José Ramón Pérez, Manuel Gasco and Rafael García Fernández were responsible for the pixel art, while Spanish cartoonist Max was in charge of the artwork. The team recounted the project's development process through interviews and the 2015 documentary ¡No nos gusta Capitán Morcilla!. (Note: English: ¡We don't like Captain Morcilla!)

Mateos decided to form the group using royalties obtained from his previous works and placed advertisements across universities to recruit people with programming and graphic design experience for ZX Spectrum and Amstrad CPC. Mateos and the staff rented an apartment in Triana, Seville to convert the floor into an office, acquired computers and development tools, assigning roles according to the abilities of each member, naming their team as Hi-Score and starting work on Capitán Morcilla. The idea originated from a comic strip of the same name created by lead graphic designer Angel Tirado during his high school period, with its script being used as basis, and Mateos proposed the project to Dinamic. Due to Mateos' contacts, Dinamic would be in charge of publishing the game.

The base version Hi-Score worked with to create Capitán Sevilla was the ZX Spectrum. Due to memory constrains, Tirado stated that tricks were necessary to fit "everything together" and the team decided to make the visuals monochrome except the marker area. Screen scroll was also scrapped in favor of fixed scenes to increase detail for both characters and stage elements. Tirado also implemented a technique based on a comic book guide by José Beá to transpose the hand-drawn artwork from paper into pixel art, in order to process and store graphic information on the computer. Rodríguez stated that the title was "a two-dimensional game with three-dimensional aspects", as there were objects located in a closer plane to achieve a pseudo-3D effect. Rodríguez also stated that the team had to use image masking for objects to make them act "as if it were transparent and the character passed in front of it". "Macedo" Jiménez was in charge of the character animations, focusing on parabolic movements for the flight of the character.

Development lasted more than a year and a half with a personnel between thirteen and fourteen members but proved to be chaotic, as the team missed the scheduled 1987 Christmas release campaign and left their apartment due to Mateos running out of money to pay the rent and pending bills. Both the CPC and MSX versions were created later during development but proved to be complicated and tensions arose. Mateos stated that "everything went to hell" due to his lifestyle compared to people of his young age. Dinamic co-founder Victor Ruiz claimed that his company did not intervene in the game's development aside from the cover art design and its title, which was renamed as Capitán Sevilla due to marketing reasons despite opposition from Hi-Score staff. Following advice from Tirado, Dinamic brought Max to draw the cover art as well as redesign his comic strip and Mariano López. After the title was published, Hi-Score was disbanded and each member went separate ways, either within the video game industry or other sectors.

== Release ==
Capitán Sevilla was published in Spain by Dinamic Software for Amstrad CPC, MSX and ZX Spectrum in the summer of 1988. Both the CPC and Spectrum versions were also published on disk format. The CPC and MSX versions were distributed by DROsoft and Alternative Software's Winner publishing label as well. To promote the game, a prologue comic with artwork by Spanish cartoonist Max was featured in the August 1988 issue of MicroHobby magazine. The title was later included alongside Meganova as part of a 2-in-1 pack compilation for the CPC and ZX Spectrum. In 1989, it was also included as part of the Dinamic 5º Aniversario compilation for all platforms.

== Reception ==
Reception

Review scores
Publication	Score
Micromanía	(MSX/ZXS) 9/10
Amstar	(CPC) 14/20
MicroHobby	(ZXS) 49/60
MSX Club	(MSX) 9/10

Capitán Sevilla was met with positive reception from critics across all platforms since its release but proved to be unsuccessful when it was published across Europe. Spanish magazine MicroHobby reviewed the ZX Spectrum version, praising its originality, sound, good graphics and controls, as well as the addictive gameplay but criticized the high difficulty level. Similarly, Micromanía's José Emilio Barbero reviewed both the MSX and ZX Spectrum versions, commending the addictive gameplay, graphics and originality but criticized its ending sequence.

MSX Club's Willy Miragall reviewed the MSX version, giving positive remarks to the presentation, visuals, controls, sound design, addictive gameplay and difficulty. French magazine Amstar reviewed the Amstrad CPC version, commenting about the action, color palette and sprite animations in a positive light but noted that players "need to be particularly well trained in the handling of the joystick" to successfully progress in Capitán Sevilla.

== Legacy ==
Fans have experimented with remaking and porting Capitán Sevilla to other platforms in recent years. In 2009, a remake was published under a GPL license for Linux, Macintosh and Microsoft Windows, which was developed over the course of three and a half years by members of ComputerEmuZone Games Studio (CEZ GS) Luis Ventura and Daniel Celemín. A demo of an early part of the game was made by Rubén Garcerá Soto for the Virtual Boy in 2010 as part of "Planet Virtual Boy Coding Competition" titled Capitan Sevilla II. Another demo of Capitan Sevilla II was released in 2012 by Garcerá Soto at the hobbyist community Planet Virtual Boy. The Virtual Boy version is being worked on by members of Planet Virtual Boy alongside Soto under the name Capitan Sevilla 3D, complete with stereoscopic 3D effects.
