= 3 Skulls of the Toltecs =

1996 video game

- Developer: Revistronic
- Publisher: Warner Interactive Europe
- Director: Hernán Castillo Brian
- Producers: Rob Smith; Ben Tuszynski
- Designers: Rodrigo Castillo Brian; Hernán Castillo Brian
- Programmer: Hernán Castillo Brian
- Artist: Antonio de Tena
- Writer: Rodrigo Castillo Brian
- Composers: David R. Punshon; Richard Wells
- Platforms: MS-DOS, Windows
- Release: 1996
- Genre: Graphic adventure
- Mode: Single-player

3 Skulls of the Toltecs is a point-and-click graphic adventure game designed by Revistronic for IBM PC compatibles and published by Warner Interactive Europe in 1996. The game uses a 3rd-person perspective, inventory-based puzzle solving, and horizontally scrolling cartoon graphics. 3 Skulls of the Toltecs sold 200,000 copies throughout Europe and 25,000 copies in Spain.

Revistronic followed the game with two sequels: The Westerner (2003) and Fenimore Fillmore's Revenge (2008).

== Plot ==
The game begins in 1866 Arizona when the game's hero, a cowboy named Fenimore Fillmore, tries to rescue an old peddler from a band of attacking rustlers. The dying peddler gives Fenimore a golden skull and tells him the legend of a treasure that can be found by collecting two other golden skulls. To reach his goal, Fenimore Fillmore must battle the evil Friar Anselmo and the perfidious Colonel Leconte (who also seek the treasure), fight fierce Apaches (whose Chief's son's tepee boasts a sheepskin from Harvard), engage Mexican revolutionaries (whose leader is amnesic), outwit witty French soldiers (federated with Emperor Maximilian of México), and suffer the insufferable alcohol-prohibition-ladies league. Solving the puzzles involves fabricating bootleg whiskey, blowing up a bank's safe, escaping from prison, rescuing a pianist from a well, locating and flying a balloon, and turning a devout monk into a gallant rebel general.

== Gameplay ==
The screen is divided into three sections: a central side-scrolling scenery window containing the characters and the items to manipulate or retrieve, a box in the lower left corner containing different verbs (talk, pick up, give, look), and adjacent to this, an inventory box with all the different objects Fenimore possesses. The game is played by using the mouse cursor to select an item or character in the scenery window, an item in the inventory, and a verb. The game requires a player to select (thereby highlighting to facilitate play) one item from each box; for example: clicking on the hat, then on the word "give", will make Fenimore give the hat to the selected character.

== Development ==
3 Skulls of the Toltecs began development at Erbe Software. It was started by brothers Rodrigo and Hernán Castillo, formerly of Dinamic Multimedia. After Erbe dropped 3 Skulls, the pair founded their own company to finish it, under the name Revistronic.

== Reception ==
According to Gerard Masnou of GameLive PC, 3 Skulls of the Toltecs was commercially successful, with sales of 25,000 units in Spain and 200,000 across Europe. Its international success was unique for an adventure game made in Spain. Masnou remarked in late 2002 that, with regard to market penetration beyond its home country, "no Spanish adventure has so far repeated the success" of 3 Skulls. At that time, Pendulo Studios' Spanish game Runaway: A Road Adventure had not been released in many countries.

Masnou called 3 Skulls' critical reception "acceptable", but Revistronic's Hernán Castillo complained that it was underappreciated by Spain's press.

PC Joker gave the game a review score of 72%

PC Player gave the game a review score of 4 out of 5

Geeky Hobbies praised the remaster of the game for its graphics, although did note that the audio was lacking as well as a few glitches.

== Legacy ==
Two sequels were released: The Westerner (2003) and Fenimore Fillmore's Revenge (2008).

3 Skulls of the Toltecs was re-released on GOG.com in June 2019.

== See also ==
- Dráscula: The Vampire Strikes Back
- Hollywood Monsters
