= Camelot Warriors =

1986 video game

- Cover art illustrated by Alfonso Azpiri
- Developers: Dinamic Software, Opera Soft
- Publishers: Ariolasoft, Mastertronic, Dinamic Software
- Platforms: ZX Spectrum, Amstrad CPC, Commodore 64, MSX (Dinamic software only)
- Release: 1986
- Genre: Platformer
- Mode: Single-player

Camelot Warriors is a platform game published in 1986 for the MSX, ZX Spectrum and Amstrad CPC, later ported to the Commodore 64. It was developed in Spain during the so-called Golden Age of Spanish software. The MSX, Spectrum and Amstrad versions were produced by Dinamic Software, while the Commodore 64 port was developed by Opera Soft. The game was originally distributed in the United Kingdom by Ariolasoft and subsequently by Mastertronic.

== Plot ==
"Terrible omens threatened the world after the appearance of strange objects in the land of Camelot: the Voice from Another World, the Mirror of Wisdom, the Elixir of Life and the Fire that does not burn. All of them were elements related to the twentieth century and carried disastrous consequences for a space and time that did not belong to them. The bravest knight of Camelot was entrusted with the mission of finding these objects across the world (the forests, the lake, the caves and the castle) and deliver them to the guardians of each territory, as only they had the power to destroy them."

== Gameplay ==
The player controls a medieval knight armed with sword and armour. The only available actions are attacking with the sword and jumping. Attacks are limited to a certain height and can only be performed while standing, which makes eliminating some enemies difficult.

Jumping is slow and imprecise, and the slightest contact with an enemy is fatal. Despite offering ten lives (five in the Amstrad CPC version), Camelot Warriors is considered a challenging platformer.

To complete the game, the player must collect four key items — the Voice from Another World, the Mirror of Wisdom, the Elixir of Life and the Fire that does not burn. Each must be delivered to a hidden guardian, who then grants a new ability, such as transforming the knight into a frog to cross water (losing the sword attack but gaining a greatly improved jump).

== Development and release ==
The game was designed and programmed by Víctor Ruiz with Florentino Pertejo. It was published by Dinamic Software in Spain in 1986 and ported to various 8-bit systems.

The Commodore 64 version was developed by Opera Soft. In the United Kingdom, Camelot Warriors was released on cassette by Ariolasoft and later, as a budget title, by Mastertronic.

The MSX version was neither localised into English nor published in the UK.

== Reception ==
Contemporary reviews highlighted the colourful and detailed graphics on 8-bit machines, especially the ZX Spectrum and Amstrad CPC versions.

Retrospectively, Camelot Warriors has been recognised as one of Dinamic's most notable early games and a representative example of Spain's 1980s home computer boom.

== See also ==
- Matter of Britain
