= DROsoft =

Spanish video game company

- Company type: Subsidiary
- Industry: Video games
- Founded: 1985; 41 years ago
- Defunct: 1995; 31 years ago
- Headquarters: Madrid, Spain
- Parent: Electronic Arts (1994–1995)

DROsoft was a Spanish computer and video game software distributor headquartered in Madrid. The company was founded in 1985 out of DRO Records, Spain's first independent record label. It is considered to have played a part in the golden age of Spanish software, having been described as one of the "principal distributors" of the age.

They were associated with the publication of a number of ZX Spectrum games, some of which were marketed specifically for their translations to Spanish. The company was further noted for translations of British-made games into Spanish, with the quality of the translations justifying their higher prices as compared to the rest of their software lineup.

DROsoft also published the first graphical adventure game developed in Spain, Igor: Objective Uikokahonia, developed by Pendulo Studios.

In 1988, they entered into an agreement to cooperate with Dinamic Software in distributing games, both in Spain and internationally.

They were acquired by Electronic Arts on 14 November 1994, in order to allow direct distribution of Electronic Arts' software to the Spanish region. One of its founding directors, Miguel Angel Gomez, later became the managing director of EMI Spain; another, Jesús Alonso Gallo, went on to sell another business, Restaurantes.com, to the Michelin Group.

In September 1995 they distributed the first E-books designed for children, as produced by Broderbund. Their last published game was the Spanish version of Discworld in 1995.
