= Game Over II =

1987 video game

- Cover art by Luis Royo
- Developer: Dinamic Software
- Publisher: Dinamic Software
- Designers: Carlos Abril; Javier Cubedo
- Artist: Luis Royo
- Series: Game Over
- Platforms: ZX Spectrum, MSX, IBM PC, Amstrad CPC, Commodore 64, Atari ST
- Release: EU: 1987
- Genres: Scrolling shooter, platform
- Mode: Single-player

Game Over II (known as Phantis in Spain) is a combination scrolling shooter and platform game developed and published by Dinamic Software in 1987 for the ZX Spectrum, MSX, MS-DOS, Amstrad CPC, Commodore 64, and Atari ST.

== Gameplay ==
Game Over II is a mix between a scrolling shooter (similar to R-Type) and a platform game (similar to Turrican). There are four "phases" with six levels each. Some versions of the game were split into two parts due to size restrictions.

== Plot ==
In the original Spanish version (Phantis), the player controls Commander Serena on a mission to rescue her expedition partner captured on Moon 4 of the SOTPOK System, better known as the world of Phantis. The English-language version (Game Over II) takes place immediately after the events of Game Over, where Arkos, the hero of the rebellion, is nowhere to be found. After it has been discovered that he has been imprisoned on the jail planet Phantis by the heirs of the empress Gremla, Major Locke is chosen for the rescue mission. Other than the graphical change of a female player character to a male player character, the game itself is largely identical in both versions.

== Release ==
Although originally released as an independent game under the title Phantis, it was retitled as a sequel to Game Over. The Atari ST version was never published in Spain and only exists with the Game Over II title. The game's promotion included an appearance of a model dressed up as Queen Gremla at the trade convention PC Show '88.

== Reception ==
The game was given generally mediocre reviews. It received the scores of 69% from Amstrad Action, 55% from Commodore User, 60-63% from The Games Machine, and 62% from Sinclair User. Amstrad Computer User gave it a 17/20.

== Legacy ==
A spiritual successor to Phantis featuring a modern take of the characters and setting, titled Ultionus: A Tale of Petty Revenge, was released in 2014.
