= The Westerner (video game) =

2003 video game

- Developer: Revistronic
- Publisher: Planeta DeAgostini
- Designer: Hernan Castillo
- Writer: Rodrigo Castillo
- Engine: PICTuRE
- Platforms: Microsoft Windows, Wii, iOS, Android (operating system)
- Release: December 21, 2003
- Genre: Graphic adventure
- Mode: Single-player

The Westerner (also known as Wanted: A Wild Western Adventure and Fenimore Fillmore: The Westerner) is a graphic adventure game developed by Revistronic. It was published in late 2003 in Spain by Planeta DeAgostini. In 2004, it was published worldwide, including in the US, where it was renamed Wanted: A Wild Western Adventure. Set in the Wild West, it is the sequel to 3 Skulls of the Toltecs. The game is in 3D, although it preserves the traditional point and click gameplay and comic style of LucasArts productions. In May 2016, Casual Brothers reintroduced the game on both iOS and Android. By March 2005, The Westerner had sold more than 200,000 units worldwide.

In 2008, The Westerner was followed by a sequel, under the title Fenimore Fillmore's Revenge.

== Gameplay ==
Fillmore travels through different locations, riding his horse that needs to be fed carrots from the farms of in-game friends or bought by the player at the village store.

Action sequences require Fillmore to use his gun. The gun is fired by a left-click of the mouse (if the players cannot move) or a right-click of the mouse (if the players can get around using a left-click of the mouse).

- Fenimore Fillmore cannot die.
- The game contains puzzles that require skill, accuracy and speed.
- Fenimore must participate in a contest of insults.
- Throughout the game the user collects money, which can be found in drawers and multiple locations, and in multiple scenarios. The player can obtain money by borrowing from the bank or sending telegrams from the train station.
- In the shop the user can purchase newspapers. These artifacts can be useful because they provide clues to progress in the game.
- The iOS/Android version includes a help pack that, besides supplying 50 dollars per game, lets the user use the horse after giving them only one carrot, so the user can avoid having to feed their mount before each journey.

The screen is divided into three sections: the main section, the top bar and the bottom bar. The main section shows the scenario that appears in widescreen. The top bar reveals the player's inventory from which various objects can be selected. The bottom bar is black and shows the running actions and dialogue subtitles.

The icon in the upper left corner is the main menu tab, which is represented by a sheriff's star.

The cursor normally appears as a gun. It becomes a magnifying glass that can be used to inspect an object when hovering over it. Right-clicking the mouse while it is a magnifying glass transforms it into a sandwich when clicking on a character to talk to them. The mouse turns into a hand when clicking on objects to pick them up or use them. Inventory items can be used by dragging them.

== Plot ==
One night, while riding alone through the meadows, Fenimore Fillmore arrives at a farm that is under attack by gunmen and becomes a hero for helping the farmer, a man named Bannister, fend them off. As a token of his appreciation, Bannister then invites Fenimore for dinner and to spend the night. Early the next morning, Fenimore awakens to discover that his gun is missing; he assumes that Bannister's son Billy has borrowed it to take it to school. In his quest to retrieve his weapon, Fenimore becomes involved in helping Bannister and the other farmers in their ongoing fight against Starek, a powerful rancher whose niece, Rhiannon, becomes the love of his life.

== Development ==
In France, the game was localized by Focus Home Interactive in an effort to capitalize on its success with Runaway: A Road Adventure.

=== Developers ===
- Design and development: Hernán Castillo Brian
- Programming: Alex Camaño Alonso
- Animation: Ignacio Sastri "Ñaku", Javier Rollón Móran, David Nativoli Diez, and Juan Diego Zapata
- Music: Emilio de Paz
- Story: Rodrigo Castillo Brian
- Storyboards: Gonzalo Hernánz Gómez
- Script: Alex Camano Alonso, Ignacio Sánchez Ruiz, and Belén Jiménez Delgado
- Production: Juan Ramón Martin and Hernán Castillo Brian
- Sound engineer: Agustín Muñoz Sánchez-Villacañas

== Release and sales ==
Before The Westerner's release, German publisher Crimson Cow told MCV in January 2004 that pre-orders for the game were "already outperforming those of Runaway", a major hit the company had published in the region. That February, developer Revistronic reported that it was selling at a good pace, and that a sequel was in the first stages of development. Sales in Europe surpassed 100,000 units by June 2004, and worldwide sales had risen above 200,000 units by March 2005. However, according to Christopher Kellner of German publisher DTP Entertainment, the game's sales had fallen "a bit short of our expectations" in Germany by January 2005. He considered it a commercial disappointment for the company, something he attributed in part to its visual style, which he believed was unpopular in Germany.

== Reception ==
=== Domestic ===
Reception

Review scores
Publication	Score
GameLive PC	9/10
Micromanía	92/100

=== International ===
Reception

Review score
Publication	Score
Computer Gaming World	4/5

The editors of Computer Gaming World nominated The Westerner as their 2004 "Adventure Game of the Year", although it lost to In Memoriam.

== Sequel ==
Revistronic released a sequel to The Westerner, entitled Fenimore Fillmore's Revenge, in 2008.

== See also ==
- Runaway: A Road Adventure
- Runaway 2: The Dream of the Turtle
