= Game Over (video game) =

1987 video game

- Cover art by Luis Royo
- Developer: Dinamic Software
- Publisher: Imagine Software
- Designers: Ignacio Ruiz Tejedor; Pedro Sudón Aguilar
- Artist: Ignacio Ruiz Tejedor
- Platforms: Amstrad CPC, Commodore 64, MSX, Thomson TO7, ZX Spectrum
- Release: July 1987
- Genre: Action
- Mode: Single-player

Game Over is an action video game developed by Dinamic Software and published by Imagine Software in 1987. It was released for the Amstrad CPC, Commodore 64, MSX, Thomson TO7, and ZX Spectrum. The game includes some adventure game elements. A prompted unrated sequel, Game Over II, was released in 1987.

== Plot ==
Gameplay screenshot

Arkos, a former loyal lieutenant of the beautiful but evil galactic empress Queen Gremla, became a rebel dedicated to end her cruel tyranny. The first part of the game takes place on the prison planet Hypsis, from which Arkos must try to escape. In the second part, Arkos arrives in the jungle swamp planet Sckunn to infiltrate the queen's palace, defeat her Giant Guardian robot, and assassinate her.

== Reception ==
Reception

Award
Publication	Award
Your Sinclair	YS Megagame

Controversy arose around the presence of a visible nipple on the advertising and inlay artwork, which had originally appeared on the cover of Heavy Metal (May 1984 - Vol. 8, No. 2) called Cover Ere Comprimee and is attributed to Luis Royo. Oliver Frey, the art editor for Crash magazine, added a metal corset covering the exposed area so that it could be printed in their magazine. In the end retailers demanded that a logo be placed over the original artwork's nipple. Game Over won the awards for best advert and best inlay of the year, according to the readers of Crash.

The game itself was mostly well received. Computer & Video Games awarded it 8/10 for the ZX Spectrum and 7/10 for the Amstrad CPC versions. The MSX version was rated an overall 8/10 by MSX Extra, and the Commodore 64 version was given a score of 68% by Zzap!64. Your Sinclair rated the ZX Spectrum version 9/10, but the 1990 re-release edition from Alternative Software, which featured a sanitised version of the original cover described as "tragically modified", was given only 52% for its high difficulty level.

== Legacy ==
Game Over was followed by Game Over II (also known as Phantis in its native Spain), which was developed and published by Dinamic Software in 1987.
