= Golden age of Spanish software =

The golden age of Spanish software (Spanish: edad de oro del software español) was a time between 1983 and 1992, when Spain became the second largest 8-bit computer entertainment software producer in Europe, only behind the United Kingdom. Many software companies based in Spain launched their career in this period, including Dinamic Software, Topo Soft, Opera Soft, Made in Spain and Zigurat. The widespread adoption of 16-bit technology and rampant software piracy led to it abruptly stopping around 1992. The name Edad de oro del soft español was coined by specialized magazines of the time and has been used to refer to these years until nowadays.

== History ==
=== Rise (1983–1985) ===
In the year 1983, the first home personal computers started arriving in Spain, all of them 8 bit machines. ZX Spectrum and Amstrad CPC were the most sold in the country, followed by MSX and Commodore 64 among others. These were simple machines, with lesser resources, therefore easy to manipulate, so many young programmers all over the country started experimenting with them.

The Golden Era of Spanish Software officially starts with the launch of Bugaboo, by PACO & PACO, the first Spanish video game to get a massive international distribution. Shortly, Fred (Roland on the ropes for Amstrad), by others authors, this time under the company Made in Spain, was another success, and the owners of Made in Spain decided to create Zigurat, a mother company that would at first be dedicated to distribution, turning Made in Spain into a producing company for Zigurat, which also would at first distribute titles from independent companies. Years later, Made in Spain and Zigurat would completely merge into a single producer and distributor company.

Meanwhile, Dinamic Software made their first steps when they launched Yenght for ZX Spectrum, which was a text adventure. And in the field of distribution, Erbe Software, the main Spanish software distributor for more than a decade, started their activity. In their first years, Erbe tried also to produce their own titles, but in this activity they did not last for long.

=== Peak (1985–1989) ===
In 1985, with the birth of magazines Micromanía and Microhobby, videogames gained massive popularity, and the rest of the top companies of the Era, Opera Soft in 1986 and Topo Soft in 1987 started their activity, the first one with Livingstone, I presume, and the second one with Spirits, after their authors programmed for Erbe Software Las tres luces de Glaurung (Conquestador).

The just born Zigurat had their biggest success as Sir Fred and El misterio del Nilo, an unofficial version of the movie The Jewel of the Nile, which caused problems internationally because one of the characters of the game was too similar to Michael Douglas, and the authors were forced to change the graphic design of this character in the international versions.

Dinamic had their first huge successes in the Johny Jones trilogy, comprising Saimazoom, Babaliba, and mainly Abu Simbel Profanation. After this, they would start another trilogy, the Moves trilogy, comprising Army Moves, Navy Moves, and much later Arctic Moves. And little by little, publishing titles starring famous sportsmen became popular. Dinamic were the first, with Basket Master starring Fernando Martín, and they were followed by other companies, with titles starring Ángel Nieto, Carlos Sainz, Poli Díaz, Emilio Butragueño and others.

Meanwhile, Opera Soft published Goody, Sol Negro, Cosa Nostra, and above all, La Abadía del Crimen, based on Umberto Eco's The Name of the Rose. On the other hand, Topo Soft, the last of the big ones, quickly arrived on top with titles like Mad Mix Game and its continuation, and Survivor among others.

Meanwhile, Dinamic published a text adventure version of Don Quijote, and after that, a section of Dinamic dedicated only to text adventures became independent, and they named themselves Aventuras AD, publishing titles like El Jabato among others.

=== Decline (1989–1992) ===
In 1985 the 16/32-bit Amiga and Atari ST arrived, and little by little, IBM PC compatibles, followed by consoles like SNES and Mega Drive. Although the Spanish companies did some tiny efforts to evolve, they never really switched to 16-bits and concentrated on the declining 8-bit market which, almost extinct in Europe, still had strength in Spain, mainly thanks to the rule Erbe Software, main distributor in the country, imposing a sales price of 875 pesetas (5,26 euros) for all their titles, trying to put an end to piracy.

But at this moment, Spanish companies started having serious financial problems, and one by one they launched their last titles. Topo Soft funders left the company in 1989 to establish Animagic, whose main title was Mortadelo y Filemon II (Clever and Smart II). Born in bad times, they did not last for long. On the other hand, Topo Soft launched Lorna, Journey to the Center of the Earth, and above all, Gremlins 2, is the first time a Spanish video game company managed to get an exclusive license for all Europe from a Hollywood movie. In 1991, aware of the importance of 16 bit, they tried to switch, with the project of creating a desktop environment for MS-DOS, but the project did not succeed, and Topo closed on bankruptcy in 1992.

Meanwhile, Opera Soft, after publishing Gonzalezzz, Mot and Angel Nieto Pole 500, starts decaying like the rest of the companies. In their last months, they launched titles like La Colmena and one dedicated to Barcelona 92, to disappear shortly after. Some of their components, like Gonzalo Suárez Girard (Gonzo Suárez), would later move to Pyro Studios launching titles like Commandos: Behind Enemy Lines among others.

Aventuras AD, paradoxically, had their most successful period during this time of decline, launching the most of their titles during this time, mainly the Ci-U-Than Legends trilogy, composed of La Diosa de Cozumel, Los Templos Sagrados and Chichén Itzá, being pioneers in Spain creating a predecessor of graphic adventures with La Aventura Espacial, a text adventure controlled by menus. Nevertheless, the sales did not last for long, and Aventuras AD disappeared in 1992.

Zigurat and Dinamic were the only companies which survived from the Golden Era of Spanish Software, although they had to transform and abandon their previous activity. Zigurat, after an 8-bit market collapsed, started developing coin up arcade games, lasting for many years. Dinamic Software, on the other hand, after publishing After the War, Narco Police and Risky Woods, closed on bankruptcy and was refounded as Dinamic Multimedia in 1993, having in PC Fútbol as their biggest success during the 1990s. However, the dot-com bubble finished Dinamic Multimedia in 2001, but before this, the original founders of the company, who had left it in 1999, had already founded FX Interactive, which is still known nowadays.

== 2010s resurgence ==
The 1990s and 2000s have been described as "lost decades" for the Spanish video game industry. However, Alberto Flores de Rio wrote in the Encyclopedia of Video Games that the 2010s may be a resurgence for Spanish-based game development. Akaoni Studio and MercurySteam started off the decade with financially successful games. Alejando Alcolea of Hobby Consolas called 2015 the possible start for a "second golden age of Spanish software".
