= Yenght =

1984 video game

- Developer: Dinamic Software
- Publisher: Dinamic Software
- Platform: ZX Spectrum
- Release: 1984
- Genre: Interactive fiction
- Mode: Single-player

Yenght: La Fuente de la Juventud is a Spanish interactive fiction game published in 1984 by Dinamic Software for the ZX Spectrum. It is written in BASIC. Yenght is the first game from Dinamic Software and the first graphic adventure game published in the Spanish market.

== Gameplay ==
The game begins inside a maze where the player must first find a key and escape through the exit. Once outside, the player begins searching, but must be careful because outside there are several locations that connect with the labyrinth. The game also has rudimentary secondary characters, although perhaps due to programming error, it is possible to talk to them even after death.

== Plot ==
The player's mission is to find the fountain of youth.

== Development ==
The development process was both handmade and homemade - tapes were not manufactured until they had received enough orders to justify them ordering copies of the print covers and making duplicates of the cassette tapes. Originally they received a few tens of mail orders, but this later ballooned into several hundreds.

== Reception ==
El Mundo Del Spectrum wrote that despite its simplicity, the game "overflowed with magic and charm". IGN recommended that players take out a paper and pencil to draw a map and avoid getting lost in the game's world.

=== Legacy ===
The game was featured as part of FX Museum's official launch celebrating 30 years of their company's video games - by this point, Dinamic Software had evolved into FX Interactive.
