= Army Moves =

1986 video game

- ZX Spectrum cover art
- Developer: Dinamic Software
- Publisher: Imagine Software
- Programmer: Marc Wilding
- Artist: Simon Butler
- Composers: Fred Gray (C64); David Whittaker (ST, Amiga)
- Platforms: Amiga, Amstrad CPC, Atari ST, Commodore 64, MS-DOS, MSX, ZX Spectrum
- Release: 1986 (CPC, ZX); 1987 (MSX); April 1987 (Amiga, C64); 1988 (ST); 1989 (DOS)
- Genre: Scrolling shooter
- Mode: Single-player

Army Moves is a scrolling shooter game developed by Dinamic Software and released for the Amiga, Amstrad CPC, Atari ST, Commodore 64, MSX and ZX Spectrum. It is the first installment in the Moves Trilogy and was followed by Navy Moves in 1987 and Arctic Moves in 1995. It was first released in 1986 and published by Dinamic in Spain and by Imagine Software. Dinamic Software also developed an MS-DOS version of the game, published in 1989 in Spain.

== Gameplay ==
The game contains seven levels, which are divided into two main sections. The first four levels make up the first section, in which the player drives an army unit (jeep or helicopter) through a terrain, steering clear of hostile vehicles.

In the last three levels that comprise the second main section, one plays as a soldier who shoots enemies along his way. In the fifth level, the soldier must jump from rock to rock in a river, shooting hostile birds. Thereafter, the soldier makes his way into the enemy headquarters with the goal of retrieving secret documents.

== Reception ==
Reception

Awards
Publication	Award
Computer and Video Games	C+VG Hit
Sinclair User	SU Classic

Army Moves was regarded as a rather bad game on the Amiga – "almost non-existent gameplay makes this very poor value for money", according to a review in Zzap!. It received mixed reviews from ZX Spectrum magazines and was successful enough in Spain to spawn two follow-ups, Navy Moves in 1988 and Arctic Moves in 1995. The latter appeared only on the PC platform, and it included the first two games in the series, playable through a ZX Spectrum emulator, as an extra. A fourth entry in the series, Desert Moves was announced at the end of the game Arctic Moves, but never appeared.

The game music in non-Spanish versions is based on the Colonel Bogey March.
