= Saimazoom =

1984 video game

- Developers: Dinamic Software; Karoshi (MSX conversion)
- Publishers: Dinamic Software; Silversoft (United Kingdom); Karoshi (MSX conversion)
- Programmer: Víctor Ruiz
- Artist: Luis Rodríguez Soler
- Series: Johnny Jones
- Platforms: ZX Spectrum; MSX
- Release: ZX Spectrum: 1984; MSX: 6 December 2005
- Genres: Action-adventure; Maze
- Mode: Single-player

Saimazoom is a 1984 action video game-adventure video game developed by Dinamic Software in Spain for the ZX Spectrum. It was distributed in the United Kingdom by Silversoft. A 2005 conversion for the MSX was developed by Karoshi. It was the first of three in a trilogy of titles by the developer including Babaliba and Abu Simbel Profanation. The game was a commercial success.

== Gameplay ==
Playing as Johny Jones, an explorer, players must search for sacks of coffee hidden in the jungle, whilst avoiding obstacles such as snakes, by using items such as boats or knives for cutting through the vegetation of the jungle.

== Development ==
Development was led by programmer Victor Ruiz. Ruiz. Ruiz stated the concept was influenced by viewing Spanish television advertisements for Saimaza Coffee. Luis Rodríguez Soler designed the cover art. The first version of the game was released on cassette for the ZX Spectrum in 1984.
