= Hundra (video game) =

1988 action video game

- Developer: Zeus Software
- Publishers: Dinamic Software; Mastertronic
- Programmer: Ricardo Puerto
- Artist: Raúl López
- Composer: Roman Hergueta
- Platforms: Amstrad CPC, MSX, ZX Spectrum
- Release: 1988
- Genre: Action
- Mode: Single-player

Hundra is an action game developed by Spanish studio Zeus Software and published by Dinamic Software for the Amstrad CPC, MSX and ZX Spectrum in 1988. It was loosely inspired by the 1983 film Hundra but is not based on it. Hundra was well received by Spanish press, including review scores of 44/50 from Amstrad Accion and 9/10 from Micromania. The game was famous for its erotic cover art, which won the best title art of 1988 award from MicroHobby.
