= Risky Woods =

1992 video game

- Developers: Dinamic Software; Zeus Software; Electronic Arts (Genesis)
- Publisher: Electronic Arts
- Composer: José Antonio Martin Tello
- Platforms: Amiga, Atari ST, MS-DOS, Genesis
- Release: 1992
- Genre: Platform
- Mode: Single-player

Risky Woods is a fantasy-themed, side-scrolling platform game developed by Dinamic Software and Zeus Software and published by Electronic Arts in 1992. It was released as Jashin Draxos (邪神ドラクソス, Evil God Draxos) in Japan.

== Plot ==
The ancient monks who preserve the wisdom of the Lost Lands have been frozen in stone by antagonist Draxos and his minions. Young protagonist Rohan must plunge into the Risky Woods to release them.

== Gameplay ==
Most of Risky Woods involves Rohan running and jumping between ledges, and fighting monsters while freeing the monks from stone. There are four worlds, each with two levels. At the end of each world, the player faces a guardian/boss. The different worlds include the Mountain Pass, Hanging Gardens, Catacombs, and the Hidden World. Rohan is initially armed with an infinite amount of throwing knives. Both the standard monsters such as skeletons and flying demons drop coins once defeated.

At the end of each level, coins can be spent at "Ye Olde Shoppe". Rohan can trade in his knives for items such as fire, an axe, a chain, or a boomerang. The same weapon can be bought up to three times, increasing its power with each purchase. The player can also pay to fill their energy.

In order to complete a level, all good monks must be freed from stone. Bad monks are also trapped in stone and are indistinguishable from the good ones. Once freed, the bad monks will attack Rohan. The only way to avoid the bad monks is to remember their locations on subsequent playthroughs.

The secondary objective of each level is to pass through "Eye toll gates". The player must find two halves of an Eye-Key and then use the completed Eye-Key to pass through the door.

Chests drop from the sky randomly during gameplay and contain items that can either have negative effects, such as transporting the player to a previous part of the level, or have positive effects, such as granting more health and time or rarely an extra life.

Continues may be found, but only two are given in the entirety of the game. Once those continues are used up, the game ends and the player has to start over from the beginning. The final level leads to a castle where Draxos must be defeated. After Rohan defeats Draxos, a short animation plays followed by the game over sequence.

== Development and release ==
Spanish magazine Hobby Consolas reported in February 1993 that Risky Woods had been released in Europe the previous December, marking Dinamic Software's expansion into the 16-bit console market. The magazine also covered promotional activities surrounding the game's launch.

== Ports ==
The Genesis/Mega Drive version has some differences from the other versions. The player is able to collect links which can be used to improve armor. The "Eye toll gates" require the player to repeat the melodies that the gatekeepers play using the controller. Rohan holds a staff and wears a tunic or toga rather than the tank top and pants that he wears in other versions. The "Eye-Key" and coins are visually different.

== Reception ==
In 2017, HobbyConsolas named Risky Woods one of the greatest Spanish games ever released.
