= A.M.C.: Astro Marine Corps =

1989 video game

- MSX cover art
- Developer: Creepsoft
- Publisher: Dinamic Software
- Programmer: Pablo Ariza
- Composer: José A. Martín
- Platforms: Amiga, Atari ST, Commodore 64, ZX Spectrum, Amstrad CPC, MSX
- Release: 1989
- Genres: Platform, shooter
- Mode: Single-player

A.M.C.: Astro Marine Corps is a 1989 platform shooter video game developed by Creepsoft and published by Dinamic Software. It was released for the Amiga, Atari ST, Commodore 64, ZX Spectrum, Amstrad CPC, and MSX. The program as written by Pablo Ariza with music by José A. Martín.

== Gameplay ==
The player controls a member of the eponymous Astro Marine Corps, on a mission to stop the Deathbringers, a conglomerate of multiple alien criminals, from launching a campaign to conquer the galaxy. To fulfill this mission, the marine must run from left to right, jumping over obstacles and shooting aliens that try to kill him. Colliding with the aliens or their shots will lower the marine's health bar, or in the case of some enemies, kill him outright, making him lose one of his four lives. From time to time, boxes containing power-ups or booby traps drop from the sky, and the marine must shoot them to reveal their contents. Power-ups include health refills, grenades and various alternate shot types such as a flame thrower or a spread shot. The marine can also obtain temporary invulnerability, although it does not work with enemies that can kill him instantly.

The game is divided into two phases. Each phase must be completed in a limited amount of time, which is extended when a checkpoint is reached. In the first phase, the marine must reach the Deathbringers' ship which is on planet Dendar and hijack it. At the end of the phase, a boss alien, the Krauer, must be defeated. In the second phase, the marine must fight through the Deathbringers' home planet and destroy their leader, the Great Alien King, to end the invasion.

== Reception ==
Retro Games Review felt the title was worth repeated play-throughs. ACE: Advanced Computer Entertainment felt the title was slick but straightforward. The One felt the game offered the "monster mashing" genre a "bit of class". ST Format thought it was no more than a competent shooter. Amiga Reviews felt the graphics were the best part. The Games Machine called the game as repetitive, clichéd, and unnecessarily hard. ZZap!64 felt it could pass as an accurate military sim.
