= Arctic Moves =

1995 video game

- MS-DOS title screen
- Developer: Dinamic Software
- Publisher: Imagine Software
- Platforms: MS-DOS, Atari ST, Amiga
- Release: MS-DOS: EU: 1995; Atari ST: EU: 2001; Amiga: EU: 2017
- Genre: Run and gun
- Mode: Single-player

Arctic Moves is a run and gun video game developed by Dinamic Software for the Atari ST, but this version was not released due to Dinamic's Software bankruptcy (1992). The game was ported to MS-DOS compatible operating systems and published in 1995 by Dinamic Multimedia. The Atari ST version was finally developed by Luis Mariano Garcia (an ex member of Dinamic Software and later, Dinamic Multimedia). An Amiga conversion of the Atari ST version was released in February 2017 by Meynaf. It is the third installment in the Moves Trilogy and preceded by Army Moves in 1986 as well as Navy Moves in 1987.

== Plot ==
After being successful on his previous missions in Army Moves and Navy Moves, Derdhal must now travel to the Arctic and infiltrate a base held by aliens who want to use future human technology for their causes. A U-92 submarine takes Derdhal outside the arctic base and he must use his weapons and skills to finally find out what is going on. The game follows the issues of the previous ones, especially in difficulty levels.

== Gameplay ==
The game is split into two parts. In the first part (Mission 1), the player starts on the frozen surface of the Arctic. There they infiltrate the enemy base to destroy the communications system and destroy all their vehicles, get the job done, and obtain the code for the second part (Mission 2). The code is useful to unlock the second mission (a typical scenario for Dinamic Software games). In the first part, the player fights with hordes of various enemies varying from arctic commandos to air troops, who will shoot or throw grenades instantly. There are several mounted machine guns scattered around the areas. Apart from shooting, the game offers a lot of platform game style action, in which the player must jump to higher grounds in order to reach certain spots and objects. Not only must the player defend the energy bar, but they must also watch the limited time offered before ending the mission. There are scattered energy bonuses (depicted as hearts) and extra time bonuses (depicted as clocks) to collect. The second part is still an action-adventure game, but now inside the alien spaceship. The player's mission is to connect the seven main systems of the spaceship. The dark corridors feature robots and deadly alien species. There are a few huge beasts called CAPITOSAURUS, some of them throwing acid balls, which can only be killed by grenades.
