= Malefic Time =

Graphic novel by Luis Royo and Romulo Royo

- Created by: Luis Royo and Romulo Royo

Print publications
- Novel(s): Malefic Time Codex: Apocalypse
- Comics: Malefic Time: SOUM
- Graphic novel(s): Malefic Time: Apocalypse; Malefic Time: 110 Katanas; Malefic Time: Aquelarre

Films and television
- Short film(s): SOUM; Project Presentation

Games
- Role-playing: Malefic Time: Plenilunio

Audio
- Original music: Avalanch: Apocalypse

Miscellaneous
- Toy(s): Nocturna Models; Yamato USA

Malefic Time is a visual project created by Spanish artists Luis Royo and Romulo Royo. It is set in a post apocalyptic world that mixes reality, leading to the decay of the society, with real manifestations of mythological beliefs and superstitions of different cultures.

The main plot is presented in a trilogy of graphic novels with illustration made by both artists. The protagonist Luz travels through the universe of Malefic Time and meets different people, allies, enemies and their way of surviving in this broken world.

The project has been carried to other media (comics, novels, RPG, music, shorts), developing different aspects of the universe, expanding and making it deeper.

== Fictional setting ==
Malefic Time is a fantasy universe where humanity is not alone in creation: there are other creatures, called in many ways over the years, now known as Celestials and Fallen.

These creatures of immense power have been influencing, manipulating us and waging a war in which each side tries to crush the other. In 2019 the world began to sink: social structures crumbled, the world economy disappeared and riots began due to a disease that began to spread worldwide. It was then in 2020 when Celestials and The Fallen showed themselves openly to the world.

This is 2033, and everyone has in mind that it is the end of an era. According to astrology the Age of Aquarius is coming, a shift to inward development of individuals and the rejection of imposed laws, that will strongly influence human behavior.

== Plot summary ==
=== Luz – Malefic ===
She was presented for the first time on the cover of the illustrated book with the same title more than 20 years ago. But it is not until in 2010 when Luis Royo and Romulo Royo retake the character, when her story is told and the “Malefic Time” project is founded. Malefic is the protagonist, all the plot revolves around her development and in her search for identity.

Her real name is Luz. She moves through New York City looking for libraries and museums, she knows that there, in the old books and ancient paintings are all the keys to understand this new world and to find out who she is.

In the dilapidated warehouse where she lives there are hundreds of books and papers that she brings from her walks through the city libraries, all of them with apocalyptic themes, Romanesque paintings books, books of Masons, witchcraft, alchemy, notes of prophets and seers, oriental writings, Aztec and African arts, reproductions of paintings from ancient times, Greek mythology or Egyptian hieroglyphics studies. All part of a puzzle about the final judgment.

Her search for identity answer her questions, the cracks and falls are what determine her. She is a broken character built on bipolarity between her power, determination, great resolute and combat skills, and her apparent role in the future against the huge fragility supposed by doubts, questions, and frequent states of obsession, disease, collapse and trance. She is a charismatic character with multiple layers that make her an atypical heroine/anti-heroine through which the deep folds and nuances of the story are known.

The course of her journey is from New York City to Tokyo and Paris. On a trip of spiritual quest. A road full of mysticism and forbidden topics by the current culture. A symbol of change for men. An uprising against the oppression of the laws and regulations that govern the world.

=== Celestials and The Fallen ===
These beings can be associated with Angels and Demons in the Judeo-Christian biblical tradition in appearance but they are much more. They have been the origin of all gods for all cultures, they changed names throughout history, but their conflict and their intervention goes back to the earliest days of humankind. The first indications of their existence are dated back to Sumerian religion (the cradle of human civilization) and are extended, altered, contaminated, adapted to all forms of religion in the ancient Mediterranean and soon after to other societies of the world.

The initial conflict, represented biblically with angel Lucifer's rebellion against God establishes an unbridgeable rift between these two positions that have continued settling their disputes over human existence. Both positions represent two diametrical ways of understanding existence with the following associations, among others, these inherent values:

- Celestials: The Sun, the masculine, the Authority, order, the standard, foreign, Age of Pisces.
- The Fallen: The Moon, the Feminine, Nature, Spirituality, instinct, the inside, Age of Aquarius.

== Adaptations ==
- Plenilunio is a role playing game set in the Malefic Time universe
- Codex: Apocalypse is a novel adaptation based on Malefic Time: Apocalypse written by Jesús Vilches. It tells in detail the plot developed in New York City.
- Malefic Time: Soum by Kenny Ruiz concerns the past life of Soum is narrated before her encounter with Luz
- Avalanch: Apocalypse is a concept album recounting of Malefic Time: Apocalypse by the band Avalanch.
