= Fenimore Fillmore's Revenge =

2008 video game

- Developer: Revistronic
- Publisher: Nobilis
- Designer: Hernán Castillo
- Release: 2008
- Genre: Graphic adventure
- Mode: Single-player

Fenimore Fillmore's Revenge is a 2008 graphic adventure game developed by the Spanish company Revistronic. It is the third game in the Fenimore Fillmore series, following 3 Skulls of the Toltecs (1996) and The Westerner (2003). While its predecessors are cartoonish comedies, Fenimore Fillmore's Revenge features a darker tone and visual look. The game began development around May 2004. Following unofficial reports, the game was revealed in May 2005.

Fenimore Fillmore's Revenge received a score of 7 out of 10 from MeriStation and a 1.5 out of 5 from Adventure Gamers.
