= Mot (TV series) =

French animated children's television series

Mot is a French children's animated television series about a purple monster. Based on the children's comics by Alfonso Azpiri, Mot is from the Monstrous Organicus Telluricus family. The series follows Mot's adventures with his human friend Leo.

Mot has the ability to teleport himself through time with ease, but not always with great accuracy. In order to voyage through time and space, Mot simply has to find a door opening onto a tiny space equipped with a movable panel, and he arrives unexpectedly in his friend Leo's room via the wardrobe door.

Mot ran from 1996 to 1997. It was rebroadcast in the US, France, Spain, Australia (ABC), Singapore, the U.A.E., New Zealand, Poland and Hungary throughout the 1990s.

== Characters ==
Mot (Gérard Rinaldi): The principal character of the series and a member of the Monstrous Organicus Telluricus race. He is a teleporting purple monster who generally started episodes by transporting himself into Leo's wardrobe.

Leo (Christophe Lemoine, and later Mathias Kozlowski): As the main human character, Leo partook in all of Mot's adventures. He is Mot's best friend even though he often gets into trouble because of their relationship. It is revealed in the final episode, when Mot travels forward in time, that Leo will become a successful businessman, but is still excited to see his old friend after many years.

Diane (Dominique Vallée and Barbara Tissier): Leo's girlfriend, she is ignorant of Mot's existence but often suspects Leo is hiding something from her. She comes close to discovering Mot on numerous occasions.

Leo's Parents (Mother: Sophie Deschaumes and Father: Cyrille Artaux): Leo's parents are typically clueless to the existence of Mot and often blame Leo for the trouble Mot causes.

Aunt Zelda (Valentine Quintin): Sister of Leo's mother, Aunt Zelda is an abrasive and domineering woman with an implicitly large shape. Whilst she often spends her appearances bullying and looking down on Leo's father, she is also desperate to get married in her own right.

The Neighbor: Leo's neighbour, an elderly woman with her hair in tight curls, who constantly seeks to discover what exactly he is hiding from her. She spies on Leo and Mot using binoculars and by hiding behind hedges, trash cans and such. Unfortunately due to her record of unfounded complaints the police no longer take her phone calls seriously and Mot and Leo travel unabated.

== Comics ==
The original comic created by Alfonso Azpiri was the basis for the animated series. A previously orange Mot would teleport Leo to parallel Universes, where they would confront various, usually threatening, situations before returning Home. Mot was published in El Pequeño País, a supplement of the Spanish newspaper El País. In France, the comic was published from 1988 to 1993. With five volumes being produced, Alfonso stopped work on the highly successful 'Mot the Monster'.

T.1. Monster. Publication date: 1991. Leo is confronted by a 'Monster' in his Closet, Mot over eager to make a new friend causes much havoc and destruction through Leo's House. Mot approaches Leo offering to take him travelling through time and space. At the end of this Volume Leo is left speculating whether or not he dreamt Mot up, and his parents try to convince him to see a psychiatrist.

T.2. The Collector. Publication date: 1991. Mot Takes Leo to the big city, a multitude of lights, sound, machinery and people convince Leo that they won't have an adventure this time. But things are not always what they seem.

T.3. The Green Ireland. Publication Date: 1992. Mot and Leo are confronted by Banshees, Leprechauns and Merlin the Wizard in this Volume. They learn of the pot of gold at the end of the rainbow, the sad songs of the Banshee and how Stonehenge made its way to its current location, all of this does not come easily though.

T.4. New York, New York. Publication Date: 1992. Mot and Leo find themselves in New York, where Mot is free to be Himself. But is that always a good thing? "Oh my friend, we are in the capital of the world. We are in New York ... The only city in the world where I does not attract attention in the street! This will help us in the search for my shadow".

T.5. Never Plus. Publication date: 1993. In this delicious tale, Mot and Leo are surrounded by Fairies, Pirates and Indians, all trying to bid for Mot's "attention".
