= Romulo Royo =

Spanish artist (born 1976)

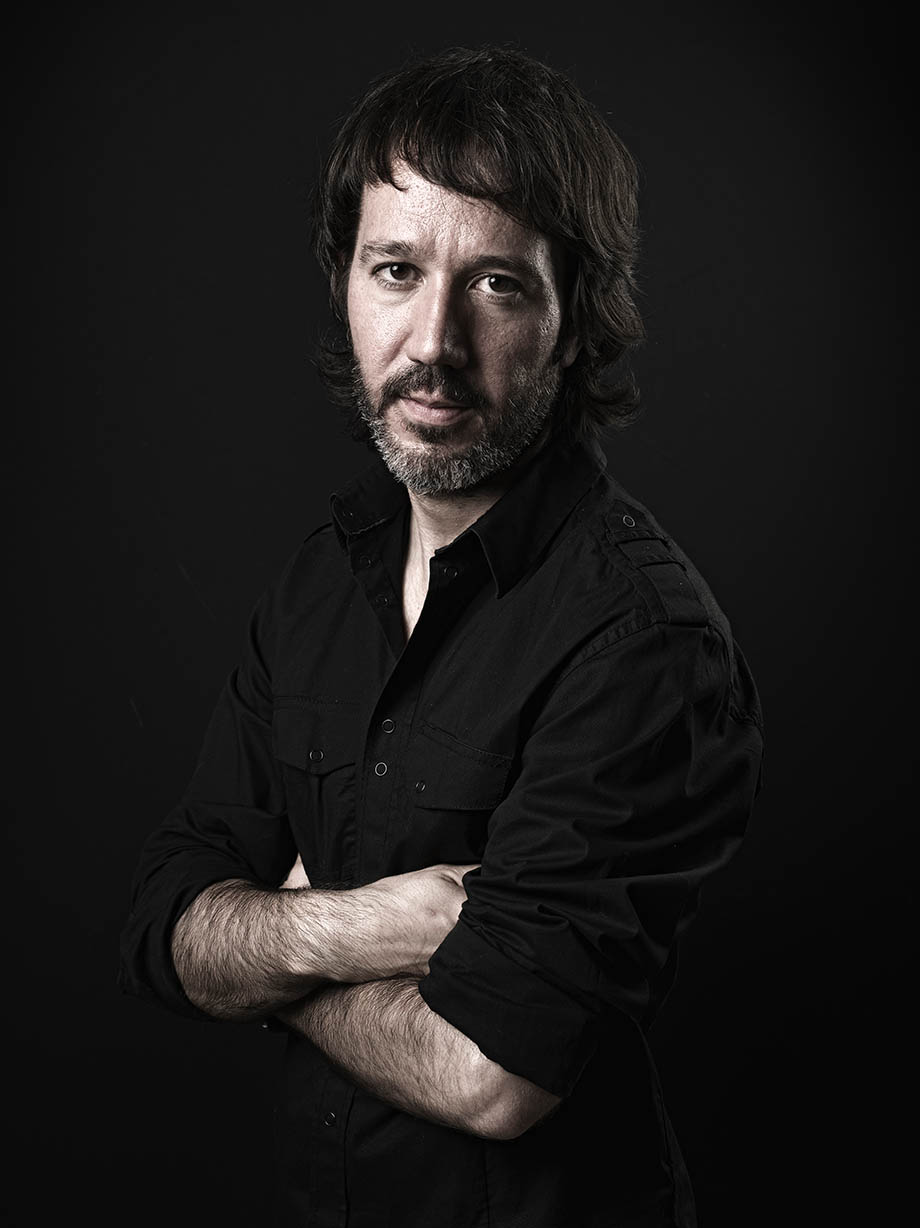
- Romulo Royo
- Born: 1976 (age 49–50); Zaragoza, Spain
- Known for: Painter
- Website: romuloroyo.com

Romulo Royo is a figurative fantasy painter born in 1976 in Zaragoza, Spain.

As a multifaceted artist, he has ventured into producing paintings, books, sculptures, drawings, and video installations. His work is inscribed within figurative art and is linked to the fantasy genre, often associated with Fantasy Art, which stands out for including dreamlike or unreal elements, that came from the imagination within figuartivism. He has transferred this genre of current and personal character to the world of contemporary painting which began to be more recurrent in 2005 with a personal and different vision. This genre is related to the world of illustration and comics of the 70's and 80's or the science fiction cinema of those years.

The theme of his work narrates fantastic worlds that take us to dreamlike places sometimes apocalyptic, his work has a halo of mystery where the female figure is recurrent as the protagonist of the scene. In his work there is a duality that arises between good and evil, energy or mysticism.

His work within realism escapes from reality to capture the non-existent. Often there are symbolic elements from different cultures that he decontextualizes in his representation.

Attracted by imaginary universes and timeless spaces, Romulo Royo seeks to immerse himself in enigmatic places, far from everyday reality. His work, besides being exhibited in international fairs, galleries and museums, has been transferred to various supports of popular culture, such as illustration books, graphic novels, puzzles, figurines, etc.

== Biography ==
After studying Graphic Design and Illustration at the School of Arts and later History at the Faculty of Philosophy, which he abandoned, he founded Group 3, based on performances and communiqués. He found his first influences in H.R. Giger, Anselm Kiefer or Jodorowsky.

In the beginning, from 1995 to 1999 he made illustrations for the publishing house Norma Editorial. His work was published internationally as covers of novel and comic magazines for publishers, Eura Editoriale (Italy), Rad Moskbay (Russia), and Bastei (Germany).

In 2000, Romulo Royo began his career in painting, exhibiting his work in museums such as Museo Pablo Serrano, Museo Provincial de Huesca, and Museo Provincial de Teruel. He exhibited in the Meta Project that travels through Valencia, La Coruña (Spain), Verona, Milan (Italy), Frankfurt (Germany), and Tokyo (Japan). Since then, his work has been exhibited in private galleries, foundations, museums, and international fairs, such as Art Forum Berlin, FIAC, Art Basel Miami, Los Angeles Art Show, and ARCO Madrid.

Some of his works were presented in series, such as Siamese, which has a connection with S&M fetishism in elements that appear in his paintings and where he talks about the individual and collective and their duality.

Other more recent series such as "Goddesses of Nibiru" and "Flowers and Thorns", where he relates fantastic worlds and beings such as Irkalla or the planet Nibiru, where he combines realism with mystery and elevates to a symbolic plane of the tattoos or mythological elements that he decontextualizes from their function. They were exhibited at the Museum of Modern Art (Ljubljana), Can Framis Museum, XXV Biennale of Alexandria in the Alexandria National Museum, the Maeztu Museum of Estella, the 4th Biennale of Contemporary Art in Moscow and Centre d'Art Santa Mònica.

The combined works of Romulo Royo and Luis Royo began in 2006, where they captured their art in the Medvedev dome of 24 meters in diameter in Moscow. The whole process of this work is published in the book Dome. In 2008, he collaborated again with Luis Royo to make large format paintings that were collected in the book titled Dead Moon. From that book, in 2010, the work titled “Llegará el día” was published in Spectrum XVIII, The Best in Contemporary Fantasy Art.

Romulo Royo makes creations such as Demons, and the complex multimedia project Malefic Time, where luz deals with an apocalyptic universe where a civilization decimated in its inhabitants, decrepit and ruinous, and tries to survive before Annunakis fights to wage the final battle. At the heart of this fatal scenario: Luz, her sword Malefic, and her many questions occupy the protagonist of the plot. The project gathers several books with paintings, illustrations and scripts of international circulation, the book Malefic Time, Apocalypse is presented for the first time at the Salon del comic of Barcelona published by Norma Editorial. Later, the book was published by Bragelonne (France), Rizzoli Lizard (Italy), and Cross Cult (Germany), and presented at fairs such as the Frankfurt Book Fair and the Guadalajara International Book Fair.

Other formats to which the series arrives are the novel Codex Apocalypse written by Jesus Vilches, the manga Soum, by Kenny Ruiz, and the music group Avalanch, composed an album of characters and sequences of the Malefic Time universe with international tours and live painting shows.

Romulo Royo's work has been exhibited in solo and group exhibitions in galleries in the United States and Europe, including Kavachnina Contemporary in Miami, have been auctioned in auction houses such as Christie's Paris and Brussels, Ketterer Kunst, Munich, Galartis Switzerland, organized by The Womanity Foundation, and in previously mentioned fairs such as Art Miami, CIGE Beijing China, ART International Istanbul, ARCO Madrid, etc. and fantasy fairs such as Fantasy Basel, New York Comic-Con.

In 2023, he exhibited "Art Generations", curated by Mauro Bruni, at the Palazzo Ducale at the Lucca Comics & Games Fair.

The following year, his work was exhibited at the Museum of Modern European Art MEAM, with the exhibition "The Dream of Fantasy".

In February 2025, The Guide Artists publishes a monographic volume that covers Romulo Royo’s artistic career to date that includes his main series, exhibitions and collaborations.

== Career ==
He studied classics such as Rubens and Velázquez. But after seeing the film New York Stories, composed of three short stories, specifically Life Lessons, he knew that he wanted to be a painter. He studied at the School of Arts, Graphic Design and Illustration and later History at the Faculty of Philosophy, which he abandoned to create an artistic group called Grupo 3, together with Raul Navarro and Yago de Mateo, based on Dadaist performances and communiqués. At the same time, he made illustrations and commissions that were published internationally as covers of the series John Sinclair, Maddrax, Vampira (Germany), and Lanciostory and Skorpio (Italy). In 2000, he began his career as a painter in the contemporary art circuit, exhibiting his first solo exhibition in Barcelona.
