= Collapse (2008 video game) =

- Developer: Creoteam
- Publisher: Buka Entertainment
- Composer: NewTone
- Platform: Windows
- Release: RU: September 25, 2008; WW: April 11, 2014
- Genres: Action-adventure, third-person shooter, hack and slash
- Mode: Single-player

Collapse (Ukrainian: Kолапс, also known as Collapse: Devastated World) is an action game released in 2008 for Windows. It was developed by Creoteam, a company based in Ukraine. The game is notable for combining quick time events and sword battles similar to God of War series, third-person shooting, and a setting similar to S.T.A.L.K.E.R.: Shadow of Chernobyl. The soundtrack was composed by the Russian electronic band NewTone.

== Gameplay ==
Rodan (left) fighting a boss, Yakir

The gameplay is divided into sections where a player is encouraged to use either swords or guns. The shooting section is similar to many third-person shooters, while the close-range combat is similar to the God of War series. Boss battles are usually finished using quick time events. Many of the locations in the game are based on real-life Kyiv places, such as Maidan Nezalezhnosti and Kyiv Pechersk Lavra.

== Plot ==
The story is set in 2096 in Kyiv, Ukraine, a city that turned into the center of the Zone. The Zone was created after a strange interdimensional rift opened, leading the city and all surrounding areas to be infested with outwardly beasts and dangerous anomalies. The rift became known as the Hole. To stop the spread of the Zone, a quarantine was declared, and all the inhabitants of the place became hostages. At first, the Zone was controlled by scientists and militia, but due to monster attacks and strong aggression from the locals, the Zone soon became divided between various bandit clans led by so-called Lords. The city itself and surrounding area of the Zone became known as the Junkyard.

Rodan, the main hero of the story, is a Lord of one such clan, who is going to participate in a meeting of Lords. The meeting turns out to be a trap by Lord Mark, the leader of a clan of fanatics who worship him as a messiah. Rodan is forced to fight back with his swords, various weaponry and telekinetic powers granted by the Zone's anomalous power. He soon finds out that there is much more to worry about than just a new clan war, as he is forced to confront an enigmatic and powerful man whose ambition threatens not only to safety of the Zone, but to the whole world outside. During his journey, Rodan also has to uncover the mystery of his past and the secret of the inter-dimensional rift, the Hole itself.

== Development ==
A patch was released, updating game to version 1.1. The patch fixed most of the problems with gameplay balance and bring some new effects to the game. It was recommended to download the patch, as it improves the game.

== Collapse: The Rage ==
A stand-alone expansion entitled Collapse: The Rage (Ukrainian: Колапс: Лють; Russian: Коллапс: Ярость) was released in 2010 (only in CIS). It continues the story of Rodan after the destruction of the Hole. The features include improved ranged and close combat mechanics, new special effects and the "Rage" mode.

== Reception ==
The game received mixed reviews from critics. Igray.ru praised the characters, gameplay animations, NPC behavior and sound design. 7Wolf Magazine criticized the game for having a number of bugs and derivative game mechanics reminiscient of God of War and Devil May Cry. IGROMANIA praised the combination of melee and gun combat, but criticized the story for being derivative and uninteresting.
