= Basket Master =

1987 video game

- Developers: Dinamic, Imagine
- Publishers: Dinamic, Imagine
- Platforms: Windows, Commodore 64, ZX Spectrum
- Release: 1987

Basket Master is the European version name of the computer basketball game Fernando Martín Basket Master developed by Dinamic during 1987. Some versions, like C64 one, were developed by Imagine.

It features Fernando Martín, a popular Spanish basketballer in the eighties. He was the first Spaniard who played in the NBA.
