= Alfonso Azpiri =

Spanish comic book artist (1947–2017)

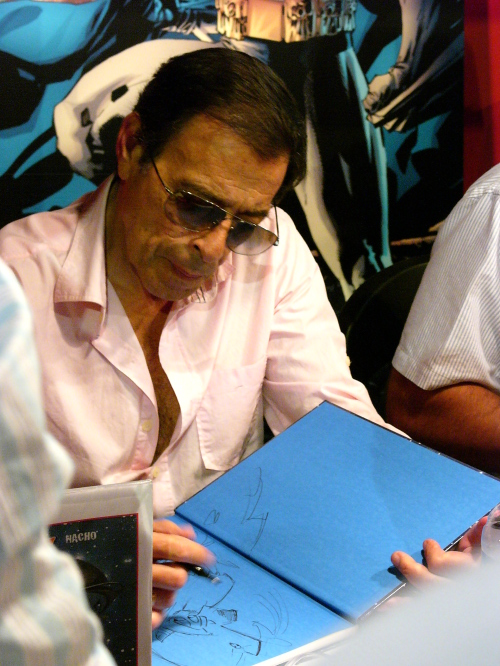
- Azpiri at a book signing
- Born: Alfonso Azpiri Mejía; 17 January 1947 Madrid, Spain
- Died: 18 August 2017 (aged 70)
- Areas: Cartoonist, Writer, Artist

Alfonso Azpiri Mejía (17 January 1947 − 18 August 2017) was a Spanish comic book artist known for creating mainly adult-themed comics.

== Biography ==
Azpiri was born in Madrid. His early work was published in the 1970s and was mainly aimed at the Italian market which then welcomed stories containing a mixture of horror, sex and nudity. Azpiri's work, drawn in a comical style, featured amply breasted women getting involved with werewolves, mummies, vampires and the Frankenstein monster.

His work has been translated and published in a number of magazines, including Heavy Metal and Penthouse Comix. His style is easily recognisable, especially his lavishly elegant and sensual, pouting females. He has been mainly involved in the science fiction and fantasy genre, often with a decidedly erotic slant. His fantasy stories range from sword and sorcery to the 1001 Arabian Nights type. He also raises the issue of conflict between peoples, such as in science fiction stories where the inhabitants of soon-to-be colonised planets are massacred so that humans from Earth can move in.

One of his most recurring characters is Lorna, a Barbarella-like space adventurer who travels the galaxy accompanied by two droids, the R2-D2-like ADL and the C-3PO-like Arnold. Arnold's main function is to satisfy the ever-passionate Lorna whenever there are no human males, females or suitably endowed aliens available. Lorna`s principal enemy, the crime lord Mouse, bears some resemblance to Jabba the Hutt.

Less adult-oriented, and suitable for younger readers, was Mot, the adventures of a boy called Leo who finds himself plagued by a large, friendly but cumbersome and destructive monster. This was turned into a cartoon series and broadcast on France's Canal Plus.

Azpiri's other productions include Chang, telling the adventures of a martial artist and detective.

Both Lorna and Mot were featured in video games, Lorna by Topo Soft and Mot by Opera Soft.

In 2012 he collaborated with the comic book Hero Seeds, drawing two covers of the comics and several drawings in the same comics.

== English bibliography ==
- Black Hawk (in Tornado, 1979–80)
- Reflections (1993)
- Sensations (2000, art book)
- Wet Dreams (2001)
- Wet Dreams II: The Players (2006)

Lorna

- Lorna and Her Robot (1981)
- The New Adventures of Lorna and Her Robot (1984)
- Mouse Club (1996)
- Leviathan (1998)
- The Ark (1999)
- The Eye of Dart an Gor (2006)
- The Black Castle (2008)

Bethlehem Steele (in Penthouse Comix, 1994–1995)

- Pirate Hearts (by Garry Leach)
- Tanaka
- Slave Wars
- Sweet Torture (gallery)
- Beth Meets Lorna
