= Ixo (company) =

French media conglomerate

- Type: Public
- Industry: Publishing, web content
- Founded: 2000
- Defunct: 2004
- Headquarters: France
- Key people: Christophe Sapet

Ixo (sometimes stylized as IXO) was a French media conglomerate established in September 2000 as a corporate spin-off of the company InfoSources. It was led by businessman Christophe Sapet, co-founder of Infogrames.

InfoSources, which Sapet had started as an Internet service provider in 1995, had branched increasingly into content creation since 1998, and had purchased the magazine publishers Pressimage and Freeway in April 2000. As a result, its holdings included a number of youth-oriented magazines and web portals, such as ZoneJeuX. As part of InfoSources' merger with Belgacom, its content division was split off as Ixo, which successfully went public in December 2000.

Ixo became the French publisher of Rolling Stone in 2002. That same year, Ixo began a rebranding effort to target "urban machismo" in its publications. Following a years-long series of setbacks that Stratégies described as a "descent into hell", Ixo filed for bankruptcy in January 2004. Its magazine publishing division was sold off piecemeal to companies such as Cyber Press Publishing and Tests Group as the year progressed. Because it was sold in pieces, over 100 Ixo employees were laid off. The liquidation of Ixo was announced in July 2004, after the firm was unable to find a buyer for the remainder of its business.

== Publications ==
=== GameLive PC ===
Ixo served as the publisher of the video game magazine GameLive PC, which began circulating in Spain during October 2000. It averaged a circulation of 30,000 copies per issue during its first two years, according to France's Circulation Audit Office, and by 2002 Ixo stated that it was Spain's second-largest computer game magazine. A French edition launched on March 29, 2003, initially as a quarterly release. It switched to a monthly schedule in France after its third issue, by which time its national circulation had reached 60,000 copies, Ixo reported.

GameLive PC received praise from outlets such as MeriStation, whose writer Francisco Alberto Serrano remarked that it "overshadowed even a magazine so settled in Spain as the dean Micromanía". Similarly, VidaExtra's César Saiz called it "one of the best magazines about video games" in Spain. Each issue of GameLive featured the full version of a game via pack-in CD-ROM. In Spain, the magazine ended suddenly in December 2004, after running for 45 issues. It was one of several closures in the country's print game magazine industry during the period. Key members of GameLive PC went on to found the magazine PC Life.
