= FX Interactive =

Spanish video game publisher

- Company type: Video game development; Video game publisher
- Industry: Video games
- Founded: June 1, 1999; 25 years ago
- Founder: Nacho Ruiz Tejedor
- Headquarters: Madrid, Spain
- Parent: Haemimont Games
- Website: www.fxinteractive.com

FX Interactive is a Spanish video game publisher founded in 1999. It published Navy Moves, and FX Fútbol. The Ruiz brothers are important video game developers in Spain, having been the founders of Dinamic Software.

In 2014 the publisher stopped paying its employees. In 2015 it suffered an economic crisis. As of 2018, it is on the verge of economic failure. In May 2017 and after having been the subject of several convictions for non-payments, the company is finally declared insolvent by the 24th Social Court of Madrid after accumulating a debt of more than 54,000 euros. By 2021 it was revived.
