= Dinamic Software =

Spanish video game company

- Industry: Video game industry
- Founded: 1984
- Fate: Bankruptcy
- Headquarters: Spain

Dinamic Software is a Spanish video game producer and publishing company. It was founded in 1984, and its activity ceased in 1992, comprising the Golden Era of Spanish Software. One year later, a part of its owners founded an independent company named Dinamic Multimedia. At the end of the 1980s, another company, Aventuras AD, who began to produce text adventures, was born from Dinamic Software.

== History ==
At the beginning of the 1980s, young brothers Pablo, Nacho and Victor Ruiz had their first contact with computers. In the case of Victor Ruiz, he started with a Sinclair ZX81, creating some amateur self-made games. On their first attempt as a company, they created NCM, which would later become Dinamic. Their original idea was simply to create a team of programmers, as they never thought that it would start such an intense commercial activity.

On their first months, they created themselves all the code, recorded themselves the programs on tape, designed and printed boxes and manuals, and distributed them, as well as designing their ads to publish them on newspapers and magazines. Their official debut was Yenght, a text adventure with graphics for ZX Spectrum, and Artist, a graphic design program, both released in 1984, but its first commercial success would come with the release of Saimazoom, later in 1984, which would start a trilogy, followed by Babaliba and Abu Simbel Profanation.

In 1986, Victor Ruiz would create Camelot Warriors, and the same year he would start the "Moves" trilogy, with Army Moves in 1986, followed by Navy Moves in 1988. In 1991, Arctic Moves was designed to be published for the Atari ST, but this version was not released due to Dinamic's bankruptcy. The game would be redesigned for PC and published in 1995 by Dinamic Multimedia.

After Fernando Martin Basket Master became one of the most successful Spanish video games to date, they started a tradition to hire famous people, mainly sportsmen, to back their video games, something imitated by the rest of the Spanish companies at the time, and later by themselves, with the release of Aspar GP Master and Míchel Fútbol Master Super Skills.

1987 proved to be their most active year. They released one of the most commercially successful text adventures in Spain, Don Quijote, based on the cartoon series released at the time, both of which are based on the early 17th century novel by Miguel de Cervantes. With it they created the trademark Aventuras Dinamic which would be dedicated entirely on text adventures. However, text adventures, with or without graphics, eventually proved to be commercially unsuccessful in the Spanish market, and Aventuras Dinamic was bought by Andrés Samudio, so he could create Aventuras AD, on the condition that he would produce the games, but Dinamic had to distribute them, and so it was.

Other titles with massive Spanish and international distribution were Game Over, and Phantis (this one released in the United Kingdom as Game Over II). Their covers included girls with sexy corsets, which were heavily censored outside Spain. It is specially remembered in the case of Game Over where a nipple was visible, and was covered in the UK with the Dinamic logo, a screen capture or directly with a redrawn corset in subsequent editions. Other successful titles by Dinamic were Freddy Hardest (1987) and its sequel Freddy Hardest In South Manhattan (1989), Turbo Girl (1988), and After the War (1989).

During the Golden age of Spanish software, Dinamic distributed their own games in Spain, as well as the ones by Aventuras AD and other minor companies, becoming a rival to Erbe Software in this work, but with the change of decade and the migration to 16-bit platforms, sales of 8-bit computer games plummeted and after launching Narco Police (1991), Dinamic became unable to distribute their titles any longer. That year, Dinamic partnered with Imagine Software, a subsidiary of Ocean Software to distribute its titles outside of Spain, but the relationship was short-lived.

Their last title, Risky Woods, could be released, exclusively for 16-bit platforms, thanks to co-production with Zeus Software, and distribution by Electronic Arts, since Dinamic Software was already immersed in an economical crisis that would lead to its closedown in bankruptcy in 1992. One year later, the Ruiz brothers, with Carlos Abril (one of the designers of Phantis) and the owner of HobbyPress, José Ignacio Gómez-Centurión, would create a new company, which was named Dinamic Multimedia in honor of the defunct company, but would only be owned on a 30% by the Ruiz Brothers.

In September 2024 it was announced the reboot Army Moves Overdrive, sequel of Army Moves, and it was released the next year. In April 2025 it was announced Freddy Hardest 2, developed by Dinamic and GameZ, which will be released in 2026.

== List of titles ==
- Abu Simbel Profanation
- After The War
- Astro Marine Corps
- Arctic Moves
- Army Moves
- Arquímedes XXI
- Artist
- Aspar GP Master
- Babaliba
- Bestial Warrior
- Bestial Warrior, Gunstick
- Bronx
- Buggy Ranger
- Camelot Warriors
- Capitán Sevilla
- Cobra's Arc
- Comando Tracer/The Last Commando
- Cosmic Sheriff
- Don Quijote
- Dustin
- El Capitán Trueno
- Fernando Martín Basket Master
- Freddy Hardest
- Freddy Hardest in South Manhattan (published as Guardian Angel outside Spain)
- Game Over
- Game Over II (published as Phantis in Spain)
- Hammer Boy
- Hundra
- La guerra de las vajillas
- Mapsnatch
- Megacorp
- Meganova
- Megaphoenix
- Lo mejor de Dinamic
- Míchel Fútbol Master Super Skills
- Narco Police
- Navy Moves
- Nonamed
- Olé toro
- Los pájaros de Bangkok
- PC Fútbol
- Phantomas
- Phantomas 2
- Risky Woods
- Rocky (also published as Rocco)
- Saimazoom
- Satan
- Simulador profesional de tenis
- Sgrizam
- Turbo Girl
- Videolimpic
- West Bank
- Yenght
