= Luis Royo =

Spanish artist (born 1954)

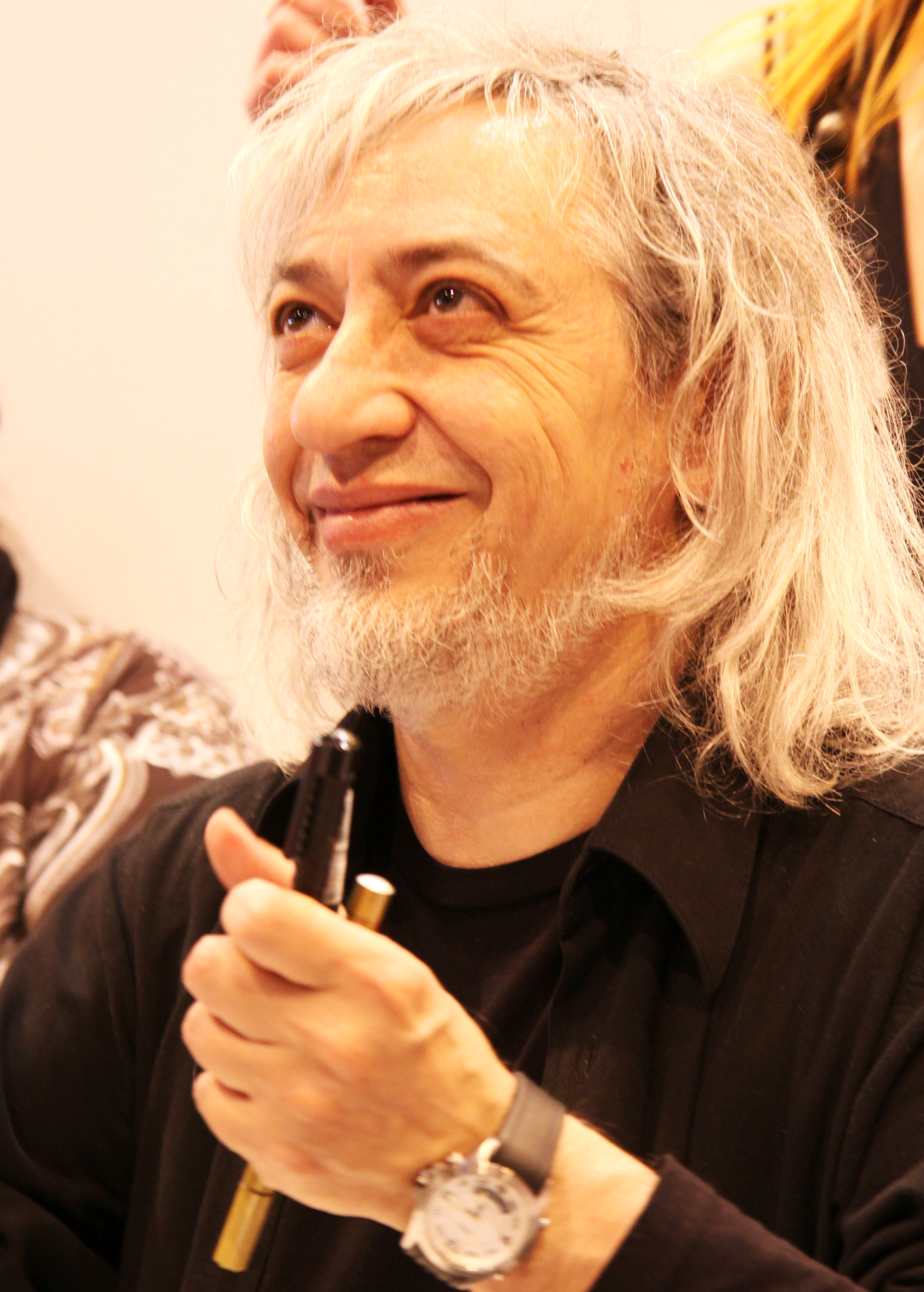
- Luis Royo at the 2010 Paris Book Fair
- Born: 1954 (age 71–72); Olalla, Teruel, Spain
- Education: La Escuela de Artes Aplicados
- Known for: Illustration
- Notable work: Dead Moon; Prohibited Book; Malefic
- Website: luisroyo.com

Luis Royo (born 1954) is a Spanish artist. He is best known for his fantasy illustrations published in numerous art books, magazines such as Heavy Metal and various other media including book and music CD covers, video games and Tarot cards.

Beginning his career as a furniture designer, he was attracted to the comics industry in the late 1970s by the work of artists like Enki Bilal and Moebius, and in 1979 he turned to art as a full-time career. Within a few years, he was publishing art within and on the covers of such magazines as Comix Rambla Internacional, El Vibora, Heavy Metal, National Lampoon, and Comic Art as well as providing cover illustrations for several American publishers.

== Biography ==
Royo was born in Olalla, a village in the Aragonese province of Teruel.

In 1983, Royo began working as an illustrator for publishers in the United States such as Tor Books, Berkley Books, Avon and Bantam Books.

As his reputation grew, other publishers contacted Royo and he created custom covers for novels and magazines for Ballantine Books, NAL, DAW Books, Doubleday (publisher), HarperCollins, Zendra, Hasa Corporation, Penthouse Comix, Pocket Books with Star Trek: Voyager series and Battlestar Galactica novels, also Fleer for Ultra X-Men by Marvel.

An ongoing collaboration with Heavy Metal produced a large number of magazine covers including the 20th anniversary issue in 1997. Illustrations for the character F.A.A.K. were based on actress Julie Strain.

Royo's other well-known covers for fantasy and science fiction titles of this period included Robots and Empire by Isaac Asimov, Conan by Robert E. Howard, 2010: Odyssey Two by Arthur C. Clarke and StarMan and Wayfarer Redemption saga by Sara Douglass among others.

Women, Royo's first art book was published in 1992. It brings together many of his cover illustrations up to that date into one volume. His second book, Malefic, was published in 1994 and was dedicated to fantasy and science fiction imagery. This was followed in 1996 by Secrets, which was dedicated to erotism. Later art books, (III Millennium, Evolution, Visions and Dark Labyrinth) explored the same genres combining science fiction, apocalyptic worlds and myths of beauty and the beast, but received criticism for their explicit content.

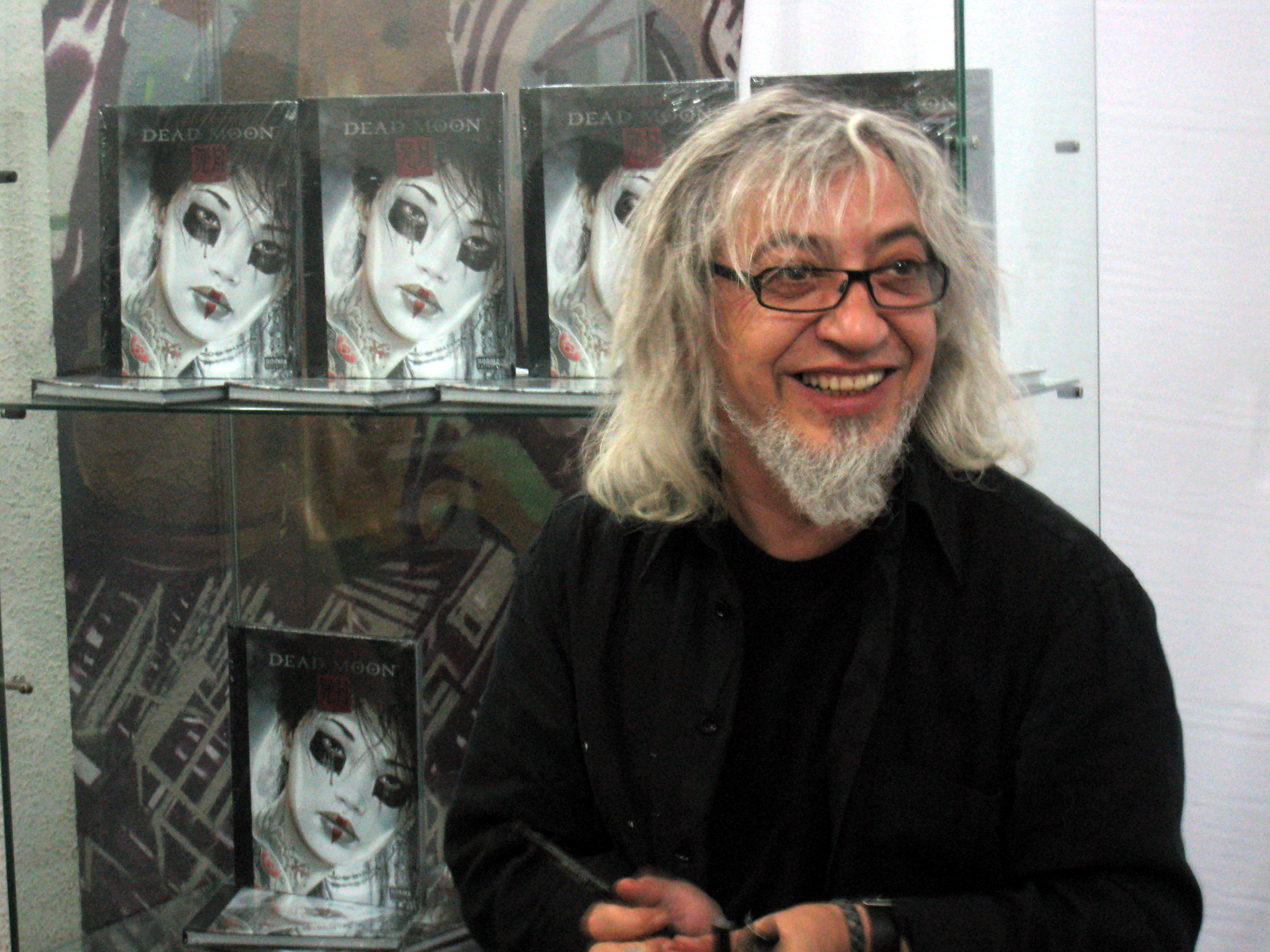
Luis Royo and "Dead Moon" books

In 2006, joined by Romulo Royo, Luis Royo traveled to Moscow to complete a commission to paint a fresco on a domed ceiling, reflecting classic themes of eroticism. The process and result of this work was published in another art book, Dome.

Royo began to work on Dead Moon in 2009, a project with an oriental theme. This produced two art books, Dead Moon and Dead Moon: Epilogue that tell a love story. Royo also designed a tarot deck using the Dead Moon theme. The original paintings were exhibited at Salón del Manga de Barcelona, ExpoManga and retail store Fnac.

In 2011, Luis and Romulo Royo started a multimedia project, Malefic Time, that included illustrated novels, a role playing game, figures based on illustrations, calendars and other spin-offs.

Royo worked with George R. R. Martin in 2014 to produce illustrations for Martin's novelette, "The Ice Dragon".

In 2018, he published the chest Projects with two books: Goddesses and Custom-Made, compiling his last works and projects.

Among his latest exhibitions are "Art Generations" at the Palazzo Ducale in the walled city of Lucca, organized by the Lucca Comics & Games fair, the exhibition space with more prestige worldwide dedicated to fantasy, "The Dream of Fantasy" at the European Museum of Modern Art (MEAM) in Barcelona, and "Komorebi Eterno: Japan through Fantasy Art" at the Spanish-Japanese Cultural Center of Salamanca.

As a culmination of his artistic career, the Uffizi Gallery (Florence, Italy) has requested his self-portrait to add it to its collection.

== Awards and exhibitions ==
In 1994 Penthouse magazine reported on Royo's work and later in 1996, one of his images was used on the cover of the American and German editions, both with an interior report. In the same year he received the Spectrum silver award for best contemporary fantastic art. Reports on his work also appeared in other publications: La Stampa in Italy, Airbrush Action in the United States and Penthouse Comic in Germany.

In 1998 Royo exhibited at the Norma Gallery in Barcelona and at the Viñetas desde o Atlántico comic festival in A Coruña. He received the Millennium Prize at the 7th Salone del Fumetto Cartoomics convention in Milan in 2000. He also exhibited his work in St. Petersburg in 2001 and received the El Peregrino fantasy award at CTPAHHNK.

In 2006 Royo exhibited his work at the 24th Barcelona comic fair. He also received the Unicorn fantasy award at the 7th International Fantasy and Terror Film Week in Málaga.

Royo won the Inkpot Award at San Diego Comic-Con in 2015.

== Bibliography ==
- 1985 – Circulus-Sataka (Comic book)
- 1986 – Desfase (Experimental comic book)
- 1992 – Women (Original title Femmes)
- 1994 – Malefic
- 1996 – Secrets
- 1998 – III Millennium
- 1999 – Dreams
- 1999 – Prohibited Book
- 2000 – Evolution
- 2001 – Art Fantastix: The Art of Luis Royo
- 2001 – Prohibited Book II
- 2002 – Conceptions I
- 2003 – Conceptions II
- 2003 – Prohibited Book III
- 2003 – Visions
- 2004 – Antología I – 1979–1982
- 2004 – Fantastic Art
- 2004 – The Labyrinth: Tarot
- 2004 – Prohibited Sketchbook
- 2005 – Conceptions III
- 2005 – Subversive Beauty
- 2006 – Antología II – 1981–1983
- 2006 – Dark Labyrinth
- 2006 – Wild Sketches I
- 2006 – Wild Sketches II
- 2007 – Dome
- 2008 – Wild Sketches III
- 2009 – Dead Moon
- 2009 – Malefic: Remastered
- 2010 – Dead Moon: Epilogue
- 2010 – Prohibited Book (Omnibus edition)
- 2011 – Malefic Time: Apocalypse
- 2012 – Malefic Time: Codex Apocalypse
- 2012 – Malefic Time: Soum
- 2014 – Malefic Time 2: 110 Katanas
- 2014 – The Ice Dragon (Illustrated edition of a novelette by George R. R. Martin)
- 2016 – Malefic Time: Akelarre
- 2018 – Projects: Goddesses & Custom-Made

An extensive collection of derived works has also been published, including calendars, collectible cards, and portfolios.
