= List of video games developed in Spain =

This is a list of video games developed in Spain, sortable by title, platform, year, developer or publisher.

Title	Platform	Year	Developer	Publisher	Citations
"Destroyer".	Arcade	1980	Ferran Yago (EFO SA)	Cidelsa	
"Altair I / II".	Arcade	1981	Ferran Yago (EFO SA)	Cidelsa	
"Draco".	Arcade	1981	Ferran Yago (EFO SA)	Cidelsa	
"Night Mare (Clean Octopus)".	Arcade	1981	Ferran Yago (EFO SA)	Playmatic	
Bugaboo (The Flea)	ZX Spectrum, Commodore 64, MSX, Amstrad CPC	1983	Paco & Paco	Quicksilva	
Babaliba	ZX Spectrum	1984	Dinamic Software	Dinamic Software	
Saimazoom	MSX, ZX Spectrum	1984	Dinamic Software	Dinamic Software	
Yenght	ZX Spectrum	1984	Dinamic Software	Dinamic Software	
Abu Simbel, Profanation	Amstrad CPC, ZX Spectrum, MSX	1985	Dinamic Software	Dinamic Software	
Camelot Warriors	Amstrad CPC, Commodore 64, MSX, ZX Spectrum	1985	Dinamic Software	Dinamic Software	
Army Moves	Amiga, Amstrad CPC, Atari ST, Commodore 64, MS-DOS, MSX, ZX Spectrum	1986	Dinamic Software	Imagine Software	
Conquestador	Amstrad CPC, MSX, ZX Spectrum	1986	Erbe Software	Erbe Software	
El Misterio del Nilo	Amstrad CPC, Commodore 64, MSX, ZX Spectrum	1986	Made in Spain	Zigurat Software	
Nonamed	Amstrad CPC, MSX, ZX Spectrum	1986	Dinamic Software	Dinamic Software	
Livingstone, I Presume?	Amstrad CPC, Amstrad PCW, Atari ST, Commodore 64, DOS, MSX, ZX Spectrum	1986	Opera Soft	Opera Soft	
Sir Fred	Amstrad CPC, MSX, ZX Spectrum	1986	Made in Spain	Mikro-Gen	
"The Burning Cavern".	Arcade (Magnet System)	1987	Ferran Yago (EFO SA)	EFO SA	
"Paris Dakar".	Arcade (Magnet System)	1987	Ferran Yago (EFO SA)	EFO SA	
"War Mission".	Arcade (Magnet System)	1987	Ferran Yago (EFO SA)	EFO SA	
"A Day In Space".	Arcade (Magnet System)	1987	Ferran Yago (EFO SA)	EFO SA	
Don Quijote	Amstrad CPC, Commodore 64, MS-DOS, MSX, ZX Spectrum	1987	Dinamic Software	Dinamic Software	
Emilio Butragueño Fútbol	Amstrad CPC, Commodore 64, MS-DOS, MSX, ZX Spectrum	1987	Topo Soft	DROsoft	
La Abadía del Crimen	Amstrad CPC, MSX, MS-DOS, ZX Spectrum	1987	Opera Soft	Opera Soft	
The Last Mission	ZX Spectrum, Amstrad CPC, Amstrad PCW, MSX, MS-DOS	1987	Opera Soft	Opera Soft	
Basket Master	MS-DOS, Commodore 64, ZX Spectrum	1987	Dinamic Software	Dinamic Software	
Game Over	Amstrad CPC, Commodore 64, MSX, Thomson TO7, ZX Spectrum	1987	Dinamic Software	Imagine Software	
Game Over II	Amstrad CPC, Atari ST, Commodore 64, MS-DOS, MSX, ZX Spectrum	1987	Dinamic Software	Dinamic Software	
Spirits	Amstrad CPC, MSX, ZX Spectrum	1987	Topo Soft	Topo Soft	
Stardust	ZX Spectrum, Amstrad CPC, MS-DOS, MSX	1987	Topo Soft	Topo Soft, Kixx	
Survivor	Amstrad CPC, MSX, ZX Spectrum	1987	Topo Soft	Topo Soft	
Abracadabra	Amstrad CPC, MSX, ZX Spectrum	1988	Odisea Software	Proein	
Capitán Sevilla	Amstrad CPC, MSX, ZX Spectrum	1988	Hi-Score	Dinamic Software, Winner	
Goody	Amstrad CPC, MS-DOS, ZX Spectrum, MSX	1988	Gonzalo Suárez Girard	Opera Soft	
Hundra	Amstrad CPC, MSX, ZX Spectrum	1988	Zeus Software	Dinamic Software	
Navy Moves	Amiga, Amstrad CPC, Atari ST, Commodore 64, MS-DOS, MSX, ZX Spectrum	1988	Dinamic Software	Dinamic Software	
Sol Negro	Amiga, Amstrad CPC, Amstrad PCW, Atari ST, MS-DOS, MSX, ZX Spectrum	1988	Opera Soft	Opera Soft	
A.M.C.: Astro Marine Corps	Amiga, Atari ST, Commodore 64, ZX Spectrum, MSX, Amstrad CPC	1989	Creepsoft	Dinamic Software	
After the War	Amiga, Atari ST, Commodore 64, ZX Spectrum, MSX, Amstrad CPC, MS-DOS, Arcade	1989	Dinamic Software	Dinamic Software	
Jabato	ZX Spectrum, Amstrad CPC, Commodore 64, MSX, Atari ST, Amiga, MS-DOS	1989	Aventuras AD	Aventuras AD	
La Aventura Original	Amiga, Amstrad CPC, Atari ST, Commodore 64, MS-DOS, MSX, ZX Spectrum	1989	Aventuras AD	Aventuras AD	
Livingstone II	Amiga, Amstrad CPC, Amstrad PCW, Atari ST, MS-DOS, MSX, ZX Spectrum	1989	Opera Soft	Opera Soft	
Mortadelo y Filemón II: Safari callejero	Amstrad CPC, Amstrad PCW, MSX, ZX Spectrum	1989	Animagic	Animagic	
Narco Police	Amiga, Amstrad CPC, Atari ST, Commodore 64, MS-DOS, MSX, PC Booter, ZX Spectrum	1989	Iron Byte	Dinamic Software	
Golden Basket	Amstrad CPC, MS-DOS, MSX, ZX Spectrum	1990	Opera Soft	Opera Soft	
La Aventura Espacial	Amiga, Amstrad CPC, Atari ST, Commodore 64, DOS, MSX, ZX Spectrum	1990	Aventuras AD	Aventuras AD	
Mundial de Fútbol	Amstrad CPC, ZX Spectrum, MSX, MS-DOS	1990	Opera Soft	Opera Soft	
La Diosa de Cozumel	Amiga, Amstrad CPC, Amstrad PCW, Atari ST, Commodore 64, DOS, MSX, ZX Spectrum	1990	Aventuras AD	Aventuras AD	
Big Karnak	Arcade	1991	Gaelco	Gaelco	
Los Templos Sagrados	Amiga, Amstrad CPC, Amstrad PCW, Atari ST, Commodore 64, DOS, ZX Spectrum	1991	Aventuras AD	Aventuras AD	
Chichén Itzá	Amiga, Amstrad CPC, Amstrad PCW, Atari ST, MS-DOS, ZX Spectrum	1992	Aventuras AD	Aventuras AD	
Luigi & Spaghetti	MS-DOS	1992	Topo Soft	Topo Soft	
Risky Woods	Amiga, Atari ST, MS-DOS, Sega Genesis	1992	Dinamic Software, Zeus Software	Electronic Arts	
Simulador Profesional de Fútbol	MS-DOS	1992	Dinamic Software	Grupo Editorial Jackson	
Los Justicieros	Arcade, MS-DOS	1993	Dinamic Multimedia	Dinamic Multimedia, Los Hermanos Zorton	
PC Basket	MS-DOS	1993	Dinamic Multimedia	Dinamic Multimedia	
PC Fútbol	MS-DOS	1993	Dinamic Multimedia	Dinamic Multimedia	
World Rally	Arcade	1993	Zigurat Software	Atari Games, Gaelco, Sigma	
Alligator Hunt	Arcade	1994	Gaelco	Gaelco	
Igor: Objective Uikokahonia	MS-DOS	1994	Pendulo Studios	DROsoft, Optik Software	
PC Basket 2.0	MS-DOS	1994	Dinamic Multimedia	Dinamic Multimedia	
PC Fútbol 3.0	MS-DOS	1994	Dinamic Multimedia	Dinamic Multimedia	
Vital Light	Amiga, Amiga CD32	1994	Efecto Cao	Millennium Interactive	
Arctic Moves	MS-DOS, Atari ST, Amiga	1995	Dinamic Multimedia	Dinamic Multimedia	
Biomechanical Toy	Arcade	1995	Zeus Software	Gaelco	
Delvion: Star Interceptor	MS-DOS	1995	Digital Dreams Multimedia	Digital Dreams Multimedia	
PC Basket 3.0	MS-DOS	1995	Dinamic Multimedia	Dinamic Multimedia	
PC Fútbol 4.0	MS-DOS	1995	Dinamic Multimedia	Dinamic Multimedia	
Speed Haste	MS-DOS	1995	NoriaWorks Entertainment	Friendware	
3 Skulls of the Toltecs	MS-DOS, Microsoft Windows	1996	Revistronic	Warner Interactive Entertainment	
Dráscula: The Vampire Strikes Back	MS-DOS	1996	Alcachofa Soft	Digital Dreams Multimedia	
PC Basket 4.0	MS-DOS	1996	Dinamic Multimedia	Dinamic Multimedia	
PC Fútbol 5.0	Microsoft Windows, MS-DOS	1996	Dinamic Multimedia	Dinamic Multimedia	
Hollywood Monsters	Microsoft Windows	1997	Pendulo Studios	Dinamic Multimedia	
PC Fútbol 6.0	Microsoft Windows	1997	Dinamic Multimedia	Dinamic Multimedia	
Turok: Battle of the Bionosaurs	Game Boy	1997	Bit Managers	Acclaim Entertainment	
Commandos: Behind Enemy Lines	Microsoft Windows	1998	Pyro Studios	Eidos Interactive	
Cosmic Family	Microsoft Windows, Wii	1998	Ubisoft Barcelona	Ubisoft	
Mortadelo y Filemón: El Sulfato Atómico	Microsoft Windows	1998	Alcachofa Soft	Zeta Multimedia	
PC Basket 6.0	Microsoft Windows	1998	Dinamic Multimedia	Dinamic Multimedia	
PC Fútbol 7	Microsoft Windows	1998	Dinamic Multimedia	Dinamic Multimedia	
Radikal Bikers	Arcade, PlayStation	1998	Gaelco	Gaelco	
Snow Wave: Avalanche	Microsoft Windows	1998	Hammer Technologies	Hammer Technologies	
Turok 2: Seeds of Evil	Game Boy Color	1998	Bit Managers	Acclaim Entertainment	
Commandos: Beyond the Call of Duty	Microsoft Windows	1999	Pyro Studios	Eidos Interactive	
PC Fútbol 2000	Microsoft Windows	1999	Dinamic Multimedia	Dinamic Multimedia	
Toyland Racing	Microsoft Windows	1999	Revistronic	Midas Interactive Entertainment	
Turok: Rage Wars	Game Boy Color	1999	Bit Managers	Acclaim Entertainment	
Beetle Crazy Cup	Microsoft Windows	2000	Xpiral	Infogrames	
Grouch	Microsoft Windows	2000	Revistronic	Big City Games	
K.O. Boxing	Microsoft Windows	2000	Dinamic Multimedia	Dinamic Multimedia	
La Prisión	Microsoft Windows	2000	Dinamic Multimedia	Dinamic Multimedia	
Resurrection: Return of the Black Dragon	Microsoft Windows	2000	Nebula Entertainment	Dinamic Multimedia	
Smashing Drive	Arcade, GameCube, Xbox, Game Boy Advance	2000	Gaelco	Gaelco	
Turok 3: Shadow of Oblivion	Game Boy Color	2000	Bit Managers	Acclaim Entertainment	
Mortadelo y Filemón: Una Aventura de Cine	Microsoft Windows	2000	Alcachofa Soft	Zeta Multimedia	
El Tesoro de Isla Alcachofa	Microsoft Windows	2000	Alcachofa Soft	Alcachofa Soft	
PC Fútbol 2001	Microsoft Windows	2001	Dinamic Multimedia	Dinamic Multimedia	
Commandos 2: Men of Courage	Microsoft Windows, Xbox, Mac OS X	2001	Pyro Studios	Eidos Interactive	
Excalibug	Microsoft Windows	2001	Enigma Software Productions	Dinamic Multimedia	
Severance: Blade of Darkness	Microsoft Windows	2001	Rebel Act Studios	Codemasters	
Torrente: El Juego	Microsoft Windows	2001	Virtual Toys	Electronic Arts	
Runaway: A Road Adventure	Microsoft Windows	2001	Pendulo Studios	Dinamic Multimedia	
Droopy's Tennis Open	Game Boy Advance	2002	Bit Managers, Warthog Games	LSP	
Pro Rally 2002	PlayStation 2, GameCube	2002	UbiSoft Barcelona	UbiSoft	
Commandos 3: Destination Berlin	Microsoft Windows, Mac OS X	2003	Pyro Studios	Eidos Interactive	
The Westerner	Microsoft Windows, Wii, iOS	2003	Revistronic	Planeta DeAgostini	
Praetorians	Microsoft Windows	2003	Pyro Studios	Eidos Interactive	
BreakQuest	Microsoft Windows, Mac OS X, PlayStation Portable	2004	Nurium Games, Beatshapers	Stardock	
High Rollers Casino	PlayStation 2, Xbox	2004	Virtual Toys, Cinemaware	Mud Duck Productions	
Scrapland	Microsoft Windows, Xbox	2004	MercurySteam	Enlight Software	
PC Fútbol 2005	Microsoft Windows	2004	Gaelco	Planeta DeAgostini	
War Times	Microsoft Windows	2004	Legend Studios	Strategy First	
Fallen Lords: Condemnation	Microsoft Windows	2005	Novarama	OnGames	
Imperial Glory	Microsoft Windows, Mac OS X	2005	Pyro Studios	Eidos Interactive	
One	N-Gage	2005	Digital Legends	Nokia	
PC Fútbol 2006	Microsoft Windows	2005	Gaelco	Planeta DeAgostini	
Monster 4x4: World Circuit	Xbox, Wii	2006	Ubisoft Barcelona	Ubisoft	
PC Fútbol 2007	Microsoft Windows	2006	Gaelco	Planeta DeAgostini	
Runaway 2: The Dream of the Turtle	Microsoft Windows, Mac OS X, Nintendo DS, Wii	2006	Pendulo Studios	Focus Home Interactive, FX Interactive	
Commandos: Strike Force	PlayStation 2, Microsoft Windows, Xbox	2006	Pyro Studios	Eidos Interactive	
Clive Barker's Jericho	Microsoft Windows, PlayStation 3, Xbox 360	2007	MercurySteam	Codemasters	
Chronos Twins	Nintendo DS, WiiWare, Nintendo DSi	2007	EnjoyUP Games	Oxygen Games	
Dream Chronicles	Microsoft Windows, Mac OS X, iOS, Xbox Live Arcade, PlayStation Network, Nintendo DS	2007	KatGames	PlayFirst	
Animal Boxing	Nintendo DS	2008	Akaoni Studio	Destineer	
Doodle Hex	Nintendo DS	2008	Tragnarion Studios	Pinnacle Software	
Dream Chronicles 2: The Eternal Maze	Microsoft Windows, Mac OS X, iOS	2008	KatGames	PlayFirst	
Emergency Heroes	Wii	2008	Ubisoft Reflections, Ubisoft Barcelona	Ubisoft	
Fenimore Fillmore's Revenge	Microsoft Windows	2008	Revistronic	Nobilis	
Hero of Sparta	iOS, PlayStation Portable, Nintendo DSi, Android, Symbian^3	2008	Gameloft Iberica	Gameloft	
Little Red Riding Hood's Zombie BBQ	Nintendo DS, Nintendo DSi	2008	EnjoyUp, Gammick Entertainment	Gammick Entertainment, Destineer	
Murder in the Abbey	Microsoft Windows	2008	Alcachofa Soft	The Adventure Company	
Yummy Yummy Cooking Jam	Wii, Nintendo DSi, PlayStation Portable	2008	Virtual Toys	Virtual Toys	
5 Spots Party	WiiWare	2009	Cosmonaut Games	Cosmonaut Games	
Dream Chronicles: The Chosen Child	Microsoft Windows, Mac OS X, iOS	2009	KatGames	PlayFirst	
Elite Forces: Unit 77	Nintendo DS, Nintendo DSi	2009	Abylight	Deep Silver	
Family & Friends Party	Wii	2009	Gammick Entertainment	Gammick Entertainment	
Fish'em All	Wii	2009	Abylight	Abylight	
Fritz Chess	Nintendo DS, PlayStation 3, Wii	2009	Freedom Factory Studios	Deep Silver	
Invizimals	PlayStation Portable	2009	Novarama	Sony Computer Entertainment	
NyxQuest: Kindred Spirits	WiiWare, Windows, Mac OS X, iOS	2009	Over the Top Games	Over the Top Games	
Penguins & Friends: Hey! That's My Fish!	Wii	2009	Gammick Entertainment	Gammick Entertainment	
Runaway: A Twist of Fate	Microsoft Windows, Nintendo DS	2009	Pendulo Studios	Focus Home Interactive, FX Interactive	
Spaceball Revolution	Wii, Nintendo DSi, PlayStation Portable	2009	Virtual Toys	Virtual Toys	
Asphalt 6: Adrenaline	iOS, Mac OS X, Android, Symbian^3, Mobile phone, WebOS, BlackBerry PlayBook, Bada 2.0	2010	Gameloft Barcelona	Gameloft	
Castlevania: Lords of Shadow	PlayStation 3, Xbox 360, Microsoft Windows	2010	MercurySteam, Kojima Productions	Konami	
Dive: The Medes Islands Secret	Wii	2010	Cosmonaut Games, Over the Top Games	Cosmonaut Games	
Dream Chronicles: The Book of Air	Microsoft Windows, Mac OS X, iOS	2010	KatGames	PlayFirst	
Hero of Sparta II	iOS, Bada	2010	Gameloft Iberica	Gameloft	
Invizimals: Shadow Zone	PlayStation Portable	2010	Novarama	Sony Computer Entertainment	
Legends of War	PlayStation Portable, PlayStation 3, Xbox 360, Microsoft Windows, PS Vita	2010	Enigma Software Productions	Enigma Software Productions	
Real Madrid Fantasy Manager	Facebook, iOS, Android	2010	From The Breach	Real Madrid CF	
Robox	Wii	2010	Dreambox Games	Dreambox Games	
Super Hydorah	Microsoft Windows, Xbox One, PlayStation 4, PlayStation Vita	2010	Locomalito	Locomalito	
Zombie Panic in Wonderland	WiiWare, Nintendo 3DS eShop, iOS, Android, Nintendo Switch	2010	Akaoni Studio	Akaoni Studio	
Dream Chronicles: The Book of Water	Microsoft Windows, Mac OS X, iOS	2011	KatGames	PlayFirst	
Invizimals: The Lost Tribes	PlayStation Portable	2011	Novarama	Sony Computer Entertainment	
Little Racers	Xbox 360, OnLive, Microsoft Windows, OS X, Linux	2011	Milkstone Studios	Milkstone Studios	
The Next Big Thing	Microsoft Windows, Macintosh, iOS	2011	Pendulo Studios	Focus Home Interactive, FX Interactive	
Unepic	Linux, OS X, Microsoft Windows, Nintendo Switch, Wii U, PlayStation 4, PlayStation Vita, Xbox One	2011	Francisco Téllez de Meneses	Ninagamers	
Qvoid	iOS, Android	2011	Gavina Games	Gavina Games	
Deadlight	Xbox 360, Microsoft Windows, PlayStation 4, Xbox One	2012	Tequila Works	Microsoft Studios	
Dragon City	Facebook, iOS, Android	2012	Social Point	Social Point	
Reality Fighters	PlayStation Vita	2012	Novarama	Sony Computer Entertainment	
Yesterday	Microsoft Windows, Macintosh, iOS	2012	Pendulo Studios	Focus Home Interactive, FX Interactive	
Nihilumbra	iOS, Microsoft Windows, macOS, Linux, Wii U, PS Vita, Android, Nintendo Switch	2012	BeautiFun Games	BeautiFun Games	
Maldita Castilla	Microsoft Windows, Linux, Ouya, Xbox One, PlayStation 4, Nintendo 3DS, Nintendo Switch	2012	Locomalito	Locomalito	
Zack Zero	PlayStation 3, Microsoft Windows	2012	Crocodile Entertainment	Crocodile Entertainment	
Alien Spidy	Microsoft Windows, Macintosh, Xbox 360, PlayStation 3	2013	Enigma Software Productions	Kalypso Media	
Asphalt 8: Airborne	iOS, Android, Windows Phone 8, BlackBerry 10, Tizen, Microsoft Windows, tvOS	2013	Gameloft Barcelona	Gameloft	
Castlevania: Lords of Shadow – Mirror of Fate	Nintendo 3DS, Xbox 360, PlayStation 3, Microsoft Windows	2013	MercurySteam	Konami	
FX Fútbol	Microsoft Windows	2013	FX Interactive	FX Interactive	
FX Fútbol 2.0	Microsoft Windows	2013	FX Interactive	FX Interactive	
Invizimals: The Alliance	PlayStation Vita	2013	Novarama	Sony Computer Entertainment	
Invizimals: The Lost Kingdom	PlayStation 3	2013	Novarama, Magenta Software	Sony Computer Entertainment Europe	
Scourge: Outbreak	Xbox 360, Microsoft Windows, Macintosh, PlayStation 3	2013	Tragnarion Studios	UFO Interactive Games	
The Last Door	Android, iOS, Windows Phone, Linux, macOS, Microsoft Windows, Nintendo Switch, PlayStation 4	2013	The Game Kitchen	The Game Kitchen	
Tiny Thief	Android, iOS, Microsoft Windows, OS X, Wii U	2013	5Ants	Rovio Entertainment	
Asphalt Overdrive	iOS, Android, Windows Phone, Windows 8.1	2014	Gameloft Madrid	Gameloft	
Full Mojo Rampage	PlayStation 4, Microsoft Windows, Xbox One	2014	Over the Top Games	Over the Top Games	
Gods Will Be Watching	Microsoft Windows, OS X, Linux, iOS, Android	2014	Deconstructeam	Devolver Digital	
Kick-Ass 2: The Game	Microsoft Windows, Mac OS X, Linux, Xbox 360, PlayStation 3	2014	Freedom Factory Studios	UIG Entertainment	
Randal's Monday	Windows, macOS, Android, iOS, PlayStation 4	2014	Nexus Game Studio	Daedalic Entertainment	
The Muppets Movie Adventures	PlayStation Vita	2014	Virtual Toys	Sony Computer Entertainment	
Tiny Troopers: Joint Ops	PlayStation 3, PlayStation 4, PlayStation Vita, Xbox One	2014	Plunge Interactive	Wired Productions	
Castlevania: Lords of Shadow 2	Microsoft Windows, PlayStation 3, Xbox 360	2014	MercurySteam	Konami	
FX Fútbol 2015	Microsoft Windows	2014	FX Interactive	FX Interactive	
Lords of Xulima	Microsoft Windows, OS X, Linux	2014	Numantian Games	Numantian Games	
Mind: Path to Thalamus	Microsoft Windows, macOS, Linux, PlayStation 4	2014	Carlos Coronado	Carlos Coronado	
Ziggurat	Linux, Microsoft Windows, OS X, PlayStation 4, Xbox One, Wii U, Nintendo Switch	2014	Milkstone Studios	Milkstone Studios	
Blues and Bullets	Microsoft Windows, Xbox One, OS X, Linux, PlayStation 4	2015	A Crowd of Monsters	A Crowd of Monsters	
Dead Synchronicity	Android, iOS, Microsoft Windows, OS X, PlayStation 4, Nintendo Switch	2015	Fictiorama Studios	Daedalic Entertainment	
Anima: Gate of Memories	Linux, Macintosh, Nintendo Switch, PlayStation 4, Tomahawk F1, Microsoft Windows, Xbox One	2016	Anima Game Studio	BadLandGames	
Aragami	Linux, Microsoft Windows, OS X, PlayStation 4, Nintendo Switch	2016	Lince Works	Lince Works, Maximum Games	
Candle	Linux, Macintosh, Nintendo Switch, PlayStation 4, Microsoft Windows, Xbox One	2016	Teku Studios	Daedalic Entertainment	
Football Club Simulator	Microsoft Windows	2016	FX Interactive	FX Interactive	
Ghost 1.0	Microsoft Windows, Nintendo Switch, PlayStation 4, Wii U, Xbox One	2016	unepic_fran	unepic_fran	
Heart & Slash	PlayStation 4, Xbox One, Nintendo Switch, Microsoft Windows	2016	aheartfulofgames	BadLandGames	
King Lucas	Microsoft Windows, OS X, Linux	2016	DevilishGames	DevilishGames	
Sandstorm: Pirate Wars	Android, iOS	2016	Ubisoft Barcelona	Ubisoft	
Yesterday Origins	Microsoft Windows, macOS, Nintendo Switch, PlayStation 4, Xbox One	2016	Pendulo Studios	Microids	
Youtubers Life	Microsoft Windows, OS X, Android OS, Linux, iOS, PlayStation 4, Xbox One, Nintendo Switch	2016	U-Play Online	U-Play Online	
The Sexy Brutale	PlayStation 4, Microsoft Windows, Xbox One, Nintendo Switch	2017	Tequila Works, Cavalier Game Studios	Tequila Works	
They Are Billions	Microsoft Windows, PlayStation 4, Xbox One	2017	Numantian Games	Numantian Games	
Rime	Microsoft Windows, Nintendo Switch, PlayStation 4, Xbox One	2017	Tequila Works	Grey Box, Six Foot	
Metroid: Samus Returns	Nintendo 3DS	2017	MercurySteam	Nintendo	
Spacelords	Microsoft Windows, PlayStation 4, Xbox One	2017	MercurySteam	MercurySteam	
Asphalt 9: Legends	iOS, Android, Windows 10, Nintendo Switch	2018	Gameloft Barcelona	Gameloft	
Crossing Souls	Microsoft Windows, macOS, Linux, PlayStation 4, Nintendo Switch	2018	Fourattic	Devolver Digital	
Deiland	PlayStation 4, iOS, Microsoft Windows	2018	Chibig	Chibig	
Flat Heroes	Microsoft Windows, Nintendo Switch	2018	Parallel Circles	Parallel Circles	
Melbits World	PlayStation 4	2018	Melbot Studios	Melbot Studios	
Monster Prom	Microsoft Windows, macOS, Linux	2018	Beautiful Glitch	Those Awesome Guys	
Solo	Microsoft Windows	2018	Team Gotham	Team Gotham	
Do Not Feed the Monkeys	Microsoft Windows	2018	Fictiorama Studios	Alawar Premium	
Gris	Microsoft Windows, Nintendo Switch, iOS, PlayStation 4	2018	Nomada Studio	Devolver Digital	
Moonlighter	macOS, Microsoft Windows, Linux, PlayStation 4, Xbox One, Nintendo Switch	2018	Digital Sun	11 bit studios	
The Red Strings Club	Windows, macOS, Linux, Nintendo Switch	2018	Deconstructeam	Devolver Digital	
Blacksad: Under the Skin	Microsoft Windows, macOS, PlayStation 4, Xbox One, Nintendo Switch	2019	Pendulo Studios	Microids	
Blasphemous	Microsoft Windows, Nintendo Switch, PlayStation 4, Xbox One	2019	The Game Kitchen	Team17	
Etherborn	Nintendo Switch, PlayStation 4, Microsoft Windows, Xbox One	2019	Altered Matter Games	Altered Matter Games	
Killsquad	Microsoft Windows	2019	Novarama	Novarama	
Idle Theme Park Tycoon	Android, iOS	2019	Codigames	Digital Things	
Pet Pals	Android	2019	Fern Bay	Pana studio	
Metroid Dread	Nintendo Switch	2021	MercurySteam	Nintendo	
Crisol: Theater of Idols	Microsoft Windows, PlayStation 5, Xbox One	2026	Vermila Studios	Blumhouse Games	
