= Video games in Spain =

The history of video gaming in Spain dates back to the 1970s, and by 2014 the country was the 10th-highest-grossing market for video games worldwide. In 2018, the Spanish video game market posted a revenue of €1.53 billion, up from €1.35 billion in 2017. The country's audience of game players was 16.8 million that year; demographically, it was 59% male and 41% female. Reportedly 80% of people aged 6-to-10 played video games, while 24% of those in the 45–64 age range did so.

== Early history: 1972–1979 ==
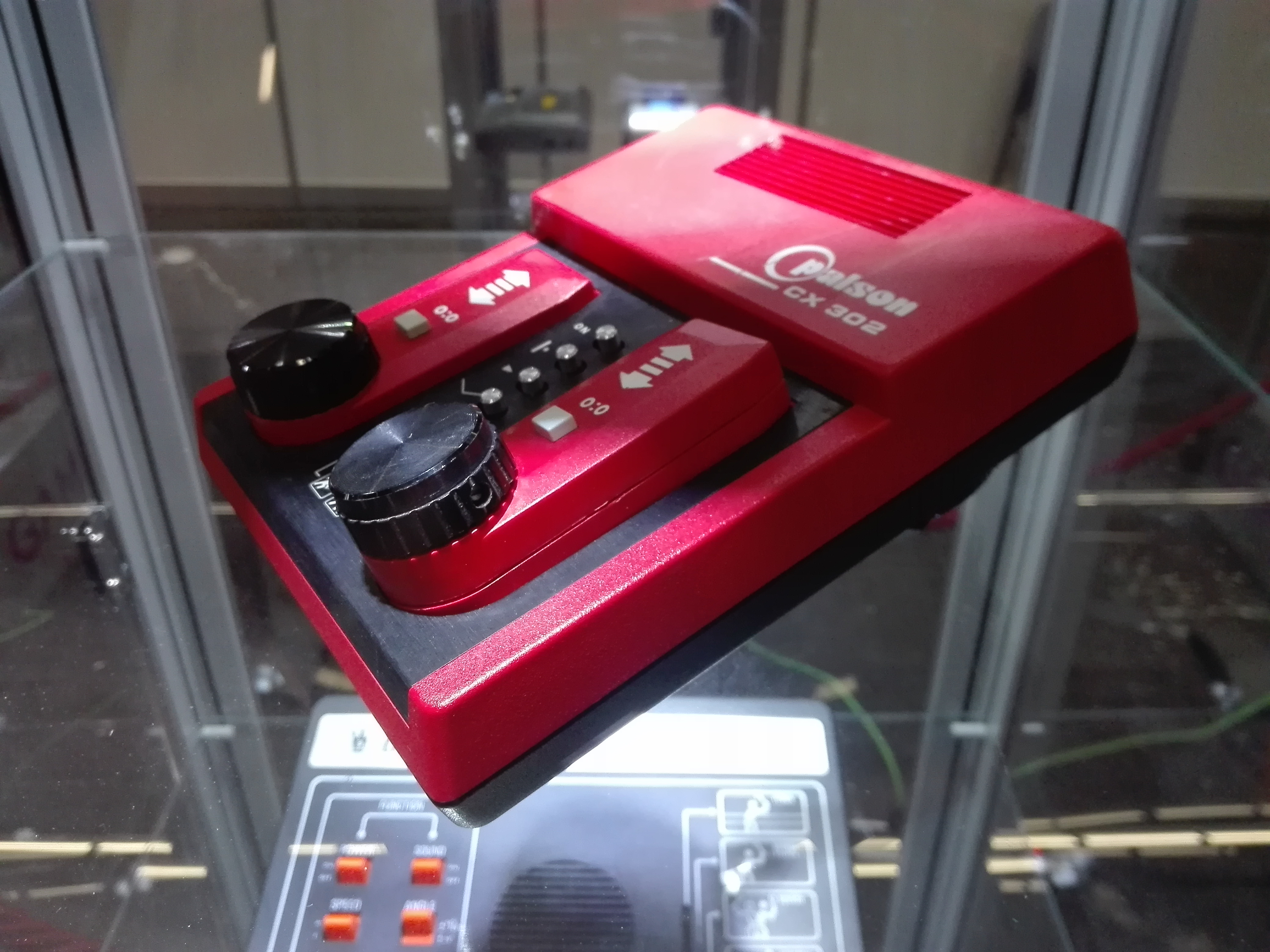
The Palson CX-302, manufactured by Electrónica Ripollé, was an early Spanish video game console packaged with Pong

Researchers Manuel Garin and Víctor Manuel Martínez cite the appearance of Pong in Spain as a key milestone for video games in the country. The game grew popular, and was "blamed ... for a decline in the flourishing—and mostly national—slot machine industry". Spanish firm Electrónica Ripollé released the Palson CX video game console in 1977, which allowed users to play Pong in a home setting. Garin and Martínez compare the console to the Interton Video 2000 from Germany. Video games continued to grow in popularity through the early 1980s, and the Atari 2600 became successful in Spain. By 1981, Spain reportedly accounted for 5,000 jobs in the video game industry.

== First Spanish arcade video games: 1980–1982 ==
The first Spanish-made video games were released by Cidelsa, a company specializing in arcade cabinets. These games were developed by Ferran Yago and his team at EFO SA (Electrónica Funcional Operativa SA) in Barcelona. Notable titles published by Cidelsa include Destroyer (1980), Altair (1981), Altair II (1981), Draco (1981), and Night Mare (Clean Octopus) (1982).

Destroyer (Ferran Yago, 1980) was the first Spanish commercial video game.

Released	Gameplay	Developer	Publisher
1980	"Destroyer". YouTube. 18 July 2014.	Ferran Yago (EFO SA)	Cidelsa
1981	"Altair I / II". YouTube. 2 April 2024.	Ferran Yago (EFO SA)	Cidelsa
1981	"Draco". YouTube. 30 November 2014.	Ferran Yago (EFO SA)	Cidelsa
1982	"Night Mare (Clean Octopus)". YouTube. 22 August 2018.	Ferran Yago (EFO SA)	Playmatic

See more: List of video games developed in Spain

Garin and Martínez argue that "game development arrived a bit late to Spain" compared to countries such as the United States, but that Spanish development was "intense" once it began.

== Golden age of Spanish software: 1983–1992 ==
In Spain, the period between 1983 and 1992 is traditionally designated the "golden age of Spanish software". The first Spanish video game magazine, MicroHobby, began in 1983. That year also saw the release of Bugaboo (also known as La Pulga), often incorrectly cited as the first video game developed in Spain. Designed by Paco Suárez, Bugaboo saw success in the United Kingdom following its initial Spanish launch. Garin and Martínez state, "Spanish artists, programmers, and musicians gradually became interested in game design, and a young and thrilling scene evolved."

A series of domestic companies—such as Topo Soft, Opera Soft, Zigurat and Dinamic Software—soon entered the game industry. An important game released in the period was Dinamic's Yenght (1984) for the ZX Spectrum, credited as the first adventure game developed in Spain. Garin and Martínez cite Army Moves by Dinamic, La Abadía del Crimen by Opera Soft and Las tres luces de Glaurung by Erbe Software as key releases, and note that they "all ... became hits in the 8-bit European market." According to researcher Joaquín Marín Montín, Dinamic's Fernando Martín Basket Master (1987) was another major success, which led the company to develop a series of games based on sports celebrities in Spain. Topo Soft followed with Emilio Butragueño Fútbol in 1988, whose high sales of 100,000 units likewise inspired the company to pursue licensed sports titles.

According to Garin and Martínez, international games were less popular and less respected in Spain than domestic products during the golden age, among both video game players and video game magazines. The researchers write, "Indigenous games were more appreciated and vindicated than foreign imports, as well as cheaper to develop, publish, and buy—a unique, pro-national situation that never again occurred throughout the history of video games in the country."

== Changing landscape: 1990s ==
Spain's game industry of the 1980s collapsed in the early 1990s. Researchers have cited multiple reasons for the crash, including poor marketing and distribution chains, the rising popularity of game consoles over microcomputers and the inability of Spanish teams to adapt to the changing nature of game development itself. Garin and Martínez write, "Many indigenous companies and game studios went into bankruptcy, and while other countries were already adapting to the aesthetic and technological challenges of a new generation of consoles and computers, moving from 8-bit to 16-bit machines, the game industry in Spain seemed to enter a dark age." However, the researchers highlight five Spanish companies as "exceptions" to the industry's malaise in the 1990s: Bit Managers, Dinamic Multimedia, Gaelco, Pendulo Studios and Pyro Studios.

Dinamic's PC Fútbol series, which began in 1992, became one of the most successful Spanish game products during the 1990s. The series launched a new game annually, and made use of sales at newsstands to reach a wider audience. Garin and Martínez characterize the PC Fútbol series as "both a sales hit and a social phenomenon." The 1998 entry, PC Fútbol 7, achieved sales of 400,000 units. Dinamic also branched into basketball with the similar PC Basket franchise.

Garin and Martínez cite Pyro Studios' game Commandos: Behind Enemy Lines (1998) as "[t]he most distinguished Spanish game of the 1990s". The game was an international hit, reaching global sales of 600,000 units after roughly five months. In the German market, it was the fourth-best-selling computer game of 1998. Commandos was also a hit in the United Kingdom, where it spent 15 weeks at #1 on the computer game sales lists. According to publisher Eidos Interactive, the game's global sales surpassed 1.5 million copies by May 2000. In 2001, GameSpot Spain declared Commandos the biggest hit in the history of Spanish games.

Pendulo Studios, founded in 1993, debuted with the graphic adventure game Igor: Objective Uikokahonia in 1994. It has been cited as a landmark Spanish release in the genre. While Spanish developers like Aventuras AD had released interactive fiction games during the 1980s, including those with graphics, a graphic adventure game like Igor had never been made in Spain. The game "encouraged other [domestic] companies to devote themselves" to the genre, according to GameLive PC; and Alejando Alcolea of HobbyConsolas retrospectively highlighted Igor as one of the two most important domestic games, alongside Commandos, to be released in the 1990s. Pendulo continued to develop games in the adventure genre, following Igor in 1997 with Hollywood Monsters, a long-term commercial hit. A writer for MarcaPlayer summarized it in 2011 as "one of the most played and best-selling adventures in Spanish software" history.

In 1996, developer Revistronic released 3 Skulls of the Toltecs, the first Spanish adventure game to see significant success outside its home country. According to GameLive PC, it achieved sales of 25,000 units in Spain and 200,000 across Europe.
