= Carlos Abril =

Spanish video game programmer

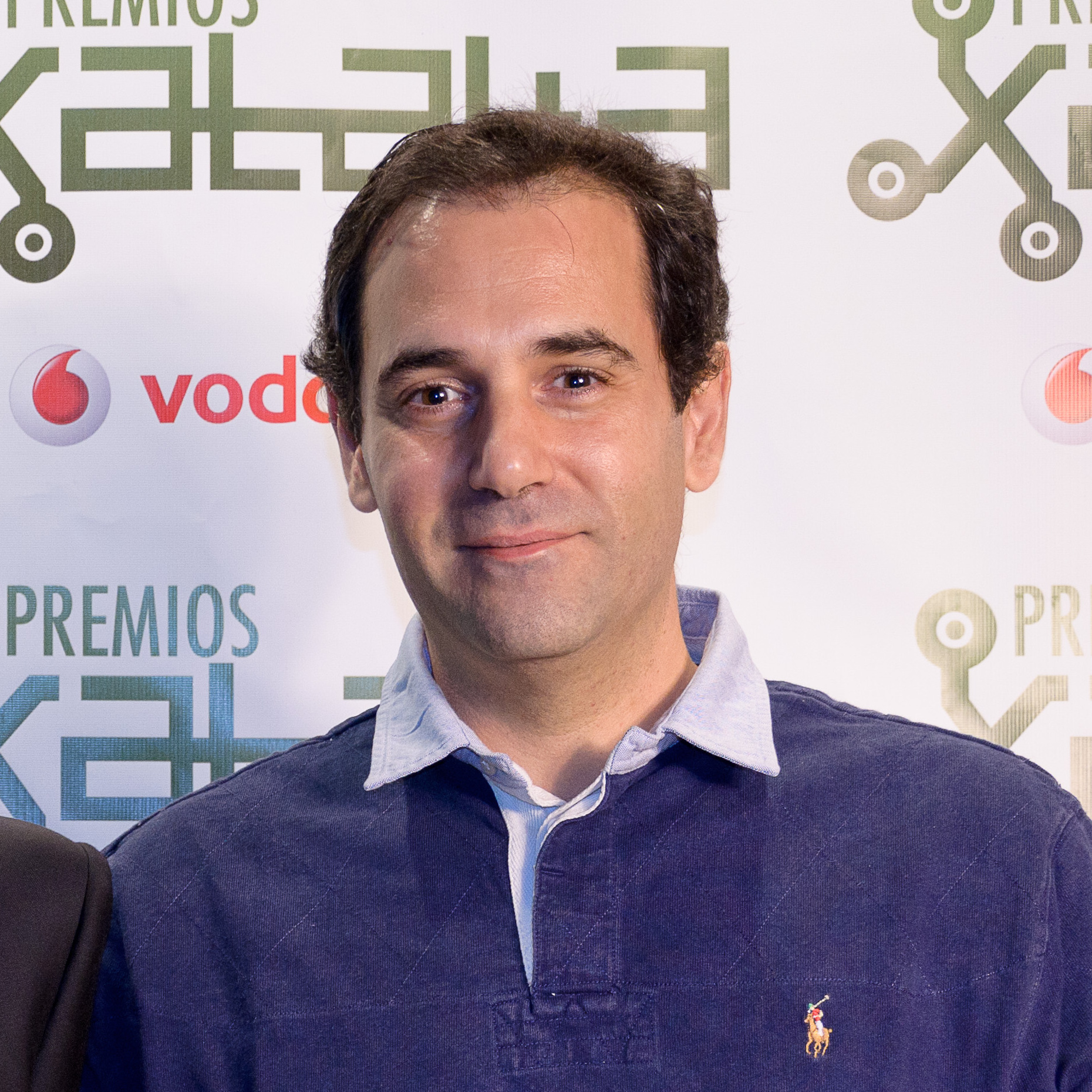
- Carlos Abril at Premios Xataka 2011
- Born: July 2, 1970 (age 56); Madrid, Spain
- Occupation: Video game developer

Carlos Abril (born 2 July 1970) is a Spanish video game programmer, producer and designer best known for his work in the PC Fútbol franchise.

He started working as a programmer for Dinamic Software in Phantis and Navy Moves. Following the company's conversion into Dinamic Multimedia, which he co-founded, he focused in the PC Fútbol franchise and its spin-offs, which was initially developed on a game engine he had developed previously, first as programmer and, from the 1996 PC Fútbol 5.0 edition, as its producer. PC Fútbol 7 was the last edition in which he was involved, as he left the company in 1999.

He subsequently was part in the creation of FX Interactive as its programming director, but his main personal project within the studio, a MOBA titled FX Tanks, failed to be completed. He left FX Interactive to create his own studio, Crocodile Entertainment, which released Zack Zero for PlayStation 3 in 2012, but has since collaborated with FX Interactive to create FX Fútbol, a spiritual successor to PC Fútbol. He has also worked for Saber Interactive and Ubisoft Reflections.
