= Jack Orlando =

1997 video game

- Developer: Toontraxx
- Publishers: TopWare Interactive; JoWooD Productions (Director's cut)
- Composer: Harold Faltermeyer
- Platforms: MS-DOS, Windows
- Release: 1997; Director's cut: RUS: September 1, 2001; NA: October 14, 2001; Steam: January 26, 2012
- Genre: Adventure
- Mode: Single player

Jack Orlando: A Cinematic Adventure is a 1997 point-and-click adventure game by Polish developer Toontraxx and German publisher TopWare Interactive. In 2001, a director's cut version was released, which adds the choice between easy and normal difficulty. The game was re-released in 2009 on GOG.com, and on January 26, 2012, a port of the director's cut was released on Steam.

== Plot ==
The player takes the role of Jack Orlando, a private detective in the post-prohibition 1930s who is framed for murder. Once a respected detective during prohibition for catching bootleggers, he now struggles with crippling alcoholism in the wake of the 21st Amendment. Orlando is given 48 hours to clear his name and find the real killers.

== Reception ==
Reception

Aggregate score
Aggregator	Score
GameRankings	55%

Review scores
Publication	Score
Adventure Gamers	3/5
GameSpot	6.8/10
Just Adventure	C−

The game received mixed reviews from critics. Just Adventure described the game's puzzles, plot, and audio as "a mixed bag", giving the game an overall C− rating. Adventure Gamers rated it 2 out of 5 stars, strongly criticizing the gameplay, puzzles, voice acting and script but stating the "[l]ush artwork, strong score, a simple but solid plot and considerable attention to detail just about save it from total failure." GameSpot noted that the game contains many useless items and conversations that lead nowhere, producing "an interesting change of pace from the standard adventure formula".

== See also ==
- El Tesoro de Isla Alcachofa
- Gilbert Goodmate and the Mushroom of Phungoria
- Hollywood Monsters
- Tony Tough and the Night of Roasted Moths
