= Dragon land =

Dragon land may refer to:

- Dragonland, a Swedish symphonic power metal musical group
- Dragon Tales, a children's cartoon show set in Dragon Land
- Dragon Land, a game developed by Social Point
