= The Grouch =

The Grouch may refer to:

- The Grouch (play) or Dyskolos, a 4th-century B.C. comedy by the Greek dramatist Menander
- The Grouch (rapper) (born 1975), American rapper and producer
- Grouch (video game), a 2000 action-adventure game
- "The Grouch", a song by Green Day from Nimrod
- Oscar the Grouch, a character on Sesame Street
- Brummbär (German for "Grouch"), the Allies' name for the Sturmpanzer 43, a German World War II armoured infantry support gun
