= Gameloft Barcelona =

Spanish video game developer

- Type: Subsidiary
- Industry: Video game industry
- Founded: 2000
- Headquarters: Carrer de Nàpols, 249, Barcelona, Spain
- Products: Asphalt series (2013–present); Despicable Me: Minion Rush; Disney Speedstorm
- Number of employees: 240
- Parent: Gameloft
- Website: https://www.gameloft.com/gameloft-studios/barcelona

Gameloft Barcelona is a Spanish video game development studio founded in 2000 and based in Barcelona. It is one of the main studios of French video game company Gameloft. The studio has developed more than 30 video games to date.

The studio's games include the Asphalt titles Asphalt 8: Airborne and Asphalt Legends, Despicable Me: Minion Rush, Zombie Infection, Hero of Sparta, and Disney Speedstorm. As of 2026, the studio has over 240 employees.

Gameloft Barcelona is located near the Sagrada Familia historical monument.

== History ==
The studio was founded in 2000. It is one of the oldest studios in the Gameloft group, alongside Gameloft Montreal and Gameloft Bucharest, which were also founded in 2000 (excluding Gameloft's headquarters, established in 1999 in Paris).

While Gameloft Barcelona now has more than 240 employees, the studio started with fewer than 50 employees and had 150 in 2016.

Its first stand-alone title was Diamond Rush, released in 2006 on Java ME and BlackBerry. It is cited as one of the most notable mobile titles of the pre-smartphone era. The player controls an explorer whose objective is to collect diamonds across various environments (Southeast Asian temples, European castles, icy caves), avoiding traps and enemies.

In 2007, the studio released its second project, Rise of Lost Empires, in which the player leads a medieval kingdom, manages resources, recruits units, and progresses through a story-driven campaign inspired by PC strategy games. Upon release, the game received favourable reviews, praised for its ambition and production quality on mobile platforms, despite criticism regarding imprecise controls and certain technical limitations.

In 2008, the studio released puzzle game Diamond Twister, which achieved significant success and led to a sequel, Diamond Twister 2. That same year, Gameloft Barcelona completed development of Zombie Infection, which also attracted a substantial player base and later received a sequel, Zombie Infection 2 (developed by Gameloft Shanghai). It was also in 2008 that the studio released Hero of Sparta, of which Gameloft Barcelona would release a sequel, Hero of Sparta 2, in 2010.

In 2011, the studio released Six-Guns, an open-world western action game, which was at the time its most ambitious game. It also released two adaptations of Ubisoft games for mobile phones at the same time: The Adventures of Tintin: The Secret of the Unicorn and James Cameron's Avatar.

In 2013, Gameloft Barcelona released Despicable Me: Minion Rush, launched as a free-to-play title. The game became a commercial success, surpassing one billion downloads. In the same year, the studio also released Asphalt 8: Airborne, part of Gameloft's flagship Asphalt franchise, taking over the franchise from Gameloft Montreal. The game was also a major success, achieving over 500 million sales. It is the most downloaded arcade racing game on mobile platforms and became the highest-rated Spanish-made game of all time on Metacritic, with an average score of 91 out of 100. Asphalt 8 deeply revamped the gameplay of the franchise, notably by adding verticality to the tracks (with jumps).

Between 2015 and 2019, while the Gameloft group experienced significant financial and structural difficulties, the Barcelona studio was not affected by mass layoffs, unlike several other studios within the group. During this period, Gameloft's others Spanish studios, Gameloft Madrid and Gameloft Valence, closed.

In 2018, the studio released Asphalt 9: Legends, which, like previous entries in the series, was commercially successful. The game was ported to Nintendo Switch in 2019 and, following a strategic shift by Gameloft toward computer and console platforms, was later released on computer and Xbox consoles, before arriving on PlayStation 5 in 2024. Asphalt 9: Legends introduces a more advanced nitro system, far more frequent and impactful jumps in the gameplay, as well as 360° spins of the cars to eliminate opponents, while also adding new game modes over the course of updates. To mark the franchise’s 20th anniversary, the game was renamed Asphalt Legends.

In 2023, the studio released Disney Speedstorm, a computer and console racing game inspired by Mario Kart, combining gameplay elements from the Asphalt Gameloft series with Disney and Pixar-themed tracks and characters.

Gameloft Barcelona continues to release updates for Asphalt Legends and Disney Speedstorm in parallel.

In 2026, the studio gradually began recruiting for a "premium game" which will be dedicated to the PC and console platforms (like most new Gameloft games).

== Gameloft Barcelona Games ==
This list may be incomplete, as information on the specific Gameloft studios responsible for individual titles was often limited prior to the 2010s. However, the games listed below were developed primarily or entirely by Gameloft Barcelona.

Title	Year	platform(s)
Diamond Rush	2006	J2ME, BlackBerry
Rise of Lost Empires	2007	IPhone, J2ME, BlackBerry
Midnight Pool 2	2008	Windows Mobile, Android, J2ME, BlackBerry
Diamond Twister	2008	Windows Mobile, IPhone, J2ME, BlackBerry, BREW, DoJa
Zombie Infection	2008	J2ME, BlackBerry, BREW, DoJa, Android
Hero of Sparta	2008	PSP, Nintendo DSi, Symbian, Android, J2ME
Miami Nights 2: The City is Yours	2009	J2ME, BlackBerry, Nintendo DSi
James Cameron's Avatar	2009	IPhone, IPad, Android, Symbian, WebOS
Samurai: Gyangusutā	2009	BREW
Djmix Tour	2009	J2ME, IPhone
Shadow Guardian	2010	IPhone, IPad, Android, Fire OS
Green Farm	2010	IPhone, Android, Browser
Hero of Sparta II	2010	IPhone
Let's Go Bowling	2010	J2ME
My Life in New York	2010	J2ME
The Adventures of Tintin: The Secret of the Unicorn - The Mobile Game	2011	Android, J2ME, BlackBerry
Six-Guns	2011	IPhone, IPad, Fire OS, Android, BlackBerry, Windows phone, Windows App, Blacknut
Asphalt 6 (only for J2ME version)	2011	J2ME
Diamond Twister 2	2011	Android, J2ME
Fantasy Town	2011	IPhone
Shark Dash	2012	IPhone, IPad, Android, BlackBerry, Tizen, Window Phone, Windos App
Midnight Bowling 3	2012	J2ME, Android
Playmobil Pirates	2012	IPhone, IPad, Android
Despicable Me: Minion Rush	2013	Iphone, IPad, Android, Windows
Asphalt 8: Airborne	2013	IPhone, IPad, Android, Windows, Fire OS, Blavkberry, Tizen, TvOS
Spider-Man Unlimited	2014	IPhone, IPad, Windows, BlackBerry
Puzzle Pets: Popping Fun	2014	J2ME
Asphalt: Xtreme (with Gameloft Madrid)	2016	IPhone, Android, Windows
Asphalt 9 : Legends	2018	PlayStation 4, PlayStation 5, Nintendo Switch, Nintendo Switch 2, Xbox One, Xbox Series, Iphone, IPad, Android, Windows
Disney Speedstorm	2023	PlayStation 4, PlayStation 5, Nintendo Switch, Nintendo Switch 2, Xbox One, Xbox Series, IPhone, IPad, Android, Windows
New premium game	TBA	PC and Consoles (no further details available at this time)
