= Resurrection: Return of the Black Dragon =

2000 video game

- Developer: Nébula Entertainment
- Publisher: Dinamic Multimedia
- Designer: Jorge Rosado de Álvaro
- Programmer: Alberto García Baquero
- Composer: Juan Cantón
- Platform: Microsoft Windows
- Release: 2000
- Genres: Action, hack and slash
- Mode: Single-player

Resurrection: Return of the Black Dragon is a 2000 single-player action video game developed by Spanish studio Nébula Entertainment and published by Dinamic Multimedia for Microsoft Windows. Set in a dark fantasy world, the game follows three characters with different fighting styles and abilities. Its campaign combines melee combat, exploration and occasional stealth sequences, while a separate fighting mode allows the player to battle individual enemies in an arena.

== Gameplay ==
The principal game mode, called Adventure, is divided into levels in which the player controls one of three protagonists: Domenico, Daiko or Gau. For most of the campaign, the character used in each level is determined by the story rather than selected freely by the player.

Combat is based on preset combinations of directional and attack inputs. Each protagonist has a different balance of speed, strength and magical ability, as well as a special attack that consumes mana. GameSpot compared the control system to that of Blade of Darkness, while noting that its numerous predefined combinations gave it similarities to a console fighting game.

Domenico uses claw attacks and is capable of moving on all fours and clinging to some ceilings. Ceiling traversal consumes mana but allows him to avoid guards or attack them from above, giving some of his stages a greater emphasis on stealth. Gau is a heavily armoured swordsman whose attacks inflict considerable damage but whose movements are comparatively slow. Daiko is the fastest of the three and fights with two blades; she can also use abilities including fireballs and temporary invisibility.

In addition to the campaign, the game includes a Fighting mode structured as a series of one-on-one arena battles. The player can use the three protagonists against enemies encountered during the Adventure mode. Battles are fought over a maximum of three timed rounds, and additional opponents become available as the player advances through the campaign.

== Plot ==
The demonic god Azogaraz selects his high priest, Ahivoges, to act as the guardian of the Black Dragon. The creature feeds on human souls and transfers their vital energy to Azogaraz, increasing the god's power. Ahivoges is therefore charged with supplying the dragon with enough souls for Azogaraz to extend his influence over the mortal world.

Before the plan can be completed, paladins from Siul intervene and interrupt the ritual. They drive the Black Dragon away and release the souls it has already consumed. Ahivoges and the dragon subsequently flee to the kingdom of Sagras, where they are received by its king, who is unaware of their true intentions. Prince Bertrand, the king's son-in-law, recognises the danger presented by the visitors. To prevent Bertrand from exposing the plan, Ahivoges moves against him while attempting to bring the kingdom under his control.

The growing threat draws three heroes into the conflict. Domenico is a half-demonic fighter motivated by revenge and possessing abilities inherited from his demonic ancestors. Gau is a heavily armoured knight searching for the truth, while Daiko is a priestess undertaking a mysterious mission and trained in magical and mental powers. Their separate journeys eventually become connected through the schemes of Ahivoges and Azogaraz.

During the campaign, the three protagonists travel through locations affected by Ahivoges's activities. Domenico infiltrates a guarded palace, using his claws and supernatural abilities to move across ceilings and avoid detection. Gau searches for a sacred sword held by a blacksmith, while Daiko passes through a plague-stricken settlement inhabited by zombies. Their paths eventually lead them to a slave fortress, where Domenico and Daiko attempt to rescue Gau.

The three heroes must ultimately combine their different abilities to prevent Ahivoges from consolidating his control over Sagras and stop Azogaraz and the Black Dragon from consuming further souls. Their objective is to defeat the demonic forces before the Black Dragon can acquire enough power to complete Azogaraz's plan.

== Development and release ==
Resurrection was developed by the Spanish studio Nébula Entertainment and published in Europe by Dinamic Multimedia. The game's original design was credited to Jorge Rosado de Álvaro, with Alberto García Baquero serving as lead programmer and Juan Cantón composing the music and creating the sound effects.

A preview build examined by GameSpot was described as having an unusually high level of difficulty. The publication reported that Nébula was aware of some of the difficulty concerns and had added selectable difficulty settings to a demonstration version. At that time, the game was available in Europe but the developer had not secured a publisher for the United States.

== Reception ==
Critical response was mixed to negative. GameSpot found that the three protagonists and their substantially different abilities added strategy and variety to the otherwise familiar hack-and-slash formula. The publication particularly praised the change of pace provided by Domenico's stealth-oriented opening mission and the variety of settings, which included a palace, a mechanical fortress and a plague-stricken town.

GameSpot nevertheless criticised the aggressive enemy artificial intelligence, frequent group attacks, unresponsive controls and the difficulty of executing special moves. The preview also considered the visuals inconsistent, observing that some environments were effective but that low-resolution textures, dated character models and reused architecture made certain areas difficult to navigate.

Piotr Hajek of GRYOnline rated the game 5.5 out of 10. He praised the distinct abilities of the three protagonists, the construction of some levels and the Fighting mode, which he considered more immediately engaging than parts of the campaign. However, he criticised the movement system, the inability to interrupt attack animations, dated graphics, low-detail character models and performance problems at a resolution of 800×600. He ultimately regarded Resurrection as inferior to both Blade of Darkness and Rune.

Bonusweb similarly compared the game unfavourably with Rune, regarding it as an unsuccessful attempt to create a more varied version of that game.
