= UnMetal =

2021 action-adventure stealth comedy video game

- Developer: Francisco Téllez de Meneses
- Publishers: Versus Evil; Eastasiasoft (PS Vita)
- Platforms: PlayStation Vita, Windows, PlayStation 4, Xbox One, Nintendo Switch
- Release: PlayStation Vita; 21 April 2021; Windows, PlayStation 4, Xbox One, Nintendo Switch; 28 September 2021
- Genres: Action-adventure, stealth, comedy
- Mode: Single-player

UnMetal is a 2021 action-adventure stealth video game developed by Francisco Téllez de Meneses and published by Eastasiasoft for the PlayStation Vita and Versus Evil for Windows, PlayStation 4, Xbox One, and Nintendo Switch. The game follows Jesse Fox, a falsely-accused prisoner who attempts to escape a military prison while uncovering a nuclear threat.

The game is an absurdist parody of Konami's Metal Gear franchise, using fourth wall metahumor, running gags, and action film tropes throughout its presentation and gameplay; the game's protagonist, Jesse Fox, is a direct parody of recurring Metal Gear protagonists Solid Snake and Naked Snake. Gameplay is similar to Metal Gear (1987) and Metal Gear 2: Solid Snake (1990) with modern overhauls, including a crafting system, a reliance on non-lethal weaponry, and direct influence of the narration and player's choices in certain sections.

UnMetal was released on 21 April 2021 for the PlayStation Vita, and 28 September 2021 for PC and consoles, to generally positive reviews.

== Gameplay ==
An in-game screenshot of Fox hiding from two guards blocking the path to a door

In UnMetal, the player controls Jesse Fox, a prisoner attempting to escape a maximum-security prison. While moving through each level, Fox must avoid visual contact and direct confrontation with patrolling guards; if he is detected, the alarm will be sounded, and Fox must hide from reinforcements until they lose track of where he is. To dispatch guards, Fox can hit them at close-range, or he can distract them by hitting objects or tossing a coin to sneak past or lure them. Unconscious enemies can be carried to hide their bodies, or they can be searched for items. Different weapons are unlocked as the game progresses, including a slingshot firing "depleted uranium balls", chloroform, a pistol, a flamethrower, Molotov cocktails, grenades, electromagnetic grenades, and a rocket launcher; ranged weapons require limited ammunition that must be collected and stockpiled. If Fox is injured, he will begin to bleed and slowly lose health; players can use bandages to stop the bleeding, medkits to gradually replenish health, or blood bags to fully replenish health. As Fox refuses to kill people, any enemies incapacitated by lethal weapons such as the pistol must be healed using an available medkit before they bleed out, or the player will get a game over, though this is unnecessary for bosses and non-human enemies.

Gameplay is presented in 2D from a top-down perspective, controlling Fox as he moves through each level's screens. The game has ten levels, with additional achievements and secrets to unlock. Some level segments feature unique gameplay, such as a shoot 'em up-esque boat battle with an attack helicopter or a submersible section reminiscent of Metal Slug 3. A menu bar on the right side of the screen displays Fox's experience level, health, and currently-equipped item and weapon. Fox can carry various items in his inventory, and can combine specific items together to craft equipment to progress through certain sections, such as combining plastic barrels and a wooden pallet to create a raft used as a bridge. Fox can also communicate with three colleagues via radio to gain information or tips on what to do next. After leveling up through experience points, the player can choose between different perks and upgrades, such as health regeneration or faster action completion. To save the game, Fox must use the urinal in washrooms located throughout levels or a potty item to save at any time, though potties are "filled" upon use and cannot be used again until the player uses a urinal.

The game's story is told primarily by Fox as a story within a story, presented through cutscenes and brief pauses for narration. At several points in the game, the player can choose between different options of telling the story, which can influence gameplay and game difficulty, but Fox's unreliable narration and his tendency to leave out key details and embellish things mean the options are often vague and are not what they seem. For instance, in one section Fox describes encountering a tentacled creature, with options for "two", "four", or "six"; selecting "six" gives the creature six tentacles, but selecting "two" gives the creature "two dozen tentacles", making the resulting boss fight harder.

== Plot ==
Some time after the dissolution of the Soviet Union, (Note: Though Fox claims in the intro cutscene that he was captured in 1972, this is merely a reference to The A-Team, and the Soviet Union is mentioned to have already collapsed.) a Soviet military helicopter treads into U.S.-allied airspace and is shot down. The pilot, Jesse Fox, is apprehended and transferred to the U.S. Army's custody for interrogation by an unnamed lieutenant. The game's frame story follows Fox as he explains his turn of events to the lieutenant, which is in turn recounted by Fox to his unnamed girlfriend on a drive through a savanna.

Fox was falsely imprisoned by the X Army, a mercenary unit led by General X, and held in a prison on their base. After breaking out of his cell, Fox meets fellow prisoners Colonel Alan Harris, a U.S. Army colonel believed dead in an ambush, and Robert, a journalist arrested for photographing a shipment of concrete. Fox escapes the prison through the sewers, but unintentionally surfaces in the base's Alpha Building. While searching for a way out, Fox learns of "Operation Jerico", a large-scale attack plan by the X Army, and meets and falls in love with the Doctor, the sole physician of the base's sick bay, who rejects his advances but agrees not to turn him in. After rescuing the Doctor from being arrested for treason, Fox escapes into the jungle outside and tries to hide in the back of an outbound truck, but the truck returns to the base's boot camp, forcing Fox to sneak through the camp to board another truck.

The truck arrives at a port owned by the X Army, where Fox learns Operation Jerico is a nuclear terrorist plot involving stolen Soviet nuclear weapons launched from ballistic missile submarines; the concrete Robert photographed was a containment sarcophagus used to store the warheads. However, Fox's activities attract the attention of General X, who takes the Colonel from his cell. After sinking one of the submarines, Fox flees in a boat, but it runs out of fuel outside the Omega Building, the X Army's headquarters. Fox sneaks in to steal a helicopter and meets Dr. Hoffman, a nuclear chemist and the Doctor's father who was forced to create uranium-235 for the X Army; while Fox tries to comprehend how they are related, the Doctor is kidnapped by General X. Fox reaches the roof of the Omega Building and secures a helicopter, but while searching for its keys in the basement he encounters a hologram of General X, who orders him to surrender or the Colonel and the Doctor will die; Fox uses C-4 to rescue the pair, but the Colonel is knocked out, while the Doctor admits she was used to lure Fox and that she must stay or her father will be killed. Fox carries the Colonel to the roof and fights General X, who stuns Fox and almost executes him before the Colonel regains consciousness, shoots General X, and carries Fox to the helicopter.

During the game's final act, a burnt corpse is discovered in the crashed helicopter, and Fox is accused of murdering the Colonel. However, the corpse is identified as General X's, while the Colonel arrives alive and well, having been forcibly parachuted out of the helicopter by Fox so he would not be harmed in the shoot-down. Fox is cleared of wrongdoing and awarded for his actions. In the aftermath, Operation Jerico is foiled, the X Army is arrested, Robert receives a Pulitzer Prize, the Doctor and Dr. Hoffman work on a cancer cure using "nano-nuclear weapons", and Fox returns to his life as a smuggler; the drive he is on with his girlfriend is revealed to be one such smuggling operation. The pair approach a security checkpoint, but the soldier checking their passports recognizes Fox and lets them pass, impressing his previously skeptical girlfriend enough for her to kiss him.

In a post-credits scene, the soldier from the checkpoint reveals to a colleague that Fox simply bribed him to "recognize" his heroics, and that the entire story was made up "just to score".

== Development ==
UnMetal was developed by Spanish game developer Francisco Téllez de Meneses, a former Ubisoft developer, under the pseudonym "Unepic Fran" and the indie studio UnEpic Games. Several elements of the game, including some levels and mechanics, are directly copied and improved from Prisoner of War (2017), a similar MSX video game developed by Francisco. The game's player character, Jesse Fox, was originally created in 2018 for Afraid Project, a strategy game that donated money to African humanitarian aid NGOs based on the player's progress, in which Fox was an aid delivery driver; however, Afraid Project was canceled when its Kickstarter campaign failed.

UnMetal was first released for the PlayStation Vita on 21 April 2021 with a limited run of physical copies published by Eastasiasoft. Experience from the PS Vita release was used to improve aspects of the game ahead of its digital ports, such as the graphics of certain levels. The game was among the indie titles that were teased in the Guerrilla Collective showcase at E3 2021, the final Electronic Entertainment Expo before the event's retirement in 2023. UnMetal was released on Steam, the PlayStation Store, the Xbox Games Store, and the Nintendo eShop on 28 September 2021.

== Reception ==
UnMetal received mostly positive reviews upon release. Review aggregator Metacritic displays a score of 85 out of 100 based on 7 critic reviews, and a user score of 8.3 based on 36 user ratings.

In a review for PC Gamer, Joseph Knoop praised the game's humor, the influence of the unreliable narration, and how it captured "Hideo Kojima's flair for bonkers storytelling, villainous monologuing, and action hero logic". Francis DiPersio of Hey Poor Player similarly lauded the humor and influence of the narration on gameplay, saying "there were moments that literally left me in tears and gasping for breath as if I were infected with FOXDIE", though he also criticized the "obnoxious" difficulty of two maze segments that must be completed without errors. Daniel Weissenberger of Gamecritics.com called UnMetal "one of the most successful comedy games of all time" and commended how well it parodied Metal Gear and Kojima's "ultra-serious" storytelling. Ryan Keenum, writing for Screen Rant, highlighted how the comedic elements helped the game stand out and remain original even as a clear Metal Gear parody, which he attributed to "clever, enjoyable writing". In Third Coast Review, Antal Bokor called the game "absurd in the most delightful ways" and deemed it one of his favorite games of 2021.

Reviewing the Switch version for Nintendo Life, Stuart Gipp was more critical, describing the game as "almost feel[ing] like a minigame collection" owing to its "fragmented" gameplay style and adding that he "didn't laugh or even really smirk" at the game's humor, though he did enjoy the gameplay and called UnMetal "a game that could never be accused of lacking in ideas across its 10ish-hour runtime". A.J. Maciejewski of Video Chums found the game funny and highlighted the viability of non-lethal weapons, but criticized the trial and error nature of certain segments and boss battles that force the player to lose repeatedly to learn how to proceed. Arana Judith of WellPlayed liked the game's concept of lampooning Kojima's works and complimented the strength of the gameplay, but she disliked how the player is forced to heal enemies they shoot, calling it "tedious" especially after the alarm is triggered, and described the cover system as being poorly-conveyed and too limited to effectively hide with.

== See also ==
- Unepic
- Ghost 1.0
