= Mortadelo y Filemón: El Sulfato Atómico =

1998 video game

- Spanish cover art
- Developer: Alcachofa Soft
- Publisher: Zeta Multimedia
- Platform: Windows
- Release: November 1998
- Genre: Graphic adventure
- Mode: Single-player

Mortadelo y Filemón: El Sulfato Atómico (transl. Mortadelo and Filemon: The Atomic Sulfate) is a 1998 graphic adventure game developed by the Spanish company Alcachofa Soft and published by Zeta Multimedia.

== Gameplay and plot ==
An adaptation of the Spanish comic series Mort & Phil by Francisco Ibáñez, specifically the 1969 first long story El sulfato atómico, it follows the secret agents Mort and Phil as they attempt to steal a chemical weapon from the villainous Republic of Tirania. The player controls the two agents separately to solve puzzles, in a manner that has been compared to the gameplay of Maniac Mansion.

== Development ==
El Sulfato Atómico was the first original, non-educational game bankrolled by Zeta, and was created with input from Ibáñez. Alcachofa head Emilio de Paz noted that the author provided model sheets for the cast, sketches for the backgrounds and other assistance. According to de Paz, Alcachofa chose to adapt Ibáñez's first story because it was longer-form than most Mort & Phil comics, although the team borrowed "gags and other elements from many other" installments in the series. He noted that the game's budget was "very, very limited".

== Reception ==
El Sulfato Atómico was commercially successful. With sales above 70,000 units, the game "multiplied by 50 the money [Zeta Multimedia] invested in the development", according to El País. Carlos Burgos of PC Manía praised El Sulfato Atómico, writing that it will delight young and old. MeriStation's Jordi Espunya was less positive, criticizing the game's length, simplicity and audiovisual fidelity.In 2026 the game was rerealseed

== Legacy ==
El Sulfato Atómico was the first installment in a series of adventure games based on Mort & Phil. While the comics had previously inspired arcade-style games during the golden age of Spanish software, such as Mortadelo y Filemón II: Safari Callejero, Alcachofa Soft's project marked the beginning of a new strain of adaptations. Zeta Multimedia proceeded to publish a follow-up to El Sulfato Atómico in 1999: Mortadelo y Filemón: La Máquina Meteoroloca, developed by Vega Creaciones Multimedia rather than Alcachofa. Based on the Mort & Phil comic El Estropicio Meteorológico, the game was again created with assistance from Francisco Ibáñez. According to the magazine Dealer World España, Zeta pushed La Máquina Meteoroloca as one of its "star products" during the Christmas 1999 shopping season. The game drew a positive review from PC Manía, whose Carlos Burgos deemed it "excellent" and more faithful than El Sulfato Atómico to Ibáñez's series, while Spain's PC Actual declared Vega's game "a bit monotonous".

Vega was shuttered in the first half of 2000, and Alcachofa returned to creating Mort & Phil adventure games after La Máquina Meteoroloca's release. The developer handled the remainder of the series, which became its best-known body of work before the launch of Murder in the Abbey (2008). Micromanía reported that the Mort & Phil games helped to put Alcachofa on the map. Summarizing the company's history in 2008, Julio Gómez of Vandal wrote that Alcachofa ultimately saw "its fortunes joined to" El Sulfato Atómico. Alcachofa's second Mort & Phil title, Mortadelo y Filemón: Una Aventura de Cine, debuted in 2000. It launched as two games—respectively subtitled Dos Vaqueros Chapuceros and Terror, Espanto y Pavor—sold separately for 3,995 pesetas each. Combining the two opens access to a third episode, Parque Jurásico, to complete the full Una Aventura de Cine product. The combined game also features local and online cooperative multiplayer support for two players.

Alcachofa followed Una Aventura de Cine in 2001 with Mortadelo y Filemón: La Sexta Secta. It was again composed of two individual games, entitled El Escarabajo de Cleopatra and Operación Moscú, that combine to form the complete product. The final entry in the Mort & Phil adventure game series arrived with La Banda de Corvino, launched in 2003. Like its predecessors, it retailed as two complementary episodes, this time under the names Mamelucos a la Romana and Balones y Patadones.

In 2019, Erbe Software re-released the game on Steam, alongside several other Mort & Phil titles by Alcachofa.

In 2026, RatalaikaGames re-released the game in modern consoles; the English translation uses the first German names instead of the familiar Mort & Phil.

== See also ==
- 3 Skulls of the Toltecs
- Hollywood Monsters
