= PC Fútbol 5.0 =

1997 video game

- Cover art, featuring Michael Robinson
- Developer(s): Dinamic Multimedia
- Producer(s): Carlos Abril
- Designer(s): Alberto Moreno
- Programmer(s): Pablo Ariza
- Artist(s): Dimas Gorostarzu
- Composer(s): José Antonio Martín
- Series: PC Fútbol
- Platform(s): Windows; MS-DOS
- Release: January 4, 1997
- Genre(s): Sports manager
- Mode(s): Single-player, multiplayer

PC Fútbol 5.0 is a PC sports manager video game and football-themed software developed by Dinamic Multimedia and released in Spain in January 1997. It was the fifth entry in the PC Fútbol series, covering the 1996-97 football season, and the first edition that was developed for Windows 95 (though an MS-DOS version was also released, the last one in the franchise) and to include Internet features. Apart from the game proper, the software included additional features such an electronic database with information on all three tiers' players, a table calculator (Seguimiento manual), a football lottery assistant (Proquinielas) and an online football newsletter (Infofútbol). A printed 1995–96 annual was also included along with the CD.

== Gameplay ==
The software was divided into eleven sections, listed as follows:

- Instrucciones (Instructions)
- Historia (History)
- Base de datos (Database)
- Seguimiento (Monitoring)
- Seguimiento manual (Manual monitoring)
- Actualización online (Online update)
- Infofútbol
- Partido amistoso (Friendly match)
- Liga manager
- Liga promanager
- Proquinielas

=== Teams ===
The game featured all teams in La Liga, Segunda División and, for the first time, Segunda División B for a total of 122 teams available in the Manager and Promanager league modes. Additionally it included all teams that participated in the UEFA Champions League, the Cup Winners' Cup and the UEFA Cup except for those ousted in the two latters' qualifying rounds and a selection of South American teams were available as playable teams in the friendly games mode.

=== Manager and Promanager modes ===
The Manager mode allowed the player to play with a single Primera, Segunda or Segunda B team, while Promanager was a password-protected career mode that had him choose initially from a number of lower-ranked Segunda División B teams, with increasingly higher-ranked teams made available as seasons passed if the established objectives were met. Both modes offer four different approaches to the gameplay, having the player act as either the club's coach (Entrenador), manager (Manager), chairman (President) or all three. The matches can be either played (Arcade), watched (Visionado) or have its result and statistics displayed in half-time and full-time score boards (Resultado). For the first time, a mobile-camera 3D engine was developed for the two former modes, even though the players still were 2D models. Either a keyboard or a joystick could be used, allowing for local multiplayer, and up to 20 teams could be used in each save slot.

=== Narration ===
Michael Robinson and Chus del Río were in charge of the narration.

== Release ==
PC Fútbol 5.0 was scheduled to be released in October 1996, like previous PC Fútbol editions, but the ambitious scope of the software proved too taxing for the seven-member programming team and the production was eventually delayed to December. However, part of the software was turned into Gremlin Interactive's Premier Manager 97 and released in November in the United Kingdom. The full software still couldn't be finished in time for its intended Spanish release, and its production was eventually completed in December for a January 1997 release, just in time for the Reyes Magos celebration. The game was a major commercial success for Dinamic and sold 305.000 copies in Spain.

== Trivia ==
Raúl Martínez, who played in Segunda B for Valencia's farm team, had a far higher ingame basic rating (72) than the other players in the category and could be sold for any release clausule regardless how high, which made him very popular among the game's players. Martínez claims that when the following season he signed for Yeclano its coach admitted that he had attracted his attention through his rating in the game.
