= Animal Boxing =

2008 video game

- Developer: Akaoni Studio
- Publishers: Destineer, Gammick Entertainment
- Director: Jose M. Iñiguez
- Producer: Jose M. Iñiguez
- Designer: Jose M. Iñiguez
- Programmer: Carlos Campaña
- Artists: Alex Fernández Pons, David Fernández Huerta, Ikari Studio
- Platforms: Nintendo DS, DSiWare
- Release: Nintendo DS: NA: October 28, 2008 DSiWare; NA: January 17, 2011; EU: February 4, 2011
- Genres: Sports, fighting
- Modes: Single-player, Multiplayer

Animal Boxing is a sports video game developed by Spanish studio Akaoni Studio for the Nintendo DS.

== Gameplay ==
The game involves boxing with over 50 various animals by using the touchscreen; the game is played with the DS held upside down so that the touch screen is above, which is then used to throw punches while the face buttons or d-pad, depending on the player's dominant hand, is used for defense. In single player mode, players control a customizable human, while in multiplayer mode, which can be played wirelessly against another player with a copy of the game, they can control a human or an animal.

Matches in Animal Boxing are played under a special set of rules that make the game feel more like an arcade fighting game rather than a boxing simulator, in that there is no knockdown; the contestant who loses all health first loses the match outright in a technical knockout, although brief breaks are given to both fighters every time either of their health drops below one of two thresholds; if no TKO occurs within three rounds of play, the healthier fighter wins on a technicality. Taking and throwing punches also builds up a rage meter that temporarily boosts a fighter's damage output once it is completely filled. The player can also grab pickups that grant health or rage boosts, with the latter being more common. There are 24 belts to win in the single-player campaign mode, and a player must defeat a series of opponents in a single sitting to win a belt, with unlimited tries permitted against each opponent en route to the belt. The original physical release also supports Rumble Pak for force feedback.

== Plot ==
The player character takes control of a human being who joins a community of animals in the Forest of Happiness. After they spent many months trying to fit in, a boxing gym opens, and all of the Forest's residents, along with their new human guest, begin training for the sport in a scramble for pugilistic supremacy. Working from the bottom, the player character challenges and defeats many animals to earn twenty-four belts, eight in each of three classes, to become the best boxer among them all. Amazed at their strength, the animals finally regard them as a friend.

== Development and release ==
Lead designer Jose M. Iñiguez, who avidly enjoyed boxing along with other martial arts, conceived Animal Boxing as a mix between thrilling martial arts sports action and comical cartoon characters. His development team was put under tight time and technical constraints in developing the game. They only had three-quarters of a year to complete it, which did not permit them to add significant enhancements to the gameplay experience, such as a combo system and more fleshed-out personalities for the various animal opponents. Memory constraints also made some of them difficult to design, such as an early model of a crocodile opponent taking up too much memory to the point where it crashed the DS.

Destineer published a physical release of the game in 2008 exclusively in North America and Gammick Entertainment released a digital version of the game on DSiWare in 2011 in North America and Europe.

== Reception ==
Upon release, Animal Boxing received scant reviews, with none of them being positive. Only two major reviews were submitted for each format. The physical release received a mediocre, lukewarm review from IGN, who praised the graphics and controls, while criticizing the gameplay, namely the lack of significant opponent diversity. IGN scored the physical release a 5.6 out of 10.

The digital release on DSiWare received more negative reviews, with Nintendo Life and Games Master UK directing criticism towards the game's AI. The former also contended that its overall quality was not on par with its sold price of 800 points. Both reviewers gave this format a score of 40%.

Carlos Campaña, the game's lead programmer, admitted that the game's rushed development indeed hampered the game's quality and made the fighting too repetitive.
