= Six-Guns =

2011 video game

- Developer: Gameloft Barcelona
- Publisher: Gameloft
- Producers: Jonathan Stock; Jean-Claude Labelle
- Designer: Diego Barragan
- Programmer: David Flix
- Artists: Arthur Hugot; Christophe Latour; Toni Rodriguez
- Platforms: Android; Windows; Windows Phone iOS
- Release: iOS; December 5, 2011; Android; March 17, 2012; Windows/Windows Phone; September 4, 2013
- Genre: Action-adventure
- Modes: Single-player multiplayer

Six-Guns is an open-world action-adventure video game developed by Gameloft Barcelona and published by Gameloft. It was released in 2011 for iOS devices, on March 17, 2012, for Android devices, and on September 4, 2013, for Microsoft Windows and Windows Phone.

== Gameplay ==
Six-Guns is a wild-west styled open-world, action adventure third-person mobile game. The player may roam about on foot or by horse to complete missions as a man named Buck Crosshaw across two game maps, Arizona (with deserts and mesas) and Oregon (featuring forests and mountains). An in-game store and currency system allow for upgradable clothing items, weapons, and horses, with optional microtransactions available for additional or premium credits. As missions are completed, the player is rewarded with coins and experience points, unlocking access to higher tier items from the store. The main storyline and campaign follows Crosshaw's discoveries of the happenings and fate of his lost wife, while a multiplayer mode features online team deathmatches and capture-the-flag.

The Windows 8 version had support for touch controls, keyboard and mouse, and a gaming controller. The game could also cloud save to a linked account, such as Game Center on iOS or Xbox Live on Windows.

== Plot ==
Buck Crosshaw, a lone, and amnesiac outlaw, awakens in the Arizona desert and heads west in search for the nearest settlement. Approaching a ranch, he witnesses a group of bandits raiding the property. Buck fends off the bandits and is compensated with an Azteca. As he rides away, Buck's memory is suddenly triggered and he recalls his wife being mysteriously killed. Unsettled, Buck heads to the town of Socorro to drink and repress any memories of his wife.

Upon arrival to Socorro, the sheriff recognizes Buck as an outlaw and holds him at gunpoint, accusing him of murder which further stimulates Buck's memory. A band of raiders suddenly arrive to pillage the town, and Buck helps the sheriff to defend the town, for which the Sheriff releases him. Buck decides to visit his wife's grave to recall his memory. At the graveyard, Buck witnesses a group of grave robbers digging up and stealing his wife's corpse, prompting Buck to investigate into her death. He follows the robbers discovers them to be part of a larger gang of ruthless outlaws and criminals. After killing several gang leaders and encountering nightcrawlers, witches, and werewolves, a mysterious monster hunter known as the Exorcist confronts Buck and reveals the true nature of the gang.

The Exorcist explains that the outlaw gang is a secretive cult fixated on performing a ritual to summon demonic and supernatural entities into the world, including the devil himself. In addition, Buck's wife was also a powerful witch in the cult, and Buck shot and seemingly murdered her after realizing her evil intentions. The Exorcist reveals that his wife survived, and that he needs Buck's help in preventing her from conducting the ritual.

Initially discouraged, Buck starts drinking but later but overhears and follows some gang cultists to an abandoned mining town. After defeating the outlaws, Buck enters the mine and confronts his wife. She reveals that Buck never reciprocated her love for him, and that she had to create love elixirs with “dark magic” for his affection, where her obsession with witchcraft first developed. The Exorcist suddenly arrives and impales the witch before she fatally wounds him. Buck fights the witch and overcomes her, but then succumbs to a wound from her ritual knife.

Buck awakens in a mystic, supernatural dimension facing the devil as a shadowed incarnation of Buck himself. The devil reveals that he possessed Buck’s body to kill his wife to instigate the events leading to the ritual. With the aid of the Exorcist’s spirit, Buck fights and defeats the devil. Buck emerges from the mine and buries the Exorcist’s body, vowing to rid the land of the remaining demonic entities.

== Reception ==
Six-Guns received mixed reviews, scoring a 59 on Metacritic. Many critics praised the graphics and audio of the game, but criticized the repetitive and simple gameplay.

Some also felt that the controls were poor on touchscreen devices.
