= Ghost 1.0 =

2016 video game

- Cover art of the game
- Developer: unepic_fran
- Publisher: unepic_fran
- Platforms: Microsoft Windows; Xbox One; Nintendo Switch; PlayStation 4
- Release: Microsoft Windows; June 7, 2016; Xbox One; July 11, 2018; Nintendo Switch; July 12, 2018; PlayStation 4 April 8, 2019
- Genre: Metroidvania
- Mode: Single-player

Ghost 1.0 is a Metroidvania video game developed and published by Francisco Téllez de Meneses and an unnamed development team for Windows, Xbox One, Nintendo Switch, and PlayStation 4. Set in a high-tech future, the game follows Ghost, an artificial intelligence working with a pair of hackers against a shady android corporation.

It was released on June 7, 2016 on Steam and later for GOG. It was released for the Xbox One and Nintendo Switch in July 2018, and for the PlayStation 4 on April 8, 2019. The game received generally positive reviews that praised the game's visual style, story, and action but criticized its humor.

== Gameplay ==
Ghost (center) shooting at one of the game's bosses

In Ghost 1.0, players play as a gynoid known as the Chassis, controlled by a female humanoid known as Ghost. As an artificial intelligence, Ghost has the ability to use the Chassis as her physical body and engage in combat by shooting enemies and using other weapons and techniques. Ghost can also abandon the Chassis, leaving it defenseless and traveling the world as a virtual "ghost" to hack into other robots and take them over. This can be used to find secrets or to destroy other robots that would otherwise be dangerous. If the Chassis is destroyed, it is automatically replicated by a 3D printer.

In typical Metroidvania fashion, the player is expected to explore the game world and collect various access cards and other items that will unlock the next area of the game. At certain points at the end of a level, the player must fight bosses to proceed. Certain rooms contain alarms that must be triggered, causing a gauntlet of enemies that can be fought repeatedly for more money (in the form of energy).

The player can unlock skills through the use of a skill tree. The player gains skill points based on how many access codes they have obtained, rather than by leveling up in the traditional sense by defeating enemies. However, the player can upgrade weapons in a more traditional manner.

The game also contains puzzle sections in the form of a laser-dodging minigame, where the player must possess one or more robots to make it past a laser grid that will destroy the robots on contact. An infiltration and rescue mission involving this towards the game's end can be skipped if the player so chooses.

== Plot ==
The game takes place in the future, and revolves around two intelligent but socially awkward cybercriminals, the roboticist Boogan (Jonathan Jones) and the hacker Jacker (Andrew Miller). The two of them desire to infiltrate the space station owned by the Nakamura Corporation, which is the world's largest and wealthiest producer of androids. They believe that Nakamura holds the source code for their highly intelligent androids, or "Nakas", within the station, since all the androids are controlled from a single server room. They find a contact named Viktor (Steven Kelly) who claims to have a number of freelance spies who work for him, and they hire one named "Ghost" (Mirisha Lottich) from him to sneak into the station via space elevator.

They tell Ghost to do whatever is necessary to capture the artificial intelligence code, believing they can sell it to the highest bidder and become rich. However, as Ghost shuts down various parts of the station, her behavior starts to become unusual. Boogan and Jacker begin to suspect that Ghost is actually a sentient AI that resides on the same server as the Nakas. They also discover that Nakamura is synthesizing organic compounds aboard the station for some reason.

To test their theory of Ghost being an AI, they cause a massive power fluctuation, which also causes Ghost to lose her connection, proving them right. Meanwhile, Viktor is angered that Boogan and Jacker are sabotaging his agents and sends a real human agent to destroy Ghost's chassis. Ghost narrowly escapes from Viktor's agent, but Viktor decides to target Jacker instead, kidnapping him and putting him deep underground to blackmail Boogan to stop.

Ghost leaves the station and goes with Boogan to rescue Jacker, successfully infiltrating the highly secured underground compound. She then returns to the station and accesses the server room. There, she realizes that all the "servers" were in fact human brains being fed nutrients by the station. Viktor attempts to kill her by destroying her disembodied brain, but one of the station's scientists saves her by putting her brain onto a robot with a force field. Ghost is then able to fight off waves of defense robots while Jacker defeats Viktor's hired hacker and manages to hide Ghost's brain forever by scrambling the entire database of the brains' serial numbers.

At the end of the story, it is revealed that Nakamura purchased a bankrupt cryonics company that had stored thousands of brains, revived them using technology they invented, and erased their memories to profit from using them to control robotic avatars through a brain-computer interface. Viktor was in on the plan and purchased some of the brains to use as powerful agents. All the Nakas are set free and given human rights, recognizing their status as cyborgs, while the CEO of Nakamura (Alex Jenks) is arrested. Ghost decides to join Boogan and Jacker as a permanent member of their team, much to their shock.

== Reception ==
Ghost 1.0 received generally positive reviews, with an aggregate score of 80/100 on Metacritic for the PC version of the game.

Ramon Nafria of Vandal Online rated the game 9/10, calling it "one of the best Metroidvanias we've played in the last few years". David Jagneaux of Nintendo Life rated the game's Switch version 7/10, praising the gameplay mechanics as "subtle and clever". He also praised the game's world design as making internal sense and called the game's soundtrack "rocking". However, he criticized the game's story as "forgettable" with "cheesy", "cringe-inducing" humor.

== Prequel ==
A retro-styled prequel to the game, Mini Ghost, was released on April 28, 2017 for Windows. It features graphics styled after those of the MSX, and includes a multiplayer mode.

== See also ==
- Unepic
- UnMetal
