= Unepic =

2011 video game

- Developer: Francisco Téllez de Meneses
- Publisher: Ninagamers
- Platforms: Linux, OS X, Microsoft Windows, Nintendo Switch, Wii U, PlayStation 4, PlayStation Vita, Xbox One
- Release: Windows: WW: September 30, 2011; Wii U: NA: January 16, 2014; EU: January 23, 2014; OS X, Linux: WW: November 11, 2014; XBO: WW: January 8, 2016; PS4, PSV: WW: March 29, 2016; Switch: WW: December 15, 2017
- Genres: Platformer, role-playing, Metroidvania
- Modes: Single-player, multiplayer

Unepic (stylized as UnEpic) is a role-playing platformer video game developed by Francisco Téllez de Meneses and various collaborators and published by Ninagamers for Windows, MacOS, Linux, Wii U, PlayStation Vita, PlayStation 4, Xbox One, and Nintendo Switch.

Unepic was released on September 30, 2011. Since its release, it has been translated into over 10 languages and has been made available on Steam, Desura, GOG.com, the PlayStation Store, the Xbox Games Store, and the Nintendo eShop.

== Gameplay ==
A screenshot of the main character exploring a cave

Unepic is a role-playing platformer game with Metroidvania elements and nonlinear gameplay, inspired by the 1987 MSX game The Maze of Galious. Players can use a number of melee and ranged weapons and armors as determined by their level and skill points assigned to an applicable type of equipment. Simple crafting for potions is also available in limited locations, and merchants are present throughout the game, believing the player is a possessed monster. "UnEpic Points" are awarded for completion of long and difficult challenges, and can be used to purchase powerful equipment such as laser guns, flamethrowers, and rocket launchers.

== Reception ==
Reception

Aggregate score
Aggregator	Score
Metacritic	68/100

Review score
Publication	Score
Destructoid	6.5/10

Unepic received generally mixed reviews, with the PC version receiving a Metacritic score of 68 out of 100, based on 5 critic reviews. It received a score of 6.5/10 on Destructoid. The game ranked 10th at the Indie of the Year awards of 2011. Unepic was included in the July Jubilee bundle on Indie Royale.

== See also ==
- Ghost 1.0
- UnMetal
