= Survivor (1987 video game) =

1980s action computer game

- Developers: Rafael Gomez; Rafael Angel Garcia Cabrera; Gominolas; Javier Cano; Julio Martín Erro
- Publishers: Topo Soft; U.S. Gold
- Platforms: Amstrad CPC, MSX, ZX Spectrum
- Release: 1987
- Genres: Action game, platform game
- Mode: Single-player

Survivor is an action game released in 1987 by the Spanish software house Topo Soft and later re-released in the UK by U.S. Gold. It was published for several 8-bit formats including Amstrad CPC, MSX and ZX Spectrum.

== Overview ==
The player takes control of an alien (who bears a striking resemblance to the race of aliens from the Alien series of films) aboard a huge spacecraft filled with many extraterrestrial creatures. The player must perpetuate the alien's race by finding ten pods on the ship and introducing them to the incubators.

The ship itself is split into 142 areas divided into four zones. These zones are joined by doors or air-vents (which the player can crawl through). The zones also consist of different levels connected by lifts.

The pods are found in large rooms which are different from the corridors and vents which make up much of the spacecraft and more closely resemble the sort of room found in 1980s platform games.

Some creatures on the ship are dangerous and the player can spit paralysing acid at them.

The player has a limited amount of energy which can be sapped by hostile creatures on the ship or defence systems. This energy can be replenished by managing to place a pod in an incubator or by eating one of the technicians which can be found wandering around the ship.

== Reception ==
Reception

Review score
Publication	Score
ACE	604/1000
