= El Tesoro de Isla Alcachofa =

2000 video game

- Developer(s): Alcachofa Soft
- Publisher(s): Alcachofa Soft
- Release: August 8, 2000
- Genre(s): Graphic adventure
- Mode(s): Single-player

El Tesoro de Isla Alcachofa is a 2000 Spanish video game by Alcachofa Soft. It is the first video game the developers made under their newly incorporated company 'Alcachofa Soft'.

== Production ==
=== Development ===
Alcachofa Soft by this point had been around for a few years; the developers' first game had been 1996's Dráscula: The Vampire Strikes Back, and despite it having good reviews they were not overly pleased with their creation - they endeavoured to make their following projects more ambitious and innovative.

The process of creating the game was "laborious and long". The game incorporated "interactive humour", and a narrative inspiration from Treasure Island. The team wanted to have a 2D graphic adventure, and to distinguish themselves from the soon to be released Monkey Island 3, they hand drew the characters rather than on a computer. Alcachofa Soft suggested that their game had "one of the best dubbing, if not the best, in the history of video games in Spanish", including their main character portrayed by regular Will Smith dubber and the voice of Fry in Futurama Iván Muelas. The soundtrack was recorded at Albert Moraleda's studio in Barcelona by a section of musicians from the Vallés Symphony Orchestra. Its technology was provided by DirectX, while the design featured hand-painted backgrounds, and 16 bit colour graphics. The game was in development for over two years. The soundtrack included the "Canción del Pirata Campeón" composed by Emilio de Paz and performed by the group "Los Inhumanos".

=== Release ===
The game became Alcachofa Soft's first effort entirely independently, without a publisher or external distributor. Meristation felt the game had an opportunity to captivate the national adventure market though felt it was possible for global permeation. The developers put out a special message requesting players not to pirate the game. As part of its coverage of the game, CTV published a multi-part section entitled How El Tesoro de Isla Alcachofa was made. In 2000, Alcachofa Soft distributed more than 100,000 units of both "Isla Alcachofa" and "Mortadelo y Filemón", just within Spanish territories. The developer aimed to release a second version of the title featuring a 1024x768 resolution and new puzzles.

In 2009, Alcachofa Soft undertook a new distribution strategy by launching an "Alcachofa Essentials" label under which they sold low-cost downloadable version of its best classics, such as "Mortadelo y Filemón: Una aventura de cine" and "El Tesoro de Isla Alcachofa" with improvements such as unpublished "extra" material.

== Plot and gameplay ==
Jim Guinderslifth stands in a building. The player has opened the inventory across the top of the screen.

The plot revolves around a petty thief named Jim Guinderslifth who has caught wind of an expedition leaving Bristol to discover a new continent. He soon realises that they are on a quest to find the lost treasure of Pirate Frink which is supposedly held at Alcachofa Island.

== Critical reception ==
In a contemporary review, Meristation suggested the game would appeal to those who were nostalgic for the gameplay and narrative of The Secret of Monkey Island, adding that the title was coherent, balanced and fun. In a retrospective piece, Meristation deemed it competent, but lacking in the qualities to make it a high value video game. In another article, they mentioned that while many Spanish video game received poor reviews, this is one game that was saved from negative criticism and further deemed it "especially remarkable" within the context of Alcachofa Soft's output. Vandal deemed it "most ambitious". Conversational Adventures Newsletter Number 44 commented on the "crazy sense of humor and the hilarious dialogues". Historia del software español de entretenimiento felt that considering the game's tiny budget, the quality is "remarkable". La Mazmorra Abandon assessed the game was a "not very ambitious title" and suggested it was created out of a developer passion project rather than to complete in the adventure gaming market. Gry Online felt it was a less classic, "lighter" example of the pirate video gaming genre.

== See also ==
- Gilbert Goodmate and the Mushroom of Phungoria
- Hollywood Monsters
- Runaway: A Road Adventure
