= Gilbert Goodmate and the Mushroom of Phungoria =

2001 video game

- Developer: Prelusion Games Inc.
- Publisher: FastTrak Software Publishing Ltd.
- Designers: Lorne Laliberte, Daniel Nilsson
- Programmer: Michael Ziganek
- Writers: Lorne Laliberte, Daniel Nilsson
- Platforms: Windows; Windows Phone
- Release: June 8, 2001
- Genre: Adventure

Gilbert Goodmate and the Mushroom of Phungoria is a 2001 point-and-click adventure game, re-released on Steam on June 23, 2015.

== Critical reception ==
Game Over Online said: "Overall, Gilbert Goodmate is a pretty good adventure. I enjoyed playing it much more than Myst 3, and while it isn't as funny as the funniest parts of last year's Escape from Monkey Island, it also doesn't have anything as annoying as Monkey Kombat in it. So if you're looking for an adventure to play, and especially if you're looking for an adventure that doesn't take itself very seriously, then Gilbert Goodmate is an excellent choice". Adventurearchiv wrote: "I really enjoyed Gilbert Goodmate very much – although or even because some puzzles made me really crazy. I enjoyed the humor, the sly hints on LucasArts and others and spent actually almost 40 hours with it. It is by the way the first time that I watched the credits more than three times and can only recommend not to miss them".

Eurogamer.net (UK) wrote: "Coming hot on the heels of recent releases such as Stupid Invaders and Escape From Monkey Island, Gilbert Goodmate proves once again that the adventure game genre is still far from dead". Quandary said: "The ending is a little abrupt and it seemed to come all too soon as I was having so much fun, but Prelusion's very first (as far as I know) effort at making an adventure game is quite exceptional. You can tell that it was made by people who love adventure games, it exudes enthusiasm and it was very likely over enthusiasm that encouraged so much dialogue. An independent editor may have helped. However, if you are feeling in the mood for a delightfully whimsical adventure invite Gilbert home for a while. I'm glad I did and I'm hoping he'll be back sometime in the future".

ActionTrip said: "When you look at all the good and bad sides of it, Gilbert Goodmate is still a nice adventure game that should be played. I might have been a bit harsh towards it in writing this review, but I sure had fun while playing it. Its technical aspects are definitely far from perfect, but its story and all other things most important in real adventure games make it worth a try". GameSpy wrote: "Gilbert Goodmate is not an epic adventure, it's not technically innovative or genre-bending and it's not particularly original. What it is, is a pleasant, whimsical adventure that provides a leisurely stroll down memory lane for people who yearn for the good old days. If you fit that description, Gilbert Goodmate is a no-brainer must-buy".

Adventure Gamers said that "Gilbert Goodmate and the Mushroom of Phungoria, released during a very dry season of releases in 2001, certainly generated lots of interest among the fans of traditional point-and-click adventures". Just Adventure wrote: "Gilbert Goodmate and the Mushroom of Phungoria is a noble, but ultimately failed, attempt to recapture the magic of LucasArts circa 1995. If the game had patterned itself after the inspired lunacy of the outtakes, it would have sparkled and may have inspired a revitalization of the dormant 2D comedy genre. Instead, the humor is forced and laborious, the plot is stale and redundant, and the dialogue, while well-written, goes on and on and on for so long that it makes the extended conversations from The Longest Journey seem like a short story in comparison".

Puntaeclicca.it and PC Games (Germany) gave the game 70 out of 100. GameStar (Germany) rated it 64/100, and Absolute Games (AG.ru) gave it 55/100. Matzomagic rated it 4 stars, commenting: "Gilbert Goodmate really is a very entertaining game with bright and cheerful graphics, a host of fun characters, lots of things to do and a very good soundtrack".

== See also ==
- El Tesoro de Isla Alcachofa
- Runaway: A Road Adventure
- Traitors Gate
