= King Lucas =

2016 adventure video game

- Developer: DevilishGames
- Engine: Unity
- Platforms: Windows; OS X; Linux
- Release: December 1, 2016
- Genre: Adventure
- Modes: Single-player; Multiplayer

King Lucas is an adventure video game released on December 1, 2016, by Spanish developer DevilishGames. Players take on the role as knights to help find King Lucas' lost daughters. A castle will be built at random and it is the player's mission to find them inside. Upon every succession, the search gets more difficult - the area of the castle gets bigger and players will eventually have to search through a castle with over 1,000 rooms.

King Lucas comes in two gameplay modes: solo and multiplayer. In the multiplayer mode, players compete to be the first one to locate the daughters.

The game is available in three languages: English, Spanish, Russian.
