= Alcachofa Soft =

Spanish video game developer

- Industry: Video games
- Founded: 1995; 31 years ago
- Founders: Emilio de Paz
- Headquarters: Toledo, Spain
- Key people: Emilio de Paz; Ramón Hernáez; Santiago Lancha
- Products: Dráscula: The Vampire Strikes Back; Mortadelo y Filemón: El Sulfato Atómico; El Tesoro de Isla Alcachofa
- Website: alcachofasoft.com

Alcachofa Soft was a video game developer in Toledo, Spain, founded in 1995 and specializing in graphic adventure games.

== History ==
Its first work was the game Dráscula: The Vampire Strikes Back, a comedy adventure.

In 1997, it made Ping Pong. In 1998, it made Mortadelo y Filemón: El Sulfato Atómico, a graphic adventure based on the Spanish comic characters Mort & Phil and distributed by Grupo Zeta. It was successful and led to similar games based on the characters.

In 2000, it published El Tesoro de Isla Alcachofa, a pirate adventure game which was Alcachofa Soft's first entirely independent product, without a publisher or external distributor.

Other Mort & Phil-based games it made were Mortadelo y Filemón: Dos Vaqueros Chapuceros and Mortadelo y Filemón: Terror, Espanto y Pavor (2000), Mortadelo y Filemón: Operación Moscú and Mortadelo y Filemón: El Escarabajo de Cleopatra (2001), Mortadelo y Filemón: Balones y patadones and Mortadelo y Filemón: Mamelucos a la romana (2002) and Mortadelo y Filemón: Una Aventura de Cine (2003).

In 2008, it made Murder in the Abbey, an homage to La Abadía del Crimen.
