= Dragon City =

Social network game

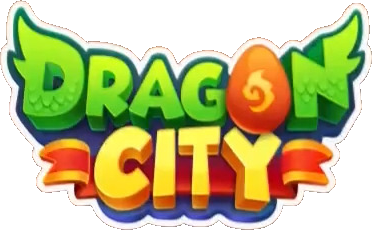
- Logo since 2022
- Developer: Socialpoint
- Publisher: Socialpoint
- Composer: Eduardo Felix Ruiz Martinez
- Platforms: Facebook(formerly), iOS, Android, Microsoft Windows
- Release: May 2012: iOS; March 21, 2013; Android; October 2013; Microsoft Windows; February 26, 2019
- Genre: Social network game
- Modes: Single-player, multiplayer

Dragon City is a 2012 free-to-play social network game developed and published by Socialpoint. First released for Facebook, the game has since been ported to mobile devices and Microsoft Windows. In the game, players collect, breed, and raise dragons, which can then be used to battle other players in both single-player and multiplayer modes. The game has seen several updates and changes over the years, including a new logo introduced in 2022. Eduardo Felix Ruiz Martinez composed the original score for the game.

== Gameplay ==
Dragon City tasks players to raise their dragons and design a city full of dragons on floating islands. Gold produced by dragons can be used to buy and upgrade buildings and habitats. Farms can be used to grow food, which can be used to level up dragons, improving their strength depending on the dragon's rarity, and increase gold production. Two dragons that are at least Level 4 can also be bred together to produce a new hybrid dragon, with a chance of its species and elements changing. In addition to raising the dragons, players can use them to battle other players' dragons through League Battles. These battles can award resources such as Gems and Food which can expedite the game's progression.

Aside from raising dragons and taking them to battle, players can participate in limited-time events that allow them to obtain new and exclusive dragons. There is a multitude of events that have different requirements for their rewards.

Once a player has reached Level 27, the Ancient World can be accessed, which is an area of the game where Gold can be exchanged for Crystals (ruby, sapphire, topaz, emerald, onyx, and diamond) which can be collected from mines that can be used to summon and evolve Ancient Dragons. The crafting station is used to craft better tiers (Note: The tiers of crystals are Raw, Clean, Pure, Fine, Neat, Bright, Squared, Carved, Oval, and Perfect. 1 of a tier of crystal can be made using 5 of the tier below.) of crystals using lower-tier crystals and platinum. Platinum is generated by the ancient dragons, similar to how the regular dragons generate gold. There are six unique habitats for the dragons summoned here, one for each Ancient Element and its three accompanying Ancient dragons, with each Ancient dragon also having the Ancient element and one regular element. The Ancient dragons cannot be used in combat or be brought outside of the Ancient World.

There are 22 total elements in the game; dragons can have up to 4 elements, which they can also learn moves from. The regular elements are Terra, Flame, Sea, Nature, Electric, Ice, Metal, Dark, Light, War, Pure, Legend, (Note: Can be rarely obtained by breeding two Pure dragons together.) Primal, Wind, and Time. There are also seven elements relating to the Ancient World; the Ancient element itself, along with Beauty, Magic, Chaos, Happy, Dream, and Soul. (Note: Time was added in the 10th Birthday Update, and the Ancient elements were added upon the release of the Ancient World.)

There are 7 rarities of dragons, which are Common, Rare, Very Rare, Epic, Legendary, Heroic, and Mythical. On 15 April 2016, the Heroic rarity was introduced alongside the first Heroic dragon, the High Fenrir Dragon. Around 2018, the Mythical rarity was added to the game alongside the first new Mythical dragon, the Mythmarvelous Dragon. Several Legendary dragons had their rarity promoted to Mythical after the update.

== Release ==
Dragon City was released on Facebook in May 8,2012, and on iOS and Android in 2013. On February 26, 2019, the Microsoft Windows version of the game was released. On February 10, 2020, the Facebook version of the game was closed.
