= Little Racers =

2011 video game

- Developer: Milkstone Studios
- Publisher: Milkstone Studios
- Designer: Alejandro González
- Artist: Miguel Herrero
- Platforms: Xbox 360, Windows, OS X, Linux
- Release: July 27, 2011: Xbox 360; February 6, 2014: Windows, OS X, Linux
- Genre: Racing
- Modes: Single-player, multiplayer

Little Racers is a racing game by Spanish developer Milkstone Studios for the Xbox 360 published in 2011. In February 2014, it was released for the Microsoft Windows, OS X, and Linux, as Little Racers STREET.

== Gameplay ==
The main gameplay mechanics of Little Racers are similar to other Top-down Racing games such as Super Sprint, Indy Heat and Super Off Road.
