= Hero of Sparta II =

2010 video game

- Developer: Gameloft Barcelona
- Publisher: Gameloft
- Platforms: iOS, Bada
- Release: 29 July 2010
- Genres: Action-adventure, hack and slash
- Mode: Single player

Hero of Sparta II is an action-adventure game developed by Gameloft Barcelona and published by Gameloft for the iOS and Bada. It was released on 29 July 2010 and is a sequel to the 2008 game Hero of Sparta. The game follows the player's efforts as Argos, an ancient Greek king, as he attempts to save the city of Sparta from the demonic armies of Hades.

== Story ==
The game begins where its predecessor left off, as Argos emerges from the Underworld on his ship. As he sets sail towards Sparta, Hades suddenly appears in the sky, and threatens that should Argos set foot in Sparta, the armies of the Underworld will be unleashed and will destroy Argos' world. Argos nevertheless attempts to defy Hades, and continues forwards to the shores. As Hades had warned, demonic creatures shoot up from the ground as soon as Argos steps off his ship.

Argos makes his way back to the city, which is being completely destroyed by a large Manticore. Argos hunts the beast through Sparta before eventually confronting and brutally slaying it in the city theatre. However, Hades informs Argos that the Manticore attack was only the beginning of an endless torment, and that he must seek out Selene, the goddess of the moon, if he wishes to undo what he did.

Argos travels to Selene's temple, but finds that it is submerged deep beneath a lake. Selene appears before Argos and tells him that draining the lake will be his first great test. Argos travels around the lake and manages to drain the lake using a large pipeline system, on his way finding a pair of golden wings. He then proceeds to enter the temple, where he finds the Crown of Meteors. Selene appears again and says that the Crown and the wings were two of several items that he must find on his quest, and that she can guide him no longer. However, she tells him that Pegasus is locked up at the bottom of the temple, and that Argos must release him in order to carry on. Argos finds and releases Pegasus before evacuating the temple; however, he first has to escape from the Guardian, a gigantic water entity, as it attempts to stop him from leaving with Pegasus.

After escaping from the Guardian, Pegasus flies Argos to Egypt, where he is stopped in his tracks by a woman calling herself 'the Sphinx Master'. She tells Argos that he may go no further and proceeds to battle him; however, he manages to defeat her before taking the Sphinx Claws, her signature weapons. As she dies on the ground, the Sphinx Master reveals that his visit was foreseen in a prophecy, and tells him to go forth to an underground temple at the end of the valley ahead. Argos follows her directions to the underground temple, where he finds the Thunder Spear, another mystical weapon.

Pegasus takes Argos back to Greece, but they are struck down by the Colossus, which is guarding the road ahead. Argos heads over a pile of destroyed ships towards the Colossus before defeating it by catapulting himself into the monster's head. He then heads through the gate the Colossus was guarding, and finds that it leads to the fortress of Khronos, the god of time. Now aware of his final goal, Argos scales the fortress and defeats Khronos. He then harnesses the god's power, and travels back in time to the point when he emerged from the Underworld. Rather than heading back to Sparta like he did before, he instead turns the ship around and sails away, preventing the apocalypse from ever happening.

== Gameplay ==
The game consists of 11 levels where the player controls Argos as he fights through Hades' armies. Argos collects "orbs" from his fallen enemies; green for health, and blue for mana. He can also find "seals", hidden power-ups that can be used to upgrade weapons in various ways. These seals come as the elements of Earth, Fire, Water, and Air. After collecting a set of them (Three seals to a set) Your weapon of choice will be granted a special power. When enemies are weakened, Argos can also activate quick-time events to kill them. Doing so will earn Argos more orbs, and sometimes it is necessary for advancing the story.

== Reception ==
Reception

Aggregate score
Aggregator	Score
Metacritic	81/100

Review score
Publication	Score
IGN	7.5/10

Hero of Sparta II received positive reception from video game critics.
