= Star Dust (1987 video game) =

1987 video game

- Developer: Topo Soft
- Publisher: U.S. Gold (Kixx)
- Platforms: ZX Spectrum, Amstrad CPC, MS-DOS, MSX
- Release: UK: 1987
- Genre: Scrolling shooter
- Modes: Single-player, multiplayer

Star Dust is a vertically scrolling shooter developed by Spanish studio Topo Soft and released in the UK by Kixx in 1987 for the ZX Spectrum. The full version was included on a Sinclair User covertape in 1991. It was also released for Amstrad CPC, MS-DOS, and MSX.

The introductory screens include music composed by Pablo Toledo. The same music was later re-used for the game Bronx.

== Gameplay ==
The player controls a small space ship called an "Astrohunter", which flies over the surface of a series of large enemy supercruisers on their way to attack Earth. The player must avoid or destroy various ground targets and free-flying drones in order to eventually reach an array of shield generators. The ship is equipped with a gun that can be improved by collecting power-ups, and a second weapon that targets objects on the ground.

When all the supercruisers have been passed, the Astrohunter lands in an enemy starship and its pilot continues on foot to reach the shield generators. After destroying the generators the pilot must be returned to the ship to escape.
