= Mortadelo y Filemón: Una Aventura de Cine =

2000 video game

- Box art for Mortadelo y Filemón: Una Aventura de Cine
- Developer: Alcachofa Soft
- Publisher: Crimson Cow
- Platform: Microsoft Windows
- Release: ESP: December 2000; DEU: November 2004
- Genre: Adventure game

Mortadelo y Filemón: Una Aventura de Cine is a 2000 adventure video game developed by Spanish studio Alcachofa Soft for Microsoft Windows. The game was later re-released in Spain in November 2003 and in Germany in 2004 by Crimson Cow.

The game is in German and was not localized into English.

It is the third game in the Mort & Phil adventure game series, following El Sulfato Atómico (1998) by Alcachofa Soft and La Máquina Meteoroloca (1999) by Vega Creaciones Multimedia.

== See also ==
- Pendulo Studios
- Runaway: A Road Adventure
