= Hero of Sparta =

2008 video game

- Developer: Gameloft Barcelona
- Publisher: Gameloft
- Producer: Philip Bouchet
- Designer: Alexandru Adam
- Artists: Arthur Hugot; Christophe Latour
- Composer: Eduardo Broseta
- Platforms: Java ME; Android; Symbian^3 iOS; PlayStation Portable (PSP Minis); Nintendo DS (DSiWare)
- Release: NA: December 9, 2008; WW: 2008
- Genres: Action-adventure; Hack-and-slash
- Mode: Single-player

Hero of Sparta is an action-adventure hack-and-slash video game developed by Spanish studio Gameloft Barcelona and published by Gameloft; it was released for Java ME -based mobile phones, Android, iOS, Nintendo DS, and PlayStation Portable in 2008. A high-definition (HD) version was also released for some Android and Symbian devices and iOS. Both versions have been removed from the Google Play Store; the game is now only available for Android devices via Gameloft's official website. The game follows a storyline set in ancient Greece, wherein the player controls the protagonist throughout multiple landscapes while fighting mythical beasts. It game was moderately well received by critics, and its 2D version was re-released in the late 2010s in two Gameloft Java game compilations: Gameloft Classics: Action and Gameloft Classics: 20 Years.

== Gameplay ==
The game consists of eight levels (thirteen in the Java version and five in the DS version) in which the player controls a Spartan king wielding a sword, an unbreakable shield, Andromeda chains, Medusa's shield, Chronos' sword, etc. and fighting various mythical beasts. The player can collect different-colored orbs by defeating enemies, with each color corresponding to a different effect. Green orbs restore health, blue restore magical energy, and red orbs grant experience points that can be used to upgrade the damage and special powers of weapons found throughout the course of the game. In some versions of the game, upgrading weapons to their maximum capacities will cause them to take on an "ultimate" form.

The game features real-time events called "focus kills" that occur when certain enemies are nearly defeated. The player will be prompted to input a series of controls (or tap the screen) to perform a finishing blow on the enemy. Successful focus kills award the player with more orbs. In some cases, the player is required to perform focus kills to defeat bosses.

== Plot ==
=== 3D version ===
The story centers around the Spartan king Argos as he awakens on a beach shortly after his entire fleet of ships has been wiped out by a violent storm. While exploring the island, the spirit of an oracle apparently held in captivity pleads for Argos to rescue her. In exchange, the oracle offers to use her power to return Argos to his homeland.

== Reception ==
Reception

Review scores
| Publication | Score |
|---|---|
| IGN | iOS: 9/10; PSP: 7.5/10; DS: 6/10; 6.5/10(HD version) |
| Slide to Play | 4/4 |
| UGO | B+ |
| PSP Minis | 6/10 |

Award
| Publication | Award |
|---|---|
| IGN | Editors' Choice Award |

The game has been directly compared to the God of War franchise.

== Sequel ==
The sequel, Hero of Sparta II, was released on July 29, 2010 for iOS and the Bada operating system; it follows Argos embarking on a new adventure after he returns to Sparta.
