= Zack Zero =

2012 video game

- Developer: Crocodile Entertainment
- Publisher: Crocodile Entertainment
- Platforms: PlayStation 3, Windows
- Release: PS3: NA: January 17, 2012; EU: January 11, 2012; Windows: WW: April 29, 2013
- Genre: Platform-adventure
- Mode: Single-player

Zack Zero is a 2.5D platform-adventure video game developed and published by Crocodile Entertainment. It was released for PlayStation 3 (via PlayStation Network) on January 17, 2012, and Microsoft Windows (via Steam) on April 29, 2013.

The player helps Zack Zero save his partner Marlene from Evil Zulrog who wishes to exchange her for a unique material involved in time travel called Kelestinia.

== Reception ==
Reception

Aggregate scores
Aggregator	Score
GameRankings	57.25%
Metacritic	60/100

Review scores
Publication	Score
Destructoid	3/10
GameSpot	4/10
IGN	4/10
Playstation Universe	8/10
M.E. Gamers	8/10
