= Zombie Panic in Wonderland =

2010 video game

- Developer: Akaoni Studio
- Publishers: Akaoni Studio: JP: Marvelous Entertainment (Wii); JP: Arc System Works (3DS)
- Designer: Jose M. Iñiguez
- Programmers: Carlos Campaña; Atsuhito Saito
- Artists: Bomi; David Fernández Huerta; Alex Fernández Pons
- Platforms: Wii (WiiWare), Nintendo 3DS eShop, iOS, Android, Nintendo Switch, Microsoft Windows
- Release: March 16, 2010: Wii; JP: March 16, 2010 (Wiiware); EU: April 9, 2010; NA: May 3, 2010 Plus March 1, 2012 DX 3DS; NA/EU: October 30, 2012; JP: March 25, 2015 iOS April 5, 2015 (iOS) Switch; NA/EU: January 25, 2019; JP: November 21, 2019 Windows November 6, 2019
- Genres: Third-person shooter, shooting gallery
- Modes: Single player, multiplayer

Zombie Panic in Wonderland, known in Japan as Zombie in Wonderland (ゾンビ イン ワンダーランド, Zonbi in Wandārando), is a third-person shooter for Wii released in 2010 by Spanish videogame developer Akaoni Studio. The game was first released in Japan by Marvelous Entertainment on March 16, 2010. It was later released by Akaoni Studio in the same year for Europe and North America. An updated version of the game, Zombie Panic in Wonderland Plus, was released on the iTunes App Store for the Apple iPod Touch, iPhone and iPad, and on the Google Play Store for Android devices in 2012, but was since taken down. Another version of the game, Zombie Panic in Wonderland DX, was released for Nintendo 3DS on October 30, 2014, for iOS devices on April 5, 2015, for Nintendo Switch on January 25, 2019, and for Microsoft Windows via Steam on November 6, 2019.

== Story ==
In order to become the centre of attention, a self-centered prince develops by error a magical perfume that turns everybody who smells it into a zombie. Characters from all over the popular eastern and western fable world, such as Snow White, Momotaro, Alice, Dorothy and Little Red Riding Hood will have to confront the 'amorous zombies' who are invading the Fairy Tale world in order to resolve the mystery of Prince Charming and his 'scented dwarfs' before it is too late.

== Plot ==
The story begins in setting as Momotaro walks into town, remarking of how he has not been in town for a long time. He finds the town deserted and everything seems to be intact. Momotaro is attacked in a sweet shop by zombies, and defends himself and makes his way to his friends. After a brief battle at the festival grounds, he reaches an animal shrine in which he is attacked by his friends, all fused into one zombie. He defeats them, and before falling unconscious, the monkey says, 'Scented Dwarves...' He finds a cage nearby, and cuts it open, revealing dwarves. They have no idea of the occurrences, and only say the zombies were going to take them north. Momotaro begins to make his way north, and encounters Dorothy(The Wizard of Oz). She has been looking for the Tin Man, who had been acting strange since dwarves had run through Oz. She joins his party, as they fight through Oz, the situation being no better than Momotaro's village. They encounter the Tin Man, who has been affected by the plague, and fight him. As he is defeated, before he burns out, he only mutters something about scented dwarves. They find more dwarves locked up nearby, being sent to a castle in the north. They continue to battle more of the infected, and they reach the castle. They find Snow White, who is arguing with a knight, trying to get inside of the castle. She fights a knight, and they are swarmed by zombies, and the knights, including the inhabitants of the castle, are also affected. Once inside, they find Prince Charming, who has some demonic characteristics, who still retains all of his intellect. Snow White begins to argue with him, and he tells her to calm down, since she is making a scene. The statement provokes a fight, and he is defeated, revealing that he made the plague, since he wanted the inhabitants of Wonderland to fall in love with him. He went further with the plan, to become immortal, and apologizes for the trouble. He gives a potion, which is the cure, and it states they all live Happily Ever After.

== Different versions ==
=== Zombie Panic in Wonderland Plus ===
This version was released on iOS and Android devices in 2011, but was later pulled back from Android's Playstore. It was a free downloadable version that offers in-app purchases for more content. Comparing to the original WiiWare version, it has improved graphics and sound, a new, touch-friendly control scheme as well as new levels and enemies.

=== Zombie Panic in Wonderland DX ===
This version is a complete overhaul of the original game, presenting improved gameplay (with touch controls for the 3DS), as well as better graphics and enemy AI. It was released for Nintendo 3DS family devices, iOS devices, Nintendo Switch and PC Steam. There was a free (lite) version available for download on the App Store.

== Reception ==
Reception

Aggregate score
Aggregator	Score
Metacritic	(3DS) 72/100 (Wii) 65/100 (iOS) 60/100

Review scores
Publication	Score
The A.V. Club	(Wii) D
Eurogamer	(Wii) 6/10
GamePro	(Wii) 3/5
GamesMaster	(Wii) 50%
MeriStation	(Wii) 8.5/10
NGamer	(Wii) 60%
Nintendo Life	(Wii) 7/10 (3DS) 6/10
Nintendo World Report	(3DS) 7.5/10
Official Nintendo Magazine	(Wii) 64%
TouchArcade	(iOS) 3/5

The game was positively received in Japan, ranking first on the list for WiiWare sales. On December 20, 2007, Famitsu referred to the video game using the emblem "GJ!" (standing for good job) in a double page dedicated article.

Other specialized magazines such as Nintendo Dream vol. 193 and Dengeki Games vol. 6 have also shown their interest for the videogame.

All of these articles and their subsequent user comments make special emphasis on the surprisingly "Japanese" touch of every final aspect regarding this videogame.

The success of the game became so remarkable that the cinematographic production company of George A. Romero in Japan, introduced a tie-in of Zombie Panic in Wonderland in May 2010, along with their latest film release Survival of the Dead. This combined advertising strategy consisted on the distribution of posters, wallpapers and clocks for cell phones parodying the crossbreed between both products.

Overseas, the game received "mixed or average reviews" on all platforms, according to the review aggregation website Metacritic. Eurogamer criticized its difficulty, calling it 'annoying'. The following revisions did not gather the same attention as the original game, nor did its average score improve.
