= Grouch (video game) =

2000 video game

- Developer: Revistronic Games
- Publisher: Big City Games
- Platform: Windows
- Release: October 2000; 13 May 2003
- Genre: Action

Grouch, also known as Rocko's Quest in North America, is a Spanish 3D thriller action-adventure game developed by Revistronic Games for Microsoft Windows and published by Big City Games. First released in 2000, The game was later re-released on May 13, 2003, as Rocko's Quest, with the gore toned down.

== Reception ==
| Name of Website / Magazine | Date | Rate |
|---|---|---|
| Game Vortex | 2003 | 90 / 100 |
| Games Xtreme | Aug 10, 2001 | 8.9 / 10 |
| 7Wolf | Mar 27, 2001 | 7.9 / 10 |
| GameZone | Jun 02, 2003 | 5.9 / 10 |
| GameStar (Germany) | Jan, 2001 | 56 / 100 |
| Game Chronicles | Jun 14, 2003 | 4.5 / 10 |
| GamingExcellence | Jul 04, 2003 | 4.1 / 10 |
| PC Gamer | Sep, 2003 | 30 / 100 |
| PC Games (Germany) | Jan, 2001 | 26 / 100 |
| PC Action | Jan, 2001 | 25 / 100 |
