= Socialpoint =

Spanish video game developer

- Formerly: Social Point (2008–2019)
- Type: Subsidiary
- Industry: Video games
- Founded: 2008; 18 years ago
- Founders: Horacio Martos; Andrés Bou
- Headquarters: Barcelona, Spain
- Key people: Akshay Bharadwaj (head)
- Revenue: 85,000,000 euro (2015)
- Number of employees: 360 (2018)
- Parent: Take-Two Interactive (2017–present)
- Website: socialpoint.es

Socialpoint (formerly Social Point until 2019) is a Spanish video game developer based in Barcelona. Founded in October 2008 by Horacio Martos and Andrés Bou, the company specializes in free-to-play mobile and social network games. Socialpoint was acquired by Take-Two Interactive in February 2017.

== History ==
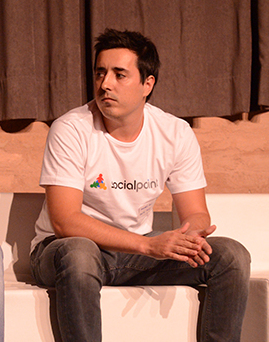
Andrés Bou (pictured in 2013) co-founded Socialpoint in 2008.

Social Point was founded by Andrés Bou and Horacio Martos in 2008. Between 2008 and 2011, they launched 25 online social games. In January 2011, Social Point released the battle and strategy game Social Empires.

In November 2011, Social Point released Social Wars and a mobile version of Social Empires. On 8 May 2012, they announced the release of Dragon City for Facebook.

In July 2012, Social Point announced it had closed a Series B round of venture capital funding to a total of $10 million. TechCrunch reported that funding for the B.1 round was provided by Nauta Capital, Idinvest Partners, and BBVA bank.

The Universitat Politècnica de Catalunya published an article in October 2012 announcing that Social Point was an official collaborator in its master's program in Videogames Design.

Spanish newspaper Expansión printed an article in February 2013, stating that Greylock Partners had invested €2.9 million in Social Point in December 2012.

Social Point announced the releases of iOS and Android versions of Dragon City on 21 March 2013 and 3 July 2013, respectively. In 2014, they launched a new title, Monster Legends, for Facebook, iOS, and Android.

In 2013, Social Point announced its partnership with the mSchools Initiative, a multi-year, multi-faceted education initiative led by the Mobile World Capital Barcelona.

Social Point confirmed that its staff would be involved in mentoring school children as part of the App Education Course element of the initiative: a computer science elective that was offered in Catalan high schools to teach students about application design and prototype development.

In August 2013, VentureBeat named Social Point one of the 20 fastest-growing mobile startups in the world.

According to the company, in 2015 it had a turnover of 85 million euros (50% coming from the United States) and its video games accumulated 180 million downloads.

In January 2016, the company launched a new title, World Chef, and two months later, Dragon Land.

In 2016, it generated $90 million in annual revenue and $20 million in profits, according to parent company Take-Two Interactive.

In December 2019, Social Point was rebranded as Socialpoint and introduced a new logo.

SocialPoint Games showreel, 2016

== Games developed ==
Year	Title	Platform(s)				Ref
Year	Title	Android	Facebook	Fire OS	iOS	
2011	Social Empires	Yes	Yes	No	No	
2011	Social Wars	No	Yes	No	No	
2012	Dragon City	Yes	Yes	Yes	Yes	
2013	Monster Legends	Yes	Yes	Yes	Yes	
2013	Jurassic Hunter	Yes	No	No	Yes	
2016	World Chef	Yes	No	No	Yes	
2016	Dragon Land	Yes	No	No	Yes	
2019	Tasty Town	Yes	No	No	Yes	
2019	Word Life	Yes	No	No	Yes	
2023	Top Troops	Yes	No	No	Yes	
