= Dráscula: The Vampire Strikes Back =

1996 video game

- Spanish cover art
- Developer(s): Alcachofa Soft
- Publisher(s): Digital Dreams Multimedia
- Release: 1996
- Genre(s): Graphic adventure
- Mode(s): Single-player

Dráscula: The Vampire Strikes Back (Spanish: Dráscula: El Vampiro) is a 1996 graphic adventure game developed by Alcachofa Soft. It was created in Spain, and was the first adventure game released by Alcachofa. In 1999, Midas Interactive Entertainment released an English version of the game in the United Kingdom. Dráscula tells the story of John Hacker, a realtor who attempts to help "Count Drascula" sell real estate in Transylvania.

In 2017, HobbyConsolas declared Dráscula one of the nine best Spanish graphic adventure games. The publication's Clara Castaño Ruiz wrote that the game was one of the pioneer games of the genre in Spain, along with Igor: Objective Uikokahonia. In 2012, MeriStation's César Otero noted that the game's politically incorrect style of comedy was "totally outdated nowadays" but nevertheless a "guilty pleasure".

Dráscula was commercially unsuccessful. GameLive PC's Gerard Masnou wrote in 2003 that "dismal distribution by DMM has prevented many players from enjoying this little cult classic". In 2008, Jack Allin of Adventure Gamers described the game as "rare". During September of that year, support for the game was added to ScummVM, after Alcachofa handed the source code to the program's team. Alcachofa subsequently re-released Dráscula as freeware.

== See also ==
- 3 Skulls of the Toltecs
- Hollywood Monsters
