= Topo Soft =

Spanish software house

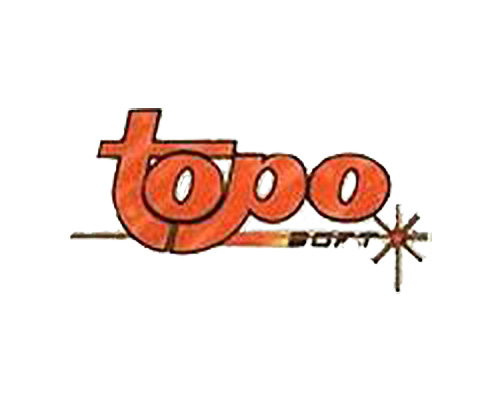
- Type: Defunct
- Industry: Video games
- Founded: 1986
- Headquarters: Spain

Topo Soft was a Spanish software house for 8-bit home computers that emerged during the eighties. They were part of the golden era of Spanish software. It dissolved in 1994 due to economic problems related with the late arrival of 16-bit computers in Spain. Some of its workers founded Pyro Studios in 1998. However, there are also criticisms, and in 2019 Eugenio Barahona and Cancho acknowledged that sometimes the planning to produce a certain number of video games affected the quality, leaving no time to "finish them off in conditions, or simply test them in order to balance their playability before releasing them for sale".

== The eighties, 8-bits ==
Topo Soft published multiple games for the MSX and PC such as Survivor, Stardust, Gremlins 2: The New Batch, and Desperado (published in England as Gun.Smoke).

== 16-bits ==
- Quickit, a graphical system to handle MS-DOS
