= Murder in the Abbey =

2008 video game

Murder In The Abbey
- Developer: Alcachofa Soft
- Publishers: DreamCatcher Interactive; Crimson Cow
- Platforms: Windows, macOS
- Release: August 26, 2008
- Genre: Adventure

Murder In The Abbey (released in some countries as The Abbey) is an adventure video game, developed by the Spanish studio Alcachofa Soft and released in 2008. The game is inspired by the 1987 title La Abadía del Crimen and the 1980 novel The Name of the Rose.

== Gameplay ==
Screenshot

The majority of the gameplay involves interrogating monks using the standard gameplay of a detective-themed adventure game. In addition, players collect an inventory of useful items, and have to complete logic puzzles. The game has a 3D-character-in-2D-backdrop art environment.

== Plot ==
The game is set in the Middle Ages, where a monk named Leonardo of Toledo is ordered to deliver the young Bruno to the Nuestra Señora de la Natividad Abbey for study with the local monks, a "dark, dastardly murder interferes with this kiddie drop-off".

== Development ==
Games4women observed that the "credits were heavily populated by German and Spanish names which most likely accounted for the authentic feel of the game". GameWatcher noted: "As a game set in a Christian monastery it deals with Christian themes of morality and right and wrong".

Around 70 minutes of music was written for the game, composed and directed by chief developer Emilio de Paz himself, and recorded by the Prague Symphony Orchestra.

== Critical reception ==
Adventure Classic Gaming gave the game a glowing review, writing it had "an exceptional production of an outstanding story, accompanied by fun, intuitive puzzles that seldom bog down the plot's progression". Similarly, Tap Repeatedly said the game had "a delightful, pleasantly surprising medieval mystery featuring colorful graphics, stiring music and excellent voice acting". Multiplayer.it likened the game's art style to that of Disney.

GameSpot said "Murder in the Abbey may not be entirely original, but it's an adventure with a lot of personality". IGN concluded: "Between the could've-been-awesome art, the never-could've-been-awesome-in-a-million-years voice acting, and the fact that monastery intrigue is a very niche proposition to begin with...Murder in the Abbey utterly fails to be something I can recommend to anyone". The Adrenaline Vault acknowledges the game is "populated by a cast of quirky characters". The Escapist reasoned that "we barely ever get to feel like we're participating in the investigation, just witnessing it. That's a big failing". DieHardGameFan deemed the title a "poorly done video game rip off" of The Name of the Rose. LeftStickRight noted the game has "relatively dark material...while the art style is a little cartoony", resulting in something that is "as disturbing as Missing but not as absurd and irreverent as The Curse of Monkey Island". Gamewatcher concluded that "fans of pure adventure games should really enjoy this title".
