= PC Fútbol =

Video game series

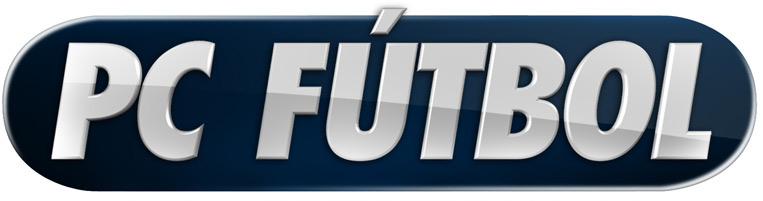
- Genre: Football management simulation
- Developers: Dinamic Software (1992); Dinamic Multimedia (1993–2001); Gaelco (2004–2006)
- Publishers: Dinamic Multimedia (1993–2001); Planeta DeAgostini (2004–2006)

PC Fútbol was a series of football management simulation games developed by Spanish developers Dinamic Multimedia. It was one of the big successes in the Spanish PC market, spawning several titles from 1992 until the studio's closure in 2001. The series was later revived in 2004 by developers Gaelco and there were two more releases before the series final demise.

== History ==
PC Fútbol was a significant hit in Spain; Marca's Marcos Anton wrote that it "became an absolute legend of the genre". Its first installment sold 7,000 copies in Spain, while PC Fútbol 7 reached domestic sales of 360,000 copies. The games were always sold at a budget price, usually in newspaper booths, and were always fiercely championed by the local press. Unlike most other football sims at the time, the game (since 2.0) allowed to take both player (dubbed arcade) and managerial approach to the game, a formula that was not used in mainstream games until Total Club Manager 2004 allowed FIFA Football 2004 owners to actually play the game (which in its turn was modeled after Ascaron's Anstoss series).

Former Liverpool player and Spanish television pundit, Michael Robinson was the face and voice of the game, and most of the season analysis inside the updates was signed by him. The game was one of the first licensed games - by the Liga de Fútbol Profesional - which meant that the developers were able to use real player and team names.

One of the most distinguishable features of the series were the updates; the game had a built-in calendar and league tracking utility and so owners of the game could connect to Dinamic's servers and update their data monthly. Some of the data (like photos) could not be fit inside a floppy, and data packs were made available in gaming magazines or via direct request. As the CD-ROM replaced the floppy versions (around 1996), there was no need for additional data packs, but there was still a final update (released in the end of the season) that would complete all league tracking data and Robinsons' comments.

The later games (2000 and 2001) were plagued by bugs, and although the updates assured a less problematic gaming experience, it had worn some of the userbase, who could finally have fully licensed alternatives from EA Sports and Sports Interactive (FIFA/Stars and Championship Manager, respectively). By mid-2001 PC Fútbol 2001 support ceased, and Dinamic closed shortly after. A complete modification ("mod") of the game was released shortly after, showing a still dedicated fan-base. A total of nine titles in the main series were released, the first simply numbered, and the final two 2000 and 2001, and sold around 1 million copies altogether.

In 2004, Planeta DeAgostini acquired the rights to the name and released PC Fútbol 2005, developed by Gaelco. It continued the "tradition" of bug-ridden games of the early games, and although it sold very well in December 2004 (second only to The Sims 2), most fans were disappointed with it.

Many years after the release of PC Fútbol 2007 (the last version made by Gaelco), Korner IDC Games launch PC Fútbol 2018, the first version developed for mobile devices and the last game of the series made until now, but the overall quality of the product was disappointing and the game was finally retired from the Google Play store.

In 2023 the return on PC was announced (PC Fútbol 8), but after many unsuccessful release attempts in 2024, the development was finally abandoned in 2025.

== Other titles ==
There were a number of titles released outside the main series: PC Calcio and PC Premier focused on the Italian and English football championships, and PC Clausura, aimed at Argentine market. Before the Euro'96, PC Selección'96, gave players the control of the Spanish team for the same tournament.

== PC Fútbol abroad ==
Since the first versions of the game were only available in Spanish, the series market was limited, but the success was wide. In 1994, Dinamic Multimedia decided to reach the Italian and Argentine markets and published PC Calcio and PC Fútbol Clausura. Both were successful and followed by other versions each year.

In 1996, Gremlin approached the Spanish company to develop new titles on their highly regarded Premier Manager series. Three games were released using the PC Fútbol engine, from 1997 to 1999. In 2000, EuroLeague Football, an English oriented version of PC Fútbol 2000, was published by Sold-Out Software.

== Games ==
- Simulador Profesional de Fútbol
- PC Fútbol 2.0
- PC Fútbol 3.0
- PC Fútbol 4.0
- PC Fútbol 5.0
- PC Fútbol 6.0
- PC Fútbol 7
- PC Fútbol 2000
- PC Fútbol 2001
- PC Fútbol 2005
- PC Fútbol 2006
- PC Fútbol 2007
- PC Fútbol 18
