= Dinamic Multimedia =

Spanish software publisher

Dinamic Multimedia, S.A.
- Type: Sociedad Anónima
- Industry: Video game
- Predecessor: Microdigital Soft
- Founded: 1993
- Founder: Pablo Ruiz Tejedor; Víctor Ruiz Tejedor; Nacho Ruiz Tejedor; Carlos Abril; José Ignacio Gómez-Centurión
- Defunct: 21 September 2001
- Headquarters: Pozuelo de Alarcón, Madrid, Spain
- Products: PC Fútbol series

Dinamic Multimedia was a Spanish software house and publisher created in 1993 which was created after the bankruptcy of Dinamic Software in 1992 by some of its former members. After having released several titles, they filed for bankruptcy in September 2001.

== History ==
The "jewel in the crown" of the company was the PC Fútbol series, which featured an annual installment for a decade. Originally only featuring the Spanish leagues, later versions were developed for Italy (PC Calcio) and Argentina (PC Fútbol Apertura and Clausura). For the broader English market, EuroLeague Football was released in 2000, following a brief licensing of the Premier Manager franchise in the late 1990s. Dinamic also released other sports games, such as PC Basket, PC Atletismo or Eurotour Cycling, as well as adventure games such as Hollywood Monsters, one of the biggest projects in Spanish game development history. Most of the house titles and Spanish-produced games were marketed as budget titles and were fiercely championed by the local gaming press. In their late years, Dinamic expanded to Italy (in 1997) and distributed several titles in Spain, including high-profile titles such as Flying Corps Gold, Blade Runner, Sega Rally Championship 2 and Shogo. One of the other games such as Toyland Racing has sold 35,000 copies in Spain.

In 1999, the Ruíz brothers and Carlos Abril left the company on disagreements with the main owner, and co-founded FX Interactive.

Dinamic fell into financial turmoil during the first half of 2001. The publisher's ventures related to the dot-com bubble—such as the massively multiplayer online role-playing game La Prisión—proved unsuccessful, and the company was caught in the global dot-com collapse. By early March, rumors had spread that Dinamic was in danger of closing. The company responded that only its online division was being shuttered, and traditional game projects such as Runaway: A Road Adventure were not in jeopardy, despite their delays. However, key faculty secretly departed Dinamic to join Pyro Studios during the period, and Dinamic entered receivership and cut 39 jobs in late March. Dinamic owed a significant debt of 1.5 billion pesetas to multiple creditors by this time. On 24 September, Dinamic announced its liquidation, following its financial upheaval earlier in the year. Although certain commentators had speculated that Runaway's sales would save the publisher, it was ultimately Dinamic's last published title.

Dinamic's bankruptcy came as a major blow to the domestic game market: at the time, a writer for VNUNet reported the closure as "bad news ... for the battered Spanish game software industry". In retrospect, David Navarro of MarcaPlayer called it "probably the most traumatic event that the Spanish video game industry has experienced in history".

== Games ==
Dinamic Multimedia published the following games:

- Arctic Moves
- EuroTour Cycling
- Hollywood Monsters
- M-Alien Paranoia
- La Prision
- Los justicieros
- PC Atletismo
- PC Selección Española de Fútbol: Eurocopa 96 Dinamic Multimedia
- Resurrection: The Return of the Black Dragon
- Runaway: A Road Adventure
- PC Basket series
- PC Fútbol series
- PC Calcio series
- PC Premiere series
- Space Clash. The Last Frontier (1999, from Enigma)
- Toyland Racing
